= List of Turkish films of 1976 =

A list of films produced in Turkey in 1976 (see 1976 in film):

Name	Director	Starring	Distributed by	Type	Notes
Adalı Kız					
Adana Urfa Bankası					
Afilli Delikanlı					
Ah Bu Gençlik					
Aile Şerefi					
Alev					
Ah Dede Vah Dede					
Ah Ne Güzel Nane Şekeri					
Alo Kolombo (Çığlık)					
Aman Karım Duymasın					
Analar Ölmez					
Arzu					
Arabacının Aşkı					
Aşk Dediğin Laf Değildir					
Aşk Dediğin Laftır					
Atmaca Ali					
Avanak					
Aybike Kurt Kız					
Babanın Suçu					
Baş Belası					
Ben Bir Garip Keloğlanım					
Ben Sana Mecburum					
Beş Dakikada Beşiktaş					
Bıktım Bu Hayattan					
Bitmeyen Şarkı					
Bitirim Hüsnü					
Bizim Düğün Ne Zaman					
Bodrum Hakimi					
Bu Nasıl Dünya					
Bulunmaz Uşak					
Bülbül Ailesi					
Canan Pazarı					
Cezanı Çekeceksin					
Cıbıl					
Çılgın Milyoner					
Çılgın Ama Tatlı					
Çifte Kavrulmuş					
Çizmeli Kedi					
Dağılın Kazımlar Geliyor					
Dalgacı Mahmut					
Dar Geçit					
Defineci					
Deli Gibi Sevdim					
Delicesine					
Deprem					
Devlerin Aşkı					
Doğru Yoldan Ayrılanlar					
Eden Bulur					
Eksik Etek					
Elmanın Alına Bak					
Evlatlık (Çıngar)					
Evlilik Şirketi					
Fiyakanı Bozarım					
Gel Barışalım					
Gizli Kuvvet					
Gurbetçiler Dönüyor					
Gülşah Küçükanne					
Günah					
Günahkar					
Güngörmüşler					
Hababam Sınıfı Uyanıyor	Ertem Eğilmez	Münir Özkul, Kemal Sunal, Halit Akçatepe			
Hammal					
Hamza Dalar Osman Çalar					
Hasip İle Nasip	Osman F. Seden	Zeki Alasya, Metin Akpınar			
Hora Geliyor Hora					
Hayırsız Evlat					
Her Gönülde Bir Aslan Yatar					
Hınç					
İki Kızgın Adam					
İki Arkadaş					
İntikamcı					
İşler Karıştı (Zühtü)					
Kadı Han					
Kadınlara Dayanamam					
Kader Bu					
Kader Rüzgarı					
Kader Bağlayınca					
Kader Utansın					
Kader Torbası					
Kafes					
Kanundan Kaçamazsın					
Kan Kardeşler					
Kana Kan					
Kapıcılar Kralı	Zeki Ökten	Kemal Sunal, Bilge Zobu			
Kaplan Pençesi					
Kartal Pendik Gittik Geldik					
Kara Murat Şeyh Gaffar'a Karşı					
Kayıkçının Küreği		Ali Poyrazoğlu			
Kaybolan Saadet					
Kolomba Şakir					
Korkunç Şüphe					
Korkusuz Cengaver					
Kötüler de Ağlar					
Kıvrıl Fakat Kırılma					
Krallar Eğleniyor					
Kime Niyet Kime Kısmet					
Kucaktan Kucağa					
Kuklalar					
Kanunun Kuvveti					
Kurban Olayım					
Leş Kargaları					
Lüküs Hayat					
Mağlup Edilmeyenler					
Mahallede Şenlik Var					
Meraklı Köfteci	Ergin Orbey				
Merhaba	Özcan Arca	Halil Ergün			
Mikrop					
Namus Belası					
Nazmiye'nin Koltukları					
Ne Haber					
Ne Alsan İki Buçuk					
Ne Umduk Ne Bulduk					
Nerde Beleş Orda Yerleş					
Nereye Bakıyor Bu Adamlar					
Nereye Arkadaş					
O Biçim Miras					
O Kadınlar					
Oldu Olacak					
Ölüme Yalnız Gidilir					
Örgüt					
Öyle Olsun					
Parola Kartal					
Perişan					
Profesyonel					
Portakal					
Saffet Beni Affet		Sadri Alışık			
Sahte Kabadayı	Natuk Baytan				
Seni Sevmekle Suçluyum					
Selam Dostum					
Sevdalılar					
Sevmek Ölesiye					
Sıralardaki Heyecan					
Sihirli Şamdan					
Silahlara Veda					
Sokak Kadını					
Söyleyin Anama Ağlamasın					
Su Perisi Elması					
Sürgün					
Süt Kardeşler	Ertem Eğilmez				
Sütü Bozuk					
Şahin					
Şeytan Diyorki					
Şoför					
Şoför Memet					
Şok					
Taksi Şoförü					
Tantana Kardeşler					
Taşra Kızı					
Tavşan Kızlar					
Tek Başına					
Tepedeki Ev					
Tilki Payı					
Tosun Paşa					
Tuzak					
Utanmaz Adam					
Yalan					
Yaman Delikanlı					
Yarınsız Adam					
Yarim İstanbul'u Mesken Mi Tuttun					
Yazgı					
Yirmidört Saat					
Yumurtanın Sarısı					
Zühtü					

== See also ==
- 1976 in Turkey
