= Trial film =

Legal drama film centered on a trial

Trial film is a subgenre of the legal/courtroom drama that encompasses films that are centered on a civil or criminal trial, typically a trial by jury.

The trial genre differs from the broader courtroom drama in that the latter includes any film in which a justice system plays an integral role in the film's narrative, and thus does not necessarily require the inclusion of a legal trial.

== Notable films ==
In 1989, the American Bar Association rated the 12 best trial films of all time in their ABA Journal, providing a detailed and reasoned legal evaluation for its choices. Ten of the films are in English; M (1931) is in German and The Passion of Joan of Arc (1928) is a French silent film. Moreover, ten of them take place (at least, in part) in a courtroom.

In 2008, the American Film Institute compiled its own "courtroom drama" top-ten list, five films of which were also on the ABA list.

The ABA also published a list of the 12 best trial stageplays, noting that the transition from film to the stage is sometimes difficult. It also has an extensive honorable mention list.

Title	Release year	Top ten list	Notes
12 Angry Men	1957	American Bar Association (ABA); American Film Institute (AFI)	Nominated for 3 Academy Awards.
A Cry in the Dark	1988	AFI	Nominated for an Academy Award, based on a real trial.
A Few Good Men	1992	AFI	Court-martial
A Man for All Seasons	1966	ABA and AFI	Nominated for 8 Academy Awards, winning 6. Based on a real trial.
In Cold Blood	1967	AFI	Nominated for 4 Academy Awards. Based on a real trial.
Anatomy of a Murder	1959	ABA and AFI	Nominated for 7 Academy Awards. Based on a real trial.
Inherit the Wind	1960	ABA and AFI	Nominated for 4 Academy Awards. Based on a real trial.
Judgment at Nuremberg	1961	ABA	Nominated for 11 Academy Awards, winning 2. Based on a real trial.
Kramer vs. Kramer	1979	AFI	Nominated for 9 Academy Awards, winning 5 of them.
M	1931	ABA	
Paths of Glory	1957	ABA	Based on a real court-martial.
The Passion of Joan of Arc	1928	ABA	Based on a real trial.
The Trial	1962	ABA	
The Wrong Man	1957	ABA	Based on a real trial.
To Kill a Mockingbird	1962	ABA and AFI	Nominated for 8 Academy Awards, winning 3.
The Verdict	1982	ABA and AFI	Nominated for 5 Academy Awards.
Witness for the Prosecution	1957	AFI	Nominated for 6 Academy Awards.

== Varieties ==
Aside from the first few minutes of the film, 12 Angry Men (1957) does not take place in a courtroom. It views the particular case and the system of justice through the prism of jury deliberations. The film explains practical explications of legal concepts basic to the American system of justice, and their effect on a particular trial and defendant. Those include the presumption of innocence, burden of proof, and the requirement of proof beyond a reasonable doubt.

The trial in M (1931) does not take place in a legal courtroom; rather, crime syndicate leaders along with the city's underground hold proceedings in a warehouse. Despite the lack of legal trappings, "it is one of the most effective trials ever filmed, questioning our notions of justice and revenge, mob rule and order, power and responsibility." Wearing long leather coats instead of robes, criminals become judges. The murderer is cast as the victim, while the forces of law and order must rely on luck. Peter Lorre strikingly raises the issue of his culpability due to alleged insanity, and the imposition of ultimate retributive justice is depicted as being unsatisfying for society and the survivors of the murdered victims.

Courtroom films are typically dramas, but there have been several comedy films centering around trials, including Adam's Rib, My Cousin Vinny, and Legally Blonde.

=== Military trial films ===
The military trial film is a subtype of the trial genre that focuses on military trials (i.e., court-martial).

They typically include conflicting questions of loyalty, command responsibility, ethical rules and rules of engagement, obedience to superior authority, politics and class conflict. War and trials are good foils for one another. The struggles are perennial and engaging. A partial list includes:

Title	Release year	Description
The Caine Mutiny	1954	Based on the 1951 Pulitzer Prize-winning novel The Caine Mutiny by Herman Wouk, the film depicted the strongly contested court-martial of the executive officer of the U.S. Navy destroyer minesweeper USS Caine Lieutenant Stephen Maryk (Van Johnson) for mutiny against Lieutenant Commander Philip Francis Queeg (Humphrey Bogart) in the Pacific War during World War II and a particularly dynamic cross-examination, in which Captain Queeg acts out one of film's most dramatic meltdowns.
Paths of Glory	1957	black and white depiction of a corrupt World War I French court martial leading to a firing squad, and a 'futility of war' conclusion. It was directed by Stanley Kubrick, starring Kirk Douglas as the failed defense attorney.
Town Without Pity	1961	Dimitri Tiomkin and Ned Washington were nominated for an Academy Award for the theme song, "Town Without Pity", which was sung by Gene Pitney.
King and Country	1964	In the trenches in France during World War I, a British captain (Dirk Bogarde) has to defend a shell-shocked private (Tom Courtenay), who is charged with desertion. The film was directed by Joseph Losey.
Breaker Morant	1980	A court martial of Australian soldiers, including Harry 'Breaker' Morant, by their British commanders in the aftermath of the Boer War in South Africa. The film details the tribulations of the defense counsel and the defendants, as they try to throw a wrench into the administrative gears of Morant's court martial. Anticipating the Nuremberg trials and the defense of "superior orders", the soldiers' main defense is that they were doing their duty as they understood it, and following orders and policy from above. Nevertheless, this "kangaroo court" moves to its inevitable conclusion. The film was nominated for an Academy Award.
A Few Good Men	1992	released after the ABA's list was compiled, the film contains the famous "You can't handle the truth" exchange. The film was adapted from a Broadway play written by Aaron Sorkin (who also wrote the screenplay), and acted by Tom Cruise, Demi Moore and Jack Nicholson.
Rules of Engagement	2000	Marine Colonel Terry Childers (Samuel L. Jackson) is brought to court-martial on charges of disobeying the rules of engagement in a military incident at an American embassy in Yemen, with flashbacks to Vietnam.
Shaurya	2008	a Hindi-language film based on the backdrop of the Kashmir conflict, and directed by Samar Khan starring Rahul Bose and Kay Kay Menon in lead roles.
Melvilasom	2011	a Malayalam-language film based on Soorya Krishna Moorthy's stage play of the same name, which itself was based on the play Court Martial by Swadesh Deepak.
American Traitor: The Trial of Axis Sally	2021	It is based on the life of Mildred Gillars, an American singer and actor who during World War II broadcast Nazi propaganda to US troops and their families back home.
The Caine Mutiny Court-Martial	2023	Another adaptation of the novel The Caine Mutiny, where Lieutenant Commander Queeg was portrayed by Kiefer Sutherland and Lieutenant Maryk was portrayed by Jake Lacy. The mutiny is set in the Persian Gulf in December 2022 instead of the Pacific War in World War II as set in the book and the 1954 film.

=== Religious trial films ===
- God on Trial (2008) is a BBC/WGBH Boston television play that takes place in Auschwitz during World War II. The Jewish prisoners put God on trial in absentia for abandoning the Jewish people by allowing Nazi Germany to commit genocide.
- The Passion of the Christ (2004), in which Jesus Christ (played by Jim Caviezel) is alternately tried by Herod Antipas and Pontius Pilate and ultimately executed by Pilate. Nominated for three Academy Awards.
- The Devil and Daniel Webster (1941) features Walter Huston as the Devil arguing for a man's soul. Huston was nominated for the Best Actor in a Leading Role Academy Award.
- Solomon and Sheba (1959) portrays the famous Judgment of Solomon from the Bible.
- The Man Who Sued God (2001), an Australian film starring Billy Connolly who takes God (represented by the church) to court for compensation over the destruction of his fishing boat due to an "act of God".
- Inherit the Wind (1960), starring Spencer Tracy, Fredric March, and Gene Kelly, is an American film set in a small religious town where a teacher begins to teach evolution, and goes to court for his right to teach such.
- The Trial of Joan of Arc, a 1962 French historical drama film
- The Exorcism of Emily Rose (2005), directed by Scott Derrickson, is an American courtroom drama horror film loosely based on the story of Anneliese Michel. It follows a self-proclaimed agnostic defense lawyer representing a parish priest who is accused by the state of negligent homicide after he performed an exorcism. The film, which largely takes place in a courtroom, depicts the events leading up to and including the exorcism through flashbacks.
- The Crucible (1996) is a drama film written by Arthur Miller and based on his play of the same name, loosely dramatising the Salem witch trials. It was directed by Nicholas Hytner and stars Daniel Day-Lewis as John Proctor, Winona Ryder as Abigail Williams, Paul Scofield as Judge Thomas Danforth, and Joan Allen as Elizabeth Proctor.

=== Historical trial films ===
Historical trial films are noted for frequently taking dramatic liberties with historical accounts for the purposes of simplifying the storyline, exaggerating dramatic effects, or pressing a point with the audience.

- An American Tragedy, a 1931 drama directed by Josef von Sternberg, based on the historic 1906 murder of Grace Brown by Chester Gillette at Big Moose Lake in upstate New York.
- The Prisoner of Shark Island, a 1936 biopic directed by John Ford, loosely based on the life of Maryland physician Samuel Mudd, who treated the injured presidential assassin John Wilkes Booth and later spent time in prison after his controversial conviction for being one of Booth's accomplices.
- They Won't Forget, a 1937 drama film directed by Mervyn LeRoy, providing a fictionalized account of the trial and subsequent lynching of Leo Frank after the murder of Mary Phagan in 1913.
- Young Mr. Lincoln, a 1939 biopic of Abraham Lincoln directed by John Ford.
- The Letter, a 1940 film directed by William Wyler, inspired by the Ethel Proudlock case, a real-life scandal involving the Eurasian wife of the headmaster of a school in Kuala Lumpur who was convicted in a murder trial after shooting dead a male friend.
- Boomerang, a 1947 American crime semidocumentary film based on the true story of a vagrant (Harold Israel in real life, John Waldron in the film) accused of murdering a clergyman.
- The Girl in the Red Velvet Swing, a 1955 American fictionalized account of model and actress Evelyn Nesbit, who became embroiled in the scandal surrounding the June 1906 murder of her paramour, architect Stanford White, by her husband, rail and coal tycoon Harry Kendall Thaw.
- The Accused (1988), a legal drama starring Jodie Foster, loosely based on the 1983 gang rape case of Cheryl Araujo.
- JFK (1991) is an American conspiracy-thriller film that examines the events leading to the assassination of John F. Kennedy, and it alleged cover-up, through the eyes of former New Orleans district attorney Jim Garrison. The film culminates in the 1969 trial of businessman Clay Shaw for his alleged participation in a conspiracy to assassinate the president.
- In the Name of the Father, a 1993 biographical crime drama film based on the true story of the Guildford Four, four people falsely convicted of the 1974 Guildford pub bombings that killed four off-duty British soldiers and a civilian.
- Murder in the First, a 1995 American legal drama that tells the alternate history of a petty criminal named Henri Young who is sent to Alcatraz Federal Penitentiary and later put on trial for murder in the first degree
- Amistad (1997) is a historical drama, directed by Steven Spielberg, based on the true story of an uprising in 1839 by newly-captured African slaves that took place aboard the ship La Amistad off the coast of Cuba, the subsequent voyage to the northeastern United States, and the legal battle that followed their capture by a U.S. revenue cutter. It was nominated for four Academy Awards.
- A Civil Action (1998) is a film based on the 1996 nonfiction novel of the same name. It stars John Travolta and Robert Duvall, the latter having been nominated for Best Supporting Actor for the film.
- Find Me Guilty, a 2006 comedy-drama based on the true story of the trial of Jackie DiNorscio, the longest Mafia trial in American history.
- Flash of Genius, a 2008 American biographical drama film focusing on Robert Kearns (played by Greg Kinnear) and his legal battle against the Ford Motor Company after they developed an intermittent windshield wiper based on Kearns' patented invention.
- Bernie (2011) is a black comedy film based on the real-life 1996 murder of 81-year-old millionaire Marjorie Nugent in Carthage, Texas by her companion Bernhardt "Bernie" Tiede. Tiede having been extremely well-liked in his local community, the film explores the trial process and the popular support he received, which caused great difficulties for the prosecution.
- Gosnell: The Trial of America's Biggest Serial Killer, a 2018 American drama film based on real life events about Kermit Gosnell, a physician and highly atypical abortion provider who was convicted of first degree murder in the deaths of three infants born alive.
- The Trial of the Chicago 7 (2020) is a legal drama focused on the trial of the so-called 'Chicago Seven' in the late 1960s to early 1970.

=== Comedies ===
- Judge Priest, a 1934 Will Rogers comedy directed by John Ford.
- Roxie Hart, 1942 comedy directed by William Wellman.
- In Miracle on 34th Street (1947) Kris Kringle (Edmund Gwenn) has his sanity examined at a hearing. The film won 4 Academy Awards, with Gwenn winning for Best Actor in a Supporting Role. The film was also nominated for Best Picture.
- Adam's Rib, a 1949 comedy directed by George Cukor.
- Divorce Italian Style, a 1961 comedy-drama film directed by Pietro Germi.
- Kibar Feyzo (1978) is a Turkish comedy drama film starring Kemal Sunal, Şener Şen, Müjde Ar, Adile Naşit, İhsan Yüce, İlyas Salman and Erdal Özyağcılar.
- From the Hip (1987) is a Comedy Drama starring Judd Nelson, Elizabeth Perkins, John Hurt, and Ray Walston about a first year lawyer manipulating his way into trying a case much earlier in his career than is normal. Much of the humor took place in the first case, a simple assault case in which he garnered significant media attention and developed a high profile for himself and attention to his firm. The more dramatic second case was a murder case which tested the young attorney's ethics.
- A Fish Called Wanda, a 1988 heist comedy film following a gang of diamond thieves who double-cross one another to recover stolen diamonds hidden by their jailed leader. In an effort to locate the diamonds, one of the thieves seduces the barrister defending the leader.
- My Cousin Vinny, a 1992 comedy film about an inexperienced personal injury lawyer who is hired to represent his cousin and the cousin's friend, who have been put on trial for a murder they did not commit.
- Liar Liar, a 1997 American satirical fantasy comedy film starring Jim Carrey as a lawyer who built his entire career on lying but finds himself cursed to speak only the truth for a single day.
- Legally Blonde, a 2001 American romantic comedy film about a sorority girl who attempts to win back her ex-boyfriend by following him to Harvard Law School, culminating in her defending a fellow sorority member on trial for murder.
- Chicago, a 2002 satirical musical comedy film adapted from the 1975 stage musical of the same name, centered on the fictional cause célèbre trial of a woman who killed her paramour.

== Other examples ==
- Fury, a 1936 drama directed by Fritz Lang.
- Mr. Deeds Goes to Town, a 1936 film by Frank Capra.
- The Return of Frank James, a 1940 western directed by Fritz Lang.
- The Devil and Daniel Webster, a 1941 fantasy film directed by William Dieterle.
- The Ox-Bow Incident, unusual in that the trial does not take place in a formal court room, but is a vote among a posse that turns into a lynch mob. Directed by William A. Wellman, and starring Henry Fonda (who also starred in Twelve Angry Men). It was nominated for Best Picture Oscar in 1943.
- Leave Her to Heaven, a 1945 film noir directed by John M. Stahl.
- The Lady from Shanghai, a 1947 film noir directed and starring Orson Welles.
- The Paradine Case, a 1947 film noir directed by Alfred Hitchcock.
- Pinky, a 1949 film directed by Elia Kazan.
- Knock on Any Door, a 1949 American courtroom trial film noir directed by Nicholas Ray and starring Humphrey Bogart.
- Rashomon, a 1950 film directed by Akira Kurosawa.
- A Place in the Sun, a 1951 drama film directed by George Stevens.
- The Sun Shines Bright, 1953 remake directed by John Ford.
- The Phenix City Story, a 1955 film noir crime film directed by Phil Karlson.
- Trial, a 1955 American drama film about a Mexican boy accused of rape and murder; originally victimized by prejudiced accusers, he becomes a pawn of his communist defender, whose propaganda purposes would be best served by a verdict of guilty.
- The Tattered Dress, a 1957 film noir crime film centering on two trials, the first of a wealthy man charged with a murder, and the second of the wealthy man's defense attorney, who is framed for bribing a juror in the first case.
- Gunman's Walk, a 1958 western directed by Phil Karlson.
- I Confess, a 1953 American film noir directed by Alfred Hitchcock.
- The Wreck of the Mary Deare is told in flashbacks as witnesses give their account of a story during an Admiralty court proceeding.
- Compulsion, a 1959 film directed by Richard Fleischer.
- Sergeant Rutledge, a 1960 western directed by John Ford.
- It Started in Naples, a 1960 film directed by Melville Shavelson.
- La Vérité, a 1960 film directed by Henri-Georges Clouzot.
- The Boys, a 1962 British courtroom drama film revolving around four teenagers trial for the murder of a garage night watchman in the course of a burglary
- The Man Who Shot Liberty Valance, a 1962 western directed by John Ford.
- The Last Wave (released in the United States as Black Rain), a 1977 Australian mystery drama film directed by Peter Weir, about a white solicitor in Sydney whose seemingly normal life is disrupted after he takes on a murder case and discovers that he shares a strange, mystical connection with the small group of local Aboriginal people accused of the crime.
- ...And Justice for All (1979), directed by Norman Jewison and nominated for 2 Academy Awards, examines the flawed and human, venal, and immoral side of justice, focusing on all-too-human judges. As Norman Webster wrote, the film "is a sweeping – and somewhat simple-minded – indictment of the American justice system." The film can be seen from the perspective of Judicial Qualifications Commissions (also known as Judicial Tenure Commissions), which are judicial agencies charged with overseeing judicial performance and conduct. From that end, the indictment of the courts and judicial system (and the examples) are not so outlandish as might be supposed. Starred Al Pacino, Jack Warden, and John Forsythe.
- A Passage to India, a 1984 film set in colonial India: a doctor is wrongly accused of a sexual assault by an English newcomer
- Suspect, a 1987 American legal mystery thriller film starring Cher as Kathleen Riley, a beleaguered D.C. public defender assigned to represent homeless veteran Carl Wayne Anderson (Liam Neeson) accused of a murder because he was seen sleeping in the victim's car the night of her murder.
- Music Box, a 1989 film about a Hungarian-American immigrant accused of having been a war criminal, and defended by his daughter, an attorney.
- Presumed Innocent (1990) is a film directed by Alan J. Pakula, adapted from the novel of the same name by Scott Turow, in which an assistant district attorney (Harrison Ford) is on trial, framed for the murder of another assistant DA (Greta Scacchi). The film received several nominations for its screenplay, written by Alan J. Pakula and Frank Pierson.
- Q & A, a 1990 American crime film written and directed by Sidney Lumet, based on a novel by New York State Supreme Court judge Edwin Torres.
- The Trial, a 1993 British film directed by David Hugh Jones and starring Kyle MacLachlan and Anthony Hopkins.
- Sommersby, a 1993 American period romantic drama directed by Jon Amiel set in the Reconstruction era following the American Civil War.
- The Client a 1994 American legal thriller film directed by Joel Schumacher, and starring Susan Sarandon, Tommy Lee Jones and Brad Renfro in his film debut. It is based on the novel of the same name by John Grisham. The film was released in the United States on July 20, 1994. The movie features an all star cast. Sarandon nominated for an Academy Award for Best Actress and won a BAFTA Award for Best Actress in a Leading Role.
- Primal Fear (1996) is a film, directed by Gregory Hoblit, that tells a story of a defense attorney (Richard Gere) who defends an altar boy (Edward Norton) charged with the murder of a Catholic archbishop. The film is an adaptation of William Diehl's novel of the same name. Norton was nominated for an Academy Award for Best Supporting Actor for his career-launching role.
- A Time to Kill (1996) is a feature film adaptation of John Grisham's 1989 legal drama of the same name.
- The Juror, a 1996 American legal thriller film starring Demi Moore as a single mother picked for jury duty for a mafia trial, and Alec Baldwin as a mobster sent to intimidate her.
- The Rainmaker (1997) is a feature film adaptation of John Grisham's 1995 legal thriller of the same name. It stars Matt Damon, Claire Danes, Jon Voight, Mary Kay Place, Mickey Rourke, Danny DeVito, Danny Glover, Roy Scheider, Virginia Madsen, and Teresa Wright in her final film role.
- Runaway Jury, a 2003 American film adaptation of the John Grisham novel The Runaway Jury, the film pits lawyer Wendell Rohr (Dustin Hoffman) against shady jury consultant Rankin Fitch (Gene Hackman), who uses unlawful means to stack the jury with people sympathetic to the defense.
- Fracture, a 2007 psychological legal crime thriller film.
- The Trial, a 2010 drama film based on the novel of the same name by Robert Whitlow, centered on a murder trial.
- The Lincoln Lawyer, a 2011 American legal thriller film starring Matthew McConaughey as an attorney who typically defends low-end criminals
- The Judge, a 2014 American legal drama film starring Robert Downey Jr. as a hotshot lawyer defending his father, an aging judge played by Robert Duvall, against a vehicular manslaughter charge.
- The Trial (2014) is a Filipino legal drama film that tells the story of a mentally handicapped man who is accused of rape by the family of a teacher on whom he has a crush. It stars John Lloyd Cruz, Jessy Mendiola, Gretchen Barretto, Richard Gomez and Enrique Gil, and was produced by Star Cinema as part of their 20th anniversary offering.
- New Trial (2017) a South Korean drama film written and directed by Kim Tae-yoon, starring Jung Wo
- Joker: Folie à Deux, a 2024 American jukebox musical psychological thriller film directed by Todd Phillips and starring Joaquin Phoenix and Lady Gaga, loosely based on DC Comics characters. It is the sequel to the 2019 film, Joker, and centers on the criminal trial for the events of the former film.
- Other films named The Trial

== See also ==
- Legal drama
- The Andersonville Trial
- Films and television programmes based on Alice in Wonderland - Due to the courtroom scenes in various adaptations (taken from the last two chapters of the first book).
