= Kartal Tibet =

Turkish actor, director and screenwriter (1938–2021)

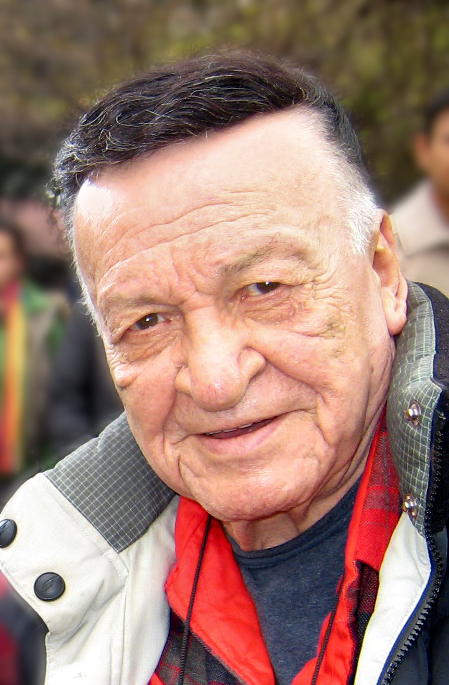
- Born: 27 March 1937; Ankara, Turkey
- Died: 1 July 2021 (aged 82); Istanbul, Turkey
- Occupations: Actor, film director
- Spouse: Gündüz Tibet (m. 1963)
- Children: 2
- Relatives: Civan Canova (stepson)

Kartal Tibet (27 March 1939 – 1 July 2021) was a Turkish actor, academic, director, screenwriter and producer.

A prominent lead actor of classic films in the Turkish cinema, he played a wide range of characters in various genres, including drama, comedy in around 120 films and 30 theatre plays. He started acting and dubbing at the age of eleven. Between 1955 and 1960, he studied at theatre department and its advanced theatre studies program at Ankara State Conservatory. He appeared in many films based on novels like Senede Bir Gün, Dokuzuncu Hariciye Koğuşu, Ölmeyen Aşk, Çalıkuşu, Hıçkırık. Also, he has film series Tarkan, Karaoğlan based on historical comic books, comedy film series Bitirim Kardeşler, child film series Yumurcak.

He then worked as an actor alongside female stars such as Hülya Koçyiğit, Fatma Girik, Türkan Şoray, Filiz Akın. He was assistant director of Ertem Eğilmez’s classic comedy films Hababam Sınıfı, Süt Kardeşler, Şaban Oğlu Şaban. He continues as director in other films of Hababam Sınıfı. His directorial debut was the classic comedy film Tosun Paşa. Kemal Sunal and Şener Şen movies were written and directed by Kartal Tibet and were produced by actress Hülya Koçyiğit. Kartal Tibet directed in many classic films and hit tv series.

He worked as an actor and director in Ankara State Theatre and State Theatres in other cities, Meydan Sahne, Dormen Theatre, Radio Child Theatre. In 1961, He founded first private theatre “Meydan Sahne” in Ankara. He performed plays like Caligula, A Midsummer Night's Dream, La Bonne Soupe, The Poker Session.

He studied law and later sports education in college but did not pursue a career in either field. Tibet was a great basketball player. Although Yalçın Granit wanted him to join national youth basketball team, he left his basketball career. In 1963, Kartal Tibet and Gündüz Kartal married. They have a son named Kanat and a daughter named Kumru. He is the stepfather of actor Civan Canova who is the son of theater teacher Mahir Canova and Gündüz Kartal. In 1980s, Kartal Tibet's one kidney was removed. On 1 July 2021, he died in Istanbul, aged 82. He was buried at the Zincirlikuyu Cemetery on 3 July 2021.

== Filmography ==
Movies
Year	Title	Role
1975	Curcuna	Bülent
1974	Ölüm Tarlası	
1974	Gaddar	Doktor Kemal
1974	Erkekler Ağlamaz	Yangın Mehmet
1974	Erkeksen Kaçma	Ahmet
1974	Sığıntı	Kemal Demir
1973	Düşman	Murat
1973	Şeytanın Kurbanları	
1973	Kabadayının Sonu	
1973	Kaderim Kanla Yazıldı	
1973	Siyah Eldivenli Adam	Şeker Ahmet
1973	Tarkan: Güçlü Kahraman	Tarkan
1973	Bitirim Kardeşler	Veli
1973	Aşk Mahkumu	Orhan
1973	Bataklık Bülbülü	Yusuf
1973	Zambaklar Açarken	Oğuz Albatros
1973	Bir Demet Menekşe	Kenan Manizade
1973	Bitirimler Sosyetede	Veli
1972	Zorbanın Aşkı	Ömer
1972	Sabu Kahraman Korsan	
1972	Ölüm Dönemeci	
1972	Vukuat Var	Muzaffer
1972	Aşk Fırtınası	Refik
1972	Yalan Dünya	
1972	Bir Pınar Ki	
1972	Takip	
1972	İtham Ediyorum	Aydın Hakman
1972	Kırık Hayat	Orhan
1972	Karaoğlan Geliyor	Karaoğlan
1972	Tarkan: Altın Madalyon	Tarkan
1972	Zulüm	Tarık
1971	Son Hıçkırık	İlhami/Ferit
1971	Aşk Uğruna	Civan Efe
1971	Görünce Kurşunlayın	
1971	Ölmeden Tövbe Et	
1971	Tanrı Şahidimdir	
1971	Sevenler Kavuşurmuş	Kenan
1971	Beklenen Şarkı	Selim
1971	Ömrümce Unutamadım - Ömrümce Aradım	Doğan
1971	Gelin Çiçeği	
1971	Tarkan: Viking Kanı	
1971	Mahşere Kadar	Murat
1971	Senede Bir Gün	Emin
1971	Ateş Parçası	Tarık Arman
1970	Beyaz Güller	Murat
1970	Son Nefes	Selim
1970	Arkadaşlık Öldü mü?	
1970	Aşk ve Tabanca	
1970	İşportacı Kız	Kartal
1970	Kaçak	Doğan
1970	Kadın Satılmaz	
1970	Kıskanırım Seni	
1970	Sevenler Ölmez	Kemal
1970	Fadime	Erol
1970	Küçük Hanımefendi	Ömer
1970	Güller ve Dikenler	Eşper
1970	Tarkan: Gümüş Eyer	Tarkan
1970	Seven Ne Yapmaz	Fikret
1969	Dağlar Kızı Reyhan	Kemal
1969	Kötü Kader	
1969	Namluda Beş Kurşun	
1969	Namus Fedaisi	
1969	Çakırcalı Mehmet Efe	Çakırcalı Mehmet Efe
1969	Dağlar Şahini	Şahin
1969	Kızım ve Ben	Murat
1969	Seninle Düştüm Dile	Kenan
1969	Boş Çerçeve	Ferit
1969	Cilveli Kız	Aydın
1969	Yumurcak	Nihat
1969	Tarkan	Tarkan
1969	Deli Murat	Deli Murat
1968	Bağdat Hırsızı	Yusuf
1968	Mafia Ölüm Saçıyor	
1968	İngiliz Kemal	İngiliz Kemal
1968	Sevemez Kimse Seni	Ferit
1968	Sarmaşık Gülleri	Necip
1968	Benim de Kalbim Var	Murat
1968	Funda	Vedat
1968	Son Hatıra	Ferit
1968	Hırsız Kız	Ömer
1968	Tahran Macerası	Ali
1968	Kanun Namına	Murat
1968	Aşka Tövbe	Mübin
1968	İstanbul Tatili	
1968	Nilgün	
1968	Sabahsız Geceler	
1967	Elveda	
1967	Kanunsuz Toprak	
1967	Kara Davut	
1967	Karaoğlan Yeşil Ejder	Karaoğlan
1967	Dokuzuncu Hariciye Koğuşu	
1967	Hırsız Prenses	
1967	Ömre Bedel Kız	Vedat
1967	Amansız Takip	
1967	Sefiller	Kemal/Sedat
1967	Paşa Kızı	Selim
1967	Ölünceye Kadar	Kartal
1967	Kader Bağı	Korkusuz Bill
1967	Osmanlı Kabadayısı	Deli Murat
1967	Parmaklıklar Arkasında	Ali Erhan
1967	Son Gece	Yüzbaşı Faruk
1967	Karaoğlan Bizanslı Zorba	Karaoğlan
1966	Bir Millet Uyanıyor	
1966	Ölmeyen aşk	
1966	Damgalı Kadın	
1966	Siyah Gül	
1966	Arzunun Bedeli	
1966	Karaoğlan Camoka'nın İntikamı Karaoğlan Camoka's Revenge	Karaoğlan
1966	İnsan Bir Kere Ölür	
1966	Ölüm Temizler	
1966	Ben Bir Sokak Kadınıyım	Ferdi
1966	Fatih'in Fedaisi	Murat
1966	Beyoğlu'nda Vuruşanlar	
1966	Yiğit Kanı	
1966	Kanunsuz Yol	
1966	Karaoğlan Baybora'nın Oğlu	Karaoğlan
1966	Çalıkuşu	Kamuran
1966	Senede Bir Gün	
1965	Karaoğlan Altay'dan Gelen Yiğit	Karaoğlan
1965	Hıçkırık	

=== as Cameo actor ===
- Şabaniye (1984) as Kartal Tibet
- Gurbetçi Şaban (1985) as waiting man for milk
- Deli Deli Küpeli (1986) as man who welcoming to manager
- Japon İşi (1987) as cassette seller
- Öğretmen (1988) as student's father
- Uyanık Gazeteci (1988) as drunk
- Samanyolu (1989) as Nejat's father
- Koltuk Belası (1990) as man in cafe

=== As director ===
1970s

- Tosun Paşa (1976)
- Cennetin Çocukları (1977)
- Sultan (1978)
- Hababam Sınıfı Dokuz Doğuruyor (1978) (a.k.a. Crazy Class Hard Times)
- Şark Bülbülü (1979)

1980s

- Zübük (1980)
- Sevgi Dünyası (1980)
- Gol Kralı (1980)
- Mutlu Ol Yeter (1981)
- Gırgıriyede Şenlik Var (1981)
- Gırgıriye (1981)
- Davaro (1981)
- İffet (1982)
- Gözüm Gibi Sevdim (1982)
- Doktor Civanım (1982)
- Baş Belası (1982)
- Şalvar Davası (1983)
- En Büyük Şaban (1983)
- Çarıklı Milyoner (1983)
- Aile Kadını (1983)
- Şabaniye (1984)
- Bir sevgi istiyorum (1984)
- Sosyete Şaban (1985)
- Şendul Şaban (1985)
- Şaban Pabucu Yarım (1985)
- Keriz (1985)
- Gurbetçi Şaban (1985)
- Deli Deli Küpeli (1986)
- Japon İşi (1987)
- Aile Pansiyonu (1987)
- Sevimli Hırsız (1988)
- İnatçı (1988)
- Talih Kuşu (1989)
- Gülen Adam (1989)

1990s

- Koltuk Belası (1990)
- Kızlar Yurdu (1992) (mini TV series)
- Süper Baba (1993) TV series (1993–1994) (a.k.a. Superdad (USA))
- Bizim Aile (1995) (mini TV series)
- Ah Bir Zengin Olsam (1998) (mini TV series)

2000s (decade)

- Sih Senem (2003) (mini) TV series
- Ağa Kızı (2004) (mini) TV series
- Hababam Sınıfı Merhaba (2004) (a.k.a. The Class of Chaos)
- AB'nin Yolları Taştan (2005) (mini) TV series
- Emret Komutanim (2005) TV series
- Dünyayı Kurtaran Adam'ın Oğlu (2006) (a.k.a. Turks in Space)
- Amerikalılar Karadeniz'de 2 (2007) (a.k.a. American at the Black Sea)
- Zoraki Koca (2007) TV series

=== As writer ===
- Çarıklı Milyoner (1983)
- Şabaniye (1984)
- Sosyete Şaban (1985)
- Şendul Şaban (1985)
- Deli Deli Küpeli (1986)
- Aile Pansiyonu (1987)

=== As editor ===
- Dünyayı Kurtaran Adam'ın Oğlu (2006) (a.k.a. Turks in Space)

=== As producer ===
- Şabaniye (1984)
