= Hababam Sınıfı Tatilde =

- Theatrical Poster
- Directed by: Ertem Eğilmez
- Written by: Sadık Şendil; Rıfat Ilgaz (novel)
- Produced by: Ertem Eğilmez
- Starring: Kemal Sunal; Şener Şen; Adile Naşit; Münir Özkul
- Cinematography: Erdoğan Engin
- Edited by: İsmail Kalkan
- Music by: Melih Kibar
- Production company: Arzu Film
- Release date: January 1, 1977
- Running time: 90 mins.
- Country: Turkey
- Language: Turkish

Hababam Sınıfı Tatilde is a 1977 Turkish comedy film, directed by Ertem Eğilmez based on a novel by Rıfat Ilgaz, starring Kemal Sunal as a highschool student in a private school which is joined by a new young teacher. The film, which went on nationwide general release on January 1, 1977, was the third sequel to hit comedy Hababam Sınıfı (1975).

== Cast ==
- Kemal Sunal as İnek Şaban
- Münir Özkul as Mahmut Hoca
- Tarık Akan as Damat Ferit
- Adile Naşit as Hafize Ana
- Halit Akçatepe as Güdük Necmi
- Ahmet Arıman as Hayta İsmail
- Cem Gürdap as Tulum Hayri
- Feridun Şavlı as Domdom Ali
- Sitki Akçatepe as Paşa Nuri (Physics teacher)
- Ertuğrul Bilda as Külyutmaz Hoca (Biology teacher)
- Kemal Ergüvenç as Kemal Hoca
- Akil Öztuna as Lütfü Hoca (Philosophy teacher)
- Muharrem Gürses as the headmaster
