= Erdal Özyağcılar =

Turkish actor

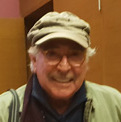
- Born: 4 August 1948 (age 77); İznik, Bursa, Turkey
- Occupation: Actor
- Spouse: Güzin Özyağcılar (m. 1972)
- Children: 2

Erdal Özyağcılar (born 4 August 1948) is a Turkish actor. He has appeared in films, on the stage and on television.

== Biography ==
Özyağcılar was born in 1948 in Bursa. He started his acting career in 1967, with the movie "Ölüm Tarlası" (Field of Death). He is a theater artist as well as a screen actor, who had roles in many plays, movies and TV series. He also appeared in TV commercials. He was cast in Kemal Sunal, Şener Şen's cult films.

Between 1989-1997, He played in the one of longest Turkish series "Bizimkiler".

Özyağcılar is a popular character in the TV series Yabancı Damat, which is famous both in Turkey and Greece. It is first Turkish series exported to Greece.

The artist regained his popularity in Turkey in 2007 with the series named Elveda Rumeli (Farewell Rumelia), portraying a Turkish peasant living during the turmoil times of 19th century in Balkans region, near Monastir, with his family, when Ottoman Empire started to lose territory and fall back.

He is married to Güzin Özyağcılar, also a theater actress.

== Filmography ==
Year	Title	Type	Actor	Character	Voice actor	Actor voiced over	Director	Writers	Producer	Note(s)
1966	Ah Güzel İstanbul	Film		Cengiz			Atıf Yılmaz			
1966	Ölüm Tarlası	Film		Aziz			Atıf Yılmaz			
1967	Balatlı Arif	Film					Atıf Yılmaz			
1967	Asayiş Berkemal	Film								
1976	The Message (Çağrı)									
1977	Çöpçüler Kralı	Film		Hacer's brother			Zeki Ökten	Umur Bugay	Ertem Eğilmez	
1977	Seyahatname	Film		Anlatıcı						
1978	Kibar Feyzo	Film		Zülfo			Atıf Yılmaz	İhsan Yüce	Ertem Eğilmez, Nahit Ataman	
1978	Sultan	Film		Çarli Cevat						
1979	Hayatım Roman	TV series								
1980	Bereketli Topraklar Üzerinde									
1980	Talihli Amele	Film		bricklayer						
1981	Ah Güzel İstanbul									
1981	Bir Damla Ateş									
1981	Deli Kan									
1981	Kırık Bir Aşk Hikayesi									
1981	Üç Kağıtçı						Natuk Baytan	Natuk Baytan	Yahya Kılıç	
1982	Çirkinler De Sever									
1982	Doktor Civanım									
1982	Faize Hücum									
1982	Göl									
1982	Yol									
1983	Çoban Yıldızı									
1983	Derman									
1983	Dönme Dolap									
1983	İdamlık									
1983	Kılıbık									
1983	Şaşkın Ördek									
1983	Tokatçı									
1983	Yorgun									
1983	Seni Seviyorum	Film								
1984	Beş Kafadar									
1984	Dil Yarası									
1984	Firar									
1984	Gülümseyen Dünya									
1984	Güneş Doğarken									
1984	Kanun Kanundur									
1984	Karanfilli Naciye									
1984	Kartal Bey									
1984	Kaşık Düşmanı									
1984	Pehlivan									
1984	Ölmez Ağacı									
1984	Ortadirek Şaban									
1984	Taçsız Kraliçe									
1984	Üşütük									
1984	Namuslu	Film		Mustafa						
1984	Postacı	Film		Latif						
1984	Şabaniye	Film		Şehmuz						
1985	Akrep Burcu									
1985	Bir Avuç Cennet									
1985	Çıplak Vatandaş									
1985	Drole De Samedi (Cumartesi Cumartesi)									
1985	Eroin Hattı									
1985	Kan									
1985	Sensizliğe Alışacağım									
1985	Sosyete Şaban									
1985	Yılanların Öcü	Film		Hac'eli/Hacı Ali						
1985	Züğürt Ağa	Film		Kekeç Salman						
1985	Aşık Oldum	Film		Macit						
1986	Ayrılamam									
1986	Bekçi									
1986	Deli Deli Küpeli									
1986	Duvardaki Kan									
1986	Kumarbaz									
1986	Tarzan Rıfkı									
1986	Yoksul									
1986	Perihan Abla	TV series								
1986	Beyoğlu'nun Arka Sokakları	Film								
1986	Hastahane	Film								
1986	Ya Ya Ya Şa Şa Şa	Film		Şevket						
1986	Kocamın Nişanlısı	Film		Uyuz Ömer						
1987	Alnımdaki Bıçak Yarası									
1987	Ateş Böceği									
1987	Benim Olsaydın									
1987	Bez Bebek									
1987	Günah Gecesi									
1987	Muhsin Bey									
1987	Su Da Yanar									
1987	Adem İle Havva	Film								
1987	On Kadın	Film		Mahmut						
1987	Sen de Yüreğinde Sevgiye Yer Aç	Film		Remzi						
1987	Çantada Keklik	Film								
1987	Alışırım									
1987	Bir Kırık Bebek			Remzi						
1987	Sis			Muhtar						
1988	Kadının Adı Yok									
1988	Yarın Cumartesi	Film		Tarık						
1988	Gömlek	Film		Şemsettin Ağa						
1989	Bakımsız Tarzan									
1989	Bizimkiler	TV series		Şükrü						
1990	Koltuk Belası									
1994	Şehnaz Tango	TV series		Tango Muhsin						
1997	Delikanlı	TV series								
1997	Sevda Kondu	TV series		Yakut						
2000	Karakolda Ayna Var	TV series		Eşref						
2002	Ah Yaşamak Var Ya	TV series								
2002	Mihriban	TV series		Necmi						
2002	Beşik Kertmesi	TV series		Aydede / Ayhan dede						
2002	Abdülhamit Düşerken	Film		İsmail Kemal						
2003	Esir Şehrin İnsanları	TV series								
2004	Altın Kafes	TV series								
2004	Yabancı Damat	TV series		Kahraman Baklavacıoğlu						
2007	Elveda Rumeli	TV series		Sütçü Ramiz						
2010	Karadağlar	TV series		Halit Karadağ						
2012	2 Yaka Bir İsmail	TV series		İsmail						
2013	Sevdaluk	TV series		Ali İhsan						
2016	Gülümse Yeter	TV series		Hasan Efendi						
2017	No 309	TV series		Yıldırım Yenilmez						
2017	Aile Arasında	Film		Haşmet Kurt						
2019	Şampiyon	TV series		Yaman Günaltay						
2019	Mucize 2: Aşk	Film		Bahattin						
2020	Yasak Elma	TV series		Hasan Ali Kuyucu						
2022	Balkan Ninnisi	TV series		Süleyman						
2022	Müstakbel Damat	Film		Çetin Ali						
2022	Sivaslıyıh Gardaş	Film								
2022	Aynasız Haluk	Film		Amir						
2023	Benim Güzel Ailem	TV series		Rasim						
2023	Şahsiyet	TV series		Kader						
2023	Prestij Meselesi	Film		Serpil Akıllıoğlu						
2023	Güven Bana	Film								
2024	Gaddar (TV series)	TV series		Ekber Baltacı						
2025	Gönül Dağı	TV series		Süleyman						
