= The Blue Bead =

1974 Turkish comedy film

- Film poster
- Directed by: Ertem Eğilmez
- Written by: Zeki Alasya; Ertem Eğilmez; Sadık Şendil
- Produced by: Ertem Eğilmez
- Starring: Emel Sayın; Tarık Akan; Zeki Alasya; Metin Akpınar; Münir Özkul; Halit Akçatepe; Kemal Sunal; Adile Naşit
- Cinematography: Hüseyin Özşahin
- Edited by: Arzu Film
- Release date: January 1, 1975
- Running time: 78 minutes
- Country: Turkey
- Language: Turkish

The Blue Bead (Turkish: Mavi Boncuk) is a 1974 Turkish comedy film, produced, co-written and directed by Ertem Eğilmez, featuring Turkish classical music singer Emel Sayın as a nightclub singer who is kidnapped by a gang of slackers after they are beaten and thrown out of the club where she works. The film, which went on nationwide general release across Turkey on January 1, 1975, is considered a comedy classic in its homeland.

== Cast ==
- Emel Sayın - Emel Sayın
- Tarık Akan - Yakışıklı (Handsome) Necmi
- Zeki Alasya - Şeker (Sweet) Kamil
- Metin Akpınar - Süleyman (Kanuni)
- Halit Akçatepe - Mıstık
- Münir Özkul - Baba (Father) Yaşar
- Kemal Sunal - Kaymakam (Governor) Cafer
- Adile Naşit - Adile
