= Şark Bülbülü =

- Directed by: Kartal Tibet
- Starring: Kemal Sunal; Ayşen Cansev
- Release date: 1979
- Running time: 76 minutes
- Country: Turkey
- Language: Turkish

Şark Bülbülü is a 1979 Turkish comedy/drama film directed by Kartal Tibet.

== Cast ==
- Kemal Sunal - Saban Ballises
- Ayşen Cansev - Hatice
- Ayşen Gruda - Fethi'nin Kiz Kardesi
- Osman Alyanak - Haydar
- Sırrı Elitaş - Zülfo Aga
- Dinçer Çekmez - Fethi
