= Sıtkı Akçatepe =

Turkish actor

- Born: 1902; Istanbul, Ottoman Empire
- Died: 1986 (aged 83–84); Istanbul, Turkey
- Occupation: Actor
- Years active: 1918–1986
- Spouse: Leman Akçatepe
- Children: Halit Akçatepe

Sıtkı Akçatepe (1902–1986) was a famous Turkish actor. He is a descendant of Nevşehirli Damat Ibrahim Pasha and Fatma Sultan (daughter of Ahmed III). He played together with his son, actor Halit Akçatepe and his wife actress "Leman Akçatepe" for some films.

His cinema career started as minor role in first Turkish sound film Bir Millet Uyanıyor alongside Atıf Kaptan. He was known for starring in the acclaimed classic series of comedy films Hababam Sınıfı and classic films "Tosun Paşa", Şaban Oğlu Şaban, Bizim Aile.

== Filmography ==
Year	Title	Role	Notes
1931	Bir Millet Uyanıyor	soldier that killed Yahya	Minor role
1939	Taş Parçası		
1953	Köprüaltı Çocukları		
1953	Mahallenin namusu	Kılavuz	
1955	Öp babanın elini		
1957	Mahşere kadar	Judge	
1958	Daha çekecek miyim		
1959	Karımın Aşkı		
1960	Can Mustafa		
1963	Çadır gülü	Karadayı ( Fatma's father)	
1973	Canım Kardeşim	Musta	
1975	Hababam Sınıfı	Pasa Nuri	
1975	Bizim Aile	Avukat	
1975	Pisi pisi	Fazil	Uncredited
1976	Hababam Sınıfı Sınıfta Kaldı	Pasa Nuri	
1976	Hababam Sınıfı Uyanıyor		
1976	Tosun Paşa	Seferoğlu Sıtkı	
1977	Hababam Sınıfı Tatilde	Pasa Nuri	
1977	Şabanoğlu Şaban	Sitki Pasa	
1978	Hababam Sınıfı Dokuz Doğuruyor	Pasa Nuri	
1981	Hababam Sınıfı Güle Güle		
1983	En Büyük Yumruk		
