= The King of the Street Cleaners =

- Directed by: Zeki Ökten
- Written by: Umur Bugay
- Screenplay by: Umur Bugay
- Produced by: Nahit Ataman
- Starring: Kemal Sunal; Şener Şen; Ayşen Gruda
- Cinematography: Erdoğan Engin
- Music by: Cahit Berkay; Özdemir Erdoğan
- Production company: Yeni Stüdyo
- Distributed by: Arzu Film
- Release date: 1 February 1978 (Istanbul)
- Running time: 90 minutes
- Country: Turkey
- Language: Turkish

The King of the Street Cleaners (Turkish: Çöpçüler Kralı), is a 1978 comedy drama film directed by Zeki Ökten and starring famous Turkish comedy actor Kemal Sunal. The film was written by Umur Bugay.

Cahit Berkay and Özdemir Erdoğan composed the film music. The film won awards at the 15th Antalya Film Festival (Umur Bugay "Best Screenplay") and Şener Şen ("Best Supporting Actor").

== Plot ==
Apti, a slow-witted but likeable street cleaner, lives and works in a neighborhood of İstanbul. His superior Şakir, a corrupt, and abrasive Zabıta (Municipal Inspector) officer, purposely makes Apti's life miserable by berating him for minor offenses and making him run errands for Şakir's annoying mother. Apti is in love with Hacer, a feisty house cleaner, but his attempts to court her usually fails due to Hacer having an affair with Şakir.

Şakir's overbearing mother refuses to allow her son to marry a "lowly cleaner". Şakir nevertheless wants to marry Hacer and after Şakir confronts her, Hacer's brothers beat him up.

Had enough of Şakir's indecision, Hacer's father decides to marry her to Apti. Apti visits Hacer's house and despite the very low impression he left on them, Hacer's father allows them to marry. After Şakir hears the news, he attacks Apti then forces him to catch all the cats in the neighborhood for revenge. He also has Hacer's brothers arrested.

Angered, Hacer attacks Şakir but the two make up during the fight after Şakir assures her that he will convince his mother. Şakir once again tries to talk his mother into allowing him to marry Hacer but she once again, rudely refuses. Şakir finally snaps and comically attempts to kill her by pushing her off the window. She survives after she falls on Apti.

Next evening, Apti visits Hacer's house to finalize the marriage but unbeknownst to him Şakir and his mother, who is in bandages, are also in the house and they ask for Hacer's hand in marriage. Believing that a Municipal official has a more promising future than a street cleaner, Hacer's father breaks off her engagement with Apti. Angry and disappointed, Apti causes a scene but kicked out of the house. In a famous scene, Apti starts walking back home, throws flowers on the ground and eats the lokum by himself. ("Fuck your Flowers!")

Next day, Apti's doorman friend İsmail convinces him to kidnap and have sex with Hacer so her father would have no choice but marry her to him. Apti then sneaks into Hacer's house and attempts to rape her. However he is quickly beaten back by Hacer's kid brother and escapes. Chased by Hacer's father and brothers, Apti accidentally enters a nightclub and finds himself on the stage. In panic, he starts singing some popular folk songs and audience starts cheering for him. Owner of the nightclub quickly hires him as the lead singer.

Few days later posters with Apti's face fill the walls of the town. Realizing that she just rejected a rich husband for Şakir, Hacer falls ill. Hacer's father also tries to make things up with him but Apti, still angry over the earlier treatment he received, rudely rejects them and walks into the stage. His singing debut does not go well however, as his clumsiness gets the better of him and he causes accidents on the stage: he almost chokes a customer with mic's cord and accidentally removes the toupee of another. He is immediately fired and returns to his previous job of garbage man.

Some time later, Hacer and Şakir are now married but it is soon revealed that the marriage is not a happy one after Hacer causes a scene in the morning. Şakir's life turns absolutely miserable, now stuck between his bickering mother and foul-tempered Hacer. Apti breathes a sigh of relief, realizing that he just dodged a bullet by not marrying an insufferable woman like Hacer. Film ends with Apti happily noticing another young cleaner lady on a nearby window, implying that he might find love again.

== Cast ==
- Kemal Sunal - Apti Şakrak
- Şener Şen - Zabıta Officer Şakir
- Ayşen Gruda - Hacer
- İhsan Yüce - Hacer‘s father
- Erdal Özyağcılar - Hacer's older brother
- Türker Tekin - Doorman İsmail
- İlyas Salman - Doorman
- Nejat Gürçen - Gazino Boss
- İhsan Bilsev - The Patron Man
- Muadelet Tibet - Hanife
- Salih Sarikaya - Coffee Shop
- Nezahat Tanyeri - Mother of Shakir
- Nermin Özses - Mother of Hacer
- Ertuğrul Bilda

== Gallery ==
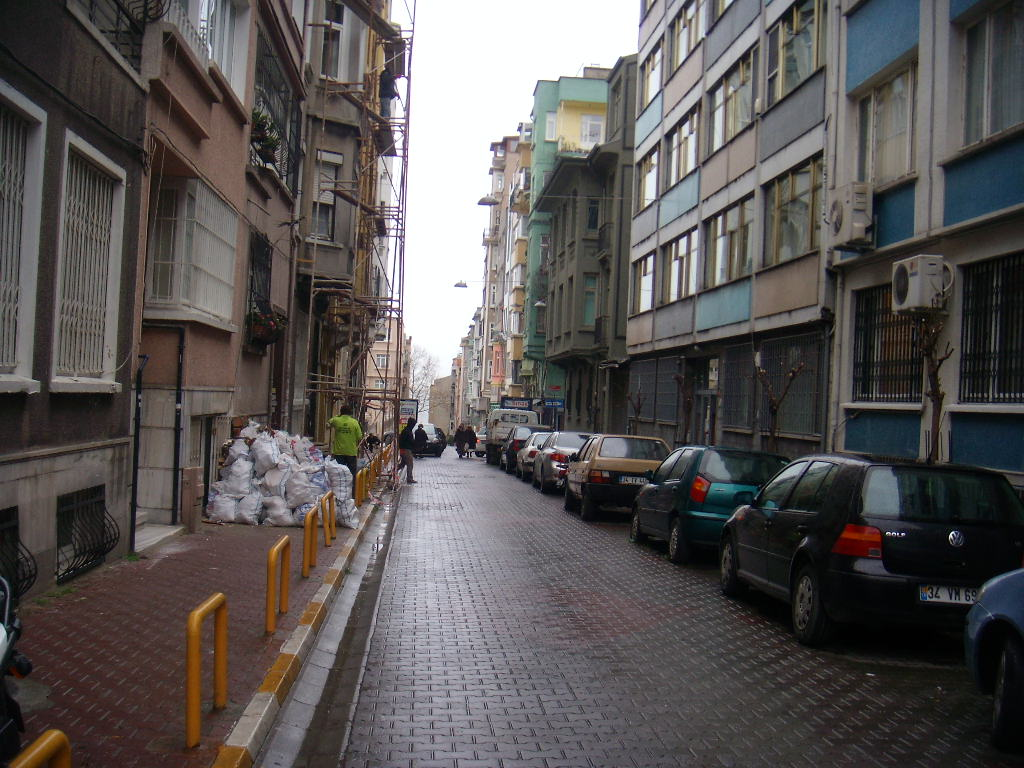
Cihangir Güneşli Street (the main location of the film)
