= From the Village to the City =

- Directed by: Ertem Eğilmez
- Starring: Kemal Sunal; Zeki Alasya
- Release date: 1974
- Running time: 77 minutes
- Country: Turkey
- Language: Turkish

From the Village to the City (Turkish: Köyden İndim Şehire) is a 1974 Turkish comedy film directed by Ertem Eğilmez. It tells the misadventurous story of four brothers who following their discovery of buried treasure head towards the city of Ankara, where hilariously unlucky events befall them. The movie functions as a sequel to a previous movie named Salak Milyoner starred by the same cast of "brothers".

== Plot ==
One day working on the field in some village of Kayseri, one of the brothers(Saffet) who rides ploughing tool through the soil cannot push it anymore, so calls for aid other brothers and after some try it is revealed that some old pot had been the cause for the obstruction which they threw aside recklessly till it shatters on tree trunk exposing all the gold in it.

Thus, judging themselves as wealthy, they are overjoyed and the only real problem for now is how to get all these treasure exchanged for a real currency. At last, they figure out Ali Rıza who is their fellow townsman as to be trusted the safest way to get this job implemented who owns a jewelry shop in Ankara.

Brothers become distrustful of one another fearing one of them might run away with the treasure and leave others nothing. Even when one brother needed to visit a restroom with the gold sack on his back, other brothers enter as well.

They set out to Ankara, but unbeknownst to them, on the day all four arrive in Ankara everybody seems to be celebrating some holiday. For that, Ali Rıza's shop is closed and is to be opened when the holiday ends. Disappointed by the news, all four temporarily begs and do hard road digging job to earn some little amount of money to not starve during the days Ali Rıza is absent. Now when finally Ali Rıza confronts them in his shop, they firstly present him only a few coins of gold to get exchanged for money. Ali Rıza seeing coins, realizes they are the Byzantine coins and suspects that they should have more of these gold if they have acquired it from some hidden treasure.

In the meantime, Ali Rıza (who is also after the treasure) by slyly using polite talk and providing accommodation for them will try to seek to obtain about the coins' whereabouts. On the other hand, brothers display some overprotective measures on the sack, such as, carrying it wherever they go and even when they eat their meals, thus causing Ali Rıza's suspicions gain more assurance that the sack might contain the rest of the coins. Brothers lastly try to bury the treasure to elude Ali Rıza, yet he gets to know where it is through his overhearing to the talk where Gayret divulges the secret and everybody is on the fight over to get their hands on the gold, resulting in all the coins being dispersed down the construction building leaving brothers poor again and they now have to toil on the same field as they used to do.

== Cast ==
- Kemal Sunal - Saffet
- Zeki Alasya - Himmet
- Metin Akpınar - Hayret
- Halit Akçatepe - Gayret
- Mine Mutlu - Brother-in-law of Ali Rıza Emmi
- Perran Kutman - Gülsüm
- Tekin Akmansoy - Ali Rıza Emmi(owner of the jewelry shop)
- Meral Zeren - Emine
- Leman Çıdamlı - Wife of Ali Rıza Emmi
- Mete İnselel - Receptionist
- Oya Alasya - Wife of Himmet
