= Kibar Feyzo =

- Directed by: Atıf Yılmaz
- Written by: İhsan Yüce
- Produced by: Nahit Ataman; Ertem Eğilmez
- Starring: Kemal Sunal; Şener Şen; İlyas Salman
- Music by: Ahmet Yamacı; Cahit Berkay
- Production company: Arzu Film
- Release date: 1978
- Running time: 83 min
- Country: Turkey
- Language: Turkish

Kibar Feyzo ("Feyzo, the Polite One") is a 1978 Turkish comedy film directed by Atıf Yılmaz.

== Plot ==
The film takes place in a feudal village in Southeastern Turkey in 1970s. Feyzo, a poor peasant, returns from military service dreaming about marrying Gülo, the love of his life. However, he has to face many obstacles. According to tradition, a man has to pay a lot of money to the bride's father in order to get the bride's hand. While Feyzo is trying to deal with the greed of Gülo's father, who is asking for an astronomical amount of money, he has to also convince his mother, who wants to buy an ox instead of a bride. Feyzo overcomes all these difficulties, but he gets kicked out of the village on his wedding day by the landlord, Maho Aga, who is eager to protect his status against any threat. However, Feyzo goes to the big city on exile only to bring back more problems for Maho.

== Cast ==
- Kemal Sunal - Feyzo
- Şener Şen - Maho Ağa
- İlyas Salman - Bilo
- Adile Naşit - Sakine
- Müjde Ar - Gülo
- İhsan Yüce - Hacı Hüso
