= Adile Naşit =

Turkish actress (1930–1987)

- Born: Adile Özcan; 17 June 1930; Istanbul, Turkey
- Died: 11 December 1987 (aged 57); Istanbul, Turkey
- Occupation: Actress
- Spouses: Ziya Keskiner (m. 1950; died 1982); Cemal İnce (m. 1983)
- Children: 1
- Father: Naşit Özcan

Adile Naşit (née Özcan; June 17, 1930 – December 11, 1987) was a Turkish actress and one of the ensemble cast in classic comedy films like Tosun Paşa, Süt Kardeşler, Şaban Oğlu Şaban, Ah Nerede. She is best known for her iconic laugh. Her on-screen partner is Münir Özkul in more than thirty movies like Hababam Sınıfı, Gülen Gözler, Bizim Aile, Neşeli Hayat, Mavi Boncuk, Gırgıriye, Aile Şerefi, Salak Milyoner. She also starred in many plays and a children's programme called Uykudan Önce as a storyteller.

== Biography ==
She was the daughter of Turkish comedian Naşit Özcan, and canto dancer, theater actress Amelya Hanım, and sister of theater actor Selim Naşit Özcan. Her father was ethnic Turk; her mother was Armenian and Greek

Adile Naşit was married, twice, to Cemal Ince and Ziya Keskiner. She starred with Kemal Sunal, Şener Şen and other prominent Turkish actresses and actors.

In 2016, Google Doodle commemorated her 86th birthday.

== Filmography ==
=== Film ===
- Yara (1947)
- Lüküs Hayat (1950) – (uncredited)
- İstanbul yıldızları (1952)
- Kahpe Kurşun (1957) – Rebiş
- Abbas Yolcu (1959) – Madam
- Cumbadan rumbaya (1960)
- Vur Patlasın Çal Oynasın (1970)
- Beyoğlu Güzeli (1971) – Madam
- Sev Kardeşim (1972) – Mesude
- Canım Kardeşim (1973) – Öğretmen
- Oh Olsun (1973) – Ferit'in Annesi
- Hasret (1974) – Sakat kızın Annesi
- Gariban (1974) – Hizmetçi Külyutmaz Mualla
- Salak Milyoner (1974) – Mesude
- Aç Gözünü Mehmet (1974)
- Yüz Lira ile Evlenilmez (1974) – Behice Hala
- Mavi Boncuk (1975) - Mıstık'ın Annesi
- Şehvet Kurbanı Şevket (1975) – Mahmure
- Pembe Panter (1975) – Hafize
- Şaşkın Damat (1975) – Öğretmen
- Delisin (1975) – Didar
- Hababam Sınıfı (1975) – Hafize Ana
- Bizim Aile: Merhaba (1975) – Melek
- Televizyon Çocuğu (1975) – Hüsniye
- Sevgili Halam (1975) – Sevgili Hala
- Rontgenci Sakir (1975) – Melek
- Minik Cadı (1975) – Babaanne
- İşte Hayat (1975) – Makbule
- Haydi Gençlik Hop Hop (1975)
- Hanzo (1975) – Şükriye
- Gece Kuşu Zehra (1975) – Hacer
- Çapkın Hırsız (1975) – Binnaz
- Bitirimler Sınıfı (1975) – Zehra Anne
- Ah Nerede (1975) – Huriye
- Plaj Horozu (1975)
- Hababam Sınıfı Sınıfta Kaldı (1976) – Hafize Ana
- Tosun Paşa (1976) – Adile Hanım
- Süt Kardeşler (1976) – Melek
- Ne Umduk Ne Bulduk (1976) – Fatma
- Gel Barışalım (1976) – Adile Turşucuoğlu
- Aile Şerefi (1976) – Emine
- Hababam Sınıfı Uyanıyor (1977) – Hafize Ana
- Hababam Sınıfı Tatilde (1977) Hafize Ana
- Gülen Gözler (1977) – Nezaket
- Ah Dede Vah Dede (1977)
- Sakar Şakir (1977) – Fatma
- Şaban Oğlu Şaban (1977) – Hala / Tavuk Teyze
- Kibar Feyzo (1978) – Sakine Ana
- Hababam Sınıfı Dokuz Doğuruyor (1978) – Hafize Ana
- Sultan (1978) – Ebe Hatice
- Neşeli Günler (1978) – Saadet
- Aşkın Gözyasi (1979)
- Vah Başımıza Gelenler (1979) – Fazilet Abla
- Ne Olacak Şimdi (1979) – Orhan'ın Annesi
- Köşe Kapmaca (1979) – Fazilet
- Erkek Güzeli Sefil Bilo (1979) – Sultan
- Doktor (1979) – Hatice
- Renkli Dünya (1980) – Fatma
- İbişo (1980) – Ağa
- Huzurum Kalmadı (1980) – Adile
- Beş Parasız Adam (1980)
- Hababam Sınıfı Güle Güle (1981) – Hafize Ana
- Şaka Yapma (1981) – Adile
- Şabancık (1981) – Adile
- Gırgıriye (1981) – Zekiye
- Deliler Koğuşu (1981)
- Davaro (1981) – Hamo
- Adile Teyze (1982) – Adile Teyze
- Gırgıriyede Şenlik Var (1982) – Zekiye
- Bizim Sokak (1982) – Cazgır Naciye
- Talih Kuşu (1982) – Adile Güney
- Görgüsüzler (1982) – Halime
- Buyurun Cümbüşe (1982)
- Şıngırdak Şadiye (1982) – Güllü
- Şaşkın Ördek (1983) – Meryem
- Gırgıriyede Büyük Seçim (1984) – Zekiye
- Namuslu (1984) – Anne
- Şabaniye (1984) – Hatice
- Şaban Pabucu Yarım (1985) – Adile
- Satmışım Anasını (1985) – Adile
- Kiralık Ev (1986) – Hayriye
- Yaygara (1986)
- Kuzucuklarım (1986) – Adile
- Iki Milyarlik Bilet (1986)
- Hayroş (1986)
- Ağa Bacı (1986) – Ağa Bacı
- Milyarder (1987) – Boncuk Sultan
- Gülmece Güldürmece (1987)
- Aile Pansiyonu (1987) – Saliha

=== Television ===
- Annem Annem
- Uykudan Önce (1981)
- Kuruntu Ailesi (1986)

Awards
Preceded by Hülya Koçyiğit	Golden Orange Award for Best Actress; 1976 for İşte Hayat	Succeeded by Semra Özdamar
