= Naşit Özcan =

Turkish actor

- Born: 1886; Istanbul, Ottoman Empire
- Died: 26 April 1943 (aged 56–57)
- Occupation: Actor
- Spouse(s): Leman Hanım; Amelya Hanım
- Children: 2, including Adile Naşit

Naşit Özcan (1886 – 26 April 1943) was a Turkish theater actor known for his performance of the "İbiş" character type.

== Biography ==
Özcan was born in 1886 in Istanbul Shehzadebashı. After studying at Bayezit High School, he completed his education at the Mızıka-ı Humayun. He had two children, Adile Naşit and Selim Naşit Özcan, who both followed in their father's career.

== Films and plays ==
- Haremağası Ut Meşkediyor
- Meşrutiyeti Osmaniye
- Bir Millet Uyanıyor
- İstanbul Sokaklarında
- Naşit Dolandırıcı
- Düğün Gecesi
- Beyimin Tiyatro Merakı
- Yahudi Doktorun Metresi
- İstanbul Çapkını
- Çifte Köy Düğünü
