= Şabaniye =

- Directed by: Kartal Tibet
- Starring: Kemal Sunal; Çigdem Tunç
- Release date: 1984
- Running time: 1h 33min
- Country: Turkey
- Language: Turkish

Şabaniye is a 1984 Turkish comedy film directed by Kartal Tibet.

== Cast ==
- Kemal Sunal - Şaban
- Çiğdem Tunç - Nazlı
- Erdal Özyagcilar - Şeyhmus
- Adile Naşit - Hatice
- Reha Yurdakul - Şef Garson
- Aliye Rona - Ayşe
- Turgut Boralı - Dursun
