= Hababam Sınıfı Sınıfta Kaldı =

- Directed by: Ertem Eğilmez
- Written by: Sadik Sendil; Rıfat Ilgaz (novel)
- Produced by: Ertem Eğilmez
- Starring: Kemal Sunal; Adile Naşit; Halit Akçatepe; Tarık Akan
- Cinematography: Kriton Ilyadis
- Music by: Melih Kibar
- Production company: Arzu Film
- Release date: 1 January 1976
- Running time: 91 mins.
- Country: Turkey
- Language: Turkish

Hababam Sınıfı Sınıfta Kaldı ("The Chaos Class Failed the Class") is a 1975 Turkish comedy film, directed by Ertem Eğilmez based on a novel by Rıfat Ilgaz. The film is a sequel to Hababam Sınıfı. It is the first film in which Şener Şen and Kemal Sunal starred together, and it is the last movie of Hababam Class starring Tarık Akan.

As of January 2026, the film is included on the IMDb Top 250 movies list.

== Plot ==
The "Hababam Class," having previously tricked Mahmut Hoca with forged diplomas, returns to Almca Private High School but soon finds itself at odds with Badi Ekrem, the new and strict physical education teacher. Known for his rigid discipline, Ekrem subjects the students to constant drills and forbids casual activities such as playing ball during class, much to their frustration.

Following the departure of the school's literature teacher, a young and idealistic replacement named Semra joins the faculty, offering a more empathetic presence in contrast to Ekrem's harsh methods. Meanwhile, Mahmut Hoca, now recovered from earlier troubles, returns to the school and seeks to resign from his position as vice principal. However, the headmaster refuses unless Mahmut meets certain conditions, creating further tension among the staff.

The Mahmut Hoca class warns Semra to treat Hoca with respect, but the class ignores Mahmut Hoca. At the first warning, the class students who used Semra Hoca as a cleaning arm in the teachers' room are smoking in the teachers' room. Mahmut Hoca apprehends the students and warns them not to make their first mistake. Ferit and Necmi, who discover that Şaban is in love with Semra Hoca, write a love letter to Şaban with their own hands, and Şaban is overjoyed when he reads these letters and begins to write love letters to Semra Hoca . Ferit and Necmi, after reading Şaban's responses, begin to write more letters.

After the initial warning, the Hababam class informed Semra Hoca that that day was the anniversary of Tevfik Fikret's death, and they leave school to go to the cemetery and invite Semra Hoca to the match, but if she doesn't, leave them to the Fenerbahçe match. Semra Hoca complains to Mahmut Hoca about the class. Mahmut Hoca also greets the class at the door and informs them that they will be disgraced if they stand on one foot in front of the entire school in the schoolyard. During the class, the teacher has a disagreement with Semra Hoca, and the teacher leaves the room to leave the school, but Semra is discouraged from making this request. When the genuine inspector learns that the inspector Hüseyin evki Topuz has arrived at the school, he enters the class on the inspector number supplied by Güdük Necmi previously, and Akil Hoca guesses that the same number has been made and throws the inspector out of the class, before informing the principal Akil Hoca that he is the genuine inspector.

When the Hababam Classroom discovers that the Minister of National Education is a student of Akil Hoca, they return him to school. Şaban, who believes Ferit and Necmi are from Semra Hoca, slapped Semra Hoca three times like a cow in the lecture, and the entire class wrote love letters on the exam papers in the teacher's exam. When the teacher sees this, he loses patience and disciplines the entire class. He also calls the parents of the students who will return to school to speak with them, and Semra Hoca realizes that the fault is not with the students but with their parents, and he forgives the entire class.

== Cast ==
- Kemal Sunal as İnek Şaban
- Münir Özkul as Mahmut Hoca (Vice Principal)
- Tarık Akan as Damat Ferit
- Adile Naşit as Hafize Ana
- Semra Özdamar - Semra Hoca
- Halit Akçatepe as Güdük Necmi
- Teoman Ayık - Öğrenci
- Feridun Şavlı - Domdom Ali
- Ahmet Arıman as Hayta İsmail
- Cem Gürdap as Tulum Hayri
- Şener Şen as Badi Ekrem (Physical Education teacher)
- Ertuğrul Bilda as Külyutmaz Hoca (Biology teacher)
- Kemal Ergüvenç as Kemal Hoca
- Akil Öztuna as Lütfü Hoca (Philosophy teacher)
- Muharrem Gürses as the headmaster
