= Aşk Fırtınası =

- Directed by: Halit Refiğ
- Starring: Kartal Tibet, Bahar Erdeniz, and Muzaffer Tema
- Release date: 1972
- Country: Turkey
- Language: Turkish

Aşk Fırtınası is a 1972 Turkish romantic drama film, directed by Halit Refiğ and starring Kartal Tibet, Bahar Erdeniz, and Muzaffer Tema.
