= Ortadirek Şaban =

1984 Turkish comedy film

- Directed by: Kartal Tibet
- Starring: Kemal Sunal; Bahar Öztan
- Release date: 1984
- Running time: 1h 22min
- Country: Turkey
- Language: Turkish

Ortadirek Şaban is a 1984 Turkish comedy film directed by Kartal Tibet.

== Cast ==
- Kemal Sunal - Şaban
- Bahar Öztan - Bahar Gökçe
- Yalçın Tülpar - Erkan
- Ergun Köknar - Adnan Bıçakçı
- Yavuzer Çetinkaya - Çete Reisi Çakal
- Reha Yurdakul - Şükrü Bey
