= King of the Doormen =

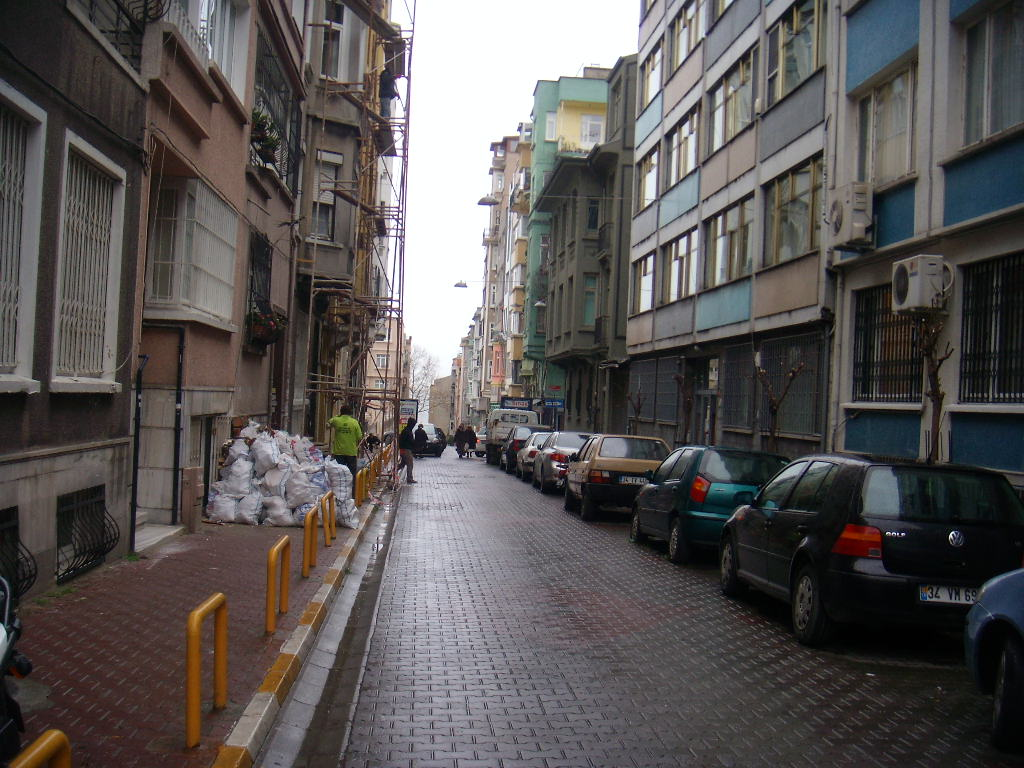
- Cihangir Gunesli Street where the movie The King of Doormen was shot
- Directed by: Zeki Ökten
- Screenplay by: Umur Bugay
- Story by: Alaaddin Durmaz
- Produced by: Arif Keskiner; Abdurrahman Keskiner
- Starring: Kemal Sunal; Bilge Zobu; Sevda Ferdağ; Şevket Altuğ; Sevil Üstekin
- Production company: Çiçek Film
- Release date: 1 May 1977 (Turkey)
- Running time: 84 minutes
- Country: Turkey
- Language: Turkish

King of the Doormen, (Turkish: Kapıcılar Kralı), is a 1976 Turkish comedy film featuring Kemal Sunal, Sevda Ferdağ, Bilge Zobu and Şevket Altuğ, produced by Arif and Abdurrahman Keskiner and, directed by Zeki Ökten. The movie is the third collaboration of Ökten and Sunal, following Hanzo and Şaşkın Damat, both shot in 1975. Kapıcılar Kralı is considered as one of the most memorable motion pictures of the career of Kemal Sunal. Along with Çöpçüler Kralı another movie of Sunal also directed by Zeki Ökten, Kapıcılar Kralı is also featured in the book 100 Yılın 100 Türk Filmi, written by Atilla Dorsay, Turkish film critic.

The movie has been generously awarded, winning best director and best actor awards at 1977 International Antalya Golden Orange Film Festival, in which it was also runner-up of best motion picture after Kara Çarşaflı Gelin of director and producer Süreyya Duru. Thus, Kemal Sunal became the first comedy-genre actor ever to win the award. Movie is also inducted at 100 Yıl 100 Film, a publicly voted list that is gathering 100 best motion pictures of Turkish cinema, in honour of its centenary, published by Ministry of Culture and Tourism of Turkey, in 2014. The movie is ranked 36th out of 100 movies in total, after an online-voted pool of 367,620 voters.

== Cast ==
- Kemal Sunal as Seyit (Note: Main character is credited as Seyyit at IMDb movie profile page, as well as in Milliyet newspaper's release on 22 November 1984, p.4 within section named Video Dünyasından Seçtiklerimiz [Our Choices From World of Video(s)].) the Housekeeper
- Bilge Zobu as Zafer, succeeding building administrator, retired colonel
- Özcan Özgür as Mahir the forger
- Sevda Ferdağ as partner of Mahir the forger, acting like his wife
- Şevket Altuğ as drunkard building resident
- Sevil Üstekin as Hacer, wife of Seyit
- Can Kolukısa as Fehmi, predecessor building administrator
- Güner Sümer as Nuri, car dealer, building resident
- Feridun Çölgeçen as Übeyit Baba, broker, building resident
- Yüksel Gözen as Mithat the Manager, building resident
- Ekrem Dümer as Doctor, building resident
- Hikmet Gül as Makbule, talebearer building resident
- Güler Ökten as Fehmi's wife, building resident
- Mete Sezer as Ferit the civil servant, building resident

== Music ==
The tracks, "Dımbıllı" and "Hüdeyda", used in varied scenes of the movie are composed by Arif Sağ, Turkish folkloric music singer and virtuoso, and arranged by Zafer Dilek. Two tracks are first released in Altın Bağlama, a 7" vinyl at 45 RPM single format by record label Türküola, in 1975. Dımbıllı is used as the intro, whereas Hüdeyda is used Kemal Sunal and Sevda Ferdağ are romantically involved while Ferdağ was deceiving Sunal to glom the apartment keys of Üveyit Baba, the rich broker living downstairs.

== Distribution ==
Released on 1 May 1977, the movie came out in varied theatres, including Özlem Sineması, Saray Sineması and Şan Sineması in Beyoğlu district, Bulvar Sineması, Hakan Sineması, İstanbul Sineması in other European side of Istanbul, and, Atlantik Sineması and Reks Sineması in Kadıköy district, Asian side of Istanbul.

== Reception ==
Kapıcılar Kralı is one of the all-time most favourite comedy movies of Turkey, holding the record of most aired local movie at national TV stations of Turkey in 2005, with total of 16 broadcasts.

== Awards ==
1977 International Antalya Golden Orange Film Festival

- Won – Best Director – Zeki Ökten
- Won – Best Actor – Kemal Sunal
