= Şaban, Son of Şaban =

- Directed by: Ertem Eğilmez
- Starring: Kemal Sunal; Şener Şen; Halit Akçatepe
- Release date: 1977
- Running time: 90 min
- Country: Turkey
- Language: Turkish

Şaban, Son of Şaban (Turkish: Şaban Oğlu Şaban) is a 1977 Turkish comedy film directed by Ertem Eğilmez.

== Cast ==
- Kemal Sunal - Şaban
- Şener Şen - Hüsamettin
- Halit Akçatepe - Ramazan
- Sıtkı Akçatepe - Nazır Paşa
- Şevket Altuğ - Yunus Kaptan
- Adile Naşit - Hala/Tavuk Teyze
- Ayşen Gruda - Safinaz
