= Şevket Altuğ =

Turkish actor (born 1943)

- Born: 13 March 1943 (age 83); Bandırma, Turkey
- Occupation: Actor
- Years active: 1962–2002
- Spouse: Jale Altuğ (m. 1971)
- Children: 2

Şevket Altuğ (born 13 March 1943) is a Turkish actor.

== Biography ==
Altuğ was born in Bandırma and grew up in Istanbul where he studied at Galatasaray High School. He began his theatre career in 1962 and worked continuously for five years at AEG. He married fellow theatre actress Jale Altuğ in 1971 and became the father of two children.

Altuğ acted in many cinema films in the 1970s and 1980s including Kapıcılar Kralı, Meraklı Köfteci, Aile Şerefi, Hasip ile Nasip, Mağlup Edilemeyenler, Şabanoğlu Şaban, Gülen Gözler, Hababam Sınıfı Dokuz Doğuruyor, Düşman, Dolap Beygiri, Yedi Bela Hüsnü, Şekerpare and Tokatçı. After making his television debut in Seyehatname, he played the part of Şakir in the comedy series Perihan Abla. Beginning in 1993, he played the lead role of Fikret ("Fiko") in Süper Baba which became one of the popular and beloved television series in Turkey.

== Filmography ==
Year	Title	Role	Notes
1975	İşte Hayat		
1976	Öyle Olsun	Şevki	
1976	Kapıcılar Kralı	Vodka seller	
1976	Meraklı Köfteci	Fatih	
1976	Aile Şerefi	Zihni	
1976	Hasip ile Nasip	District Governor Sadri	
1976	Mağlup Edilemeyenler	Nuri Acar	
1976	Gel Barışalım	Metin's working partner	
1976	Hababam Sınıfı Uyanıyor	Şevket	
1977	Şabanoğlu Şaban	Captain Yunus	
1977	Gülen Gözler	Şevket	
1977	Seyahatname	Abbas	
1978	Hababam Sınıfı Dokuz Doğuruyor	Şevket	
1979	Düşman	Abdullah	
1981	Hababam Sınıfı Güle Güle	Şevket	
1982	Dolap Beygiri	Manager	
1982	Yedi Bela Hüsnü	Cemal	
1983	Şekerpare	Hurşit	
1983	Tokatçı	Şevket	
1986	Perihan Abla	Şakir Uysal	
1990	Aşk Filmlerinin Unutulmaz Yönetmeni		Guest appearance
1991	İmdat ile Zarife	İmdat	
1992	Gölge Oyunu	Mahmut	
1993	Süper Baba	Fikret Aksu, Fiko	
2002	Unutma Beni	Semai Çağlayan	
