= Tosun Paşa =

- Directed by: Kartal Tibet
- Written by: Yavuz Turgul
- Produced by: Ertem Eğilmez; Nahit Ataman
- Starring: Kemal Sunal; Şener Şen; Adile Naşit; Ayşen Gruda; Müjde Ar; Zihni Göktay; Bilge Zobu; Ergin Orbey; Arap Celal; Sıtkı Akçatepe
- Cinematography: Kriton İlyadis
- Production company: Arzu Film
- Release date: 1 February 1976
- Running time: 85 minutes
- Country: Turkey
- Language: Turkish

Tosun Paşa is a 1976 Turkish comedy film, directed by Kartal Tibet and written by Yavuz Turgul. It starred Kemal Sunal, in his trademark character role of Şaban, as a butler who poses as the governor-general of Ottoman-ruled Egypt in an attempt to settle a dispute between two noble families over a lucrative parcel of land called The Green Valley. The film, which went on nationwide general release across Turkey on 1 February 1976, is one of the most popular productions from Ertem Eğilmez's Arzu Film and is particularly remembered for its musical score.

== Plot ==
The film is set in Ottoman-ruled Egypt in the 19th century. Two noble families are fighting for a lucrative parcel of land called the Green Valley. One family, led by Lütfü (Şener Şen) after his father becomes insane after receiving a harsh blow at the head, fears that they are falling behind in the bidding after the local governor's daughter (Müjde Ar) chooses to wed someone from the rival family, so they get their butler, Şaban (Kemal Sunal), to pretend to be the general-governor Tosun Paşa and turn the tide. Şaban, acting as Tosun Paşa tries to influence the governor into giving the Green Valley to Lütfü's family and have his daughter, Leyla, marry Lütfü. However, after seeing Leyla for the first time Şaban tries to woo Leyla, and after a quarrel with Lütfü, it is agreed that Lütfü keeps the Green Valley and Şaban gets Leyla. Meanwhile, the real Tosun Paşa arrives disguised as his brother Ibrahim Paşa to find out why someone has usurped his name. When all is discovered at the wedding, there is a large and iconic fight between the rival families, guests, and locals.

== Selected cast ==
- Kemal Sunal as Şaban (pretend Tosun Pasha)
- Müjde Ar as Leyla
- Şener Şen as Lütfü Tellioğlu
- Adile Naşit as Adile Tellioğlu
- Ayşen Gruda as Zekiye Tellioğlu
- Ergin Orbey as Vehbi Tellioğlu
