= Zühtü =

Zühtü is a Turkish given name. Notable people with the name include:

- Zühtü Arslan (born 1964), Turkish judge
- Zühtü Müridoğlu (1906–1992), Turkish sculptor
