= Bilge Zobu =

Turkish actor (born 1932)

- Born: 7 September 1932 (age 93); Istanbul, Turkey
- Occupation: Actor
- Years active: 1958–present

Bilge Zobu (born 7 September 1932) is a Turkish actor. He appeared in more than thirty films since 1958.

== Selected filmography ==
Year	Title	Role	Notes
1976	Tosun Paşa		
1977	King of the Doormen		
1983	Gırgıriyede Cümbüş Var		
1984	Namuslu		
2007	The White Angel		
