= Kemal Sunal =

Turkish actor and comedian (1944–2000)

- Born: Ali Kemal Sunal; 11 November 1944; Istanbul, Turkey
- Died: 3 July 2000 (aged 55); Istanbul, Turkey
- Resting place: Zincirlikuyu Cemetery, Şişli, Istanbul
- Education: Marmara University
- Occupation: Actor
- Years active: 1964–2000
- Spouse: Gül Sunal (m. 1975)
- Children: Ali Sunal; Ezo Sunal

Kemal Sunal (11 November 1944 – 3 July 2000) was a Turkish actor and comedian. He first attracted attention playing a side character in the drama film Canım Kardeşim (1973). Then, he rose to fame as a leading actor in iconic Turkish comedy films such as Köyden İndim Şehire (1974), Mavi Boncuk (1974), Hababam Sınıfı (1975), Hababam Sınıfı Sınıfta Kaldı (1975), Kapıcılar Kralı (1976), Süt Kardeşler (1976), Tosun Paşa (1976), Çöpçüler Kralı (1977), Hababam Sınıfı Tatilde (1977), Şaban Oğlu Şaban (1977), Kibar Feyzo (1978) and Zübük (1980). His final acting role was in the drama film Propaganda (1999).

== Career ==
Kemal Sunal graduated from Vefa Lisesi (Vefa High School). In his early ages, he started pursuing what was to become a long and successful acting career in minor roles in various theatres. For a brief period, he worked in the Kenterler Theatre and debuted in the play Zoraki Tabip. He was later transferred to the Devekuşu Kabare Theatre, where he performed his acting.

He was recognized as a real talent, and started receiving offers for movies with larger budgets and a more famous cast. His first major role was in the film Tatlı Dillim ("My Sweet Talker"), directed by Ertem Eğilmez. In a matter of years, Sunal co-starred alongside Halit Akçatepe, Şener Şen and Münir Özkul.

Perhaps the most famous of all his roles was in Hababam Sınıfı (The Outrageous Class), in which he played the character Şaban, whom most of his classmates called İnek ("Nerd") Şaban. İnek Şaban was constantly bullied and humiliated by his friends, but this never kept him from thinking the unthinkable, like digging a tunnel to escape school grounds (which later, turned out to lead to the vice-principal's office) or smoking in the school attic. The character was so pure and so fixed in the memories of the Turkish people, it was never replaced by another actor in the recent re-shootings of Hababam Sınıfı, most probably as a sign of respect to Sunal.

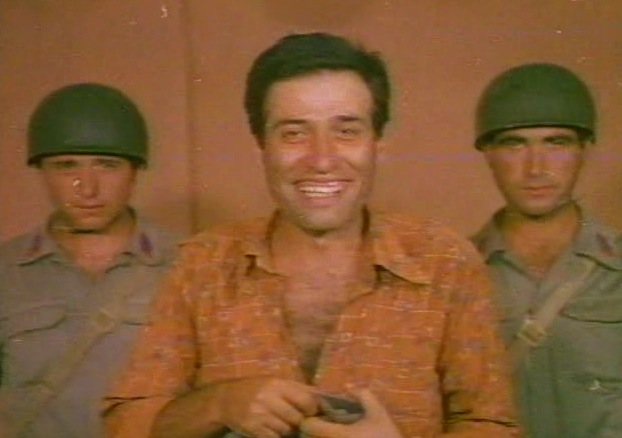
A scene from the movie Kibar Feyzo 1978, starring Kemal Sunal

His other notable roles include the title character in Tosun Paşa ("Tosun Pasha"; 1976), Süt Kardeş Şaban in Süt Kardeşler ("The Foster Brothers"; 1976), and Apti—a street sweeper who falls in love with a municipal inspector's fiancée—in Çöpçüler Kralı ("The King of the Street Sweepers"; 1978). He also portrayed a former hospital janitor posing as a doctor in Doktor Civanım ("My Dear Doctor"; 1982) and a naive man attempting to become an athlete to win his crush's affection in Ortadirek Şaban ("Middle Class Şaban"; 1984).

The huge popularity of his movies stemmed not only from their unique humour but also their depiction of the many problems faced by the poor rural people in Turkey during the 1970s and 1980s. In almost all of his films, Kemal Sunal plays a poor man, trying to make a living.

Sunal's last film was Propaganda, which was directed by Sinan Çetin. Sunal played a customs officer-in-charge (presumably) on the Syria–Turkey border. Being a serious drama, this film was a contrast to his other works. As the plot unfolded, Sunal's character fell into despair, trying to survive the dilemma between his duties as an officer of the law and his duties as a friend. In the public opinion, this film was not the best of his works. Another significant fact about this film is that it also included Ali Sunal, Kemal Sunal's son, cast as a junior customs officer.

== Personal life ==
Sunal kept himself and his family away from the media and rarely appeared in public. His family originates from the village of Pütürge, in the Doğanyol District of Malatya. People who knew him have commented on how serious he was in his real life, in contrast to the funny characters he played in his movies. Whilst he was at the top of his career, he decided to finish university, which he had dropped out of in his early career. Despite his fame, he attended the university like a regular student and stated that "that was the way he liked it to be".

Sunal's dreams of higher-education were disrupted in 1980, during the period of military takeover. His attempts to earn a degree finally paid off in 1995, when he earned his bachelor's degree in Radio Television and Cinema Studies from Marmara University. He then decided to pursue a master's degree (the topic of this thesis being himself), which he earned in 1998, also from Marmara University. This incident was covered by the media with headlines like "İnek Şaban Master Yaptı" (Şaban the Cow got a master's degree) while his 'classmates' from Hababam Sinifi made comments like "Profesorluk Bekliyoruz" ("We expect professorship"). At his graduation ceremony, he made a speech joking that his path of first working and then attending university later in life was better as it allowed him to gain real life experience first.

== Death ==
Kemal Sunal died on July 3, 2000, as a result of a sudden heart attack aboard a flight to Trabzon just before take-off. He was reported to be afraid of flying. His death caused mourning that swept the entire nation and dominated news coverage for many days. He was interred at the Zincirlikuyu Cemetery in Istanbul.

Kemal Sunal and his wife Gül Sunal (born 1957) had two children, Ali Sunal (born 1977) and Ezo Sunal (born 1985).

== Filmography ==
=== Films ===
Year	Film	Role	Notes
1972	Tatlı Dillim	Basketballer	Debut role
1973	Canım Kardeşim	Yolcu	
1973	Yalancı Yarim	Kemal	
1973	Oh Olsun	Fazıl	
1973	Güllü Geliyor Güllü	Hit man	
1974	Hasret	Yanık	
1974	Salak Milyoner	Saffet	
1974	Köyden İndim Şehire	Saffet	
1974	Salako	Salako	First leading role
1974	Mavi Boncuk	Kaymakam Cafer	
1975	Şaşkın Damat	Apti	
1975	Hababam Sınıfı	İnek (Cow) Şaban	
1975	Hanzo	Hanzo / Cabbar	Dual role
1975	Hababam Sınıfı Sınıfta Kaldı	İnek (Cow) Şaban	
1976	Tosun Paşa	Şaban / Tosun Pasha	
1976	Süt Kardeşler	Şaban	
1976	Sahte Kabadayı	Kemal	
1976	Meraklı Köfteci	Zühtü Karışan	
1976	Kapıcılar Kralı	Seyid	
1976	Hababam Sınıfı Uyanıyor	İnek (Cow) Şaban	
1977	Hababam Sınıfı Tatilde	İnek (Cow) Şaban	
1977	Sakar Şakir	Şakir	
1977	Şabanoğlu Şaban	Şaban	
1977	İbo İle Güllüşah	İbrahim	
1977	Çöpçüler Kralı	Abdi Şakrak	
1978	Avanak Apti	Apti	
1978	Kibar Feyzo	Feyzo	
1978	Köşeyi Dönen Adam	Adem	
1978	Yüz Numaralı Adam	Şaban	
1978	İyi Aile Çocuğu	Kemal / Cemal	Dual role
1978	İnek Şaban	Şaban / Bülent	Dual role
1979	Umudumuz Şaban	Ringo Şaban	
1979	Şark Bülbülü	Şaban Ballıses	
1979	Korkusuz Korkak	Mülayim Sert	
1979	Dokunmayın Şabanıma	Şaban	
1979	Bekçiler Kralı	Şaban Özgüneş	
1980	Zübük	İbrahim Zübükzade	
1980	Devlet Kuşu	Mustafa	
1980	Gerzek Şaban	Osman / Seyfi	Dual role
1980	Gol Kralı	Sait Sarıoğlu	
1981	Üç Kağıtçı	Rıfkı	
1981	Kanlı Nigar	Narçın / Abdi	Dual role
1981	Davaro	Memo Davaro	
1982	Yedi Bela Hüsnü	Hüsnü	
1982	Doktor Civanım	Kemal	
1983	Tokatçı	Osman	
1983	Kılıbık	Kamil	
1983	En Büyük Şaban	Şaban	
1983	Çarıklı Milyoner	Bayram	
1984	Postacı	Yandan Çarklı Adem	
1984	Şabaniye	Şaban / Şabaniye	
1984	Ortadirek Şaban	Şaban	
1984	Atla Gel Şaban	Niyazi	
1985	Sosyete Şaban	Şaban Ağa / Dilaver Bey	Dual role
1985	Şendul Şaban	Şaban	
1985	Şaban Papuçu Yarım	Şaban	
1985	Keriz	Zülfü	
1985	Katma Değer Şaban	Şaban	
1985	Gurbetçi Şaban	Şaban	Filmed in Cologne
1986	Yoksul	Yoksul	
1986	Garip	Kemal	
1986	Tarzan Rıfkı	Tarzan Rıfkı	
1986	Deli Deli Küpeli	Kaymakam	
1986	Davacı	Yunus	
1987	Yakışıklı	Selim	
1987	Kiracı	Kerim	
1987	Japon İşi	Veysel	
1988	Düttürü Dünya	Dütdüt Mehmet	
1988	Uyanık Gazeteci	Ali	
1988	Sevimli Hırsız	Metin Mertoglu	
1988	Polizei	Ali Ekber	Filmed in West Berlin
1988	Öğretmen	Teacher Hüsnü	
1988	İnatçı	Bayram	
1988	Bıçkın	Ali / Himself	Dual role
1989	Zehir Hafiye	Cemal	
1989	Talih Kuşu	Osman Abalı	
1989	Gülen Adam	Yusuf Şaplak	
1990	Abuk Sabuk Bir Film	Âdemoğlu	
1990	Koltuk Belası	Zühtü Kaya	
1990	Boynu Bükük Küheylan	İbrahim Küheylan	
1991	Varyemez	Ragıp Elibol	
1999	Propaganda	Mehdi	final leading role

=== Television ===
Year	Title	Role	Notes
1992	Saygılar Bizden	Mübasir Riza	
1993	Şaban Askerde	Şaban	28 episodes
1994	Bay Kamber	Bay Kamber	11 episodes
1997	Şaban İle Şirin	Şaban	3 episodes

== Awards ==
- 1977: 14. Antalya Film Şenliği (14th Antalya Film Festival), Best Actor, Kapıcılar Kralı
- 1998: 35. Antalya Film Şenliği (35th Antalya Film Festival), Lifetime honorary award, Kapıcılar Kralı
- 1989: 2. Ankara Film Şenliği (2nd Ankara Film Festival), Best Actor, Düttürü Dünya

== Books ==
Year	Title	Publisher	ISBN
1998	TV ve Sinemada Kemal Sunal Güldürüsü	Sel Yayınları	ISBN 9755702628
2001	Kemal Sunal Güldürüsü	Om Yayınevi	ISBN 9756827793

== See also ==
- Şener Şen
- Nazan Saatci, from movie Tokatçı (1983)

Awards and achievements
Preceded by Cüneyt Arkın	Golden Orange Award for Best Actor; 1977 for Kapıcılar Kralı	Succeeded by Tarık Akan
