= Ayşen Gruda =

Turkish actress and comedian (1944–2019)

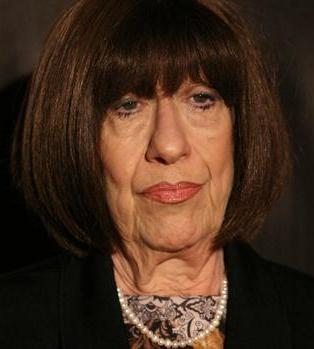
- Gruda in 2017
- Born: Ayşen Erman; 22 August 1944; Yeşilköy, Istanbul, Turkey
- Died: 23 January 2019 (aged 74); Istanbul, Turkey
- Resting place: Zincirlikuyu Cemetery, Istanbul
- Occupations: Actress, comedian
- Years active: 1963–2018
- Spouse: Yılmaz Gruda (m. 1965; div. 1976)
- Children: 1

Ayşen Gruda (22 August 1944 – 23 January 2019) was a Turkish actress and comedian.

== Biography ==
Ayşen Gruda was born on 22 August 1944 in Istanbul. Her sisters Ayten and Ayben also went on to become actresses.

Gruda appeared in several musicals such as "Mum Söndü", "Deve Kuşu Kabare", "Hababam Sınıfı Müzikali", and "Yedi Kocalı Hürmüz". Her role in the sketch Her Domates Güzeli Nahide Şerbet on television, gained her the nickname "Domates Güzeli". She appeared in over 100 films, including such classic movies as; Tosun Paşa, Süt Kardeşler, Gülen Gözler, Şabanoğlu Şaban, Hababam Sınıfı, and Neşeli Günler.

Gruda died on 23 January 2019 of pancreatic cancer in Istanbul, aged 74. She was interred at the Zincirlikuyu Cemetery.

Awards
Preceded by Damla Sönmez	Golden Orange Award for Best Supporting Actress; 2010 for Kağıt	Succeeded by Tilbe Saran
