= Rıfat Ilgaz =

Turkish teacher, writer and poet (1911–1993)

- Born: Mehmet Rıfat Ilgaz; 7 May 1911; Cide, Kastamonu Vilayet, Ottoman Empire
- Died: 7 July 1993 (aged 82); Istanbul, Turkey
- Resting place: Zincirlikuyu Cemetery, Istanbul
- Occupations: Author, teacher, poet
- Writing career
- Pen name: Stepne
- Genre: Humour

Rıfat Ilgaz (7 May 1911 – 7 July 1993) was a Turkish teacher, writer and poet. He became especially known for his novel "Hababam Sınıfı". He maintained a socialist line both in his writings and in his personal life. His magazine work, which continued Turkey's most turbulent political flow, caused him to spend time in courthouse corridors and prison, like many writers of the same period.[8] In his very productive literary life, he wrote works in many different fields, from poetry to humorous stories, from novels to children's books. His work "Karartma Geceleri", which was once confiscated, was included in the list of 100 Essential Works in 2004.[9] The author's works are now protected by Çınar Publications, which he founded together with his son Aydın Ilgaz. These books are printed by Türkiye İş Bankası Kültür Yayınları.[10]

== Biography ==
Ilgaz was born in Cide, in the Kastamonu Vilayet of the Ottoman Empire (present-day Turkey). Ilgaz was one of Turkey’s best-known and most prolific poets and writers, having authored over sixty works. Ilgaz started writing poetry during his junior school years and evolved into one of the prolific social-realist writers of the 20th-century Turkish literature. His poems are considered prime examples of socialist-realistic writing. While he has never really been a partisan of political ideologies, the fact that he has written about the sufferings of the people placed him at a left wing perspective. Like other writers of his time, Ilgaz was imprisoned as a result of one of his publications.Rıfat Ilgaz's novel Sarı Yazma (The Yellow Headscarf) serves as an autobiographical account while simultaneously depicting the struggles of a generation of Turkish intellectuals. Ilgaz penned Sarı Yazma to chronicle his own life from childhood through his mid-forties, including his education, teaching career, literary journey, and experiences in prison and sanatoriums. The narrative prominently features his deep connection to his hometown of Cide, Kastamonu, where he spent his early years. Beyond personal history, the novel acts as a social commentary, illustrating Turkey's political landscape and literary scene from the Turkish War of Independence to the 1950s. It particularly highlights the hardships faced by the 1940 Generation of social realist intellectuals, who endured political pressures, exiles, poverty, and suffering. Ilgaz expressed his motivation as a desire to "start anew, to be reborn and live, to grow and age, and to look back at the past more consciously and enjoy it," indicating a reflective engagement with his life experiences and the broader societal context. The title, Sarı Yazma, symbolizes the hardworking women of the Black Sea region.

In addition to his writing, Ilgaz led an accomplished career as a lecturer in Turkish literature. He was among the contributors of the literary magazine Adımlar between 1943 and 1944. In 1946 he founded a leading satirical weekly magazine, Marko Paşa, with Aziz Nesin and Sabahattin Ali.

Ilgaz died in Istanbul on 7 July 1993 due to lung failure. He was buried at Zincirlikuyu Cemetery.

== English language bibliography ==
One collection of Ilgaz's short stories has been published in English translation.

=== Fourth Company ===
A 2001 short story collection by Turkish writer Ilgaz published by Milet Books, in dual Turkish and English translation by Damian Croft, as part of its series of Turkish-English Short Story Collections.

The publisher states that, “In the deftly comic six-part story, Fourth Company and two further stories, Rifat Ilgaz turns his sharp but affectionate wit on compulsory military service, holidays at home and the pathological fear of doctors.”

The volume consists of the stories;

- Fourth Company (Parts 1–6)
- Off to Exchange Bayram Greetings
- A Fear of Doctors

==== Editions ====
- Fourth Company. trans. Damian Croft. London: Milet Books. 2001. ISBN 978-1-84059-298-6.

== Selected works ==
- Apartıman Çocukları
- Bacaksız Okulda
- Bacaksız Plajda
- Cart Curt
- Çalış Osman Çiftlik Senin
- Devam
- Don Kişot Istanbul'da
- Garibin Horozu
- Geçmişe Mazi
- Güvercinim Uyur mu?
- Hababam Sınıfı (1975) (made into a movie)
- Hababam Sınıfı Sınıfta Kaldı (1975) (made into a movie)
- Hababam Sınıfı Baskında (made into a movie)
- Hababam Sınıfı İcraatın İçinde
- Hababam Sınıfı Uyanıyor
- Hoca Nasrettin Ve Çömezleri
- Karadeniz'in Kıyıcığında
- Karartma Geceleri (1990) (made into a movie)
- Kırk Yıl Once Kırk Yıl Sonra
- Kulağımız Kirişte
- Nerde Kalmıştık
- Nerde O Eski Usturalar
- Ocak Katırı Alagöz
- Öksüz Civciv
- Pijamalılar
- Radarın Anahtarı
- Rüşvetin Alamancası
- Sarı Yazma
- Sınıf
- Soluk Soluğa/Karakılçık/Uzak Değil
- Sosyal Kadınlar Partisi
- Şeker Kutusu
- Üsküdar'da Sabah Oldu
- Yarenlik
- Yaşadıkça
- Yıldız Karayel
- Yokuş Yukarı
- Halime Kaptan

== See also ==
- List of contemporary Turkish poets
