= Semra Özdamar =

Turkish actress

- Born: 11 January 1956 (age 70); Bursa, Turkey
- Occupation: Actress
- Years active: 1973-1978

Semra Özdamar (born 11 January 1956) is a Turkish actress. She is best known for her performance as Semra Hoca in the Hababam Sınıfı Sınıfta Kaldı.
