= Hababam Sınıfı =

- Theatrical Poster
- Directed by: Ertem Eğilmez
- Written by: Umur Bugay; Rıfat Ilgaz (novel)
- Produced by: Nihat Ataman; Ertem Eğilmez
- Starring: Kemal Sunal; Adile Naşit; Halit Akçatepe; Tarık Akan; Münir Özkul; Muharrem Gürses; Kani Kıpçak
- Cinematography: Hüseyin Özşahin
- Edited by: İsmail Kalkan
- Music by: Melih Kibar
- Production company: Arzu Film
- Release date: 1 April 1975
- Running time: 85 min
- Country: Turkey
- Language: Turkish

Hababam Sınıfı (The Chaos Class) is a 1975 Turkish comedy film, directed by Ertem Eğilmez based on a novel by Rıfat Ilgaz, featuring an ensemble cast including Kemal Sunal, Tarık Akan and Münir Özkul that tells the adventures of a private school class students who are challenged by the arrival of a new headmaster. The film, which went on nationwide general release on 1 April 1975, was a success in Turkey and was followed by five direct sequels; Hababam Sınıfı Sınıfta Kaldı ("The Chaos Class Failed The Class", 1975), Hababam Sınıfı Uyanıyor ("The Chaos Class is Waking Up", 1976), Hababam Sınıfı Tatilde ("The Chaos Class is On Vacation", 1977), Hababam Sınıfı Dokuz Doğuruyor ("The Chaos Class is fretting over", 1978) and Hababam Sınıfı Güle Güle ("The Chaos Class: Bye Bye", 1981). The enduring popularity of the series resulted in three later sequels; Hababam Sınıfı Merhaba ("The Chaos Class Welcome", 2004), Hababam Sınıfı Askerde ("The Chaos Class in the Military", 2005) and Hababam Sınıfı Üç Buçuk ("The Chaos Class Three and a Half," 2006)

== Plot ==
A group of lazy, ignorant highschool students, in no rush to graduate, have settled into life at their private school, paid by aloof parents, where they have bonded as a family and are cared for by school attendant Mother Hafize who has accepted them as her real sons. Their kingdom over the school is challenged by a new vice principal who, despite his warm hearted nature, takes on the role of tough disciplinarian and becomes the butt of their tricks and jokes as he prepares them for life.

== Cast ==
- Kemal Sunal as İnek Şaban
- Münir Özkul as Mahmut Hoca
- Tarık Akan as Damat Ferit
- Adile Naşit as Hafize Ana
- Halit Akçatepe as Güdük Necmi
- Ahmet Arıman as Hayta İsmail
- Cem Gürdap as Tulum Hayri
- Feridun Şavlı as Domdom Ali
- Sitki Akçatepe as Paşa Nuri (Physics teacher)
- Ertuğrul Bilda as Külyutmaz Hoca (Biology teacher)
- Kemal Ergüvenç as Kemal Hoca
- Akil Öztuna as Lütfü Hoca (Philosophy teacher)
- Muharrem Gürses as the headmaster
