= Melih Kibar =

Turkish composer

Background information
- Born: 6 September 1951; Istanbul, Turkey
- Died: 7 April 2005 (aged 53) Istanbul, Turkey
- Genres: Pop
- Occupation: Composer
- Website: www.melki.com.tr

Melih Kibar (6 September 1951 – 7 April 2005) was a Turkish composer.

== Biography ==
Born in Istanbul, he graduated from the German High School Istanbul and studied chemical engineering at Boğaziçi University. He received a Master's degree from the University of Wales, University College of Swansea.

At the age of eight, Kibar enrolled at the Conservatory of Istanbul Municipality. He started his musical career in the school years and won a first prize as composer at the Milliyet High School Music Contest in 1970. Until 1975 he worked with Timur Selçuk. One of his earliest compositions was Çoban Yıldızı, a jingle for Eurovision Song Contest national selection. Since 1975, he composed 273 tunes, 9 musicals and 32 film musicals in cooperation with various artists, in particular with lyricist Çiğdem Talu. In 1976, he received the Golden Orange prize for the soundtrack of the film "Hababam Sınıfı". Melih Kibar participated in various international festivals and was winner of many prizes in Turkey and abroad. At the Eurovision Song Contest 1986 held in Bergen, Norway, his song "Halley" and at the Eurovision Song Contest 1995 held in Dublin, Ireland, his another song "Sev!" represented Turkey.

Melih Kibar died of skin cancer on 7 April 2005 at a hospital in Istanbul. He was taken there two days before his death. He was laid to rest at Nakkaştepe Cemetery following the religious funeral held at Bebek Mosque. He is survived by his wife Ethel and his daughter Merve.

== Discography ==
- Yadigar, 2001
- Saat Sabahın Dokuzu, 2003
- Hababam Sınıfı-Merhaba, 2004

Awards
Preceded by Attila Özdemiroğlu- Şanar Yurdatapan	Golden Orange Award for Best Music Score; 1976 for Hababam Sınıfı Sınıfta Kaldı	Succeeded by Cahit Berkay
