= Münir Özkul =

Turkish actor

- Born: 15 August 1925; Bakırköy, Istanbul, Turkey
- Died: 5 January 2018 (aged 92); Beyoğlu, Istanbul, Turkey
- Occupation: Actor
- Years active: 1940–2015
- Spouses: Suna Selen (divorced) Umman Özkul (m. 1986)
- Children: 3

Münir Özkul (15 August 1925 – 5 January 2018) was a Turkish cinema and theatre actor who was awarded the title of "State Artist of Turkey". In 1972, he won a Golden Orange Award for Best Actor for his performance in Sev Kardeşim.

== Career ==
Özkul completed his education at the Istanbul Boys High School (İstanbul Erkek Lisesi). He then started his acting career in the Bakırköy Halkevi theatre. Later he worked in the Ankara State theatre and İstanbul Şehir theatre. He became famous for his role in Muhsin Ertuğrul's Fareler ve İnsanlar (Mice and Men).

From the 1950s onwards, he became a prolific film actor associated with Yeşilçam. During the 1970s, he appeared in many of director Ertem Eğilmez's films such as Hababam Sınıfı, Şabanoğlu Şaban, Mavi Boncuk, Banker Bilo and Namuslu. In many of these films he was paired with the actress Adile Naşit. Others of his films include Edi ile Büdü, Halıcı Kız, Kalbimin Şarkısı, Miras Uğruna, Balıkçı Güzeli, Neşeli Günler, Gülen Yüzler, Gırgıriye, Görgüsüzler, Bizim Aile and Aile Şerefi. In the 1980s, he acted in several television series including Uzaylı Zekiye, Ana Kuzusu and Şaban ile Şirin.

== Personal life ==
Özkul married four times and had three children. His second wife was actress Suna Selen.

In 1998, he was awarded the title of "State Artist of Turkey" by the Turkish Ministry of Culture.

He struggled with alcoholism for a number of years but stopped drinking completely in the 1990s. From 2003 he suffered from dementia and chronic obstructive pulmonary disease. In the years leading up to his death, he used to think that many people whom he knew in the past were still alive. On 5 January 2018, he died at his home in Cihangir, Beyoğlu, at the age of 92. After his funeral prayers were performed at Teşvikiye Mosque, his body was buried in Bakırköy Cemetery.

== Filmography ==
=== Film ===
Film
Year	Title	Role	Notes
1945	Yayla Kartalı		
1950	Üçüncü Selim'in Gözdesi		
1951	Lale Devri		
1951	Yavuz Sultan Selim ve Yeniçeri Hasan		
1951	Vatan ve Namık Kemal		
1951	Evli Mi Bekar Mı		Short
1951	Barbaros Hayreddin Paşa	Mimar Selim	
1952	Edi ile Büdü Tiyatrocu		
1953	Edi ile Büdü		
1953	Halıcı Kız		
1953	Balıkçı Güzeli		
1955	Tuş / Bir Aşk Hikayesi		
1955	Bir Aşk Hikayesi		
1956	Miras Uğrunda		
1956	Kalbimin Şarkısı	Münir	
1958	İftira		
1958	Altın Kafes		
1959	Gurbet		
1960	Taş Bebek	Atif	
1961	Yumurcak		
1961	Yaman Gazeteci	Yaman	
1961	Bir Bahar Akşamı		
1965	Yalancının Mumu		
1965	Sonsuz Geceler	Zühtü	
1965	Şoför Nebahat Bizde Kabahat		
1965	Seveceksen Yiğit Sev		
1965	Senede Bir Gün		
1965	Şekerli misin Vay Vay		
1965	Kart Horoz	Mistik	
1965	Kan Gövdeyi Götürdü	Zehir Hafiye	
1965	Kahreden Kurşun	Tencere Münir	
1965	İnatçı Gelin		Short
1965	Gönül Kuşu		
1965	Dokunma Bozulurum		
1965	Cezmi Band 007.5		
1965	Bilen Kazanıyor		
1965	65 Hüsnü		
1966	Sevgilim Bir Artistti		
1966	Seni Seviyorum		
1966	Fakir Bir Kız Sevdim		
1966	Denizciler Geliyor		
1966	Bir Millet Uyanıyor	Tilki Onbaşı	
1966	Ben Bir Sokak Kadınıyım		
1967	Askin kanunu		
1967	Sürtüğün Kızı		
1967	Yaşlı Gözler		
1967	Ölünceye Kadar	Rifat	
1967	Elveda		
1967	Çifte Tabancalı Damat		
1968	İstanbul'da Cümbüş Var		
1968	Yayla Kartalı		
1968	Urfa İstanbul	Doktor	
1968	Nilgün		
1968	Kara Gözlüm Efkarlanma		
1968	Kanlı Nigar	Apti	
1968	Kalbimdeki Yabancı		
1968	Artık Sevmeyeceğim	Ahmet	
1969	Uykusuz Geceler		
1969	Sevgili Babam		
1969	Sevdalı Gelin		
1969	Nisan Yağmuru		
1969	Gelin Ayşem		
1969	Fakir Kızı Leyla		
1969	Boş Çerçeve	Ferhat	
1969	Bana Derler Fosforlu		
1969	Ayşecik'le Ömercik	Sansar Nuri	
1970	Yuvasız Kuşlar		
1970	Yumruk Pazarı		
1970	Yavrum	Ayse's Grandfather	
1970	Tatlı Meleğim		
1970	Tarkan: Gümüs Eyer		
1970	Son Kızgın Adam		
1970	Şoför Nebahat		
1970	Seven Ne Yapmaz		
1970	Küçük Hanımefendi	Bülent	
1970	Kara Dutum		
1970	Kalbimin Efendisi		
1970	Hayatım Sana Feda	Mehmet	
1970	Dönme Bana Sevgilim		
1970	Dikkat Kan Aranıyor		
1970	Bütün Aşklar Tatlı Başlar		
1970	Berduş Kız		
1970	Arım, Balım, Peteğim	Zeynep's father	
1970	Alli yemeni		
1970	Ali İle Veli		
1970	Adsiz cengaver		Voice, Uncredited
1971	7 Kocalı Hürmüz	Berber Hasan	
1971	Tophaneli Ahmet	Abdi	
1971	Son Hıçkırık		
1971	Solan Bir Yaprak Gibi		
1971	Senede Bir Gün		
1971	Nasreddin Hoca		
1971	İşte Deve İşte Hendek		
1971	İbiş Gangsterlere Karşı		
1971	Hayat Sevince Güzel		
1971	Hayatım Senindir		
1971	Donkişot Sahte Şövalye		
1971	Beyoğlu Güzeli		
1971	Beyaz Kelebekler		
1971	Beklenen Şarkı		
1971	Bebek Gibi Maşallah		
1971	Aşk Uğruna	Mestan	
1971	Aşk Hikâyesi	Şeker Ahmet	
1971	Ayşecik ve Sihirli Cüceler Rüyalar Ülkesinde		
1972	Kezban Paris'te		
1972	Gönül Hırsızı	Salih Reis	
1972	Yiğitlerin Kaderi		
1972	Üç Sevgili		
1972	Tövbekar	Güner'in Babasi	
1972	Tophaneli Murat		
1972	Tatlı Dillim		
1972	Sev Kardeşim	Mesut Güler	
1972	O Ağacın Altında		
1972	Karamanın Koyunu		
1972	Aslanların Ölümü		
1973	Ver Allahım Ver		
1973	Kadifeden Kesesi		
1973	Yalancı Yarim	Dervis	
1973	Şaban İstanbul'da		
1973	Oh Olsun	Burhan Usta	
1973	Izdırap	Ahmet	
1973	Çulsuz Ali		
1974	Niyet	Rifki	
1974	Hasret	Ferdi'nin Dayisi	
1974	Gariban	Şair Cevat	
1974	Salak Milyoner	Mehmet Çavus	
1974	Beş Tavuk Bir Horoz		
1975	Mavi Boncuk	Baba Yaşar	
1975	Yaşar Ne Yaşar Ne Yaşamaz	Resit	
1975	Hababam Sınıfı	Kel Mahmut	
1975	Bizim Aile	Yaşar	
1975	Gülşah	Gülsah'in Dedesi	
1975	Gece Kuşu Zehra		
1975	Beş Milyoncuk Borç Verir misin	Münir Özkul	
1976	Hababam Sınıfı Sınıfta Kaldı	Mahmut Hoca 'Kel Mahmut'	
1976	Aile Şerefi	Rıza	
1976	Hababam Sınıfı Uyanıyor	Kel Mahmut	
1977	Ask dedigin laftir		
1977	Hababam Sınıfı Tatilde	Kel Mahmut	
1977	Gülen Gözler	Yaşar Usta	
1977	Cennetin Çocukları	Hasan	
1978	Hababam Sınıfı Dokuz Doğuruyor	Kel Mahmut	
1978	Happy Days	Kazım	
1979	Aşkın Gözyaşları		
1979	Erkek Güzeli Sefil Bilo	Hüso	
1980	İbişo		
1980	Deliler Almanya'da		
1980	Banker Bilo	Hasan	
1981	Gırgıriye	Emin	
1981	Deliler Koğuşu		
1982	Adile Teyze		Uncredited
1982	Gırgıriyede Şenlik Var	Emin	
1982	Bizim Sokak		
1982	Altın Kafes		
1982	Talih Kuşu	Mahmut Bey	
1982	Islak Mendil	Kadir	
1982	Görgüsüzler	Murat'in Amcasi	
1982	Buyurun Cümbüşe		
1982	Beni Unutma		
1982	Gazap Rüzgârı	Münir	
1982	Ağlayan Gülmedi mi?		
1982	Şıngırdak Şadiye		
1982	Bir Yudum Mutluluk		
1983	Singirdak sadiye		
1983	Şaşkın Ördek		
1983	İlişki	Murat'in Babasi	
1983	Gırgıriyede Cümbüş Var	Emin	
1983	Dostlar Sağolsun	Tahir Baba	
1984	Çaresizim		
1984	Gırgıriyede Büyük Seçim	Emin	
1984	Dost Yarasi	Father Münir	
1984	Şaşkın Gelin		
1984	Kızlar Sınıfı	Mahmut Hoca	
1984	Geçim Otobüsü	Nasrettin	
1985	Ya Ya Ya Şa Şa Şa		
1985	Şişeli Köy		
1985	Sarı Öküz Parası		
1985	Köşeyi Dönenler		
1985	Kösedönücü		
1985	Istanbul geceleri		
1985	Garibim Ceylan		
1985	Duyar mısın Feryadımı		
1985	Deliye Hergün Bayram	Mahmut	
1985	Çalınan Hayat		
1985	Büyük Günah		
1985	Muhabbet Kuşları		
1985	Palavracılar		
1986	Al dudaklim	Kadir	
1986	Kuzucuklarım		
1986	Kızlar Sınıfı Tatilde		
1986	Elmayı Kim Isırdı		
1986	Ekmek Parası		
1986	Efkarlıyım Abiler		
1986	Dayak Cennetten Çıkma		
1986	Babalar da Ağlar		
1986	Alın Yazımız Bu		
1986	Ana Kucağı		
1986	Küçük Ağam		
1986	Kısmetin En Güzeli		
1986	Melek Hanım'ın Fendi		
1986	Neşeye Bak Neşeye		
1986	Töre		
1987	Yıllar		
1987	Ana Kucagi		
1987	Milyarder	Mahmut	
1987	Yıkılan Yuva		
1987	Yaşamaya Mecburum		
1987	Kadersiz Kullar		
1987	Gülmece Güldürmece / Gelinciklerim		
1987	Etme Bulma	Sadi Bey	
1987	Aile Pansiyonu	Murtaza	
1987	Afife Jale		
1987	Füze Nuri		
1987	Günah		
1987	Kuşatma 2 / Şok		
1987	Otobüs Yolcuları / İhsaniye - Karasu		
1987	Püf Noktası		
1988	Arabesk		
1988	Acı Gurbet		
1988	A Ay	Cosmos	
1993	Al Dudaklım		

=== Television ===
Television
Year	Title	Role	Notes
1979	İbiş'in Rüyası	Nahit	
1984	Köşe Dönücü		
1987	Uzaylı Zekiye		2 episodes
1991	Bir Ömrün Bedeli		
1991	Varsayalım İsmail		
1993	Nasreddin Hoca		
1994	Kızlar Sınıfı		
1996	Ay, Işığında Saklıdır	Münir Baba	TV movie
1996–1997	Ana Kuzusu		
1997	Şaban ile Şirin		
2000–2002	Reyting Hamdi		
