= Süt Kardeşler =

- Directed by: Ertem Eğilmez
- Starring: Kemal Sunal; Şener Şen; Halit Akçatepe
- Release date: 1976
- Running time: 80 min
- Country: Turkey
- Language: Turkish

Süt Kardeşler is a 1976 Turkish comedy film directed by Ertem Eğilmez.

== Cast ==
- Kemal Sunal – Şaban
- Şener Şen – Hüsamettin
- Halit Akçatepe – Ramazan
- Hale Soygazi – Bihter
- Adile Naşit – Melek
- Ayşen Gruda – Emine
- Ali Şen – Kerami
- Yasemin Esmergül – Yasemin
