= Metin Akpınar =

Turkish actor (born 1941)

- Born: 2 November 1941 (age 84); Aksaray, Fatih, Istanbul, Turkey
- Occupation: Actor
- Spouse: Göksel Özdoğdu (m. 1961, divorced)
- Children: 2

Metin Akpınar (born 2 November 1941) is a Turkish actor. He has been one of the most successful comedians in Turkey.

== Biography ==
He was born in Aksaray, Istanbul, and he graduated from Pertevniyal High School. He pursued his university career in Faculty of Law and Literature at Istanbul.

His professional career started in 1964 in Ulvi Uraz theater with the play "Gözlerimi Kaparım Vazifemi Yaparım". In 1967, he co-founded Devekuşu Kabare Tiyatrosu, the first cabaret theater of Turkey, in 1967, and has been the administrative director since.

In most of his films he starred with Zeki Alasya, often playing the more shrewd one of the duo.

In 1998, the Turkish Government awarded the title "Devlet Sanatçısı" (literally "State Artist" or "National Artist") to Metin Akpınar.

He is married to Göksel Özdoğdu.

== Awards ==
- 2008 İsmail Dümbüllü Awards "Lifetime Honorary Award"
- 47th International Antalya Golden Orange Film Festival Honorary Award
- 30th International Istanbul Film Festival Cinema Honorary Awards

== Filmography ==
- Aşk Laftan Anlamaz (Haşmet Dede) 2016
- Aşkın Halleri 2012
- Papatyam (Necati) 2009-2011
- Eve Giden Yol 1914 (Reşat Ağa) 2006
- Kısık Ateşte 15 Dakika (Resul) 2006
- Amerikalılar Karadeniz'de 2 (Muhtar Salih) 2006
- Döngel Karhanesi (Bertan) 2005
- Çat Kapı (Hüsnü) 2005
- Eğreti Gelin (Tavid) 2004
- Lorkestra 2002
- Rus Gelin (Damat Adayı) 2002
- Güler Misin Ağlar Mısın 2000
- Abuzer Kadayıf (Abuzer Kadayıf/Ersin Balkan) 2000
- Baykuşların Saltanatı 2000
- Güle Güle (Galip) 1999
- Propaganda (Rahim) 1999
- Yerim Seni 1997
- Hastane (Hastabakıcı Hakkı Baharbahçe) 1993
- Biz Bize Benzeriz 1992
- Namus Düşmanı (Ali) 1986
- Patron Duymasın 1985
- Yanlış Numara (Erol) 1985
- Davetsiz Misafir (Rüstem/Halim) 1983
- Dönme Dolap 1983
- Baş Belası (Metin) 1982
- Şaka Yapma 1981
- Vah Başımıza Gelenler 1979
- Köşe Kapmaca (Halis) 1979
- Petrol Kralları (Metin) 1978
- Cafer'in Çilesi (Refik) 1978
- Sivri Akıllılar 1977
- Aslan Bacanak (Halim) 1977
- Hasip İle Nasip 1976
- Her Gönülde Bir Aslan Yatar (Danyal) 1976
- Nereye Bakıyor Bu Adamlar (Metin) 1976
- Güler Misin Ağlar Mısın (Metin) 1975
- Nereden Çıktı Bu Velet (Metin) 1975
- Beş Milyoncuk Borç Verir Misin (Metin) 1975
- Hasret 1974
- Mirasyediler (Metin) 1974
- Mavi Boncuk (Süleyman) 1974
- Köyden İndim Şehire (Hayret) 1974
- Salak Milyoner (Hayret) 1974
- Oh Olsun (Doktor Metin) 1973
- Canım Kardeşim 1973
- Yalancı Yarim (Mahmut) 1973
- Tatlı Dillim (Metin) 1972
