= Zeki Alasya =

Turkish actor and film director

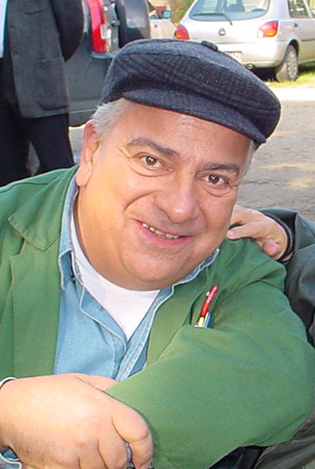
- Born: 18 April 1943; Istanbul, Turkey
- Died: 8 May 2015 (aged 72); Istanbul, Turkey
- Occupations: Actor, film director
- Years active: 1959–2015
- Spouse(s): Oya Alasya (m. 1969; div. 1987) Jülide Adak Alasya (m. 2008)
- Partner(s): Sema Yunak (1988–2003)
- Children: 1

Zeki Alasya (18 April 1943 – 8 May 2015) was a Turkish actor and film director. Alasya was of Turkish Cypriot descent and was related to Kıbrıslı Mehmed Kamil Pasha.

== Biography ==
Alasya was born in Istanbul to a Turkish Cypriot family. After studying at Robert College, he joined MTTB Theatre as an amateur actor. For a short time, he worked at Arena, Gen-Ar and Ulvi Uraz Theatre. With some friends, he founded the Devekuşu Kabare Theatre (Ostrich Cabaret Theatre).

From 1973, he started acting in films and gained fame as a comedian paired with Metin Akpınar like Salak Milyoner, Beş Milyoncuk Borç Verir misin, Köyden İndim Şehire, Güler misin Ağlar mısın, Nerden Çıktı Bu Velet, Nereye Bakıyor Bu Adamlar, Hasip ile Nasip and Güle Güle. In 1977, he also took up directing and went on to direct films such as Aslan Bacanak, Sivri Akıllılar, Caferin Çilesi, Petrol Kralları, Doktor, Köşe Kapmaca, Vay Başımıza Gelenler and Elveda Dostum.

== Death ==
Alasya died on 8 May 2015 at a hospital, where he had been receiving treatment for liver disease. He was 72. He was laid to rest in Zincirlikuyu Cemetery following the religious funeral service held at Levent Mosque.

== Filmography ==
Filmography
| Year | Title | Role | Notes |
|---|---|---|---|
| 1972 | Karaoğlan Geliyor | Çalık | |
| 1972 | Sev Kardeşim | Avukat | |
| 1972 | Tarkan Altın Madalyon | Vandal Kralı | |
| 1972 | Tatlı Dillim | Antrenör | |
| 1973 | Hamsi Nuri | Torik | |
| 1973 | Kaynanam Kudurdu | | |
| 1973 | Yalancı Yarim | Hüsnü | |
| 1973 | Beş Tavuk Bir Horoz | Vehbi Bey | |
| 1974 | Köyden İndim Şehire | Himmet Ağa | |
| 1974 | Mavi Boncuk | Şeker Kamil | |
| 1974 | Mirasyediler | Zeki | |
| 1974 | Salak Milyoner | Himmet Ağa | |
| 1974 | İmparator | İspirto Nuri | |
| 1974 | Şenlik Var / Bal Kız | Selim | |
| 1975 | Beş Milyoncuk Borç Verir Misin | Zeki | |
| 1975 | Güler Misin Ağlar Mısın | Zeki | |
| 1975 | Nereden Çıktı Bu Velet | Zeki | |
| 1976 | Hasip ile Nasip | Hasip | |
| 1976 | Her Gönülde Bir Aslan Yatar | Bekçi Zeynel | |
| 1976 | Nereye Bakıyor Bu Adamlar | Zeki | |
| 1977 | Aslan Bacanak | Selim | |
| 1977 | Sivri Akıllılar | Zeki | |
| 1978 | Cafer'in Çilesi | Cafer | |
| 1978 | Petrol Kralları | Zeki | |
| 1979 | Doktor | Tabelacı | |
| 1979 | Garibin Çilesi Ölünce Biter | Zeki | |
| 1979 | Köşe Kapmaca | Donanma Kamil | |
| 1979 | Vay Başımıza Gelenler | Kamil | |
| 1981 | Şaka Yapma | Zeki | |
| 1982 | Baş Belası | Zeki Gürses | |
| 1983 | Davetsiz Misafir | İlyas | |
| 1983 | Dönme Dolap | Selami | |
| 1984 | Gülümseyen Dünya | | |
| 1985 | Yanlış Numara | Sami | |
| 1985 | Patron Duymasın | Şakir | |
| 1986 | Namus Düşmanı | Veli | |
| 1988 | Güler Misin Ağlar Mısın | Zeki | TV series |
| 1992 | Biz Bize Benzeriz | | |
| 1992 | Zeki Metince | | |
| 1993 | Hastane | Doktor Salih Marmara | TV series |
| 1997 | Yerim Seni | Muharrem | TV series |
| 1999 | Güle Güle | İsmet | |
| 2000 | Adada Bir Sonbahar | Mehmet | TV movie |
| 2000 | Oyunbozan | Kemal Yılmaz | |
| 2001 | Dedem, Gofret ve Ben | Rıza | |
| 2002 | Anne Babamla Evlensene | Sermet | |
| 2002 | Rus Gelin | Federasyon Başkanı Mithat | |
| 2003 | Hababam Sınıfı Merhaba | Boz Ali | |
| 2003 | Ömerçip | Tonton Dede | |
| 2004 | Cennet Mahallesi | Komiser Cemil | TV series, 2004-2007 |
| 2004 | Cumhurbaşkanı Öteki Türkiye'de | Cumhurbaşkanı | |
| 2004 | Kalbin Zamanı | Fikret | |
| 2004 | Pardon | Cezaevi Müdürü | |
| 2004 | Yabancı Damat | Ökkeş Usta | TV series |
| 2004 | Şans Kapıyı Kırınca | Peder Alfonzo | |
| 2006 | Can | | |
| 2007 | Hayattan Korkma | Rıfkı | |
| 2007 | Oyun Bitti | Tahsin | TV series |
| 2008 | Akasya Durağı | Nuri Baba | TV series, 2008-2012 yılları arasında yayınlanmış televizyon dizisi |
| 2008 | Görgüsüzler | Nurullah | TV series |
| 2009 | Aşk Geliyorum Demez | İsmail | |
| 2013 | Bizim Okul | Gestapo Ayfer | TV series |
| 2013 | Arka Sokaklar | Vasıf Koç | TV series, guest star |
| 2014-2015 | Küçük Ağa | Mehmet Ağa | TV series |
