= Halit Akçatepe =

Turkish actor (1937–2017)

Halit Cavit Akçatepe
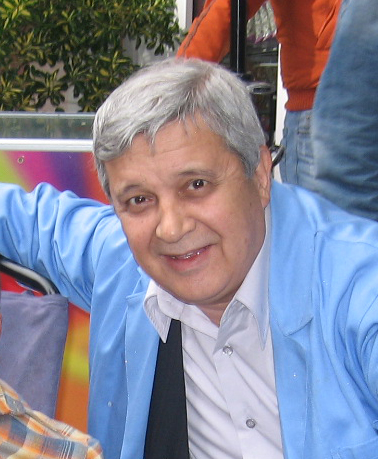
- Born: 1 January 1938; Üsküdar, Istanbul, Turkey
- Died: 31 March 2017 (aged 79); Istanbul, Turkey
- Resting place: Karacaahmet Cemetery
- Occupation: Actor
- Years active: 1940–2010
- Spouses: Tülin Akçatepe (m. 1963; div. 1981) Rezzan Akçatepe (m. 1999; div. 2009)
- Children: 3
- Parent(s): Sıtkı Akçatepe; Leman Akçatepe

Halit Cavit Akçatepe (1 January 1937 – 31 March 2017) was a Turkish actor.

== Life and career ==
Akçatepe was born in Üsküdar in 1938, the son of actor Sıtkı Akçatepe and actress Leman Akçatepe. His father is descendant of Nevşehirli Damat Ibrahim Pasha and Fatma Sultan (daughter of Ahmed III). In 1943, he made his debut in the film Dertli Pınar at the age of 5 and made more appearances in other films in some child roles. Akçatepe completed his studies in Saint Benoit French High School. In 1956 he joined the army and stayed there for 1,5 years before returning to acting. He played supporting roles in many classic films.

In 1975, he acted in Hababam Sınıfı and then later its sequels Hababam Sınıfı Sınıfta Kaldı, Hababam Sınıfı Uyanıyor, Hababam Sınıfı Yeniden, Hababam Sınıfı Askerde, Hababam Sınıfı Üç Buçuk.

He had leading role in classic comedy films Süt Kardeşler, Yaşar Ne Yaşar Ne Yaşamaz, Salak Milyoner, Şaban Oğlu Şaban, Köyden İndim Şehre, Bizim Aile, Ah Nerede and classic drama Üç Arkadaş, Canım Kardeşim.

He died of a heart attack caused by respiratory failure in 2017.

== Filmography ==
=== Actor Film ===
1943	Dertli Pınar
1943	Nasreddin Hoca Düğün'de
1944	Günahsızlar
1945	Köroğlu
1946	Senede Bir Gün
1947	Bir Dağ Masalı
1947	Karanlık Yollar
1948	İstiklal Madalyası
1949	Fato Ya Istiklal Ya Ölüm
1950	Çete
1951	Güldağlı Cemile
1951	Hayat Acıları
1952	Drakula istanbul'da
1953	Köprüaltı Çocukları
1953	Mahallenin Namusu
1966	Karaoğlan - ( Camoka'nın İntikamı )
1971	Beyoğlu Güzeli
1971	Bir Varmış Bir Yokmuş
1971	Üç Arkadaş
1972	Adanalı Kardeşler
1972	Feryat
1972	İyi Döverim Kötü Severim
1972	O Ağacın Altında
1972	Sev Kardeşim
1972	Tarkan: Altın Madalyon
1972	Tatlı Dillim
1972	Üç Sevgili
1972	Aşk Sepeti
1973	Bebek Yüzlü
1973	Canım Kardeşim
1973	Oh Olsun
1973	Ömer Hayyam
1973	Sevilmek İstiyorum
1973	Tarkan: Güçlü Kahraman
1973	Umut Dünyası
1973	Yalancı Yarim
1974	Evet mi Hayır mı?
1974	Hababam Sınıfı
1974	Kanlı Deniz
1974	Köyden İndim Şehire
1974	Mavi Boncuk
1974	Salak Milyoner
1974	Şaşkın
1974	Yaşar Ne Yaşar Ne Yaşamaz
1975	Ah Nerede
1975	Bizim Aile
1975	Hababam Sınıfı Sınıfta Kaldı
1975	Merhaba
1975	İki Tatlı Serseri
1975	Üç Ahbap Çavuşlar
1976	Bülbül Ailesi
1976	Hababam Sınıfı Uyanıyor
1976	Lüküs Hayat
1976	Şoför Mehmet
1976	Süt Kardeşler
1976	Tantana Kardeşler
1977	Gülen Gözler
1977	Şabanoğlu Şaban
1978	Evlidir Ne Yapsa Yeridir
1979	Dokunmayın Şabanıma
1980	Renkli Dünyalar
1981	Dört Geline Dört Damat
1982	Adile Teyze
1982	Buyurun Cümbüşe
1982	Talih Kuşu
1982	Umut Dilencisi
1985	Keriz
1985	Şaban Pabucu Yarım
1985	Şendul Şaban
1986	Keko Aptallar Çetesi
1986	Gurbet Sancısı
1986	Duvardaki Kan
1986	Himmet Ağa'nın İzdivacı
1987	Büyük Koşu
1987	Karımın Gölgesi
1987	Kötü Kader
1988	Serçeler Göç Etmez
1989	Bizimkiler
1989	İnsanlar Yaşadıkça
1990	Yalnız Değilsiniz
1991	Portatif Hüseyin
1992	Anasının Kızı
1992	Sürgün
1993	Hayri Beyin Son Aşkı
1993	Oyun İçinde Oyun
1993	Şaban Askerde
1993	Yazlıkçılar
1994	Kaygısızlar
1995	Şaban ile Şirin
1995	Şark Kahvesi
1995	Çatı
1996	Hoşçakal İstanbu
1997	Hayvanlara Dokunduk
1997	Kılıbık Mahallesi
1998	Eltiler
1999	Konu Komşu
2000	Siyah Cennet
2000	Tersine Dünya
2000	Tophaneli Osman
2001	Çılgın Bediş
2001	Pembe Panjurlu Ev
2002	En Son Babalar Duyar
2002	Vaka-i Zaptiye
2003	Hababam Sınıfı Merhaba
2003	Şapkadan Babam Çıktı
2003	Yeşilçam Denizi
2004	Avrupa Yakası
2004	Büyük Buluşma
2004	Canım Annem
2004	Hababam Sınıfı Askerde
2005	Beşinci Boyut
2005	Cumbadan Rumpaya
2005	Hababam Sınıfı Üç Buçuk
2005	İki Arada Aşk
2005	Mühim Olan Aşkımız
2006	Sevda Çiçeği
2007	Genco
2007	Hakkını Helal Et
2007	Sesler Yüzler Mekanlar
2007	Yalan Dünya
2008	İki Aile
2008	Vurgun
2009	7 Kocalı Hürmüz
2009	Aile Reisi
2009	Orada Neler Oluyor?
2011	Geniş Aile
2011	Leyla ile Mecnun
2012	Kral Çıplak
2012	Krem
2013	Babam Sınıfta Kaldı
2015	Karaman'ın Koyunu
