= İhsan Yüce =

Turkish actor and occasionally, scenarist and director

- Born: 23 January 1929; Elazığ, Turkey
- Died: 15 May 1991 (aged 62); Istanbul, Turkey
- Education: İzmir Atatürk Lisesi
- Occupations: Actor, screenwriter, director
- Years active: 1952–1990

İhsan Yüce (23 January 1929 – 15 May 1991) was a Turkish actor and occasionally, scenarist and director.

Yüce studied at İzmir Atatürk High School and later at the İktisadi ve Ticari İlimler Akademisi. He began his acting career in İzmir and founded the Bizim Tiyatro and Drama Tiyatrosu.

His first prominent film role was in Altın Yumruk and he established himself with films such as Senede Bir Gün, Bir Millet Uyanıyor ve Sürtüğün Kızı. He was awarded the Golden Orange for Best Actor for his performance in Derya Gülü.

All together, Yüce acted in a total of 117 films, wrote the screenplay for 55 films and directed 6 films.
