= Şener Şen =

Turkish actor (born 1941)

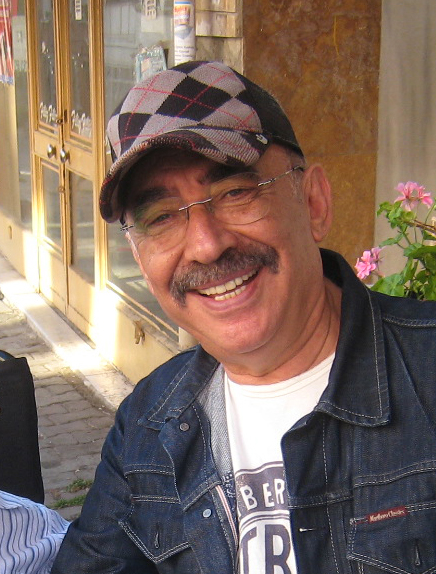
- Born: 26 December 1941 (age 84); Adana, Turkey
- Occupation: Actor
- Spouse: Şermin Hürmeriç (1989–1997; divorced)
- Children: 1
- Father: Ali Şen

Şener Şen (born 26 December 1941) is a Turkish film and theatre actor who has won the Golden Orange for Best Actor twice for his roles in Muhsin Bey (1985) and Gönül Yarası (2005), the Golden Orange for Best Supporting Actor for Çöpçüler Kralı (1977) and a Golden Orange Lifetime Achievement Award. A prominent actor of classic films in the Turkish cinema, he has played a wide range of iconic characters in various genres, including drama, comedy. He received the distinction of "Turkish state artist" in 1998.

== Biography ==
Şener Şen is the son of actor Ali Şen and the brother of actress İnci Şen. Şener Şen began acting in 1958 at the age of 17 as an amateur at the Yeşil Sahne Theater in Cağaloğlu. From 1964 to 1966 he taught in elementary schools in the villages of eastern Anatolia. In 1966 he returned to the stage at the City Theater in Istanbul. He made his film debut with a small role in the drama film So-Called Girls (1967), directed by Nejat Saydam.

He was the one of ensemble cast in classic comedy films Hababam Sınıfı, Tosun Paşa, Gülen Gözler, Süt Kardeşler, Şabanoğlu Şaban, Neşeli Günler, Bizim Aile.

Since 1980s, he continued as lead role in more than thirty films.

For his role as Nazım in Yavuz Turgul's movie Gönül Yarası (2005), he won the "Best Actor" award at the 42nd International Antalya Golden Orange Film Festival. His roles in the movies Kabadayı (2007) and Av Mevsimi (2010) in which he shared the leading role with Çetin Tekindor and Cem Yılmaz are among his latest works. In 2015, Şen appeared in a commercial for Aygaz.

On 28 December 2016, at the Presidential Culture and Arts Grand Prize ceremony, he received an award from President Recep Tayyip Erdoğan after which he said: "Stories tell us how we can live life. I have carefully selected the characters I've portrayed to serve the good and right. I believed that societies looking for good, right and beauty will always live in peace. I accept this award with the hope of contributing to our social peace."

Şen is the father of one daughter, Bengü Şen (b. 1974) from his first marriage.

== Filmography ==
Film appearances
Year	Title	Role	Notes
1964	Hizmetçi Dediğin Böyle Olur		Şener Şen's film debut.
1967	So-Called Girls (Turkish: Sözde Kızlar)		
1971	Görünce Kurşunlayın		
1971	Altın Prens Devler Ülkesinde		
1972	Katerina 72		
1972	Zorbanın Aşkı		
1972	Dinmeyen Sızı		
1973	Aşk Mahkumu		
1973	Bitirimler Sosyetede	Garson	
1973	Bir Demet Menekşe		
1974	Yaşar Ne Yaşar Ne Yaşamaz		
1974	Ayrı Dünyalar		
1975	Bak Yeşil Yeşil	Ahmet	
1975	Bizim Aile	Şener	
1975	Hababam Sınıfı Sınıfta Kaldı	Body Ekrem	
1975	Aptal Şampiyon	Fong	
1976	Hababam Sınıfı Uyanıyor	Body Ekrem	
1976	Tosun Paşa	Lütfü	
1976	Süt Kardeşler	Kumandan Hüsamettin	
1977	Hababam Sınıfı Tatilde	Body Ekrem	
1977	Şabanoğlu Şaban	Kumandan Hüsamettin	
1977	Çöpçüler Kralı	Zabıta Amiri	Won the Golden Orange for Best Supporting Actor.
1977	Smiling Eyes (Turkish: Gülen Gözler)	Vecihi	
1978	Kibar Feyzo	Maho Ağa	
1978	Sultan	Bakkal Bahtiyar	
1978	Hababam Sınıfı Dokuz Doğuruyor	Body Ekrem	
1978	Neşeli Günler	Ziya	
1979	Erkek Güzeli Sefil Bilo	Maho Ağa	
1979	N'olacak Şimdi	Şakir	
1980	Banker Bilo	Banker Maho	
1981	Gırgıriyede Şenlik Var		
1981	Davaro	Sülo	
1982	Adile Teyze	Sadık	
1982	Çiçek Abbas	Şakir	
1982	Dolap Beygiri	Banker Yakup	
1983	Gırgıriyede Cümbüş Var	Duman Haydar	
1983	Şekerpare	Ziver	
1983	The Shalvar Trouser Trial (Turkish: Şalvar Davası)	Ağa	First lead role.
1984	Gırgıriyede Büyük Seçim		
1984	High Principled (Turkish: Namuslu)	Ali Rıza	
1985	Züğürt Ağa	Ağa	
1985	Aşık Oldum	Şakir	
1985	Çıplak Vatandaş	İbrahim	
1986	Milyarder	Mesut	
1986	Değirmen	Kaymakam Hilmi	
1987	Mr. Muhsin (Turkish: Muhsin Bey)	Muhsin Bey	Won the Golden Orange for Best Actor.
1987	Selamsız Bandosu	Latif Şahin	
1987	Zengin Mutfağı	Lütfü Usta	
1987	Arabesk	Şener	
1990	Aşk Filmlerinin Unutulmaz Yönetmeni	Haşmet Asilkan	
1992	Gölge Oyunu	Abidin	
1993	Amerikalı	Şeref The Türk	
1996	The Bandit (Turkish: Eşkıya)	Baran	Also executive producer.
2000	İkinci Bahar (TV series)	Ali Haydar	
2004	Lovelorn (Turkish: Gönül Yarası)	Nazım	Won the Golden Orange for Best Actor.
2007	For Love and Honor (Turkish: Kabadayı)	Ali Osman	
2010	Hunting Season (Turkish: Av Mevsimi)	Avcı	
2017	Fork in the Road (Turkish: Yol Ayrimi)	Mazhar	

=== TV shows ===
- İkinci Bahar

== Awards ==
- 1978 15. Antalya Film Festivali (15th Antalya Film Festival), Çöpçüler Kralı, Best Supporting Actor
- 1987 24. Antalya Film Festivali (15th Antalya Film Festival), Muhsin Bey, Best Actor
- 1997 Valencia Film Festival, Eşkiya, Best Actor
- 2005 42. Antalya Film Festivali (15th Antalya Film Festival), Gönül Yarası, Best Actor
- 2016 Cumhurbaşkanlığı Kültür ve Sanat Büyük Ödülleri (Presidential Culture and Arts Grand Awards)
