= Ertem Eğilmez =

Turkish film director and producer (1929–1989)

- Born: February 18, 1929; Trabzon, Turkey
- Died: 21 September 1989 (aged 60); Istanbul, Turkey
- Citizenship: Turkish
- Occupations: Film director, producer and screenwriter
- Years active: from 1964

Ertem Eğilmez (18 February 1929 – 21 September 1989) was a Turkish film director, producer and screenwriter. He is known as the name behind some of the most popular films in Turkish film history. Many of these were produced by his production company Arzu Film.

== Selected filmography ==
=== Director ===
- Fatoş'un Fendi Tayfur'u Yendi (1964)
- Senede Bir Gün (1965)
- Sürtük (1965)
- Helal Adanalı Celal (1965)
- Kart Horoz (1965)
- Seni Bekleyeceğim (1966)
- Seni Seviyorum (1966)
- Ben Bir Sokak Kadınıyım (1966)
- Bir Millet Uyanıyor (1966)
- Ömre Bedel Kız (1967)
- Yaşlı Gözler (1967)
- Ölünceye Kadar (1967)
- Sürtüğün Kızı (1967)
- İngiliz Kemal (1968)
- Sevemez Kimse Seni (1968)
- Nilgün (1968)
- Boş Çerçeve (1969)
- Kalbimin Efendisi (1970)
- Küçük Hanımefendi (1970)
- Sürtük (1970)
- Senede Bir Gün (1971)
- Beyoğlu Güzeli (1971)
- Tatlı Dillim (1972)
- Sev Kardeşim (1972)
- My Dear Brother (1973)
- Yalancı Yarım (1973)
- Mavi Boncuk (1974)
- From the Village to the City (1974)
- Hababam Sinifi (1975)
- Süt Kardeşler (1976)
- Gülen Gözler (1977)
- Şaban Oğlu Şaban (1977)
- Hababam Sınıfı Tatilde (1977)
- Banker Bilo (1980)
- Namuslu (1984)
- Arabesk (1988)

=== Producer ===
- The King of the Street Cleaners (1977)
- Tosun Paşa (1976)
- Ölmeyen ask (1966)
- Senede bir gün (1966)
- Allahaismarladik yavrum (1966)
- Ben bir sokak kadiniyim (1966)
- Denizciler geliyor (1966)
- Seni bekleyecegim (1966)
- Seni seviyorum (1966)
- Sürtük (1965)
- Taçsiz kral (1965)
- Bilen kazaniyor (1965)
- Helal adanali celal (1965)
- Gözleri ömre bedel (1964)
- Fatos'un fendi Tayfur'u yendi (1964)
- Kirk küçük anne (1964)
- Iki gemi yan yana (1963)
- Batti Balik (1962)
- Bes kardestiler (1962)
- Gençlik hülyalari (1962)
- Yaman gazeteci (1961)
