= Müfit Kayacan =

Turkish actor and theatre director (born 1959)

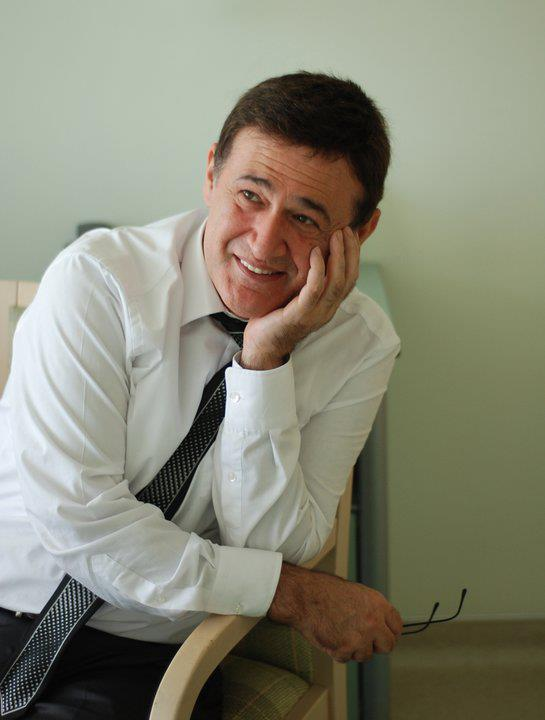
- Born: 17 January 1959 (age 67); Kaş, Antalya, Turkey
- Occupations: Actor, theatre director
- Years active: 1983–present
- Children: 2

Müfit Kayacan (born 17 January 1959) is a Turkish actor and theatre director.

== Life and career ==
Kayacan was born on 17 January 1959 in Kaş, Turkey. He is a graduate of Adana Çukurova University with a degree in industrial engineering. He is one of the founders of Antalya Metropolitan Municipality City Theaters (AŞT), where he played his first role in 1983, and was the general art director for 25 years. During this period, he took part in 32 different plays and directed 25 plays. At the same time, he worked as the Head of Cultural Services Department in Antalya Metropolitan Municipality for 10 years. The National Theater Festival for High Schools, one of the many festivals initiated during his duty, started in 1993 for the first time with the participation of 6 high schools. Kayacan, who was also a jury member at the Golden Orange Film Festival, is also one of the creators of the Likya Seyirlik Games Festival. Kayacan is also one of the executives of Women Meet with Theater project. He has also appeared in numerous TV series and movies.

Kayacan is married with two children. In 2012, he was nominated for the "Best Actor in a Musical or Comedy" award at the 16th Afife Theatre Awards for his role as "Abdi" in Kanlı Nigâr, which he took to stage at Adım Theatre and also starred in.

== Filmography ==
=== Film ===
Year	Title	Role
2007	Çılgın Dersane	Lawyer
2008	Çılgın Dersane Kampta	Lawyer
2015	Olur İnşallah	Muhtar
2015	Abluka	Hamza
2016	Kırık Kalpler Bankası	Fethiyeli
2017	Yol Kenarı	İmam
2016	Albüm	Cemal
2017	Körfez	Bülent
2018	Hit Me Baby (short)	
2018	Anons	Hayati
2018	Son Çıkış	Berber
2019	Kız Kardeşler	Şevket
2019	Aykut Enişte	Sadi
2019	Görülmüştür	Adnan
2019	Küçük Şeyler	Hikmet
2019	Cinayet Süsü	Peasant Man
2020	Bir Nefes Daha	Serhad
2020	Bayi Toplantısı	Nuri
2020	Biz Böyleyiz	Haluk
2021	Aykut Enişte 2	Sadi
2023	Özür Dilerim	Hicabi Avkıran

=== Television ===
Year	Title	Role
2003	Şıh Senem	
2005	Kezban Yenge	Simetri
2006	Maçolar	İkdam
2010	Öyle Bir Geçer Zaman ki	School principal
2012	Şubat	
2015	Aşk Yeniden	
2016	Eşkıya Dünyaya Hükümdar Olmaz	Feridun
2016	Cesur ve Güzel	Rıfat
2017	Tutsak	
2018	Adı: Zehra	Bayram
2018	Bartu Ben	Dayı
2019	Yüzleşme	Selim
2019	Aşk Ağlatır	Yıldırım Özben
2020	Zemheri	Yaşar
2020	Alef	Arap
2020	Aşk 101	Necdet
2020	Aile Şirketi	Şenol Kurt
2021	Çukur	Cumali Koçovalı / Halil İbrahim
2021–2022	Kaderimin Oyunu	Harun Demirhan
2022	Bir Peri Masalı	Hamit Köksal
2023	Safir	Ömer Gülsoy
2024	Uzak Şehir	Ecmel Albora

== Theatre ==
=== As actor ===
- Ormanın Bekçileri (1983) / writer: Ülker Köksal
- Küçük Nasreddin (1984) / writer: Serpil Akıllıoğlu
- Rumuz Goncagül (1984) / writer: Oktay Arayıcı
- Becerikli Kanguru (1985) / writer: Ahmet Önel
- Topuzlu (1985) / writer: Hidayet Sayın
- Köşe Kapmaca (1986) / writer: Hidayet Sayın
- Kırmızı Sokağın Suzanı (1987) / writer: Erdoğan Aytekin
- Keşanlı Ali Destanı (1988) / writer: Haldun Taner
- Gözlerimi Kaparım Vazifemi Yaparım (1989) / writer: Haldun Taner
- Ay Işığında Şamata (1990) / writer: Haldun Taner
- Canlar Ölesi Değil (1990) / writer: Haldun Taner
- Sayım Suyum Yok (1990) / writer: Ahmet Önel
- Fehim Paşa Konağı (1991) / writer: Turgut Özakman
- Kanlı Nigar (1992) / writer: Sadık Şendil
- Nalınlar (1993) / writer: Necati Cumali
- Öykülerin Azizliği (1995) / writer: M. Taner Çelik
- Köşe Kapmaca (1996) / writer: Hidayet Sayın
- Düğün Ya Da Davul (1997) / writer: Haşmet Zeybek
- Aşk Grevi (1998) / writer: Savaş Aykılıç
- Politikada Bir Sarı Çizmeli (1999) / writer: Recep Bilginer
- Cimri (2000) / writer: Moliere
- Yobaz (2001) / writer: Metin Balay
- Töre (2002) / writer: Turgut Özakman
- Rumuz Goncagül (2002) / writer: Oktay Arayıcı
- Komşu Köyün Delisi (2003) / writer: Üstün Dökmen
- Definename (2004) / writer: Sinan Bayraktar
- Vatan Kurtaran Şaban (2009) / writer: Haldun Taner
- Fehim Paşa Konağı (2010) / writer: Turgut Özakman
- İnadına Yaşamak (2011) / writer: Metin Balay
- Heccav Yahut Şair Eşref'in Esrarengiz Macerası (2012) / writer: Semih Çelenk
- Carmela y Paolino (2013) / writer: Jose Sanchis Sinisterre
- Azizname (2014) / writer: M. Taner Çelik
- Entrikalı Dolap Komedyası (2016)
- Bu da Geçer Yahu (2018)

=== As director ===
- Becerikli Kanguru (1985) / writer: Ahmet Önel
- Kırmızı Sokağın Suzanı (1987) / writer: Erdoğan Aytekin
- Keşanlı Ali Destanı (1988) / writer: Haldun Taner
- Gözlerimi Kaparım Vazifemi Yaparım (1989) / writer: Haldun Taner
- Ay Işığında Şamata (1990) / writer: Haldun Taner
- Canlar Ölesi Değil (1990) / writer: Haldun Taner
- Sayım Suyum Yok (1990) / writer: Ahmet Önel
- Fehim Paşa Konağı (1991) / writer: Turgut Özakman
- Kanlı Nigar (1992) / writer: Sadık Şendil
- Nalınlar (1993) / writer: Necati Cumalı
- Politikada Bir Sarı Çizmeli (1999) / writer: Recep Bilginer
- Töre (2002) / writer: Turgut Özakman
- Aşk Grevi (2010) / writer: Savaş Aykılıç

== Awards and nominations ==
- 16th Afife Theatre Awards - "Best Actor in a Musical or Comedy" (nom) - Kanlı Nigar (2012)
- Direct Audience Awards - "Best Actor" - Vatan Kurtaran Şaban (2009, Antalya BB City Theatre)
- Golden Mask Theatre Awards Mersin - "Best Director" - Keşanlı Ali Destanı (1989, Antalya BB City Theatre)
