= Melahat =

Melahat is a Turkish feminine given name. Notable persons with that name include:

- Melahat Eryurt (born 1975), Turkish footballer
- Melahat Gürsel (1900–1975), fourth First Lady of Turkey
- Melahat Okuyan (1924–2025), Turkish bacteriologist and virologist
- Melahat Ruacan (1906–1974), Turkish high court judge
