= Arif Erkin Güzelbeyoğlu =

Turkish actor and musician (1935–2025)

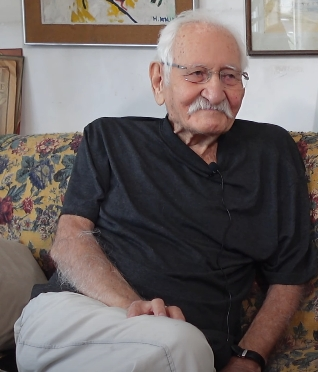
- Born: 11 September 1935; Gaziantep, Turkey
- Died: 16 October 2025 (aged 90); Istanbul, Turkey
- Education: ITU School of Architecture
- Years active: 1965–2025

Arif Erkin Güzelbeyoğlu (11 September 1935 – 16 October 2025) was a Turkish actor and musician.

== Life and career ==
Güzelbeyoğlu was born on 11 September 1935. He started his acting career by acting in Keşanlı Ali Destanı in 1970. He is best known with the character of Mala Ahmet in the film The White Angel. Güzelbeyoğlu died on 16 October 2025, at the age of 90.

== Filmography ==
- Güven Bana (2023)
- Menajerimi Ara (Kendisi) (2020)
- Güvercin (2019–2020)
- Çici Babam (Abdukadir'in Dedesi) (2018)
- Vezir Parmağı (Köyün Dedesi) (2017)
- Aile Arasında (Dede) (2017)
- Bütün Saadetler Mümkündür (2017)
- Çoban Yıldızı (2017)
- Aşk Yalanı Sever (2016)
- Güzel Köylü (Rifat) (2014–2015)
- Kadim Dostum (2014)
- Doksanlar (2013–2014)
- Benimle Oynar mısın (Şeref Baba) (2013)
- Old Clock (2012)
- Muhteşem Yüzyıl (Piri Mehmet Paşa) (2011–2014)
- Hayat Devam Ediyor (İbrahim Bakırcı) (2011–2013)
- Canım Ailem (Cabbar Ağa) (2009–2010)
- Gecenin Kanatları (Hasan) (2009)
- Tatlı Bela Fadime (Temel Dede) (2008)
- Arka Sokaklar (2008)
- Kalpsiz Adam (Ekrem) (2008)
- Kara Yılan (Mamo Ağa) (2007)
- Beyaz Melek (2007)
- Yabancı Damat (Memik Dede) (2004–2007)
- Halk Düşmanı (2004)
- Sultan Makamı (2003)
- Yeditepe İstanbul (Hüseyin) (2001–2002)
- İkinci Bahar (Zülfikar Ağa) (1998–2001)
- Yazlıkçılar (Cavit) (1993–1998)
- Bir Milyara Bir Çocuk (1990)
- Bizimkiler (Katil Yavuz'un Ağabeyi) (1989–1991)
- Kesanlı Ali Destanı (1988)
