= Lyonel Makzume =

Turkish businessman of Christian Arab descent

Lyonel A. Makzume
- Born: 1923; İskenderun, Turkey
- Died: 1995 (aged 71–72)
- Occupation: Businessman
- Known for: Wealthy businessman who was one of Turkey's top taxpayers
- Spouse: İstiklal Makzume
- Family: Jehan Barbur (granddaughter)

Lyonel Makzume (1923 - 1995) was a Turkish businessman of Christian Arab descent and one of the country's top taxpayers.

== Career ==
In 1944, Makzume founded the Lyonel A. Makzume shipping agency with almost no capital, in Iskenderun, Turkey. His business rapidly grew, so that in 1983, he surpassed Şarık Tara and Vehbi Koç to become Turkey's highest individual taxpayer. Throughout the 1980s, he consistently ranked among the top ten taxpayers.

== Philanthropy ==
Makzume established İstiklal Makzume Anatolian High School in honor of his late wife, İstiklal Makzume. The school was funded through the İstiklal Makzume Foundation that he created.

== Personal life ==
Makzume spoke six languages—Turkish, Arabic, English, Italian, Spanish and German—and considered this ability a major factor in his business success. He was the grandfather of singer Jehan Barbur, who has described him as a significant influence on her worldview. Makzume died in 1995, when he was 72 years old.
