= İkinci Bahar (play) =

Play

- Original language: Spanish
- Genre: Comedy

Premiere
- Place: Turkey

İkinci Bahar (English: Second Spring) is a theater play adapted into Turkish from the work of Alfonso Paso. The play, which premiered in 2018, featured Cihat Tamer and Bedia Ener in the cast. In the following years some of the cast were replaced by newly joined actors such as Suzan Aksoy, Kerem Poyraz Kayaalp, and Selin Köseoğlu.

== The subject of the play ==
The play deals with two generations, the younger generation and the older generation, that are in opposition in certain aspects.
