= A Bandit Cannot Rule the World =

- Also known as: Eşkıya Dünyaya; Hükümdar Olmaz
- Genre: Action; Drama
- Written by: Raci Şaşmaz (1-123); Bahadır Özdener (1-199); Berna Aruz (124-199)
- Directed by: Onur Tan (1-199); Zübeyr Şaşmaz (140-199); Baran Özçaylan (140-199)
- Starring: 1. season; Oktay Kaynarca; Deniz Çakır; Müjde Uzman; Yunus Emre Yıldırımer; Ozan Akbaba; Tarık Ünlüoğlu; 2. season; Oktay Kaynarca; Deniz Çakır; Sanem Çelik; Yunus Emre Yıldırımer; Ozan Akbaba; Tarık Ünlüoğlu; 3. season; Oktay Kaynarca; Deniz Çakır; Sanem Çelik; Mesut Akusta; Olgun Şimşek; Yunus Emre Yıldırımer; Ozan Akbaba; Tarık Ünlüoğlu; 4. season; Oktay Kaynarca; Mustafa Üstündağ; Hüseyin Avni Danyal; Yunus Emre Yıldırımer; Ozan Akbaba; Tarık Ünlüoğlu; 5. season; Oktay Kaynarca; Naz Elmas; Mustafa Üstündağ; Hüseyin Avni Danyal; Yunus Emre Yıldırımer; Ozan Akbaba; Burak Sergen; 6. season; Oktay Kaynarca; Sanem Çelik; Hüseyin Avni Danyal; Yunus Emre Yıldırımer; Ozan Akbaba; Ali Sürmeli
- Composers: Ayşe Önder; Levent Güneş
- Country of origin: Turkey
- Original language: Turkish
- No. of seasons: 6
- No. of episodes: 199 (list of episodes)

Production
- Producer: Raci Şaşmaz
- Production locations: Istanbul, Turkey
- Cinematography: Veysel Qilinch
- Running time: 120 minutes

Original release
- Network: ATV
- Release: 8 September 2015 – July 1, 2021

A Bandit Cannot Rule the World (Turkish: Eşkıya Dünyaya Hükümdar Olmaz) is a Turkish television series in the genre of action, drama and crime, the first episode of which was released on September 8, 2015, written by Raci Şaşmaz and Bahadır Özdener, and directed by Onur Tan, Zübeyr Şaşmaz and Baran Özçaylan. The series consists of a total of 6 seasons. Its final episode, the 199th, was released on June 15, 2021. The show was taken off the air in October 2021 due to the disagreement between ATV and the series team.

== About the series' transition to digital ==
The 200th episode was filmed but not broadcast. The episode will be turned into a movie with renewed montage and additional scenes. The new name of the project is “The Last Legend,” and the naming rights belong to ATV. On the other hand, the TV series version of the project will be shot in February and the actor Ozan Akbaba, who plays İlyas Çakırbeyli, will be in the leading role. Oktay Kaynarca, the character of Hızır in the series, is in prison, and Yunus Emre Yıldırımer, the character of Alpaslan, will not appear in the series because he will be shown in exile abroad.

Following this development, ATV announced that it would file a lawsuit against BVB Yapım for 165 million. According to the news circulating behind the scenes, BluTV withdrew from its contract with BVB Yapım after ATV was preparing to file a lawsuit.

== Background ==
Raci Şaşmaz, who co-wrote the series with Bahadır Özdener for 3 seasons, could not pay the salaries of the actors in 2019 and had to transfer the production to ATV İç Yapımlar. Bahadır Özdener continued to write the series script together with Berna Aruz. The first episode of the 7th season, the 200th episode of the show, was shot. However, as a result of the discussions between ATV managers Ömer Numanoğlu and Bahadır Özdener, the tape was not delivered on October 26, 2021, and the episode was not broadcast. It was announced that the series was canceled on October 31, 2021.

== Cast and characters ==
Not: Detailed descriptions of the main characters below, detailed information about supporting characters and other characters, and information about episode numbers. See the character list to obtain.

=== Main characters ===
- Hızır Çakırbeyli (Oktay Kaynarca): He is known as Hızır Reis. (season 1–6)
- Meryem Çakırbeyli (Deniz Çakır): Hızır's first wife. (season 1–3)
- Alparslan Çakırbeyli (Yunus Emre Yıldırımer): Hızır's nephew. (season 1–6)
- İlyas Çakırbeyli (Ozan Akbaba): Hızır's brother. (season 1–6)
- Ünal Kaplan (Tarık Ünlüoğlu): Founding leader of NASA. (season 1–4)
- Şahin Ağa/Şahin Yüksel (Turgay Tanülkü): Hızır's Cell Friend. (Seasons 1–6)
- Hızır Ali Çakırbeyli (Yalçın Hafızoğlu): The son of Hızır. (season 2–6)
- Fahri (Kenan Çoban): Hızır's cellmate. (season 1–5)
- Ceylan Özsoy (Sanem Çelik): David's brother. (season 2–3, season 5–6)
- Ömür Façalı (Ceren Benderlioğlu): Haşmet and Behzat's brother. (season 4–6)
- Nazlı Meriç (Müjde Uzman): Khidr's mistress. (season 1)
- Susan Eliot / Suzi (Meryem Uzerli): CIA agent. İlyas' ex-girlfriend. (season 2)
- Tipi ağa-Murat İspirli (Savaş Özdemir): A member of the table. Hızır's best friend.. (season 1–6)
- Beşir Hamdi Korkmaz (Muhammed Cangören): The father of the Korkmaz family. (season 6)
- Kimsesiz Yaşar (Olgun Şimşek): A member of the Table. Friend of Elijah. (season 3)
- Ekrem Yıldıran (Mesut Akusta): NATO supporter. A member of the Table. (season 3)
- Tufan Tezyürek (Hüseyin Avni Danyal): A member of the Table. (season 4–6)
- Boran Kayalı (Mustafa Üstündağ): A member of the Table. Friend of Elijah. (season 4–5)
- Haşmet Façalı (Turgut Tunçalp): Behzat and Ömür Ün's older brother.(4–6. season)
- Behzat Façalı (Emir Benderlioğlu): Haşmet's brother. Friend of Elijah. (season 4–6)
- Feyyaz Meftun (Burak Sergen): A member of the Table. (season 5)
- Melike Meftun (Selda Alkor): Feyyaz's older sister. (season 5)
- Sevda Meftun (Naz Elmas): Feyyaz's nephew. (season 5)
- Kimsesiz Doğan (Ali Sürmeli): Father of orphans. (season 5–6)
- Bahar Sincanlı (Pelin Akil): Daughter of the Sincan family. (season 6)
- Beşir Hamdi Korkmaz (Muhammed Cangören): He is the father of the Korkmaz family. (season 6)
- Yaman Korkmaz (Engin Benli): Son of the Korkmaz family. (season 6)
- İshak (Caner Kurtaran): Counter-guerrilla member. (season 6)

== Publication calendar ==
Season	Publication day and time	Season beginning	Season final	Withdrawn number of episodes	Section range	Broadcasting year	TV channel
1. season	Tuesday 20.00	8 September 2015	14 June 2016	40	1-40	2015-2016	ATV
2. season	Tuesday 20.00	4 October 2016	30 May 2017	31	41-71	2016–2017	ATV
3. season	Tuesday 20.00	19 September 2017	12 June 2018	36	72-107	2017–2018	ATV
4. season	Tuesday 20.00	25 September 2018	28 May 2019	32	108-139	2018–2019	ATV
5. season	Tuesday 20.00	24 September 2019	28 April 2020	26	140-165	2019–2020	ATV
6. season	Tuesday 20.00	6 October 2020	June 15, 2021 (Last episode)	34	166-199	2020–2021	ATV

- Not: The 200th episode, the first episode of the 7th season of the series, was shot but not broadcast.

== Awards and nominations ==
Year	Award ceremony	Category	Conclusion	Ref
2017	4.Mersin Golden Palm Awards	Best TV Series of the Year	Won	
2017	Moon Life Magazine Awards	Best TV Series of the Year	Won	
