= Sinem Ünsal =

Turkish actress (born 1993)

- Born: 21 June 1993 (age 33)
- Education: Eskişehir Osmangazi University
- Occupation: Actress
- Years active: 2017–present
- Relatives: Gizem Ünsal (sister)

Sinem Ünsal (born June 21, 1993) is a Turkish actress.

== Early life and career ==
Ünsal's mother is of Circassian descent, while her father is of Azerbaijani descent. She is a graduate of Eskişehir Osmangazi University with a degree in Comparative Literature. She started her career as an actress in 2017. In the 2017 series Çoban Yıldızı, she portrayed the character of Güneş, and in the same year she joined the cast of Siyah Beyaz Aşk, playing the role of Gülsüm Aslan. Between 2018 and 2019, she was a regular in the series Kızım, playing the role of Sevgi Günay. Her breakthrough came in 2019 with a leading role in Mucize Doktor, an adaptation of the South Korean TV series Good Doctor.

== Personal life ==
Berk Cankat and Sinem Ünsal have been in a relationship since mid-2023.

In June 2026, Sinem Ünsal was named among 14 people in a celebrity drug investigation with a detention order. Saying she was in Mardin for filming, she only learned about it later and said she was upset her name was involved, but that she respected the process and would return to Istanbul to cooperate. Her boyfriend, Berk Cankat, publicly supported her by sharing her statement and calling her his “kind-hearted life partner”, which drew attention on social media.

== Filmography ==
=== Television ===
Year	Title	Role	Notes
2017	Çoban Yıldızı	Güneş	Supporting role
2017–2018	Siyah Beyaz Aşk	Gülsüm Aslan	Supporting role
2018–2019	Kızım	Sevgi Günay	Supporting role
2019–2021	Mucize Doktor	Nazlı Gülengül	Leading role
2021	Elbet Bir Gün	Feride / Gizem Kılıçlı	Leading role
2022	Gizli Saklı	Naz Arıca / Yaz Güneş	Leading role
2024	Senden Önce	Merve Dağıstan	Leading role
2024–present	Uzak Şehir	Alya Albora	Leading role

=== Theatre ===
Year	Title	Role
2019	Raif ile Letafet	Letafet
2021	Çin'den Mektup	Eda
2022	Aydınlıkevler	Sülün
