= Mert Öcal =

Turkish actor and model (born 1979)

- Born: 12 May 1979 (age 47); Istanbul, Turkey
- Occupations: Actor; model
- Years active: 2004–present
- Title: Best Model of the World (male)
- Term: 2004
- Predecessor: Stefan Alie
- Beauty pageant titleholder
- Title: "Best Model of Turkey 2004" "Best Model of the World 2004"
- Hair colour: Brown
- Eye colour: Green
- Major competitions: Best Model of Turkey (winner); Best Model of the World (winner)

Mert Öcal (born 12 May 1979) is a Turkish actor and model who won Best Model of Turkey 2004 and went on to win Best Model of the World the same year.

His film and television work include appearances in Asla Unutma (2005), Nehir (2005), Rüyalarda Buluşuruz (2006), Oyun Bitti (2007), Görgüsüzler (2008), Kız Annesi (2011), Rüya Peşinde: Takkeci Baba (2011), Bizim Okul (2013), Mahmut ile Meryem (2013), Aşk Yeniden (2015–2016), and Defne'nin Bir Mevsimi (2016).

== Early life ==
Mert Öcal was born on 29 September 1982 in Istanbul, Turkey. Since the age of 18, he is engaged in a variety of sports and activities, including tennis, volleyball, football, and basketball.

== Pageantry ==
=== Best Model of Turkey ===
Mert Öcal competed in the 17th Best Model of Turkey pageant and won the title "Best Model of Turkey 2004".

=== Best Model of the World ===
He represented Turkey at the 17th Best Model of the World pageant where he was crowned Best Model of the World 2004, succeeding Best Model of the World 2003 Stefan Alie of France. He became the fourth man from Turkey, after Kenan İmirzalıoğlu (1997), Faik Ergin (1999), and Kıvanç Tatlıtuğ (2002), to win the Best Model of the World title.

He stands 6 feet 4 inches (1.93 m) tall.

== Acting career ==
Mert Öcal has acted in film and television productions, including the 2005 Show TV drama series Asla Unutma (alongside Ediz Hun, Hülya Koçyiğit, and Göksel Arsoy); 2005 Kanal D drama series Nehir; 2006 Show TV mini-series Rüyalarda Buluşuruz (alongside Selda Alkor); 2007 Kanal D comedy drama series Oyun Bitti (alongside Zeki Alasya); 2008 atv comedy series Görgüsüzler; 2011 Kanal 7 drama series Kız Annesi; 2013 atv comedy series Bizim Okul, and the romantic comedy television series Aşk Yeniden that aired on FOX between 2015 and 2016.

== Filmography ==
=== Film ===
Year	Title	Role	Notes	Ref.
2011	Rüya Peşinde: Takkeci Baba		Television film	
2013	Mahmut ile Meryem			
2016	Defne'nin Bir Mevsimi		Lead	

=== Television ===
Year	Title	Role	Notes	Ref.
2005	Asla Unutma			
2006	Rüyalarda Buluşuruz	Murat		
2007	Oyun Bitti	Murat	Lead	
2008	Görgüsüzler	Yılmaz	Lead	
2011	Kız Annesi	Yalçın		
2013	Bizim Okul	Physics teacher Murat the Cookie		
2015–2016	Aşk Yeniden	Ertan	Lead	
2017	İsimsizler	Tufan	season 2	
2019–2020	Arka Sokaklar	Tarık/Kurye	Supporting	
2020	Sen Çal Kapımı	Prince Seymen	Supporting	

Awards and achievements
Preceded by (France) Stefan Alie	Best Model of the World (male); 2004	Succeeded by (India) Sidharth Shukla
Preceded by Yusuf Şahan Gürdal	Best Model of Turkey (male); 2004	Succeeded by Burak Özçivit
