= Okuyan =

Okuyan is a surname. Notable people with the surname include:

- Kemal Okuyan (born 1962), Turkish politician
- Melahat Okuyan (1924–2025), Turkish veterinary physician
- Yaşar Okuyan (1950–2023), Turkish politician
