= İstiklal Makzume Anatolian High School =

Coordinates: 36.5893°N 36.1621°E

İskenderun İstiklal Makzume Anatolian High School
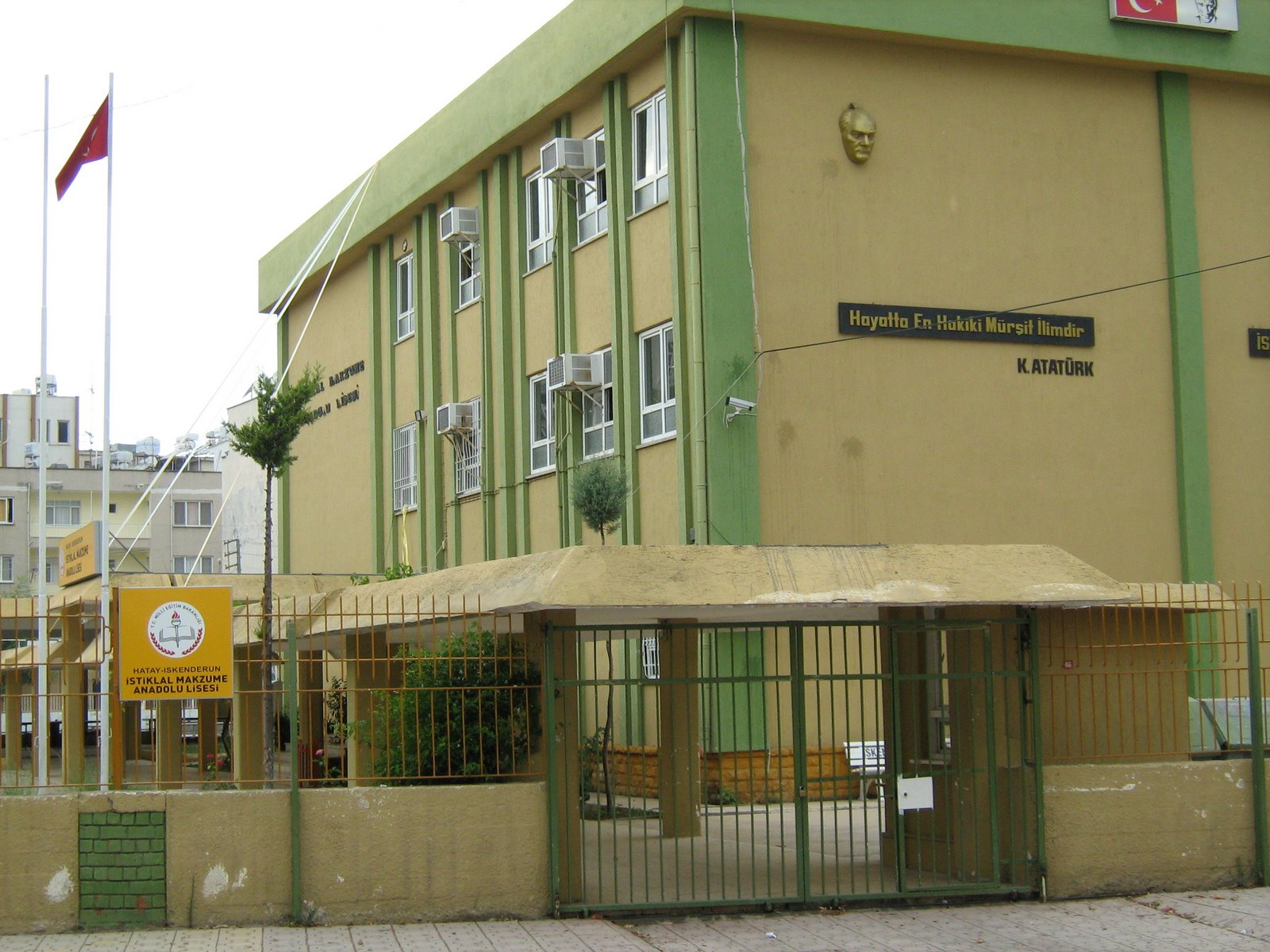
- İskenderun; Turkey

Information
- Type: Anatolian High School
- Established: 1986
- Founder: Lyonel Makzume
- Principal: Seher Akyazıcı
- Language: Turkish
- Website: İMAL

İskenderun İstiklal Makzume Anatolian High School (Turkish: İstiklal Makzume Anadolu Lisesi) is a public high school located in İskenderun, Turkey. Categorized as an Anatolian high school, it belongs to a specific category of public high schools in Turkey recognized for their focus on foreign language instruction and student selection via a nationwide standardized test. The school is considered prestigious in İskenderun, requiring students to achieve a high score on the national high school placement exam for admission.

== Location ==
The school is situated in the Süleymaniye district in the city center of İskenderun, covering an area of approximately 4,000 square meters.

== History ==
Established by businessman Lyonel Makzume in 1986 in honor of his late wife İstiklal Makzume, the school was later donated to the Turkish Ministry of Education to become a public Anatolian High School. According to Jehan Barbur, the granddaughter of the founder Lyonel Makzume, he aimed to establish a school in İskenderun, where he resided, with also a motivation of creating a local educational institution with high standards that his grandchildren could attend. Nevertheless, the connection between Makzume and the school administration was severed when the school refused to admit his grandchildren on his terms.

== Student activities and achievements ==
=== Basketball ===
The school has a basketball team, which regularly participates in regional tournaments. In 2014, the team secured a second-place finish in a province-level tournament, ultimately losing in the final game to IKEM College. In 2023, the basketball team continued its participation in tournaments, achieving a fourth-place ranking among high schools in the Hatay province.

=== Student journalism ===
During her studies at Istiklal Makzume Anadolu Lisesi, Turkish journalist and writer Melike İlgün's engagement with the school newspaper laid the foundations for developing her journalistic skills and aspirations, according to her own statements.

=== Competitive mathematics ===
In 2012, the school's math team won first place in the OYAK Mathematics Competition, a team competition across all high schools in Hatay province.

=== Competitive painting ===
In 2017, Tülay Adıbelli came first among high school students in the national painting competition named Milli İrade ve Vatan Sevgisi (National Will and Love for the Homeland).

=== Debating ===
In 2022, the school won the district-wide high school debating competition across all high schools in İskenderun.

=== Centralized tests ===
The school has garnered recognition for the notable achievements of its students in national university placement exams. In 2001, Mert Poyraz attained the highest score nationally in the Turkish University Entrance Exam (OSS-SAY). The following year, in 2002, Emrullah Yılmaz achieved the second-highest score in the same examination. In 2006, Eren Karaaslan continued this trend by securing the top position nationally in OSS-EA2.

== Reunion events ==
Alumni of the school engage in regular reunion activities. Notably, the graduating class of 1994 convened in a reunion event in 2014, along with their former teachers.

== Facilities ==
In 2022, the school's new library building was opened. Driven by a desire to support the region in the aftermath of the Turkey-Syria earthquakes, Üsküdar Municipality in Istanbul provided support to open a new, modern classroom equipped with computers in 2023.

== Notable alumni ==
- Faik Ergin, actor
- Melike İlgün, writer
- Selin Köseoğlu, actress
