= Erenköy Girls High School =

- Erenköy Kız Anadolu Lisesi
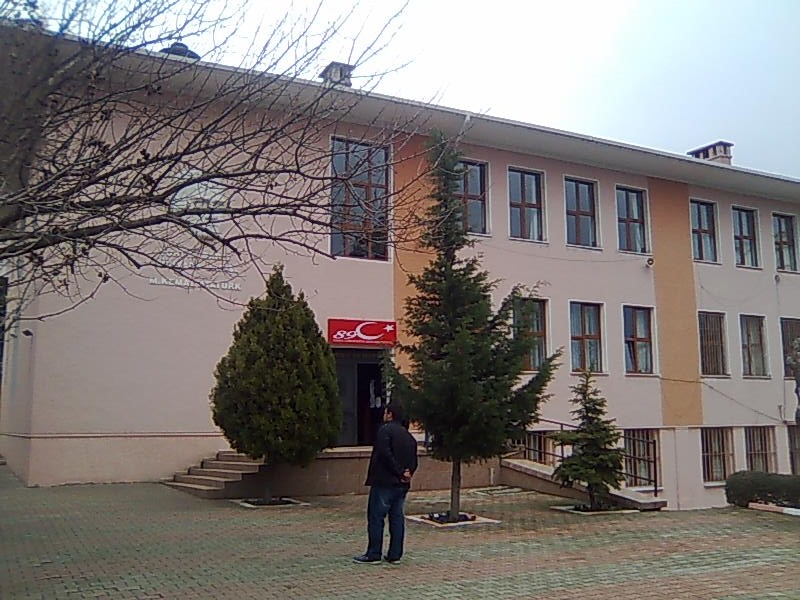
- Entrance to the main building of Erenköy Girls High School

Location
- Ömerpaşa Sok. 82; Erenköy, Kadıköy; Istanbul, 34738; Turkey
- Coordinates: 40°58′38″N 29°04′24″E

Information
- School type: Public Anadolu
- Established: 1911
- Principal: Yavuz Ş. Erturan
- Staff: 5
- Teaching staff: 65
- Gender: Girls

Location of Erenköy Girls High School in Istanbul, Turkey

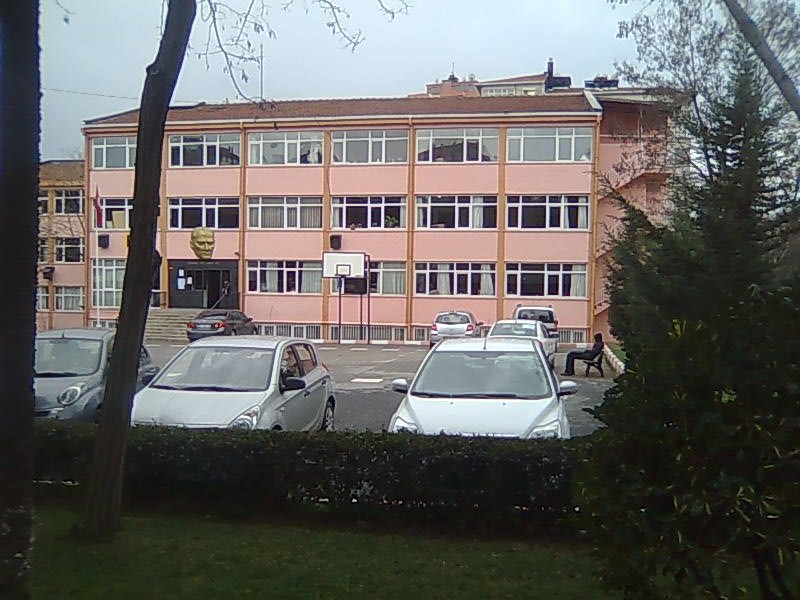
Building B of Erenköy Girls High School

Erenköy Girls High School (Turkish: Erenköy Kız Anadolu Lisesi) is a public girls high school in the Erenköy neighborhood of Kadıköy district in Istanbul, Turkey. The school was founded in 1911 during the Ottoman Empire.

== History ==
Erenköy Girls High School was established 1911 in the Mansion of Nemizade Zihni Bey in the Kabasakal neighborhood of Istanbul. It was later renamed Model School for Girls (Ottoman Turkish: Kız Numune Mektebi) and moved to the Mansion of Rıdvan Pasha. In 1916, the school was finally named Erenköy Girls High School (Ottoman Turkish: Erenköy İnas Sultanisi). The school then moved to a mansion purchased for 7,500 gold coins by the Ministry of Education from Mabeyinci Faik Bey. The school dormitory was extended by purchasing the mansion of Hacı Hüseyin Pasha from its last owner Hatice Sultan (daughter of Murad V).

Education continued at scattered sites after the school building burnt down on February 22, 1945. The school moved into the current building in the academic year 1954-55. From 1990 on, no more boarding students were accepted. Erenköy Girls High School is today an Anadolu-type high school called a "Super High School", at which education is in a foreign language, the courses are computer-aided and the classroom size is limited.

This school has educated generations of Turkish women who have achieved important social standing in the Turkish society. Until 1979, it was a girls-only school, when boy students were also accepted to the school. This practice lasted for only one and a half academic years and the school never again accepted boys.

== Notable teachers ==
- Bedia Muvahhit (1897–1994), a renowned stage and movie actress, served as a teacher for French language between 1921–1923 before her acting career.
- Sabiha Gökçül Erbay (1900–1998), teacher of Turkish literature (1939–1941). Known as one of the first female members of the Turkish parliament
- Remziye Hisar (1902–1992), teacher of chemistry serving as administrative staff

== Notable alumni ==
- Sezgi Sena Akay (born 1995), actress, former professional volleyball player, presenter, and model who was crowned Best Model of the World 2012
- Demet Akbağ (born 1959), theatre and film actress
- Türkan Akyol (1928–2017), graduated 1947. Physician, academic and politician. Turkey's first female government minister and first female university rector.
- Ayten Alpman (1929–2012), jazz and pop singer
- Sabire Aydenir (1910–1991), the first female Turkish veterinary physician
- Günseli Başar (born 1932), Miss Europe 1952
- Muhibbe Darga (1921 – 2018), archaeologist
- Ayşin Demirel (born 1972)
- Gülben Ergen (born 1972), pop singer
- Jale İnan (1914–2001), archaeologist
- Suzan Emine Kaube (born 1942), Turkish-German writer, painter and pedagogue
- Mübeccel Namık, Miss Turkey 1930
- Melahat Ruacan (1906–1974), world's first female supreme court judge
- Hürriyet Sırmaçek (1912 - 1983) Turkey's first female bridge engineer,
- Neriman Elgin (1921–1994), politician and member of the parliament (1983–1987)
- Hale Soygazi (born 1950), film actress
- Setenay Ozbek (born 1961), writer, artist and documentary maker
- Ayfer Tunç (born 1964), contemporary writer
- Bennu Yıldırımlar (born 1969), actress

== Gallery ==
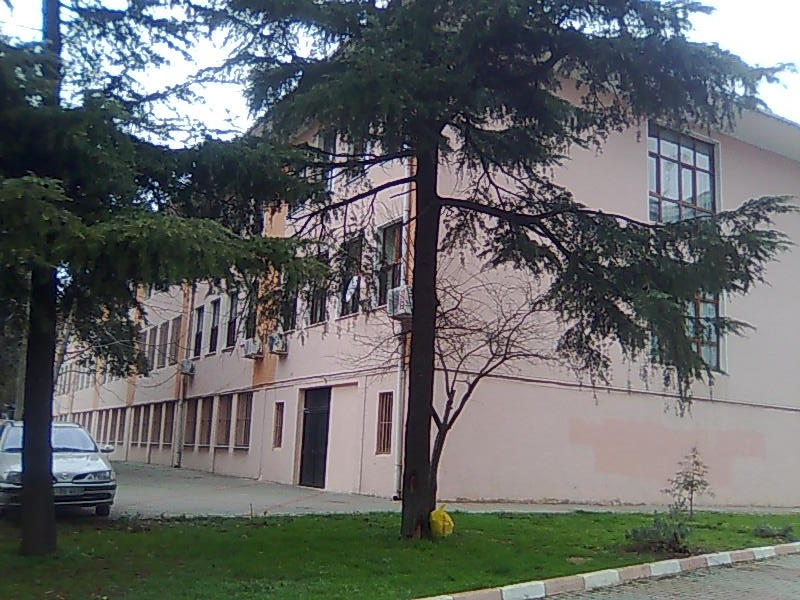

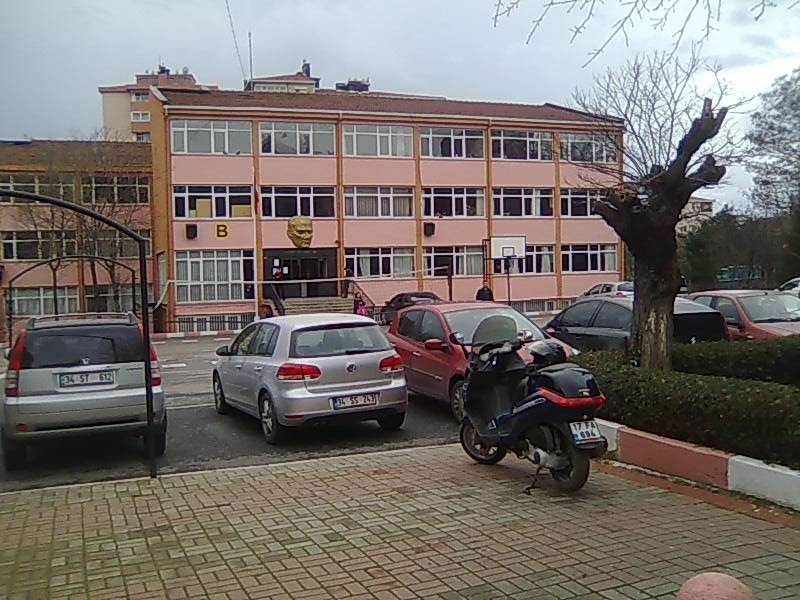
