= Best Model of Turkey =

Female or male beauty competition

Best Model of the World
- Formation: 1990; 36 years ago
- Type: Beauty pageant
- Headquarters: Istanbul
- Location: Turkey
- Official language: English

Best Model of Turkey is a female or male beauty competition. From 1988 to 1993, only Turkey's best female model was chosen in the competition. Since 1993, male models are also included. There were two exceptions: in 2004 when in addition to a male model, two female winners were selected; and in 2009, when the opposite happened and also two male models won.

Best Model of the World is a female or male beauty competition. From 1990 to 1995 Istanbul, Turkey, in 1990 with 44 countries participating.

== Titleholders ==
Year	Best Model of Turkey		Best Model of the World					
Year	Female	Male	Female		Male		Host city	Entrants
Year	Female	Male	Country	Titleholder	Country	Titleholder	Host city	Entrants
1988	Sibel Tan	Pageant not yet established	Colombia	Victorio Azuero	Pageant not yet established	Pageant not yet established	Istanbul, Turkey	Unknown
1989	Begüm Özbek	Pageant not yet established	France	Kao Ardon	Pageant not yet established	Pageant not yet established	Istanbul, Turkey	Unknown
1990	Esin Moralıoğlu	Pageant not yet established	Sweden	Melissa Gromell	Pageant not yet established	Pageant not yet established	Istanbul, Turkey	44
1991	Deniz Pulaş	Pageant not yet established	France	Lohengrin Loret	Pageant not yet established	Pageant not yet established	Istanbul, Turkey	44
1992	Maide Erçelebi	Pageant not yet established	Togo	Rebecca Ayoko	Pageant not yet established	Pageant not yet established	Istanbul, Turkey	64
1993	Ebru Ürün	Berke Hürcan	Turkey	Ebru Ürün	Pageant not yet established	Pageant not yet established	Istanbul, Turkey	53
1994	Sema Şimşek	Burak Hakkı	Spain	Carlota Sosa	Pageant not yet established	Pageant not yet established	Istanbul, Turkey	47
1995	Eylem Çeliker	Volkan Kademlioğlu	France	Muriel Letacq	Greece	Halil Haris Kinadi	Istanbul, Turkey	46 (30 female, 16 male)
1996	Güzide Duran	Fuat Cingiler	Kazakhstan	Rimma Rakhimkovlova	Portugal	Miguel Teixeira	Istanbul, Turkey	62 (34 female, 28 male)
1997	Deniz Akkaya	Kenan İmirzalıoğlu	United Kingdom	Joanne Bradbury	Turkey	Kenan Imirzalioğlu	Istanbul, Turkey	65 (39 female, 26 male)
1998	Burcu Kutluk	Çağdaş Karasu	Singapore	Annetha Ayyavoo	France	Gres Manuel	Istanbul, Turkey	58 (30 female, 28 male)
1999	Tuğba Karaca	Faik Ergin	Senegal	Mar Kewe	Turkey	Faik Ergin	Istanbul, Turkey	70 (38 female, 32 male)
2000	Şenay Akın	Alp Kırşan	Azerbaijan	Sevda Aliyeva	Senegal	Sidy Arc Sissoko	Istanbul, Turkey	68 (38 female, 30 male)
2001	Şenay Akay	Mehmet Akif Alakurt	Turkey	Şenay Akay	France	Sylvain Larochelle	Istanbul, Turkey	92 (44 female, 47 male)
2002	Irmak Atuk	Kıvanç Tatlıtuğ	Portugal	Evelina Pereira	Turkey	Kıvanç Tatlıtuğ	Istanbul, Turkey	92 (45 female, 47 male)
2003	Şebnem Sürücü	Yusuf Şahan Gürdal	Ukraine	Yuliya Lischuke	France	Stefan Alie	Istanbul, Turkey	73 (39 female, 34 male)
2004	Fatma Yaman Simge Tertemiz	Mert Öcal	Egypt	Arwa Gouda	Turkey	Mert Öcal	Istanbul, Turkey	92 (48 female, 44 male)
2005	Tuğçe Güder	Burak Özçivit	Turkey	Tuğçe Güder	India	Siddarth Ashok Shukla	Istanbul, Turkey	98 (57 female, 41 male)
2006	Neslihan Önder	Fatih Cansız	Russia	Yuliya Leskova	Mali	Téne Gaye	Istanbul, Turkey	88 (44 female, 44 male)
2007	Senem Kuyucuoğlu	Kaan Aypulat	Nigeria	Ademokoya Olubunmi Olubokula	Azerbaijan	Rustem Abil Cebrayilov	Istanbul, Turkey	89 (43 female, 46 male)
2008	Yelda Kara	Armağan Oğuz	Central African Republic	Chrstie Juillet	France	Maxime Coutuier	Istanbul, Turkey	91 (45 female, 46 male)
2009	Eda Sedalı Tuğçe Sarıkaya	Erkan Meriç İlhan Şen	Mali	Aïcha Amirou Dicko	Turkey	Erkan Meriç	Sofia, Bulgaria	137 (67 female, 70 male)
2010	Açelya Kartal	Çağatay Ulusoy	Bulgaria	Iva Nikolaeva Atanasova	Serbia	Danijel Mihailovic	Plovdiv, Bulgaria	110 (53 female, 57 male)
2011	Tuğba Melis Türk	Furkan Palalı Serkan Tanırgan	Colombia	Silvia Catalina Llanes Acevedo	Turkey	Furkan Palalı	Istanbul, Turkey	76 (34 female, 42 male)
2012	Sezgi Sena Akay	Berk Atan	Turkey	Sezgi Sena Akay	Turkey	Berk Atan	Istanbul, Turkey	98 (48 female, 50 male)
2013	Ayşenur Özkan	Burak Çelik	Nigeria	Onyinye Emeasoba	Turkey	Burak Çelik	Sofia, Bulgaria	56 (28 female, 28 male)
2014	Cansu Melis Karakuş	Caner Tanrıverdi*	Angola	Ema Diogo	Turkey	Caner Tanriverdi	Istanbul, Turkey	62 (33 female, 29 male)
2015	Yağmur Ayrık	Yılmaz Kunt*	Belgium	Myriam Mawule	Turkey	Yılmaz Kunt	Brussels, Belgium	36 (18 female & 18 male)
2016	Gizem Kayalı	Onur Seyit Yaran*	Nigeria	Ejiro Joy Akpokiniovo	Turkey	Onur Seyit Yaran	Istanbul, Turkey	39 (19 female, 20 male)
2017	Aslıhan Karalar	Efe Sorarlı**	Turkey	Aslıhan Karalar	Sri Lanka	Januka Sachitya Bandara Rajapaksha	Paris, France	47 (22 female, 25 male)
2018	Türkan Geyik	Ulaş Özgür	Morocco	Iman Casablanca	Italy	Marco Sarra	Istanbul, Turkey	56 (24 female, 32 male)
2019	Derya Ekşioğlu	Tolga Kandemir	Turkey	Derya Ekşioğlu	Azerbaijan	Nuru Ahmedov	Istanbul, Turkey	43 (24 female, 19 male)
2020	Oğulşat Gagşalova	Oğuzhan Bolat	No pageant held due to the COVID-19 pandemic					
2021	Oğulşat Gagşalova	Bartu Dilmen	Azerbaijan	Aydan Yeşildağ	Lebanon	Nader Alayan	Istanbul, Turkey	35 (15 female, 20 male)
2022	Büşra Karakaş	Emir Mayacı	Turkey	Büşra Karakaş	Belgium	Theo Groene	Istanbul, Turkey	43 (24 female, 19 male)

== Runner-Up ==
Year	Best Model of the World (Female)	
Year	1st Runner-Up	2nd Runner-Up
2022	Maylin Uyanık USA	Florinda Loki Albania
2021	Marta Piasliak; Belarus	Oğulşat Gagşalova; Turkey
2019	Magali Hadji; Andorra	Sirikul Prayoonsiri; Thailand
2018	Türkan Geyik; Turkey	Anjali Vinodya Ramachandra Brahakmanage; Sri Lanka
2017	Natsupa Thiansri; Thailand	Laurette Pea; Gabon
2016	Gizem Kayalı; Turkey	Valerie Breemans; Belgium
2015	Unknown	Unknown
2014	Cansu Melis Karakuş; Turkey	Rebecca Enz; Liechtenstein
2013	Ayşenur Özkan; Turkey	Yang Zishuo; China
2012	Anais Garnier; Belgium	Antonella Ponso; Argentina
2011	Tuğba Melis Türk; Turkey	Kenlly Yuriskar Palacios Aranguren; Venezuela
2010	Gunay Musayeva; Azerbaijan	Anahi de Jesus Robles Vazquez; Mexico
2009	Dhurata Lipovica; Kosovo	Tuğçe Sarıkaya; Turkey
2008	Yelda Kara; Turkey	Herlys Alejandra Ruiz Aguilar; Margarita Island
2007	Senem Kuyucuoğlu; Turkey	Liu Xiao-Ou; Macau
2006	Neslihan Önder; Turkey	Manette Mercado; Philippines
2005	Oleksandra Reznik; Ukraine	Alexandra Ivancenco; Romania
2004	Bridgette Tolentino Inoferio; Philippines	Unknown; Uzbekistan
2003	Melissa Ann Andales Frye; Philippines	Şebnem Sürücü; Turkey
2002	Irmak Atuk; Turkey	Liu A Nan; China
2001	Katerina Kiper; Ukraine	Yamila Coba; Cuba
2000	Tatiana Raway; Rwanda	Georgana Petkova Dinova; Bulgaria
1999	Alina Selesnyova; Ukraine	Gabriela Stoica; Romania
1998	Yulia Bochkova; Russia	Patricia Lang; Austria
1997	Oumy Bah; Senegal	Jacqueline Lienard; Republic of the Congo
1996	Geraldine Lisek; Monaco	Karolina Bednarz; Poland
1995	Agnieszka Jarocka; Poland	Caroline Chazelles; Monaco
1994	Lucy Seruwagi; Uganda	Anja Weise; Germany
1993	Georgia; United Kingdom	Militza; Monaco
1992	Victoria Silvstedt; Sweden	Khoudia Seye; Senegal
1991	Deniz Pulaş; Turkey	Christina Wong; Malaysia
1990	Mônica Valéria Ponce Rodrigues; Brazil	Helen Chua; Singapore

Year	Best Model of the World (Male)	
Year	1st Runner-Up	2nd Runner-Up
2022	Emir Mayacı Turkey	Noah Leon Simon Spain
2021	Oğuzhan Bolat; Turkey	Leo P.J. Colin; France
2019	Fabio Ponzo; Belgium	Tolga Kandemir; Turkey
2018	Shakir Ahmedzade; Azerbaijan	Ulaş Özgür; Turkey
2017	Efe Sorarli; Turkey	Gregory Oplynus; Denmark
2016	Okan Demirok; Serbia	Khaan Roland; Germany
2015	Roussouw Steenkamp; Belgium	Unknown
2014	Sébastien Maeyens; Belgium	Jonathan Bwanga; Democratic Republic of the Congo
2013	Douglas Schwengber da Silva; Brazil	Lucas Maspimby Carriel; Martinique
2012	Nicolas Ruel; France	Seïd Mahamat; Chad
2011	Raphael Ventura; Belgium	Frédéric Cantillon; Canada
2010	Abdullah Ibrahim Gayberi; Turkey	Alex Martínez Prunez; Spain
2009	Vasa Nestorovic; Serbia	Bruno Damasceno e Souza Fernandes; Brazil
2008	Armağan Oğuz; Turkey	Christian Trenche Ocasio; Puerto Rico
2007	Lionel Denis; Colombia	Guillaume Duranton; Liechtenstein
2006	Sven Kiebooms; Belgium	Adrien Condeni; France
2005	Burak Özçivit; Turkey	Grégory Destordeur; Luxembourg
	Unknown	Unknown
2003	Jimmy Gravillon; Guadeloupe	Roshan Massillamany Ranawana; Sri Lanka
2002	Fabrice Bertrand Wattez; France	Ji Huan Bo; China
2001	Mehmet Akif Alakurt; Turkey	Edward Kazanov; Russia
2000	Adnan Taletovich; Slovenia	Alp Kirşan; Turkey
1999	Johann Berndt; Belgium	Vishal Singh Yadav; India
1998	Peter Eriksen; Sweden	Çağdaş Karasu; Turkey
1997	Marc Grosy; France	Gerald Suitner; Austria
1996	Patrick Musimu; Zaire	Fuat Cingiler; Turkey
1995	Darryl Osada; United Kingdom	Christian Forcher; Austria

== See also ==
- List of beauty pageants
