= Alp Kırşan =

Turkish actor and model

- Born: 3 November 1979 (age 46); Karşıyaka, İzmir, Turkey
- Occupations: Actor, model, presenter
- Years active: 2002–present
- Spouse: Zeynep Dörtkardeşler (m. 2014)

Alp Kırşan (born 3 November 1979) is a Turkish actor.

Kırşan began his career as a professional model. He was chosen as 'Best Model of Turkey' in 2002. He hosted a program Sabah Şekerleri with Özlem Yıldız. He began his acting with a play Oyunun Oyunu at the Yasemin Yalçın Theatre. Kırşan became well known for his role as Yiğit in the sitcom Çat Kapı and has since acted in several films and TV series, usually in comedic roles.

== Filmography ==
Cinema
Year	Title	Role	Notes
2006	Dünyayı Kurtaran Adamın Oğlu	Elizbar	
2006	Keloğlan Karaprens'e Karşı	Robin Hood	
2007	Çılgın Dersane	Sakar Bekir	
2008	Cool School Camp	Sakar Bekir	
2008	Kadri'nin Götürdüğü Yere Git	Cem	
2008	Avanak Kuzenler	Serkan	
Television
Year	Title	Role	Notes
1999	Deli Yürek	Levent	episodes 89 and 90
2002	Pembe Patikler	Kemal	
2003	Kampüsistan	Emre	
2005	Cennet Mahallesi	Mert	
2005	Çat Kapı	Yiğit	
2006	Ümit Milli	Mert	
2006	Buzda Dans	Himself	Contestant
2007	Üç Tatlı Cadı	Can	
2008	Hayat Güzeldir	Ziya	episode 13
2009	Sıkı dostlar	Serhat	
2011	Akasya Durağı	Çınar	
2011	Yok Böyle Dans	Himself	Contestant
2012	Survivor Ünlüler - Gönüllüler	Himself	Contestant
2012–2016
2012–2016	Yetenek Sizsiniz Türkiye	Himself	Presenter
2013–2014	Survivor Ünlüler - Gönüllüler	Himself	Presenter
2015	Survivor All Star	Himself	Presenter
2015	1 Alp 3 Çocuk	Himself	Presenter
2016	Survivor 2016	Himself	Presenter
2017	Survivor 2017	Himself	Presenter
2018	Survivor All Star-Gönüllüler	Himself	Presenter
