= Yalçın Hafızoğlu =

Turkish actor

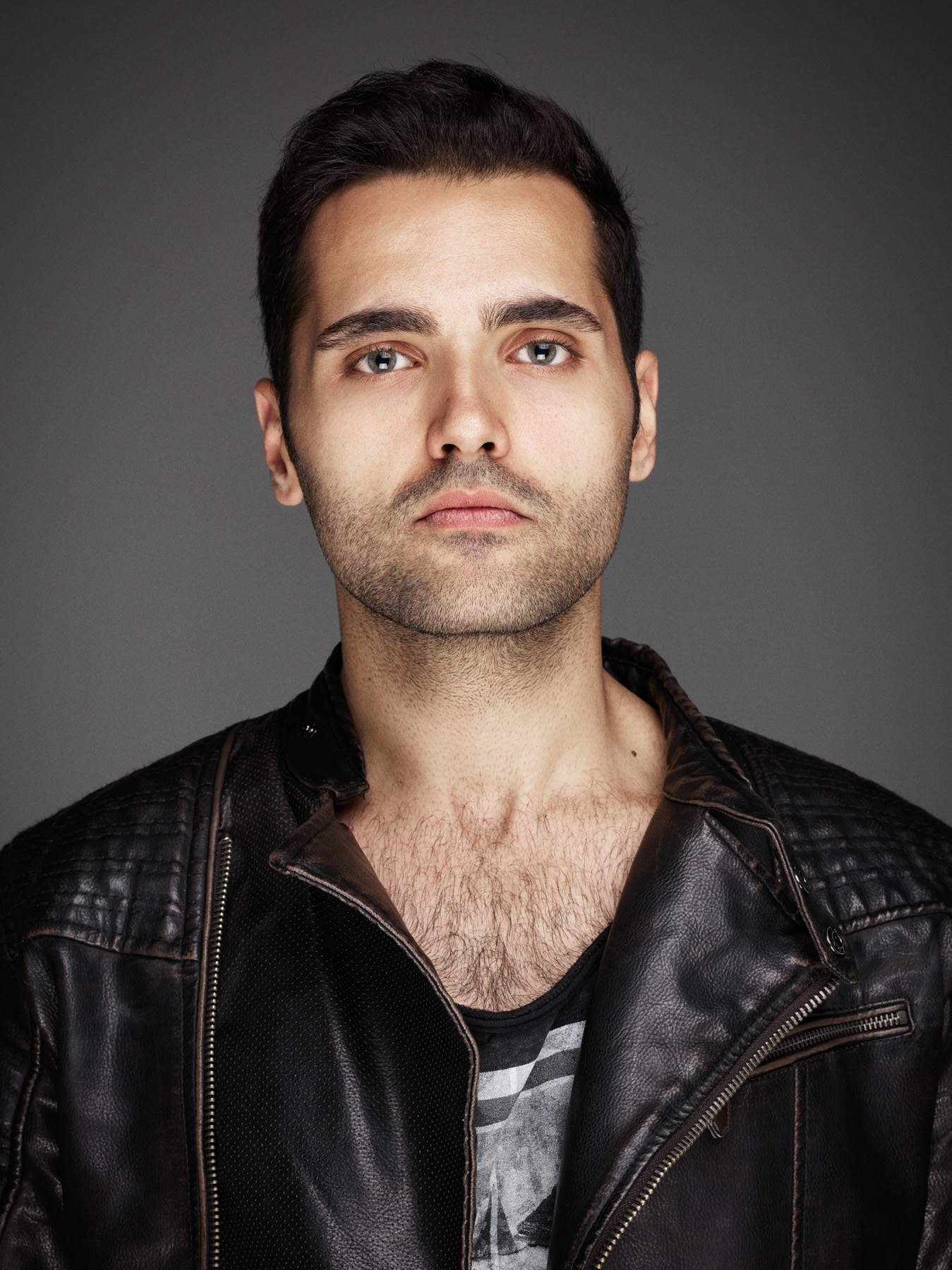
- Born: 18 August 1989 (age 36); Istanbul, Turkey
- Education: Kocaeli University Environmental Engineering Haliç University Conservatory Theatre (master's degree)
- Occupations: Actor, musician

Yalçın Hafızoğlu (born 18 August 1989) is a Turkish actor. He is best known for his roles in the long-running crime series Kiralık Aşk, and for his work in A bandit cannot rule the world (2015–2021).

== Filmography ==
Television
Year	Production	Role	Channel
2016	Kiralık Aşk	Selim	Star TV
2016-2021	Eşkiya Dünyaya Hükümdar Olmaz	Hızır Ali Çakırbeyli	atv
2022	Gülümse Kaderine	Can	FOX
2022	Yalnız Kurt	Barış Serbey	atv
2023	Yüz Yıllık Mucize	Cem	Star TV
2024	Kör Nokta	Kerem Sayman	atv
Yakında	Zembilli	Tarık	atv
Sinema
Yıl	Yapım	Rol	Notlar
2018	Keşif Çanakkale	Roy	
2022	Sevmedim Deme	Muhammet	
2022	Omuz Omuza	Muhammet	
2022	Sen ve Ben	Gökhan	
2023	Arap Kadri ve Tarzan	Alper	

Video clip
Year	Artist	Clip	Notes
2012	Gürcan Ersoy	Eski Şehir	Müzisyen
2018	Alkera	Falls Within	Müzisyen, Yapımcı
2019	Arıza Kontrol Saati	Akrep Yelkovan	Müzisyen, Yapımcı

== Discography ==
Discography
Year	Artist	Work	Notes
2017	Shall We?	Shall We?	EP Albüm, Müzisyen
2018	Fikret Ertan	Bir Şans Ver	EP Albüm, Müzisyen
2018	Alkera	Live In Sin	2'li single, Müzisyen, Yapımcı
2018	Arıza Kontrol Saati	Neredeyim Ben?	3'lü single, Müzisyen, Yapımcı
2019	Arıza Kontrol Saati	Akrep Yelkovan	3'lü single, Müzisyen, Yapımcı
2020	Alkera	Coexist	3'lü single, Müzisyen, Yapımcı
