= The White Angel (2007 film) =

- Theatrical poster
- Directed by: Mahsun Kırmızıgül
- Written by: Mahsun Kırmızıgül
- Produced by: Murat Tokat; A. Levent Üngör
- Starring: Mahsun Kırmızıgül; Arif Erkin Güzelbeyoğlu; Yıldız Kenter; Erol Günaydın; Sarp Apak; Lale Belkıs; Gazanfer Özcan
- Cinematography: Eyüp Boz
- Distributed by: Boyut Film
- Release date: 16 November 2007
- Running time: 115 min.
- Country: Turkey
- Language: Turkish
- Budget: $3,000,000
- Box office: $9,759,677

The White Angel (Turkish: Beyaz Melek) is a 2007 Turkish drama film, written and directed by Mahsun Kırmızıgül, which follows the story of two Eastern youths who find themselves in a rest home after their father comes down with cancer. The film, which went on general release across Turkey on 16 November 2007, won the Remi Award at the 41st WorldFest-Houston International Film Festival and was the second highest-grossing Turkish film of 2007.

== Plot ==
Ali and Reşat bring their father Ahmet who is suffering from brain cancer for chemotherapy treatment in Istanbul. Unable to bear the treatment and thinking himself to be a burden, Ahmet runs away from the hospital and manages to reach a home for elders. The residents believe him to be abandoned by his children and take him in. Ali and Reşat find him but decide to let him stay when they see that he is happy there. They learn the stories and backgrounds of each of the elders. Two of them, Yaşar and Nebahat have fallen in love and plan to get married. Ahmet arrangers for a big wedding and invites them to his home village in Diyarbakır for their honeymoon together with all the other elders.

== Cast ==
- Mahsun Kırmızıgül - Ali
- Arif Erkin Güzelbeyoğlu - Ahmet
- Yıldız Kenter - Melek
- Nejat Uygur - Gazi Cemal
- Yavuz Bingöl - Hıdır
- Erol Günaydın - Commander Vahit
- Sarp Apak - Reşat
- Zeynep Tokuş - Nazlı
- Toron Karacaoğlu - Yorgo
- Salih Kalyon - Hacı
- Cezmi Baskın - Sabri
- Lale Belkıs - Nebahat]
- Ali Sürmeli - Zeki
- Tomris Oğuzalp - Suzan
- Fırat Tanış - Musa
- Fadik Sevin Atasoy - Hatice
- Necmi Yapıcı - Ömer
- Erol Demiröz - Laz İlhan
- Cihat Tamer - Huzurevi Müdürü Tayyar
- Nurşim Demir - Bakıcı
- Tanju Tuncel - Perihan
- Hüseyin Avni Danyal - Selim
- Lale Tancı - Sultan Hemşire
- Gazanfer Özcan - Palyaço
- Emel Sayın - Herself
- Suna Selen - Mızgin
- Bilge Zobu - Yaşar Hoca

== Reception ==
=== Reviews ===
Today's Zaman reviewer M. Nedim Hazar states that the film contains, the East-West contradiction and a comparison of values. It brings the dominating force of the West -- the mind -- and that of the East -- the heart - face to face, but doesn't take a folkloric approach to the East-West comparison as in Yılmaz Erdoğan's movies. Apart from this, it still falls into the marshland of exaggerated caricature-ization which seems to have "worked into the veins" of the celebrities who star in the film. Moviegoers might be fond of this, but it is still an important setback for a movie. He concludes it is a film, that will shock -- in a positive sense -- those whose expectations for the film are very low because of Kırmızıgül. It's also a movie that is very "presentable," whose language and message is very clear. In addition, it contains as much laughter and tears as any Yeşilçam movie does. It should be watched and applauded as a first film of a first-time director..

=== Awards ===
- 41st WorldFest-Houston International Film Festival (Huston): Remi Award.

Awards
Preceded by -	Turkcell First Film Award; 2008	Succeeded by Autumn
