= Sezgi Sena Akay =

Turkish actress, presenter and model (born 1994)

- Born: 31 October 1994 (age 31); Istanbul, Turkey
- Education: Yeditepe University
- Occupations: Actress; model; presenter
- Years active: 2012–present
- Notable work: Acı Aşk; Muhteşem Yüzyıl: Kösem; Zeytin Tepesi
- Spouse: Emir Hasoğlu (m. 2019; div. 2022)
- Height: 1.84 m (6 ft 0.5 in); In 2012: 1.81 m (5 ft 11.3 in)
- Beauty pageant titleholder
- Title: "Best Model of Turkey 2012" "Best Model of the World 2012"
- Hair colour: Naturally light brown
- Eye colour: Blue–Green
- Major competitions: Best Model of Turkey (winner); Best Model of the World (winner)

Sezgi Sena Akay (born 31 October 1994) is a Turkish actress, former professional volleyball player, presenter, and model who was crowned Best Model of the World 2012. She is the youngest and 42nd titleholder in the pageant's history and the fourth woman from Turkey to win Best Model of the World. She previously won Best Model of Turkey 2012. She began her modelling career in Paris.

She started playing volleyball at a very young age. She played for Galatasaray S.K. for five years and later for Fenerbahçe S.K. Women's under-18 Volleyball Team for a year.

In 2014, she played Nevin Karatay in the Kanal D romantic drama and thriller series Zeytin Tepesi (Turkish: Olive Hill). Her role Nevin Karatay was equivalent to that of Elena Monforte in the original Italian version Le tre rose di Eva (Italian: The Three Roses of Eva). In 2015, she hosted the Magazin Postası programme on FOX. Between 2015 and 2016, she was cast as lead character in SHOW TV drama series Acı Aşk (Turkish: Bitter Love), an adaptation of the South Korean television series Cruel Love (2007–2008). Since January 2017, she portrays Murad IV's Imperial consort Sanavber in the second season of the Historical drama series Muhteşem Yüzyıl: Kösem (Turkish: The Magnificent Century: Kösem) broadcast on FOX.

== Early life and education ==
Sezgi Sena Akay was born on 31 October 1994 in Istanbul, to Circassian parents. She has no siblings. After graduating from Erenköy Girls' High School, she enrolled in the Department of Public Relations and Publicity, Faculty of Communication, at Yeditepe University.

== Sports career ==
She started playing volleyball at a very young age. She played for Galatasaray S.K. for five years and later for Fenerbahçe S.K. Women's under-18 Volleyball Team for a year.

== Pageantry ==
=== Best Model of Turkey ===
Sezgi Sena Akay competed in the 25th Best Model of Turkey pageant and won the title "Best Model of Turkey 2012" on 15 December 2012. The event was held on the Galatasaray Islet (Suada) in Istanbul.

One of the lead judges of the competition, fashion designer Yıldırım Mayruk, stated that Sezgi Sena Akay is "the most beautiful and fresh model of the last twenty-five years".

=== Best Model of the World ===
She represented her nation, Turkey, at the Best Model of the World 2012 pageant, which was held on 10 December 2012, where she was crowned Best Model of the World 2012 and the Belgian representative became the first runner-up. This is the fourth time a Turkish woman has won the Best Model of the World crown.

At the age of 17, she stood 5 feet 11.3 inches (1.81 m) tall and weighed 121 lbs (55 kg). She grew 1.2 inches (three centimetres) taller in two years and stands 6 feet 0.5 inches (1.84 m).

== Acting career ==
Her debut role as an actor was in the 2014 television drama Zeytin Tepesi which was shot in Ayvalık, Balıkesir. Her role Nevin Karatay was equivalent to that of Elena Monforte in the original Italian version Le tre rose di Eva (Italian: The Three Roses of Eva).

In 2015, she hosted the Magazin Postası programme on FOX.

Between 2015 and 2016, she was cast as lead character Melek Yılmaz Köklükaya in SHOW TV drama series Acı Aşk (Turkish: Bitter Love), an adaptation of the South Korean television series Cruel Love (2007–2008). She also played violin in the series.

Since January 2017, she portrays Murad IV's Imperial consort and Safavid Sanavber in the second season of the historical drama series Muhteşem Yüzyıl: Kösem (Turkish: The Magnificent Century: Kösem) broadcast on FOX.

== Filmography ==
=== Television ===
Year	Title	Role	Notes
2012	Beyaz Show	Herself (guest)	Episode: "19 October 2012"
2014	Zeytin Tepesi	Nevin Karatay	
2015	Magazin Postası	Herself (host)	
2015–2016	Acı Aşk	Melek Yılmaz Köklükaya	Leading role
2017	Muhteşem Yüzyıl: Kösem	Sanavber Hatun	Supporting role
2017	Meryem	Sevinç	
2017–2018	Hıçkırık	Nalan Karaoğlu	

== Awards and nominations ==
Year	Award	Category	Result	Ref.
2012	Best Model of Turkey	Best Model of Turkey (Female)	Won	
2012	Best Model of the World	Best Model of the World (Female)	Won	

Awards and achievements
Preceded by (Colombia) Silvia Catalina Llanes	Best Model of the World (female); 2012	Succeeded by (Nigeria) Onyinye Emeasoba
Preceded by Tuğba Melis Türk	Best Model of Turkey (female); 2012	Succeeded by Ayşenur Özkan
