= Nejat Uygur =

Turkish actor and comedian

- Born: Nejat Günhan; 10 August 1927; Kilis, Turkey
- Died: 18 November 2013 (aged 86); Istanbul, Turkey
- Occupations: Actor, comedian
- Spouse: Necla Uygur (m. 1950)
- Children: 5 sons

Nejat Günhan Uygur (10 August 1927 – 18 November 2013) was a Turkish actor and comedian.

== Early years ==
Nejat Uygur was born on 10 August 1927 as the second of three children to an officer father and a teacher mother. He acted on stage already in his school years.

Uygur attended Academy of Fine Arts (today: Mimar Sinan Fine Arts University) to study sculpture, however, without finishing it.

== Acting career ==
He began his theatre career by establishing his own "Nejat Uygur Theatre" in the end of the 1940s. He toured with his theatre across the country. Nejat Uygur became unforgettable with his comedy plays such as Cibali Karakolu, Kaynanatör, Hastane mi Kestane mi?, Miğferine Çiçek Eken Asker, Minti Minti, Sizinki Can da Bizimki Patlıcan mı?, Son Umudum Milli Piyango, Şeyini Şey Ettiğimin Şeyi, Şeytandan 29 Gün Evvel Doğan Çocuk, Zamsalak, Alo Orası Tımarhane mi?, Aman Özal Duymasın, Benim Annem Evden Neden Kaçtı?.

In addition to his theatre plays, he starred also in a number of movies, most notable in Cafer Bey. His last appearances were in Beyaz Melek and Vizontele Tuubaa.

He also shared the stage in many plays with his sons Süheyl and Behzat.

== Final years ==
On 10 September 2009, Nejat Uygur was hospitalized in Istanbul due to watershed stroke that paralyzed him on the left body side. He died on 18 November 2013 at the age of 86 caused by sepsis in the hospital, where he was treated since then. He is survived by his wife Necla Uygur and his five sons Ahmet, Süheyl, Süha, Kemal and Behzat Uygur.

Following a memorial ceremony at the Cemal Reşit Rey Concert Hall and the religious funeral at the Teşvikiye Mosque, he was buried at the Zincirlikuyu Cemetery.

== Recognition ==
In 1998, he was honored with the title State Artist bestowed by the Ministry of Culture.

== Filmography ==
Film
Year	Title	Role	Notes
1970	Cafer Bey	Cafer	
1971	Iyi fakir ve kibar	Cafer	
2004	Vizontele Tuuba	Haci Zübeyir	
2007	The White Angel	Gazi Cemal	
