= Muhibbe Darga =

Turkish archaeologist

- Born: 13 June 1921; Istanbul
- Died: 6 March 2018 (aged 96); Istanbul, Turkey
- Citizenship: Turkey
- Occupations: Archaeologist, Hittitologist
- Known for: Woman in Ancient Anatolia
- Title: Professor

Academic background
- Education: Erenköy Girls High School, Istanbul University
- Thesis: Woman in Ancient Anatolia (1976)
- Academic advisor: Helmuth Theodor Bossert

Muhibbe Darga (13 June 1921 – 6 March 2018) was a Turkish archaeologist. She was the granddaughter of Darugazade Mehmet Emin Bey, Sultan Abdülhamid's first chamberlain, the poet and translator of Jules Verne’s novels from French into Turkish.

== Early life ==
Darga was born in Istanbul in June 1921 and was brought up by French governesses. She studied in Paris and Istanbul. Her father was a doctor and because of her father’s professional obligations, she traveled through Anatolia in the 1930s with her family. Roman and Greek history, debates on art and literature were the staple fair at the dinner table of this intellectual family of the late Ottoman era. Moreover, the family celebrated all religious rituals of the city like Christmas, Easter, Ramadan and sacrificial festivals, organizing fancy dress parties.

== Education and career ==
Darge attended Istanbul University’s Hittitology Department at the beginning of the 1940s. She would meet many notables of Archeology at this faculty, founded by Prof. Helmuth Theodor Bossert who fled from Germany to Turkey. Her enthusiasm and extravert personality, excellence in French and German and of course passion for Archeology drew attention.

After Prof Bossert discovered Karatape, a very important excavation site from Hittite era, Darga accompanied him in late 40s. She learned a lot from her tutor on the significance of history and archeology, and the Turkey of those days, during their travels and investigations on horseback. After her researches on Archeology in Germany and France, Darga concentrated on philology and then attained her professorship. In her book Woman in Anatolia, she indicated the status of women in this land and in her Hittite Art; she drew the attention of not only intellectuals but also the general public.

After attending several excavations, at the very end of the 1970s, she started to preside over the Şemsiyetepe historical site in the southeast of Turkey, which is now under water after a regional dam construction. After a decade of excavation efforts in Şemsiyetepe, just near the river Euphrates, she commenced Dorylaion, a Phrygian-Hittite settlement located in Eskişehir, Central Anatolia. She gave many lectures in Turkey and abroad. Presently the President of the Dorylaion excavations, She was also an honorary member of Turkish Antiquities’ Sciences Institute and reporting member of the German Archeological Institute. She died in March 2018 at the age of 96 in Istanbul.
