= Aykut Oray =

Turkish actor (1942–2009)

- Born: 13 October 1942; Üsküdar, Istanbul, Turkey
- Died: 11 August 2009 (aged 66); Köyceğiz, Muğla, Turkey
- Occupation: Actor
- Years active: 1963–2009
- Spouse: Suhandan Oray

Aykut Oray (13 October 1942 – 11 August 2009) was a Turkish actor active between 1963 and 2009. He was, perhaps, best known for his work on the Turkish dramatic comedy series, Bizimkiler. Oray also had a brief career in politics during his later life, becoming a member of the Republican People's Party.

Oray was born in Üsküdar, Istanbul, Turkey, on 13 October 1942. He had been a professional actor since 1963, appearing in both film and television roles.

Oray was found dead in his hotel room in Köyceğiz, Muğla Province, Turkey, on the Aegean Sea, on 11 August 2009. An autopsy carried out in Istanbul revealed that he had died of a heart attack. Oray had been staying in Köyceğiz while attending a local film festival. He was survived by his wife and two children.

Turkish Prime Minister Recep Tayyip Erdoğan sent condolences to Oray's family and the acting community saying, "I am deeply saddened by actor Aykut Oray’s death."

The leader of Turkey's Republican People's Party (CHP) Deniz Baykal also gave tribute to Oray, a member of the CHP, "Aykut Oray has shown his faith in an organized society and resolution in taking responsibility by joining the CHP. His death is a big loss for both the artistic community and the democratic political community."

== Filmography ==
- Mezuniyet - 2009
- Hayal ve Gerçek - 2007
- Şarkılar Susmasın - 2006
- Janjan - 2006
- Eve Giden Yol 1914 - 2006
- Eksik Etek Şehmuz 2006
- Davetsiz Misafir - 2005
- Halk Düşmanı - 2004
- Uy Başuma Gelenler - 2004
- Ömerçip - 2002
- Koltuk Sevdası - 2001
- The Waterfall (Şellale) - 2001
- Şarkıcı - 2000
- Gurbetçiler - 1996
- Çiçek Taksi - 1995
- Zzzzt FM - 1994
- Rumuz Sev Beni - 1993
- Sevgili Ortak - 1993
- Yazlıkçılar - 1993
- Ana....Şehmuz - 1991
- Bir Milyara Bir Çocuk - 1990
- Bizimkiler - 1989
- Bir Garip Yolcu - 1972
