= Uzak Şehir =

Turkish television series

- Genre: Drama
- Based on: Al Hayba
- Written by: Gülizar Irmak
- Directed by: Yıldız Aşanboğa; Emre Aybek; Ahmet Katıksız
- Starring: Ozan Akbaba; Sinem Ünsal; Müfit Kayacan; Atakan Özkaya
- Composer: Atakan Ilgazdağ
- Country of origin: Turkey
- Original language: Turkish
- No. of seasons: 3
- No. of episodes: 73

Production
- Executive producers: Kerem Çatay; Lale Eren
- Production companies: Ay Yapım; AyNA Yapım

Original release
- Network: Kanal D
- Release: 11 November 2024 – present

Uzak Şehir (English title: Far Away) is a Turkish drama television series based on the 2017 Lebanese series Al Hayba. It premiered on Kanal D on 11 November 2024. The series stars are Ozan Akbaba and Sinem Ünsal.

The series is filmed in the village of Narlı, which is part of the Midyat district of Mardin.

== Plot ==
The story of Uzak Şehir begins when Alya Albora travels from Canada to Mardin with her son, Deniz, to fulfil her late husband's wish for the family to return to their homeland. However, she soon finds herself under the powerful influence of her in-laws, who force her to confront the hardships and tragic losses of her past. As the family's secrets begin to emerge, Alya and Deniz must fight to survive and find peace.

== Cast ==
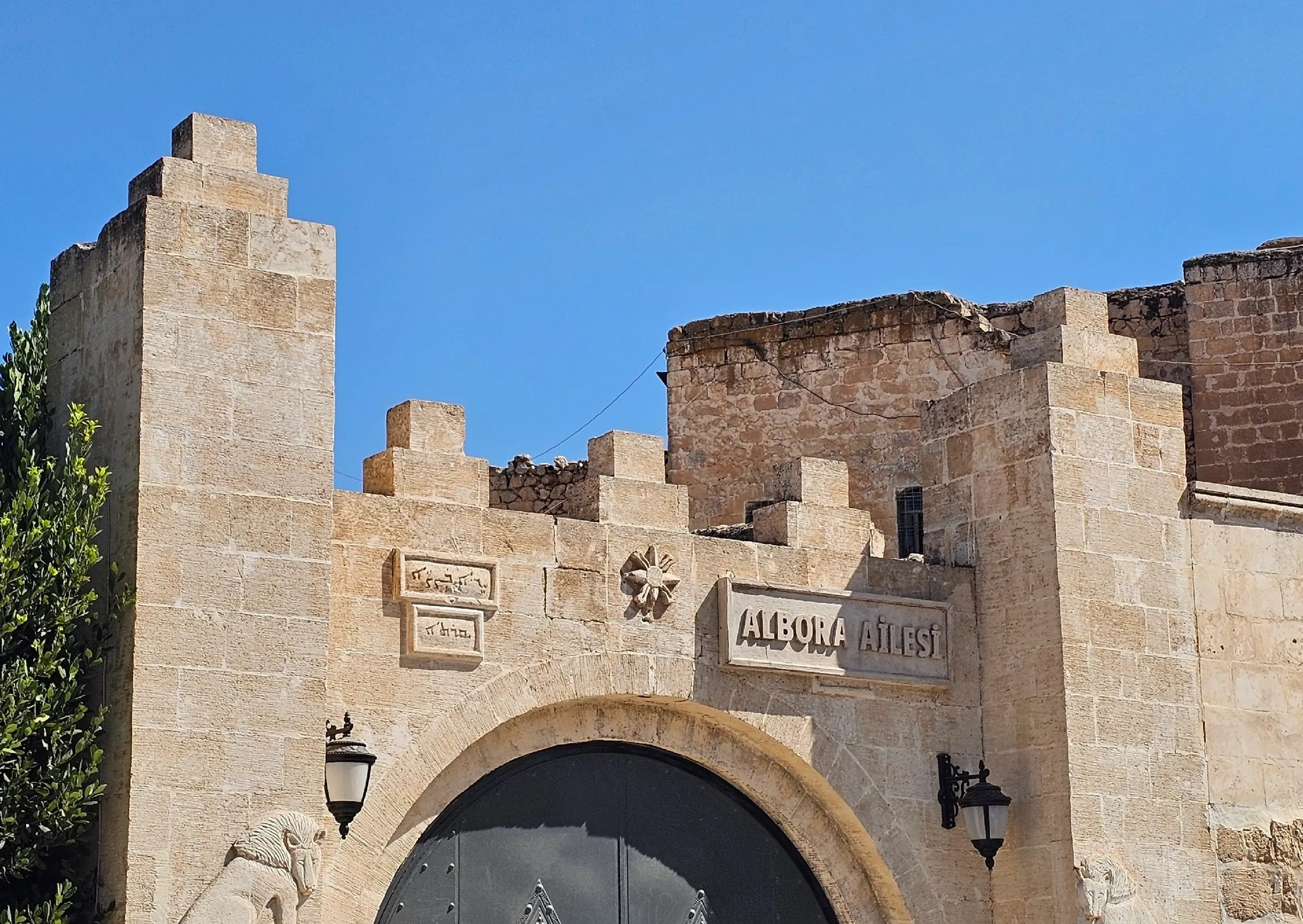
The Basse family house in Tur Abdin, which became the in-show Albora family residence

- Ozan Akbaba as Cihan Albora
- Sinem Ünsal as Alya Smith Albora
- Müfit Kayacan as Ecmel Albora
- Ferit Kaya as Demir Baybars
- Sinan Demirer as Muzaffer Sancak
- Zeynep Kankonde (season 1) and Banu Fotocan (season 2) as Ümmü Sancak
- Mehmet Polat as Hasan Karalı
- Gonca Cilasun as Sadakat Albora
- Kuzey Gezer as Deniz Cihan Albora
- Alper Çankaya as Şahin Albora
- Sahra Şaş as Nare Albora
- Atakan Özkaya as Kaya Albora
- Dilin Döğer as Zerrin Albora Baybars
- İlkay Kayku Atalay as Fidan Albora
- Yaren Güldiken as Pakize Sancak
- Burak Şafak as Kadir Yolcu
- Barış Yalçın as Erol Taşkın
- Emre Kapar as Şehmuz
- Muzaffer Arık as Beyto
- Samet Akkurt as Bilal
- Halil Erik as Halil
- Mine Kılıç as Mine Doğan
- Muttalip Müjdeci as Halis Koroğlu
- Yunus Eski as Özkan Bulut
- Nazmi Kırık as Nadim Baybars
- Maral Tatar as Cansu
- Mehmet Yaşa as Fadil
- Ozan Turan as Feyzo
- Berkem Binbaşıoğlu as Şeref
- Ahmet Özdaş as Remzi
- Çağla Şimşek as İpek Önderlioğlu
- Tanju Bilir as Ahamada
- Tarhan Karagöz as Vurgun Çelebi
- Burç Kümbetlioğlu as Boran Albora
- Ozan Ayhan as Avukat İzzet Erbaş
- Hande Dilan Yalçin as Şeyda
- Ömer Kızıl as Dilaver Keskin
- Cennet Topçu as Neriman Keskin
- Ezgi Kaya as Zeynep Keskin
- Önem Pişkin as Façalı
- Mehmet Gök as Hikmet Yüksel
- Çağrı Kılıç as Cemal Yüksel
- Mahmut Cevher as Mahmut Nalhanoğlu
- Anıl İlter as Doktor Uğur Kılınç
- Nursel Köse as Fikriye Gürdel
- Nihat Altınkaya as Doktor Yalçin
- Kevork Türker as Hakim
- Serhat Nalbantoglu as Doktor Fikret Kilinç
- Vural Ceylan as Gecesi Mekan Sahibi

== Series overview ==
| Series | Episodes | Originally released | |
| Series | Episodes | First released | Last released |
|---|---|---|---|
| 1 | 28 | 12 December 2024 | 2 June 2025 |
| 2 | 35 | 15 September 2025 | 1 June 2026 |

== Broadcast ==
=== International broadcast ===
In the United States, the series airs on Telemundo under the title Lejos de ti (Far from You), after acquiring the rights from Kanal D and Madd Entertainment to broadcast through the US Latin American market. The first season aired from 20 October 2025 to 11 February 2026. The second season premiered on 14 July 2026.

== Reception ==
The series has been one of the most-watched productions since its first day of broadcast. Particularly with its 15th episode, it has maintained its title as the most-watched series of the day and week, including reruns. With its 18th episode aired on 17 March 2025, it became the series with the highest ratings on Kanal D in the last 15 years.

In 2026, Uzak Şehir was named “TV Series of the Year” at the 11th Anadolu Media Awards, organized by the Turkish Press Federation.
