= Melike İlgün =

Turkish presenter, writer, journalist

Melike Bozok İlgün
- Born: Melike Bozok; June 23, 1974 (age 51)
- Citizenship: Turkey
- Education: İstiklal Makzume Anadolu Lisesi, İstanbul Üniversitesi
- Notable work: Bir Başvekil Sevdim

Melike Bozok İlgün (b. June 23, 1974) is a Turkish journalist, news anchor, and writer. She is known for her books such as Bir Başvekil Sevdim (English: I Fell in Love With a Prime Minister) and children's books such as Yasemin'in Gizemli Bahçesi (English: Yasemin's Mysterious Garden).

== Biography ==
İlgün grew up in Iskenderun, Turkey. She attended İstiklal Makzume Anatolian High School in İskenderun, and then she studied law at İstanbul University.

== Career ==
=== Journalism ===
İlgün began her career as a reporter for Kanal E, Kanal 6, Radikal Gazetesi, Kanal D, and Show TV. She presented the weekend news bulletin on Kanal 6 and her news show Melike İlgün ile Son Haber on Show TV. She also worked as an anchor and news editor at Kanaltürk for four years. She wrote columns for Gazeteport. She quit television and journalism in 2008.

=== Writing ===
Her first book, Kemal'e Eren Kadınlar, was published in February 2009. Her second book, Enver Paşa'nın Sultanı, was published in June 2011. Her third book, Bir Başvekil Sevdim, was published in June 2013. Her fourth book, Paramparça, was published in 2018, as well as her fifth book, Beni Hep Böyle Hatırla.

== Books ==
- Bir Başvekil Sevdim
- Paramparça
- Beni Hep Böyle Hatırla
- Kemale Eren Kadınlar
- Enver Paşa'nın Sultanı

=== Children's books ===
- Yasemin'in Gizli Bahçesi
