= Ali Sürmeli =

Turkish actor

- Born: 7 April 1959 (age 66); Solhan, Bingöl, Turkey
- Occupations: Theater and cinema actor
- Years active: 1983–present

Ali Sürmeli (born 7 April 1959) is a Turkish theatre and cinema actor of Zaza origin.

== Filmography ==
=== Film ===
- 1983: Beyaz Ölüm
- 1988: Dönüş
- 1988: Gece Dansı Tutsakları
- 1993: Hoş Memo
- 1993: Mavi Sürgün
- 1994: Babam Askerde
- 1995: Düş, Gerçek, Bir de Sinema
- 1995: Sokaktaki Adam
- 1996: Hayat Bazen Tatlıdır
- 1998: Kaçıklık Diploması
- 1998: Karışık Pizza
- 2000: Filler ve Çimen
- 2001: Şellale
- 2001: Son
- 2006: Eve Giden Yol
- 2006: Sınav
- 2006: Umut Adası
- 2007: Beyaz Melek
- 2007: Fırtına
- 2008: Girdap
- 2008: Hoşçakal Güzin
- 2009: Güneşi Gördüm
- 2009: Kolpaçino
- 2010: New York'ta Beş Minare
- 2010: Takiye:Allah Yolunda
- 2012: Açlığa Doymak
- 2012: Birses Böler Geceyi
- 2014: Mucize
- 2016: Babaların Babası
- 2017: Vezir Parmağı
- 2019: Hep Yek 3
- 2019: Mucize 2: Aşk
- 2021: Seni Bulacam Oğlum!
- 2022: Sivasliyih Gardas
- 2023: Prestij Meselesi

=== Television ===
- 1992: Umut Taksi
- 1994: Kurtuluş
- 1996: Olacak O Kadar
- 1999: Deli Yürek
- 2003: Hürrem Sultan
- 2003: Kasabanın İncisi
- 2004: Büyük Buluşma
- 2004: Şeytan Ayrıntıda Gizlidir
- 2005: Kin ve Gül
- 2006: Aşka Sürgün
- 2006: Yağmurdan Sonra
- 2007: Kuzey Rüzgarı
- 2007: Senin Uğruna
- 2008: Baba Ocağı
- 2009: Kurtlar Vadisi Pusu
- 2012: Kurt Kanunu
- 2014: Beyaz Karanfil
- 2018: Servet
- 2019: Çarpışma
- 2019: Çukur - guest appearance
- 2020: Eşkıya Dünyaya Hükümdar Olmaz
- 2023: Adım Farah
- 2024: Kuruluş: Osman
