= Selin Köseoğlu =

Turkish actress

- Born: Hatay, Turkey
- Education: Hacettepe University
- Occupation: Actress
- Years active: 2016–present
- Notable work: Siyah Beyaz Aşk

Selin Köseoğlu (born 1991, Hatay) is a Turkish actress.

== Career ==
Köseoğlu is known for her roles in various television series, such as Siyah Beyaz Aşk (2017) and Tek Yürek (2019). In 2022, she took part in the theatrical production İkinci Bahar, which was staged in many cities in Turkey, as one of the lead actors. In the same year, she took part in the series Berlin Çekirdekçisi, a show intended for the Turkish audience living in Germany. She has adapted the French singer Edith Piaf's songs from French to Turkish, and in the year 2023, she portrayed the artist in a solo performance titled Edith, which she wrote and directed.

== Biography ==
She pursued her secondary education at Istiklal Makzume Anatolian High School before enrolling in Hacettepe University for her college education. She pursued a major in Child Development and Psychology there before subsequently joining the acting program at the same university.

== Works ==
=== Plays ===
- Edith, 2021
- İkinci Bahar, 2022
- Bay Samir, 2024

=== Films ===
- Gittiler Şair ve Meçhul, 2014
- Name: Human, 2020

=== Television ===
- Unutma Beni, 2016, Ece
- Siyah Beyaz Aşk, 2017, Jülide
- Fi second season (Çi), 2017, Seçil
- Tek Yürek, 2019
- Berlin Çekirdekçisi, 2022
