= Güzin Çorağan =

Turkish actress (1943–2022)

Güzin Çorağan (29 October 1943, Bursa - 22 November 2022, Balıkesir) was a Turkish theater and cinema actress best known for her role as Ulrike/Ulviye, the wife of Davut in the long-running television series Bizimkiler.

== Early life and career ==
Güzin Çorağan began her theatrical career in 1962 at the Bursa Devlet Tiyatrosu (Bursa State Theater). Her film debut was in the 1986 film Asiye Nasıl Kurtulur?, directed by Atıf Yılmaz.

Çorağan was a member of Çağdaş Sinema Oyuncuları Derneği (the Contemporary Cinema Actors Association, ÇASOD), a non-governmental organisation based in Istanbul. She was actively involved in the contemporary Turkish cinema scene and was earned the award of Best Supporting Actress at the 12th Ankara International Film Festival for her role in the 1999 film Duruşma (The Trial).

She was married to the actor Tayfun Çorağan.

== Bizimkiler ==
Çorağan's most famous role was as Ulrike/Ulviye, the wife of German immigrant Davut in the television series Bizimkiler. The series, spanning 15 seasons and 459 episodes, remains one of Turkey's longest-running and beloved productions.

== Death ==
News of Güzin Çorağan's death was announced by fellow actor Zafer Algöz through his social media account. She died in her home district of Gömeç, Balıkesir Province at the age of 79, and was buried in her neighbourhood mosque.
