= Hürriyet Sırmaçek =

First female bridge engineer in Turkey

Hürriyet Sırmaçelik
- Born: 1912; Damascus, Ottoman Empire
- Died: 2 January 1983 (aged 70–71)
- Occupation: Turkey's first woman bridge engineer

Hürriyet Sırmaçek (1912 - 2 January 1983) was Turkey's first female bridge engineer.

== Early life ==
Hürriyet Sırmaçek was born in Damascus in 1912 when it was part of the Ottoman Empire. She graduated from Erenköy Girls High School in 1929, then attended Istanbul Technical University, graduating in 1935 with a specialisation in road and bridge engineering.

== Career ==
She worked as a senior engineer at various levels in the Turkish State Railways (TCDD). Roles included working as a control engineer for structural calculations, including concrete, at the Sivas Lokomotif and Wagon Factory. Other work included engineering the "T" deck beam supporting the Haydarpaşa overpass at the 71km mark on the Izmir-Manisa road. She calculated the requirements for the 2x45'lik steel truss bridge, the first such edifice in Turkey.

In 1964, Sırmaçek was appointed as a General Technical Consultant in the Directorate. She later served as Deputy General Director of the TCDD.

Between 1970 and 1971, she worked in the State Planning Organisation (DPT) on behalf of the Ministry of Transport, looking at transportation issues in preparation for the Southeast development plan.

Sırmaçek retired in 1971.

== Memberships ==
- Founder member of Türkiye Köprü ve İnşaat Cemiyeti - the Turkish Association for Bridge and Structural Engineering
- Türkiye Yüksek Mühendisler Birliği - Turkish Engineers Association - board member and General Secretary
- Soroptimist Clubs Association - chairman of Turkish branch
- Head of the Erenköy Girls' High School Alumni Association for 17 years
- Member of the Board of Directors of the Istanbul Chamber of Engineers, including a period as president of the organisation.

== Personal life ==
Hürriyet Sırmaçek died on 2 January 1983.
