= Bizimkiler =

Turkish television comedy, 1989 to 2002

- Genre: Family comedy
- Created by: Umur Bugay
- Directed by: Yalcin Yelence
- Starring: Erdal Özyağcılar; Ayşe Kökçü; Ercan Yazgan; Mehmet Akan; Atılay Uluışık; Uğurtan Sayıner
- Theme music composer: Arif Erkin
- Country of origin: Turkey
- Original language: Turkish
- No. of seasons: 15
- No. of episodes: 465

Production
- Producer: Bugay Yapım
- Production location: Istanbul

Original release
- Network: TRT 1; Star TV; Show TV
- Release: January 7, 1989 – October 27, 2002

Bizimkiler was a Turkish comedy, represented the lives of the people who shared the same neighborhood. It is also the name of musical project run by ANS TV.

The show is development of the movie Kapıcılar Kralı for which Umur Bugay who is the creator of the TV series, was the screenwriter.

It is one of the longest-running series in Turkish television drama history.

Due to lack of variety of television stations when series was first broadcast, the show attracted most of the audiences in Turkey and had huge cultural impact.

== Production ==
Yalcın Yelence has directed all of the episodes, besides the last 6 ones. Producer Umur Bugay was also the screenwriter for all episodes, later assisted by Sulhi Dölek

Series have been shot in Kadıköy, a district in Anatolian Side of Istanbul

== Broadcast history ==
Series have been broadcast on Sunday prime time in TRT 1 between 1987 and 1994, in Star TV between 1994 and 1999 and in Show TV between 1999 and 2002.

Re-run of the series have been broadcast irregularly both in various national and local television stations.

== Main cast ==
- Erdal Özyağcılar (1989–1997), Savaş Dinçel (1997–2002) as Şükrü Başaran
- Cihat Tamer (1989–1991), Engin Şenkan (1991–2002) as Şevket Başaran
- Ayşe Kökçü as Nazan Başaran
- Bensu Orhunöz as Bilge Başaran
- Atılay Uluışık as Ali Başaran
- Mehmet Akan as Sabri Dönmez
- Ercan Yazgan as Cafer Haktanır "Doorman"
- Salih Kalyon as Sedat "Knock Knock""
- Aykut Oray as Yavuz Korkmaz "Thug"
- Uğurtan Sayıner as Cemil "Drunk"
- Oktay Sözbir as Halil Arslan "Halil Marketing"
- Selçuk Uluergüven as Davut Öztürk
- Güzin Çorağan as the wife of Davut
- Ali Uyandıran as Halis Öztürk "Dummkopf"
- Savaş Yurttaş as Yengeç Hüseyin
