= Cool School Camp =

2008 Turkish comedy film

- Theatrical poster
- Directed by: Faruk Aksoy
- Written by: Faruk Aksoy; Şafak Güçlü; İrfan Saruhan
- Produced by: Faruk Aksoy; Ayşe Germen
- Starring: Paşhan Yılmazel; Alp Kırşan; Berksan; Simge Tertemiz
- Cinematography: Ertunç Şenkay
- Edited by: Erkan Özekan
- Production company: Aksoy Film
- Distributed by: Özen Film; Kinostar Filmverleih
- Release date: 11 January 2008
- Running time: 110 minutes
- Country: Turkey
- Language: Turkish
- Box office: US$5,493,587

Cool School Camp (Turkish: Çılgın Dersane Kampta) is a 2008 Turkish comedy film, directed by Faruk Aksoy, about a class of teenage students who take revenge on a rival who attempts to sabotage their unconventional school. The film, which went on nationwide general release across Turkey on 11 January 2008, was one of the highest-grossing Turkish films of 2008 and is a sequel to Cool School (2007).

== Plot ==
A villainous rival sends in four double agents to sabotage the exam preparations of the student body of Hadi Hodja's private education institute in a holiday village in Antalya. But when the students uncover the plot they take revenge.

== Cast ==
- Alp Kırşan as Bekir the Clumsy
- Okan Karacan as Dr. Bilgin
- Paşhan Yılmazel as Mojo
- Berksan as Berksan
- Simge Tertemiz as Ms. Leg
- Duygu Çetinkaya as Kurdela
- Sevil Uyar
- Ceyda Ateş
- Ozan Aydemir as Hasan the Trickster
- Mustafa Topaloğlu
- Cüneyt Arkın
- Sibel Tüzün

== Release ==
The film opened on general release in 213 screens across Turkey on 11 January 2008 at number one in the Turkish box office chart with an opening weekend gross of US$1,498,181.

International release
Date	Territory	Screens	Rank	Opening Weekend Gross	Total Gross
11 January 2008	Turkey	213	1	US$1,498,181	US$5,284,100
10 April 2008	Germany	35	26	US$63,812	US$140,115
11 April 2008	Austria	5	22	US$11,693	US$32,727
9 April 2008	Belgium	3	25	US$19,626	US$36,645

== Reception ==
The movie reached number one at the Turkish box office and was one of the highest grossing Turkish films of 2008 with a total gross of US$5,284,100.
