= The Waterfall (film) =

2001 film

- Theatrical poster
- Directed by: Semir Aslanyürek
- Written by: Semir Aslanyürek
- Produced by: Ezel Akay; Yalçın Kılıç
- Starring: Hülya Koçyiğit; Tuncel Kurtiz; Aykut Oray; Ali Sürmeli; Ege Aydan; Nurgül Yeşilçay
- Cinematography: Hayk Kirakosyan
- Edited by: Mustafa Presheva; Senad Presheva
- Music by: Sunay Özgür
- Release date: November 16, 2001
- Running time: 93 minutes
- Country: Turkey
- Language: Turkish

The Waterfall (Turkish: Şelale) is a 2001 Turkish comedy-drama film, written and directed by Semir Aslanyürek, about a famous painter returning to his hometown to remember his childhood in a politically divided home just before the 1960 military coup d'état. The film, which went on nationwide general release across Turkey on November 16, 2001, was described by author Rekin Teksoy as a "lively, fresh look at the director's childhood."

== Cast ==
- Hülya Koçyiğit as Semra
- Tuncel Kurtiz as Kel Selim
- Aykut Oray as Yusuf Usta
- Ali Sürmeli as Süleyman
- Ege Aydan as Sami
- Nurgül Yeşilçay as Nergis
- Enis Aslanyürek as Cemal
- Savaş Yurttaş as Münir Ağa
- Ezel Akay as Callud
- Zuhal Tatlıcıoğlu as Şehra
- Canan Hoşgör as Cemile
