= Sibel Tüzün =

Turkish singer, songwriter and composer (born 1971)

- Born: Ayşe Sibel Tüzün; 29 September 1971 (age 55); Istanbul, Turkey
- Genres: Pop; rock; jazz
- Occupations: Singer; songwriter; composer
- Years active: 1978–present
- Labels: Raks; Bay; Arinna; Avrupa; Ossi; DMC
- Website: Official website

Ayşe Sibel Tüzün (born 29 September 1971) is a Turkish singer, songwriter and composer.

== Life and career ==
Sibel began her musical education at the TRT Istanbul Children's Choir. During her secondary school years she joined the Youth Choir of TRT where she met Gökçen Koray, Cenan Akın and Hikmet Şimşek.

She showed an interest in pop and rock music during her years at Beşiktaş Atatürk Anadolu Lisesi, culminating in a third-place finish in a Song Contest among high-school students in Turkey.

In 1988, she enrolled in Istanbul University's famous Music Conservatory. In 1990, she entered Eurovizyon Şarkı Seçmeleri with the song Kime ne, to choose Turkey's song for Eurovision - She came 9th. In 1991, she decided to pursue a professional musical career, signing up with the Raks Müzik label.

Her first solo album Ah Biz Kızlar was released in 1992. The next year was spent on an exhaustive tour. After working with Robert Bricknell in London for a while, she returned to Turkey and released her second album, Nefes Keser Aşklar in 1995. This too was extremely successful, proving that her debut was no flash in the pan.

After completing a 1997 tour of Europe, Sibel started her own production company Arinna Muzik'. She produced her album Hayat Buysa Ben Yokum Bu Yolda ("If This Is Life, I'm Not In") end released it in 1998; it contained eight songs with lyrics written by Sibel. She scored a hit with "Yine Yalnızım" in 2001.

By 2003, she released her fifth album, Kırmızı (Red). Her sixth album, Kıpkırmızı (Crimson) which included Greek versions and remixes of songs of Kırmızı.

Sibel Tüzün represented Turkey at the Eurovision Song Contest 2006 which was held in Athens with the song Süper Star (Superstar). She also recorded English and Greek versions of the song.

In 2010, Tuzun returned with the album Saten, in which every song on the EP had a music video made for it. In support of the Saten album, Tuzun performed a tour throughout Turkey, and eastern Europe.

== Discography ==
=== Albums ===
- Ah Biz Kızlar (Oh, We Girls) (1992)
- Nefes Keser Aşklar (Breath-Taking Loves) (1995)
- Hayat Buysa Ben Yokum Bu Yolda (If This is Life, I'm Not In) (1998)
- Yine Yalnızım (I'm Alone Again) (2001)
- Kırmızı (Red) (2003)
- Kıpkırmızı (Crimson red) (2004)
- Saten (Satin) (2010)
- Kaç Yıl Geçti Aradan (How Many Years Gone With The Break) (2014)
- Le Le Le (2015)

Compilations

- 2000 Şarkılar Bir Oyundur / Duyuyor musun?
- 2008 Zilli Perküsyon /Kaçın Kurası
- 2008 Çılgın Dersane Kampta Soundtrack /Gözyaşındayım
- 2010 Şimdi 90'lar /Kaçın Kurası
- 2011 Eelence /Kaçın Kurası
- 2011 EnIstanbul / Birakma Beni
- 2014 Sabahlar Olmasson / Hani Söz Vermiştin İçmeyecektin feat. Mustafa Avkıran
- 2017 Sevgiliye Aşk Şarkıları/Gözümün Bebeği

=== Singles ===
- Seviyorum Seveceğim (I Love and Will Love) (2005)
- Süper Star (2006)
- Aç Telefonu (Answer the Phone) (2008)
- Yaz Aşkı (Summer Love) (2008)
- Kaç Yıl Geçti Aradan (How Many Years Gone With The Break) (2014)
- Le Le Le (2014)
- Aşk Bize Yeter (Love Enough for Us) (Featuring İskender Paydaş) (2015)
- Senden İmzalı (Sealed by You) (2017)
- Anlamadın Di Mi? (Didn't You Understand?) (2018)
- Olaylara Gel (2019)

== Filmography ==
- 2007: Çılgın Dersane Kampta
- 2012: Survivor Ünlüler-Gönüllüler (Contest/Show TV)

== See also ==
- Music of Turkey
- List of Turkish pop music performers
