= Neriman Elgin =

Turkish politician (1921–1994)

Member of the 17th Parliament for Ankara
- In office 24 November 1983 – 16 October 1987

Personal details
- Born: Neriman; 1921 Malatya, Turkey
- Died: 11 March 1994 (aged 72–73)
- Party: Populist Party (HP)
- Other political affiliations: Social Democratic Populist Party (SHP)
- Spouse: İsmet Elgin (1904–1976)
- Children: 4
- Occupation: Politician

Neriman Elgin (1921 – 11 March 1994) was a Turkish politician. She served one term in the parliament.

== Politician career ==
Elgin served in Ankara as the Deputy Chairperson of the Municipal council between 1973 and 1980. In 1983, she co-founded Populist Party (Turkish: Halkçı Parti, HP), a descendant of the Republican People's Party (CHP), which was banned after the 1980 coup d'état. She ran for the Deputy of Ankara in the 1983 general election. She entered the Grand National Assembly of Turkey, and served in the 17th Parliament. In 1985, the Populist Party merged with the Social Democracy Party (SODEP) forming the Social Democratic Populist Party (SHP). She was a member of the parliamentary foreign affairs commission.

== Personal life ==
Neriman was born to Talat and Macide in Malatya, Turkey in 1921. She completed her education at Erenköy Girls High School in Istanbul.

She marriad to author İsmet Elgin (1904–1976), and gave birth to four children.

Neriman Elgin died on 11 March 1994.
