= Tuğba Melis Türk =

Turkish actress and model

- Born: 7 September 1990 (age 34); Sofia, Bulgaria
- Education: Istanbul Aydın University-Acting
- Awards: Best Model of Turkey (2011)

Tuğba Melis Türk (born 7 September 1990) is a Turkish actress and model. She came first at the Best Model of Turkey contest in 2011.

== Filmography ==
Year	Title	Role	Notes
2019	Hayatta Olmaz		
2017	Tutsak	Nazlı	
2017	Fazilet Hanım ve Kızları	Nil	
2016	Muhteşem Yüzyıl: Kösem	Katherina	
2015	Kaçak	Zeynep	(last episode)
2014	Şimdi Onlar Düşünsün	Özge	(4–7th episode)
2013 2014	Merhamet	Melike	
2014	Hatasız Kul Olmaz	Duygu	
2014	Sana Bir Sır Vereceğim	Deniz	
2013	Leyla ile Mecnun	Peri Kızı	Taş Bebek
2012 2013	Krem	şelale	
2011	Kolpaçino: Bomba		
2010	Cehennem 3D		
2008	Sevgili Düşmanım	Ezgi	
2007	Annem	Başak	
2007	Senin Uğruna	Emel	
2006	Arka Sokaklar	Nesrin	
2004	Büyük Buluşma	Yasemin	
2012	Adını Feriha Koydum	Rüya Çelik	guest act
2012	Bitmesin		
	Kara Ekmek	Canan	guest act

13.10.2010 - 29.06.2011

"Unutulmaz" - "Незабравима" Ermak
