= Ercan Yazgan =

Turkish comedian and political satirist

- Born: 4 April 1946; Sinop, Turkey
- Died: 8 March 2018 (aged 71); Sultanbeyli, Istanbul, Turkey
- Resting place: Karacaahmet Cemetery
- Occupations: Actor, comedian

Ercan Yazgan (4 April 1946 – 8 March 2018) was a Turkish comedian and political satirist. He was widely regarded as one of Turkey's most prominent and respected comedians. He starred in numerous movies and various TV-series. He died on 8 March 2018, at the age of 71, from multiple organ failure.

== Filmography ==
- Bana Masal Anlatma - 2015
- İffet - 2011
- Kardelen - 2010
- Hanımın Çiftliği - 2010
- Nekrüt - 2008
- Yalancı Yarim - 2007
- Ahh İstanbul - 2006
- Tatil Aşkları - 2004
- Altın Kafes - 2004
- Hayat Bilgisi - 2003
- Sırlar Dünyası / Sır Kapısı - 2002
- Aşk Meydan Savaşı - 2002
- Balalayka - 2000
- Duruşma - 1999
- Sevda Kondu - 1996
- Kaygısızlar - 1994
- Yazlıkçılar - 1993
- Bir Milyara Bir Çocuk - 1990
- Bizimkiler - 1989
- Kabadayı - 1986
- Perihan Abla - 1986
- Üç İstanbul - 1983
- Arkadaşım - 1982
- Dokunmayın Şabanıma - 1979
- Ölüm Görevi - 1978
- Sen Aşk Nedir Bilir Misin - 1977
- Sarmaş Dolaş - 1977
- Tatlı Kaçık - 1977
- İzin - 1975
- Hüdaverdi-Pırtık - 1971
- Susuz Yaz - 1963
