= Faik Ergin =

Turkish actor and model

Faik Ergin (born 16 February 1978, İskenderun), is a Turkish actor and model, who won the Turkish contests Best Model of Turkey and Best Model of World in 2000. He completed his secondary education at İskenderun İstiklal Makzume Anatolian High School and holds a Bachelor of Science degree in Civil Engineering from Istanbul Technical University.

== Performances ==
Faik Ergin has been acting for over 14 years in theatre, television, and movies. Since January 2014, Ergin began working on Küçük Ağa. He plays the role of Doctor Yusuf.

=== Theatre ===
- Ayışığı Tarifesi

=== Movies ===
- Aşk Nerede (2015)
- Şarkıcı (2001)

=== Television ===
- Küçük Ağa (Yusuf); 2014
- Galip Derviş (Ali "Topan" Sönmezoğlu); 2013
- Uygun Adım Aşk (Tayfun)
- Genco (Tibet); 2007
- Öteki Oğul (Sadık)
- Sakın Söyleme (İsmail)
- Hacı (Deniz)
- İffet (Sinan)
- Gümüş (Berk)
- Fosforlu Cevriye
