= Tuba Ünsal =

Turkish actress and model

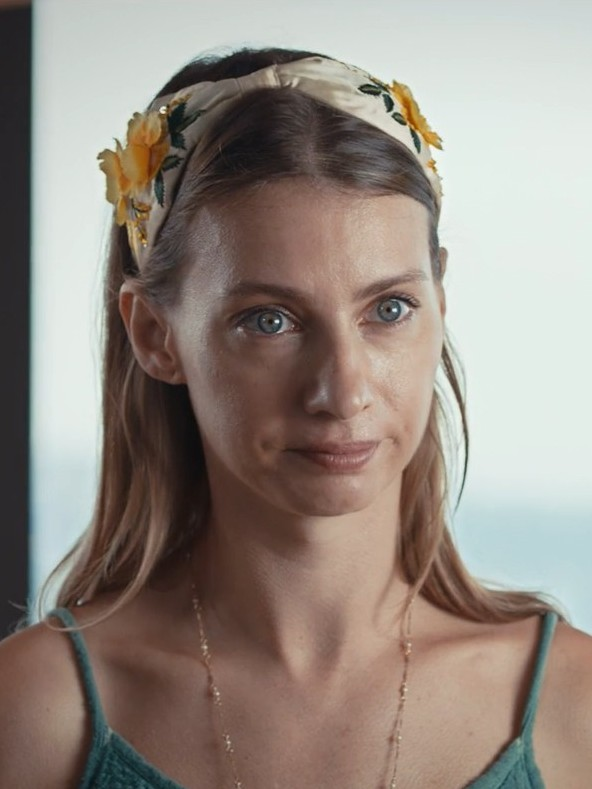
- Ünsal in 2017
- Born: 7 December 1981 (age 44); Denizli, Turkey
- Education: Istanbul Bilgi University
- Occupations: Actress, model
- Years active: 1992–present
- Spouses: Cem Cantaş (m. 2004; div. 2006) Murat Pilevneli (m. 2010; div. 2012) Mirgün Cabas (m. 2013; div. 2018)
- Children: 2

Tuba Ünsal (born 7 December 1981) is a Turkish actress and model.

== Biography ==
Tuba Ünsal was born in Denizli on 7 December 1981. Her paternal family, who are of Turkish origin, emigrated from Greece. One part of her maternal family is Oghuz Turk immigrant from Bulgaria and the other part is Kazan Tatar, which is a Turkic subgroup immigrated from Romania. She studied business administration in Çanakkale Onsekiz Mart University. Ünsal graduated from the photography and video department of Istanbul Bilgi University.

She began her modelling career by contesting in the 1998 Elite Model look. She was featured in a variety of commercials and advertising campaigns before pursuing a career in acting. She is also producer of theatre and films.

Among her notable franchise film roles are Tuba Sernikli in the 2004 comedy-dramas Vizontele Tuuba, Derya in Dünyanın En Güzel Kokusu, in Küçük Hanımefendi based on classic novel, Özlem in Çılgın Dersane and Sinem in Çakallarla Dans. Ünsal was also cast in the 2008 film A Beautiful Life.

Since her debut, she has acted in numerous television series, including Yemin, Yeniden Çalıkuşu, Mahallenin Muhtarları, Ruhsar, Kara Melek, Çarli İş Başında, İçerde. Her period series are Bu Kalp Seni Unutur mu, Mor Menekşeler, Karaoğlan, Öyle Bir Geçer Zaman ki, and Aşk 101.

== Filmography ==
Film
Year	Title	Role	Notes
2000	Kırık Kalpler		Tv film
2002	Kolay Para Kazanma Kılavuzu	Sanem	
2002	Mumya Firarda		
2002	Vizontele Tuuba	Tuba Sernikli	
2004	Hızlı Adımlar	Sadenaz	
2006	Küçük Hanımefendi	Ceren	Tv film
2006	Küçük Hanımefendinin Şoförü	Ceren	Tv film
2007	Küçük Hanım Kar Tanesi	Cansu Ergüven	Tv film
2007	Çocuk	Rüya	
2007	Çılgın Dersane	Özlem	
2008	A Beautiful Life	Sadenaz	
2008	Plajda	Zeynep Nehir	
2009	Suluboya		
2009	Türkler Çıldırmış Olmalı: Görev Afrika	Tuğçe	
2010	Çakallarla Dans	Sinem	
2011	Beni Unutma	Ebru	
2012	Old Clock	Annie	Short film
2015	Dünyanın En Güzel Kokusu	Derya	
2017	Dünyanın En Güzel Kokusu 2	Derya	
2020	Masallardan Geriye Kalan	Asya	
2022	Sadece Bir Gece	Begüm	
2022	Aşkın Ömrü	Selen	

Television
Year	Title	Role	Notes
1992	Mahallenin Muhtarları	Young girl	
1996	Kırık Hayatlar		
1997	Ruhsar	Eylem	
1998	Kara Melek	Funda	
1998	Kırık Hayatlar		
1999	Ayşecik		
1999	Kurt Kapanı	Elmas	
1999	Kıvılcım	Pelin	
2000	Çarli İş Başında	Young girl	
2001	Savunma		
2002	Karaoğlan	Bayırgülü	
2004	Ruhun Duymaz	Feray	
2005	Seni Çok Özledim	Berfin	
2005	Yeniden Çalıkuşu	Çalıkuşu Handan	
2006	Ümit Millî	Tuba	
2007	Yemin	Leyla	
2009	Bu Kalp Seni Unutur Mu?	Gülümsün Peker Doğan	
2009	Canını Sevdiğim İstanbul'u	Sub-Inspector Oya Çakır	
2011	Mor Menekşeler		
2011	Tövbeler Tövbesi	Pelin	
2013	Öyle Bir Geçer Zaman Ki	Filiz	
2013	Bebek İşi		
2014	Ruhumun Aynası	Elçin	
2017	İçerde	Handan	
2020–2021	Aşk 101	Eda (adult)	
2022–2023	Gecenin Ucunda	Nermin Işık	
2024	Mehmed: Fetihler Sultanı	Mara Branković	
