= Ozan Akbaba =

Turkish actor (born 1982)

- Born: 9 June 1982 (age 44); Kars, Turkey
- Occupation: Actor
- Years active: 2005–present
- Spouse: Elif Buket Arıkan (m. 2017)
- Children: 1

Ozan Akbaba (born 9 June 1982) is a Turkish actor.

Akbaba was born in 1982 in Kars, Turkey. He graduated at Akdeniz University School of Fine Arts with a degree in Interior Architecture and Environmental Design. Aside from his career as an actor, he has composed scores for a number of movies as well. In 2014, he appeared in the music video for Sıla's song "Vaziyetler". Between 2015 and 2021, he played in the ATV's Eşkıya Dünyaya Hükümdar Olmaz, portraying the character of İlyas Çakırbeyli. He had leading role in medical series "Kasaba Doktoru".

== Filmography ==
=== Film ===
- ANKA - Murat
- Aman Reis Duymasın - İlyas Çakırbeyli
- Abluka (film)|Abluka - Ali
- Mutlak Adalet - Metin
- Krallar Kulübü
- Kadir ve Kardeşleri - Ali
- Ammar: Cin tarikatı - Kemal
- Sürgün İnek - Selçuk
- Yarım Kalan Mucize - Ruhi Su
- Bir Hikayem Var - Hasan

=== Short film ===
- Bumerang - 2010
- Çatallı Katil
- Heksek
- Karartma
- Kötülük
- Emanet
- Son Sevişme
- Hesaplaşma

=== Television ===
- Uzak Şehir 2024- (Cihan Albora)
- Ben Bu Cihana Sığmazam - 2023- (Gardaşov)
- Kasaba Doktoru - 2022–2023 (Hakan Aydıner/Kemal Demir)
- EDHO - 2015–2022 (İlyas Çakırbeyli)
- Güldür Güldür (Şenol)
- Serçe Sarayı - 2015 (Ramazan)
- Poyraz Karayel - 2015 (Taner)
- Arka Sokaklar -2014 (Doktor Veysel)
- Kuzey Güney - 2012–2013 (Sümer Tezkan)
- Cennetin Sırları - 2011 (Zafer)
- Kavak Yelleri - 2007
- Kırık Kanatlar - 2005

== Theatre ==
- Arafta Kalanlar
- Gölgeden Işığa Karagöz
- Topuzlu
- Kadınlar da Savaşı Yitirdi
- Ali Ayşe'yi Seviyo
- The Comedy of Errors
- Othello
- Ramazan Eğlence ve Animasyonları
- Margret Kısa filmi Çöplükteki Ayı
- Diş Çürükleri Kırallığı
- Çocuk Parkı
- Yollu
- İnternetten Tanışan Son Çift
