= Cihat Tamer =

Turkish actor

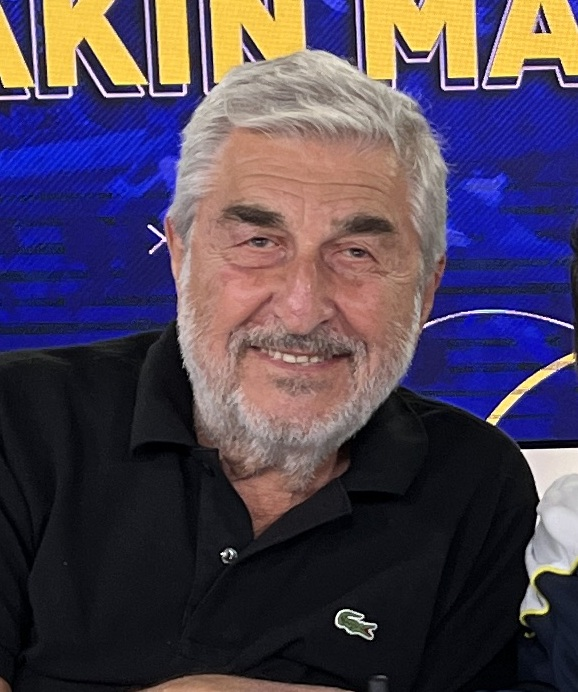
- Born: Ahmet Cihat Tamer; 26 February 1943 (age 83); Istanbul, Turkey
- Education: Güzel Sanatlar Üniversitesi, Istanbul
- Occupation: Actor

Cihat Tamer (born 26 February 1943) is a Turkish actor. He is known for his roles in TV productions such as Bizimkiler, theatrical productions such as Yasaklar, and various films.

== Career ==
He began his stage career as an amateur at the Bakırköy Halkevi in Istanbul in 1959 and became a professional actor in 1961 with the Münir Özkul Theater. Over the following decades he worked with a number of important theater companies, including Bulvar Theater, Üç Maymun Kabare, Devekuşu Kabare and Dostlar Theater, and also formed a theater with fellow actor Ercan Yazgan. He appeared in numerous Turkish films such as Güneşi Gördüm, Beyaz Melek and Bir Yudum Sevgi, and in popular television series including Perihan Abla, Bizimkiler and Mahallenin Muhtarları. Tamer has also directed stage productions and taught acting. Throughout his career he was associated with both traditional theater and cabaret, contributing to Turkey’s performing arts scene from the 1960s onward.

== Personal life ==
In 2024 Tamer lost his son Atilla Tamer.
