= Melahat Ruacan =

Turkish high court judge

- Born: Melahat Senger; 1906; Istanbul, Ottoman Empire
- Died: 1974 (aged 67–68); Ankara, Turkey
- Education: Erenköy Girls High School
- Alma mater: Istanbul University; Ankara University, Law School
- Occupation: Judge
- Known for: First female supreme court judge
- Children: 1, Şevket Ruacan

Melahat Senger-Ruacan (1906–1974) was a female Turkish high court judge and the first woman elected to any supreme court in the world.

== Early life ==
The first child of Col. Nuri and his wife Güzide, she attended Erenköy Girls High School (Turkish: Erenköy Kız Lisesi), an exclusive lycée in Istanbul, and later studied philosophy at Istanbul University. Following Mustafa Kemal Atatürk's establishment of Ankara as the capital of the Turkish Republic, a new university was founded in the city. Melahat Senger moved to the new capital to attend the Faculty of Law at Ankara University from 1925 to 1929 and finished her studies as the first female graduate of this new school with high honors. In 1938, she married Asım Ruacan, a colleague in law, and had one son with him.

== Career and later life ==
She worked as a judge throughout Turkey, and in 1945, she was appointed to the Turkish Supreme Court of Appeals (Yargıtay) as its first female member. She decided many crucial cases. During the politically turbulent years of the Democrat Party administration (1950–1960) in Turkey, she was put in a politically-motivated forced retirement. She successfully challenged said retirement in court, and was reinstated to the appellant bench in 1963 with full honors and compensation.

Judge Ruacan was a prominent advocate of women's rights during her tenure as a judge, following Atatürk's Kemalist ideology throughout her life.

She died of a heart attack in Ankara, Turkey, in 1974.
