= Sulhi Dölek =

Sulhi Dölek (20 September 1948 – 7 November 2005) was a Turkish writer, satirist, mechanical engineer and navy officer.

== Biography ==
Sulhi Dölek was born in Istanbul on 20 September 1948. He joined the Turkish Navy and studied in the Naval Academy. For further studies, he went to the United States. He studied mechanical engineering and marine engineering at Michigan University. He resigned from the Navy in 1988 in the rank of a Commander, and continued as a writer. He died on 7 November 2005 due to a cerebral infraction.

Even before his retirement, some of his short stories were published in the satirical magazine Akbaba. He also wrote in the dailies Milliyet and Cumhuriyet.

== Works ==
Below are his boks:

=== Novels ===
- 1975: Korugan ("Hangar")
- 1981: Geç Başlayan Yargılama ("A Delayed Trial" )
- 1982: Kiracı ("Tenant")
- 1988: Teslim ol Küçük ("Surrender, the Little One")
- 1991: Truva Katırı (The Mule of Troy)
- 1997: Kirpi ("Hedgehog")

=== Short story books ===
- 1983: Vidalar ("The Screws")
- 1994: Aynalar ("The Mirrors")

=== Essays and research books ===
- 1983: Yergi Nükte ve Fıkralarıyla Yusuf Ziya Ortaç ("Yusuf Ziya Ortaç with his Satires Epigram and Anectodes")
- 1990: Balığın şarkısı ("The song of the Fish")
- 1990: İçimizdeki Yasakçı ("The Forbidder Inside Us")
- 1997: Habis’in Serüvenleri ("The Adventures of the Hangdog")

He also wrote a number of children's books.

== TV and drama ==
- Dünya Dönüyor ("The World Rotates")
- Süper Baba ("The Super Father")
- Külyutmaz ("The Cunning")
- İkinci Bahar ("Second Spring")
- Kirpi ("The Hedgehog")
