= Tuğçe Güder =

Sudanese-born Turkish model

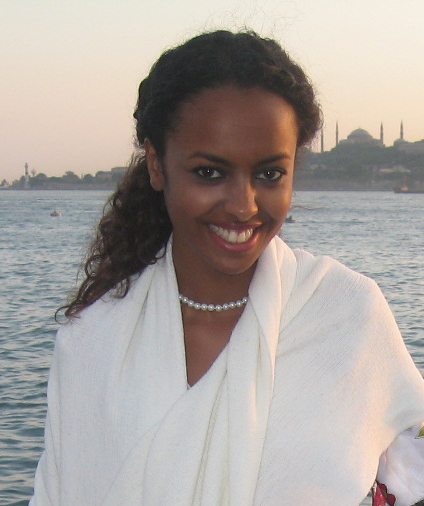
Tuğçe Güder

Tuğçe Güder is a Sudanese-born Turkish model who was chosen as the Best Model of Turkey, an international annual competition, in 2005 and represented Turkey at the Best Model of the World modelling pageant.

== Personal life ==
Tuğçe was born to Sudanese parents, and was adopted as a baby by Turkish parents. She married restaurant owner Uğur Karas in 2008. Among the many charitable works, she is involved in raising awareness for helping neglected children.
