= Turgut Özakman =

Turkish writer (1930–2013)

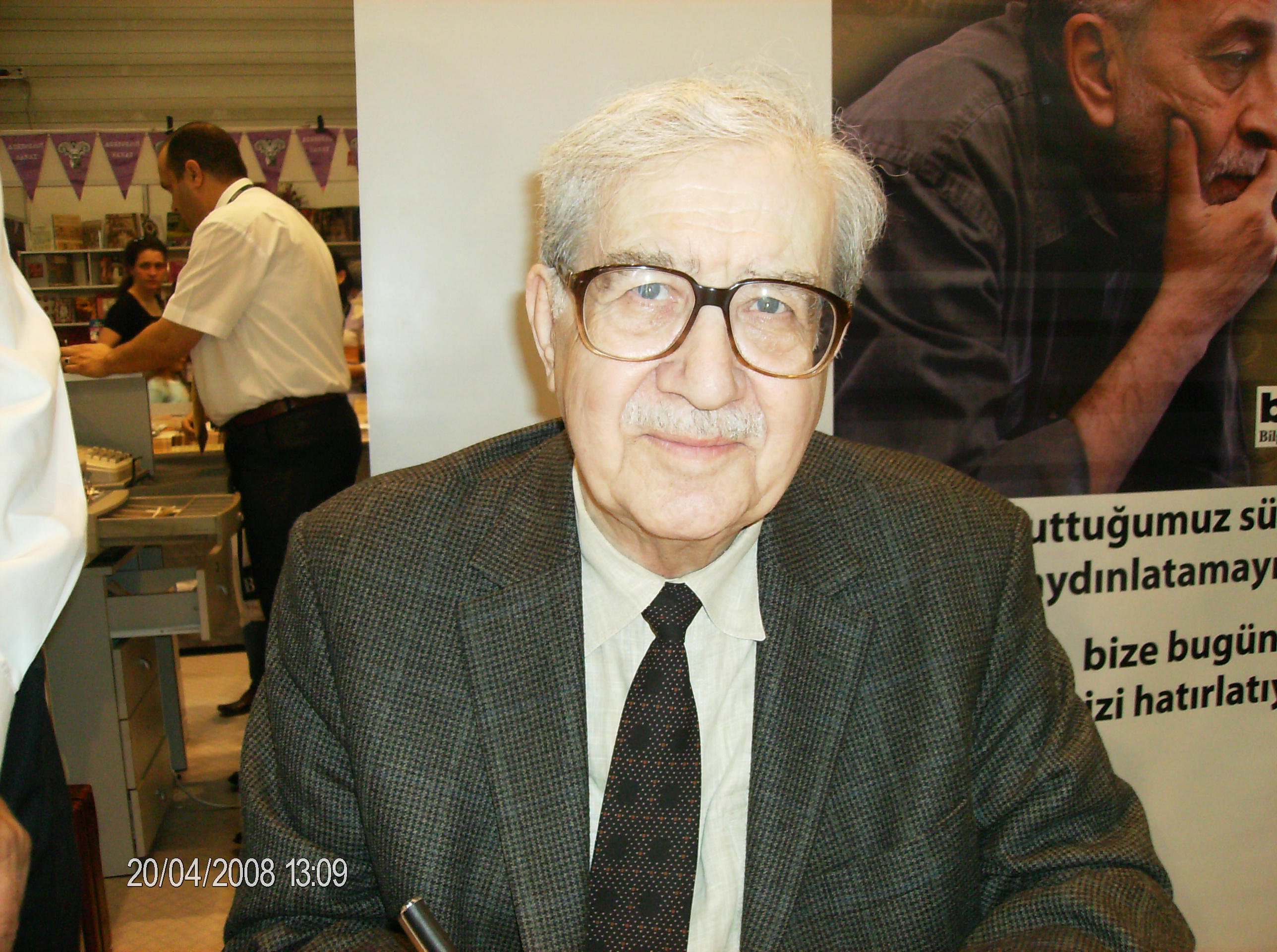
- Özakman in 2008
- Born: 1 September 1930; Ankara, Turkey
- Died: 28 September 2013 (aged 83); Ankara, Turkey
- Occupations: Civil servant, writer, dramaturge
- Writing career
- Language: Turkish
- Notable work: Turkey Triplet

Turgut Özakman (1 September 1930 – 28 September 2013) was a Turkish lawyer, a civil servant, a dramaturge and a writer.

== Life ==
He was born in Ankara in 1930. In 1952 he graduated from the law school of Ankara University and served as a lawyer. After studying drama in the University of Cologne, he was appointed as a dramaturge in state theatre of Ankara (Turkish: Ankara Devlet Tiyatrosu). Later he also served in the Turkish Radio and Television Corporation (TRT) as a manager. Between 1983 and 1987 he was the general director in State Theatres. Between 1984 and 1994 he was the vice chairman of Radio and Television Supreme Council (RTÜK).

== Works ==
As a writer he produced many plays, novels, scenarios and drama researches. But his most notable works are three novels which are collectively known as Türkiye Üçlemesi ("Turkey Triplet")

- Şu Çılgın Türkler (These Crazy Turks) about Turkish War of Independence (published in 2005)
- Diriliş Çanakkale 1915 (Resuscitation, Çanakkale 1915) about the Gallipoli Campaign (published in 2008)
- Cumhuriyet Türk Mucizesi (Republic, a Turkish Miracle) about the foundation of Republican Turkey (published in 2009)

These novels (all more than 600 pages) are semi documentaries with sources, maps and archive photos. But, to ease the reading, a story of romance has been added to convert them to novels. Among them Şu Çılgın Türkler broke the sales records in Turkey in 2005. Up to 2013 there have been 311 impressions.

== Death ==
He died on 28 September 2013 in Ankara He was buried in Karşıyaka Cemetery in Ankara. He was survived by three children.

== Legacy ==
In 1999 he was awarded by the Presidency. In 2002 Eskişehir municipality named one of the public theaters in Eskişehir "Turgut Özakman stage". After 2006, Middle East Technical University, Süleyman Demirel University and Marmara University awarded Özakman.
