= Simge Tertemiz =

- Born: 9 September 1988 (age 38); İskenderun, Turkey
- Height: 1.78 m (5 ft 10 in)
- Spouse: Murat Kadıoğlu (m. 2011; div. 2014)
- Children: 1
- Beauty pageant titleholder
- Title: Best Model of Turkey 2002

Simge Tertemiz (born 9 September 1988) is a Turkish model, actress and television hostess.

== Life and career ==
Simge was born in the city of İskenderun in southeastern Turkey, and is one of 3 children. She studied at Yahya Kemal Beyatlı Primary School and Nuri Cıngıllıoğlu High School. At the moment she is studying Economics and Industry Relations at Anadolu University (Eskişehir). She was the winner at the 2002 "Best Model of Turkey" and fourth at 2004 "Best Model of The World" modeling pageants. She has acted as Gamze in the "Çılgın Dersane" movies, and in "Mert İle Gert" on TRT 1 (Turkish national network). She was voted as the sexiest woman in Turkey of 2011 by Boxer Magazine, the country's most widely read men's magazine.
