= Çoban Yıldızı =

Song by Timur Selçuk
- Released: 1975
- Genre: Instrumental
- Length: 3:12
- Composer(s): Melih Kibar

Çoban Yıldızı is an instrumental Turkish melody composed by Melih Kibar in 1975.

In 1975, TRT, the Turkish Radio and Television Corporation ordered a jingle for the coming Eurovision Song contest national finals. (see Turkey in the Eurovision Song Contest 1975). Melih Kibar then working with Timur Selçuk composed the melody and named it Çoban Yıldızı. (In Turkish, Çoban Yıldızı means "shepherd's star" and it actually refers to the planet Venus). He submitted his composition to Timur Selçuk who arranged the melody and played it during the national contest. In an interview Melih Kibar said that during the first performance of the melody he was studying for his university finals. The melody quickly gained popularity; the Selçuk performance was popularly taken as that of a contestant on the show. The song being an instrumental prohibited it from contestant performance. In the following years TRT used this jingle for the Eurovision national contests. The melody was included in Melih's album Yadigar in 2001.
