= Melahat Okuyan =

Turkish physician (1924–2025)

Prof. Dr. Melahat Okuyan
- Born: 1924; Diyarbakır, Turkey
- Died: 14 August 2025 (aged 101)
- Education: Veterinary medicine, Microbiology
- Alma mater: Ankara University Faculty of Veterinary; University of Maryland School of Medicine; University of Cambridge
- Scientific career
- Fields: Veterinary medicine, virology, microbiology
- Workplaces: Hacettepe University; Dokuz Eylül University

Melahat Okuyan (1924 – 14 August 2025) was a Turkish veterinary physician, academic and scientist in microbiology. She was also an HIV/AIDS activist.

== Background ==
Melahat Okuyan was born in Diyarbakır, southeastern Turkey in 1924. She was schooled at the age of five and half. Okuyan was married and had two children, a son and a daughter. She died on 14 August 2025, at the age of 101.

== Career ==
Okuyan graduated from the Faculty of Veterinary medicine at Ankara University, ranking first in the academic term in 1946. She then worked four years as an assistant at the Institute for Veterinary Bacteriology and Serology in Pendik, Istanbul.

In 1950, she went to the United States, where she obtained a Master of Science degree in General microbiology in 1952 from the University of Maryland School of Medicine. Returned home, she worked in the Institute for Veterinary Control and Research in Bornova, İzmir as chief of laboratory for diagnosis and research (1952–54), when she obtained a diploma, becoming an expert in Bacteriology and Epizootiology. She then served as chief of laboratories at the Central Anatolia Institute for Veterinary Vaccine and Serum in Konya (1954–1956).

Receiving a research scholarship from the British Cultural Centre, she conducted studies as a fellow on Veterinary virology at the University of Cambridge, England between 1956 and 1957. Her next posts were research organizer and department manager of foreign relations at the Veterinary Affairs Directorate of the Ministry of Agriculture in 1958, and expert for Epizootic at the Office of Veterinary in Ankara (1960–1961).

In the next two years, Okuyan set up a laboratory for oncovirus study and conducted research at the National Institutes of Health sponsored by the American Institute for Cancer Research. She returned to Turkey in 1964, where she was appointed a lecturer and researcher at the Hacettepe University Medical School.

She set up a laboratory for oncovirus research and conducted research mostly on virology and bacteriology. She obtained a Doctor of Science degree at the same university in 1966, and became Associate professor by November 1970. She was later appointed full professor of Microbiology at the Faculty of Medicine of Dokuz Eylül University in İzmir, where she served eleven years from 1980 until her retirement in 1991.

== HIV/AIDS activist ==
Okuyan pioneered the establishment of a Center for Information on AIDS and HIV Test (Turkish: AIDS Danışma ve Doğrulama Merkezi) in 1986. The next year, she became a member of the National AIDS Commission. In 1991, she formed, along with a group of volunteers, the Association for the Fight Against AIDS (Turkish: AİDS ile Mücadele Derneği) in İzmir. Committed to spread awareness about AIDS, the group developed projects and opened branches in various cities in Turkey. She became the chairperson of the organization.

In 1993, the association gained the status of a nonprofit organization by a governmental decree. She personally performed HIV testing anonymously to detect human immunodeficiency virus (HIV), the virus that causes acquired immunodeficiency syndrome (AIDS).

In 2004, she proposed the establishment of male brothels for homosexuals and cross-dressers in order to improve public health, as HIV is also transmitted by sexual contact. Just as sex workers in brothels in Turkey are subject to regular health checks, Okuyan wanted homosexuals and transvestites to have access to similar examinations.

In 2006, she and her associates founded clubs for Fight Against Drugs and AIDS (Turkish: Uyuşturucu ve AIDS ile Mücadele) (UYAD) in İzmir, Istanbul, and Diyarbakır as part of a Peer Education Project (Turkish: Akran Eğitimi Projesi). In 2008, she reported that there were 2,920 people with AIDS in Turkey as of 2007, including 2,028 males and 892 females.

In 2009, they introduced the project to 25 schools in İzmir. The organization could not receive any financial support from the local administration, and faced problems with fundraising as donors were reluctant to be named. This led to the closure of the association in 2010. At age 85, Okuyan was still giving support and advice on AIDS over the internet and social media.
