= Cool School (2007 film) =

- Theatrical poster
- Directed by: Faruk Aksoy
- Written by: Şafak Güçlü; İrfan Saruhan
- Produced by: Faruk Aksoy; Ayşe Germen
- Starring: Cüneyt Arkın; Yagmur Atacan; Duygu Cetinkaya; Tuba Ünsal; Mustafa Topaloglu; Hande Ataizi
- Cinematography: Adnan İşbilir
- Edited by: Cem Yıldırım
- Music by: Uğurcan Sezen; Oğuz Kaplangı
- Production company: Aksoy Film
- Distributed by: Warner Bros. Maxximum Film
- Release date: 26 January 2007
- Running time: 117 minutes
- Country: Turkey
- Language: Turkish
- Box office: US$4,409,042

Cool School (Turkish: Çılgın Dersane) is a 2007 Turkish comedy film, directed by Faruk Aksoy, about a class of teenage students attempting to save their unconventional school from closure. The film, which went on nationwide general release across Turkey on 26 January 2007, was one of the highest-grossing Turkish films of 2007 and was followed by Cool School Camp (2008).

== Plot ==
A private education institute on the edge of bankruptcy is about to be closed down. An initially reluctant student body, lured to the institute by the promise of learning in a holiday village, join the staff to stop the closure by entering an inter-school contest in the hope of winning first place and the money to save their school.

== Production ==
The film was shot on location in Antalya, Turkey.

== Release ==
The film opened on general release in 149 screens across Turkey on 26 January 2007 at number two in the Turkish box office chart with an opening weekend gross of US$694,626.

== Reception ==
The film was number one at the Turkish box office for two weeks running and was one of the highest grossing Turkish films of 2007 with a total gross of US$4,265,287.

International gross
Date	Territory	Screens	Rank	Opening Weekend	Total Gross
26 January 2007	Turkey	149	2	US$694,626	US$4,265,287
15 March 2007	Germany	5	-	US$1,776	US$116,915
16 March 2007	Austria	2	35	US$301	US$26,840
