= Jehan Barbur =

Turkish singer

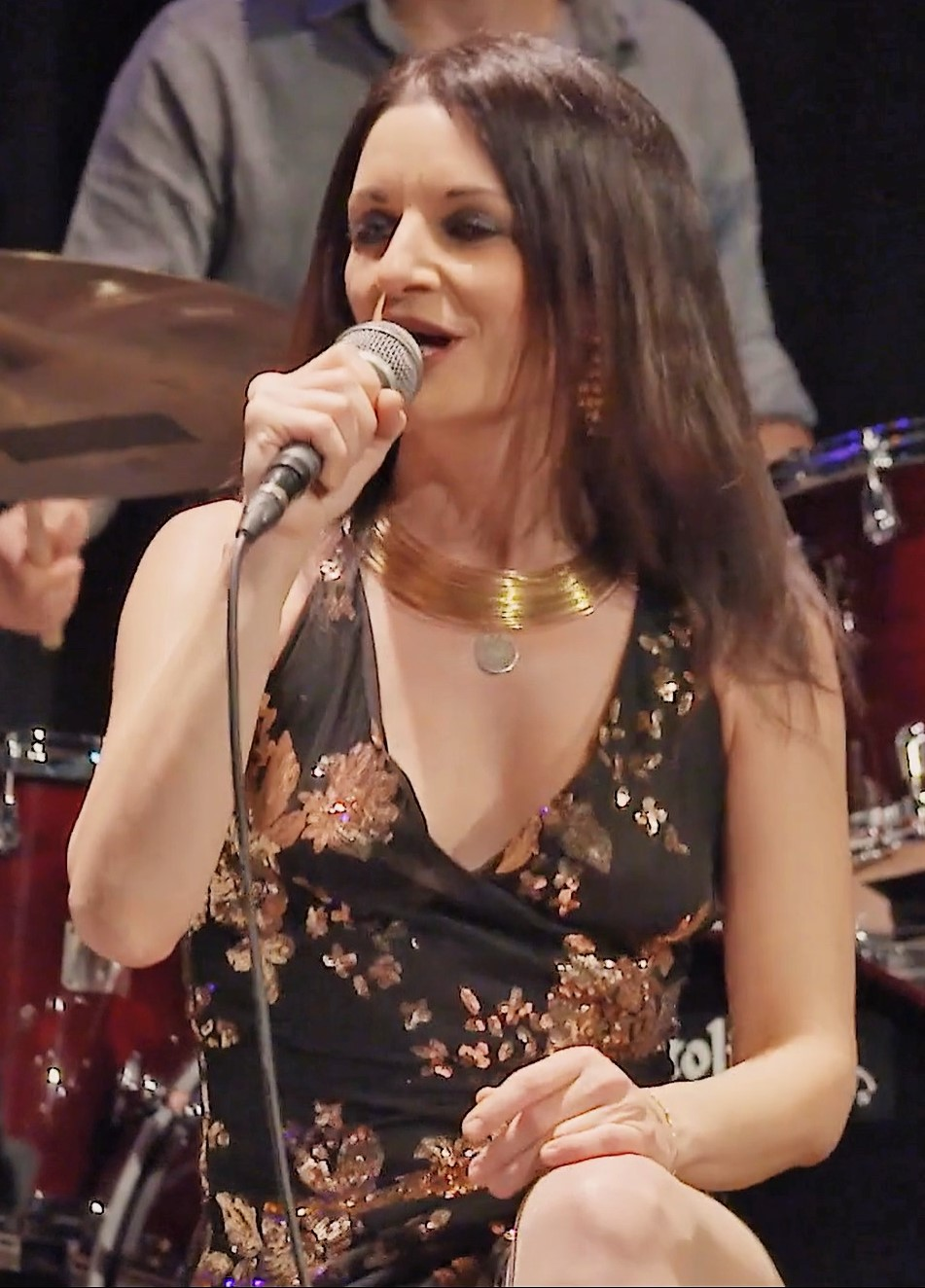
- Barbur in 2020

Background information
- Born: Jehan İstiklal Barbur; 12 April 1980 (age 46); Beirut, Lebanon
- Genres: Pop; jazz
- Occupation: Singer
- Years active: 2004–present
- Label: Ada Müzik (2009–present)

Jehan İstiklal Barbur (born 12 April 1980) is a Turkish singer of Arab Christian descent. In 2002, she moved from Ankara to Istanbul to pursue a professional music career, and initially worked as a vocalist in different pop and jazz groups. With Bülent Ortaçgil's help she signed a contract with the production company Ada Müzik. In 2009, her debut studio album, Uyan, was released. She continued her music career with the release of her second studio album, Hayat, in 2010. She released the albums Sarı, Sizler Hiç Yokken and Evim Neresi in 2012, 2014, and 2017 respectively.

== Early life ==
Barbur, whose family live in İskenderun, was born in Beirut as her mother believed that medical conditions in the Lebanese city were more favorable. After her birth, she spent her childhood in İskenderun, before moving to Ankara to continue her education at a university. She had been interested in music ever since she was a child. However, due to her father's refusal to allow her to go to a conservatory, she enrolled in Bilkent University, Faculty of Humanities and Letters, Department of American Culture and Literature. Barbur was interested in theater and music as an amateur during her university years. She graduated in 2002.

== Career ==
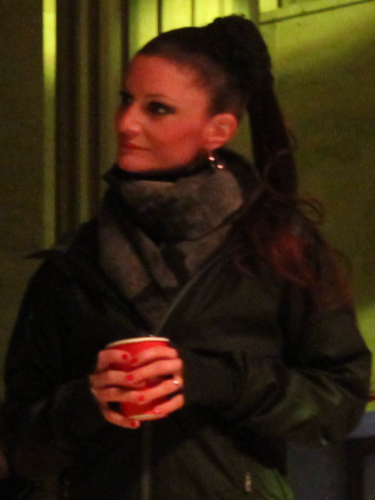
Barbur in October 2011

After graduating from university, Barbur moved to Istanbul to start her professional career. When she finally settled in the city, she didn't know any prominent figure in the music market. She tried to meet with musicians by going to venues where a number of them had live performances. After a two-year search, she started making music with a band. She performed in the same venue for four years. During her time there, she created a fan base of her own. Meanwhile, she started writing lyrics and composing at her home in an amateur studio. She eventually met Bülent Ortaçgil with a friend's help.

After listening to the demos, Bülent Ortaçgil liked the lyrics and composition and said that she should make an album. However, Barbur had no intention of making an album initially. With Ortaçgil's help and with the support of her musician friends, she started to have a positive view on the idea of preparing an album. After a while, with Ortaçgil's suggestion, she signed a contract with the production company Ada Müzik. After working at a studio for six months, two thousand copies of her first album, Uyan, were released. After its release, a number of its songs, including "Gidersen", "Leyla" and "Neden", became among the Top 10 hits on a number of music channels.

Barbur later performed songs for the soundtracks of the TV series Asi and Sır Gibi. She had a duet with Özgür Çevik on a song made for the TV series Gece Sesleri. Barbur also wrote the song "Şermin" for Zuhal Olcay's album Aşk'ın Halleri.

== Discography ==
Albums

- Uyan (2009)
- Hayat (2010)
- Sarı (2012)
- Sizler Hiç Yokken (2014)
- Evim Neresi (2017)
- Ürkerek Söylerim (2019)
- Şehirlerden Uzak (2024)

EPs

- Kuzgun'u Uçmak (2018)

Singles

- "Kendine Zaman Ver" (2014)
- "İki Keklik" (2019)
- "Kusura Bakmasınlar" (2019)
- "Yok / Yetinemedim" (2020)
- "Ayin" (with Korhan Futacı) (2020)
- "Suç" (2021)
- "Olanlar Oldu" (2021)
- "Güzel Şeyler Var" (2022)
- "Sabır Ver" (from the album Saygı Albümü: Bergen) (2022)
- "Güneşli Bahçe" (with Mehmet Güreli) (2022)
- "Yabancı" (with Erkan Oğur and Alp Ersönmez) (2022)
- "Sonbahar Rüzgarları" (with Ceylan Ertem) (from the album Duyuyor Musun?) (2022)
- "Kafamda Deliler Var" (2023)
- "Hasret" (2023)
- "Zor da Değil" (2023)
- "Benim Adım Dertli Dolap" (with Cem Erdost İleri) (from the album PortakalAltı Kayıtları) (2023)
- "Duy Diye" (2024)
- "Arda Boyları" (from the album Kadının Türküsü II) (2025)
- "Seni Seviyorum" (with Nicolas Mouawad) (2025)
- "Bağışla Beni" (2025)
