= List of Turkish films by year =

This is a timeline list of films produced in Turkey and in the Turkish language ordered by year and decade on separate pages. For a complete A-Z list of films on Wikipedia see List of Turkish films: A-Z.

== 20th century ==
- List of Turkish films before 1960
- List of Turkish films of the 1960s
- List of Turkish films of the 1970s
  - List of Turkish films of 1970
  - List of Turkish films of 1971
  - List of Turkish films of 1972
  - List of Turkish films of 1973
  - List of Turkish films of 1974
  - List of Turkish films of 1975
  - List of Turkish films of 1976
  - List of Turkish films of 1977
  - List of Turkish films of 1978
  - List of Turkish films of 1979
- List of Turkish films of the 1980s
- List of Turkish films of the 1990s

== 21st century ==
- List of Turkish films of the 2000s
  - List of Turkish films of 2005
  - List of Turkish films of 2007
  - List of Turkish films of 2008
  - List of Turkish films of 2009
- List of Turkish films of the 2010s
  - List of Turkish films of 2010
  - List of Turkish films of 2011
  - List of Turkish films of 2012
  - List of Turkish films of 2013
  - List of Turkish films of 2014
  - List of Turkish films of 2015
  - List of Turkish films of 2016
  - List of Turkish films of 2017
  - List of Turkish films of 2018
- List of Turkish films of the 2020s
  - List of Turkish films of 2023
  - List of Turkish films of 2024
