= 17th Antalya Golden Orange Film Festival =

1980 Turkish film festival

- Location: Antalya, Turkey
- Awards: Golden Orange
- Festival date: Cancelled
- Website: http://www.aksav.org.tr/en/

Antalya Film Festival
- 18th 16th

The 17th Antalya Golden Orange Film Festival (Turkish: 17. Antalya Altın Portakal Film Festivali) was a film festival scheduled to be held in Antalya, Turkey, in 1980, which was cancelled due to the declaration of martial law throughout the country following the military coup on September 12, 1980.

The awards for this and the preceding festival, which was also cancelled, re-christened Belated Golden Oranges (Turkish: Geç Gelen Altın Portallar), were presented at an award ceremony as part of the 48th International Antalya Golden Orange Film Festival, with the recipients chosen from the films originally selected as candidates by the original jury members selected to represent the competition.

The original 1980 jury was to have consisted of Orhan Aksoy, Melih Cevdet Anday, Atilla Dorsay, Kami Suveren, Ara Güler, Kenan Değer, Erkal Güngören, Doğan Hızlan, Ahmet Keskin, Ergin Orbey, Attila Özdemiroğlu, Nurettin Tekindor, Gani Turanlı, Tonguç Yaşar and Tunca Yönder.

== National Feature Film Competition ==
Jury Members
Prof. Dr. Özdemir Nutku
Hale Soygazi
Selahattin Tonguç
Vecdi Sayar
Atilla Dorsay
Tunca Yönder
Doğan Hızlan
Ahmet Keskin
Nurettin Tekindor
Kenan Değer
Tonguç Yaşar

=== Belated Golden Orange Awards ===
The reconstituted National Feature Film Competition Jury, headed by Prof. Dr. Özdemir Nutku, awarded Belated Golden Oranges in eight categories.

- Best Film: The Herd (Turkish: Sürü) directed by Zeki Ökten
- Best Director: Zeki Ökten for The Herd (Turkish: Sürü) & The Enemy (Turkish: Düşman)
- Best Screenplay: Başar Sabuncu for The Sacrifice (Turkish: Adak)
- Best Music: Zülfü Livaneli for The Herd (Turkish: Sürü)
- Best Actress: Melike Demirağ for The Herd (Turkish: Sürü) and Güngör Bayrak for The Enemy (Turkish: Düşman)
- Best Actor: Tarık Akan for The Sacrifice (Turkish: Adak) & The Herd (Turkish: Sürü) and Aytaç Arman for The Enemy (Turkish: Düşman)
- Best Supporting Actress: Fehamet Atila for The Enemy (Turkish: Düşman)
- Best Supporting Actor: Tuncel Kurtiz for The Herd (Turkish: Sürü)

=== Official Selection ===
Seven Turkish films made in the preceding year were selected to compete in the festival's National Feature Film Competition.

- The Sacrifice (Turkish: Adak) directed by Atıf Yılmaz
- The Herd (Turkish: Sürü) directed by Zeki Ökten
- The Enemy (Turkish: Düşman) directed by Zeki Ökten
- Doktor directed by Zeki Alasya
- On Fertile Lands (Turkish: Bereketli Topraklar Üzerinde) directed by Erden Kıral
- Hasan the Rose (Turkish: Gül Hasan) directed by Tuncel Kurtiz
- Sea Rose (Turkish: Derya Gülü) directed by Süreyya Duru

== See also ==
- 1980 in film
- Turkish films of the 1980s
