= List of Turkish films of the 1970s =

A list of films produced in Turkey in the 1970s:

- List of Turkish films of 1970
- List of Turkish films of 1971
- List of Turkish films of 1972
- List of Turkish films of 1973
- List of Turkish films of 1974
- List of Turkish films of 1975
- List of Turkish films of 1976
- List of Turkish films of 1977
- List of Turkish films of 1978
- List of Turkish films of 1979
