= List of Turkish films of 1979 =

A list of films produced in Turkey in 1979 (see 1979 in film):

Name	Director	Starring	Distributed by	Type	Notes
Acemi Dolandırıcılar					
Adak					
Aferin Çocuğa					
Almanya Acı Vatan					
Ahlaksız					
Anahtar					
Anasına Bak Kızını Al					
Ankara Peşimizde					
Arzu					
Aşk Bebeği					
Aşk Gecesi					
Aşk Penceresi					
Aşk Şarabı					
Aşk Büyüsü					
Aşk Kadını					
Aşk Körfezi					
Aşk ve Nefret					
Aşkı Ben Mi Yarattım					
Aşkın Gözyaşları					
Aşkımla Oynama					
Ay Aman Of					
Ateşli Dilber					
Babanın Kızları					
Bacanak					
Bal Badem					
Bal Peteği					
Balıkçının Kızları					
Bebek					
Bekçiler Kralı					
Beklenen Kadın					
Beni Mahvettiler					
Beni Kadınlara Sor					
Benim Yaşantım					
Bereketli Topraklar Üzerinde					
Binlik Nail					
Bir Çiçek Üç Böcek					
Bir Öpücük Ver Bana					
Biri Gitti Biri Geldi					
Biz Böyle Severiz					
Bu Benim Günahım					
Bu Gece Bende Kal					
Büklüm Büklüm					
Büyük Kumar					
Canım Benim					
Canikom					
Canın İsterse					
Cemilenin Kaderi					
Cici Kız					
Cümbüş Palas					
Çatı					
Çamurdaki Kadın					
Çık Ortaya					
Çıldırtan Dudaklar					
Çılgın Dilber					
Çılgın Bakireler					
Çıplaklar					
Çivi Çiviyi Söker					
Demiryol					
Derya Gülü					
Dilber Dudağı					
Dişi Melek					
Divane					
Doktor					
Dokunmayın Yanarsın					
Dokunmayın Şabanıma					
Dolaşık					
Doyumsuzlar					
Dua					
Dudaktan Dudağa					
Düşman					
Enişte					
Erkek Güzeli Sefil Bilo					
Esmer Bomba					
Esmerim					
Esmerin Adı Sarışının Tadı					
Fadile					
Fakir					
Fırat					
Garibin Çilesi Ölünce Biter					
Garsonyer					
Gazeteci					
Gece Yaşayan Kadın					
Gelin Kayası					
Gelinliksiz Gelin					
Gizli İlişkiler					
Gönül Oyunu / Yatak Hikayemiz					
Gurbet Yastığı					
Gül Hasan (Hasan The Rose)					
Günah Günleri					
Günahkar Kadın					
Handan (Beyoğlu Piliçleri)					
Hayat Harcadın Beni					
Hayat Kadını / Sürtük					
Haydi Bastır					
Hazal					
Helal Sana Recep Abi					
Hızlı Adam					
Ilık Ilık					
Isı					
Isıt Beni					
İhtiras Kurbanları					
İki Cambaz					
İnsan Sevince					
İnek Şaban					
İntikam Kadını					
İsyan					
İsyankar					
İstanbul 79					
İşte Meydan					
İyi Gün Dostu					
Kadersizler					
Kadın İsterse					
Kadının Dünyası					
Kahbe					
Kalbimdeki Fırtına					
Kaldırım Dilberi					
Kaldırım Kuşları					
Kalleş Adam					
Kanun Gücü					
Kara Çadırın Kızı					
Kara Kafa					
Kara Kısrak					
Kara Leke					
Kara Yazma					
Karanlık Sokaklar					
Karpuzcu					
Kasımpaşalı Emmanuel					
Kenarın Kızları					
Koca Aranıyor					
Komşunun Tavuğu					
Korkusuz Korkak					
Köşe Kapmaca					
Köyün Güzeli					
Kuma					
Kumar					
Küskün Çiçek					
Lekeli Kadın					
Leyla, Necla, Mücella					
Maceranın Böylesi					
Madrabaz					
Mahmudo ile Hazel					
Memnu Meyve					
Minnoş					
Mücevher Hırsızları					
Nazey					
Nemrud					
Nokta İle Virgül Paldır Küldür					
N'Olacak Şimdi					
O Kadınlardan Biri					
Oh De Yavrum Oh De					
Oldu Olacak					
Olmaz Şimdi					
Otobüs Neriman					
Öğren de Gel					
Ölüm Benimdir					
Ölüm Emri					
Öttür Kuşu Ömer					
Öyle Bir Kadın Ki					
Patronun Kızları					
Pusu					
Püsküllü Bela / Dilberim Kıyma Bana					
Röntgenci					
Saldırganlar					
Sev Beni					
Seven Sevene					
Sevginin Bedeli					
Sevimli Aşık					
Sıcak Sıcak					
Skandal					
Son Günah					
Son Saat					
Son Söz					
Sona Kalan Dona Kalır					
Suçlular Cehennemi					
Süper Selami					
Süpermen Dönüyor					
Süpermenler	Italo Martinenghi	Cüneyt Arkin		Action	
Şahin					
Şark Bülbülü					
Şaşırtma Beni					
Şehvet Uçurumu					
Şıllık					
Takma Kafanı					
Tamam mı Canım					
Tatlı İstanbul Geceleri					
Tehlikeli Kadınlar					
Tornavida					
Uçurumdaki Kadın					
Umudumuz Şaban					
Üç Sevgili					
Üç Sevgilim					
Üç Tatlı Bela / Öldüren Örümcek					
Vah Başımıza Gelenler					
Vatandaş Rıza					
Vur Vur Kaç Kaç					
Yanmışım					
Yataktan Yatağa					
Yaz Deftere					
Yedi Kocalı					
Yoksul					
Yolcular					
Yosma					
Yudum Yudum Sev					
Yusuf ile Kenan					
Yuvasız Kuşlar					

== See also ==
- 1979 in Turkey
