= 16th Antalya Golden Orange Film Festival =

1979 Turkish film festival

- Location: Antalya, Turkey
- Awards: Golden Orange
- Festival date: Cancelled
- Website: http://www.aksav.org.tr/en/

Antalya Film Festival
- 17th 15th

The 16th Antalya Golden Orange Film Festival (Turkish: 16. Antalya Altın Portakal Film Festivali) was a film festival scheduled to be held in Antalya, Turkey, in 1979 which, was cancelled as a protest against state-imposed censorship.

The competition was cancelled after all the members of the jury and competitors withdrew when the Censorship Committee banned and cut scenes from Ömer Kavur's Yusuf and Kenan (Turkish: Yusuf ile Kenan), Yavuz Özkan's Railroad (Turkish: Demiryol) and Yavuz Pağda's Travelers (Turkish: Yolcular) and the organizing committee canceled the festival in solidarity. A rule change made the films eligible to compete in the following year's festival but this was also subsequently cancelled.

The awards for this and the following festival, which was also cancelled, re-christened Belated Golden Oranges (Turkish: Geç Gelen Altın Portallar), were presented at an award ceremony as part of the 48th International Antalya Golden Orange Film Festival, with the recipients chosen from the films originally selected as candidates by the original jury members selected to represent the competition.

The original 1979 Jury was to have consisted of Prof. Özdemir Nutku, Prof. Alim Şerif Onaran, Süreyya Duru, Onat Kutlar, Emre Kongar, Hale Soygazi, a representative from TRT and a representative from Antalya.

== National Feature Film Competition ==
Jury Members
Prof. Dr. Özdemir Nutku
Hale Soygazi
Selahattin Tonguç
Vecdi Sayar
Atilla Dorsay
Tunca Yönder
Doğan Hızlan
Ahmet Keskin
Nurettin Tekindor
Kenan Değer
Tonguç Yaşar

=== Belated Golden Orange Awards ===
The reconstituted National Feature Film Competition Jury, headed by Prof. Dr. Özdemir Nutku, awarded Belated Golden Oranges in nine categories.

- Best Film: Railroad (Turkish: Demiryol) directed by Yavuz Özkan and Yusuf and Kenan (Turkish: Yusuf ile Kenan) directed by Ömer Kavur
- Best Director: Yavuz Özkan for Railroad (Turkish: Demiryol)
- Best Screenplay: Onat Kutlar & Ömer Kavur for Yusuf and Kenan (Turkish: Yusuf ile Kenan)
- Best Music: Arif Erkin for Canal (Turkish: Kanal)
- Best Actress: Sevda Ferdağ for Last Time with You (Turkish: Seninle Son Defa)
- Best Actor: Fikret Hakan for Railroad (Turkish: Demiryol)
- Best Supporting Actress: Sevda Aktolga for The Baby (Turkish: Bebek) & Railroad (Turkish: Demiryol)
- Best Supporting Actor: Kamuran Usluer for Canal (Turkish: Kanal)
- Best Child Artist: Cem Davran for Yusuf and Kenan (Turkish: Yusuf ile Kenan)

=== Official Selection ===
Twelve Turkish films made in the preceding year were selected to compete in the festival's National Feature Film Competition.

- Last Time with You (Turkish: Seninle Son Defa) directed by Feyzi Tuna
- Honor (Turkish: Töre) directed by Ümit Efekan
- Golden City (Turkish: Altın Şehir) directed by Orhan Aksoy
- Canal (Turkish: Kanal) directed by Erden Kıral
- Citizen Rıza (Turkish: Vatandaş Rıza) directed by Cüneyt Arkın
- Uprising (Turkish: İsyan) directed by Orhan Aksoy
- I Can't Live without You (Turkish: Sensiz Yaşayamam) directed by Metin Erksan
- Dark Head (Turkish: Kara Kafa) directed by Korhan Yurtsever
- The Baby (Turkish: Bebek) directed by İhsan Yüce
- Travelers (Turkish: Yolcular) directed by Yavuz Pağda
- Railroad (Turkish: Demiryol) directed by Yavuz Özkan
- Yusuf and Kenan (Turkish: Yusuf ile Kenan) directed by Ömer Kavur

== National Short Film Competition ==
=== Golden Orange Awards ===
- Best Short Film: Fatma The Woodworker (Turkish: Tahtacı Fatma) directed by Süha Arın

== See also ==
- 1979 in film
