= The Enemy (1979 film) =

1979 film

- Directed by: Zeki Ökten
- Written by: Yılmaz Güney
- Produced by: Yılmaz Güney
- Starring: Aytaç Arman
- Cinematography: Çetin Tunca
- Edited by: Zeki Ökten
- Music by: Yavuz Top; Arif Sağ
- Release date: 1979
- Running time: 133 minutes
- Country: Turkey
- Language: Turkish

The Enemy (Turkish: Düşman) is a 1979 Turkish drama film, written, produced and co-directed by Yılmaz Güney with Zeki Ökten during Güney's second imprisonment, featuring Aytaç Arman as Ismail an overqualified young Turkish worker who unable to find employment is reduced to poisoning the local stray dogs and begging his father for part of his inheritance. The film was screened in competition for the Golden Bear at the 30th Berlin International Film Festival in 1980, where it won an Honourable Mention and the OCIC Award. It was also scheduled to compete in the cancelled 17th Antalya Golden Orange Film Festival, for which it received four Belated Golden Oranges, including Best Director, Best Actor and Best Actress.

== Cast ==
- Aytaç Arman as Ismail
- Güngör Bayrak as Naciye
- Ahmet Açan as Diyarbakirli
- Sevket Altug as Abdullah
- Fehamet Atilla
- Hikmet Çelik
- Hasan Ceylan as Feyyat
- Lütfü Engin as Ismai's father
- Macit Koper as Ismail's brother
- Hüseyin Kutman as Sevket
- Güven Sengil as Nuri
- Kamil Sönmez as Rifat
- Muadelet Tibet as Ismail's mother
- Fehmi Yasar

== Awards ==
- 30th Berlin International Film Festival
  - Honourable Mention
  - OCIC Award
- 17th Antalya Golden Orange Film Festival
  - Belated Golden Orange for Best Director: Zeki Ökten (won, also for The Herd)
  - Belated Golden Orange for Best Actress: Güngör Bayrak (won, shared with Melike Demirağ for The Herd)
  - Belated Golden Orange for Best Actor: Aytaç Arman (won, shared with Tarık Akan for The Sacrifice and The Herd)
  - Belated Golden Orange for Best Supporting Actress: Fehamet Atila (won)
