= The Herd (1978 film) =

Turkish film by Yılmaz Güney, with Zeki Ökten

- Directed by: Zeki Ökten; Yılmaz Güney
- Written by: Yılmaz Güney
- Produced by: Yılmaz Güney
- Starring: Tarık Akan; Tuncel Kurtiz; Güler Ökten; Yaman Okay; Erol Demiröz
- Cinematography: İzzet Akay
- Edited by: Zeki Ökten
- Music by: Zülfü Livaneli; Melike Demirağ; Şivan Perwer
- Distributed by: TurkishFilmChannel
- Release date: 27 September 1978
- Running time: 129 minutes
- Country: Turkey
- Language: Turkish

The Herd (Turkish: Sürü) is a 1978 Turkish drama film, written, produced and co-directed by Zeki Ökten and written by Yılmaz Güney during Güney's second imprisonment. It features Tarık Akan as a peasant, forced by a local blood feud to sell his sheep in faraway Ankara. According to Güney's own account, the development of the script of Sürü, began in 1973 in prison in Selimya and finished it while in prison in Izmit. The conditions to write were at times rather difficult, in Izmit he wrote in a room he shared together with eighty other inmates. The film, which went on nationwide general release on 27 September 1978, was screened in competition at the 30th Berlin International Film Festival, where it won Interfilm and OCIC Awards, the Locarno International Film Festival, where it won Golden Leopard and Special Mention, was scheduled to compete in the cancelled 17th Antalya Golden Orange Film Festival, for which it received 6 Belated Golden Oranges, including Best Film and Best Director, was awarded the BFI Sutherland Trophy and was voted one of the 10 Best Turkish Films by the Ankara Cinema Association.

== Awards ==
- 17th Antalya Golden Orange Film Festival
  - Belated Golden Orange for Best Film (won)
  - Belated Golden Orange for Best Director: Zeki Ökten (won, also for The Enemy)
  - Belated Golden Orange for Best Music: Zülfü Livaneli (won)
  - Belated Golden Orange for Best Actress: Melike Demirağ (won, shared with Güngör Bayrak for The Enemy)
  - Belated Golden Orange for Best Actor: Tarık Akan (won, also for The Sacrifice, shared with Aytaç Arman for The Enemy)
  - Belated Golden Orange for Best Supporting Actor: Tuncel Kurtiz (won)
- Belgian Film Critics Association: Grand Prix (won)
