= Melike Demirağ =

Turkish musician and actress

Ayşe Melike Demirağ (born June 3, 1956, Istanbul) is a Turkish singer and actress. Known for her political songs in the 1970s, Demirağ became famous for her roles in Yılmaz Güney's 1974 film Arkadaş and his 1978 film Sürü. The song "Arkadaş," which she performed through the film's music, became one of the most popular songs of the period.

== Biography ==
Melike Demirağ was born on June 3, 1956, in Istanbul. Her mother, Rüçhan Çamay, was a singer and stage artist, and her father, Turgut Demirağ, was a film producer and director. Melike graduated from Üsküdar Turkish Girls' College. In 1971, she began her acting career with the film Üç Kızgın Cengaver, directed by her father. In 1974, at the age of 18, she shared the lead role with Yılmaz Güney in the film Arkadaş, directed by Yılmaz Güney. She also sang the song "Arkadaş", which was written by Yılmaz Güney and composed by Şanar Yurdatapan. The song became one of the most popular songs of the time. Due to the fame brought by this song, she ranked 5th with 870 votes in Hey magazine's "Promising Female Artists of the Year" list in 1974. She married Şanar Yurdatapan, whom she met during the film's production, on December 28, 1976. They have two children: Zeynep Ferah (born in 1979) and Can (born in 1989).

Demirağ's fame increased with the release of 45 RPM singles of songs like "Merhaba" (1975), "Hadi Canım Sen De" (1975), "Ağlamak Ayıp Değil" (1976), "Ninni" (1976), and "Pervane ile Işık" (1977). In 1978, she starred alongside Tarık Akan and Tuncel Kurtiz in Sürü, a film with a screenplay written by Yılmaz Güney, where she portrayed Berivan, a sick and mute Kurdish girl. Her performance in this film earned her the "Best Actress Award" for the 1980 Antalya Golden Orange Film Festival, awarded during a ceremony 31 years later at the 48th International Antalya Golden Orange Film Festival, because the 1980 event had been cancelled due to the 1980 military coup. The Turkish Film Critics Association (SİYAD) also awarded her the Best Actress Award for this performance in 1979. The film also won the "Best Film" award at the 1979 Locarno International Film Festival in Switzerland and received the Golden Leopard Award. The opening music of Sürü, composed by Zülfü Livaneli and with lyrics by Şivan Perwer, was later performed in Kurdish by Melike Demirağ under the title "Brindarım" (Turkish: "Yaralıyım").

Following the 1980 military coup, Demirağ was among the expatriates who lost their Turkish citizenship.
