= List of Turkish films of 1978 =

A list of films produced in Turkey in 1978 (see 1978 in film):

Name	Director	Starring	Distributed by	Type	Notes
Ağa Düşen Kadın					
Aklın Neredeydi?					
Aldırma Gönül					
Ali Babanın Çiftliği					
Altın Şehir					
Antika Karyola					
Astronot Fehmi					
Aşk Ve Adalet					
Aşkın Sıcaklığı					
Aşkın Kanunu					
Avanak Apti					
Avare					
Ayağında Kundura - Ceylan					
Azrailin Beş Atlısı					
Baba Kartal					
Balkona Etti					
Batak					
Batan Güneş					
Bir Aşk Masalı					
Bir Garip Yabancı					
Bir Daha Affetmem					
Biyonik Futbolcu					
Bizim Fıstıklar					
Cafer'in Çilesi					
Can Hatice					
Cevriyem					
Çaresiz					
Çarli'nin Kelebekleri					
Çilekeş					
Denizden Gelen Kadın					
Dertli Pınar					
Derdim Dünyadan Büyük					
Derviş Bey					
Devler Savaşıyorlar (Kara Murat)					
Dilek Kutusu					
Dost Bildiklerim					
Düzen					
El Bebek Gül Bebek					
Evlidir Ne Yapsa Yeridir					
Fırçana Bayıldım Boyacı (Erkekler Öldü mü Abiler)					
Gelincik					
Görünmeyen Düşman					
Güneşden De Sıcak					
Hababam Sınıfı Dokuz Doğuruyor					
Hanımevladı					
Hayat Kadınları					
Hedef					
Hedefte Vuruşanlar					
Hey Yavrum Hey					
Ilık Dudaklar					
İçimdeki Yangın					
İnek Şaban					
İnsanları Seveceksin					
İster Gül İster Ağla					
İsmet Bu Ne Kısmet					
İstek					
İyi Aile Çocuğu					
İşte Bizim Hikayemiz					
Kabadayı Böyle Sever					
Kadınlar Koğuşu (Üç öykülü film)					
Kadınlar Hamamı					
Kalp Kalbe Karşıdır					
Kanal					
Kaplanlar Ağlamaz					
Kaybolan Yıllar					
Kene					
Kendin Pişir Kendin Ye					
Kılıç Bey					
Kış Bekarı					
Kibar Feyzo					
Korkak Kahraman					
Korkusuz Aşıklar					
Köfte Ekmek Piyaz					
Köşeyi Dönen Adam					
Lekeli Melek					
Maden					
Maden Dağı					
Minik Serçe					
Ne Olacak Şimdi					
Nefret					
Neşeli Günler					
Oh Oh					
Onsuz Olamam					
Olmadı Baştan					
Ölüm Savaşı					
Ölüm Yarışı					
Ölüm Görevi					
Ölüm Çemberi					
Petrol Kralları					
Rezil					
Romalı Dilber					
Sabır Taşı					
Seninle Son Defa					
Seven Unutmaz					
Sevmek Mi Ölmek Mi					
Sevgili Kardeş					
Sımsıcak					
Sıra Sana Gelecek					
Son Sabah					
Sormagir Sokağı					
Sultan					
Sürü					
Şahit					
Şerefsiz Şeref					
Şeytan Köşeyi Döndü					
Tatlı Nigar					
Tatlı Sevgilim Kaymaklı Lokum					
Töre					
Toprağın Oğlu					
Uçurum					
Uyanış					
Üşütük					
Vahşi Gelin					
Vahşi Ve Tatlınek Şaban					
Ya Bundadır Ya Şunda					
Yadeller					
Yara					
Yaşam Kavgası					
Yedi Yürekli Şaban					
Yengen					
Yıkılış					
Yüz Karası					
Yüz Numaralı Adam					
Yüzme Bilmiyorsan İşin Ne Ağaçta					
Zeynel İle Veysel					
Zor Oyunu Bozar					

== See also ==
- 1978 in Turkey
