= Ediz Hun =

Turkish film actor, academician and politician

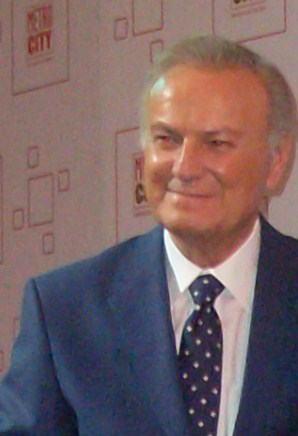
- Hun in 2014
- Born: 22 November 1940 (age 85); Istanbul, Turkey
- Occupations: Actor, politician
- Years active: 1963–present
- Spouse: Berna Hun (m. 1973)
- Children: 2

Ediz Hun (born 20 November 1940) is a Turkish film actor, academician and politician.

== Early life and education ==
Hun was born in 1940 in Istanbul to a Circassian father and a Turkish mother. He attended St. George's Austrian High School in Istanbul before moving to Norway in the mid-1970s. He studied Biology and Environmental Science at the University of Oslo and the Norwegian University of Science and Technology (Trondheim), graduating with a degree in the field.

== Career ==
=== Acting ===
His career in Yeşilçam began after participating in a contest organized by Ses (The Voice) magazine, where he was noticed by film producers. He made his debut in 1963 with the film Genç Kızlar (Young Girls) opposite Hülya Koçyiğit. He became a household name, frequently starring alongside Filiz Akın, and at the height of his career, he appeared in more than 10 films per year.

=== Academia and politics ===
Upon returning to Turkey from his studies in Norway, Hun transitioned into academia. In 1985, he became a lecturer at Marmara University, specializing in ecology and environmental issues.

Hun entered politics in the late 1990s and was elected as a Member of Parliament for Istanbul representing the Motherland Party (ANAP) in the 1999 Turkish general election. He served in the Grand National Assembly of Turkey until 2002, focusing on environmental protection laws.

His academic career is examined in the 2026 biographical documentary film Son Oyun (The Last Act), written and directed by Tunç Topçuoğlu. The film explores Hun's life and career across cinema, environmental science, academia, and theater and was first screened at the Antalya Golden Orange Film Festival.

== Personal life ==
On 3 March 1973, Hun married Berna Hun. The couple has two children: a daughter, Bengü (born 1974), and a son, Burak (born 1981).

== Awards and honors ==
Throughout his career, Hun has received numerous accolades for his contributions to cinema and environmental advocacy:

- **Golden Orange Life Achievement Award** (2001) – 38th Antalya Golden Orange Film Festival.
- **Cinema Honorary Award** (2008) – 27th Istanbul International Film Festival.
- **Golden Boll Life Achievement Award** (2012) – 19th Adana Golden Boll Film Festival.
- **Honorary Award** (2015) – 8th International Çayda Çıra Film Festival.
- **Presidential Culture and Arts Grand Award** (2021) – Awarded in the field of Cinema.

== Filmography ==
The filmography of Ediz Hun includes over 130 films and television series. Below is a comprehensive list:

Year	Title	Role	Notes
2026	Son Oyun (The Last Act)	Himsef	Biographical documentary
2021	Savaşçı	Gündüz Göktürk	TV series
2018	Arif V 216	Himself	Guest appearance
2014–2015	Hayat Yolunda		TV series
2011	Anadolu Kartalları	Hava Kuvvetleri Komutanı	
2005	Asla Unutma		TV series
2005	Azize		
2004	Paydos		
2004	Yadigar		TV series
2001	Şöhret Sandalı		
1997	Unutmadım		
1997	İlk Aşk		
1995	Gökkuşağı		TV series
1985	Acımak	Turgut	TV series
1976	Aman Karım Duymasın		
1974	Garip Kuş		
1974	Yüz Lira ile Evlenilmez		
1974	Gariban		
1973	Ağlıyorum		
1973	Aşkımla Oynama		
1973	Şüphe		
1973	Güllü Geliyor Güllü		
1973	Karateci Kız	Murat	
1973	Soyguncular		
1972	Gülüzar		
1972	Zehra		
1972	Çile		
1972	Tanrı Misafiri		
1972	Sezercik Aslan Parçası		
1972	Asi Kalpler		
1972	Ayrılık		
1971	Yumurcağın Tatlı Rüyaları		
1971	Yarın Ağlayacağım		
1971	Ayşecik Bahar Çiçeği		
1971	Hayatım Senindir		
1971	Güllü	Fikret	
1971	Mavi Eşarp		
1971	Gönül Hırsızı		
1971	Bütün Anneler Melektir		
1971	Seni Sevmek Kaderim		
1971	Fadime Cambazhane Gülü		
1971	Yağmur		
1971	Bir Genç Kızın Romanı		
1970	Tatlı Meleğim		
1970	Kezban Roma'da		
1970	Ankara Ekspresi	Binbaşı Seyfi	
1970	Kalbimin Efendisi	Ferit	
1970	Kader Bağlayınca		
1970	Yaban Gülü		
1970	Söz Müdafanın		
1970	Yuvasız Kuşlar		
1969	Ateşli Çingene		
1969	Sonbahar Rüzgarları		
1969	Uykusuz Geceler		
1969	Yaralı Kalp		
1969	Gülnaz Sultan		
1969	Kahraman Delikanlı		
1969	Kanlı Aşk		
1969	Öldüren Aşk		
1969	Ölmüş Bir Kadının Mektupları		
1969	Son Mektup		
1969	Sen Bir Meleksin	Orhan	
1968	Ömrümün Tek Gecesi		
1968	Hicran Gecesi		
1968	Aşkım Günahımdır		
1968	Gönüllü Kahramanlar		
1968	Sabah Yıldızı		
1968	Ana Hakkı Ödenmez		
1968	Kadın Asla Unutmaz		
1968	Gözyaşlarım		
1968	Yuvana Dön Baba		
1968	Gül ve Şeker		
1967	Samanyolu	Nejat	
1967	Ayrılsak da Beraberiz		
1967	Kelepçeli Melek		
1967	Sinekli Bakkal	Peregrini	
1967	Bir Soförun Gizli Defteri		
1967	Yaprak Dökümü	Şevket	
1967	Kaderim Ağlamak Mı		
1967	Nemli Dudaklar		
1967	Sevda		
1967	İlk Aşkım		
1967	Yarın Çok Geç Olacak		
1967	Sözde Kızlar		
1967	Ömrümce Ağladım		
1966	Beş Fındıkçı Gelin		
1966	Çamaşırcı Güzeli		
1966	Eli Maşalı		
1966	Erkek Severse		
1966	Affet Sevgilim		
1966	Allahaısmarladık		
1966	Severek Döğüşenler		
1966	İhtiras Kurbanları		
1966	Bar Kızı		
1966	Kucaktan Kucağa		
1966	Altın Küpeler		
1965	Elveda Sevgilim		
1965	Sevgili Öğretmenim		
1965	Son Kuşlar	Oğuz	
1965	Üç Kardeşe Bir Gelin		
1965	Vahşi Gelin	Doğan	
1965	Seven Kadın Unutmaz		
1965	Bir Gönül Oyunu		
1965	Tehlikeli Adımlar		
1965	Hıçkırık	Kenan	
1964	Beş Şeker Kız		
1964	Gençlik Rüzgarı		
1964	Öksüz Kız		
1964	Bir İçim Su		
1964	Ahtapotun Kolları		
1964	Affetmeyen Kadın		
1964	Gecelerin Kadını		
1964	Mualla	Melih	
1963	Genç Kızlar	İskender	Film debut
