= Erkan Avcı =

Turkish actor

- Born: 17 December 1982 (age 42); Diyarbakır, Turkey
- Occupation: Actor
- Years active: 2006–present

Erkan Avcı (born 17 December 1982) is a Turkish actor who is well-known for his roles in popular films and drama series such as Çukur, Kuruluş: Osman and Kızıl Goncalar.

== Life and career ==
Avcı is a graduate of economics from Bilkent University . He has also studied MBA from Ankara University . He started his acting career in 2006 by making his television debut in the series Köprü. He received critical acclaim for his role as Ahmet in the movie Zenne, for which he received the Best Supporting Actor Award at the 48th International Antalya Golden Orange Film Festival. He rose to prominence with his portrayal of the character Barut Necdet in the series Karadayı.

He is also known for his roles as Çeto in Çukur and Aya Nikola in Kuruluş: Osman. He later accepted the prominent role of Sadi Hüdayi Güneş in the Gold Film Production's hit drama series Kızıl Goncalar which ran for two seasons. He has recently joined the season four cast of Kızılcık Şerbeti (Cranberry Sorbet) under the same production house.

== Filmography ==
=== Film ===
Film
| Year | Title | Role | Notes |
|---|---|---|---|
| 2018 | Müslüm | Bahtiyar | Supporting role |
| 2012 | Uzun Hikâye | Selami | Supporting role |
| 2011 | Zenne | Ahmet | Leading role |
| 2011 | Gişe Memuru | Afar Driver 2 | Supporting role |
| 2011 | Can | Ali | Supporting role |

=== TV series ===
Television
| Year | Title | Role | Notes |
|---|---|---|---|
| 2023–2025 | Kızıl Goncalar | Sadi Hüdayi Güneş | Leading role |
| 2022–2023 | Hayatımın Şansı | Mazhar | Leading role |
| 2020–2022 | Kuruluş: Osman | Aya Nikola | Leading role |
| 2019–2020 | Şampiyon | Zafer | Leading role |
| 2018–2019 | Çukur | Çeto | Leading role |
| 2018 | Payitaht: Abdülhamid | Fehim Paşa | Leading role |
| 2016–2017 | Cesur ve Güzel | Korhan Korludağ | Leading role |
| 2012–2015 | Karadayı | Barut Necdet | Leading role |
| 2009–2012 | Sakarya Fırat | Ethem Tekintaş | Supporting role |
| 2009 | Acemi Müezzin | Cemal | Supporting role |
| 2007 | Kurtlar Vadisi Pusu | Gürhan | Supporting role |
| 2007 | Ayrılık | Yunus | Supporting role |
| 2006 | Köprü | Hasan | Supporting role |

== Awards ==
| Year | Award | Category | Work | Result |
|---|---|---|---|---|
| 2011 | 48th International Antalya Golden Orange Film Festival | Best Supporting Actor | Zenne | Won |
