= Pehlivan (film) =

1984 film

- Film poster
- Directed by: Zeki Ökten
- Written by: Fehmi Yasar
- Starring: Tarık Akan
- Cinematography: Hüseyin Dişiaçık
- Release date: 1984
- Running time: 98 minutes
- Country: Turkey
- Language: Turkish

Pehlivan is a 1984 Turkish drama film directed by Zeki Ökten. It was entered into the 35th Berlin International Film Festival where Tarık Akan won an Honourable Mention.

== Cast ==
- Tarık Akan as Bilal
- Yavuzer Cetinkaya as Cevdet
- Tulug Çizgen as Cemile
- Erol Günaydin as Mestan
- Ahmet Kayiskesen as Bilal's father
- Yaman Okay as Tevfik
- Meral Orhonsay as Senem
