= Zenne Dancer =

- Directed by: Caner Alper and Mehmet Binay
- Written by: Caner Alper
- Produced by: Bulut Reyhanoglu
- Starring: Kerem Can; Giovanni Arvaneh; Erkan Avcı
- Cinematography: Norayr Kasper
- Music by: Paolo Potì - Demir Demirkan
- Release dates: October 2011 (Antalya Film Fest); 13 January 2012
- Running time: 99 minutes
- Country: Turkey
- Language: Turkish-German-English

Zenne Dancer is a 2011 Turkish drama film directed by Caner Alper and Mehmet Binay.

The film is based upon an honor killing of a student, Ahmet Yıldız, by his family after realizing he was homosexual. The film describes the discrimination that LGBT people in Turkey have to deal with.

== Awards ==
- Best First Film, Antalya Golden Orange Film Festival (2011)
- Best Film by Siyad (Cinema Critics), Antalya Golden Orange Film Festival (2011)
- Best Supporting Actor - Erkan Avcı, Antalya Golden Orange Film Festival (2011)
- Best Supporting Actress - Tilbe Saran, Antalya Golden Orange Film Festival (2011)
- Best Cinematography, Antalya Golden Orange Film Festival (2011)
- Vienna LetsCee Film Festival Best Feature Award

2012

- San Diego Filmout Film Festival Best Foreign Feature Award
- San Diego Filmout Film Festival Best Cinematography
- San Diego Filmout Film Festival Best Soundtrack
- San Diego Filmout Film Festival Best Supporting Actor
- San Diego Filmout Film Festival Freedom Award (M.Binay – C.Alper)
- 2012 Los Angeles International AFFMA Film Festival - Best Director Award
- 2012 Montreal World Film Festival Official Selection
- 2012 SIYAD Turkish Cinema Critics Best Soundtrack of the Year Award
- 2012 Monaco Charity Film Festival Honorary Mention
- 2012 Nuremberg Turkish Film Festival Öngören Prize Human Rights Best Feature Award
- 2012 Amsterdam Rosetagen Film Festival Audience Best Feature Award
- 2012 GQ Men Of The Year - Best Director Award - Caner Alper & Mehmet Binay
- 2013 Bilkent University Cinema Festival - Best Film -
  - Bilkent University Cinema Festival Best Director -
  - Bilkent University Cinema Festival Best Screenplay -
  - Bilkent University Cinema Festival Best Music -
  - Bilkent University Cinema Festival Best Cinematography

== Cast ==
- Kerem Can - Can
- Giovanni Arvaneh - Daniel Bert
- Erkan Avcı - Ahmet
- Tilbe Saran - Sevgi
- Rüçhan Çalışkur - Kezban
- Ünal Silver - Yılmaz

== Choreography ==
Eserzâde
