= Hunting Time =

1988 film

- Directed by: Erden Kıral
- Written by: Ferit Edgü
- Starring: Aytaç Arman
- Cinematography: Kenan Ormanlar
- Release date: February 1988
- Running time: 96 minutes
- Country: Turkey
- Language: Turkish

Hunting Time (Turkish: Av Zamanı) is a 1988 Turkish drama film directed by Erden Kıral about the 1980 Turkish coup d'état. It was entered into the 38th Berlin International Film Festival.

== Cast ==
- Aytaç Arman
- Zihni Küçümen
- Serif Seler
