= My Dear Brother =

- Directed by: Ertem Eğilmez
- Starring: Tarık Akan; Halit Akçatepe
- Release date: 1973
- Running time: 92 minutes
- Country: Turkey
- Language: Turkish

My Dear Brother (Turkish: Canım Kardeşim) is a 1973 Turkish drama film directed by Ertem Eğilmez.

== Plot ==
Kahraman leads a poor but cheerful life with his brother Murat and his loyal friend Halit. Later in the night, after a fire at home, their father was poisoned by smoke and died. Kahraman remains with his brother Murat. Murat's friend Halit is fired and settles with Murat. Kahraman's only dream is to buy a television at home. Kahraman's remaining teacher calls his brother and tells him to take care of his brother's cleanliness. Then Kahraman becomes sluggish. Her brother and friend take her to the doctor and the doctor tells her that her brother has cancer. Murat and his friend are very surprised and upset when they get the news of Kahraman who has cancer. The doctor tells her brother to fulfill every request. Later, they meet with Kahraman's teacher and he gives permission until the disease is cleared. Murat and Halit try to fulfill every request of Kahraman.

Despite their bad situation, they eat in restaurants, take them to the amusement park and fulfill every wish. They can't just buy the TV that Kahraman wants so much. They do everything they can to get the TV, but they can't take it. One night, as they return home, they steal the television they see in a store window and bring it home. Murat and Halit procure television, which is Kahraman's greatest desire, by playing on the last day of their promised date. They exhibit a rebellion against helplessness, and this time they become practitioners of violence against the system. Because there is a system violence that has been committed since the beginning of the film. They sit at home after they play the television and laugh, this is a moment of happiness without recipe for them and the audience. The system was defeated and imposed. But the Kahraman dies before he can see his TV.

== Cast ==
- Tarık Akan - Murat
- Kahraman Kıral - Kahraman
- Halit Akçatepe - Halit
- Metin Akpinar - Mehmet
- Adile Naşit - Teacher
- Kemal Sunal - Abroad Passenger
- Sıtkı Akçatepe - Musta

== Soundtrack ==
Movie's soundtrack was composed by Cahit Oben. He received an award for The Best Soundtrack at The Golden Boll film Festival that year.

== Social Impact ==
The movie was shot during the Turkish industrialization. At that time, urbanization also accelerated in Turkey. Rural to urban migration rate was higher than industrialization and employment rates. As a consequence, people began to construct slums in areas without occupancy permit. In 1970's, most of the citizens were living in slums in the big cities of Turkey. The characters of the movie who faced financial and health problems, also lived in slums. The movie clearly reveals the difficulties that people faced at that time.
