= Güler Ökten =

Turkish actress (born 1941)

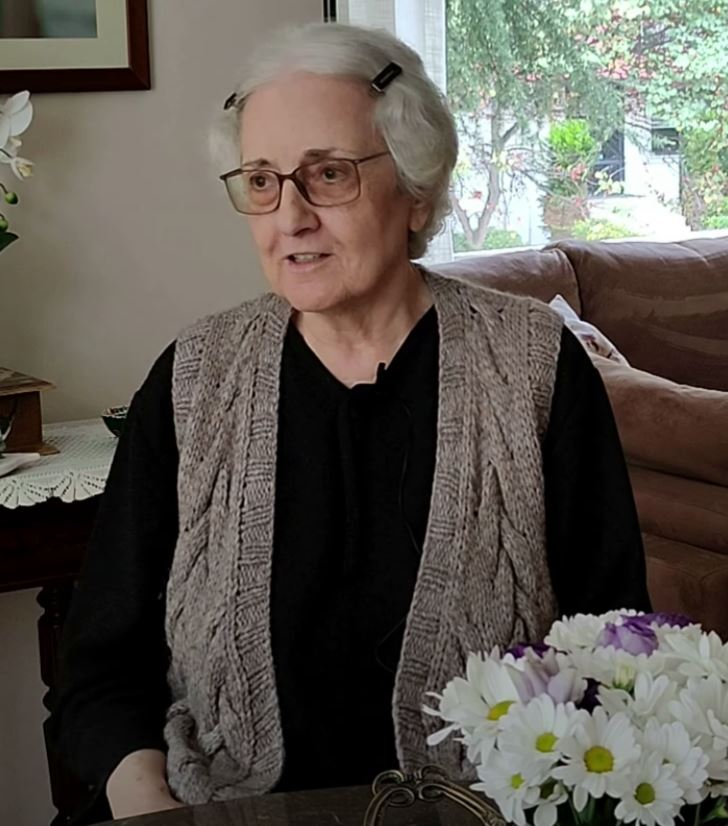
- Born: Servet Güler Kıpçak; 14 November 1941 (age 84); Istanbul, Turkey
- Occupation: Actress
- Years active: 1947–present
- Spouse: Zeki Ökten (m. 1964; died 2009)

Servet Güler Kıpçak Ökten (born 14 November 1941) is a Turkish actress. She is best known for her roles in Bizimkiler as Türkan and in Yaprak Dökümü as Cevriye.

== Life and career ==
A graduate of the conservatory, she was among the students trained by Yıldız Kenter. Her father, Kani Kıpçak, was an actor and director as well. Ökten started her acting career in 1947 with a small role in a movie. She started appearing on stage in 1960 and appeared in many movies and TV series afterwards.

== Filmography ==
- Bir Demet Menekşe – 1973
- Kapıcılar Kralı – 1976
- Şabanoğlu Şaban – 1977
- Seninle Son Defa – 1978
- Sürü – 1978
- İsyan – 1979
- Demiryolu – 1979
- At – 1981
- Kırık Bir Aşk Hikayesi – 1981
- Fidan – 1984
- Bir Kadın Bir Hayat – 1985
- Gülüşan – 1985
- Asiye Nasıl Kurtulur? – 1986
- Bekçi – 1986
- Asılacak Kadın – 1986
- Ses – 1986
- Dilan – 1986
- Afife Jale – 1987
- Biri ve Diğerleri – 1987
- Hüzün Çemberi – 1988
- Geçmiş Bahar Mimozaları – 1989
- Bizimkiler – 1989
- Cahide – 1989
- Hiçbir Gece – 1989
- Çiçekler Boy Verince – 1990
- Bir Milyara Bir Çocuk – 1990
- Yıldızlar Gece Büyür – 1991
- Acılar ve Arzular – 1991
- Yazlıkçılar – 1993
- Saygılar Bizden – 1993
- C Blok – 1993
- Ali / Sakın Arkana Bakma – 1996
- Baba Evi – 1997
- Mektup – 1997
- Kaçıklık Diploması – 1998
- Günaydın İstanbul Kardeş – 1999
- Güle Güle – 1999
- Beni Unutma – 2000
- Bana Şans Dile – 2001
- Canım Kocacığım – 2002
- Gülüm – 2002
- Bana Abi De – 2002
- Sultan Makamı – 2003
- Kalbin Zamanı – 2004
- Perili Ev – 2004
- Çemberimde Gül Oya – 2004 (guest appearance)
- Hırsız Polis – 2005–2006
- Erkek Tarafı – 2005
- Sen Ne Dilersen – 2005
- Kabuslar Evi: Tanıdık Yabancı – 2006
- Yaprak Dökümü – 2007–2010 – Cevriye
- Leyla ile Mecnun – 2011–2012
- Karanlıklar Çiçeği – 2012
- İntikam – 2013 (guest appearance)
- Kara Para Aşk – 2014
- İtirazım Var – 2014 – Ani Hanım
- Aşk ve Gurur – 2017 – Gülnaz Işıl
- Cennet'in Gözyaşları – 2017
- Yürek Çıkmazı – 2022-2023
- Annem Ankara – 2024
- Ask Tesadüfleri Sever 3 – 2026
