= Tatlı Dillim =

- Directed by: Ertem Eğilmez
- Written by: Ertem Eğilmez
- Produced by: Arzu Film
- Starring: Tarık Akan; Filiz Akın
- Release date: 1972
- Language: Turkish

Tatlı Dillim (Turkish: "Sweet Talker") is a 1972 Turkish romantic comedy film starring Tarık Akan and Filiz Akın, written and directed by Ertem Eğilmez. It is also the first ever film for Kemal Sunal although his role is a very small one.

== Cast ==
- Tarık Akan
- Filiz Akın
- Halit Akçatepe
- Metin Akpınar
- Zeki Alasya
- Hulusi Kentmen
- Münir Özkul
- Kemal Sunal
