= Ankara Express (film) =

Ankara Ekspresi (Ankara Express)
- Film poster
- Directed by: Muzaffer Aslan
- Written by: Screenplay: Bülent Oran; Novel: Esat Mahmut Karakurt
- Produced by: Muzaffer Aslan
- Starring: Ediz Hun; Filiz Akın
- Cinematography: Cengiz Tacer
- Distributed by: Sine Film
- Release date: 1970
- Running time: 76 minutes
- Country: Turkey
- Language: Turkish

Ankara Ekspresi (English title: Ankara Express) is a 1970 Turkish film directed by Muzaffer Arlan, adapted from the book of the same name by Esat Mahmut Karakurt. It stars Ediz Hun and Filiz Akın.

The film won five Golden Orange awards: best film, best director (Muzaffer Aslan), best actress (Filiz Akın), best screenplay (Bülent Oran) and best cinematography (Cengiz Tacer)

== Cast ==
- Filiz Akın - Hilda
- Ediz Hun - Binbaşı Seyfi Bey
- Leyla Sayar - İrma
- Kadir İnanır - Maximillian
- Kayhan Yıldızoğlu - Albay Klinger
- Bülent Oran
- Hüseyin Kutman - Jackson
- Altan Günbay - Binbaşı Kolman
- Aliye Rona - Büyükanne
- Bora Ayanoğlu
- Süheyl Eğriboz
- Erdo Vatan
- Zeki Sezer
- Ali Demir
