= Kızımın Kanı =

- Directed by: Halit Refiğ
- Starring: Tarik Akan, Mine Baysan, and Neslihan Acar
- Release date: 1987
- Country: Turkey
- Language: Turkish

Kızımın Kanı (My Daughter's Blood) is a 1987 Turkish thriller/rape and revenge film, directed by Halit Refiğ and starring Tarik Akan, Mine Baysan, and Neslihan Acar.

== Plot ==
Cemil is a ski instructor who is divorced from his wife. His daughter Figen lives with her mother. Figen's lover, Hakan, knocks Figen unconscious, rapes her and takes pictures of her to blackmail her. He forces her to have a relationship with Musa, a mafia boss. Figen dies from the drug overdose she was given. Cemil seeks revenge.

== Cast ==
- Tarık Akan: Cemil
- Mine Baysan
- Neslihan Acar
- Kaya Sensev
- Ayşegül Ünsal
- Yüksel Gözen
- Şehriban Emirli
- Yavuz Karakaş
- Atilla Kunt
- Yusuf Çetin
- Esval Ayral
- Bülent Polat
- Cansu Açıkoğlu
- Mürüvet Coşkun
- İsmail Kısak
- Süheyl Eğriboz
- Hasan Saraç
- Nejat Gürçen
- Mesut Sürmeli
- Necmi Öney
- Ahmet Canseven

== Reception ==
The film is described as being part of a group of Turkish films from the early 1980s, based on a similar narrative and thematic structure, "the tragedy of young people dragged into the swamp of drugs and prostitution is an event that can be roughly summarized as introduction-development-conclusion in the context of a cause-effect relationship."
