= Devil, My Friend =

- Directed by: Atıf Yılmaz
- Starring: Mazhar Alanson; Ali Poyrazoğlu
- Release date: 1988
- Running time: 1h 30min
- Country: Turkey
- Language: Turkish

Devil, My Friend (Turkish: Arkadaşım Şeytan) is a 1988 Turkish comedy film directed by Atıf Yılmaz.

A struggling musician sells his soul to the devil in exchange for fame.

== Cast ==
- Mazhar Alanson - Fatih
- Ali Poyrazoğlu - The Devil
- Yaprak Özdemiroğlu
- Özkan Uğur
- Ayhan Sicimoğlu
- Bülent Kayabaş
