= Bülent Kayabaş =

Turkish actor

- Born: Osman Bülent Kayabaş; 25 August 1945; Eskişehir, Turkey
- Died: 19 April 2017 (aged 71); Istanbul, Turkey
- Occupation: Actor
- Years active: 1963–2017
- Spouses: Nur Sürer (m. 1981; div. 1994) Selma Kayabaş (m. 2007)
- Children: One

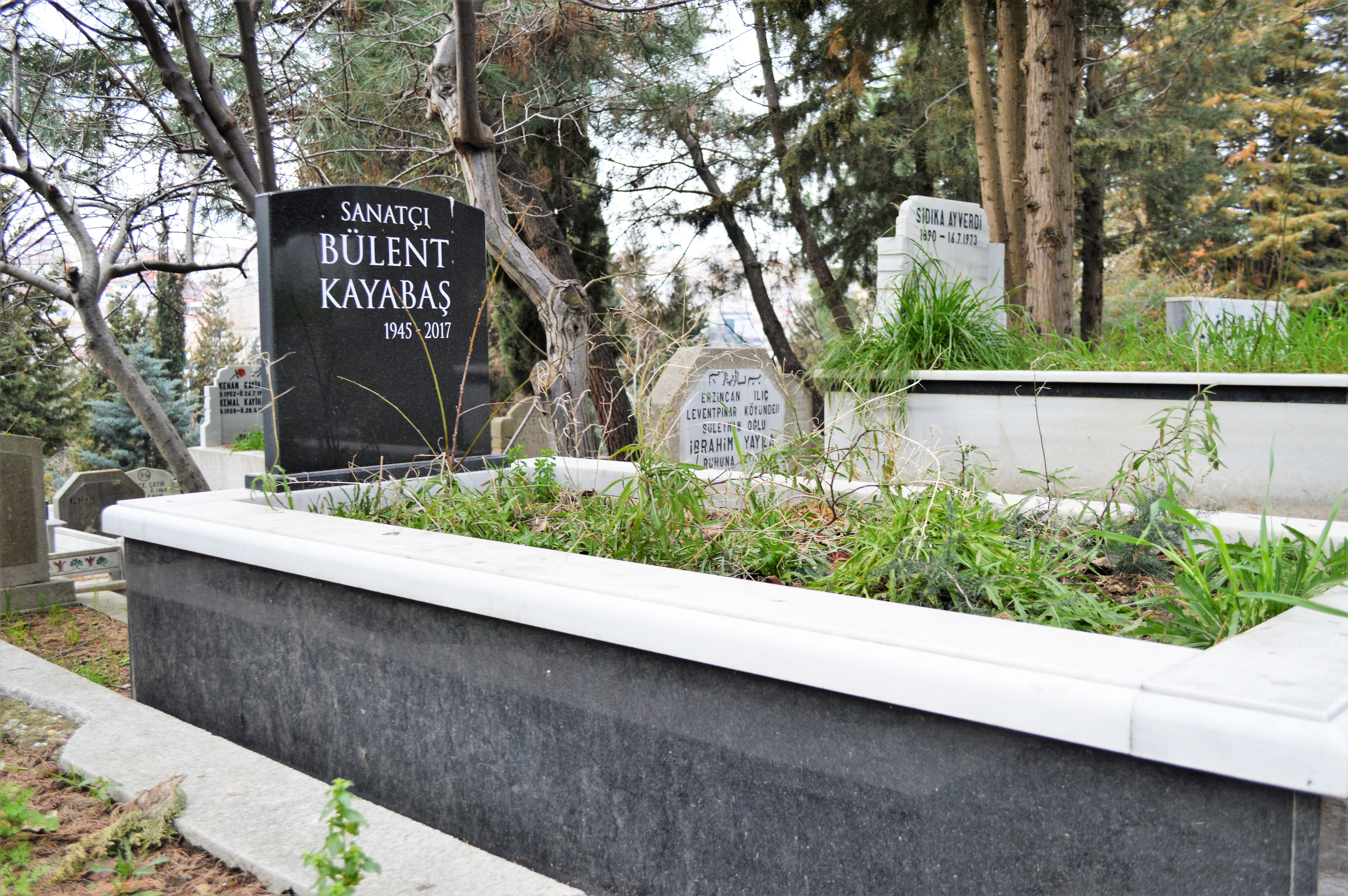
Grave of Bülent Kayabaş

Osman Bülent Kayabaş (25 August 1945 – 19 April 2017) was a Turkish actor. He appeared in more than one hundred films from 1963 to 2017.

He is particularly notable for his villain role in the 1973 film Karateci Kız where his character's dramatic and seemingly unending death —dubbed "Worst movie death scene ever"—became a viral hit, gaining millions of views since it was highlighted online in 2012. It was parodied in a Regular Show episode.

He died from colorectal cancer in 2017.

== Selected filmography ==
Year	Title	Role	Notes
1973	Karateci Kız		
1980	On Fertile Lands		
1981	Zübük		
1988	Devil, My Friend		
2000	Beans		
2001	Elephants and Grass		
2005	Pardon		
