= List of Turkish films of 1975 =

A list of films produced in Turkey in 1975 (see 1975 in film):

Name	Director	Starring	Distributed by	Type	Notes
Acele koca aranıyor					
Acı Severim Tatlı Döverim					
Adamını Bul					
A'dan Z'ye Kadar					
Ağrı Dağı Efsanesi					
Ah Mualla Oh Ne Ala					
Ah Bu Kadınlar					
Ah Nerede Vah Nerede					
Ah Nerede					
Ah Bu Gençlik					
Ah Ne Adem Dilli Badem					
Aklın Durur					
Alemin Keyfi Yerinde					
Amigo Hüsnü					
Ana Kurban Can Kurban					
Anasının Kızı					
Anahtarı Bendedir					
Anahtar Deliği					
Aptal Şampiyon					
Ateş Böceği					
Ayıkla Beni Hüsnü					
Azgın Bakireler					
Babacan					
Babaların Babası					
Babanın Oğlu					
Baba Bizi Eversene					
Bahtı Karalı Yarim					
Bak Yeşil Yeşil					
Bakireler Çiftliği					
Baldız					
Bana Beş Avrat Yetmez					
Batsın Bu Dünya					
Behçet 76					
Bekaret Kemeri					
Belalı Tatil					
Ben Armudu Dişlerim					
Beşine De Vur					
Beş Atış Yirmibeş					
Beş Milyoncuk Borç Verirmisin					
Bil Bakalım Ne Çıkacak					
Bir Defa Yetmez					
Bir Gün Mutlaka					
Bir Araya Gelemeyiz					
Bir Baba Hindi					
Bitirimler Sınıfı					
Bize Koca Gerekecek					
Bu Baba Başka Baba					
Bu Osman Başka Osman					
Bunalım					
Canavar Cafer					
Canım De Bana					
Cellat					
Cemil					
Civ Civ Çıkacak Kuş Çıkacak					
Curcuna					
Çalkala Yavrum Çalkala					
Çapkın Hırsız					
Çapkın Kızlar					
Çırılçıplak - Emanuella					
Çılgın Gençlik					
Çilli Yavrum Çilli					
Çin İşi Japon İşi					
Çirkef					
Çukulata Sevgilim					
Çukulata Tarlası					
Dadaş Fırat Geliyor					
Dadaş Hasan					
Dam Budalası					
Dam Üstünde Çul Serelim					
Delicesine					
Delisin					
Deli Deli Tepeli					
Deli Yusuf					
Deli Kız					
Derece Otuzyedi					
Durun Geliyorum					
Duyun Beni					
Dünden Bugüne Seks					
Elma Şekeri					
En Büyük Patron					
Enişte					
Erkek Kızım					
Erkeğim Benim					
Evcilik Oyunu					
Fırtına Behçet					
Fıstıklar					
Gece Kuşu Zehra					
Gelinin Ödü Patladı					
Gençlik Köprüsü					
Gerdek Gecesi					
Gördüğün Yerde Vur					
Gülşah					
Güler Misin Ağlar Mısın					
Hababam Sınıfı	Ertem Eğilmez				
Hababam Sınıfı Sınıfta Kaldı	Ertem Eğilmez				
Hababam Taburu					
Hababam Git Hababam Gel					
Halkalı Şeker					
Hanzo	Zeki Ökten	Kemal Sunal, Meral Zeren			
Harakiri					
Hamamcı Şevket					
Halime'nin Kızları					
Hasan Almaz Basan Alır					
Haşhaş					
Hayret 17					
Haydi Gençlik Hop Hop					
Hesap Günü					
Hızlım Benim					
Hoppaala					
Hopla Kalbim Hopla					
Horoz Gibi Maşallah					
Islak Dudaklar					
İki Tatlı Serseri					
İkimiz Bir Fidanız					
İnce Memed Vuruldu					
İnsan Avcısı					
İntihar					
İsyan					
İş Bilenin					
İşte Kapı İşte Sapı					
İşte Hayat					
İzin					
Kadınlar					
Kadınım					
Kadınlar Hayır Derse					
Kader Yolcuları					
Kara Şahin					
Kara Murat Kara Şövalyeye Karşı					
Kara Çarşaflı Kadın					
Kaynanalar					
Kaygısızlar (Tak Fişi Bitir İşi)					
Kazım Ne Lazım					
Kazıma Bak Kazıma					
Keloğlan İş Peşinde					
Kral Benim					
Kılıç Aslan					
Kıranlar Öder					
Kocam Erkek Mi					
Kokla Beni Melahat					
Kokla Ama Koparma					
Köçek					
Köprü					
Kutu					
Kuvvet Macunu					
Küçük Bey					
Macera					
Merhaba (Bizim Aile)	Ergin Orbey	Münir Özkul, Adile Naşit			
Minik Cadı					
Muz Sever Misiniz					
Namıdiğer Çolak					
Nereden Çıktı Bu Velet					
Nöri Gantar Ailesi					
Oh De Yavrum Oh De					
Oniki Çılgın Kız					
O'nun Hikayesi					
Oy Emine					
Ördek Çıkacak Kaz Çıkıcak					
Panik					
Parayla Değil Sırayla					
Pembe Panter					
Pembe Panter Gangsterlere Karşı					
Plaj Horozu					
Pisi Pisi					
Randevu					
Rejisörün Yatak Odası					
Salak Bacılar					
Sansar					
Sarı Necmiye (İt Adası)					
Sefer Seferde					
Seferim Var					
Seks ve Şantaj					
Sevişmek Bir Dakika					
Seveceksen Sev Artık					
Sevişerek Öldüler					
Sev Doya Doya					
Sevgili Halam					
Sevimli Frankeştayn					
Sınıfta Şenlik Var					
Sıra Sende Yosma					
Silahımda Altı Kurşun					
Soysuzlar					
Şafakta Buluşalım					
Şaşkın Damat	Zeki Ökten				
Şehvet Kurbanı Şevket					
Şeftali					
Şimdi Sıra Kimde					
Şipşak Basarım					
Şöhret Budalası					
Tadına Bakarım					
Tamam Mı Devam Mı					
Tantana Kemal					
Tatlı Cadı					
Tatlı Cadının Maceraları					
Tatlı Sert					
Tatlı Tatlı					
Tekerlek					
Televizyon Çoçuğu	Müjdat Gezen				
Teşekkür Ederim Büyük Anne					
Trafik Cemal					
Şeftalisi Ala Benziyor (Yirmidört Ayardayım)					
Şimdi Yavrum Şimdi					
Tokmak Nuri					
Tolga					
Tornovida Yaşar					
Turhanoğlu					
Üç Ahbap Çavuşlar					
Üç Gelin Altı Damat					
Üç Kağıtçılar					
Üç Yaman Bakire					
Vay Anasına					
Vur Davula Tokmağı					
Vur Tatlım					
Yakalarsam Severim					
Yarınlar Bizim					
Yarınlar Bizim (Aynı adla çekilen ikinci film)					
Yarınlar Kimin					
Yarın Olmaz Şimdi					
Yarış					
Yırt Kazım					
Yaşamak Daha Zor					
Yatak Hikayesi					
Ye Beni Mahmut					
Ye Kürküm Ye					
Yok Devenin Başı					
Zampara					
Zımbala Bilal (Her Yol Sana Helal)					

== See also ==
- 1975 in Turkey
