= Rüçhan Çamay =

Turkish singer (1931–2025)

- Born: 1 May 1931; Istanbul, Turkey
- Died: 9 July 2025 (aged 94); Istanbul, Turkey
- Occupations: Singer, actress

Rüçhan Çamay (Albanian: Rygjan Camaj; 1 May 1931 – 9 July 2025) was a Turkish singer and actress.

== Life and career ==
=== Early life ===
Çamay was born in Istanbul, the daughter of a Circassian mother and an Albanian father. At 12, she became a member of Ankara Radio Children's Club choir. After studying piano and singing at the Ankara University State Conservatory, she started his professional career in 1947.

=== Career ===
In the 1950s, Çamay collaborated with Istanbul Radio as a host of jazz programmes, and started appearing in films. She is regarded as the first Turkish singer to perform on television, as in 1953, when television had not yet been introduced in Turkey, she was a guest of The Linkletter Show on CBS. In 1968, she released her first album, Gölgen Yeter Bana ('Your Shadow is Enough for Me'). She reached the peak of her popularity in the mid-1970s, thanks to hit songs like "Para Parra Parrra" and "Ne Haber?".

=== Personal life and death ===
In 1953, Çamay married the film director and producer Turgut Demirağ, with whom she had two daughters. Her daughter Melike Demirağ became a popular political singer, but was banned from Turkey following the 1980 Turkish coup d'état, and forced to relocate in West Germany; Çamay herself faced repercussions and was forbidden from leaving and traveling abroad.

Çamay died on 9 July 2025, at the age of 94. She was buried at Zincirlikuyu Cemetery.
