= Yaman Okay =

Turkish actor (1951–1993)

- Born: 24 August 1951; Giresun, Turkey
- Died: 19 February 1993 (aged 41); Istanbul, Turkey
- Resting place: Zincirlikuyu Cemetery
- Occupation: Actor
- Spouse: Meral Okay (m. 1984)

Yaman Okay (24 August 1951 – 19 February 1993) was a Turkish actor. He won the 1981 Golden Orange Award for Best Supporting Actor for his performance in On Fertile Lands.

Okay was married in 1984 to actress and screenwriter Meral Okay. He died of pancreatic cancer in 1993 and was buried in the Zincirlikuyu Cemetery.

== Selected filmography ==
Film
Year	Title	Role	Notes
1978	The Herd		
1979	The Sacrifice		
1980	On Fertile Lands		
1984	Pehlivan		
1990	Journey of Hope		
1990	Tatar Ramazan		
1991	Piano Piano Kid		
1992	Walking After Midnight	Nafiz	
