= Karateci Kız =

- Poster
- Directed by: Orhan Aksoy
- Written by: Fuat Özlüer; Erdoğan Tünaş
- Produced by: Türker İnanoğlu
- Starring: Filiz Akın; Ediz Hun; Bülent Kayabaş; Hayati Hamzaoğlu; Yeşim Yükselen
- Distributed by: Erler Film
- Release date: 17 December 1973
- Running time: 90 minutes
- Country: Turkey
- Language: Turkish
- Budget: $15,083.24

Karateci Kız (transl. Karate Girl) is a 1973 Turkish martial arts film. Directed by Orhan Aksoy, the cast includes Filiz Akın and Ediz Hun.

In September 2012, the film gained notoriety in a viral video on YouTube that features the main character Zeynep (played by Akın) fatally shooting antagonist Ferruh Durak (played by Bülent Kayabaş) multiple times as he lets out several drawn-out screams before dying. The video, entitled "Worst movie death scene ever", had gained more than 17 million views since being uploaded on 25 September 2012 before being deleted on copyright grounds. The clip was edited from the original to add the long screams.

== Plot ==
Zeynep lives with her old father. She has lost her ability to speak because of an accident. She needs an operation in order to be able to talk again. One day, five prison fugitives come to their house and kill Zeynep's father. The fugitives take their money and attack. Due to the shock, Zeynep regains her ability to speak. The fugitives are arrested but Zeynep wants to take revenge, therefore she says that the fugitives are not the ones who have attacked them. The police appoints Murat to make her give a statement. Murat teaches her how to use a gun and some karate, but she still doesn't know he is a cop. They fall in love and decide to get married. On their wedding, the prisoners kill Murat. Nothing can stop Zeynep now from taking revenge. She becomes a policewoman and traces the fugitives one by one.

== Cast ==
- Filiz Akın as Zeynep
- Ediz Hun as Murat Akdoğan
- Hayati Hamzaoğlu as Bekir Bulut
- Bülent Kayabaş as Ferruh Durak
- Nubar Terziyan as Zeynep's Father
- Yesim Yükselen as Meral
- Kudret Karadağ as Riza Çakoz
- Oktay Yavuz as Kasim Arpaci

== See also ==
- Bruceploitation
- Kung fu film
- Turksploitation
