= Kenan Korkmaz =

Turkish filmmaker

Kenan Korkmaz (born April 21, 1969 in Diyarbakır, Turkey) is a Turkish filmmaker, educated at Çukurova University where he has also lectured in cinematography and photography. His first feature film, Lüks Otel (The Luxury Hotel) won the 2011 award Golden Orange for Best Cinematographer and the jury´s special awards for Best Film and Best Music at the 48th International Antalya Golden Orange Film Festival . Korkmaz was the director of photography for the 2013 feature film Yola Çıkmak. (Take the Road) directed by Evren Erdem. For the 2014 feature film Gittiler 'Sair ve Mechul' (Gone 'The Other and the Unknown´), Korkmaz was responsible for script, directing, photography and editing.

== Filmography ==
- Gittiler 'Sair ve Mechul' (2014) Feature film, 1 hr 37 min
- Yola Çikmak (2013) Feature film, 1 hr 30 min (as director of photography)
- Lüks Otel (2011) Feature film, 1 hr 32 min
