= Beans (2000 film) =

2000 Turkish crime comedy film by Bora Tekay

- Film poster
- Turkish: Fasulye
- Directed by: Bora Tekay
- Written by: Haluk Özenç
- Produced by: Ozgur Ercan, Kaan Kural, Haluk Özenç, Bora Tekay
- Cinematography: Mehmet Zengin
- Edited by: Ahmet Can, Ahmet Ilgaz
- Distributed by: Ozen Film
- Release date: 8 December 2000
- Running time: 105 minutes
- Country: Turkey
- Language: Turkish

Beans (Turkish: Fasulye) is a 2000 Turkish comedy mafia film directed by Bora Tekay and written by Haluk Özenç.

== Cast ==
- Selim Erdoğan as The young man
- Elvin Beşikçioğlu as The girl
- Bülent Kayabaş as The boss
- Burak Sergen as The killer or 'The one without milk'
- Taner Barlas as The father
- Haluk Özenç as The courier or 'The one with milk'
- Haluk Bilginer as The imaginary old man
- Özlem Eren as Sister
- Gürkan Uygun
