= She Is Such a Woman =

Öyle bir kadın ki
- Directed by: Naki Yurter
- Written by: Recep Filiz
- Produced by: Erdoğan Tilav
- Starring: Zerrin Doğan, Levent Günsel, Zafir Seba, Yılmaz Şahin
- Cinematography: Sedat Ülker
- Distributed by: Gaye Film
- Release date: 1979
- Country: Turkey
- Language: Turkish

Öyle Bir Kadın Ki(She Is Such a Woman) (1979) is the first Turkish film which included a hardcore scene to be legally produced and distributed.

The plot claims to deal with the sexual ambivalence of married couples on vacation, accompanied by a crime story. The movie started a short-lived, but intense period of pornography in Turkey until the 1980 Turkish coup d'état. Today, it is difficult to find the original, uncut version. Directed by Naki Yurter (Yani Veligradino), the lead role was played by Zerrin Doğan.
