= Fidan =

Fidan is a feminine given name and surname of Turkish origin meaning "sapling". It was among the most popular names for girls born in 2008 in Azerbaijan. Notable people with the name include:

== Given name ==
- Fidan Aghayeva-Edler, Azerbaijani pianist
- Fidan Aliti (born 1993), Swiss-Albanian footballer
- Fidan Alizada (born 2005), Azerbaijani judoka
- Fidan Doğan (1982–2013), Turkish activist
- Fidan Gasimova (born 1947), Azerbaijani singer
- Fidan Gurbanli (born 2010), Azerbaijani rhythmic gymnast
- Fidan Haciyeva (born 1976), Azerbaijani opera singer
- Fidan Jafarova (born 2004), Azerbaijani footballer
- Fidan Ögel (born 2002), Turkish judoka

== Surname ==
- Hakan Fidan (born 1968), Turkish politician
- Hikmet Fidan (1955–2005), Turkish politician
