= 48th International Antalya Golden Orange Film Festival =

2011 Turkish film festival

- Festival Poster
- Location: Antalya, Turkey
- Awards: Golden Orange
- Festival date: October 8–14, 2011
- Website: http://www.altinportakal.org.tr/en/index.html

Antalya Film Festival
- 47th

The 48th International Antalya Golden Orange Film Festival (Turkish: 48. Uluslararası Antalya Altın Portakal Film Festivali) was a film festival held in Antalya, Turkey from October 8 to 14, 2011. Films were shown with the theme "...And the Woman Touched the World" focusing on women and the violence that women face in their daily lives. The Golden Orange selection committees, including the International and National Competition Juries, were entirely composed of female members for the first time in the festival's history.

This edition of the International Antalya Golden Orange Film Festival was the third to be organised solely by the Antalya Foundation for Culture and Arts (AKSAV), a cultural body affiliated with the Antalya Greater Municipality. The festival opened with a ceremony at the Cam Piramit Congress and Exhibition Center on October 7, 2011 at which the honorary awards were presented, songs were sung by Jane Birkin and Zuhal Olcay, and Azerbaijani director Rustam Ibragimbekov was guest of honour.

Competitions were also run for the cancelled 16th (1979) and 17th (1980) editions of the festival with Belated Golden Oranges (Turkish: Geç Gelen Altın Portallar) being presented to the winners.

== Awards ==
=== National Feature Film Competition Awards ===
- Best Film: Good Days to Come (Turkish: Güzel Günler Göreceğiz) directed by Hasan Tolga Pulat
- Best First Film: Zenne Dancer (Turkish: Zenne) directed by M. Caner Alper & Mehmet Binay
- Best Director: Cigdem Vitrinel for What Remains (Turkish: Geriye Kalan)
- Best Script: Emre Kavuk for Good Days to Come (Turkish: Güzel Günler Göreceğiz)
- Best Cinematographer: Kenan Korkmaz for The Luxury Hotel (Turkish: Lüks Otel) and Norayr Casper for Zenne Dancer (Turkish: Zenne)
- Best Music: Frank Schreiber & Hemin Derya for The Walk (Turkish: Yürüyüş)
- Best Actress: Devin Ozgur Cinar for What Remains (Turkish: Geriye Kalan)
- Best Actor: Erdal Besikcioglu for Behzat Ç. I Buried You in My Heart (Turkish: Behzat Ç. Seni Kalbime Gömdüm)
- Best Supporting Actress: Tilbe Saran for Zenne Dancer (Turkish: Zenne) & Nesrin Cavadzade for Good Days to Come (Turkish: Güzel Günler Göreceğiz)
- Best Supporting Actor: Erkan Avcı for Zenne Dancer (Turkish: Zenne)
- Best Editor: Kalendar Hasan for Good Days to Come (Turkish: Güzel Günler Göreceğiz)
- Best Art Director: Giyasettin Sehir for The Walk (Turkish: Yürüyüş)

== Competition Sections ==
=== National Feature Film Competition ===
Thirteen Turkish films made in the preceding year were selected by the Pre-Evaluation Board from the 45 eligible to compete in the festival’s National Feature Film Competition.

==== National Feature Film Competition Jury ====
- Jury Head: Müjde Ar (Turkish actress)
- Handan İpekçi (Turkish director)
- Vahide Gördüm (Turkish actress - unable to attend for health reasons)
- Bergüzar Korel (Turkish actress)
- Ayşe Kulin (Turkish author)
- Yasar Seyman (Turkish author)
- Annie Geelmuyden Pertan (artistic director)
- Şevval Sam (Turkish musician and actress)
- Melis Behlil (Turkish film critic / academic)
- Serpil Kırel (Turkish academic)
- Çiğdem Anad (Turkish journalist)

==== National Feature Film Competition Selection ====
- Behzat Ç. I Buried You in My Heart (Turkish: Behzat Ç. Seni Kalbime Gömdüm) directed by Serdar Akar
- Can directed by Raşit Çelikezer
- The Monsters' Dinner (Turkish: Canavarlar Sofrası) directed by Ramin Matin
- Altruist (Turkish: Fedakar) directed by Hüseyin Eleman
- What Remains (Turkish: Geriye Kalan) directed by Çiğdem Vitrinel
- Good Days to Come (Turkish: Güzel Günler Göreceğiz) directed by Hasan Tolga Pulat
- Which Movie? (Turkish: Hangi Film) directed by Egemen Sancak
- Hicaz directed by Erdal Rahmi Hanay
- The Luxury Hotel (Turkish: Lüks Otel) directed by Kenan Korkmaz
- Pomegranate (Turkish: Nar) directed by Ümit Ünal
- Requiem for Foresight (Turkish: Öngörüye Ağıt) directed by Savaş Baykal
- The Walk (Turkish: Yürüyüş) directed by Shiar Abdi
- Zenne Dancer (Turkish: Zenne) directed by M. Caner Alper & Mehmet Binay

== See also ==
- Turkish films of 2011
- 2011 in film
