= Depression: The Woman Who Lives at Night =

Pornographic film

Depression: The Woman Who Lives at Night (tr. Bunalım - Gece Yaşayan Kadın) is the second feature-length pornographic film in the Turkish cinema, shot in 1979. Yavuz Figenli is the director of movie. The leading roles are played by Dilber Ay, Hakan Özer, Ata Saka and Güven Gül.

== Specifications ==
It is a quality production in many respects. The film has an interesting subject and tells the life of a young girl with double personality. The quality of the shot and the atmosphere created are remarkable. Later, it was censored and released as an erotic movie with its shortened version.

== Plot ==
Necla is a young girl who cannot walk because she is disabled. In fact, she has a double personality and sometimes wears black clothes and a red wig, then turns into a different person. In contrast to her first resentful and tired personality, she is now a vamp character. Moreover, she walks very comfortably when she switches to her second personality. They are in love with her neighbor, painter Fikret, who lives in a house in a nearby garden. And Necla, who takes on her other personality, goes to her at night. After a while, Necla kills her lover Fikret. The blame falls on her sister Selma. However, Selma's psychiatrist husband Kemal begins to investigate the matter. Throughout the movie, the sex scenes between Necla and Fikret are shown. Also in addition, the scenes between Kemal and Selma.

== Duration ==
The longest known running time of this film is 1 hour and 20 minutes. However, there is information suggesting that there are at least 7-10 minutes of additional scenes. (This is due to differences between the theatrical version and various VHS or VCD versions.) So, the possible complete extended duration of the film is approximately 1 hour and 30 minutes.

There are at least three (or perhaps even four) versions of the film released.

1. Version with all sexually explicit scenes cut out. (35 min)
2. Erotic / Softcore version. (55 min)
3. A slightly shorter version with some scenes missing. (maybe 70 minutes)
4. Uncut full film. (80 min)
- The film's total running time across its different versions is estimated at 90 minutes.

== Bibliography ==
- Agâh Özgüç, Ansiklopedik Türk Filmleri Sözlüğü, Horizon International Yayınları, 2012. (in Turkish)
- Agâh Özgüç, Türk Filmleri Sözlüğü 1917–2009, T. C. Kültür ve Turizm Bakanlığı ve SESAM Yayınevi, 2009.(in Turkish)
- Türker İnanoğlu, 5555 Afişle Türk Sineması, Kabalcı Yayınevi, 2004.(in Turkish)
- Utku Uluer, "Gece Yaşayan Kadın" Filmi İncelemesi (makale), 2019.(in Turkish)

== See also ==
- Cinema of Turkey
