= Happy Days (1978 film) =

- Directed by: Orhan Aksoy
- Starring: Münir Özkul; Adile Naşit
- Release date: 1978
- Running time: 1h 32min
- Country: Turkey
- Language: Turkish

Happy Days (Turkish: Neşeli Günler) is a 1978 Turkish comedy film directed by Orhan Aksoy.

== Plot ==
It tells the story of a husband and wife divorced because of a ridiculous issue. Husband and wife, who produce and sell pickles, are constantly fighting. One day, they get divorced after arguing over whether to make pickle juice better with vinegar or lemon juice. Three of the children stay with their mother and the other three with their father. They do not see each other for years. One day, everything changes when the truth of two brothers who fight without knowing each other by chance. All siblings try to reconcile their parents. The environment gets mixed up with the lies of Ziya, the pickle maker man's brother.

== Cast ==
- Münir Özkul - Kazim
- Adile Naşit - Saadet
- Şener Şen - Ziya
- Ayşen Gruda - Nilgun
- Oya Aydoğan - Zeynep
- Ahmet Sezerel - Ugur

== Bibliography ==
- Neşeli Günler, Beyazperde - "Özet", Access date: 15 May 2022 (in Turkish)
