= Tarık Akan =

Turkish actor and film producer

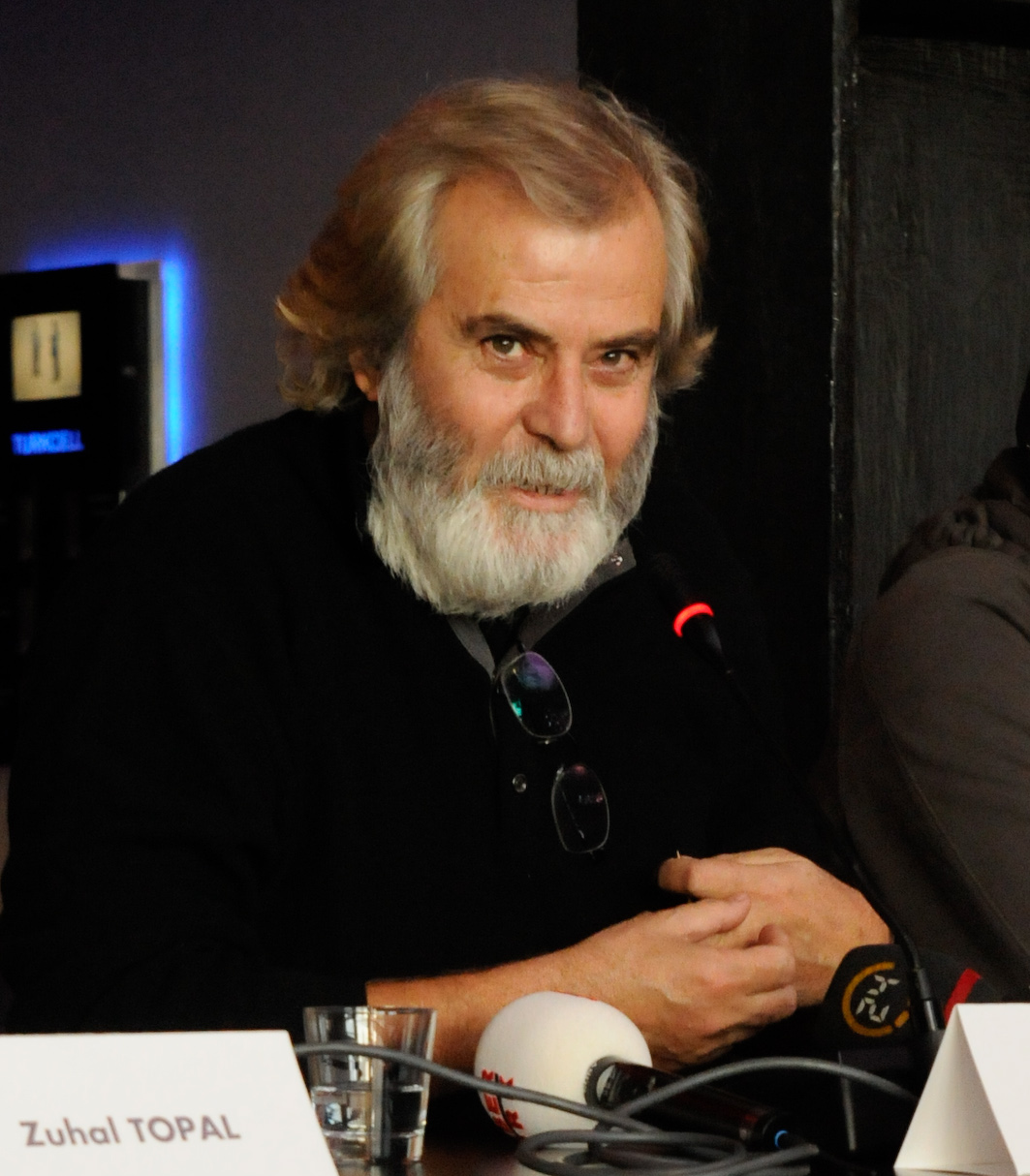
- Akan in 2008
- Born: Tarık Tahsin Üregül; 13 December 1949; Istanbul, Turkey
- Died: 16 September 2016 (aged 66); Istanbul, Turkey
- Education: Yıldız Technical University, College of Journalism
- Occupations: Actor; director
- Years active: 1965–2009
- Notable work: My Dear Brother (1973); Hababam Sınıfı (1975); Ah Nerede (1975); The Herd (1978); Yol (1982); Karartma Geceleri (1990)
- Spouse: Yasemin Erkut (m. 1986; div. 1989)
- Children: 3
- Awards: Golden Orange Film Festival (7); Golden Butterfly Awards (1); Golden Boll Film Festival (1); Berlin International Film Festival (1)

Tarık Akan (born Tarık Tahsin Üregül; 13 December 1949 – 16 September 2016) was a Turkish film actor and producer, who started his activity in 1965.

== Early life ==
Akan was born as Tarık Tahsin Üregül in Istanbul on 13 December 1949. He was the third child of the family after a daughter and a son. His family was constantly moving around Turkey due to his father's occupation in the military. Schooled in Erzurum, he completed the elementary education in Kayseri. Following his father's retirement, the family moved to Istanbul and settled in Bakırköy. Akan attended Yıldız Technical University to study mechanical engineering, graduated later from the College of Journalist.

Before he started his acting career, he worked as a lifeguard at beaches and at a boat renting place in Bakırköy.

He completed his military service in Denizli in 1979.

He was jailed for two-and-half months with cell confinement following the 1980 Turkish coup d'état. A right-wing politics daily defamed him with a false news in the headline for a speech he allegedly addressed in Germany in early 1981, leading to a long court case demanding for 12 years imprisonment.

In 1986, he married Yasemin Erkut. He became father of a son, Barış Zeki Üregül, the same year. Two years later, twins, Yaşar Özgür, a son, and Özlem, a daughter, were born. The couple divorced in 1989.

His son Barış Zeki began an acting career in 2009 with the film Deli Deli Olma, in which he played with his father and portrayed the young actor Tarık Akan.

== Acting career ==
He entered a movie actor contest of the magazine Ses ("Voice"), and ended up runner up. He studied acting under the eye of famous Turkish film director Ertem Eğilmez (1929–1989) and entered into the "list of unforgettables" with Hababam Sınıfı, Bizim Aile, Canım Kardeşim.

He made his film debut in 1971 at the age of 21 in Solan Bir Yaprak Gibi, and adopted the stage name "Tarık Akan". Between 1970 and 1975, in the heyday of Yeşilçam, he acted in 12 films a year in average. He appeared with his ex-girlfriend Emel Sayın in "Mavi Boncuk", "Yalancı Yarim", Hülya Koçyiğit in "Sev Kardeşim", "Yeryüzünde Bir Melek", Filiz Akın in Tatlı Dillim, Necla Nazır in "Delisin", "Ateş Böceği".

At first, most of his roles were in romantic comedies and his partner is Gülşen Bubikoğlu in many films. Later in his career, he has taken on more political and dramatic roles. The first film of this genre was Nehir, in which he shared the role with Cüneyt Arkın. Political films like Maden, Sürü, Yol and Kanal followed.

He acted in a total of 110 films, and won numerous awards from various festivals including Cannes and Berlin. He won an Honourable Mention at the 35th Berlin International Film Festival for his role in Pehlivan.

== Later years ==
He also directed several productions such as documentaries and serials for television. In 2002, he published his first book Anne Kafamda Bit Var, a biography of his life and his time in prison.

In 1991, he took over the elementary school in Bakırköy, in which he was educated, and transferred it to his own Özel Taş İlköğretim Okulu.

In 2005, he became the chairman of the education-aimed "Nesin Foundation", succeeding Ali Nesin, the son of the founder Aziz Nesin. In his later years, he was served as chairman of the "Nazım Hikmet Cultural and Arts Foundation".

== Illness and death ==
Akan contracted lung cancer, and was in treatment for over one year. In the early hours of 16 September 2016, he died at the age of 66 in the intensive care station of a private hospital in Istanbul.

On 18 September, he was interred at Zuhuratbaba Cemetery in Bakırköy following a memorial service held in Harbiye Muhsin Ertuğrul Stage and the religious funeral service at Teşvikiye Mosque. The funeral was attended by thousands of people, his castmates, former President of Turkey Ahmet Necdet Sezer and the leader of the main opposition party Kemal Kılıçdaroğlu.

== Filmography ==
Year	Film	Role	Note
1971	Solan Bir Yaprak Gibi		Debut role;
1971	Melek mi, Şeytan mı?		
1971	Beyoğlu Güzeli		
1971	Emine		
1971	Vefasız		
1972	Suçlu		
1972	Üç Sevgili		
1972	Tatlı Dillim		
1972	Sisli Hatıralar		
1972	Sev Kardeşim		
1972	Kaderimin Oyunu		
1972	Azat Kuşu		
1972	Aşkların En Güzeli		
1973	Feryat		
1973	Para		
1973	Canım Kardeşim		
1973	Umut Dünyası		
1973	Yeryüzünde Bir Melek		
1973	Yalancı Yarim		
1973	Oh Olsun		
1973	Bebek Yüzlü		
1974	Esir Hayat		
1974	Boşver Arkadaş		
1974	Kanlı Deniz		
1974	Mahçup Delikanlı		
1974	Yaz Bekarı		
1974	Memleketim		
1974	The Blue Bead		
1975	Delisin		
1975	Hababam Sınıfı	Damat Ferit	
1975	Bizim Aile		
1975	Gece Kuşu Zehra		
1975	Evcilik Oyunu		
1975	Çapkın Hırsız		
1975	Ateş Böceği		
1975	Ah Nerede		
1976	Hababam Sınıfı Sınıfta Kaldı		
1976	Öyle Olsun		
1976	Kader Bağlayınca		
1976	Aşk Dediğin Laf Değildir		
1976	Canı / Polizia selvaggia		Bilingual film
1977	Bizim Kız		
1977	Sevgili Dayım		
1977	Babanin Evlatlari		Bilingual film
1977	Baraj		
1977	Şeref Sözü		
1977	Nehir		
1978	Lekeli Melek		
1978	Sürü		
1978	Seninle Son Defa		
1978	Maden		
1978	The Canal		
1979	Demiryol		
1979	Adak		
1981	Herhangi Bir Kadın		
1981	Delikan		
1982	Yol		
1982	Arkadaşım		
1982	Kaçak		
1983	Gecenin Sonu		
1983	Derman		
1983	Çocuklar Çiçektir		
1983	Beyaz Ölüm		
1984	Yosma		
1984	Pehlivan		
1984	Kayıp Kızlar		
1984	Damga		
1984	Alev Alev		
1985	Tele Kızlar		
1985	Son Darbe		
1985	Paramparça		
1985	Kan		
1985	Bir Avuç Cennet		
1986	Kıskıvrak		
1986	Ses		
1986	Halkali köle		
1986	Beyoğlu`nun Arka Yakası		
1986	Adem ile Havva		
1986	Acı Dünyalar		
1987	Su da yanar		
1987	Yağmur Kaçakları		
1987	Skandal		
1987	Kızımın Kanı		
1987	çark		
1988	Üçüncü göz		
1988	Kimlik		
1988	El Kapilari		
1988	Dönüş		
1989	Leyla İle Mecnun		Bilingual film;
1989	Isa Musa Meryem		
1990	İkili Oyunlar		
1990	Karartma Geceleri		
1990	Bir Küçük Bulut		
1990	Berdel		
1991	Uzun ince Bir Yol		
1991	Sîyabend û Xecê		Kurdish-language film
1991	Bir Kadın Düşmanı		
1991	Devlerin Ölümü		
1993	Yolcu		
1993	Çözülmeler		
1995	Aşk Üzerine Söylenmemiş Herşey-Hep Aynı		
1997	Mektup		
1999	Hayal kurma oyunlari		
1999	Eylül Fırtınası		
2002	Meşrutiyet - Abdülhamit Düşerken		
2003	Gülüm		
2003	Vizontele Tuuba		
2006	Ankara cinayeti		
2009	Deli Deli Olma		
2009	Karşıyaka Memleket	Nazir Hikmet	Final role

Awards
Preceded by Murat Soydan	Golden Orange Award for Best Actor; 1973 for Suçlu	Succeeded by Hakan Balamir
Preceded by Kemal Sunal	Golden Orange Award for Best Actor; 1978 for Maden	Succeeded by not awarded
Preceded by Genco Erkal	Golden Orange Award for Best Actor; 1984 for Pehlivan	Succeeded by Hakan Balamir
Preceded by Aytaç Arman	Golden Orange Award for Best Actor; 1989 for Üçüncü Göz 1990 for Karartma Geceleri	Succeeded by Ekrem Bora
Preceded by not held	Golden Boll Award for Best Actor; 1992 for Karartma Geceleri	Succeeded by Menderes Samancılar
Preceded by Fırat Tanış	Golden Orange Award for Best Actor; 2003 for Gülüm	Succeeded by Olgun Şimşek
