= List of Turkish films of 1970 =

A list of films produced in Turkey in 1970 (see 1970 in film):

Name	Director	Starring	Distributed by	Type	Notes
Acımak					
Adım Beladır					
Adım Kan Soyadım Silah					
Afacan					
Ağlayan Melek					
Ah Müjgan Ah					
Akrep Tuzağı					
Alçaklar Affedilmez					
Ali İle Veli					
Allı Yemeni					
Altın Tabancalı Adam					
Amber					
Ana Gibi Yar Olmaz					
Anadolu Kini					
Ankara Ekspresi					
Arkadaşlık Öldü Mü					
Arım Balım Peteğim			Sine Film		
Aslan Yürekli Mahkum					
Asi Ve Cesur					
Aşk Ve Tabanca					
Aşk Arzu Silah					
Aşk Sürgünü					
Aşktan da Üstün					
Adsız Cengaver	Halit Refiğ, Hasan Sasanpour				Iranian-Turkish co-production
Avare					
Avare Aşık					
Ayşecik Sana Tapıyorum					
Babaların Günahı					
Bela Çiçekleri					
Beleşçi Murat					
Berduş Kız					
Beyaz Güller					
Beyaz Tabakta Siyah Üzüm					
Bırakın Öldüreyim					
Bir Çuval Para	Yücel Uçanoğlu		Topakpı Film	Adventure, Western	
Birleşen Yollar					
Bir Lokma Ekmek					
Bomba Ahmet					
Bu Yumruk Sana					
Buğulu Gözler					
Bülbül Yuvası					
Bütün Aşklar Tatlı Başlar					
Cafer Bey			Erman Film		
Canlı Hedef					
Casus Kıran (Yedi Canlı Adam)					
Cehennemde Şenlik Var					
Cemo					
Ceylan Emine					
Cilalı İbo Almanya'da					
Civan Ali					
Çalınmış Hayat					
Çarşambayı Sel Aldı					
Çeko	Çetin İnanç	Yılmaz Köksal, Ahmet Mekin	Erman Film	Western, Adventure	
Çifte Yürekli					
Çileli Bülbül					
Dağların Kartalı					
Damarımda Kanımsın					
Darıldın Mı Cicim Bana					
Deli Ormanlı					
Devler Geliyor					
Dikkat Kan Aranıyor			Arzu Film		
Donanma Kamil					
Dönme Bana Sevgilim					
Dört Kabadayı					
Duyduk Duymadık Demeyin					
Düşen Bir Yaprak Gibi					
Ecelin Gölgesinde					
Ecel Teri					
Erkek Gibi Ölenler					
Erkeklik Öldü Mü Abiler					
Eşkıya Oğlu					
Eyvah					
Fadime	Türker İnanoğlu			Comedy, Romance, Adventure	Turkish-Iranian co-production film
Fedailer					
Ferhat İle Şirin / Shirin va Farhad			Erler Film		Turkish-Iranian co-production film
Fırtına Adam					
Fıstık Gibi					
Firari Aşıklar					
Gelin Kızı					
Gölgedeki Adam					
Gönül Meyhanesi					
Gülüm Nuri					
Günahımı Çekeceksin					
Günahsız Katiller					
Güller Ve Dikenler					
Güzel Şoför	Mahmoud Koushan, Mehmet Bozkuş	Filiz Akın, Amir Fakhraddim Shirazi, Homayoun, Hulusi Kentmen	Erler Film	Comedy, Drama, Romance	Iranian-Turkish co-production film, an adaptation of Johnny Belinda 1948
Ham Meyva					
Hayatımı Mahveden Kadın					
Hayatım Sana Feda					
Hedefte İki Kişi					
Her Günaha Bir Kurşun					
Herkesin Sevgilisi					
Hippi Perihan					
Hoş Memo					
İç Güveysi					
İki Aşk Arasında					
İki Cesur Adam					
İmzam Kanla Yazılır					
İntikam Derler Adıma					
İntikam Meleği					
İste Kölen Olayım					
İşler Karışık					
İşportacı Kız				Comedy, Adventure	Turkish-Iranian co-production film
Kaçak					
Kaderim					
Kader Bağlayınca					
Kaderin Ağları					
Kaderin Oyunu					
Kaderin Pençesinde					
Kadın Satılmaz					
Kafkas Şahini					
Kalbimin Efendisi					
Kan Ve Tabanca				Drama, Crime	
Kan Kusturacağım					
Kan Yağmuru					
Kan Ve Kurşun					
Kanlı Kader					
Kanun Kaçakları					
Kanıma Kan İsterim					
Kanımın Son Damlasına Kadar					
Kanunsuz Kardeşler					
Kara Gözlüm					
Kara Dutum					
Kara Leke					
Kara Peçe					
Kelebek					
Kendim Ettim Kendim Buldum					
Kezban Roma'da			Erman Film		
Kralların Öfkesi					
Kralların Kaderi					
Kıskanırım Seni					
Kızgın Topraklar					
Kızım Sana Emanet					
Kiralık Katiller					
Koçum Ali					
Koreli Kemal					
Kör Düğüm					
Köyün Beş Güzeli					
Köye Giden Yosma					
Kurt Kanı					
Küçük Hanımın Şoförü					
Küçük Hanımefendi					
Linç					
Mağrur Kadın					
Malkoçoğlu Cem Sultan	Remzi Aydın Jöntürk, Hasan Sasanpour	Cüneyt Arkın, Pouri Banayi, Cihangir Ghaffari, Feri Cansel	Duru Film	Historical, Adventure	Iranian-Turkish co-production
Maskeli Şeytan	Yılmaz Atadeniz	Irfan Atasoy, Feri Cansel, Behçet Nacar, Muzaffer Tema	Irfan Film	Adventure, Action, Superhero	
Mazi Kalbimde Bir Yaradır					
Meçhul Kadın					
Merhamet					
Müthiş Türk					
On Kadına Bir Erkek					
Onu Allah Affetsin					
Öksüz Gülnaz					
Ölüm Çemberi					
Ölüm Emri			Metin Film		
Ölüm Fermanı	Kemal Kan, Hassan Sasanpour		Topkapı Film	Adventure Western, Comedy	Turkish-Iranian co-production film
Ölüm Pazarı					
Ölüler Konuşmaz Ki					
Ölünceye Kadar					
Öleceksek Ölelim					
Öldürmeye Yeminliyim					
Öp Beni					
Pamuk Prenses Ve Yedi Cüceler					
Paralı Askerler					
Piyade Osman					
Püsküllü Bela					
Red Kit					
Saadet Güneşi			Acar Film		
Saadet Şehri					
Selahattin Eyyübi					Turkish-Iranian co-production film
Sende Bizdensin					
Sevenler Ölmez					
Sevimli Serseri					
Seven Ne Yapmaz					
Sevgilim Mazurka					
Sevgili Muhafızım					
Son Günah			Kemal Film		
Son Nefes					
Son Söz Benim					
Son Kızgın Adam					
Sonsuz İhtiras					
Sosyete Şakir					
Söz Müdafanın					
Sürtük					
Şampiyon					
Şeytan Kayaları					
Şıllık					
Şimşek Hafiye					
Şoför Nebahat					
Talihsiz Baba					
Talihsiz Yavru Fatoş					
Tarkan: Gümüş Eyer					
Tatlı Hayat					
Tatlı Meleğim					
Tehlikeli Oyun					
Turist Ömer Yamyamlar Arasında					
Umut					
Üç Kral Serseri					
Vur Okşa Ve Öp					
Vur Patlasın Çal Oynasın					
Yaban Gülü					
Yanık Kezban					
Yarım Kalan Saadet	Türker İnanoğlu	Cüneyt Arkın, Filiz Akın, Zuhal Aktan, Önder Somer	Erler Film	Musical drama	An adaptation of Saathi which was remake of Palum Pazhamum
Yaralı Ceylan					
Yaslı Gelin					
Yaşamak Kolay Değil					
Yaşamak İçin					
Yaşamak İçin Öldüreceksin					
Yavrum			Arzu Film		
Yazı Mı Tura Mı					
Yedi Belalılar					
Yemende Bir Avuç Türk					
Yeşil Kurbağalar					
Yılan Kadın					
Yiğitlerin Türküsü					
Yiğitlerin Dönüşü					
Yumurcak Köprüaltı Çocuğu					
Yumruk Pazarı					
Yuvasız Kuşlar					
Zalim					
Zeyno					
Zeynom					
Zindandan Gelen Mektup					

== See also ==
- 1970 in Turkey
