= Ah Nerede =

1975 film directed by Orhan Aksoy

- Directed by: Orhan Aksoy
- Starring: Tarık Akan; Gülşen Bubikoğlu
- Release date: 1975
- Running time: 1h 30min
- Country: Turkey
- Language: Turkish

Ah Nerede is a 1975 film revolving around romantic comedy directed by Orhan Aksoy.

== Cast ==
- Tarık Akan - Ferit
- Gülşen Bubikoğlu - Zehra
- Nilgün Atılgan - Aysel
- Aydan Adan - Selin
- Adile Naşit - Huriye
- Serpil Nur - Selin's sister
- Hulusi Kentmen - Ferit's father
- Şükriye Atav - Ferit's mother
- Hayati Hamzaoğlu - Ali Kaya
- Halit Akçatepe - Murat
