= The Canal (1979 film) =

1979 film

- Directed by: Erden Kıral
- Written by: Ihsan Yüce
- Starring: Tarik Akan
- Cinematography: Salih Dikisçi
- Release date: August 1979
- Country: Turkey
- Language: Turkish

The Canal (Turkish: Kanal) is a 1979 Turkish drama film directed by Erden Kıral. It was entered into the 11th Moscow International Film Festival.

== Cast ==
- Tarik Akan as The lieutenant governor
- Meral Orhonsay as Zeynep, the physician
- Kamran Usluer as Haþim Aga
- Tuncel Kurtiz as Abuzer
- Ali Demir
- Menderes Samancilar
