= The Sacrifice (1979 film) =

- Directed by: Atıf Yılmaz
- Written by: Başar Sabuncu; Faruk Erem
- Produced by: Atıf Yılmaz
- Starring: Tarık Akan; Necla Nazır; Gökhan Mete; Yaman Okay; Deniz Türkali
- Cinematography: İzzet Akay
- Music by: Yalçın Tura
- Release date: 1979
- Running time: 82 minutes
- Country: Turkey
- Language: Turkish

The Sacrifice (Turkish: Adak) is a 1979 Turkish drama film, directed by Atıf Yılmaz and written by Başar Sabuncu based on a true story by Faruk Erem, featuring a peasant who sacrifices his youngest child to God. The "pathological tale," according to Rekin Teksoy, "focuses on superstitious belief through the interjection of eyewitness accounts." It was scheduled to compete in the cancelled 17th Antalya Golden Orange Film Festival, for which it received Belated Golden Oranges for Best Screenplay and Best Actor.

== Awards ==
17th Antalya Golden Orange Film Festival:

- Belated Golden Orange for Best Screenplay: Başar Sabuncu (won)
- Belated Golden Orange for Best Actor: Tarık Akan (won, also for The Herd, shared with Aytaç Arman for The Enemy)
