= List of Turkish films of the 2020s =

This is a list of Turkish films of the 2020s.

== Streaming original films ==
2025
Film	Note
Başka Bir Sen	Disney film
Kalendar Pide	Disney film
Umami	Disney film
2024
Film	Note
3.Gün	Amazon Prime film
39 Derecede Aşk	Amazon Prime film
Dilemma	Amazon Prime film
Kül	Netflix film
Mavi Mağara	Amazon Prime film
Meraklı Adamın 10 Günü	Netflix film
Romantik Hırsız	Netflix film
Sen Büyümeye Bak	Netflix film
Tam Bir Centilmen	Netflix film
2023
Film	Note
Aaahh Belinda	Netflix film
Alice Müzikali	Disney musical
Aşk Taktikleri 2	Netflix film
Bihter	Amazon Prime film
Boğa Boğa	Netflix film
Bursa Bülbülü	Disney film
Do Not Disturb: Ayzek ile Bir Gece	Netflix film
Kendi Yolumda	Amazon Prime film
İyi Adamın 10 Günü	Netflix film
Kötü Adamın 10 Günü	Netflix film
Merve Kült	Netflix film
Özür Dilerim	Disney film
Rüyanda Görürsün	Amazon Prime film
2022
Film	Note
Âşıklar Bayramı	Netflix film
Aşk Taktikleri	Netflix film
Aşkın Kıyameti	Netflix film
Cici	Netflix film
Gönül	Netflix film
Kal	Netflix film
Kral Şakir: Geri Dönüşüm	Disney film
Özel Ders	Netflix film
Recep İvedik 7	Disney film
Sen Yaşamaya Bak	Netflix film
Sonsuza Dek Nedime	Netflix film
Ufo	Netflix film
Yılbaşı Gecesi	Disney film
Yolun Açık Olsun	Netflix film
2021
Film	Note
Ata Demirer Gazinosu	BluTV musical stand up
Azizler	Netflix film
Beni Çok Sev	Netflix film
Geçen Yaz	Netflix film
Kağıttan Hayatlar	Netflix film
Kin	Netflix film
Sen Hiç Ateş Böceği Gördün Mü	Netflix film
2020
Film	Note
9 Kere Leyla	Netflix film
Yarına Tek Bilet	Netflix film

== TV Films ==
2024
Film	Note
Ben ve Babam	
2023
Film	Note
Su Koruyucuları: Geleceğin Beşlisi	
2022
Film	Note
Gönül Dağı: Kurban 2	
2021
Film	Note
Gönül Dağı: Kurban	
Tozkoparan İskender: 1071	
Tozkoparan İskender: Zafer	
