= Zeki Ökten =

Turkish film director

- Born: 4 August 1941; Istanbul, Turkey
- Died: 19 December 2009 (aged 68); Istanbul, Turkey
- Occupation: Film director
- Years active: 1963–2006
- Spouse: Güler Ökten (m. 1964)

Zeki Ökten (4 August 1941 – 19 December 2009) was a Turkish film director.

== Biography ==
He was born on 4 August 1941 in Istanbul. Zeki Ökten was interested in theatre during his education at the Haydarpaşa High School. He entered his filmmaking career in 1961 as the assistant director of Nişan Hançer directing Acı Zeytin. Zeki Ökten directed his first film Ölüm Pazarı two years later in 1963. However, he stepped back to the post of assistant director as the success expected did not come. He worked then nine years long as the assistant to the renowned directors like Ömer Lütfi Akad, Halit Refiğ, Memduh Ün and Atıf Yılmaz.

With his films Kadın Yapar in 1972 and with Bir Demet Menekşe in 1973, written by Selim İleri, he gained recognition. He was honored at the Golden Orange Film Festival in 1977 for directing the film Kapıcılar Kralı.

Real success came with the films Sürü (1978) and Düşman (1979), both written by Yılmaz Güney. Düşman won an Honourable Mention at the 30th Berlin International Film Festival in 1980. The film Sürü received nine more international awards, following the honors at the festivals in Locarno 1979 and at Antwerp in 1980. Zeki Ökten received his second Golden Orange award in 1983 for directing the film Faize Hücum. His 1984 film Pehlivan won an Honourable Mention at the 35th Berlin International Film Festival. The themes of his films were social problems featured in comedy.

Zeki Ökten died on 19 December 2009, following heart surgery for which he was admitted the day before to the American Hospital in Istanbul. He was laid to rest at the Zincirlikuyu Cemetery two days later following a religious funeral ceremony held at the Teşvikiye Mosque. Zeki Ökten is succeeded by his wife Güler Ökten, a well-known Turkish actress.

== Filmography ==
- Ölüm Pazari (1963)
- Vurgun (1973)
- Ağri Dağinin Gazabi (1973)
- Bir Demet Menekse (1973) ... a.k.a. A Bunch of Violets (International: English title)
- Hasret (1974) ... a.k.a. Yearning (International: English title)
- Boş Ver Arkadaş (1974)
- Askerin Dönüşü (1974)
- Şaşkın Damat (1975)
- Kaynanalar (1975) ... a.k.a. The Mothers-in-law (International: English title)
- Hanzo (1975)
- Kapıcılar Kralı (1976)
- Sevgili Dayım (1977)
- Çöpçüler Kralı (1977) ... a.k.a. The King of the Street Cleaners (International: English title)
- Düşman (1979) ... a.k.a. The Enemy (International: English title)
- Almanya, Acı Vatan (1979)
- Sürü (1979) ... a.k.a. The Herd (USA)
- Faize Hücum (1982)
- Derman (1983)
- Pehlivan (1984)
- Firar (1984)
- Kurbağalar (1985)
- Ses (1986)
- Kan (1986)
- Davacı (1986)
- Düttürü Dünya (1988)
- "Saygilar Bizden" (1992) TV series
- Aşk Üzerine Söylenmemiş Herşey (1996)
- Güle Güle (2000)
- Gülüm (2003)
- Çinliler Geliyor (2006) ... a.k.a. The Chinese Are Coming (International: English title: literal title)

Awards
Preceded by Atıf Yılmaz	Golden Orange Award for Best Director; 1977 for Kapıcılar Kralı	Succeeded by Atıf Yılmaz
Preceded by Ömer Kavur	Golden Orange Award for Best Director; 1983 for Faize Hücum	Succeeded by Atıf Yılmaz
