= List of Turkish films of 1974 =

A list of films produced in Turkey in 1974 (see 1974 in film):

Name	Director	Starring	Distributed by	Type	Notes
Aç Gözünü Mehmet					
Açlık					
Ah Deme Oh De					
Almanya'da Bir Türk Kızı					
Almanyalı Yarim					
Aman Ne Gırgır					
Anasının Gözü					
Anter					
Arkadaş					
Asılacak Adam					
Askerin Dönüşü					
Atını Seven Kovboy					
Avşar Beyi					
Avanta Yok					
Ayrı Dünyalar					
Ayyaş					
Babayiğit					
Babalık					
Bacım					
Bahriyeli Kemal					
Başa Gelen Çekilir					
Battal Gazinin Oğlu					
Batak					
Bayram Benim Neyime					
Bedrana					
Belalılar					
Belalı Serseri					
Beş Tavuk Bir Horoz					
Bırakın Yaşayalım					
Bir Tanem					
Bir Ana Bir Kız					
Bir Yabancı					
Bir Damla Kan Uğruna					
Boş Ver Arkadaş					
Büyük Sır					
Caferin Nargilesi					
Canavarın Sevgilisi					
Ceza					
Cici Kız					
Çam Sakızı					
Çılgınlar					
Çılgın Arzular					
Çirkin Dünya					
Dadaş Fırat					
Damgalı Adam					
Dayı					
Deli Ferhat					
Dertler Benim Olsun					
Diriliş					
Diyet					
Domatesler Silahlar					
Dört Hergele					
Dövüşe Dövüşe Öldüler					
Düşmanlarım Çatlasın					
El Kapısı					
Emrah					
Enayi					
Endişe					
Erkeksen Kaçma					
Erkekler Ağlamaz					
Erkek Dediğin Böyle Olur					
Eski Kurtlar					
Esir Hayat					
Evet Mi Hayır Mı					
Eziliş					
Fedai					
Gaddar					
Gariban					
Garip Kuş					
Gecelerin Ötesi					
Gel Gardaş Gel					
Gerçek					
Göç					
Gün Akşam Oldu					
Hadi Beni Şaşırt					
Hamama Giren Terler					
Hasret					
Her Gece Bir Bardayım					
Hop Dedik Kazım					
Hostes					
Huma Kuşu					
İmparator					
İntikam					
İstek					
Kader					
Kaderin Mahkumları					
Kahramanlar					
Kalleş					
Kanlı Sevda					
Kanlı Savaş					
Kanlı Deniz					
Kanunun Zinciri					
Karaların Ali					
Kara Seyit					
Kara Murat Kardeş Kanı					
Kara Boğa					
Karanlık Yıllar					
Kardeşim					
Karateciler İstanbul'da					
Kartal Yuvası					
Kısmet					
Kızım Ayşe					
Killing Kolsuz Kahramana Karşı					
Kin					
Komanda Behçet					
Köyden İndim Şehire					
Kiralık Serseri					
Kuma					
Macera Yolu					
Mağlup Edilemeyenler					
Mahçup Delikanlı					
Mekansız Öldüler					
Mavi Boncuk					
Memleketim					
Mirasyediler					
Namus Belası					
Ne Hakem					
Oğul					
Olmaz Böyle Şey					
Otobüs					
Oturak					
Öfkenin Bedeli					
Önce Vatan					
Ölüm Kalım Oyunu (Allah Babamı Affetsin)					
Ölüm Yolcusu					
Ölüm Tarlası					
Öpme Sev					
Parasızlar					
Palavracılar					
Pusu					
Reşo					
Reisin Kızı					
Sabıkalı					
Sahipsizler					
Sahildeki Yabancı					
Salako					
Salak Milyoner					
Sarsılmaz Kuvvet					
Sayılı Kabadayılar					
Saymadım Kaç Yıl Oldu					
Sensiz Yaşanmaz					
Sev Beni Behçet					
Sevmek					
Sezercik Küçük Mücahit					
Sığıntı					
Silahın Elinde Kardeş					
Silemezler Gönlümden					
Sokaklardan Bir Kız					
Sosyete Behçet					
Sütçünün Rüyası					
Şaşkın					
Şehitler					
Şenlik Var					
Şeytan					
Şiribim Şiribom					
Şirvan (film)					
Tak Fişi Fitir İşi					
Tanrım Beni Baştan Yarat					
Tanrı Sevenleri Korur					
Talihsiz Evlat					
Tarzan Korkusuz Adam					
Taşralı Kız					
Tek Başına					
Televizyon Niyazi					
Tipsiz					
Tutku					
Türk Aslanları					
Unutama Beni					
Uyanık Kardeşler					
Uygunsuzlar					
Veda					
Venedikte Aşk Başkadır					
Vur Be Ramazan					
Yalnız Adam					
Yankesici					
Yaşar Ne Yaşar Ne Yaşamaz					
Yatık Emine					
Yatır Sev Kaldır Döv					
Yayla Kızı					
Yaz Bekarı					
Yazık Oldu Yarınlara					
Yılan Yuvası					
Yolsuzlar					
Yüreğimde Yare Var					
Yüz Liraya Evlenilmez					
Zavallı					
Zavallılar					
Zafer Kartalları					
Zindan					

== See also ==
- 1974 in Turkey
