= Orhan Aksoy (director) =

Turkish director and screenwriter

- Born: January 10, 1930; Mustafakemalpaşa, Turkey
- Died: January 21, 2008 (aged 78); Istanbul, Turkey
- Occupation: Director

Orhan Aksoy (January 10, 1930, Bursa – January 21 2008, Istanbul) was a Turkish director and screenwriter. He began his career in film as a projectionist in the now-defunct Saray cinema in Istanbul. He would direct over 90 films, and be a screenwriter for over 50, across his career.

== Filmography ==
- Bir İçim Su (1964)
- Karateci Kız (1973)
- Ah Nerede (1975)
- Happy Days (1978)

== Awards ==
=== Antalya Golden Orange Film Festival ===
- 1970 – Won Best Film Award for Kinali Yapincak
- 1973 – Won Best Film Award for Hayatmi bu
- 1994 – Won Best Film Award for Yumusak ten

== Style ==
Aksoy became famous for his work on melodramas in the late 1960s and early 1970s. When melodramas began to lose their popularity in the 1980s, he became a noted director of musicals and romantic comedies. It was his early work on melodramas which lead him to be regarded as being at the forefront of the 'muhalle' cinema movement in Turkey, where movies often emphasised family life, warm relationships and happy endings.
