= Erden Kıral =

Turkish film director (1942–2022)

- Born: 10 April 1942; Kocaeli, Gölcük, Turkey
- Died: 17 July 2022 (aged 80); Kumluca, Antalya, Turkey
- Occupations: Film director, screenwriter
- Years active: 1978–2022
- Spouse: Tezer Özlü (m. 1968; div. 1981)
- Children: 1

Erden Kıral (10 April 1942 – 17 July 2022) was a Turkish film director and screenwriter. He directed 12 films from 1978 on. His 1979 film, The Canal, was entered into the 11th Moscow International Film Festival, and his 1983 film, A Season in Hakkari, was entered into the 33rd Berlin International Film Festival, where it won the Silver Bear – Special Jury Prize. Five years later, his film, Hunting Time, was entered into the 38th Berlin International Film Festival. He was of Georgian descent through his mother.

== Selected filmography ==
- The Canal (1979)
- On Fertile Lands (Turkish: Bereketli Topraklar Üzerinde; 1980)
- A Season in Hakkari (1983)
- Hunting Time (1988)
- The Blue Exile (1993)
