= List of Turkish films of 1971 =

A list of films produced in Turkey in 1971 (see 1971 in film):

Name	Director	Starring	Film company	Genre	Notes
Acı	Yılmaz Güney	Yılmaz Güney, Fatma Girik			
Adaletin Bu Mu Dünya					
Adını Anmayacağım					
Afacan Küçük Serseri					
Ağıt					
Ah Bir Zengin Olsam					
Ali Baba Kırk Haramiler					
Ali Cengiz Oyunu					
Allı Turnam					
Allah Benimle					
Alaeddinin Lambası					
Altın Prens Devler Ülkesinde					
Altın Mı Aşk Mı					
Anneler Ve Kızları					
Aslanlar Kükreyince					
Asker Ahmet					
Asyanın Tek Atlısı Baybars					
Aşk Uğruna					
Aşk Hikayesi					
Aşk Olsun					
Ateş Parçası					
Ateş Ve Barut					
Ateşli Kadınlar Çetesi					
Avare Kalbim					
Ayıpettin Şemsettin					
Ay Bu Gece Doğacak					
Ayşegül					
Ayşecik Bahar Çiçeği					
Ayşecik ve Sihirli Cüceler Rüyalar Ülkesinde					
Azrail					
Azrail Peşimizde					
Azrailin Beş Atlısı					
Baba					
Batıdan Gelen Adam					
Battal Gazi Destanı					
Batakhaneler Kralı					
Bayan Bacak Tabanca Bıçak					
Bebek Gibi Maşallah					
Beklenen Şarkı					
Belanın Kralı					
Beş Hergele					
Beş İdamlık Adam					
Beyaz Kelebekler					
Beyoğlu Kanunu					
Beyoğlu Güzel					
Bilardo Kazım					
Bin Bela Bir Kurşun					
Binbir Gece Masalları					
Biricik İş Peşinde					
Bir Genç Kız Romanı					
Bir Kadın Kayboldu					
Bir Varmış Bir Yokumş					
Bir Kadın Uğruna					
Bir Avuç Kan					
Bir Teselli Ver					
Bugün Sende Yarın Bende					
Bütün Anneler Melektir					
Büyük Acı					
Cafer Bey İyi Fikir Ve Kibar					
Cambazhane Gülü					
Caniler Uyumaz					
Cehenneme Hoş Geldin					
Cehenneme Bir Yolcu					
Cehenneme Dolmuş Var					
Cemo İle Cemile					
Cımbız Ali					
Cilalı İbo Yetimler Meleği					
Cilalı İbo Teksas Fatihi					
Çamur Şevket					
Çapkın Ve İnsafsız					
Çark					
Çılgın Bakireler					
Çılgın Yenge					
Çıngar Başlıyor					
Çıplaklar					
Çirkin ve Cesur					
Dadaloğlu					
Dört Ateşli Yosma	Savaş Eşici		Nuran Film	Adventure	
Donkişot Sahte Şovalye					
Dişi Tarzan					
Dişi Hedef					
Dudaktan Tabanca					
Elmacı Kadın					
Elvan					
Emine					
En Kralın Tek Kurşun					
Fakir Aşıkların Romanı					
Fakir Kızın Kısmeti					
Fatoş Sokakların Meleği					
Fedailer Mangası					
Feride					
Gecelerin Öfkesi					
Geldi Sevdi Vurdu					
Gelin Çiçeği					
Genç Kızlar Pansiyonu					
Gençliğin Rüyası					
Gizli Aşk					
Gölgen Bile Benden Korkar					
Gönül Hırsızı					
Görünce Kurşunlarım					
Gurur Ve Kin					
Gülüm Dalım Çiçeğim					
Hasret					
Hayat Sevince Güzel					
Hayatım Senindir					
Hayat Cehennemi					
Hedefte İmzam Var					
Hem Döğüş Hem Seviş					
Her Kurşuna Bir Ölü					
Her şey Oğlum İçin					
Her şeyim Sensin					
Hesabı Görelim					
Hey Amigo Sartana					
Hey Amigo Beş Mezar					
Hicran					
Hüdaverdi-Pırtık					
İbret					
İbiş Gangsterlere Karşı					
İdamlık					
İşte Deve İşte Hendek					
İki Belalı Adam					
İkisi de Zımba					
İki Yosma Bir Kurşun					
İki Esir	Natuk Baytan, Esmail Koushan	Cüneyt Arkın, Filiz Akın, Kuzey Vargın, Hülya Babuş, Homayoun, Jamshid Mehrebani	Erler Film, Pars Film	Adventure, Historical, Fantasy, Comedy	Turkish-Iranian co-production film
İntikam Saati					
İntikam Kartalları					
İpi Boynunda Bil					
Jilet Kazım					
Kaatiller					
Katil Kim					
Kaçaklar					
Kader Unuttu Beni					
Kadırgalı Ali					
Kadifeden Kesesi					
Kaf Dağından Göç Edenler					
Kalleşler Af Yok					
Kanım Vatan İçin					
Kanlı Define					
Kanunsuz Yaşayanlar					
Kanunsuz Sokak					
Kaplan Tuzağı					
Kara Cellad					
Kara Memed					
Kara Gün					
Kartallar					
Kavanoz Dipli Dünya					
Kazanova Niyazi					
Keloğlan					
Keloğlan Aramızda					
Keloğlan Ve Yedi Cüceler					
Kerem İle Aslı					
Kezban Pariste					
Kızgın Yabancı					
Kızgın Güneş			Topkapı Film	Erotic adventure	
Kızıl Maskenin İntikamı					
Krallar Kralı Hudaverdi					
Killing Ölüm Saçıyor					
Kin Silah Ve Namus					
Kinova					
Kiralık Katil					
Kirli Eller					
Konuşan Katır At Yarışlarında					
Korkusuz Kaptan Sving					
Kör					
Kötüler Affedilmez					
Kupa Ası Maça Kızı					
Kurşunla Selamlarım					
Kurşun Memed					
Küçük Sevgilim					
Mahşere Kadar					
Makber					
Malkaçoğlu Ölüm Fedaileri					
Maskeli Üçler					
Mavi Boncuk Lassi					
Mavi Eşarp					
Memhmetçik Altın Çocuk					
Melek Mi Şeytan Mı					
Mezarını Kaz Beni Bekle					
Mıstık					
Mualla					
Namus Ve Silah					
Namlunun Ucundasın					
Nasreddin Hoca					
Newyorklu Kız					
Oku Beşikten Mezara Kadar					
On Küçük Şeytan					
Oyun Bitti					
Ölüm Korkusu					
Ölüm Bana Vız Gelir					
Ölümden de Acı					
Ölümden Korkmuyorum					
Ölmeden Tövbe Et					
Ölmeyen Adam					
Ölümünü Kendin Seç					
Öldüren Şehir					
Öldüren Yumruk					
Ölümsüzler					
Ömrümce Unutamadım					
Önce Sev Sonra Öldür					
Profesyoneller					
Rüya Gibi					
Rüzgar Murat					
Saraylar Meleği					
Satın Alınan Koca					
Seks Fırtınası					
Seks Ve Silah					
Senede Bir Gün					
Seni Sevmek Kaderim					
Sevenler Kavuşurmuş					
Severek Ayrılalım					
Sevmek Ve Ölmek Zamanı					
Sevdiğim Uşak					
Sevimli Hırsız					
Sevimli Haydut					
Sezercik Yavrum Benim					
Sıra Sende Yosma					
Sıra Sende Fıstık					
Silahlar Susmasın					
Silahlar Konuşuyor					
Silahlar Affetmez					
Sinderella Kül Kedisi					
Son Hıçkırık			Arzu Film		
Solan Bir Yaprak Gibi					
Suçsuz Firari					
Super Adam					
Sürgünden Geliyorum					
Şafakta Silah Sesleri					
Şahinler Diyarı					
Şehzade Simbad Kaf Dağında					
Şerefimle Yaşarım					
Şeytana Uyduk Bir Kere					
Şimdi Silah Konuşacak					
Talihsiz Gelin					
Tamam Mı Canım					
Tanrı Şahidimdir					
Tarkan: Viking Kanı					
Tehlikeyi Severim					
Tophaneli Murat					
Toto Kralı					
Turist Ömer Boğa Güreşçisi					
Umutsuzlar					
Unutulan Kadın					
Üç Arkadaş					
Üç Kabadayı					
Üç Kızgın Cengaver					
Üç Öfkeli Adam					
Üçünüze Bir Mezar					
Üvey Ana					
Vahşi Çiçek					
Vurguncular					
Yaban Ali					
Yağmur					
Yalnız Değiliz					
Yarın Ağlayacağım					
Yarın Son Gündür					
Yavru İle Kitap					
Yedi Kocalı Hürmüz					
Yosmalar Tuzağı					
Yumurcağın Tatlı Rüyaları					
Yumruk Yumruğa					
Zagor					
Zagor Kara Bela					
Zagor Kara Korsanın Hazineleri					
Zehir Hafiye					
Zapata					
Zarkan Dağların Oğlu					

== See also ==
- 1971 in Turkey
