= Filiz Akın =

Turkish film actress (1943–2025)

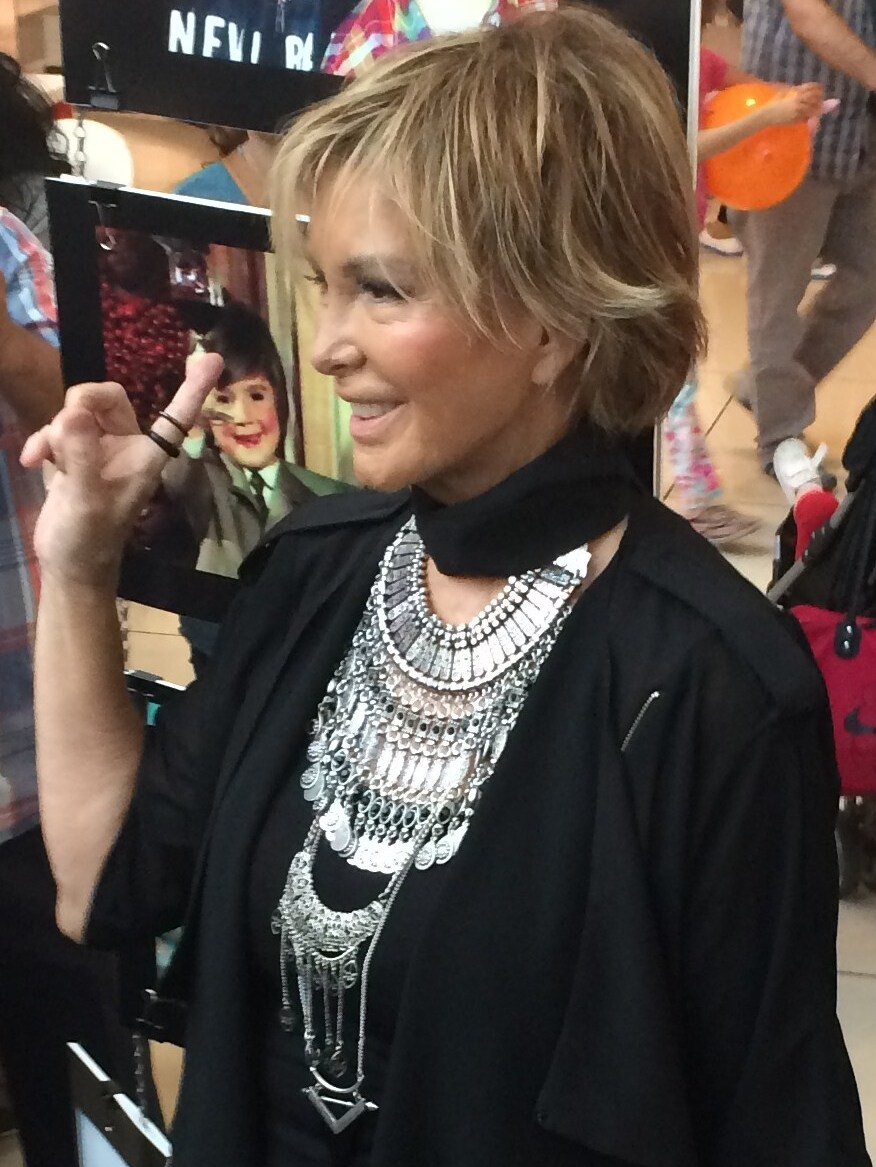
- Akın in 2016
- Born: Suna Akın; 2 January 1943; Ankara, Turkey
- Died: 21 March 2025 (aged 82); Istanbul, Turkey
- Burial place: Aşiyan Asri Cemetery
- Education: Ankara University
- Occupation: Actress
- Years active: 1960–2025
- Spouses: Türker İnanoğlu (m. 1964; div. 1974) Leon Bubi Rubinstein (m. 1982; div. 1993) Sönmez Köksal (m. 1994)
- Children: 1

Filiz Akın (born Suna Akın, 2 January 1943 – 21 March 2025) was a Turkish actress, writer and television presenter. Known as Yeşilçam Turkish cinema's "noble, modern, urban and elegant face", Filiz Akın had a large fan base in Turkey. She was an official ambassador, due to her third husband Sönmez Köksal being Turkey's Ambassador to France.

== Life and career ==
=== Early life and education ===
Filiz Akın was born on 2 January 1943 in Ankara. Her mother, Habibe Leman Şaşırmaz, was a tailor from Ankara, and her father, Bekir Sami Akın, was a judge from Afyonkarahisar. Her mother was of Albanian descent on her paternal side, while her father was of Circassian descent on his maternal side. She had a sister Günseli from her mother's second marriage. Her grandmother, Halime Hanım's father was a clerk of Atatürk, and her stepfather was Atatürk's executive assistant and would ask Halime Hanım's help in Atatürk's attire for state occasions. Filiz Akın lived in Beypazarı, where her father was working, until the age of three. At the age of five, she started attending primary school. She finished her primary education at Sarar Elementary School in Kızılay, Ankara. Her parents divorced when she was seven years old.

Filiz Akın continued her education at TED Ankara College Foundation Schools through boarding and scholarship. She received various awards at the school with her paintings and compositions. She passed all the classes successfully, and was chosen as an ideal student by her teachers. Her best-known hidden talent at school was her very good imitation. In June 1960, she graduated from college. After finishing her studies, she started working at the Ankara branch of American Export-Isbrandtsen Lines. After working at the company for two years, she became the head of its marine branch. She learned English, French, and a little bit of Italian. Meanwhile, she attended Ankara University, Faculty of Language, History and Geography for a semester and studied archaeology.

=== Rise to fame ===
With the insistence of her friend Oya San's mother, Akın participated at a competition organized by Artist magazine and became the winner in 1962. After she was told that she would receive the award only if she would play in the movie Akasyalar Açarken, she refused to accept it. Journalists and filmmakers came from Istanbul to Ankara to convince her, but she still refused to accept the deal. But when Memduh Ün came to Ankara and insisted on it, she accepted to play in the film. She left the university and work and came to Istanbul with her mother. Trusting the executives of the magazine and Memduh Ün, who convinced her to take the role, helped Akın start her film career.

She signed the agreement and after shooting her first film Akasyalar Açarken opposite Göksel Arsoy in 1962, the producers prepared a program for her during the entire year.

=== 1962–1975 ===
Tatlı Dillim, Yumurcak, Umutsuzlar, Ankara Ekspresi, Utanç, Dağlar Kızı Reyhan and Yankesici Kız were among her most famous movies. In 1971, for her role in Ankara Ekspresi she won the best actress award at the 8th International Antalya Film Festival. From May 1962 to September 1972, she starred in more than 105 films. After appearing in 116 films Akın ended her cinema career in 1975. Together with actors Türkan Şoray, Hülya Koçyiğit and Fatma Girik, she left a mark on Turkish cinema and was accepted as one of the four influential actresses of her time.

In 1965, her son İlker from her first marriage to Türker İnanoğlu was born. During this period the family resided at Şişli. In 1974, the couple divorced after 10 years of marriage.

=== 1975–1982 ===
After ending her cinema career, she played in Istanbul Bank's commercials and in 1977 she presented the music program Podyum Show on TRT. In 1979, she took a role in Haldun Dormen'in play Bir Ayrılık.

In 1979, she performed as a headliner at the İzmir International Fair.

In September 1979 she was stabbed in the leg by an attacker while entering the İzmir Efes Hotel. The attacker who was captured immediately, said to the prosecutor that he was in love with Filiz Akın but after she refused his advances, he decided to stab her. He later changed his confession and said that he was asked by mafia boss Mehmet Nabi İnciler to perform this act. Filiz Akın survived the attack with a slight wound and at the same night appeared on stage.

=== 1982–2002 ===
For 11 years, Akın lived in Neuilly and Bougival in Paris, and then moved to the Turkish embassy in Paris for the next four years, making her stay in France 15 years.

In 1982, she married Bubi Rubinstein. They divorced in 1993 after 11 years of marriage.

In 1989, she played in series "Geçmiş Bahar Mimozaları".

In May 1994, she married chief of the National Intelligence Organization Sönmez Köksal in Ankara. After marriage, the couple settled in Ankara. The witnesses to their marriage were President Süleyman Demirel and Speaker of the Grand National Assembly of Turkey Hüsamettin Cindoruk.

Her husband, Sönmez Köksal, was appointed as ambassador to France in February 1998 and for four years they lived at the Turkish embassy in Paris. To promote Turkey and its culture in Paris, she organized a Turkish-Ottoman products exhibition in La Fayette, and Lale Park and Turkish Painters Exhibition in Bagatelle. These actions made Filiz Akın a cultural ambassador, who with her efforts influenced the French by Turkish culture.

In 1991, her father, Sami Akın, died in İzmir.

=== 2002–2025 ===
In 2002, she learned that she had cancer of the nose and mouth (nasopharynx). She received treatment at the MD Anderson Cancer Center of the University of Texas and her cancer was cured.

From 2004 to 2007, she worked as a columnist for Sabah.

In 2005, for the benefit of Turkey Breast Foundation and to support the "yellow bracelets against cancer," she launched a campaign, and more than 1 million bracelets were sold. In 2005, she supported the promotion of the "blue bracelet" campaign organized for the benefit of the Hacettepe University Hope House project, organized to raise awareness of cancer in the community. From 2007, she was a supporter of "Türkiye'de İşitmeyen Kalmasın", a project initiated by The Starkey Hearing Foundation's and Turkey EMÖV Foundation.

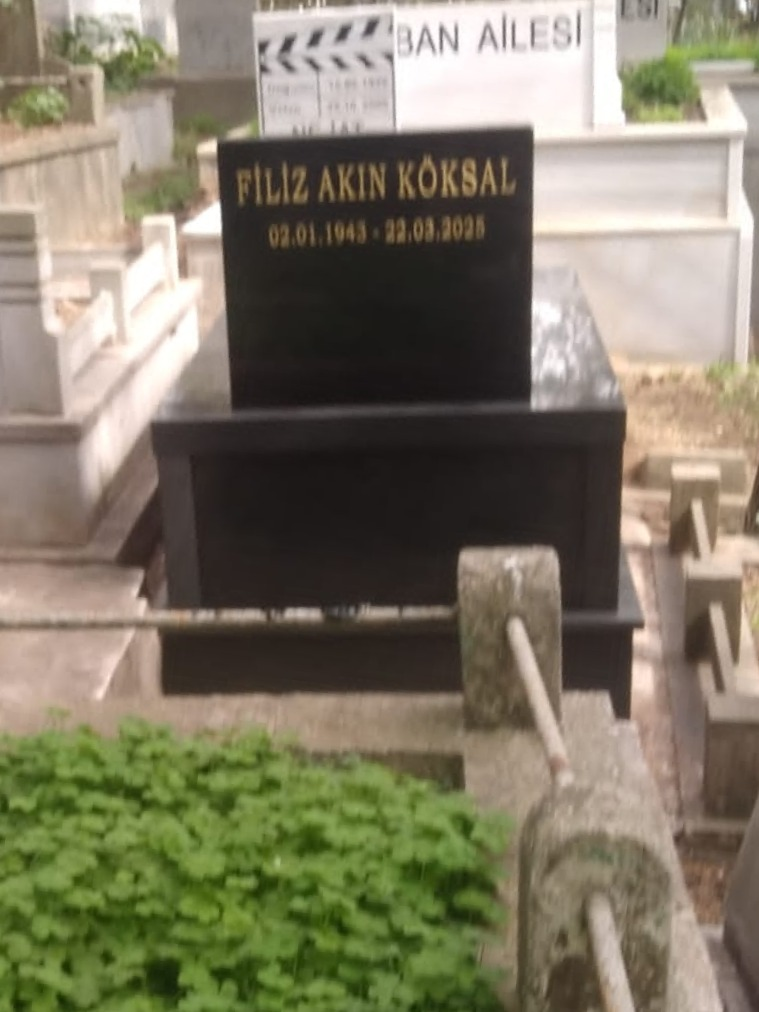
The grave of Filiz Akın at Aşiyan Asri Cemetery in Istanbul.

In 2006, the street where she lived until she was 3 years old, was named as "Filiz Akın Sokak" by the city council in Beypazarı. In 2008, she presented the program "Filiz Akın'la Sohbetler" on Kanal 1. In 2009, she presented "Filiz Akın'la Hafta Sonu Sohbetleri" on Habertürk TV.

In November 2013, she met her fans for her third book, Lezzete Merhaba's signature day at the 32nd Tüyap Istanbul Book Fair. Filiz Akın was a member of the Board of Trustees of TED University.

Akın died at a hospital in Istanbul on 21 March 2025, at the age of 82. She was interred at Aşiyan Asri Cemetery.

== Awards ==
- 1971 International Antalya Film Festival, Best Actress, Ankara Ekspresi
- 1972 School of Journalists, Best Female Artist in Cinema
- 1974 Turkish Journalists' Association, Female Artist of the Year
- 2000 37th International Antalya Film Festival, Lifetime Honorary Award
- 2001 Golden Orange Culture and Art Foundation, Lifetime Honorary Award
- 2004 Contemporary Cinema Actors Association, Acting Award of 2004
- 2005 74th İzmir International Fair, "Sinema Burada Festival"'s Lifetime Honorary Award,
- 2005 Magazine Journalists Association, 12th Golden Objective Awards, Honorary Award
- 2006 Isparta Süleyman Demirel University, honorary doctor degree
- 2008 45th Antalya Golden Orange Film Festival,"Festival Order"
- 2009 16th International Adana Film Festival, Lifetime Honorary Award
- 2010 Yeşilçam Awards, Culture and Art Service Award
- 2010 21st Ankara International Film Festival, Aziz Nesin Labor Award
- 2010 Beykent University, Turkish Cinema Day of Love, Honorary Award
- 2011 6th International Dadaş Film Festival, Honorary Award
- 2012 Magazine Journalists Association, 18th Golden Objective Awards, Honorary Award
- 2012 Datça Golden Almond Cinema and Culture Festival, Honorary Award
- 2013 4th Malatya International Film Festival, Honorary Award
- 2014 Turkish Thai Friendship Award
- 2014 Magazine Journalists' Association, 20th Golden Objective Awards, Lifetime Profession Honorary Award
- 2015 Red Tulip Film Festival, Lifetime Achievement Award
- 2015 15th Frankfurt Turkish Film Festival, Honorary Award
- 2015 1st Çanakkale Short Film Festival, Honorary Award

== Books ==
- "Güzelliklere Merhaba", Altın Kitaplar Yayınevi, 1992
- Akın, Filiz (2005). Hayata merhaba (in Turkish). Epsilon. ISBN 978-975-331-694-1.
- "Filiz Akın ile Güzellik, Zayıflama ve Genç Kalma Üzerine" (2006)
- "Lezzete Merhaba" (2013)

=== Books about her ===
- Silan, Bircan Usallı (2004). Dört yapraklı yonca: onların sihri neydi? (in Turkish). Epsilon. ISBN 978-975-331-640-8.
- Çekirge, Pınar (2007). Başrolde Filiz Akın: Türk sineması'nda ikonografik ve toplumbilimsel bir değer olarak Filiz Akın (in Turkish). Epsilon. ISBN 978-975-331-975-1.
- Akın's portraits have appeared in Atıf Yılmaz 's "Hayallerim, Aşkım ve Sinema" (1990), Türker İnanoğlu's "Bay Sinema" (2004), and Agâh Özgüç's "Türk Sineması’nın Kadınları" (2008).

== Filmography ==
Year	Film	Role	Notes	Ref
1962	Akasyalar Açarken	Filiz	Debut role	
1962	Şehvet Uçurumu	Filiz		
1962	Battı Balık			
1962	Sahte Nikah			
1962	Aşk Merdiveni			
1963	Bekarlık Sultanlıktır	Nurşen		
1963	Beyoğlu Piliçleri	Oya		
1963	Kızlar Büyüdü			
1963	Ölüm Bizi Ayıramaz			
1963	Beyaz Güvercin			
1963	Ölüme Çeyrek Var			
1963	Bana Annemi Anlat			
1963	İki Gemi Yanyana			
1963	Zoraki Milyoner			
1963	Arka Sokaklar	Elif		
1963	Genç Kızların Sevgilisi			
1964	Yankesici Kız	Mehtap / Hacer	Dual role	
1964	Gurbet Kuşları	Ayla		
1964	Şoför Nebahat ve Kızı	Hülya		
1964	Kadın Berberi	Lale		
1964	Meyhaneci	Can Düşmanı Sema		
1964	Uçurumdaki Kadın			
1964	Kardeş Kanı			
1964	On Güzel Bacak	Matmazel Nadya		
1964	İstanbul Sokaklarında			
1964	Cüppeli Gelin			
1964	Filinta Kadri			
1964	Prangasız Mahkumlar			
1964	Paylaşılmayan Sevgili			
1964	Korkunç Şüphe			
1964	Asfalt Rıza			
1964	Tığ Gibi Delikanlı			
1965	Yankesicinin Aşkı (Yankesici Kızın Aşkı)	Hacer		
1965	Tamirci Parçası	Oya		
1965	Babasına Bak Oğlunu Al	Filiz		
1965	Fakir Gencin Romanı	Filiz		
1965	Ölüme Kadar			
1965	Mirasyedi	Filiz		
1965	Oğlum Oğlum	Asuman		
1965	Sevinç Gözyaşları			
1965	Şakayla Karışık			
1966	Çıtkırıldım	Filiz		
1966	Affedilmeyen Esin	Nevin Seden		
1966	Kolejli Kızın Aşkı	Filiz		
1966	Vur Emri	Gül		
1966	Kaderin Cilvesi	Papatya		
1966	Efkarlıyım Abiler	Fatoş / Meral		
1966	Bar Kızı	Deniz		
1966	Erkek Severse			
1966	Affet Sevgilim			
1966	Acı Tesadüf			
1966	Günahkar Kadın			
1967	Silahlı Paşazade	Nilüfer		
1967	Ayrılık Saati	Deniz		
1967	Sözde Kızlar	Mebrure		
1967	Bekar Odası	İffet		
1967	Affet Beni			
1967	Paşa Kızı	Nilgün		
1967	Hindistan Cevizi			
1967	Cici Gelin			
1967	Yıkılan Yuva			
1967	Serseriler Kralı			
1967	Sefiller			
1968	Arkadaşımın Aşkısın	Kan Kardeşim Selma		
1968	Kader	Elif		
1968	Hırsız Kız	Mehtap / Yıldız	Dual role; Bilingual film	
1968	Sabah Yıldızı	Nevin		
1968	Efkarlı Sosyetede	Selma		
1968	Aşka Tövbe	Şehbal		
1968	Yuvana Dön Baba			
1968	Gül ve Şeker	Filiz		
1968	Ömrümün Tek Gecesi			
1968	Benim de Kalbim Var	Selma		
1968	İstanbul Tatili	Nilgün		
1968	Aşkım Günahımdır	Selma Sav		
1969	Son Mektup	Selma		
1969	Cilveli Kız	Kiraz		
1969	Karlı Dağdaki Ateş	Binnur		
1969	Lekeli Melek			
1969	Yaralı Kalp			
1969	Hüzünlü Aşk	Sevgi		
1969	Dağlar Kızı Reyhan	Reyhan		
1969	Yumurcak	Selma		
1970	Yuvasız Kuşlar	Nermin		
1970	Yumurcak Köprüaltı Çocuğu	Selma		
1970	Fadime	Fadime aka Fadik	Bilingual film	
1970	Ankara Ekspresi	Hilda		
1970	Yarım Kalan Saadet	Fatoş		
1970	İşportacı Kız	Gül / Jale	Dual role; Bilingual film	
1970	Aşktan da Üstün	Selma		
1970	Güzel Şoför	Fatma	Bilingual film	
1970	Beyaz Güller			
1971	Küçük Sevgilim	Lale		
1971	Umutsuzlar	Çiğdem		
1971	Emine			
1971	Ömrümce Unutamadım			
1971	Oyun Bitti	Zeynep		
1971	Fadime Cambazhane Gülü	Fadime		
1971	Seni Sevmek Kaderim	Lale		
1971	Yumurcağın Tatlı Rüyaları	Selma		
1971	İki Esir	Zeynep	Bilingual film	
1971	Saadet Şehri / Mah-pishooni		Bilingual film	
1972	Utanç	Bahar		
1972	Ayrılık			
1972	Yumurcak Küçük Şahit		Bilingual film	
1972	Tatlı Dillim	Emine		
1973	Kareteci Kiz	Zeynep		
1973	Soyguncular	Selma / Belma	Dual role	
1973	Acı Hayat			
1973	Zambaklar Açarken	Perran		
1973	Ağlıyorum		Dual role	
1974	Yumurcak / Veda	Selma		
1974	Almanyalı Yarim	Maria aka Meral		
1974	Memleketim	Leyla		
1975	Tatlı Cadının Maceraları	Selma		
1975	Babaların Babası	Nermin		
1975	Yumurcak Belalı Tatil	Zeynep	Bilingual film	
1989	Geçmiş Bahar Mimozaları	Hümeyra	TV series	
2011	Gün Akşam Oldu		TV series	

Awards
Preceded by Belgin Doruk	Golden Orange Award for Best Actress; 1971 for Ankara Ekspresi	Succeeded by Zeynep Aksu
