= Aytaç Arman =

Turkish actor (1949–2019)

- Born: Veysel İnce; 22 June 1949; Adana, Turkey
- Died: 26 February 2019 (aged 69); Istanbul, Turkey
- Occupation: Actor
- Years active: 1971–2014

Aytaç Arman (born Veysel İnce; 22 June 1949 – 26 February 2019) was a Turkish actor. He appeared in more than 40 films and television shows between 1971 and 2019. He starred in the 1979 film The Enemy, which won an Honourable Mention at the 30th Berlin International Film Festival.

== Selected filmography ==
- The Enemy (1979)
- Fatmagül'ün suçu ne? (1986)
- Gece Yolculuğu (1987)
- Hunting Time (1988)
- The Trace (1994)
- Akrebin Yolculuğu (1997)
- Whatever You Wish (2005)
- After the Revolution (2011)
