= List of Turkish films of the 1960s =

This is an incomplete list of films produced in Turkey in the 1960s. An average of 180 films were produced annually.

== 1960s ==
Title	Director	Cast	Studio	Genre	Notes
1960
The Broken Pots	Memduh Ün				Entered into the 11th Berlin International Film Festival
Namus Uğruna	Osman F. Seden	Eşref Kolçak		Drama	
Şoför Nebahat	Metin Erksan				
Gecelerin ötesi	Metin Erksan			Crime, drama	
Satın Alınan Adam					
1961
Oy farfara farfara	Metin Erksan			Adventure, comedy	
Mahalle arkadaşları	Metin Erksan			Adventure, romance	
Güzeller Resmigeçidi	Osman F. Seden			Romance, comedy	
Aşk Hırsızı	Osman F. Seden			Romance	
Aşktan da üstün	Osman F. Seden			Drama, romance	
İki Aşk Arasında	Osman F. Seden			Drama, romance	
Mahalleye gelen gelin	Osman F. Seden			Romance	
1962
Acı hayat	Metin Erksan				
Yılanların öcü	Metin Erksan				
Sahte nikah	Metin Erksan	Filiz Akın			
Çifte kumrular	Metin Erksan			Adventure	
Sokak kızı	Osman F. Seden			Romance	
Ne şeker şey	Osman F. Seden			Comedy, romance	
Külhan aşkı	Osman F. Seden			Romance	
Cilalı İbo Rüyalar Aleminde	Osman F. Seden			Comedy	
Ayşecik- Yavru Melek	Osman F. Seden			Drama	
Stranger in the City	Halit Refiğ		Be-Ya Film	Drama, politics	Entered into the 3rd Moscow International Film Festival
1963
Yaralı Aslan	Osman F. Seden	Ayhan Işık, Fatma Girik	Kemal Film	Comedy, adventure	
Beni Osman öldürdü	Osman F. Seden	Türkan Şoray, İzzet Günay	Kemal Film	Comedy, romance	
Bana annemi anlat	Osman F. Seden	Fikret Hakan, Filiz Akın		Drama	
Badem Şekeri	Osman F. Seden	Fikret Hakan, Türkan Şoray, Fatma Girik, Efgan Efekan, Öztürk Serengil	Kemal Film	Comedy, romance	
L'Immortelle	Alain Robbe-Grillet				Entered into the 13th Berlin International Film Festival
1964
İstanbul Kaldırımları	Metin Erksan	Zeki Müren, Belgin Doruk		Romance	
Dry Summer	Metin Erksan	Hülya Koçyiğit		Drama	Won the Golden Bear at Berlin; released on Blu-ray by Criterion
Suçlular aramızda	Metin Erksan			Crime, drama	
Koçum benim	Osman F. Seden	Ayhan Işık, Fatma Girik	Kemal Film	Comedy, romance	
Beş şeker kız	Osman F. Seden	Ediz Hun, Fatma Girik, Sadri Alışık		Musical, comedy	
Anadolu Çocuğu	Osman F. Seden	İzzet Günay, Neriman Köksal		Romance	
Hızır Dede	Osman F. Seden	Ayhan Işık, Ajda Pekkan, Sadri Alışık		Romance	
Kral Arkadaşım	Osman F. Seden	Ayhan Işık, Tijen Par		Romance	
Affetmeyen Kadın	Osman F. Seden	AHülya Koçyiğit, Ediz Hun, Fikret Hakan		Drama	
Sevinç Gözyaşları	Osman F. Seden	Ayhan Işık, Filiz Akın, Ajda Pekkan		Romance	
Love and Grudge	Turgut Demirağ	Belgin Doruk, Turgut Özatay, Leyla Sayar, Cüneyt Arkın	And Film	Drama	Entered into the 4th Moscow International Film Festival
Birds of Exile	Halit Refiğ		Artist Film	Drama, politics	
1965
Sevmek zamanı	Metin Erksan			Romance, fantasy, drama	
Severek Ölenler	Osman F. Seden	İzzet Günay, Fatma Girik		Drama, war	
Sana layık değilim	Osman F. Seden	Sadri Alışık, Türkan Şoray		Romance	
Elveda sevgilim	Osman F. Seden	Ediz Hun, Türkan Şoray, İzzet Günay		Drama, romance	
Şakayla karışık	Osman F. Seden	Sadri Alışık, Filiz Akın		Comedy	
Seven kadın unutmaz	Osman F. Seden	Ediz Hun, Türkan Şoray		Romance	
The Bread Seller Woman					
1966
Law of the Border	Lütfi Ö. Akad	Yılmaz Güney, Pervin Par, Erol Taş		Drama	Released on Blu-ray by Criterion
Ölmeyen aşk	Metin Erksan				
Meleklerin İntikamı	Osman F. Seden	Türkan Şoray		Romance, drama	
Kıskanç Kadın	Nuri Ergün	Cüneyt Arkın, Hülya Koçyiğit		Romance, drama	
Kenarın Dilberi	Osman F. Seden	Türkan Şoray		Romance	
Düğün Gecesi	Osman F. Seden	Türkan Şoray, Zeki Müren, Ajda Pekkan		Romance	
Çalıkuşu	Osman F. Seden	Türkan Şoray, Kartal Tibet		Romance	Based on a novel
Akşam Güneşi	Osman F. Seden	Türkan Şoray, İzzet Günay		Drama, romance	
Affet Sevgilim	Osman F. Seden	Ediz Hun, Filiz Akın, Ajda Pekkan, Hulusi Kentmen		Drama, romance	
O kadın	Zafer Davutoğlu	Hülya Koçyiğit, Müşfik Kenter		Drama	
Babam katil değildi	Zafer Davutoğlu	Fikret Hakan, Tijen Par		Drama	
Zehirli Çiçek	Mehmet Dinler			Drama	
Can Yoldaşları	Halit Refiğ				
1967
Ayrılsak da beraberiz	Metin Erksan				
Merhamet	Osman F. Seden	Zeynep Değirmencioğlu		Drama	
Hindistan Cevizi	Osman F. Seden	Zeki Müren, Filiz Akın, Sadri Akışık		Comedy, romance	
Ağlayan Kadın	Osman F. Seden	Türkan Şoray, İzzet Günay		Comedy, romance	
Dokuzuncu Hariciye Koğuşu	Nejat Saydam				
Killing in Istanbul	Yılmaz Atadeniz				
1968
Kuyu	Metin Erksan				
İngiliz Kemal'in oğlu	Osman F. Seden	Fikret Hakan		Adventure	
Hicran Gecesi	Osman F. Seden	Hülya Koçyiğit, Ediz Hun, Çolpan İlhan		Drama, romance	
Gül ve Şeker	Osman F. Seden	Ediz Hun, Filiz Akın		Comedy, romance	
Ana hakkı ödenmez	Osman F. Seden	Fatma Girik, Ediz Hun		Drama	
Beş Ateşlı Kadın				Action, comedy	Turkish-Lebanese-Egyptian co-production film
1969
İki günahsız kız: İki hikayeli film	Metin Erksan				
Dağlar kızı Reyhan	Metin Erksan				
Ateşli çingene	Metin Erksan			Romance	
Osmanlı Kartalı	Osman F. Seden	Cüneyt Arkın		Drama, war	
Mısır'dan gelen gelin	Osman F. Seden			Romance	Turkish-Iranian-Lebanese co-production film
Gülnaz Sultan	Osman F. Seden		Kemal Film	History, drama	
Yousaf Va Zulaykha / Yusuf İle Züleyha		Cüneyt Arkın, Forouzan	Erler Film, Pars Film	History, drama	
