= List of Turkish films of 1973 =

A list of films produced in Turkey in 1973:

Name	Director	Starring	Distributed by	Genre	Notes and references
Ablam					
Acı Hayat					
Acı Yumruk					
Affedilmeyenler					
Ağlıyorum					
Ağrı Dağının Gazabı					
Aliye Gönül Verdim					
Anadolu Ekspresi					
Anneler Günü					
Arap Abdo					
Asiye Nasıl Kurtulur					
Aşk Mahkumu					
Aşkın Zaferi					
Aşkımla Oynama					
Atlıhan					
Azap					
Babaların Günahı					
Balıkçı Osman					
Başlık Parası					
Battal Gazi Geliyor					
Bataklık Bülbülü					
Bebek Yüzlü					
Beddua (Günahsız Kadın)					
Bedmen (Yarasa Adam)					
Behçet Derler Adıma					
Beklenmeyen Adam					
Ben Doğarken Ölmüşüm					
Ben Böyle Doğdum					
Beni Mahvettiler					
Beni İntikam Bekliyor					
Bilal-İ Habeşi					
Bir Demet Menekşe					
Bir Dost Bulamadım					
Bitirim Kardeşler					
Bitirimler Sosyetede					
Büyük Soygun					
Büyük Şamata					
Cano					
Canım Kardeşim					
Canilere Ölüm					
Cehennem					
Cengiz Han'ın Fedaisi					
Cennetin Kapısı					
Çakal					
Çaresizler					
Çılgın Gangster					
Çılgın Kız ve Üç Süper Adam					
Çılgınlar					
Çoban					
Çocuğumu İstiyorum					
Çolak					
Dağ Kurdu					
Dağ Kanunu					
Dağdan İnme					
Dağlar Kurbanı					
Debreli Hasan					
Dert Bende					
Dertli					
Derya Gülü					
Destan					
Dikiz Aynası					
Diriliş					
Duvak					
Düğün (The Wedding)	Lütfi O. Akad				First film in a trilogy completed by Gelin (same year) and Diyet (1979)
Düşman					
Elbet Bir Gün Buluşacağız					
Evlat Acısı					
Ezo Gelin					
Fatih'in Fermanı (Kara Murat)					
Felek					
Gazi Kadın (Nene Hatun)					
Gecelerin Hakimi					
Gelin	Lütfi O. Akad				
Gönüller Fatihi Yunus					
Gönülden Yaralılar					
Gurbetçiler					
Gülerken Ağlıyanlar					
Güllü Geliyor Güllü					
Hamsi Nuri					
Harman Sonu					
Haydi Bastır					
Hayat Bayram Olsa					
Hazreti Ömer					
Hazreti Ömer'in Adaleti					
Hazreti Yusuf					
Helal Sana Behçet					
Hudutların Kartalı					
Irgat					
Izdırap					
İhanet					
İki Süngü Arasından					
İki Bin Yılın Sevgilisi					
İntizar					
İnsanlık Ölmedikçe					
Kabadayının Sonu					
Kader					
Kaderimiz					
Kader Çıkmazı					
Kaderim					
Kaderim Kanla Yazıldı					
Çulsuz Ali					
Kaderleri Ölümdü					
Kambur					
Kara Pençe					
Kara Pençenin İntikamı					
Kara Toprak					
Kara Şeytan					
Kara Çalı					
Kara Haydar					
Kara Maske					
Kara Orkun					
Kara Osman					
Kara Sevda					
Karateci Kız					
Katran Bebek					
Kaynanam Kudurdu					
Kır Çiçeği					
Kızım					
Kızın Varmı Derdin Var					
Kızgın Toprak					
Kim Bu Soytarı					
Kolsuz Kahraman					
Kolsuz Kahramanın Kolu					
Korkusuz Adam					
Kuşçu					
Kurt Yemini					
Kurt Kapanı					
Kurt Dölü					
Küçük Kovboy					
Lambaya Püf De (Sütçü)					
Maceraya Bayılırım					
Mağrur Ve Cesur					
Mahpus					
Memiş İle İbiş Gangsterlere Karşı					
Meryem					
Mevlana					
Meyro					
Muhteşem Hırsız					
Namus Borcu					
Namın Yürüsün Behçet					
Nefret					
Nefret (aynı isimde ikinci film)					
Niyet					
O Bir Gangsterdi					
Oğlum Osman					
Oh Olsun					
Öksüzler					
Ölüm Kararı					
Ölüm Saçan Hayalet					
Ölüm Meydanı					
Ölüme Koşanlar					
Ömer Hayyam					
Özleyiş					
Papazlar Şebekesi					
Patron					
Pembe Dünya					
Pir Sultan Abdal					
Rabia (İlk Kadın Evliya)					
Rabia					
Sarı Kız (Kız Evliya)					
Sevilmek İstiyorum					
Sevda Yolcusu					
Siyah Eldivenli Adam					
Siyah Gelinlik					
Soğukkanlılar					
Soygun					
Sultan Gelin					
Susuz Yaz					
Şaban İstanbul'da					
Şeytanın Kurbanları					
Şirvan İle Nazlı					
Şüphe					
Tarkan: Güçlü Kahraman					
Tatlım					
Tek Kollu Bayram					
Teslim Ol Baba					
Topal					
Toprak Ana					
Turist Ömer Uzay Yolunda					
Tuzak					
Uğraş Ölümden Ötesi Yok					
Umut Dünyası					
Üç Dev Adam					
Üç Süper Adam					
Üç Balıkçı Kız					
Vahşet					
Ve Onu Vurdular					
Vurgun					
Vur Emri					
Vurun Kahpeye					
Yaban					
Yaban (Aynı isimde ikinci film)					
Yabancı					
Yalancı (Çok Yalnızım)					
Yalancı Yarim					
Yanaşma					
Yarını Olmayanlar					
Yedi Belalılar					
Yedi Evlat İki Damat					
Yemin					
Yeryüzünde Bir Melek					
Yunus Emre					
Yunus Emre Destanı					
Zalim					
Zalim Kartal					
Zalim Avcı					
Zaloğlu Rüstem					
Zambaklar Açarken					
Züleyha					

== See also ==
- 1973 in Turkey
