= Hülya Koçyiğit =

Turkish actress (born 1947)

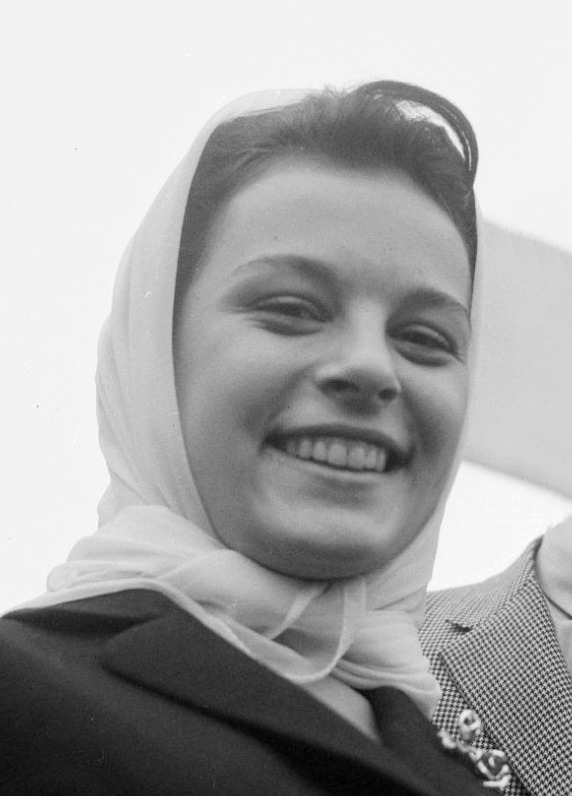
- Hülya Koçyiğit in 1964
- Born: 12 December 1947 (age 78); Kuzguncuk, Istanbul
- Occupation: Film actress
- Years active: 1963–present
- Spouse: Selim Soydan (m. 1968)
- Children: 1
- Awards: Golden Orange Award for Best Actress (1969, 1973, 1975, 1983, 1990); Golden Boll Award for Best Actress (1973); Golden Orange Live Achievement Award (1996)

Hülya Koçyiğit (born 12 December 1947) is a Turkish actress. A prominent female lead in the Turkish cinema, she received numerous awards at international film festivals, including the Antalya Golden Orange Film Festival. Altogether, she has acted in some 180 films.

== Biography ==
Koçyiğit's father is a Turkish immigrant from Bulgaria. She grew up in Istanbul and finished her secondary education in Ankara, where she attended Atatürk High School for Girls, currently Beşiktaş Atatürk Anadolu Lisesi. After she then enrolled in Ankara Academy of State Art's ballet department for education in the arts, she continued ballet department of Istanbul City Conservatory. She joined Istanbul City Theatre during her middle education. After Muhsin Ertuğrul suggested, she studied in theatre department of Ankara State Conservatory.

Koçyiğit decided to venture into cinema in 1963 after she was the runner-up in a beauty contest organized by the magazine Ses (literally: Sound). Her debut film was the 1964 Susuz Yaz (Dry Summer), which went on to win the Golden Bear Award at the 14th Berlin International Film Festival. This honor was the first of its kind ever bestowed upon a Turkish movie. Derman, a film she starred in was the first Turkish film that played in five continents. Kurbağalar, another of her famous films was the first Turkish movie that was sold to international televisions. She received the distinction of "Turkish state artist" in 1991.

Lütfü Akad, Atıf Yılmaz, Şerif Gören, Metin Erksan, Orhan Aksoy, Memduh Ün, Ertem Eğilmez, Osman F. Seden, Halit Refiğ are some of the directors who have worked with Koçyiğit.

Koçyiğit holds the distinction of having won the most national and international awards as a Turkish actress.

In 2009, she starred in Altın Kızlar the Turkish TV adaptation of the famous American series, The Golden Girls. Koçyiğit played the role originated by Bea Arthur.

Her sisters Nilüfer Koçyiğit, Feryal Koçyiğit and her daughter Gülşah Alkoçlar were child actresses. In 1968, she married Selim Soydan, then a Fenerbahçe S.K. footballer. The couple have a daughter named Gülşah Alkoçlar. Her grandchild Neslişah Alkoçlar married actor Engin Altan Düzyatan.

== Filmography ==
=== Series ===
- Macide Öğretmen
- Asla Unutma
- Nisan Yağmuru
- Altın Kızlar

=== Movies ===
Year	Film	Role	Nots
1963	Susuz Yaz	Bahar	
1963	Genç Kızlar	Oya Deren	
1964	Adalardan Bir Yar Gelir		
1964	Affetmeyen Kadın		
1964	Ahtapotun Kolları		
1964	Aslan Marka Nihat		
1964	Ayşecik Çıtı Pıtı Kız		
1964	Bir İçim Su		
1964	Döner ayna		
1964	Hepimiz kardeşiz		
1964	Katilin Kızı	Nazan	
1964	Kavga Var		
1964	Keşanlı		
1964	Plajda Sevişelim		
1964	Son Tren	Pelin	
1964	Taşralı Kız	Hülya Işık	
1964	Vurun Kahpeye	Aliye Öğretmen	
1965	Aşk ve İntikam		
1965	Dudaktan Kalbe		
1965	Hıçkırık		
1965	Hülya		
1965	İki Yavrucak		
1965	Kadın İsterse	Matmazel Nadya	
1965	Lafını Balla Kestim		
1965	Nazar Değmez İnşallah		
1965	Posta Güvercini	Şahiser	
1965	Serseri Aşık		
1965	Sevgili Öğretmenim		
1965	Sevgim ve Gururum	Zerrin Bağdatlı	
1965	Tehlikeli Adımlar		
1965	Uzakta Kal Sevgilim		
1965	Yalancı		
1965	Yıldızların Altında		
1966	Aşk Mücadelesi		
1966	Damgalı Kadın		
1966	Denizciler Geliyor		
1966	Dertli Gönüller		
1966	Dişi Düşman	Asuman	
1966	İntikam Ateşi		
1966	Karanlıklar Meleği	Gül	
1966	Kaderde Birleşenler		
1966	Kıskanç Kadın	Nevin Seden	
1966	Kumarbazın İntikamı	Leyla	
1966	O Kadın	Ayşe	
1966	Ölmek mi yaşamak mı (film)	Hülya	
1966	Seni Seviyorum		
1966	Siyahlı Kadın		
1966	Vahşi Sevda		
1966	Yiğit Yaralı Olur		
1967	Çıldırtan Dudaklar		
1967	Deli Fişek		
1967	Hırçın Kadın		
1967	Dokuzuncu Hariciye Koğuşu	Nüzhet	
1967	Gül Ağacı		
1967	Kardeş Kavgası		
1967	Ringo Gestapoya Karşı		
1967	Parmaklıkların Arkasından		
1967	Samanyolu		
1967	Seni Affedemem		
1967	Söyleyin Genç Kızlara		
1967	Utanç Kapıları		
1967	Yağmur Çiselerken		
1967	Üvey Ana		
1967	Yanık Kalpler		
1967	Yaralı Kuş		
1968	Cemile		
1968	Kadın Asla Unutmaz		
1968	Hicran Gecesi		
1968	Funda		
1968	Dağları Bekleyen Kız		
1968	Kırmızı Fener Sokağı		
1968	Kara Sevda		
1968	Sevemez Kimse Seni		
1968	Kezban		
1968	Sarmaşık Gülleri		
1968	Sus Kimseler Duymasın		
1968	Vahşi bir erkek sevdim (film)	Gül	
1968	Yalan Yıllar		
1968	Yasemin'in Tatlı Aşkı		
1969	Boş Çerçeve	Alev	
1969	Ölmüş Bir Kadının Mektupları		
1969	Kınalı Yapıncak		
1969	Kızıl Vazo	Azize Sönmezoğlu	
1969	Kızım ve Ben	Leyla	
1969	Sen Bir Meleksin		
1969	Uykusuz Geceler		
1969	Yarın Başka Bir Gündür	Gül Fatma Kunt	
1970	Güller ve Dikenler		
1970	Kezban Roma'da		
1970	Kalbimin Efendisi		
1970	Saadet Güneşi	Semra	
1970	Seven Ne Yapmaz	Sevda	
1970	Söz Müdafaanın	Selma Alkan	
1970	Sürtük	Canan Alev, Naciye	
1970	Yaralı Ceylan		
1970	Zeyno		
1971	Adını Anmayacağım		
1971	Bebek Gibi Maşallah	Leyla Erdem Yılmaz	
1971	Beklenen Şarkı		
1971	Beyoğlu Güzeli	Alev Aker	
1971	Bütün Anneler Melektir	Selma	
1971	Kezban Paris'te	Kezban	
1971	Hayatım Senindir	Leyla Sonay, Nermin	
1971	Senede Bir Gün		
1971	Severek Ayrılalım		
1971	Sezercik Yavrum Benim		
1971	Son Hıçkırık		
1971	Üç Arkadaş		
1971	Yağmur		
1971	Yarın Ağlayacağım		
1972	Azat Kuşu		
1972	Gökçe Çiçek		
1972	Kaderimin Oyunu		
1972	Sev Kardeşim		
1972	Sezercik Aslan Parçası		
1972	Tanrı Misafiri		
1972	Zehra		
1973	Düğün		
1973	Hayat Bayram Olsa		
1973	The Bride		
1973	İki Bin Yılın Sevgisi		
1973	Rabia		
1973	Siyah Gelinlik		
1973	Yeryüzünde Bir Melek		
1974	Çirkin Dünya		
1974	Diriliş		
1974	Diyet		
1974	El Kapısı		
1975	Bir Araya Gelemeyiz		
1975	Gülşah		
1975	Çirkef		
1975	İşte Hayat		
1976	Gülşah Küçük Anne		
1976	Şoför		
1977	Sensiz Yaşayamam		
1977	İstasyon		
1978	Evlidir Ne Yapsa Yeridir		
1979	Almanya Acı Vatan	Güldane	
1981	Herhangi Bir Kadın		
1982	Gazap Rüzgarı	Avukat Selma	
1983	Derman		
1984	Firar	Ayşe Sarıca	
1985	Kurbağalar		
1986	Dikenli Yol		
1987	Bez Bebek		
1988	Gece Dansı Tutsakları		
1988	Pononte Fener		
1989	Hiçbir Gece		
1989	Karılar Koğuşu		
1991	Bir Kadın		
2001	Şellale	Semra	
2003	Hababam Sınıfı Merhaba	Fatoş Hoca	
2007	Hicran Sokağı	Zümrüt	

== Awards ==
=== Domestic festival awards ===
- Best Actress of the Year, Turkish Ministry of Tourism (1964)
- Woman of the Year, Turkish Women's Union (1964)
- Golden Orange (Antalya) for Cemile (1969)
- Golden Boll (Adana) for Zehra (1972)
- Golden Orange (Antalya) for Diyet (1975)
- Golden Orange (Antalya) for Derman (1984)
- Golden Orange (Antalya) for Karılar Koğuşu (1990)
- Golden Orange, Lifetime Achievement Award
- Golden Boll, Lifetime Achievement Award
- Çasot, Lifetime Achievement Award
- Istanbul Film Festival, Honorary Award
- Ankara Film Festival, Honorary Award
- Uçan Süpürge Film Festival, Honorary Award
- Siyad, Honorary Award

=== International film awards ===
- Most Successful Actress Award for Kurbağalar, Nantes Film Festival (1987)
- Best Actress Award for Bez Bebek, Amiens Film Festival (1988)

=== Foreign film festival appearances ===
- London Film Festival, for Derman
- Berlin Film Festival, for Susuz Yaz
- Mexico Film Festival, for Susuz Yaz
- Tehran Film Festival, for Gelin
- Tashkent Film Festival, for Almanya Acı Vatan

=== Film festival screenings ===
- Susuz Yaz Berlin Film Festival, Mexico Film Festival
- Gelin Tehran Film Festival
- Derman Karlovy Film Festival, Venice Film Festival, London Film Festival, Nantes Film Festival, Damascus Film Festival (She holds the greatest award), Tashkent Film Festival
- Kurbağalar Nantes Film Festival, Best Actress Award
- Yalan Dunya Antalya Film Festival

Awards
Preceded by Türkan Şoray	Golden Orange Award for Best Actress; 1969 for Cemile	Succeeded by Belgin Doruk
Preceded by Zeynep Aksu	Golden Orange Award for Best Actress; 1973 for Tanrı Misafiri	Succeeded by Perihan Savaş
Preceded by Türkan Şoray	Golden Boll Award for Best Actress; 1973 for Zehra	Succeeded by not held
Preceded by Perihan Savaş	Golden Orange Award for Best Actress; 1975 for Diyet	Succeeded by Adile Naşit
Preceded by Nur Sürer	Golden Orange Award for Best Actress; 1983 for Derman	Succeeded by Hale Soygazi
Preceded by Nur Sürer	Golden Orange Award for Best Actress; 1990 for Karılar Koğuşu	Succeeded by Sumru Yavrucuk
