= Erkek Ve Dişi =

- Directed by: Halit Refiğ
- Starring: Fikret Hakan, Selda Alkor, and Reha Yurdakul
- Release date: 1966
- Country: Turkey
- Language: Turkish

Erkek Ve Dişi is a 1966 Turkish drama film, directed by Halit Refiğ and starring Fikret Hakan, Selda Alkor, and Reha Yurdakul.
