= Scheherazade (disambiguation) =

Scheherazade is a major character and the storyteller in One Thousand and One Nights.

Scheherazade, Shéhérazade, or variants, may also refer to:

== Arts and entertainment ==
=== Film and television ===
- Shéhérazade (1963 film), a French adventure film
- Shéhérazade (2018 film), a French film
- 1001 Nights (1990 film), released in some markets as Sheherazade
- Şehrazat (film), a 1964 Turkish thriller
- Shahrzad (TV series), an Iranian romantic and historical drama series
- "Scheherazade", an episode of Law & Order: Special Victims Unit season 8

=== Music ===
- Shéhérazade (Ravel), two works by Ravel
  - Shéhérazade (Frederica von Stade recording), 1981
- Scheherazade (Rimsky-Korsakov), a symphonic suite later adapted for ballet
- Scheherazade, 1848 classical composition work of Robert Schumann as part of Album for the Young
- Sheherazade, a 1915 piano piece by Karol Szymanowski
- Sheherazade (Ornella Vanoni album), 1995
- Scheherazade, a 2016 album by Freakwater
- Shahrazad, a 2023 album by Delara
- Scheherazade and Other Stories, an album by English progressive rock band Renaissance

=== Other uses in arts and entertainment ===
- Shéhérazade, a 1947 play by Jules Supervielle

== Given name ==
- Shahrazad Ali (born 1954), American author
- Shahrzad (actress) (1950–2025), Iranian actress and poet
- Shahrzad (Reza Kamal) (1898–1937), Iranian dramatist and playwright
- Shaharzad Akbar (born 1987), Afghan human rights activist
- Shahrzad Mirgholikhan (born 1977), Iranian whistleblower
- Shahrzad Mojab, Iranian-Canadian academic
- Shahrzad Rafati (born 1979), Iranian-Canadian media executive
- Shahrzad Seifi (born 1986), Iranian producer and actress
- Shahrzad Sepanlou (born 1975), Iranian-American singer
- Shahrzad Shokouhivand, Iranian pastry chef and entrepreneur
- Sheherazade Goldsmith (born 1974), British environmentalist, jeweler and columnist
- Shéhérazade Semsar-de Boisséson (born 1968), Franco-Iranian executive
- Shérazad Reix (born 1989), French tennis player
- Şehrazat (Şehrazat Kemali Söylemezoğlu, born 1952), Turkish singer-songwriter

== Surname ==
- Rachel Sheherazade (born 1973), Brazilian journalist

== Other uses ==
- Shahrazad (crater), on Saturn's moon Enceladus
- Scheherazade (yacht), launched 2019
- 643 Scheherezade, a minor planet orbiting the Sun
- Scheherazade New and Scheherazade, fonts for Arabic script

== See also ==
- Scheherazade and Other Stories, 1975 album by Renaissance
- Scheherazade, Tell Me a Story, 2009 Egyptian film
- Scheherazade's Diary, 2013 film
- Princesse Shéhérazade, French animated TV series
- The Magic of Scheherazade, 1987 video game
- Song of Scheherazade, 1947 American film starring Yvonne De Carlo and Jean-Pierre Aumont
- A sister to Scheherazade, 1987 novel by Assia Djebar
