= Yaşamak Ne Güzel Şey =

1969 Turkish musical comedy film by Halit Refiğ

- Directed by: Halit Refiğ
- Starring: Öztürk Serengil, Selda Alkor, and Engin Çaglar
- Release date: 1969
- Country: Turkey
- Language: Turkish

Yaşamak Ne Güzel Şey is a 1969 Turkish musical comedy film directed by Halit Refiğ and starring Öztürk Serengil, Selda Alkor, and Engin Çaglar.
