= Ahu Tuğba =

Turkish actress (1955–2024)

- Born: Tuğba Çetin; 13 August 1955; Istanbul, Turkey
- Died: 1 September 2024 (aged 69); Miami, Florida, U.S.
- Occupation: Actress
- Years active: 1973–2006
- Spouses: ? (m. 1973; div. ?); Mustafa Ulusoy (m. 1979; div. 1983) Nafiz Kavi (m. 1981, divorced) Süha Kutlu (m. 1984; div. 1984) Osman Soyer (m. 1988; div. 1988) Enis Karaduman (m. 1989; div. 1990): Mete Has (?); Pascal Levaseur (m. 1991; div. 1992) Timmy Alejtanij (m. 1992; div. 1998): ? (m. 2010)
- Children: 1

Ahu Tuğba (born Tuğba Çetin; 13 August 1955 – 1 September 2024) was a Turkish actress.

== Life and career ==
Tuğba was born into a wealthy family in Istanbul on 13 August 1955. She graduated from Istanbul's American High School for Girls, high school section for girls of Robert College, and attended English language studies at Concordia University in Canada.

She appeared in a brief role in a 1974 film for the first time and she was introduced into the Turkish world of cinema as of the late 1970s. By the early 1980s, she had attained national fame. She also produced a music album in 1987. She has one daughter namely Anjelik Calvin.

Tuğba was involved in a traffic collision in Miami in April 2024, and remained hospitalised for three weeks. She died from Chronic obstructive pulmonary disease on 1 September 2024 at her home in Miami, at the age of 69. According her daughter cause of her death could be due to poisoning.

== Filmography ==
Cinema
Year	Title	Role	Notes
1973	Öksüzler	Davetli	
1974	Anter Kara Ali	Dansöz Kadın	
1974	Şeytan	Suzan	
1975	Ayıkla Beni Hüsnü	Margaret	
1975	Bunalım		
1975	Tolga	Sofia	
1975	Vur Tatlım		
1976	Cıbıl		
1977	Akdeniz Kartalı		
1977	Mavi Mersedes	Ahu	
1978	Şerefsiz Şeref	Ahu Tuğba (kendisi)	
1978	Derviş Bey	Sevda	
1979	Dokunmayın Şabanıma	Oya	
1980	Banker Bilo	Necla	
1980	Şaşkın Milyoner	Selma	
1981	Yapışık Kardeşler	Ahu	
1982	Elveda Dostum	Sibel	
1983	Beyaz Ölüm	Meral	
1983	Kurban	Bahar	
1983	Zifaf	Çağla	
1984	Kadın Bir Defa Sever	Zümrüt	
1984	Kayıp Kızlar	Lale	
1984	Taçsız Kraliçe	Ahu - Naciye	
1984	Yangın	Lale	
1984	Yosma	Pınar	
1986	Akrep	Şadiye	
1986	Hayat Kadını	Sevda	
1986	Gülümse Biraz	Çağla	
1987	Damga	Cemile	
1987	Deli Gönlüm	Gönül	
1988	Evcilik Oyunu	Mehtap - Nevin	
1988	Kumar	Arzu	
1988	Yasak İlişki	Gülbahar	
1989	Acı Yıllar	Selma	
1989	Bir Aşk Bin Günah	Cennet	
1989	Gece		
1989	Suçumuz Kadın Olmak	Mine	
1989	Yağmur Altında Bir Kedi	Duygu	
1990	Akdeniz Güneşi		
1990	Ayrılık		
1990	Aşk Üçgeni	Sibel	
1990	Haciz Kararı	Filiz	
1991	Aldatacağım	Lale	
1993	Ayça Seni Seviyoruz	Ayça	
1993	Aşk ve Aşk	Naz	
1995	Analar Ölmez		
1995	Aşkın Gücü		
2005	Pembe & Mavi	Ahu	
2006	Meçhule Gidenler	Seta	
