= Güneşe Giden Yol =

- Directed by: Halit Refiğ
- Starring: Ayhan Isik, Selda Alkor, Muzaffer Tema
- Release date: 1965
- Country: Turkey
- Language: Turkish

Güneşe Giden Yol is a 1965 Turkish drama film, directed by Halit Refiğ and starring Ayhan Isik, Selda Alkor, Muzaffer Tema.
