= İrem Altuğ =

Turkish actress

- Born: 15 September 1980 (age 45); Istanbul, Turkey
- Occupation: Actress
- Years active: 1989–present

İrem Altuğ (born 15 September 1980) is a Turkish actress.

== Life and career ==
She started her career in the show business at the age of 7 when she was nominated as the best commercial face in a national talent contest. She has done over 40 commercials and acted in various theater projects as a child actor through the years. Her first profession debut on silver screen was at 1989 by the film Karilar Kogusu in direction of Halit Refig.

To develop her inspirations in acting, she started studying drama at Mimar Sinan University of Conservatory. In 2000, she moved to US and continued her education in the Theater Art Department of San Francisco State University. During her study in California, she has taken different roles in independent films.

In Turkey she has starred in two crime investigation TV series called Seytan Ayrintida Gizlidi and Kayip Araniyor and two drama TV shows known as Ihlamurlar Altinda and Vazgec Gonlum.

She made her second appearance on silver screen in 2006 by the period film of Semir Aslanyurek’s Eve Giden Yol 1914. Later on she starred in the comedy film Kirpi. She performed in the German-Turkish co-production TV film Murder in Bosphorus directed by Michael Kreindl.

In 2009 she starred in the drama Melekler ve Kumarbazlar and her latest feature film is Nar written and directed by Umit Unal which will be released in 2011.

Aside from acting, Irem Altug has been writing short stories and scripts. She wrote a short film script called Love is Blind and co-produced it with the director Ertuğ Tüfekçioğlu. The short film was selected to Cannes Film Festival's Short Film Corner and was awarded “the best short film” in world cinema category at Indianapolis Film Festival.

== Filmography ==
=== Film ===
- Karılar Koğuşu 1989
- Eve Giden Yol-1914 (İffet) 2006
- Melekler ve Kumarbazlar (Zeynep) 2009
- Kirpi (Çiğdem) 2009

=== TV ===
- Şeytan Ayrıntıda Gizlidir (Zeynep) 2004
- Ihlamurlar Altında (Feride) 2005
- Vazgeç Gönlüm (Bahar) 2007
- Kayıp Aranıyor (Asya) 2011
- Aşk Ekmek Hayaller (Reyhan) 2013
- Çember 2017
- Çukur (Ayşe Koçovalı) 2017–2021
- Kalp Yarası (Feraye) - 2022
- Yalı Çapkını (Sultan) - 2022-2023
- Bir Gece Masali (Sevde Yilmaz) - 2024-2025
