= Şafak Bekçileri =

- Directed by: Halit Refiğ
- Starring: Göksel Arsoy, Leyla Sayar, and Nilüfer Aydan
- Release date: 1963
- Country: Turkey
- Language: Turkish

Şafak Bekçileri is a 1963 Turkish drama film, directed by Halit Refiğ and starring Göksel Arsoy, Leyla Sayar, and Nilüfer Aydan.
