= Ali Şen =

Turkish actor (1918–1989)

Ali Şen (26 December 1918 – 15 December 1989) was a Turkish actor, father of the actor Şener Şen. He was born in Adana, Ottoman Empire and died in Istanbul, Turkey.

== Filmografisi ==
- 1934: Aysel Bataklı Damın Kızı
- 1935: Aysel Bataklı Damın Kızı
- 1937: Güneşe Doğru
- 1938: Aynaroz Kadısı
- 1939: Taş Parçası
- 1940: Yılmaz Ali
- 1940: Şehvet Kurbanı
- 1941: Kıvırcık Paşa
- 1942: Sürtük
- 1943: Onüç Kahraman
- 1944: Hasret
- 1945: Onüç Kahraman
- 1946: Senede Bir Gün
- 1947: Gençlik Günahı
- 1948: Damga
- 1949: Üvey Baba
- 1950: Lüküs Hayat
- 1951: Istanbul'un Fethi
- 1952: Drakula istanbul'da
- 1952: Yavuz Sultan Selim Ağlıyor
- 1953: Halıcı Kız
- 1954: Ahretten Gelen Adam
- 1955: Battal Gazi Geliyor
- 1956: Büyük Sır
- 1957: Bir Avuç Toprak
- 1958: Altın Kafes
- 1958: Iftıra
- 1958: Gökler Kraliçesi
- 1958: Dokuz Dağın Efesi Çakıcı Geliyor
- 1959: Kalpaklılar
- 1959: Kırık Plak
- 1959: Düşman Yolları Kesti
- 1960: Dolandırıcılar Şahı
- 1960: Yeşil Kurbağalar
- 1961: Altın Hırsı
- 1961: Oy Farfara Farfara
- 1961: Yedi Günlük Aşk
- 1961: Yılanların Öcü
- 1962: Battı Balık
- 1962: Geçti Buranın Pazarı
- 1962: Gençlik Hülyaları
- 1962: Hodri Meydan
- 1962: Kırmızı Karanfiller
- 1962: Kısmetin En Güzeli
- 1962: Ne Şeker Şey
- 1962: Neşemizi Bulalım
- 1962: Şehirdeki Yabancı
- 1962: Şehvet Uçurumu
- 1962: Şeyh Ahmed'in Torunu
- 1962: Silah Arkadaşları
- 1962: Sokak Kızı
- 1962: Ver Elini İstanbul
- 1962: Fatoş'un Bebekleri
- 1963: Bahçevan
- 1963: Beyaz Güvercin
- 1963: Bir Hizmetçi Kızın Hatıra Defteri
- 1963: Cici Can
- 1963: İkisi de Cesurdu
- 1963: Kendini Arayan Adam
- 1963: Üç Çapkın Gelin
- 1963: Üç Öfkeli Genç
- 1964: Ana Bizi Eversene
- 1964: Asfalt Rıza
- 1964: Ayvaz Kasap
- 1964: Dağların Aslanı
- 1964: Günah Kadınları
- 1964: Kara Şahin
- 1964: Kocaoğlan
- 1964: Mor Defter
- 1964: Plajda Sevişelim
- 1964: Şahane Züğürtler
- 1964: Şoförler Kralı
- 1964: Şu Kızların Elinden
- 1964: Vurun Kahpeye
- 1965: Aman Dünya Ne Dar İmiş
- 1965: Beleş Osman
- 1965: Beni Kadınlara Sor
- 1965: Buzlar Çözülmeden
- 1965: Fakir Gencin Romanı
- 1965: Hülya
- 1965: Hıçkırık
- 1965: Kalbimdeki Serseri
- 1965: Kanunsuzlar
- 1965: Kardeş Belası
- 1965: Kasımpaşalı Recep
- 1965: Kasımpaşalı Yunus Bey
- 1965: Konyakçı
- 1965: Mirasyedi
- 1965: Murat'ın Türküsü
- 1965: Onyedinci Yolcu
- 1965: Karaoğlan Altay'dan Gelen Yiğit
- 1965: Seveceksen Yiğit Sev
- 1965: Şoför Nebahat Bizde Kabahat
- 1965: Tavan Arası
- 1965: Vahşi Gelin
- 1965: Veda Busesi
- 1966: Senede Bir Gün
- 1966: Karaoğlan Baybora'nın Oğlu
- 1966: Düğün Gecesi
- 1966: Eşrefpaşalı
- 1966: Göklerdeki Sevgili
- 1966: Her Şafakta Ölürüm
- 1966: İbrahim Ethem İlahi Davet
- 1966: Kaderde Birleşenler
- 1966: Kanun Benim
- 1966: Kovboy Ali
- 1966: Meyhanenin Gülü
- 1966: Topal Osman
- 1966: Zalimler
- 1966: Zaloğlu Rüstem
- 1966: Karaoğlan Camoka'nın Intikami
- 1967: Anadolu Kızı
- 1967: At Hırsızı Banuş
- 1967: Bir Dağ Masalı
- 1967: Bizansı Titreten Adam
- 1967: Demir Kapı
- 1967: Hacı Bektaş Veli
- 1967: Kara Atmaca
- 1967: Kara Kartal (I)
- 1967: Karım Beni Aldatırsa
- 1967: Kırbaç Altında
- 1967: Kocadağlı
- 1967: Namus Belası
- 1967: Sinekli Bakkal
- 1967: Şoför Parçası
- 1967: Tapılacak Kadın
- 1967: Utanç Kapıları
- 1967: Yolsuz Mehmet
- 1967: Karaoğlan Bizanslı Zorba
- 1968: Affedilmeyen Suç
- 1968: Ayşem
- 1968: Çöl Kartalı / Şeyh Ahmed
- 1968: Dertli Pınar
- 1968: Eşkiya Halil (Haydut)
- 1968: Habis Ruhlar
- 1968: Kalbimdeki Yabancı
- 1968: Mezarım Mermerden Olsun
- 1968: Öldürmek Hakkımdır
- 1968: Paydos Muhtar
- 1968: Talihsiz Meryem
- 1968: Yakılacak Kitap
- 1968: Yaşamak Haram Oldu
- 1968: Yasemin'in Tatlı Aşkı
- 1969: Acı İle Karışık
- 1969: Allah Aşkı Yarattı
- 1969: Ana Yüreği
- 1969: Ayşecik'le Ömercik
- 1969: Beyaz Mendilim
- 1969: Bir Şarkısın Sen
- 1969: Dönüşü Olmayan Yol
- 1969: Dost Hançeri
- 1969: Kaderden Kaçılmaz
- 1969: Kadere Boyun Eğdiler
- 1969: Mezarımı Taştan Oyun
- 1969: Namus Fedaisi
- 1969: Sabrın Sonu
- 1969: Seninle Düştüm Dile
- 1969: Şirvan
- 1969: Yaralı Kalp
- 1970: Ali İle Veli
- 1970: Güller Ve Dikenler
- 1970: Kadın Satılmaz
- 1970: Kanıma Kan İsterim
- 1970: Kara Gözlüm
- 1970: Küçük Hanımın Şoförü
- 1970: Linç
- 1970: Merhamet
- 1970: Müthiş Türk
- 1970: Şoför Nebahat
- 1970: Sosyete Şakir
- 1970: Yaralı Ceylan
- 1970: Zindandan Gelen Mektup
- 1971: Altın Prens Devler Ülkesinde
- 1971: Aşk Uğruna
- 1971: Ayşecik ve Sihirli Cüceler Rüyalar Ülkesinde
- 1971: Dişi Tarzan
- 1971: Fakir Aşıkların Romanı
- 1971: Gençliğin Rüyası
- 1971: Gönül Hırsızı
- 1971: Görünce Kurşunlayın
- 1971: Güllü
- 1971: Hasret
- 1971: Her Kurşuna Bir Ölü
- 1971: İntikam Kartalları
- 1971: İşte Deve İşte Hendek
- 1971: Keloğlan Ve Yedi Cüceler
- 1971: Kirli Eller
- 1971: Korkusuz Kaptan Swing
- 1971: Mavi Boncuk Lassi
- 1971: On Küçük Şeytan
- 1971: Turist Ömer Boğa Güreşçisi
- 1971: Vefasız
- 1971: Yedi Kocalı Hürmüz
- 1972: Akma Tuna
- 1972: Aşkların En Güzeli
- 1972: Aynı Yolun Yolcusu
- 1972: Baskın
- 1972: Belalılar Şehri
- 1972: Bitirim
- 1972: Çapkınlar Şahı / Don Juan 72
- 1972: Dinmeyen Sızı
- 1972: Estergon Kalesi
- 1972: Irmak
- 1972: Kadersizler
- 1972: Kadın Yapar
- 1972: Kara Doğan
- 1972: Katerina 72
- 1972: Ver Allahım Ver
- 1972: Yalan Dünya
- 1972: Yazık Oldu Ali'ye
- 1972: Zorbanın Aşkı
- 1973: Anadolu Ekspresi Bakkal Faik
- 1973: Asiye Nasıl Kurtulur?
- 1973: Aşkın Zaferi / Aşk ve Vatan
- 1973: Beklenmeyen Adam
- 1973: Bir Dost Bulamadım
- 1973: Bitirimler Sosyetede
- 1973: Dağ Kanunu
- 1973: Gelin
- 1973: Gönüller Fatihi Yunus
- 1973: Hayat Bayram Olsa
- 1973: Meyro
- 1973: Öksüzler
- 1973: Silahım Namusumdur
- 1973: Yunus Emre
- 1973: Zalim Avcı
- 1974: Atını Seven Kovboy
- 1974: Avşar Beyi
- 1974: Bacım
- 1974: Cici Kız
- 1974: Dövüşe Dövüşe Öldüler
- 1974: Gün Akşam Oldu
- 1974: Kardeş
- 1974: Kardeşim
- 1974: Namus Belası
- 1974: Reisin Kızı
- 1974: Sahipsizler Kasap
- 1974: Salak Milyoner
- 1974: Saymadım Kaç Yıl Oldu
- 1974: Sensiz Yaşanmaz
- 1974: Şirvan
- 1974: Sığıntı
- 1974: Vur Be Ramazan
- 1975: Anahtarı Bendedir
- 1975: Baldız
- 1975: Deli Yusuf
- 1975: Delisin
- 1975: Güler Misin Ağlar Mısın
- 1975: Hasan Almaz Basan Alır
- 1975: Hayret 17
- 1975: Sarı Necmiye / İt Adası
- 1975: Şaşkın Damat
- 1975: Silahım Altı Okka / Silahım Altı Kurşun
- 1975: Vur Davula Tokmağı
- 1976: Adana Urfa Bankası
- 1976: Aşk Dediğin Laftır
- 1976: Bu Nasıl Dünya
- 1976: Bulunmaz Uşak
- 1976: Deli Şahin
- 1976: Her Gönülde Bir Aslan Yatar
- 1976: Meraklı Köfteci
- 1976: Profesyonel / Kadın Çapkın Olunca
- 1976: Şeytan Diyor Ki
- 1976: Süt Kardeşler
- 1976: Tek Başına
- 1977: Al Gülüm Ver Gülüm
- 1977: Ava Giden Avlanır
- 1977: Garip
- 1977: Güllüşah İle İbo
- 1977: Hızlı Giden Yorulur
- 1977: Sahibini Arayan Madalya
- 1977: Sakar Şakir
- 1978: Avanak Apti
- 1978: Çaresiz Rasim
- 1978: Dertli Pınar
- 1978: Hanımevladı
- 1978: İyi Aile Çocuğu
- 1978: Köşeyi Dönen Adam
- 1978: Petrol Kralları
- 1978: Son Sabah
- 1978: Töre
- 1978: Yüz Numaralı Adam
- 1979: Canikom
- 1979: Emekli Başkan
- 1979: Esmerim
- 1979: Gelin Kayası
- 1979: İki Cambaz
- 1979: Nemrud
- 1979: Süpermenler
- 1979: Üç Sevgilim
- 1979: Üç Tatlı Bela
- 1979: Yanmışım
- 1980: Bağrıyanık
- 1980: Banker Bilo
- 1980: Beş Parasız Adam
- 1980: Yarabbim
- 1980: Zübük
- 1981: Gırgır Ali
- 1981: Mutluluk Haram Oldu
- 1981: Şabancık
- 1981: Şaka Yapma
- 1981: Üç Kağıtçı
- 1982: Doktor Civanım
- 1982: Sekiz Sütuna Manşet
- 1982: Şıngırdak Şadiye
- 1982: Yedi Bela Hüsnü
- 1983: Çarıklı Milyoner
- 1983: Erkekçe
- 1983: Futboliye
- 1983: Kahreden Kurşun
- 1983: Kılıbık
- 1983: Tokatçı
- 1984: Çalsın Sazlar
- 1984: Çılgın Arzular
- 1984: Keriz
- 1984: Lodos Zühtü
- 1984: Sevmek Yeniden Doğmak
- 1985: Duyar mısın Feryadımı
- 1985: İşler Tıkırında
- 1986: Ben Milyarder Değilim
- 1986: Çalıkuşu
- 1986: Dayak Cennetten Çıkma
- 1986: Gırgır Hafiye
- 1986: Hekimoğlu
- 1986: İki Milyarlık Bilet
- 1987: Görüş Günü
- 1987: Kuruluş "Osmancık"
- 1987: Sevgi Dünyası
- 1988: Denizden Gelen Kadın
- 1988: Küçüksün Yavrum
- 1988: Kurt Payı
- 1988: Sevimli Hırsız
- 1989: Keko İki Tatlı Serseri
- 1989: Kır Çiçeğim
- 1989: Sahibini Arayan Madalya
- 1990: Can Dostlar
