= Evcilik Oyunu =

- Directed by: Halit Refiğ
- Starring: Göksel Arsoy, Belgin Doruk, and Gürel Ünlüsoy
- Release date: 1964
- Country: Turkey
- Language: Turkish

Evcilik Oyunu is a 1964 Turkish romance film, directed by Halit Refiğ and starring Göksel Arsoy, Belgin Doruk, and Gürel Ünlüsoy.
