= Fatma Bacı =

- Directed by: Halit Refiğ
- Starring: Yildiz Kenter, Fatma Belgen, and Leyla Kenter
- Release date: 1972
- Country: Turkey
- Language: Turkish

Fatma Bacı is a 1972 Turkish drama film, directed by Halit Refiğ and starring Yildiz Kenter, Fatma Belgen, and Leyla Kenter.
