= Bir Türk'e Gönül Verdim =

- Directed by: Halit Refiğ
- Starring: Eva Bender, Ahmet Mekin and Bilal İnci
- Release date: 1969
- Country: Turkey
- Language: Turkish

Bir Türk'e Gönül Verdim is a 1969 Turkish adventure film, directed by Halit Refiğ and starring Eva Bender, Ahmet Mekin and Bilal İnci.
