= Ali Cengiz Oyunu =

- Directed by: Halit Refiğ
- Starring: Izzet Günay; Gülistan Güzey; Hulusi Kentmen; Arzu Okay; Şener Şen; Turgut Özatay; Gül Taner
- Release date: 1971
- Country: Turkey
- Language: Turkish

Ali Cengiz Oyunu is a 1971 Turkish romance film, directed by Halit Refiğ and starring Izzet Günay, Gülistan Güzey, and Hulusi Kentmen.
