= The Girl with the Red Scarf =

- Film poster
- Directed by: Atıf Yılmaz
- Written by: Screenplay: Ali Özgentürk; Novel: Chinghiz Aitmatov
- Produced by: Arif Keskiner
- Starring: Türkan Şoray; Kadir İnanır; İhsan Yüce; Ahmet Mekin
- Cinematography: Çetin Tunca
- Music by: Cahit Berkay
- Production company: Çiçek Film
- Release date: 11 November 1978
- Running time: 95 minutes
- Country: Turkey
- Language: Turkish

The Girl with the Red Scarf (Turkish: Selvi Boylum, Al Yazmalım) is a 1978 Turkish romantic drama film, directed by Atıf Yılmaz based on the short story My poplar in a red scarf by Chinghiz Aitmatov. The film is about a village girl who falls in love with a truck driver from Istanbul. The film, which won three awards, including second best film, at the 15th Antalya "Golden Orange" International Film Festival, was voted one of the 10 Best Turkish Films in a poll carried out by the Ankara Cinema Association.

== Plot ==
İlyas (Kadir İnanır) is a truck driver from Istanbul who comes to a remote village to work in the construction of a dam. When his truck gets stuck in the muddy dirt road, he comes across Asya (Türkan Şoray), a woman from the village who he nicknames Al Yazmalım ('red scarf'). They fall in love, get married and have a child called Samet. One day İlyas stops to help some stranded bystanders, but in doing so, he is delayed and ends up getting fired. When Asya goes to his boss and pleads for İlyas to be reinstated, İlyas is enraged and hits her, then leaves her to start an affair with his former casual girlfriend Dilek (Hülya Tuğlu). When İlyas realises his mistake, he goes back only to find that Asya and his child have left the house. Asya and Samet are wandering by the road when they hitchhike on the back of a truck with a kind stranger Cemşit (Ahmet Mekin). After Cemşit realises that Asya has nowhere to go, he takes pity on them and offers them food and shelter while İlyas searches desperately for them. Samet becomes increasingly fond of Cemşit and Asya begins to see that Samet thinks of him as a father. Then one day after many years, İlyas suddenly appears and Asya is left to make a choice between him and Cemşit.

== Awards ==
The film won the Best Director, Second Best Film and Best Cinematography awards at the 15th Antalya Golden Orange Film Festival. Additionally, Türkan Şoray was awarded the Best Actress award at the Tashkent Film Festival.

== Cast ==
- Türkan Şoray as Asya
- Kadir İnanır as İlyas
- Ahmet Mekin as Cemşit
- Hülya Tuğlu as Dilek
- İhsan Yüce as Ali
- Nurhan Nur as Gülşah
- Cengiz Sezici as Can
- Elif İnci as Samet
- Perihan Doygun as Halime
