= Köpekler Adası =

- Directed by: Halit Refiğ
- Produced by: Cavit Karabag
- Starring: Mursit Bag, Ekrem Dümer, and Tanju Gürsu
- Release date: 1997
- Country: Turkey
- Language: Turkish

Köpekler Adası is a 1997 Turkish film, directed by Halit Refiğ and starring Mursit Bag, Ekrem Dümer, and Tanju Gürsu.
