= Kadir İnanır =

Turkish film actor and director (1949–2026)

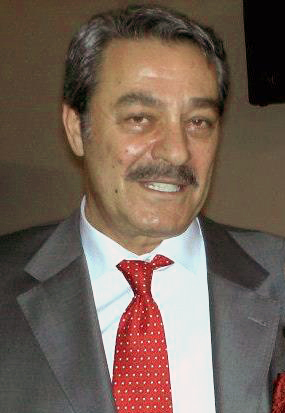
- Born: 15 April 1949; Fatsa, Ordu Province, Turkey
- Died: 26 June 2026 (aged 77); Istanbul, Turkey
- Resting place: Ulus Cemetery, Istanbul
- Occupation: Actor
- Years active: 1968–2026
- Partner: Jülide Kural (2004–2026)

Kadir İnanır (15 April 1949 – 26 June 2026) was a Turkish film actor and director.

== Life and career ==
İnanır was born on 15 April 1949 in Fatsa, a town in the Ordu province of Turkey. In the Turkish movie industry (Yeşilçam) he often portrayed the tough, macho guy, fighting against injustice. Kadir İnanır and Türkan Şoray are one of the most famous partnerships of Yeşilçam Turkish cinema. With Türkan Şoray, he played in Kara Gözlüm, Unutulan Kadın, Dönüş, Gazi Kadın: Nene Hatun, Devlerin Aşkı, Bodrum Hakimi, Deprem, Dila Hanım, Cevriyem, Selvi Boylum Al Yazmalım, Aşk ve Nefret, Gönderilmemiş Mektuplar.

During a 2013 visit to Kosovo, İnanır had a meeting with the Kosovan Minister of Culture Memli Krasniqi who was encouraging cultural and cinematographical cooperation between Kosovo and Turkey. İnanır said that he encouraged the idea and would personally work on the implementation of such a cooperation.

İnanır died from pneumonia on 26 June 2026, at the age of 77. Two days later, he was buried at Ulus Cemetery in Istanbul.

== Filmography ==
=== Film ===
Year	Film	Role	Notes
1968	Dertli Gönlüm		
1968	Kumcu Ali Yaşar	Kumcu Ali Yaşar	
1968	Yedi Adım Sonra		
1969	Fato / Ya İstiklal Ya Ölüm	Kuleli Orhan	
1969	Yaralı Kalp	Ersin	
1969	Çılgınlar Cehennemi	Murat	
1970	Ankara Express	Maximillian	
1970	Dağların Kartalı	Kerem	
1970	Dört Kabadayı		
1970	Kara Gözlüm	Kenan	
1970	Meçhul Kadın	Murat Acar	
1970	Yemen'de Bir Avuç Türk	Mülazım Ahmet	
1971	Aslanlar Kükreyince		
1971	Azrailin Beş Atlısı	Kartal	
1971	Kadifeden Kesesi	Ali	
1971	Kara Gün	Ali	
1971	Kerem İle Aslı	Kerem	
1971	Mualla	Cevat Kartal	
1971	Tophaneli Ahmet	Ahmet	
1971	Unutulan Kadın	Kenan Haloğlu	
1971	Üç Arkadaş	Murat	
1972	Asi Gençler	Savaş Tekin	
1972	Seks Ve Cinayet	Yılmaz	
1972	Baskın	Yedi Bela Salim	
1972	Dönüş	İbrahim	
1972	Hesapta Bu Yoktu		
1972	Kanlı Para	Murat	
1972	Kopuk	Kopuk Ali	
1972	Leyla İle Mecnun	Ali	
1972	Paprika Gaddarın Aşkı	Kadir	
1972	Tophaneli Murat	Murat	
1972	Utanç	Kemal	
1972	Uçurum	Ömer	
1972	Vahşi Arzu	Vahşi Arzu	
1972	Vur		
1972	İnsafsızlar		
1973	Anadolu Ekspresi	Halil Uysal	
1973	Arap Abdo	Arap Abdo	
1973	Bitirim Kardeşler	Ali	
1973	Bitirim Sosyetede	Ali	
1973	Ezo Gelin	Ali	
1973	Gazi Kadın / Nene Hatun	Ahmet	
1973	Hayat Bayram Olsa	Doğan Barutoğlu	
1973	Kambur	Ali	
1973	Yaban	Yaban Ali	
1973	Ölüme Koşanlar	Nuri	
1974	Almanyalı Yarim	Murat	
1974	Askerin Dönüşü	Ali	
1974	Bir Yabancı	Ali	
1974	Ceza	Ali	
1974	Enayi	Metin	
1974	Korkusuzlar	Metin	
1974	Sahipsizler	Gaddar	
1974	Sensiz Yaşanmaz	Topal Kemal Tekin	
1974	Uyanık Kardeşler	Doğan	
1974	Yazık Oldu Yarınlara	Tayfun	
1975	Baldız	Hasan Terbasan	
1975	Köprü	Ahmet	
1975	Pisi Pisi	Sinan	
1975	Yatak Hikayemiz	Tarık	
1976	Alev	Yağmur	
1976	Bodrum Hakimi	Ömer	
1976	Can Pazarı	Murat	Bilingual film
1976	Delicesine	Şevket	
1976	Deprem	Ahmet	
1976	Devlerin Aşkı	Tarık	
1976	Silahlara Veda	Ali Duran	
1976	Taksi Şoförü	Mehmet	
1976	İki Kızgın Adam	Murat	Bilingual film
1977	Ana Ocağı	Kadir Aksoy	
1977	Dila Hanım	Karadağlı Rıza	
1977	Selvi Boylum Al Yazmalım	Ilyas	
1977	Fırtına	Fırtına	
1977	Kan	Kadir	
1977	Silah Arkadaşları	Murat	
1977	Tövbekar	Küçükpazarlı Murat	
1978	Cevriyem	Ahmet	
1978	Derviş Bey	Derviş	
1978	Düzen	Adanalı Kemal	
1978	Evlidir Ne Yapsa Yeridir	Mecnun	
1979	Doktor	Ali Gönenç	
1979	Fırat	Kadir	
1979	Gazeteci	Kemal	
1979	İstanbul 79	Ömer	
1979	İsyan	Apo	
1979	Target	Cengiz	Bilingual film
1981	Ah Güzel İstanbul	Kamil	
1981	Kırık Bir Aşk Hikayesi	Fuat	
1982	Amansızlar		
1982	Aşkların En Güzeli	Kadir	
1982	Elveda Dostum	Dursun	
1982	Tomruk	Kürşat Çavuş	
1982	Yürek Yarası	Davut	
1983	Bedel	Avukat Kemal	
1983	Kurban	Şahin Kara	
1984	Balayı	Kemal	
1984	A Sip of Love	Cemal	
1984	Güneş Doğarken	Kara Davut	
1984	Yabancı	İmrahor'lu Kadir	
1984	İmparator	Mardinli Kadir	
1985	Amansız Yol	Hasan	
1985	Ateş Dağlı	Ateşdağlı Bekir	
1985	Seyyid	Seyyid	
1985	Yaz Bitti	Savaş	
1985	Yılanların Öcü	Kara Bayram	
1985	Ölüm Yolu	Mehmet	
1986	Dikenli Yol	Hüseyin	
1986	Güneşe Köprü	Musa	
1986	Hayat Köprüsü	Metin	
1986	Sen Türkülerini Söyle	Hayri	
1986	Sevgi Çıkmazı	Kadir	
1986	Sultanoğlu	Murat	
1986	Suçumuz İnsan Olmak	Nuri	
1986	Umut Sokağı	Ali Silvan	
1986	Yarın Ağlayacağım	Kemal	
1987	72. Koğuş	Ahmet Kaptan	
1987	Katırcılar	Rüstem	
1987	Küçüğüm		
1987	Menekşeler Mavidir	Orhan	
1987	Sen De Yüreğinde Sevgiye Yer Aç	Ali İhsan	
1987	Yaralı Can		
1987	Yarınsız Adam	Cema	
1988	Bir Beyin Oğlu	Bekir	
1988	Emanet	Tahir	
1988	Hüzün Çemberi	Kemal	
1988	Yedi Uyuyanlar	Çetin	
1989	Acılar Paylaşılmaz	Avukat Erdoğan	
1989	Filim Bitti		
1989	Karılar Koğuşu	Kemal Tahir	
1989	Kavgamız	Kemal Bostancı	
1989	Medcezir Manzaraları	Erol Ersoy	
1990	Darbe		
1990	Eskici ve Oğulları	Mehmet	
1990	Sayın Başkan	Şafak	
1990	Tatar Ramazan	Tatar Ramazan	
1991	Ah Gardaşım	Haşmet	
1991	Aldatacağım	Savaş Pınarlı	
1991	Umut Hep Vardı	Şahan	
1992	Tatar Ramazan Sürgünde	Tatar Ramazan	
1994	Aşk Ölümden Soğuktur	Ali	
2001	Commissar Shakespeare		
2002	Gönderilmemiş Mektuplar	Cem	
2006	Sinema Bir Mucizedir / Büyülü Fener	Nakip Ali	
2008	Son Cellat	Bayram	
2011	Ünye de Fatsa Arası	Himself	
2012	Elveda Katya	Yunus	
2013	Geç Gelen Ödüller	Himself	
2014	Sinemada İstanbul : Kadrajdaki Şehir	Himself	
2019	Kapı	Yakup	

=== Television ===
- 1992: Savcı

=== Director ===
- 1991: Ah Gardaşım
- 1992: Savcı

== Sources ==
- Biography of Kadir İnanır at Biyografi.info

Awards
Preceded by Yılmaz Güney	Golden Boll Award for Best Actor; 1972 for Utanç	Succeeded by Cüneyt Arkın
Preceded by Hakan Balamir	Golden Orange Award for Best Actor; 1986 for Yılanların Öcü	Succeeded by Şener Şen
