= Şeytan =

- Theatrical Poster
- Directed by: Metin Erksan
- Written by: Yılmaz Tümtürk
- Produced by: Hulki Saner
- Starring: Cihan Ünal; Erol Amaç; İsmail Hakkı Şen; Ahmet Turgutlu; Agah Hün; Ali Taygun; Ekrem Gökkaya; Ferdi Merter; Meral Taygun; Muzaffer Yenen; Sabahat Işık; Canan Perver; Ergün Rona; Ahu Tuğba
- Cinematography: Nihat Çifteoğlu
- Release date: November 1, 1974
- Running time: 101 minutes
- Country: Turkey
- Language: Turkish

Şeytan ("Devil") is a 1974 Turkish cult horror film directed by Metin Erksan that plagiarizes William Friedkin’s The Exorcist (1973).

The film was apparently shot with a low budget, resulting in a grainy and poor image quality, and is essentially a shot-for-shot remake of The Exorcist, with only minor differences. Şeytan was out of print until 2007, when it was released on DVD.

== Synopsis ==
Gül and her mother are a family with rich lives. Gül's mother and father are on the verge of separation. Gül's mother and Ekrem want to get married. But the mother does not think much about marrying Ekrem. Gül's birthday comes. Gül's father cannot come to this birthday. Again, there are violent arguments between the parents. Gül is experiencing psychological problems in the meantime. While an imam and doctors try to understand what happened to Gül, they will finally understand that Gül has a devil inside her. The imam and Tuğrul Bilge will struggle to get the devil out of Gül. Although the devil plays various games to mislead Tuğrul Bilge, these games will be in vain thanks to the imam. When the devil leaves Gül's body, he enters Tuğrul Bilge's body. Tuğrul Bilge throws himself out of the window and dies before the devil takes his body captive. However, the devil returns to the world of extravagance again. Gül does not remember these events and returns to her old joy.

== Release ==
The film, which went on nationwide general release across Turkey on November 1, 1974, is commonly known as "Turkish Exorcist" because of plot and stylistic similarities copied from The Exorcist.

== Cast ==
Actor/Actress	Role
Canan Perver	Gül
Cihan Ünal	Tuğrul Bilge
Meral Taygun	Gül's mother
Agah Hün	Cinci
Erol Amaç	Police chief
Ahu Tuğba	Maid

== See also ==
- 1974 in film
