= Ahmet Mekin =

Turkish actor

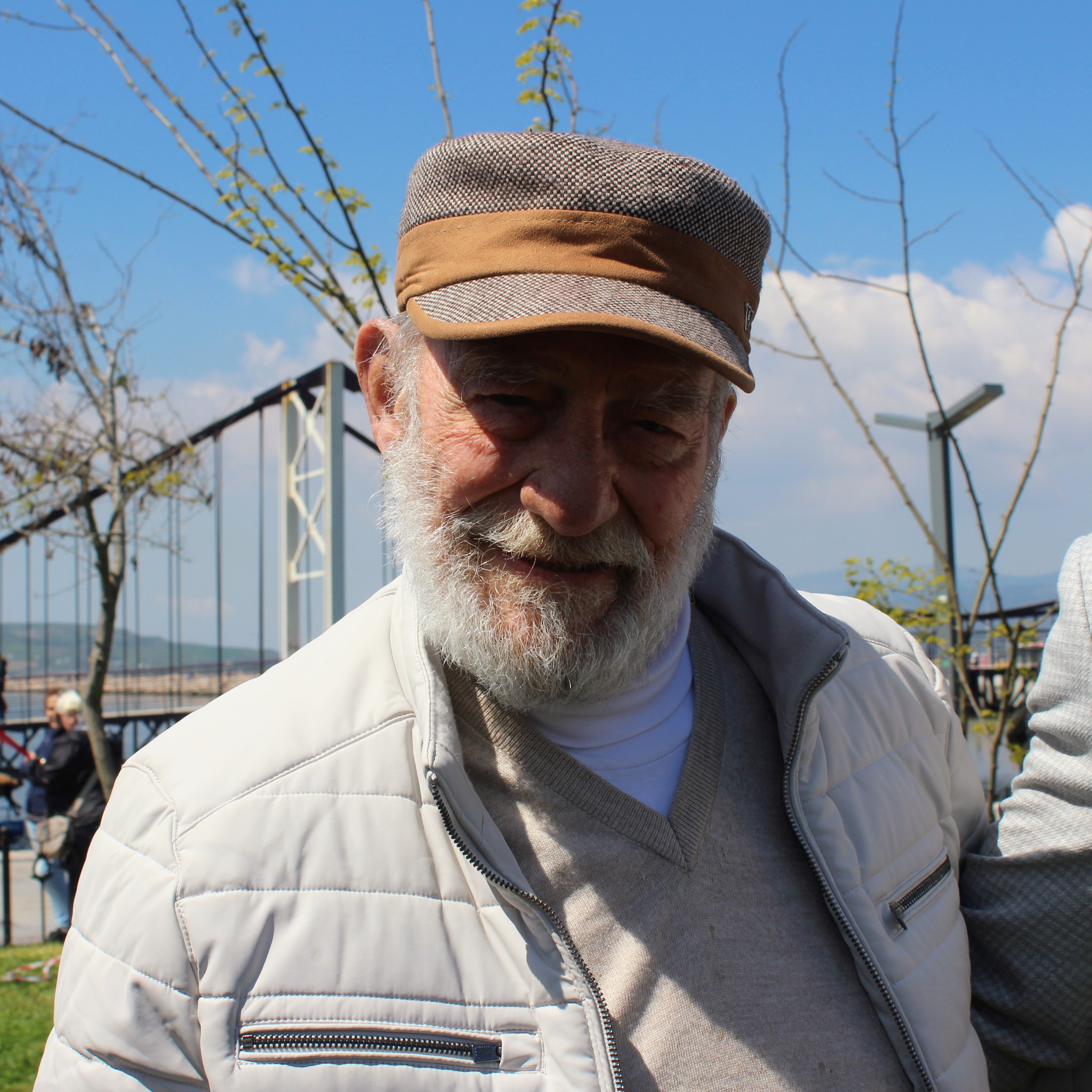
- Born: Ahmet Kurteli; 6 August 1932 (age 93); Istanbul, Turkey
- Occupation: Actor
- Height: 1.75 m (5 ft 9 in)
- Spouse: Şükran Sabuncu (m. 1957; died 2020)
- Children: 2

Ahmet Mekin (born Ahmet Kurteli, 6 August 1932) is a Turkish actor.

== Biography ==
Ahmet Mekin was born as Ahmet Kurteli in Istanbul and began his career in theatre. He made his film debut in Mahşere Kadar in 1957 and went on to appear in nearly 200 films, among them Aşktan da Üstün, Kelebekler Çift Uçar, Bir Türk'e Gönül Verdim, Düğün and Selvi Boylum Al Yazmalım. He was married to actress Şükran Sabuncu.

== Selected filmography ==
- Aşktan da Üstün (1960)
- Kelebekler Çift Uçar (1964)
- Urfa İstanbul (1968)
- Bir Türk'e Gönül Verdim (1969)
- Çaresizler (1973)
- Düğün (1974)
- Bir Adam Yaratmak (1977)
- Selvi Boylum Al Yazmalım (1977)
- Kanun Kanundur (1984)
- Ateş Dağlı (1985)
- Kavanozdaki Adam (1987)
- Kuruluş (1987)
