= Son Darbe =

- Directed by: Halit Refiğ
- Produced by: Yaşar Tunalı
- Starring: Tarık Akan, Nilgün Akçaoğlu and Yıldırım Gencer
- Cinematography: Hüseyin Özşahin
- Music by: Cahit Berkay
- Production company: Topkapı Film
- Release date: March 1986
- Country: Turkey
- Language: Turkish

Son Darbe is a 1985 Turkish adventure film, directed by Halit Refiğ and starring Tarık Akan, Nilgün Akçaoğlu and Yıldırım Gencer.
