= Sev Kardeşim =

- Directed by: Ertem Eğilmez
- Starring: Hülya Koçyiğit; Tarık Akan
- Release date: 1972
- Running time: 1h 26min
- Country: Turkey
- Language: Turkish

Sev Kardeşim is a 1972 Turkish comedy film directed by Ertem Eğilmez.

== Cast ==
- Hülya Koçyiğit - Alev Güler
- Tarık Akan - Ferit Çaliskan
- Münir Özkul - Mesut Güler
- Adile Naşit - Mesude
- Turgut Boralı - Maksut Güler
- Halit Akçatepe - Ali
- Necdet Yakın - Alev'in Dayisi
- Hulusi Kentmen - Cemal Çaliskan
- Nedret Güvenç - Ferit'in Annesi
- Zeki Alasya - Avukat
