= Kızın Varmı Derdin Var =

- Directed by: Halit Refiğ
- Starring: Ayhan Işık, Perihan Savaş and Öztoprak Ünsal
- Release date: 1973
- Country: Turkey
- Language: Turkish

Kızın Varmı Derdin Var is a 1973 Turkish film, directed by Halit Refiğ and starring Ayhan Işık, Perihan Savaş and Öztoprak Ünsal.
