= Beyaz Ölüm =

- Directed by: Halit Refiğ
- Starring: Tarik Akan, Ahu Tugba, and Yaprak Özdemiroglu
- Release date: 1983
- Country: Turkey
- Language: Turkish

Beyaz Ölüm is a 1983 Turkish crime drama film, directed by Halit Refiğ and starring Tarik Akan, Ahu Tugba, and Yaprak Özdemiroglu.
