= Ölüm Yolu =

- Directed by: Halit Refiğ
- Starring: Kadir Inanir, Hülya Avsar, and Tanju Gürsu
- Release date: 1985
- Country: Turkey
- Language: Turkish

Ölüm Yolu is a 1985 Turkish adventure film, directed by Halit Refiğ and starring Kadir Inanir, Hülya Avsar, and Tanju Gürsu.
