= Yedi Evlat İki Damat =

- Directed by: Halit Refiğ
- Produced by: Hürrem Erman
- Starring: Cüneyt Gökçer; Perihan Savaş
- Production company: Erman Film
- Release date: 1973
- Country: Turkey
- Language: Turkish

Yedi Evlat İki Damat is a 1973 Turkish comedy-drama film, directed by Halit Refiğ and starring Cüneyt Gökçer and Perihan Savaş.

== Cast ==
- Cüneyt Gökçer - Hüsnü
- Perihan Savaş - Perihan
- Mesut Engin - Tugrul
- Ayşen Cansev - Neslihan
- Yaşar Yağmur - Sedat
