= Şehrazat (film) =

- Directed by: Halit Refiğ
- Starring: Orhan Günsiray, Leyla Sayar, and Nilüfer Aydan
- Release date: 1964
- Country: Turkey
- Language: Turkish

Şehrazat is a 1964 Turkish crime thriller film, directed by Halit Refiğ and starring Orhan Günsiray, Leyla Sayar, and Nilüfer Aydan.
