= Karılar Koğuşu =

- Directed by: Halit Refiğ
- Story by: Kemal Tahir
- Produced by: Türker İnanoğlu
- Starring: Irem Altug; Kadir İnanır; Hülya Koçyiğit; Perihan Savaş; Erol Taş; Tuncer Necmioğlu; Ayşegül Ünsal; Serra Yılmaz
- Music by: Melih Kibar
- Release date: 1990
- Running time: 125 minutes
- Country: Turkey
- Language: Turkish

Karılar Koğuşu is a 1990 Turkish drama film, directed by Halit Refiğ and starring Irem Altug, Kadir Inanir, and Hülya Koçyigit.

== Plot ==
About Kemal Tahir's 3 months in prison and his time spent there

== Awards ==
- 1990 Antalya Golden Orange Film Festival, "Best Film" Award
- 1990 Antalya Golden Orange Film Festival, "Best Director" Award, Halit Refiğ
- 1990 Antalya Golden Orange Film Festival, "Best Actress" Award, Hülya Koçyiğit
- 1990 Antalya Golden Orange Film Festival, "Best Supporting Actress" Award, Ayşegül Ünsal
- 1990 Antalya Golden Orange Film Festival, "Best Supporting Actor" Award, Tuncer Necmioğlu
