= Yasak Aşk =

- Directed by: Halit Refiğ
- Starring: Nilüfer Aydan; Efgan Efekan; Cahit Irgat
- Release date: 1961
- Country: Turkey
- Language: Turkish

Yasak Aşk is a 1961 Turkish romantic drama film, directed by Halit Refiğ and starring Nilüfer Aydan, Efgan Efekan, and Cahit Irgat.
