= Stranger in the City (1962 film) =

1962 Turkish film

- Directed by: Halit Refiğ
- Written by: Halit Refiğ; Vedat Türkali
- Produced by: Nusret Ikbal
- Starring: Göksel Arsoy
- Release date: 1962
- Running time: 75 minutes
- Country: Turkey
- Language: Turkish

Stranger in the City (Turkish: Şehirdeki Yabancı) is a 1962 Turkish drama film directed by Halit Refiğ. It was entered into the 3rd Moscow International Film Festival.

== Cast ==
- Göksel Arsoy as Aydin
- Nilüfer Aydan as Gönül
- Reha Yurdakul as Selami Agaçligil
- Ali Sen as Serafettin Toraman
- Talat Gözbak as Mustafa Bakirci (as Talât Gözbak)
- Erol Tas as Nazif Usta
