= The Bride (1973 Turkish film) =

- Theatrical poster
- Directed by: Ömer Lütfi Akad
- Written by: Ömer Lütfi Akad
- Produced by: Hürrem Erman
- Starring: Hülya Koçyiğit; Kerem Yılmazer; Kahraman Kıral; Ali Şen; Aliye Rona; Kamuran Usluer; Nazan Adalı; Seden Kızıltunç
- Cinematography: Gani Turanlı
- Music by: Yalçın Tura
- Production company: Erman Film
- Distributed by: Ören Film
- Release date: 1 April 1973
- Running time: 97 minutes
- Country: Turkey
- Language: Turkish

The Bride (Turkish: Gelin) is a 1973 Turkish drama film written and directed by Ömer Lütfi Akad about a young woman who moves with her husband and sick child to Istanbul. The film, which won three awards, including best film, at the 5th Adana "Golden Boll" International Film Festival, was voted one of the 10 Best Turkish Films by the Ankara Cinema Association.

== Synopsis ==
A young woman moves with her husband and small child to her husband's family in Istanbul. Her son becomes ill and the doctor tells her that he will soon die if he doesn't get an operation. The family refuses to help her because they can't see anything wrong with the boy and all money is needed for a new shop they have just opened. When her son dies she takes a desperate step.

== Release ==
=== Festival screenings ===
- 5th Adana "Golden Boll" International Film Festival
- 39th Karlovy Vary International Film Festival
- The 2014 BFI London Film Festival

== Reception ==
=== Awards ===
- 5th Adana "Golden Boll" International Film Festival
  - Best Film
  - Best Supporting Actor
  - Best Supporting Actress

== See also ==
- 1973 in film
- Turkish films of the 1970s
