= Fikret Hakan =

Turkish actor and film director (1934–2017)

- Born: Gaffar Bumin Çıtanak; 23 April 1934; Balıkesir, Turkey
- Died: 11 July 2017 (aged 83); Kartal, Istanbul, Turkey
- Burial place: Zincirlikuyu Cemetery
- Education: Galatasaray High School
- Occupation: Actor
- Spouses: Lale Sarı (m. 1963; div. 1964) Semiramis Pekkan (m. 1964; div. 1964): Neşecan Taşmak (divorced); Hümeyra (m. 1971; div. 1971): Zeynep Hakan (divorced)
- Partner: Tijen Kılıç
- Awards: Golden Orange Award for Best Actor; (1971, 1979); Golden Orange Award for Best Supporting Actor (1993); Golden Orange Life Achievement Award (1998)

Fikret Hakan (born Gaffar Bumin Çıtanak; 23 April 1934 – 11 July 2017) was a prolific Turkish film actor and a recipient of the honorary State Artist, a title awarded by the Turkish government.

Hakan was born as Gaffar Bumin Çıtanak in 1934 to Gaffar and Fatma Belkıs. His mother was a head nurse while his father was a literature teacher. He moved along with his parents as a teenager from Balikesir to Istanbul, and enrolled in Galatasaray High School.

Hakan began his artistic career in 1950 as an actor for the Ses Theatre and a contributor to literary magazines.

Making his debut in Evli mi bekar mi, a short comedy directed by Muhsin Ertugrul in 1951, and his feature film debut in 1953 in Köprüalti Çocuklari (Kids Under the Bridge), he has made over 170 appearances in film to date, although his career was at its most productive throughout the 1950s and 1960s through to 1976.

He starred in films such as Revenge of the Snakes (Yılanların öcü) in 1962. Hakan appeared as Colonel Ahmed Elçi along with Tony Curtis and Charles Bronson in the 1970-movie You Can't Win 'Em All directed by Peter Collinson.

Hakan made four marriages. His spouses were Lale Sarı, Semiramis Pekkan, Neşecan Paşmak and Hümeyra. He had an extramarital daughter Elif Hakan. Lately, he had a life partner Tijen Kılıç. He died on 11 July 2017 at a hospital in Istanbul after being diagnosed with lung cancer. He was interred at Zincirlikuyu Cemetery following a memorial ceremony held at Istanbul University's Faculty of Science, and the religious funeral in Afet Yolal Mosque in Levent.

== Filmografisi ==
=== Oyuncu olarak ===
- 1953: Köprüaltı Çocukları
- 1953: Hoşgör, Boşver, Aldırma (Memo Festivalde)
- 1954: Cingöz Recai
- 1954: Yollarımız Ayrılıyor
- 1955: Battal Gazi Geliyor
- 1955: Beyaz Mendil
- 1955: Gülmeyen Yüzler
- 1955: Karacaoğlan
- 1956: Ölüm Deresi
- 1956: Papatya
- 1957: Ak Altın
- 1957: Gelinin Muradı
- 1957: Kahpe Kurşun
- 1957: Kamelyalı Kadın
- 1957: Kör Kuyu
- 1957: Lejyon Dönüşü
- 1958: Üç Arkadaş
- 1958: Allah Korkusu
- 1958: Bir İnsanlık Meselesi (Allah Korusun)
- 1958: Dertli Irmak
- 1958: Dokuz Dağın Efesi
- 1958: Son Saadet
- 1959: Zümrüt – Selim
- 1961: Hatırla Sevgilim
- 1961: Camp Der Verdammten
- 1961: İstanbul'da Aşk Başkadır
- 1961: Şeytanın Kılıcı
- 1961: Silahlar Konuşuyor
- 1962: Aşk Yarışı
- 1962: Kısmetin En Güzeli
- 1962: Ölüme Yalnız Gidilir
- 1962: Yılanların Öcü
- 1962: Aşk Orada Başladı
- 1962: Battı Balık
- 1962: Sokak Kızı
- 1963: Aşka Vakit Yok
- 1963: Badem Şekeri
- 1963: Bana Annemi Anlat
- 1963: Cehennemde Buluşalım (Comp Der Verdammten)
- 1963: Katır Tırnağı
- 1963: Öldür Beni
- 1963: Zehir Hafiye
- 1964: Affetmeyen Kadın
- 1964: Atçalı Kel Mehmet
- 1964: Bücür
- 1964: Keşanlı Ali Destanı
- 1964: Avanta Kemal
- 1964: Karanlıkta Uyananlar
- 1965: Cumartesi Senin Pazar Benim
- 1965: Dağlar Kralı (Köroğlu)
- 1965: Korkusuzlar
- 1965: Başlık
- 1965: Bitmeyen Yol
- 1965: Buzlar Çözülmeden
- 1965: Dünkü Çocuk
- 1965: Murat'ın Türküsü
- 1965: Onyedinci Yolcu
- 1965: Siyah Gözler
- 1965: Uzakta Kal Sevgilim
- 1966: Ölüm Tarlası
- 1966: Babam Katil Değildi
- 1966: Dövüşmek Şart Oldu
- 1966: Erkek Ve Dişi
- 1966: Her Şafakta Ölürüm
- 1966: Hızır Efe
- 1966: Korkusuz Adam
- 1966: Nuh'un Gemisi
- 1966: Toprağın Kanı
- 1967: Bozkurtlar Geliyor
- 1967: Çıldırtan Arzu
- 1967: Devlerin İntikamı
- 1967: Eceline Susayanlar
- 1967: Kan Davası
- 1967: Silahları Ellerinde Öldüler
- 1968: Kara Battal'ın Acısı
- 1968: Kafkas Kartalı
- 1968: Şeyh Ahmed
- 1968: Şeytan Kafesi
- 1969: Mısır'dan Gelen Gelin
- 1969: Devlerin Aşkı
- 1969: Günahını Kanlarıyla Ödediler
- 1969: Target: Harry
- 1970: You Can't Win 'Em All (Paralı Askerler) - Albay Ahmet Elçi
- 1971: Battal Gazi Destanı
- 1971: New Yorklu Kız
- 1971: Şehzade Sinbad Kaf Dağında
- 1971: Vurguncular
- 1971: Fedailer Mangası
- 1971: Gülüm, Balım, Çiçeğim
- 1971: Hasret
- 1971: Öldüren Şehir
- 1971: Ölümsüzler
- 1971: Trittico
- 1972: Cemo
- 1972: Elif İle Seydo
- 1973: Pir Sultan Abdal
- 1973: Büyük Soygun
- 1974: Dayı
- 1974: Dört Hergele
- 1974: Kısmet
- 1975: En Büyük Patron
- 1975: Köprü
- 1975: Pembe İncili Kaftan
- 1976: İki Arkadaş
- 1976: Gülşah Küçük Anne
- 1976: Delicesine
- 1976: Hora Geliyor Hora
- 1976: Kaplan Pençesi
- 1976: Kurban Olayım
- 1976: Sürgün
- 1977: Yangın
- 1977: Yuvanın Bekçileri
- 1979: Demiryol
- 1980: Beni Böyle Sev
- 1980: Bir Günün Hikâyesi
- 1981: Öğretmen Kemal
- 1981: Takip
- 1981: Unutulmayanlar
- 1981: Bir Damla Ateş
- 1981: Kimbilir (Kibariye)
- 1981: Toprağın Teri
- 1982: Arkadaşım
- 1982: Düşkünüm Sana
- 1983: Haram
- 1983: Küçük Ağa
- 1984: Fidan
- 1984: Acı Ekmek
- 1985: Alkol
- 1986: Duvardaki Kan
- 1986: Aşkın Kanunu Yoktur
- 1986: Gün Doğmadan
- 1986: Savunma
- 1987: O Bir Melekti
- 1987: Severek Öldüler
- 1987: Yazgı
- 1988: Acıların Günlüğü
- 1988: Hüküm
- 1989: İstiyorum
- 1989: Dehşet Gecesi
- 1989: Gülbeyaz
- 1989: Kara Sevda
- 1989: Sessiz Fırtına
- 1990: Eskici Ve Oğulları
- 1990: Hanımın Çiftliği
- 1992: Sevgi Demeti
- 1993: Yalancı
- 1994: Gerilla
- 1994: İnsanlar Yaşadıkça
- 1995: Sen De Gitme
- 1996: Anılardaki Sevgili
- 1996: Ekmek
- 1998: Her şey Oğlum İçin
- 1998: Yaşama Hakkı
- 1999: Aşkın Dağlarda Gezer
- 1999: Baba
- 2000: Aslan Oğlum
- 2000: Para=Dolar
- 2000: Zümrüt Gözlerim Aklına Gelirse
- 2001: Benimle Evlenir Misin
- 2001: Yeni Hayat
- 2002: Zor Hedef
- 2003: Kurşun Yarası
- 2003: Şıh Senem
- 2005: Eğreti Gelin
- 2006: Kaybolan Yıllar
- 2008: Umut
- 2009: Unutulmaz
- 2014: Birleşen Gönüller

=== Senarist olarak ===
- 1971: Sürgünden Geliyorum
- 1973: Cennetin Kapısı
- 1975: En Büyük Patron
- 1976: Sürgün

=== Yapımcı olarak ===
- 1976: Sürgün

=== Yönetmen olarak ===
- 1971: Sürgünden Geliyorum
- 1973: Cennetin Kapısı
- 1975: En Büyük Patron
- 1976: Hammal
- 1976: Sürgün
