= Satın Alınan Adam =

- Directed by: Arşavir Alyanak
- Written by: Arşavir Alyanak
- Produced by: Şahin Haki
- Cinematography: Costas Prosos
- Music by: Kadri Şençalar
- Production company: Melek Film
- Release date: 1960
- Country: Turkey
- Language: Turkish

Satın Alınan Adam is a Turkish film directed by Arshavir Alyanak. The film got inspired from a novel.

== Plot ==
The main character in the movie is an amateur writer whose marriage was aimed get money for making his dream to come true. Naci who worked for one of the wealthy lawyer got an offer that if he married the daughter of the lawyer Mine, he would be given adequate money and printing press to publish his writings. But according to the deal, the couple must divorce at the end of the year. As he accepted the offer, Naci was able to publish his writings. However, the marriage of Naci and Mine will have unexpected results.

== Actors ==
- Goksel Arsoy
- Belgin Doruk
- Mualla Fırat
- Nubar Terziyan
- Salih Tozan
- Mümtaz Ener
- Semih Sezerli
- Necdet Tosun
