= Birds of Exile =

1964 Turkish drama film

- Poster
- Directed by: Halit Refiğ
- Written by: Orhan Kemal; Halit Refiğ
- Produced by: Recep Ekicigil
- Starring: Tanju Gürsu; Filiz Akın; Özden Çelik
- Release date: 12 April 1964
- Running time: 102 minutes
- Country: Turkey
- Language: Turkish

Birds of Exile (Turkish: Gurbet Kuşları) is a 1964 Turkish drama film, directed by Halit Refiğ and starring Tanju Gürsu, Filiz Akın, Özden Çelik and Cüneyt Arkın in his acting debut.

== Cast ==
- Cüneyt Arkın as Selim
- Filiz Akın as Ayla Jeyan
- Özden Çelik as Kemal Bakırcıoğlu
- Pervin Par as Fatma Bakırcıoğlu
- Tanju Gürsu as Murat
- Önder Somer as Orhan
- Sevda Ferdağ as Seval/Naciye
- Hüseyin Baradan as Haybeci
- Mümtaz Ener as Tahir Bakırcıoğlu
