= Yarın Ağlayacağım =

- Directed by: Halit Refiğ
- Starring: Kadir İnanır; Yaprak Özdemiroğlu; Gül Erda
- Release date: 1986
- Country: Turkey
- Language: Turkish

Yarın Ağlayacağım is a 1986 Turkish drama film, directed by Halit Refiğ and starring Kadir İnanır, Yaprak Özdemiroğlu and Gül Erda.
