= Cennetin Kapısı =

- Directed by: Fikret Hakan and Halit Refiğ
- Starring: Fikret Hakan, Arzu Okay and Sevda Ferdağ
- Release date: 1973
- Country: Turkey
- Language: Turkish

Cennetin Kapısı is a 1973 Turkish drama film, directed by Fikret Hakan and Halit Refiğ and starring Hakan, Arzu Okay and Sevda Ferdağ.
