= Vurun Kahpeye =

- Directed by: Lütfi Ömer Akad
- Screenplay by: Lütfi Ömer Akad; Selahattin Küçük
- Based on: Vurun Kahpeye by Halide Edib Adıvar
- Produced by: Hasan Erman, Hürrem Erman
- Starring: Sezer Sezin; Ali Rıza Şenel; Arşavir Alyanak; Fahri Güneş; Hüseyin Tuncalı; Kemal Tanrıöver; Mahmure Handan; Necil Ozon; Nurdoğan Öztürk; Semih Evin; Settar Körmükçü; Şevket Aktunç; Temel Karamahmut; Vedat Örfi Bengü; Cahit Irgat; Vahi Öz; Sami Ayanoğlu
- Edited by: Lütfi Ömer Akad; Özen Sermet
- Music by: Sadi Işılay
- Release date: 1973
- Country: Turkey
- Language: Turkish

Vurun Kahpeye is a 1973 Turkish drama film, directed by Halit Refiğ and starring Hale Soygazi, Tugay Toksöz, and Tanju Gürsu.

Vurun Kahpeye marks the directorial debut of Lütfi Ömer Akad, who also worked on the initial editing of the film before Özen Sermet revised it. The idea for the adaptation originated with Sezer Sezin, and the screenplay was co-written by Lütfi Ömer Akad and Selahattin Küçük. Halide Edib Adıvar approved the project after reviewing the treatment prepared by the writers. Hürrem Erman, the producer, offered Akad the directorial role.

The film is regarded as a "turning point in Turkish cinema" by some critics. It is also considered a transitional film that marked the separation of Turkish cinema from theater.

The film initially received significant public interest but faced backlash from conservative groups, leading to censorship. It was censored three times before continuing its screenings.

A restored version of the film was screened during the 28th Istanbul International Film Festival held from 4–19 April 2009.
