= Karakolda Ayna Var =

- Directed by: Halit Refiğ
- Starring: Sadri Alisik, Fatma Girik, and Suphi Tekniker
- Release date: 1966
- Country: Turkey
- Language: Turkish

Karakolda Ayna Var is a 1966 Turkish comedy film, directed by Halit Refiğ and starring Sadri Alisik, Fatma Girik, and Suphi Tekniker.
