= Law of the Border =

1966 film

- Directed by: Ömer Lütfi Akad
- Written by: Lüfti Akad, Yılmaz Güney
- Screenplay by: Yılmaz Güney
- Produced by: Kadir Kesemen / Cahit Gürpinar
- Starring: Yılmaz Güney; Pervin Par; Erol Taş
- Cinematography: Ali Uğur
- Edited by: Ali Ün
- Music by: Nida Tüfekçi
- Production company: Yildiz Film Studios / Dadaş Film
- Distributed by: Dadaş Film
- Release date: 1967
- Running time: 76 minutes
- Country: Turkey
- Language: Turkish

Law of the Border (Turkish: Hudutların Kanunu) is a 1967 Turkish drama film, written by Yılmaz Güney, and directed by Lütfi Ömer Akad.

== Themes ==
While the main story is about smuggling and a father Hidir (played by Yilmaz Güney) without a future fighting to give a future to his young son Yusuf (played by Hikmet Olgun), it is as much about the forces that push Hidir and his fellow villagers to smuggle and a telling of the plight of the poor and alienated group of people struggling to survive the only way they ever knew, from father to son. Faith Akin states that "Hudutların Kanunu underlines the importance of education, which is the crucial element of socio-economical progress in third world countries." This is the main message of the movie, to have the options to educate and to make a life is as important as hard work, that without a chance, people stagnate, even great people. Hidir is the symbol of that stagnation while his son shows hope of the future, a way out of the cycle. It also shows the great divide of the haves and have nots, an old way of life fighting to survive while the new way comes along too late to save any but the children. The film shows the violence of this system and the manipulation of the corrupt, as it also shows the good intentions of authority misused by the wealthy to hurt the poor. The film repeatedly shows the inability of people to get past social structures and economics and almost pleads with the viewer to think about the plight of the villagers and give them a chance to let them grow as humans. Yet in the end reality crashes in while duty, survival, and emotions take over nobility, and people revert to what they know, be it teacher, commander, smuggler, or profiteer. Other themes like a horse, nomadic culture vs. a car sedentary culture are explored to lesser degrees, yet are very deliberate and help symbolize the divide in society.

== Cast ==
- Yılmaz Güney - Hidir
- Pervin Par - Ayse, the teacher
- Erol Taş - Ali Cello
- Tuncel Kurtiz - Bekir
- Osman Alyanak - Dervis Aga

== Restoration ==
The film was restored in 2011 by the World Cinema Foundation at Cineteca di Bologna/L'Immagine Ritrovata Laboratory. Unfortunately only one copy of the film survived the 1980 Turkish coup d'état, and all other copies were seized and destroyed. The one remaining copy was badly scratched filled with mid-frame slices, is missing a few frames, and has suffered deterioration due to it being on colour stock film while the film is in black and white. Due to these problems the end result is not a beautifully restored print and the sound fades and even cuts at times, yet the movie and story still work as do the film's continuity and dialogue.

== Impact ==
Law of the Border was the beginning of "New Cinema" in Turkey; it was realistic, and focused on social and economic problems and was a 180 turn from the non-realistic movies made in Turkey before it. While not to be placed in the Euro western or Spaghetti Western categories, the film is along the lines of a western picture.
