= Shahrzad Mirgholikhan =

Iranian whistleblower (born 1977)

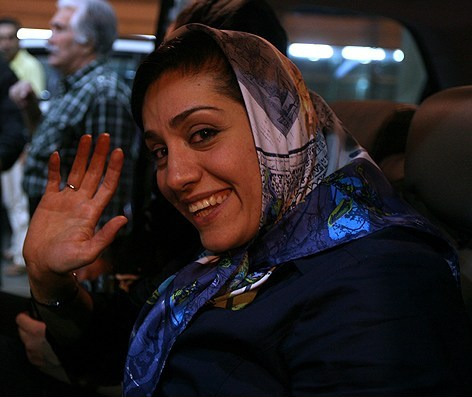
- Mirgholikhan after her release on 3 August 2012
- Born: 6 December 1977 (age 48); Tehran, Iran
- Other name: Farideh Fahimi
- Employer: Islamic Republic of Iran Broadcasting (2012–2016)
- Spouse: Reza N. (m. 1996; div. 1999) Mahmoud Seif (m. 2000; div. 2002) (m. 2003; div. 2007)
- Children: 2
- Convictions: 22 U.S.C. § 2778 – Brokering an arms deal, attempting to export the military devices

Details
- Country: Austria; United States
- Date apprehended: 2004; 2007–2012
- Imprisoned at: Federal Detention Center, Miami

Shahrzad Mirgholikhan (Persian: شهرزاد میرقلی‌خان) is an Iranian whistleblower.

The United States District Court for the Southern District of Florida convicted her of attempting to import night-vision goggles to Iran, that led to her imprisonment in the United States from 2007 to 2012. Following her release, Mirgholikhan returned to Iran and was appointed to work at Iran's state television. In 2016, she left Iran after being charged with espionage by the Intelligence Organization of the Islamic Revolutionary Guard Corps.

== Early life and education ==
She was born to a wealthy family and was brought up as a practicing Muslim. Her mother, Belghis Rovshan was a professor of linguistics and her father, Ghassem Mirgholikhan was an engineer. Mirgholikhan met her first husband in the mid-1990s and after marriage gave birth to twin daughters, Melika and Melina. She divorced from her husband because he became a drug addict. In 2000, she married Mahmoud Seif, two weeks after they met in a restaurant. The couple separated in 2002, but were reunited again in 2003. During the separation, Mirgholikhan was also briefly married to another man through a sham marriage to obtain permission papers to leave Iran.

Mirgholikhan has studied at a university in Dubai in the early 2000s, obtaining an MBA degree.

== IRIB career ==
Following her release from the U.S. prison, she returned to Iran and was employed at the Islamic Republic of Iran Broadcasting (IRIB), as the director of international relations at Press TV under Mohammad Sarafraz, then-head of the channel. In 2014, when Sarafraz was promoted as the general-director of IRIB, Mirgholikhan became the 'special inspector' of IRIB. According to Al-Monitor, she "poked around everywhere and into everything to stop waste and corruption", and clashed with Abdulali Ali-Asgari, who was IRIB's deputy-director for technical affairs at the time.

== Exile ==
Since 2016, she resides in Oman.

== Bibliography ==
- Shahrzad Mirgholikhan (2015), Bianca Rahimi (ed.), Shahrzad: A True Story, H&S Media, ISBN 9781780834740
