= Can Yoldaşları =

- Directed by: Halit Refiğ
- Starring: Mehmet Ali Akpinar; Suzan Avci; Nilüfer Aydan
- Release date: 1966
- Country: Turkey
- Language: Turkish

Can Yoldaşları is a 1966 Turkish drama film, directed by Halit Refiğ and starring Mehmet Ali Akpinar, Suzan Avci and Nilüfer Aydan.
