= Göksel Arsoy =

Turkish actor (1936–2026)

- Born: 15 March 1936; Kayseri, Turkey
- Died: 5 October 2026 (aged 90); Istanbul, Turkey
- Years active: 1957–2006

Göksel Arsoy (15 March 1936 – 5 October 2026) was a Turkish actor, singer and sportsman.

== Life and career ==
Arsoy studied at Istanbul University's Economics faculty. He was musician Yesari Asım Ersoy's nephew. He started working at the nearby Yeşilköy Airport. In 1958, he made his film debut in Kara Günlerim directed by Sırrı Gültekin and went on to appear in films such as Kelepçe and Samanyolu. In many of these, he starred opposite actress Belgin Doruk. He played as actor and producer in the cult film "Şafak Bekçileri" about the air force.

He was labelled the "Golden Child" ("Altın Çocuk") of Turkish cinema by the media. Through the years, he maintained a close friendship with Ayhan Işık, his main acting rival at the time. His singing and sports career caused him to take a break from his cinema career.

Arsoy died n Istanbul on 5 October 2026, at the age of 90. Two days later, he was buried at Zincirlikuyu Cemetery in Istanbul.

== Filmography ==
- Unutulmayanlar – 2006
- Asla Unutma – 2005
- Mirasyediler – 1995
- Dost Bildiklerim – 1978
- Sürtük – 1970
- Altın Avcıları – 1968
- Yayla Kızı Yıldız – 1967
- Ortaşark Yanıyor – 1967
- Son Kurban – 1967
- Altın Çocuk Beyrut'ta – 1967
- Kenarın Dilberi – 1966
- Altın Çocuk – 1966
- İsyancılar – 1965
- Yıldızların Altında – 1965
- Son Darbe – 1965
- Kırk Küçük Anne – 1964
- Yılların Ardından – 1964
- Evcilik Oyunu – 1964
- Kızgın Delikanlı – 1964
- Kezban – 1963
- Makber – 1963
- Şafak Bekçileri – 1963
- Genç Kızların Sevgilisi – 1963
- Kahpe – 1963
- Leyla İle Mecnun Gibi – 1963
- Cicican – 1963
- Beyaz Güvercin – 1963
- Bulunmaz Uşak – 1963
- Aşka Karşı Gelinmez – 1962
- Öldüren Bahar – 1962
- Yalnızlar İçin – 1962
- Aşk Merdiveni – 1962
- Esir Kuş – 1962
- Ne Şeker Şey – 1962
- Gençlik Hülyaları – 1962
- Billur Köşk – 1962
- Kiralık Koca – 1962
- Gönül Avcısı – 1962
- Gümüş Gerdanlık – 1962
- Küçük Beyefendi – 1962
- Akasyalar Açarken – 1962
- Şehirdeki Yabancı – 1962
- Biz de Arkadaş mıyız? – 1962
- Aşkın Saati Gelince – 1961
- Bir Demet Yasemen – 1961
- Bir Yaz Yağmuru – 1961
- Bülbül Yuvası – 1961
- Yaban Gülü – 1961
- Seni Kaybedersem – 1961
- Yavru Kuş – 1961
- Bir Bahar Akşamı – 1961
- Boş Yuva – 1961
- İki Aşk Arasında – 1961
- Kızıl Vazo – 1961
- Melekler Şahidimdir – 1961
- Zavallı Necdet – 1961
- Unutamadığım Kadın – 1961
- Güneş Doğmasın – 1961
- Bir Yaz Yağmuru – 1960
- Nilüfer Orman Çiçeği – 1960
- Satın Alınan Adam – 1960
- Taş Bebek – 1960
- Aşk Rüzgarı – 1960
- Ömrüm Böyle Geçti – 1959
- Samanyolu – 1959
- Kelepçe – 1958
- Ham Meyva – 1957
- Kara Günlerim / Yaşayan Ölüler – 1957
