= Kezban =

1953 film

- Directed by: Hicri Akbasli
- Written by: Hicri Akbasli
- Produced by: Hasan Tual
- Cinematography: Ali Yaver
- Production company: Tual Film
- Release date: 1953
- Country: Turkey
- Language: Turkish

Kezban is a 1953 Turkish romance film directed by Hicri Akbasli and starring Bülent Oran, Gönül Bayhan and Muzaffer Nebioglu.

== Cast ==
- Bülent Oran
- Gönül Bayhan
- Muzaffer Nebioglu
- Muhterem Nur
- Cahit Irgat
- Ayten Çakar
