= Sultan Gelin =

- Directed by: Halit Refiğ
- Starring: Türkan Soray; Ali Özoğuz; Handan Adalı
- Release date: 1973
- Country: Turkey
- Language: Turkish

Sultan Gelin is a 1973 Turkish drama film, directed by Halit Refiğ and starring Türkan Soray, Ali Özoğuz, and Handan Adalı.
