= Dokuzuncu Hariciye Koğuşu =

- Directed by: Nejat Saydam
- Written by: Peyami Safa
- Produced by: Nejat Saydam
- Starring: Kartal Tibet; Hülya Koçyiğit
- Cinematography: Melih Sertesen
- Distributed by: Acar Film
- Release date: 1967
- Country: Turkey
- Language: Turkish

Dokuzuncu Hariciye Koğuşu (English: Ninth External Ward) is a 1967 Turkish romantic drama film directed by Nejat Saydam based on a novel by Peyami Safa. The film stars Kartal Tibet and Hülya Koçyiğit.

== Cast ==
- Kartal Tibet ...Burhan
- Hülya Koçyiğit ...Nüzhet
- Muzaffer Tema
- Tunç Oral
- Aliye Rona
- Müserref Çapin
- Ibrahim Delideniz
- Ufuk Enünlü
- Renan Fosforoğlu
- Asim Nipton
- Yavuz Selekman
- Tuncay Toron
- Ismail Varol
- Lamia Yal
- Necabettin Yal
