= Leyla Sayar =

- Born: December 27, 1939; Istanbul, Turkey
- Died: July 22, 2016 (aged 76)
- Occupation: Actress
- Years active: 1957–1976

Leylâ Sayar (December 27, 1939 – July 22, 2016) was a Turkish actress, author, ballerina, beauty queen, and singer of Circassian and Macedonian Turkish descent. Sayar was considered to be one of the most beautiful women of the Cinema of Turkey.

== Early life and career ==
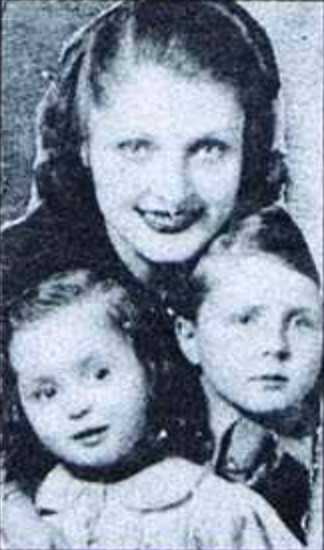
Sayar's mother Handan Hanım and brother İbrahim

Sayar was born in 1939 to Circassian mother and Macedonian Turkish father from İstanbul. Before pursuing an acting career, she attended the American Academy for Girls. In 1957, she was crowned Miss Cinema Star. Leyla Sayar briefly held the first runner-up title for the beauty pageant Miss Turkey. She also finished first in the Miss Beach Beauty competition.

She took acting lessons at the Turkish State Theatre in Ankara. Between 1957 and 1976, she has acted in 170 films. Her aunt was married to a business magnate from the United States, and this contact led Leyla Sayar to get offers abroad. However, she steadfastly refused calls from Hollywood.

In the late 1950s, despite rumors that Leyla Sayar and Muzaffer Tema would be married were circulated, she dated Göksel Arsoy briefly after her breakup with Tema.

In 1976, Sayar renounced her career and devoted herself to religion and charity. From then on, she has not used any electronic appliances or devices.

Leyla Sayar released various books, including Altın Kalem, Erdemin Sırları, Meleğin Sözleri, Mühür, and Mürşit.

== Publications ==
=== Books ===
- Altın Kalem
- Erdemin Sırları
- Meleğin Sözleri (2002)
- Mühür
- Mürşit

== Selected filmography ==
=== Film ===
Year	Film	Role	Notes
1957	Üç Garipler		Leading role
1958	Dertli Irmak		Leading role
1958	Duvaklı Göl		Leading role
1959	Bizim Mahalle		Leading role
1959	Kaderim Böyle İmiş		Leading role
1959	Ninno		Leading role
1959	Üç Kızın Hikâyesi		Leading role
1960	Aslan Yavrusu		Leading role
1960	Aşk Hırsızı		Leading role
1960	Aşk Rüzgârı		Leading role
1960	Ayşecik		Leading role
1960	Can Mustafa		Leading role
1960	Devlerin Öfkesi		Leading role
1960	Ölüm Perdesi		Leading role
1960	Yangın Var	Müjgan	Leading role
1961	Ayrı Dünya		Leading role
1961	Boş Yuva		Leading role
1961	Çapkınlar		Leading role
1961	Gönülden Gönüle		Leading role
1961	İki Yetime		Leading role
1961	Kara Dut		Leading role
1961	Şeytanın Kılıcı	Melike	Leading role
1961	Vahşi Kedi		Leading role
1961	Yaban Gülü		Leading role
1961	Yabancı Adam		Leading role
1962	Aşk Güzeldir		Leading role
1962	Aşka Kinim Var		Leading role
1962	Bir Çiçek Üç Böcek		Leading role
1962	Çifte Nikâh		Leading role
1962	Dilberler Yuvası		Leading role
1962	Geçti Buranın Pazarı		Leading role
1962	Gümüş Gerdanlık		Leading role
1962	İki Çalgıcının Seyahati		Leading role
1962	Kadın ve Tabanca		Leading role
1962	Leyla	Leyla	Leading role
1962	Öldüren Bahar		Leading role
1962	Şoförün Karısı		Leading role
1962	Ver Elini İstanbul		Leading role
1963	Aşk Hırsızı		Leading role
1963	Büyük Yemin		Leading role
1963	Çapkın Hırsız		Leading role
1963	Çapraz Delikanlı		Leading role
1963	Dişi Örümcek		Leading role
1963	Kavgasız Yaşayalım		Leading role
1963	Kezban		Leading role
1963	Leylâ ile Mecnun Gibi		Leading role
1963	Makber		Leading role
1963	Öldür Beni		Leading role
1963	Sabah Olmasın		Leading role
1963	Şafak Bekçileri	Zeynep	Leading role
1963	Yakılacak Kitap	Leyla	Leading role
1963	Zehir Hafiye		Leading role
1964	Ankara'ya Üç Bilet		Leading role
1964	Love and Grudge	Nevin	Leading role
1964	Baba Hasreti		Leading role
1964	Beş Şeker Kız		Leading role
1964	Suçlular Aramızda	Nükhet	Leading role
1964	Şehrazat	Şehrazat	Leading role
1964	Ve Allah Gençleri Yarattı		Leading role
1965	Aman Dünya Ne Dar İmiş		Leading role
1965	Ateş Gibi Kadın		Leading role
1965	Şeytanın Kurbanları		Leading role
1970	Ankara Express	Irma	Leading role
