= Gençlik Hülyaları =

- Directed by: Halit Refiğ
- Starring: Kenan Pars, Reha Yurdakul, and Erol Tas
- Release date: 1962
- Country: Turkey
- Language: Turkish

Gençlik Hülyaları is a 1962 Turkish drama film, directed by Halit Refiğ and starring Kenan Pars, Reha Yurdakul, and Erol Tas.
