= Perihan Savaş =

Turkish actress (born 1957)

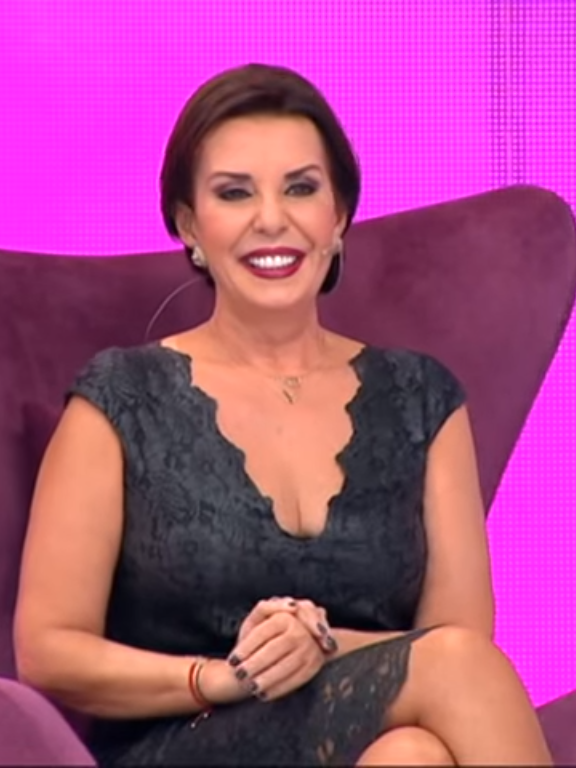
- Savaş at İşte Benim Stilim, January 2016
- Born: Şerife Perihan; 14 June 1957 (age 69); Istanbul, Turkey
- Occupations: Actress, TV presenter
- Years active: 1971–present
- Spouses: İbrahim Tatlıses (m. 1979; div. 1982) Yılmaz Zafer (m. 1987; died 1995)
- Children: 2

Şerife Perihan (born 14 June 1957), better known as Perihan Savaş, is a Turkish actress.

== Personal life ==
Savaş was born in Aksaray, Fatih. After finishing secondary school, she stopped her education. Her family is originally from Sürmene. After the age of five, she had her first acting experience by joining the Istanbul City Theatre and took part in children's play. At the age of thirteen, she got engaged to a twenty one year-old military school student. After a marriage that lasted for 6-7 months, the couple got divorced. On her childhood and her decision to become an actress, Savaş said:

My mother was a very conservative woman. For example, she would not wear thin socks, make-up, and let me trim my eyebrows. When I was offered such a thing, I said [to myself], 'Now I will wear thin socks, put on make up, and go out with my friends.'

She then married İbrahim Tatlıses and Yılmaz Zafer, respectively. She has two children, one from each of those marriages.

== Career ==
Until 1970, she worked on stage, taking part in plays such as Küçük Prenses, Romeo and Juliet, and Kibarlık Budalası. Savaş made her cinematic debut in 1971 with a role in the movie Şehzade Simbad Kaf Dağında. Soon she was cast in leading roles in a number of different movies. With Kemal Sunal, she played in comedy films "Sosyete Şaban", "Keriz". Throughout her career she has appeared in more than 120 films. Aside from her career as an actress, she also worked as a singer and TV presenter.

== Filmography ==
=== TV series ===
- Sahtekarlar - 2025-2026 (Hüma)
- Kimler Geldi, Kimler Geçti - 2024
- Mehmed: Fetihler Sultanı - 2024 (Selçuk Hatun)
- Dilek Taşı - 2023–2024 (Macide Rona)
- Deneme Çekimi - 2023
- Kapı - 2023
- İyilik - 2022–2023 (Şahika Arkun)
- Elkızı - 2021–2022 (Cavidan Bozdağlı)
- Menajerimi Ara - 2021 (herself - guest appearance)
- Çukur - 2017–2021 (Sultan Koçovalı)
- Girdap - 2016
- Bedel - 2015
- Osmanlı'da Derin Devlet - 2013
- Sırat - 2011
- Leyla ile Mecnun - 2011
- Gazi - 2008
- Kırmızı Işık - 2008
- Eksik Etek - 2007
- Yaprak Dökümü - 2006
- Şarkılar Susmasın - 2006
- Yanık Koza - 2005
- Gece Yürüyüşü - 2004
- Fırtına Hayatlar - 2004
- Harput Güneşi - 2004
- Kendini Bırak Gitsin - 2004
- Büyük Buluşma - 2004
- Umutların Ötesi - 2003
- Kardelen - 2002
- Yalanın Batsın - 2002
- Sultan - 2001
- Karakolda Ayna Var - 2000
- Kimyacı - 2000
- Ana Kuzusu - 1996
- Sevda Kondu - 1996
- Yarına Gülümsemek - 1991
- El Kızı - 1989

=== Film ===
- Sen Büyümeye Bak - 2024
- Season of Love - 2024
- Gerçek Kesit: Manyak - 2018
- Kafalar Karışık - 2018
- Gulyabani - 2014
- Zaman Makinesi - 2014
- Dursun Çavuş - 2013
- Hop Dedik: Deli Dumrul - 2011
- Takım: Vatan Sana Canım Feda - 2011
- İstiklal: Söğütlü Hacer Ana - 2007
- Eve Dönüş - 2006
- Kameranın Ardındaki Kadın: Bilge Olgaç - 2005
- Çalınan Ceset - 2004
- Evlat - 2003
- Gelinlik Kız - 2000
- Savunma - 2000
- Köpekler Adası - 1996
- Gökkuşağı - 1995
- Sevdaların Ölümü - 1992
- Mahallenin Muhtarları - 1992
- Acılar Ve Arzular - 1991
- Kiralık Anne - 1990
- Oy Bebek - 1990
- Minyeli Abdullah 2 - 1990
- Zulüm Treni - 1989
- Bekleyiş - 1989
- Karılar Koğuşu - 1989
- Minyeli Abdullah - 1989
- Yaşarken Ölmek - 1988
- Arka Evin İnsanları - 1988
- Sapık Kadın - 1988
- Cennet Gözlüm - 1987
- Arkadaşım ve Ben - 1987
- Sis - 1987
- Toprağın Gelini - 1987
- Yarınsız Adam - 1987
- İpekçe - 1987
- Sevgi Dünyası - 1987
- Su - 1986
- Aşk ve Kin - 1986
- Hastahane - 1986
- Bir Daha Umut - 1986
- Kırlangıç Fırtınası - 1985
- Alkol - 1985
- Sosyete Şaban - 1985
- Keriz - 1985
- Güneş Doğarken - 1984
- Kaşık Düşmanı - 1984
- Yalan - 1982
- Amansızlar - 1982
- Seni Yakacaklar - 1981
- Ayrılık Kolay Değil - 1980
- Yarabbim - 1980
- Çile - 1980
- Vah Başımıza Gelenler - 1979
- Fırat - 1979
- Kara Çadırın Kızı - 1979
- Kara Yazma - 1979
- Yuvasız Kuşlar - 1979
- Köşe Kapmaca - 1979
- Ölüm Görevi - 1978
- Çilekeş - 1978
- Lekeli Melek - 1978
- Yıkılış - 1978
- Kılıç Bey - 1978
- Şeref Sözü - 1977
- Sevgili Oğlum - 1977
- Silah Arkadaşları - 1977
- Satılmış Adam - 1977
- İki Kızgın Adam - 1976
- Silahlara Veda - 1976
- Perişan - 1976
- Sevdalılar - 1976
- Analar Ölmez - 1976
- Deli Kız - 1975
- İntihar - 1975
- Bitirimler Sınıfı - 1975
- Kader Yolcuları - 1975
- Beş Milyoncuk Borç Verir misin - 1975
- Çapkın Kızlar - 1975
- Hostes - 1974
- Esir Hayat - 1974
- Sevmek - 1974
- Dertler Benim Olsun - 1974
- Taşralı Kız - 1974
- Gerçek - 1974
- Çılgın Arzular - 1974
- Evet mi Hayır mı - 1974
- Sensiz Yaşanmaz - 1974
- Zafer Kartalları - 1974
- Sezercik Küçük Mücahit - 1974
- Bedrana - 1974
- Gülerken Ağlayanlar - 1973
- Çaresizler - 1973
- Kızın Varsa Derdin Var - 1973
- Kuşçu - 1973
- Nefret - 1973
- Soğukkanlılar - 1973
- Yemin - 1973
- Yedi Evlat İki Damat - 1973
- Bebek Yüzlü - 1973
- Namus - 1972
- Malkoçoğlu Kurt Bey - 1972
- Sev Dedi Gözlerim - 1972
- Vur - 1972
- Korkusuz Beşler - 1972
- Aşka Selam Kavgaya Devam - 1972
- Atmaca Mehmet - 1972
- İyi Döverim Kötü Severim - 1972
- Katerina 72 - 1972
- Serseri Kral - 1972
- Para - 1972
- Kanlı Değirmen - 1972
- Şehzade Sinbad Kaf Dağında - 1971

=== TV programs ===
- 1993 - Gerçek Kesit
- 2012 - Çay ve Sempati
- 2013 - Sağlıcakla
- 2015 - Perihan'la Sağlıklı Ramazanlar

== Theatre ==
- Kanlı Nigar: Sadık Şendil - Adım Theatre, (2012)
- Yüzleşme: Arslan Kaçar - Istanbul City Theatre, (2011)
- Bozuk Düzen: Dinçer Sümer - Istanbul City Theatre, (2009)
- How the Other Half Loves: Alan Ayckbourn - Istanbul City Theatre, (2005)
- Yedi Kocalı Hürmüz: Sadık Şendil - Istanbul City Theatre, (2003)
- Huit femmes: Robert Thomas - Istanbul City Theatre - (2002)
- Bir Kış Öyküsü: Cevat Fehmi Başkut - Istanbul City Theatre - (2000)
- Cyrano de Bergerac: Edmond Rostand - Istanbul City Theatre - (1967)
- Kadın

== Awards ==
- 1974: 11th Antalya Film Festival, Best Actress, Bedrana.
