= Lütfi Ömer Akad =

Turkish film director

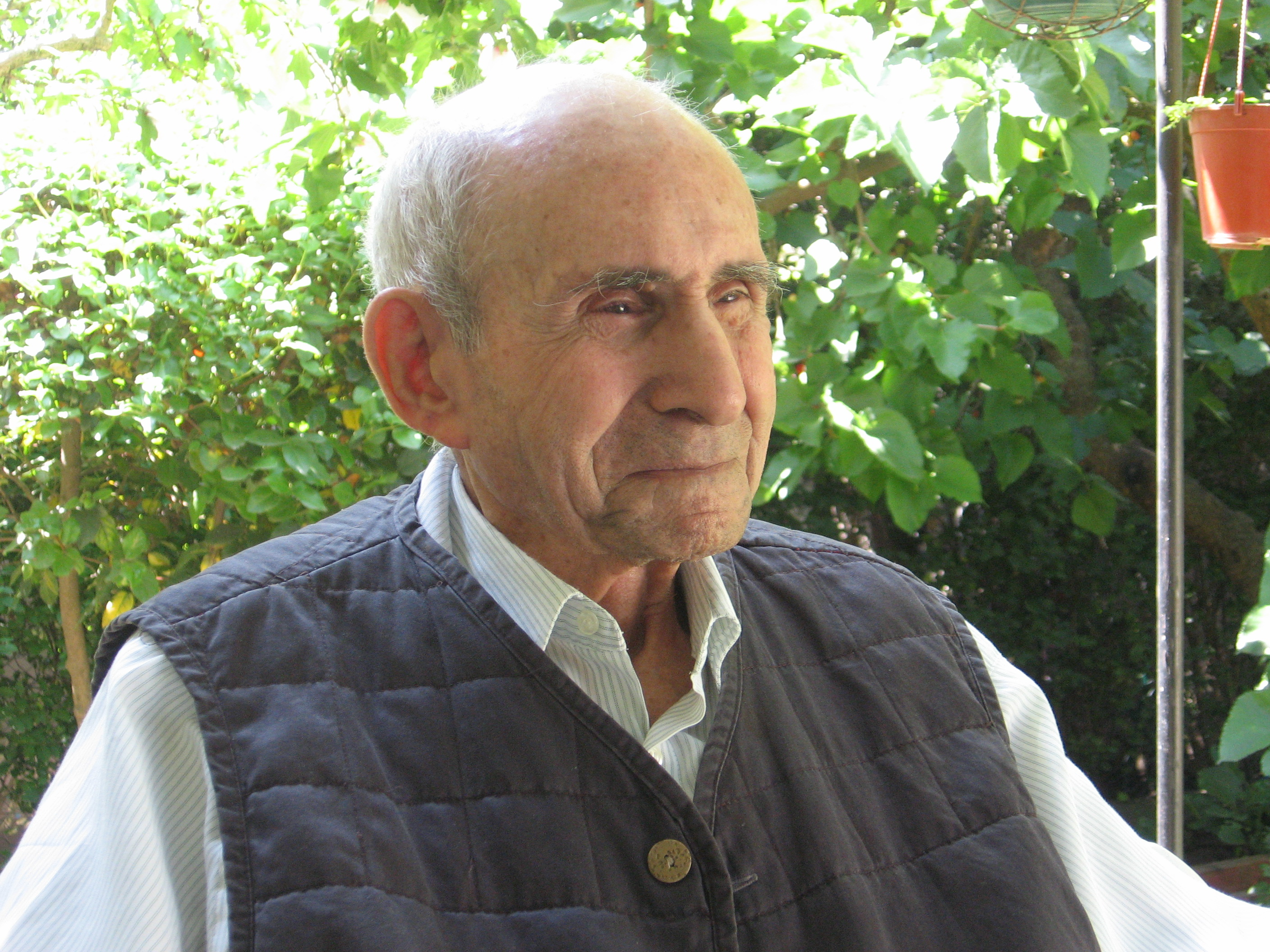
- Born: Mehmet Lütfi Akad; 2 September 1916; Istanbul, Ottoman Empire
- Died: 19 November 2011 (aged 95); Istanbul, Turkey
- Education: Galatasaray High School, Istanbul Economy and Commerce Higher School
- Occupations: Film director; screenwriter; academic
- Years active: 1932-2011
- Awards: Golden Orange Award for Best Director (1974); Golden Orange Honorary Award (1983)

Lütfi Ömer Akad (2 September 1916 – 19 November 2011) was a Turkish film director, screenwriter, and academic, who directed movies from 1948 to 1990. In 1949, he debuted as a film director with Vurun Kahpeye ("Strike the Whore") an adaptation of Halide Edib Adıvar's book of the same title. He became one of the pioneers of the period in the "Director Generation". His 1970s trilogy comprising The Bride, The Wedding and The Sacrifice, is considered his masterpiece. Afterwards, he withdrew from movie making instead directing adaptations for TV.

== Biography ==
Lütfi Ömer Akad was born on September 2, 1916. Following his secondary education at French Jeanne d'Arc School and Galatasaray High School, he studied finance at Istanbul Economy and Commerce Higher School. Beside his occupation as financial advisor at Sema Film company, he wrote articles on theatre and cinema. After directing more than 100 movies, Lütfi Ömer Akad taught twenty years at the Mimar Sinan Fine Arts University.

He died on 19 November 2011 at the age of 95 in Istanbul.

== Filmography ==
- Vurun Kahpeye 1948
- Lüküs Hayat 1950
- Tahir ile Zühre 1951
- Arzu ile Kamber 1951
- Kanun Namına 1952
- İngiliz Kemal 1952
- Altı Ölü Var 1953
- Katil 1953
- Çalsın Sazlar Oynasın Kızlar 1953
- Bulgar Sadık 1954
- Vahşi Bir Kız Sevdim 1954
- Kardeş Kurşunu 1954
- Görünmeyen Adam İstanbul'da 1954
- Meçhul Kadın 1955
- Kalbimin Şarkısı 1955
- Ak altın 1956
- Kara Talih 1957
- Meyhanecinin Kızı 1957
- Zümrüt 1958
- Ana Kucağı 1958
- Yalnızlar Rıhtımı 1959
- Cilalı ibo'nun Çilesi 1959
- Yangın Var 1959
- Dişi Kurt 1960
- Sessiz Harp 1961
- Üç Tekerlekli Bisiklet 1962
- Tanrı'nın Bağışı Orman 1964
- Sırat Köprüsü 1966
- Hudutların Kanunu 1966
- Kızılırmak Karakoyun 1967
- Ana 1967
- Kurbanlık Katil 1967
- Vesikalı Yarim 1968
- Kader Böyle İstedi 1968
- Seninle Ölmek İstiyorum 1969 (color)
- Bir Teselli Ver 1971
- Mahşere Kadar 1971
- Vahşi Çiçek 1971
- Yaralı Kurt 1972
- Gökçe Çiçek 1973
- Gelin 1973
- Düğün 1974
- Diyet 1975
- Esir Hayat 1974

Awards
| Preceded by Nejat Saydam | Golden Orange Award for Best Director; 1974 for Düğün | Succeeded by Şerif Gören |
| Preceded by newly established | Golden Orange Honorary Award; 1983 | Succeeded by Sezer Sezin |
