= Halit Refiğ =

Turkish film director, film producer, screenwriter and writer

- Born: 5 March 1934; İzmir, Turkey
- Died: 11 October 2009 (aged 75); Istanbul, Turkey
- Occupations: Film director, film producer, screenwriter, writer

Halit Refiğ (5 March 1934 – 11 October 2009) was a Turkish film director, film producer, screenwriter and writer. He made around sixty films, including feature films, documentaries and TV serials. He is considered to be the pioneer of the National Cinema movement and the initiator of the production of TV serials in Turkey.

== Biography ==
Halit Refiğ graduated from Şişli Terakki High School in 1951 and studied engineering at Robert College in Istanbul.

Refiğ directed his first films in 8mm while he served as a military reserve officer in Korea, Japan and Ceylon. He wrote articles on cinema at newspapers in 1956 and published the Sinema Dergisi magazine together with Nijat Özön. He began his career as Atıf Yılmaz's assistant in 1957 together with Yılmaz Güney. He worked as scriptwriter for Atıf Yılmaz and Memduh Ün. His directorial debut was Forbidden Love (Yasak Aşk) (1961). His 1962 film Stranger in the City was entered into the 3rd Moscow International Film Festival.

In the 1970s, with the decline in Turkish cinema, he started to work extensively for TV. In 1974, he contributed as an instructor to the first cinema education programs initiated by the Istanbul State Fine Arts Academy (the Mimar Sinan Fine Arts University of today) where he started to work as lecturer in 1975. In 1975, he directed the TV series Aşk-ı Memnu (Forbidden Love) which was aired on the Turkish Radio Television, TRT. This TV serial is considered to be the first miniseries on Turkish television stations. In 1978, he wrote a script for a documentary about the life of Mimar Sinan on commission from the Mimar Sinan University. The project was not completed but the script was published.

In 1999, on commission from the then Prime Minister Bülent Ecevit, he began developing a feature film project titled Devlet Ana (Mother State), to be released on the 700th anniversary of the establishment of the Ottoman Empire. The project was going to be conducted in collaboration with the Mimar Sinan University (MSU). In 2001, Refiğ stated that he would not collaborate with MSU and thus the project was not realized.

Refiğ was one of the contributors of the conservative magazine Hareket.

== Censorship ==
Refiğ's 1979-81 adaptation of Kemal Tahir's novel, Yorgun Savaşçı, for TRT, where he served as an advisor, was banned from broadcast by TRT on account of incorporating scenes which were anti-Atatürk, anti-Turkish Independence War, and pro-Çerkes Ethem. A commission of seven people comprising three colonels, a representative of the Ministry of Interior, a representative of the press office of the Prime Minister, two TRT representatives, and Turgut Özakman, the director of the Turkish State Theatres, representing the Ministry of Culture, was formed on order from President Kenan Evren and Prime Minister Bülent Ulusu and the prints were burnt in 1983 by TRT director Macit Akman, at the furnaces of the Turkish General Staff printhouse under the supervision of the said commission. This censorship caused public controversy. A surviving copy surfaced in 1993 and the 8-episode miniseries was broadcast in its entirety on TRT.

== Academic life ==
He lectured at the University of Wisconsin in 1976, where he directed The Intercessors, and at Denison University in Ohio in 1984, where he shot In the Wilderness with his students. He was given the title of "Honorary Professor" by Marmara University in 1997.

== Death ==
He suffered from cholangiocarcinoma and died on 11 October 2009 in Istanbul, aged 75. He was interred in the Zincirlikuyu Cemetery two days later, following the funeral service held at Teşvikiye Mosque.

== Filmography as director ==
- Seviştiğimiz Günler (1961)
- Yasak Aşk (1961)
- Şehirdeki Yabancı (1962)
- Gençlik Hülyaları (1962)
- Şafak Bekçileri (1963)
- Gurbet Kuşları (1964)
- Şehrazat (1964)
- Evcilik Oyunu (1964)
- İstanbul'un Kızları (1964)
- Canım Sana Feda (1965)
- Güneşe Giden Yol (1965)
- Haremde Dört Kadın (1965)
- Kırık Hayatlar (1965)
- Erkek Ve Dişi (1966)
- Üç Korkusuz Arkadaş (1966)
- Karakolda Ayna Var (1966)
- Can Yoldaşları (1966)
- Kız Kolunda Damga Var (1967)
- Bir Türk'e Gönül Verdim (1969)
- Yaşamak Ne Güzel Şey (1969)
- Adsız Cengaver (1970)
- Sevmek Ve Ölmek Zamanı (1971)
- Ali Cengiz Oyunu (1971)
- Çöl Kartalı (1972)
- Acı Zafer (1972)
- Aşk Fırtınası (1972)
- Fatma Bacı (1972)
- Kızın Varmı Derdin Var (1973)
- Cennetin Kapısı (1973)
- Sultan Gelin (1973)
- Vurun Kahpeye (1973)
- Yedi Evlat İki Damat (1973)
- Aşk-ı Memnu (1975) (TV)
- Arabulucular (1977)
- Yaşam Kavgası (1978)
- Yorgun Savaşçı (1979) (TV)
- Leyla İle Mecnun (1982)
- O Kadın (1982)
- Beyaz Ölüm (1983)
- İhtiras Fırtınası (1983)
- Alev Alev (1984)
- Ölüm Yolu (1985)
- Paramparça (1985)
- Son Darbe (1985)
- Kıskıvrak (1986)
- Teyzem (1986)
- Yarın Ağlayacağım (1986)
- Kızımın Kanı (1987)
- Kurtar Beni (1987)
- Kızım Ve Ben (1988)
- Hanım (1988)
- Karılar Koğuşu (1989)
- İki Yabancı (1990)
- Zirvedekiler (1993) (TV)
- Köpekler Adası (1996)
- Affet Bizi Hocam (1998) (TV)
- Kerem (1999)
- Affet Beni Hocam (2000)
- Zeynep Öğretmen (2000) (TV)
- Gelinlik Kız (2000)
- Sara ile Musa (2000) (TV)
- Midasın Düşü (2000) (TV)
- Gençlik (2000)

== Producer ==
- Yaşamak Hakkımdır 1958
- İstanbul'un Kızları 1964
- Canım Sana Feda 1965
- İki Yabancı 1990

== Screenwriter ==
- Yaşamak Hakkımdır 1958
- Ala Geyik 1959
- Karacaoğlan'ın Kara Sevdası 1959
- Suçlu 1960
- Mahallenin Sevgilisi 1960
- Ölüm Peşimizde 1960
- Kırık Çanaklar 1960
- Avare Mustafa 1961
- Seviştiğimiz Günler 1961
- Yasak Aşk 1961
- Güneş Doğmasın 1961
- Şafak Bekçileri 1963
- Yavaş Gel Güzelim 1963
- İstanbul'un Kızları 1964
- Şehrazat 1964
- Gurbet Kuşları 1964
- Güneşe Giden Yol 1965
- Kırık Hayatlar 1965
- Haremde Dört Kadın 1965
- Yasak Sokaklar 1965
- Karakolda Ayna Var 1966
- Aslan Pençesi 1966
- Can Yoldaşları 1966
- Üç Korkusuz Arkadaş 1966
- Erkek Ve Dişi 1966
- Kanlı Hayat 1967
- Kız Kolunda Damga Var 1967
- Aslan Yürekli Kabadayı 1967
- Yaprak Dökümü 1967
- Son Gece 1967
- Bir Türk'e Gönül Verdim 1969
- Yaşamak Ne Güzel Şey 1969
- Atsız Cengaver 1970
- Ali Cengiz Oyunu 1971
- Acı Zafer 1972
- Aşk Fırtınası 1972
- Çöl Kartalı 1972
- Sultan Gelin 1973
- Aşk-ı Memnu 1975
- Yaşam Kavgası 1978
- Son Darbe (2) 1985
- Kurtar Beni 1987
- Arkadaşım Şeytan 1988
- Hanım 1988
- Karılar Koğuşu 1989
- İki Yabancı 1990
- Köpekler Adası 1996
- Kerem 1999
- Cumbadan Rumbaya 2005

== Bibliography ==
=== Published screenplays ===
- Refiğ, Halit. (2009). Puşkin Erzurumda. Dergah Yayınları, Sinema İletişim Dizisi, İstanbul. ISBN 978-975-995-176-4
- Refiğ, Halit. (2009). Koca Sinan. Dergah Yayınları, Sinema İletişim Dizisi, İstanbul. ISBN 978-975-995-175-7
- Refiğ, Halit. (2009). Şeytan Aldatması. Alfa Basım Yayım Dağıtım, Senaryo Dizisi, İstanbul. ISBN 978-605-106-114-6
- Refiğ, Halit. (2009). Gazi ile Latife: Mustafa Kemal'in Yaşamından Bir Kesit. Alfa Basım Yayım Dağıtım, Senaryo Dizisi, İstanbul. ISBN 978-605-106-032-3
- Refiğ, Halit. (2006). Aşk ve Ölüm Senaryoları. Doğan Kitapçılık, İstanbul. ISBN 978-975-293-450-4

=== Non-fiction (memoirs, essays) ===
- Refiğ, Halit; eds. Gültekin, D. Ali; Zileli, Irmak. (2009). Doğruyu Aradım Güzeli Sevdim. Bizim Kitaplar Yayınevi, İstanbul. ISBN 978-9944-1-5966-1
- Refiğ, Halit; ed. Gültekin, D. Ali. (2007). Tek Umut Türkiye. Bizim Kitaplar Yayınevi, İstanbul. ISBN 978-9944-1-5916-6
- Refiğ, Halit & Hristidis, Şengün Kılıç. (2007). Sinemada Ulusal Tavır. Türkiye İş Bankası Kültür Yayınları, İstanbul. ISBN 978-9944-88-064-0
- Refiğ, Halit. (2002). Doğu Batı ve Türkiye 10 Yılda Nereden Başladık? Nereye Geldik?. Ufuk Kitapları, İstanbul. ISBN 978-975-6571-18-7
- Refiğ, Halit. (2000). Gerçeğin Değişkenliği Kemal Tahir. Ufuk Kitapları, İstanbul. ISBN 978-975-6714-04-1

=== Further reading ===
- Maraşlı, Gülşah Nezaket. (2007). Bir Halit Refiğ Filmi. Elips Kitap, İstanbul. ISBN 978-975-8971-00-8
- Adiloğlu, Fatoş. (2006). Sinemada Mimari Açılımlar: Halit Refiğ Filmleri. Es Yayınları, İstanbul. ISBN 978-975-8716-40-1
- Türk, İbrahim. (2001). Halit Refiğ Düşlerden Düşüncelere Söyleşiler. Kabalcı Yayınları, İstanbul. ISBN 975-8240-41-2

Awards
Preceded by established	Golden Orange Award for Best Director; 1964 for Gurbet Kuşları	Succeeded by Atıf Yılmaz
Preceded by Ömer Kavur	Golden Orange Award for Best Director; 1989 for Hanım	Succeeded by Halit Refiğ
Preceded by Halit Refiğ	Golden Orange Award for Best Director; 1990 for Karılar Koğuşu	Succeeded by Yavuz Özkan
