= Selda Alkor =

Turkish actress

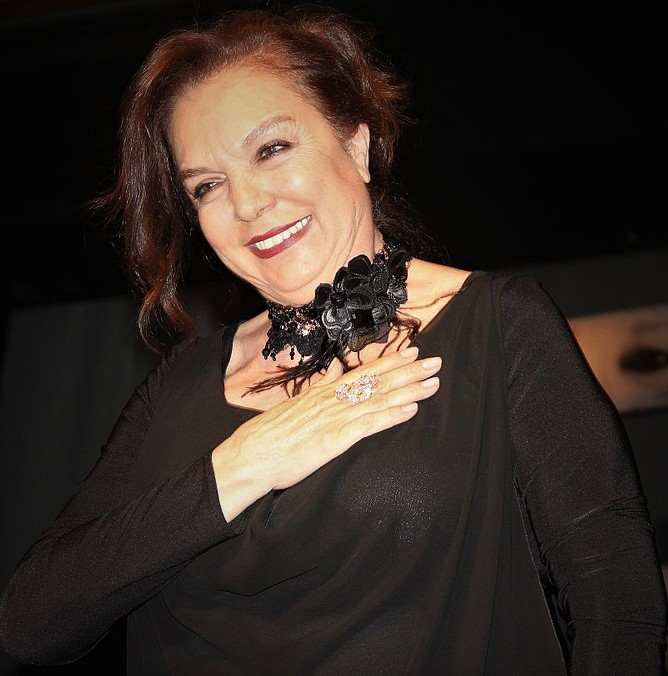
- Alkor at the Flying Broom International Women's Film Festival, May 2016
- Born: January 3, 1943 (age 83); Konya, Turkey
- Occupations: Actress, singer
- Years active: 1957–present
- Notable work: Asmalı Konak
- Spouse: Cihat İlkbaşaran (m. 1972)

Selda Alkor (born January 3, 1943) is a Turkish actress, beauty pageant titleholder, painter, and singer of Circassian and Georgian descent. She received a Golden Orange in 2002. Her acting skills and European features made her one of the most in-demand Turkish actresses in the early 1970s. With marked Circassian characteristics, Alkor was famous for her tall height, natural blonde hair, fair skin, and light green eyes. Due to her portrayal of Sümbül Karadağ on the primetime ATV series Asmalı Konak, she was nicknamed "Hanım Ağa", old Turkish for matriarch. Alkor served as presidents of various foundations, including TÜRKSAV and SODER.

== Early life and career ==
Alkor was born in 1943 to Muharrem and Meliha Alkor. An ethnic Circassian, her father was a well-known police commissioner and author in Turkey. Her mother was a housewife whose mother was of Georgian origin. Selda Alkor's resemblance to her paternal grandfather, Çerkez Sarı Mehmet (Turkish: Mehmet the Circassian Blond), was remarkable. She spent a vast majority of her childhood in Manisa. Alkor attended high schools for girls both in İzmir and Manisa. Later, she graduated from the Art Institute. In 1965, she finished first in a beauty competition organized by the Ses magazine and held the title Miss Cinema Star. Alkor also released several LP records.

== Discography ==
=== LPs ===
- "Bay Fakir"
- "Yarın Yeni Bir Gün Olacak"

=== Singles ===
- "Duydum ki Unutmuşsun"
- "Senede Bir Gün"
- "Şaka Yaptım Anlasana" (1970)

== Filmography ==
=== Film ===
Year	Film	Role	Notes
1965	Cumartesi Senin Pazar Benim		Leading role
1965	Ava Giden Avlanır		Leading role
1965	Çiçekçi Kız		Leading role
1965	Senede Bir Gün	Nazlı	Leading role
1965	Buzlar Çözülmeden		Leading role
1965	İnatçı Gelin		Leading role
1965	Güneşe Giden Yol	Handan	Leading role
1966	Kadın Avcıları		Leading role
1966	Katiller De Ağlar		Leading role
1966	Yosma Leyla		Leading role
1966	Sokak Kızı		Leading role
1966	Yemin Ettim Bir Kere		Leading role
1966	Vatan Kurtaran Aslan		Leading role
1966	Silahlar Patlayınca		Leading role
1966	Sarı Gül		Leading role
1966	Zehirli Kucak		Leading role
1966	Kalpsiz		Leading role
1966	Geceler Yarim Oldu		Leading role
1966	Fırtına Beşler		Leading role
1966	Fakir ve Mağrur		Leading role
1966	Dişi Kartal		Leading role
1966	Konforlu Necla	Necla	Leading role
1966	İntikam Uğruna		Leading role
1966	Göklerdeki Sevgili		Leading role
1966	Ayrılık Şarkısı		Leading role
1966	Boyacı		Leading role
1966	Boğaziçi Şarkısı		Leading role
1966	Yakut Gözlü Kedi	Aylin	Leading role
1966	Altın Kollu Adam	Lale	Leading role
1966	Erkek ve Dişi		Leading role
1967	Ölünceye Kadar		Leading role
1967	Osmanlı Kabadayısı	Nazlı	Leading role
1967	Merhamet		Leading role
1967	Kaderim Ağlamak Mı?		Leading role
1967	İdam Günü		Leading role
1967	Bir Katil Sevdim		Leading role
1967	Bir Annenin Gözyaşları		Leading role
1967	Ayrılık Olmasaydı		Leading role
1967	Akşam Yıldızı		Leading role
1967	Dördü De Seviyordu		Leading role
1967	Sen Benimsin		Leading role
1967	Evlat Uğruna	Oya	Leading role
1967	Kırbaç Altında		Leading role
1967	Elveda		Leading role
1968	İftira		Leading role
1968	Leylaklar Altında		Leading role
1968	Şafak Sökmesin	Meryem	Leading role
1968	Gözyaşlarım		Leading role
1968	Baharda Solan Çiçek		Leading role
1968	İlk ve Son		Leading role
1968	Erikler Çiçek Açtı		Leading role
1969	Gelin Ayşem		Leading role
1969	Kadere Boyun Eğdiler		Leading role
1969	Bir Şarkısın Sen		Leading role
1969	Esmerin Tadı Sarışının Adı		Leading role
1969	Fakir Kızı Leyla		Leading role
1969	Yaşamak Ne Güzel Şey	Mualla May	Leading role
1970	Yiğitlerin Türküsü		Leading role
1989	Bir Kadın Bir Yaşam		Leading role
1989	Şeytanın Kurbanları		Leading role
2003	Asmalı Konak: Hayat	Sümbül Karadağ	Leading role
2010	Mahpeyker: Kösem Sultan	Kösem Sultan	Leading role
2020	Türkler Geliyor: Adaletin Kılıcı		

=== Television ===
Year	Film	Role	Notes
1983	Kartallar Yüksek Uçar	Hanım Ağa	TV mini-series
1997	Sırtımdan Vuruldum	İnci	TV mini-series
1997	Böyle Mi Olacaktı?	Süreyya	TV series
2002–2004	Asmalı Konak	Sümbül Karadağ	TV series
2004–2005	Çemberimde Gül Oya	Yurdanur Eroğlu	TV series
2005	Cumbadan Rumbaya		TV mini-series
2005	Ödünç Hayat	Saadet	TV series
2006	Rüyalarda Buluşuruz	Semiha	TV mini-series
2007	Hicran Sokağı	Handan	TV series
2007–2008	Parmaklıklar Ardında	Nur Kurteşi "Ana"	TV series
2009	Yeşilçam Denizi	Host	Documentary
2013	Tozlu Yollar		TV series
2021	Menajerimi Ara	Herself	TV series
