= Presidency of Recep Tayyip Erdoğan =

Presidential administration of Turkey since 2014

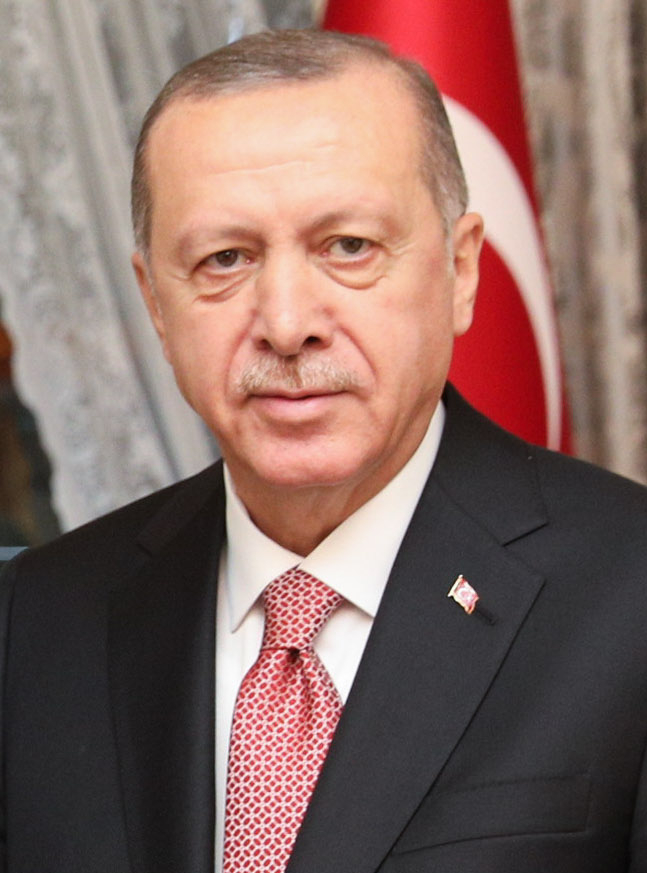
- Erdoğan in 2018
- Presidency of Recep Tayyip Erdoğan; 28 August 2014 – present
- President: Recep Tayyip Erdoğan
- Vice President: Fuat Oktay (2018-2023); Cevdet Yılmaz (2023-present)
- Premier: Ahmet Davutoğlu (2014–2016); Binali Yıldırım (2016–2018)
- Cabinet: 66th cabinet of Turkey (2018-2023); 67th cabinet of Turkey (2023-present)
- Party: Justice and Development
- Election: 2014; 2018; 2023
- Seat: Presidential Complex; Ankara
- Presidential seal

The presidency of Recep Tayyip Erdoğan began when Recep Tayyip Erdoğan took the oath of office on 28 August 2014 and became the 12th president of Turkey. He administered the new Prime Minister Ahmet Davutoğlu's oath on 29 August. When asked about his lower-than-expected 51.79% share of the vote, he allegedly responded, "there were even those who did not like the Prophet. I, however, won 52%." Assuming the role of president, Erdoğan was criticized for openly stating that he would not maintain the tradition of presidential neutrality. Erdoğan has also stated his intention to pursue a more active role as president, such as utilising the President's rarely used cabinet-calling powers. The political opposition has argued that Erdoğan will continue to pursue his own political agenda, controlling the government, while his new prime minister Ahmet Davutoğlu would be docile and submissive. Furthermore, the domination of loyal Erdoğan supporters in Davutoğlu's cabinet fuelled speculation that Erdoğan intended to exercise substantial control over the government.

== Domestic policy ==
=== Presidential palace ===
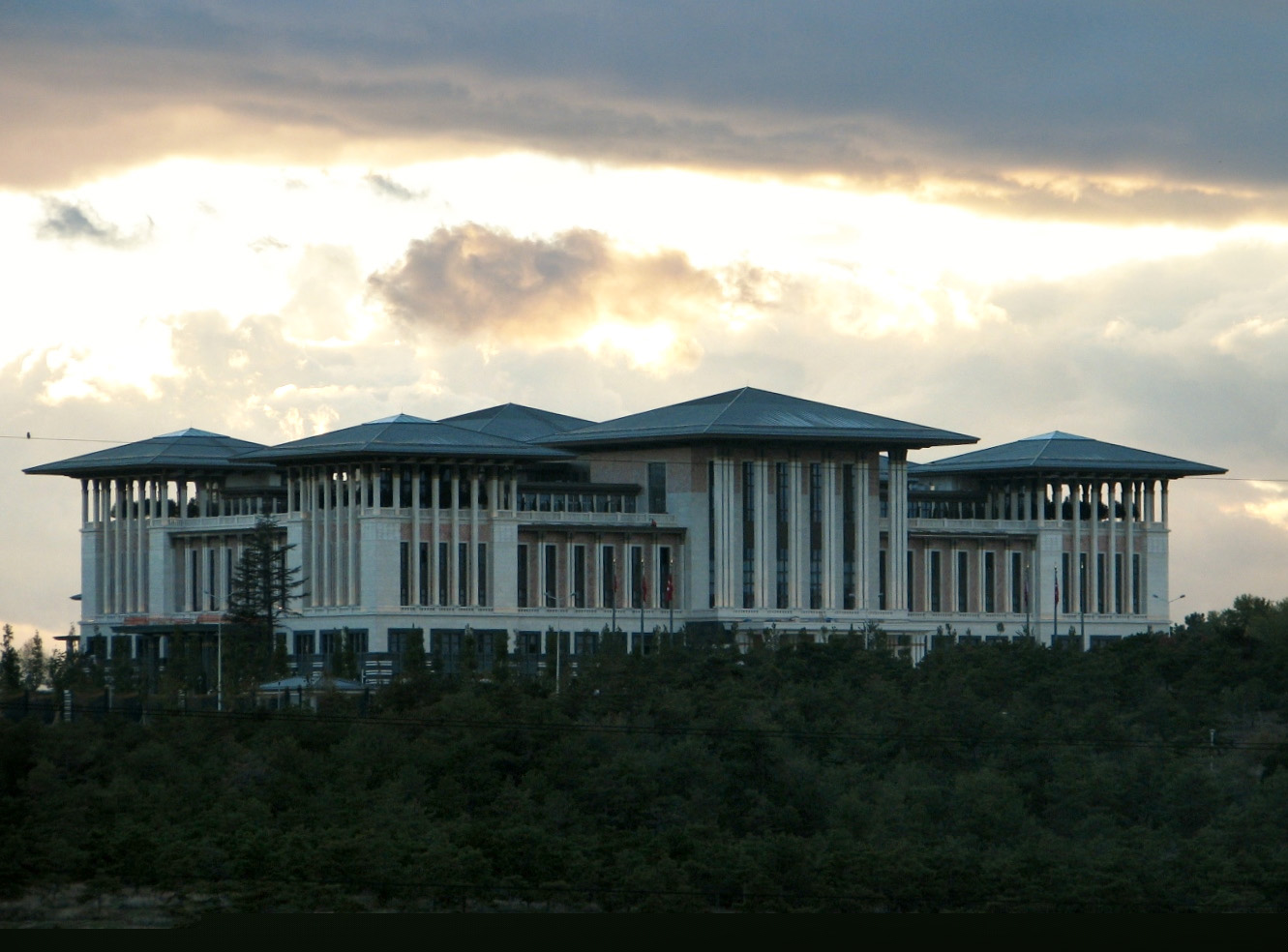
New Presidential Palace in Ankara

Erdoğan was criticised for the construction of a new palace called Ak Saray (pure white palace), which occupies approximately 50 acres of Atatürk Forest Farm (AOÇ) in Ankara. Since the AOÇ is protected land, several court orders were issued to halt the construction of the new palace, though building work went on nonetheless. The opposition described the move as a clear disregard for the rule of law. The project was subject to heavy criticism and allegations were made; of corruption during the construction process, wildlife destruction and the complete obliteration of the zoo in the AOÇ in order to make way for the new compound. The fact that the palace is technically illegal has led to it being branded as the 'Kaç-Ak Saray', the word kaçak in Turkish meaning 'illegal'.

Ak Saray was originally designed as a new office for the Prime Minister. However, upon assuming the presidency, Erdoğan announced that the palace would become the new Presidential Palace, while the Çankaya Köşkü will be used by the Prime Minister instead. The move was seen as a historic change since the Çankaya Köşkü had been used as the iconic office of the presidency ever since its inception. The Ak Saray has almost 1,000 rooms and cost $350 million (€270 million), leading to huge criticism at a time when mining accidents and workers' rights had been dominating the agenda.

On 29 October 2014, Erdoğan was due to hold a Republic Day reception in the new palace to commemorate the 91st anniversary of the Republic of Turkey and to officially inaugurate the Presidential Palace. However, after most invited participants announced that they would boycott the event and a mining accident occurred in the district of Ermenek in Karaman, the reception was cancelled.

=== 2016 coup attempt ===
On 15 July 2016, a coup d'état was attempted by the military with aims to remove Erdoğan from government. By the next day, Erdoğan's government managed to reassert effective control in the country. Reportedly, no government official was arrested or harmed, which among other factors raised the suspicion of a false flag event staged by the government itself.

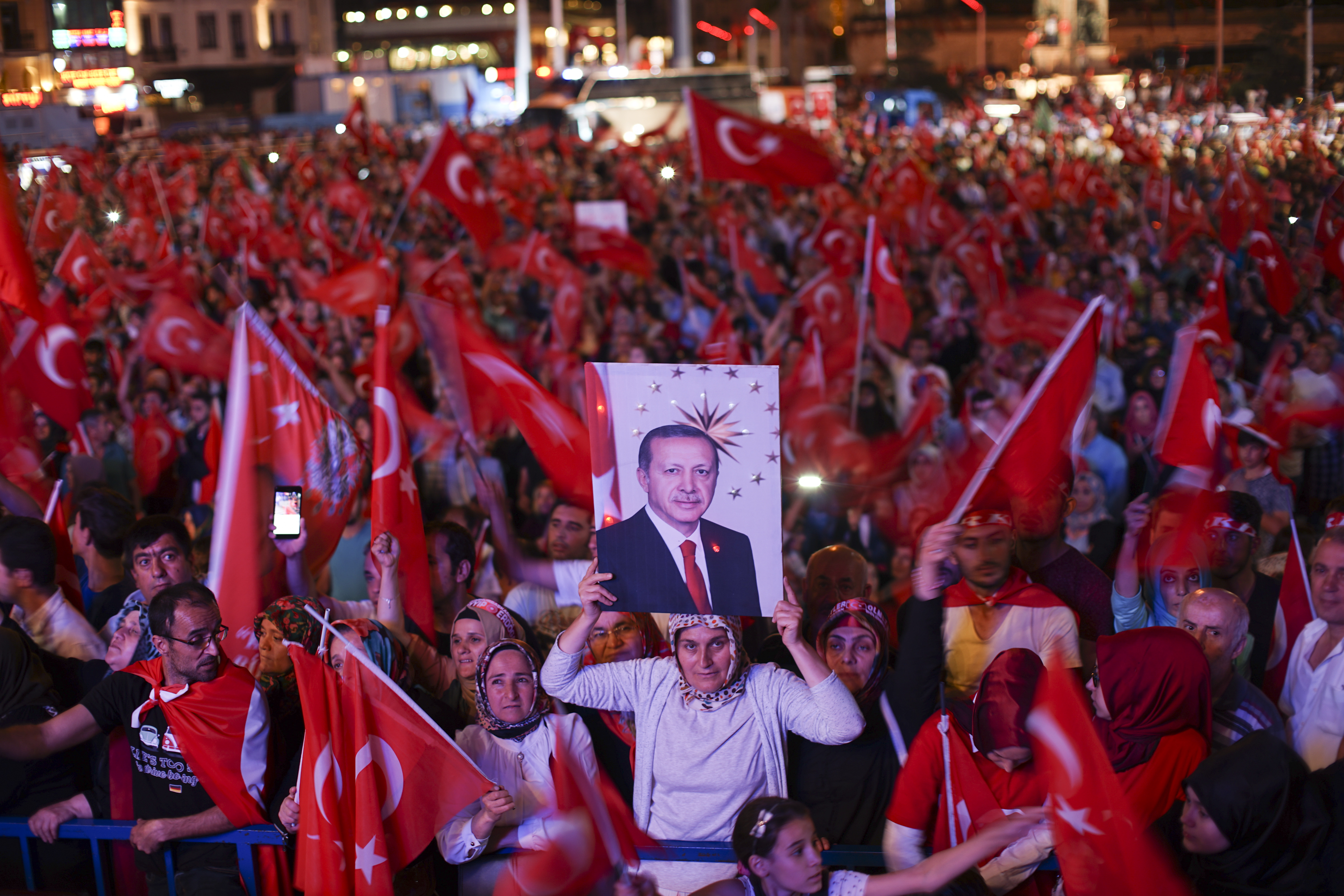
Turkish anti-coup rally in Istanbul, 22 July 2016

Erdoğan, as well as other government officials, have blamed an exiled cleric, and once an ally of Erdoğan, Fethullah Gülen, for staging the coup attempt. Suleyman Soylu, Minister for Labor in Erdoğan's government, accused the US of planning a coup to oust Erdoğan.

Erdoğan, as well as other high-ranking Turkish government officials have issued repeated demands to the US to extradite Gülen.

Following the coup attempt, there has been a significant deterioration in Turkey-US relations. European and other world leaders have expressed their concerns over the situation in Turkey, with many of them warning Erdoğan not to use the coup attempt as an excuse for crackdown against his opponents.

The rise of Islamic state and the collapse of the Kurdish peace process lead to a sharp rise in terrorist incidents in Turkey until 2016 Erdoğan was accused by his critics of having a 'soft corner' for ISIS However, after the attempted coup, Erdoğan ordered the Turkish military into Syria to combat ISIS and Kurdish militant groups. Erdoğan's critics have decried purges in the education system and judiciary as undermining the rule of law however Erdoğan supporters argue this is a necessary measure as Gulen-linked schools cheated on entrance exams, requiring a purge in the education system and of the Gulen followers who then entered the judiciary.

Erdoğan's plan is "to reconstitute Turkey as a presidential system. The plan would create a centralized system that would enable him to better tackle Turkey's internal and external threats. One of the main hurdles allegedly standing in his way is Fethullah Gulen's movement ..." In the aftermath of the coup attempt, a groundswell of national unity and consensus emerged for cracking down on the coup plotters with a National Unity rally held in Turkey that included Islamists, secularists, liberals and nationalists. Erdoğan has used this consensus to remove Gulen followers from the bureaucracy, curtail their role in NGOs, Turkey's Ministry of Religious Affairs and the Turkish military, with 149 Generals discharged. In a foreign policy shift Erdoğan ordered the Turkish Armed Forces into battle in Syria and has liberated towns from IS control. As relations with Europe soured over in the aftermath of the attempted coup, Erdoğan developed alternative relationships with Russia, Saudi Arabia and a "strategic partnership" with Pakistan, with plans to cultivate relations through free trade agreements and deepening military relations for mutual co-operation with Turkey's regional allies.

=== State of emergency and purges ===
On 20 July 2016, five days after the coup attempt, Erdoğan declared a state of emergency. It was first scheduled to last three months. The Turkish parliament approved this measure. The state of emergency was later extended for another three months, amidst the ongoing 2016 Turkish purges including comprehensive purges of independent media and detention of tens of thousands of Turkish citizens politically opposed to Erdoğan. More than 50,000 people have been arrested and over 160,000 fired from their jobs by March 2018.

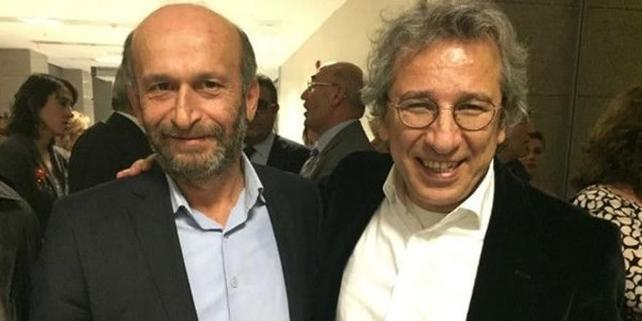
Turkish journalists Can Dündar and Erdem Gül were arrested facing sentences up to life imprisonment.

In August 2016, Erdoğan began rounding up journalists who had been publishing, or who were about to publish articles questioning corruption within the Erdoğan administration, and incarcerating them. The number of Turkish journalists jailed by Turkey is higher than any other country, including all of those journalists currently jailed in North Korea, Cuba, Russia, and China combined. In the wake of the coup attempt of July 2016 the Erdoğan administration began rounding up tens of thousands of individuals, both from within the government, and from the public sector, and incarcerating them on charges of alleged "terrorism." As a result of these arrests, many in the international community complained about the lack of proper judicial process in the incarceration of Erdoğan's opposition.

In April 2017 Erdoğan successfully sponsored legislation effectively making it illegal for the Turkish legislative branch to investigate his executive branch of government. Without the checks and balances of freedom of speech, and the freedom of the Turkish legislature to hold him accountable for his actions, many have likened Turkey's current form of government to a dictatorship with only nominal forms of democracy in practice. At the time of Erdoğan's successful passing of the most recent legislation silencing his opposition, United States President Donald Trump called Erdoğan to congratulate him for his "recent referendum victory."

On 29 April 2017 Erdoğan's administration began an internal Internet block of all of the Wikipedia online encyclopedia site via Turkey's domestic Internet filtering system. This blocking action took place after the government had first made a request for Wikipedia to remove what it referred to as "offensive content". In response, Wikipedia co-founder Jimmy Wales replied via a post on Twitter stating, "Access to information is a fundamental human right. Turkish people, I will always stand with you and fight for this right."

In January 2016, more than a thousand academics signed a petition criticizing Turkey's military crackdown on ethnic Kurdish towns and neighbourhoods in the east of the country, such as Sur (a district of Diyarbakır), Silvan, Nusaybin, Cizre and Silopi, and asking an end to violence. Erdoğan accused those who signed the petition of "terrorist propaganda", calling them "the darkest of people". He called for action by institutions and universities, stating, "Everyone who benefits from this state but is now an enemy of the state must be punished without further delay." Within days, over 30 of the signatories were arrested, many in dawn-time raids on their homes. Although all were quickly released, nearly half were fired from their jobs, eliciting a denunciation from Turkey's Science Academy for such "wrong and disturbing" treatment. Erdoğan vowed that the academics would pay the price for "falling into a pit of treachery".

On 8 July 2018, Erdoğan sacked 18,000 officials for alleged ties to US based cleric Fethullah Gülen. Of those removed, 9000 were police officers with 5000 from the armed forces with the addition of hundreds of academics. On 17 July 2018, the state of emergency was lifted, eight days after Erdoğan renewed his term as an executive president.

=== Press freedom ===
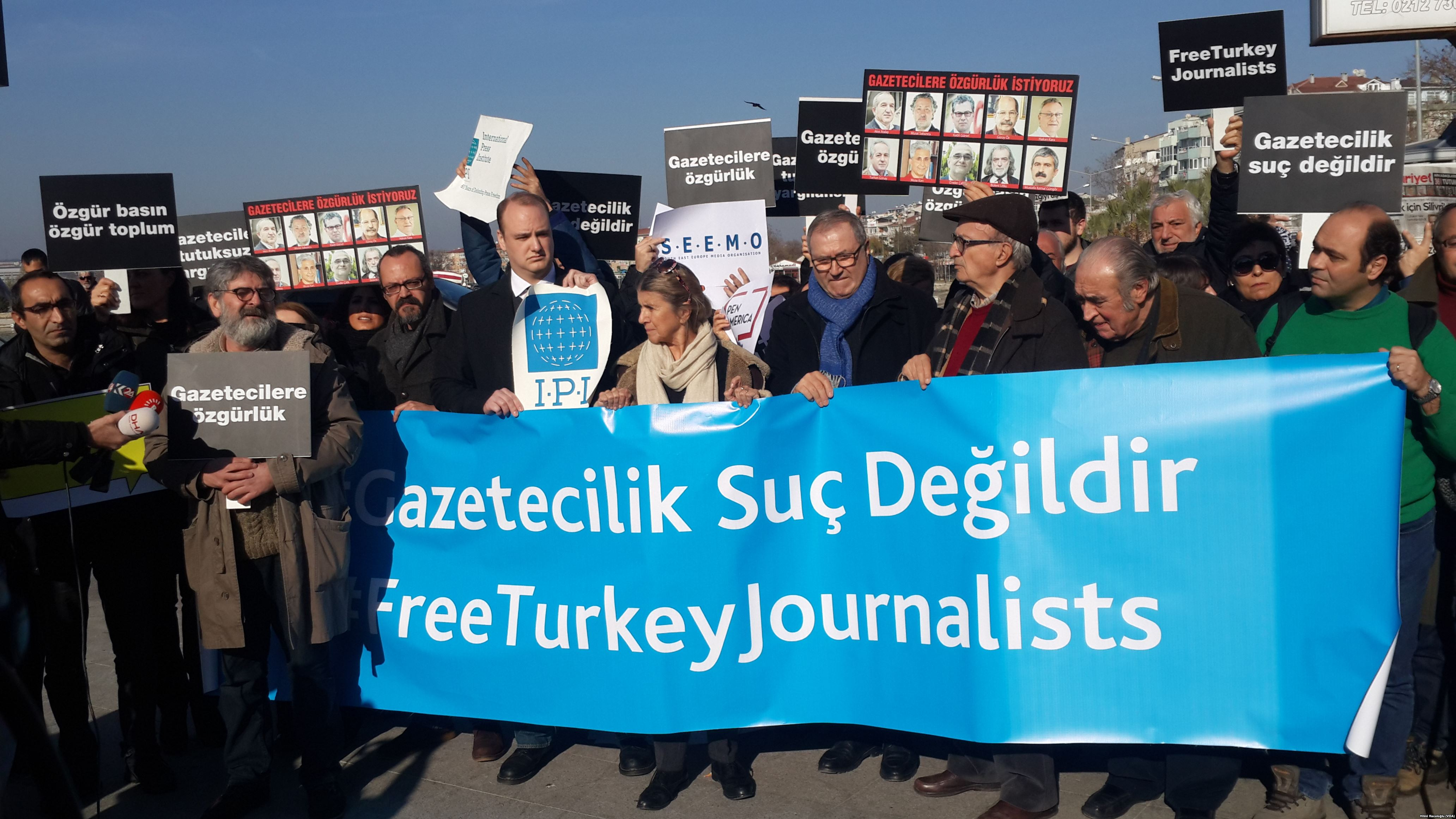
Turkish journalists protesting imprisonment of their colleagues on Human Rights Day, 10 December 2016

President Erdoğan and his government pressed for court action against the remaining free press in Turkey. One of the targeted newspapers was Zaman, which was seized in March 2016. In response, Morton Abramowitz and Eric Edelman, former U.S. ambassadors to Turkey, condemned Erdoğan's actions in an opinion piece published by the Washington Post: "Clearly, democracy cannot flourish under Erdoğan now." "The overall pace of reforms in Turkey has not only slowed down but in some key areas, such as freedom of expression and the independence of the judiciary, there has been a regression, which is particularly worrying," rapporteur Kati Piri said in April 2016 after the European Parliament passed its annual progress report on Turkey.

On 22 June 2016, Erdoğan said that he considered himself successful in "destroying" Turkish civil groups "working against the state", a conclusion that had been confirmed some days earlier by Sedat Laçiner, Professor of International Relations and rector of the Çanakkale Onsekiz Mart University: "Outlawing unarmed and peaceful opposition, sentencing people to unfair punishment under erroneous terror accusations, will feed genuine terrorism in Erdoğan's Turkey. Guns and violence will become the sole alternative for legally expressing free thought."

After the July 2016 coup attempt, over 200 journalists were arrested and over 120 media outlets were closed. Cumhuriyet journalists were detained in November 2016 after a long-standing crackdown on the newspaper. Subsequently, Reporters Without Borders called Erdoğan an "enemy of press freedom" and said that he "hides his aggressive dictatorship under a veneer of democracy".

In April 2017, Turkey blocked all access to Wikipedia over a content dispute. The block was lifted in January 2020 following a court ruling.

== 2017 constitutional referendum vote ==
On Sunday, 16 April 2017, a constitutional referendum was held, where the voters in Turkey (and Turkish citizens abroad) voted on a set of 18 proposed amendments to the Constitution of Turkey. The amendments include the replacement of the existing parliamentary system with a presidential system. The post of prime minister would be abolished, and the presidency would become an executive post vested with broad executive powers. Parliament would be increased from 550 seats to 600 seats. The referendum also called for changes to the Supreme Board of Judges and Prosecutors.

=== 2018 currency and debt crisis ===
The Turkish currency and debt crisis of 2018 was caused by the Turkish economy's excessive current account deficit and foreign-currency debt, in combination with Erdoğan's increasing authoritarianism and his unorthodox ideas about interest rate policy. Economist Paul Krugman described the unfolding crisis as "a classic currency-and-debt crisis, of a kind we've seen many times", adding: "At such a time, the quality of leadership suddenly matters a great deal. You need officials who understand what's happening, can devise a response and have enough credibility that markets give them the benefit of the doubt. Some emerging markets have those things, and they are riding out the turmoil fairly well. The Erdoğan regime has none of that."

== Foreign policy ==
=== Syrian civil war ===
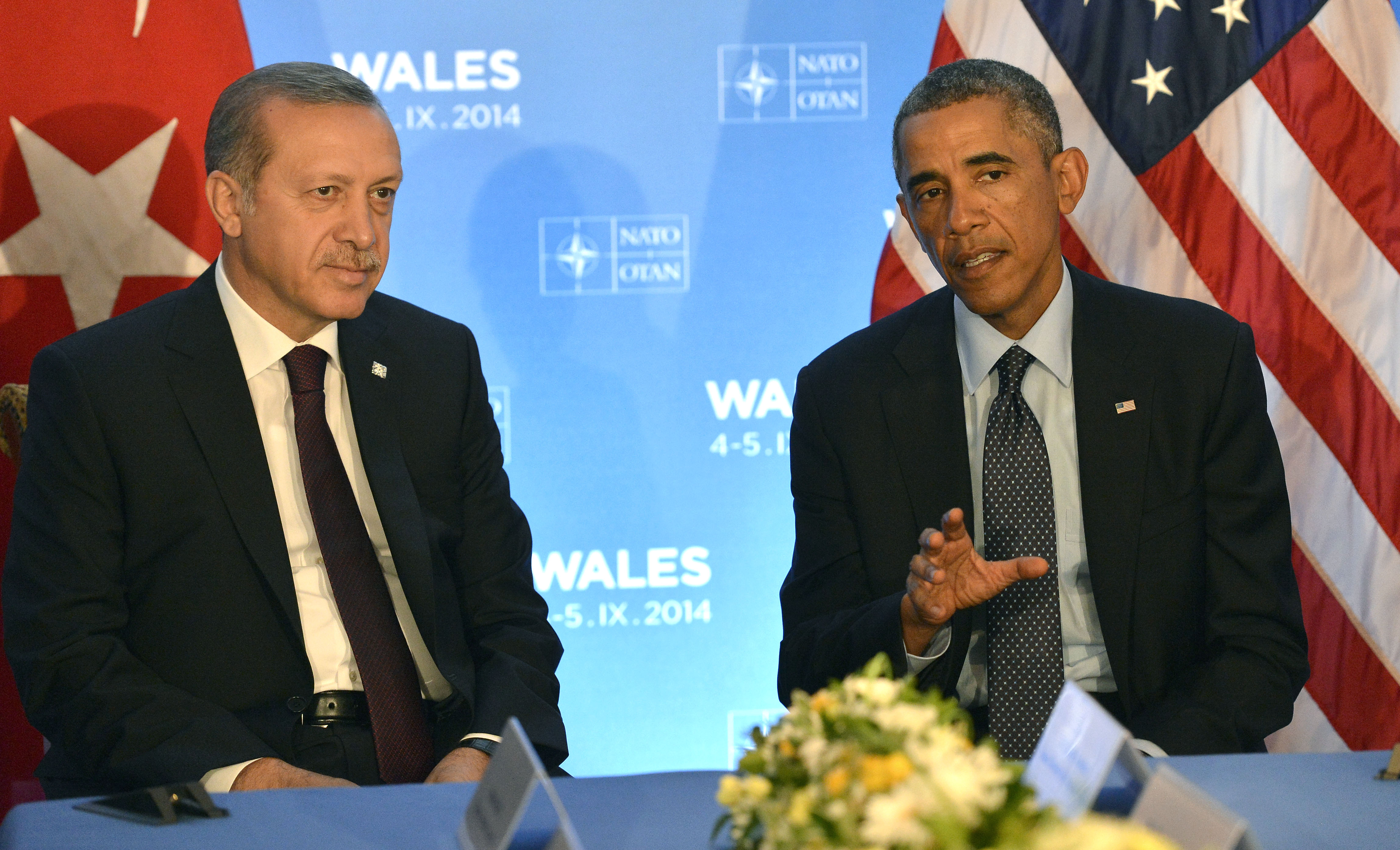
Erdoğan meeting U.S. President Barack Obama during the 2014 Wales summit in Newport, Wales

Amid claims that the Turkish government funds IS fighters, several Kurdish demonstrations broke out near the Turkish-Syrian border in protest against the government's inactivity. These protests escalated during the fighting in the border town of Kobane, with 42 protestors being killed following a brutal police crackdown. Voicing concerns that aid to Kurdish fighters would assist PKK rebels in resuming terrorist attacks against Turkey, Erdoğan held bilateral talks with Barack Obama regarding IS during the 5–6 September 2014 NATO summit in Newport, Wales. In early October, United States Vice President Joe Biden accused Turkey of funding IS, to which Erdoğan angrily responded, "Biden has to apologize for his statements" adding that if no apology is made, Biden would become "history to me." Biden subsequently apologised. In response to the U.S. request to use İncirlik Air Base to conduct air strikes against IS, Erdoğan demanded that Bashar al-Assad be removed from power first. Turkey lost its bid for a Security Council seat in the United Nations during the 2014 election; the unexpected result is believed to have been a reaction to Erdoğan's hostile treatment of ethnic Kurds fighting ISIS on the Syrian border and a rebuke of his willingness to support IS-aligned insurgents opposed to Syrian president Bashar al-Assad.

As president, Erdoğan has been a strong advocate of an executive presidency that would boost his own powers and has maintained an active influence over political affairs despite the symbolic nature of his office. In 2016, he was accused of forcing the resignation of Prime Minister Ahmet Davutoğlu due to his scepticism over the proposed presidential system, resulting in his replacement by close ally Binali Yıldırım. He has also come under fire for constructing Ak Saray, the world's largest palace on Atatürk Forest Farm and Zoo for his own use as president and has been repeatedly accused of breaching the constitutional terms of his office by not maintaining political neutrality. In 2015, amid consistent allegations that he maintained financial links with Islamic State of Iraq and the Levant militants, revelations that the state was supplying arms to militant groups in Syria in the 2014 National Intelligence Organisation lorry scandal led to accusations of high treason. In July 2015, Turkey became involved in the war against ISIS. The Turkish military has simultaneously launched airstrikes against Kurdistan Workers' Party bases in Iraq. In July 2015, a raid by US special forces on a compound housing the Islamic State's "chief financial officer", Abu Sayyaf, produced evidence that Turkish officials directly dealt with ranking IS members.

=== Bilateral relations ===
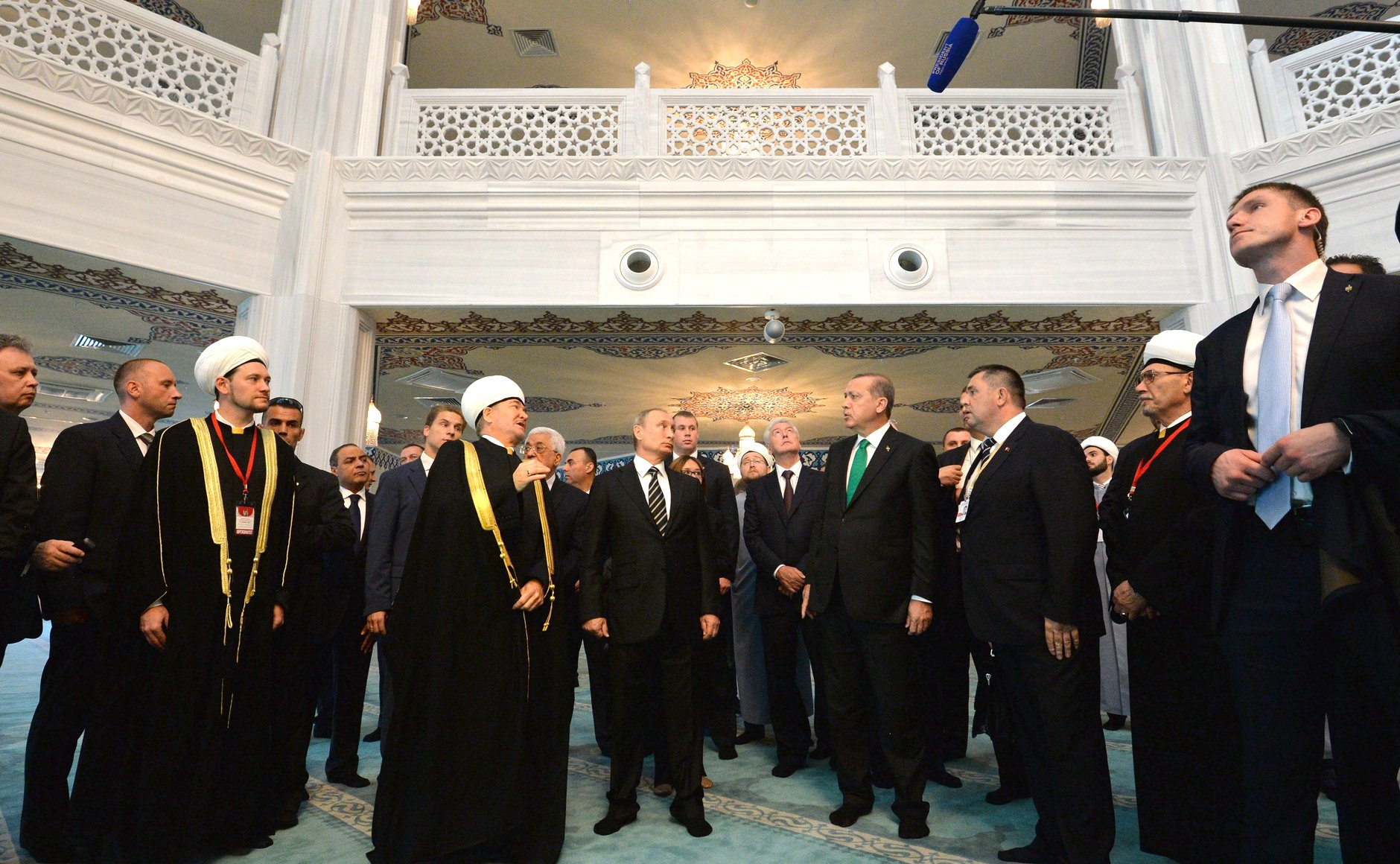
Erdoğan, Russian President Vladimir Putin and Mahmoud Abbas attend Moscow's Cathedral Mosque opening ceremony, 23 September 2015

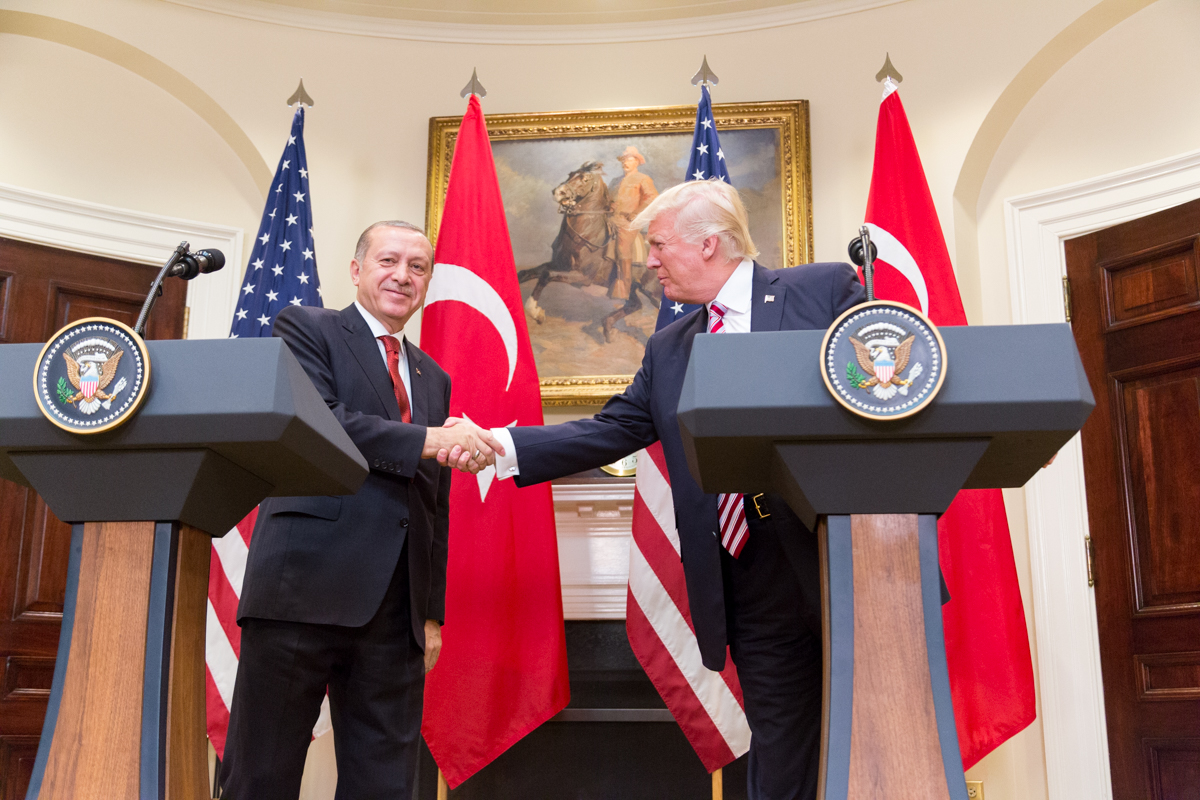
Erdoğan meets with President Donald Trump in the Roosevelt Room at the White House, Washington, D.C., 16 May 2017

In July 2014, after Mohamed Morsi, Egypt's first president to gain power through an election, was ousted by the military in 2013, Erdoğan labeled newly elected Egyptian President Abdel Fattah el-Sisi an "illegitimate tyrant". The Egyptian Foreign Ministry warned that the Egypt–Turkey relationship would be worsened.

In February 2016 Erdoğan threatened to send the millions of refugees in Turkey to EU member states, saying: "We can open the doors to Greece and Bulgaria anytime and we can put the refugees on buses ... So how will you deal with refugees if you don't get a deal? Kill the refugees?"

In an interview to the news magazine Der Spiegel, the German minister of defence Ursula von der Leyen said on Friday, 11 March 2016, that the refugee crisis had made good cooperation between EU and Turkey an "existentially important" issue. "Therefore it is right to advance now negotiations on Turkey's EU accession".

In its resolution "The functioning of democratic institutions in Turkey" from 22 June 2016, the Parliamentary Assembly of the Council of Europe warned that "recent developments in Turkey pertaining to freedom of the media and of expression, erosion of the rule of law and the human rights violations in relation to anti-terrorism security operations in south-east Turkey have ... raised serious questions about the functioning of its democratic institutions."

Relations between Turkey and Israel began to normalize after Israeli Prime Minister Netanyahu officially apologized for the death of the nine Turkish activists during the Gaza flotilla raid. However, in response to the 2014 Israel–Gaza conflict, Erdoğan accused Israel of being "more barbaric than Hitler", and conducting "state terrorism" and a "genocide attempt" against the Palestinians.

As of 2015, Turkey is actively supporting the Army of Conquest, an umbrella Syrian rebel group that reportedly includes an al-Qaeda linked al-Nusra Front and another Salafi coalition known as Ahrar al-Sham. Al-Nusra Front and Islamic State (ISIL) sometimes cooperate with each other when they fight against the Syrian government. In late November 2016, Erdoğan said that the Turkish military launched its operations in Syria to end Assad's rule, but retracted his statement shortly afterwards.

In March 2015, Erdoğan said that Turkey supported the Saudi Arabian-led intervention in Yemen against the Shia Houthis and forces loyal to former president Ali Abdullah Saleh.

Erdoğan is defender of the Crimean Tatars' minority rights. On 20 August 2016 Erdoğan told his Ukrainian counterpart Petro Poroshenko that Turkey would not recognize the 2014 Russian annexation of Crimea; calling it "Crimea's occupation".

In January 2017, Erdoğan said that the withdrawal of Turkish troops from Northern Cyprus is "out of the question" and Turkey will be in Cyprus "forever".

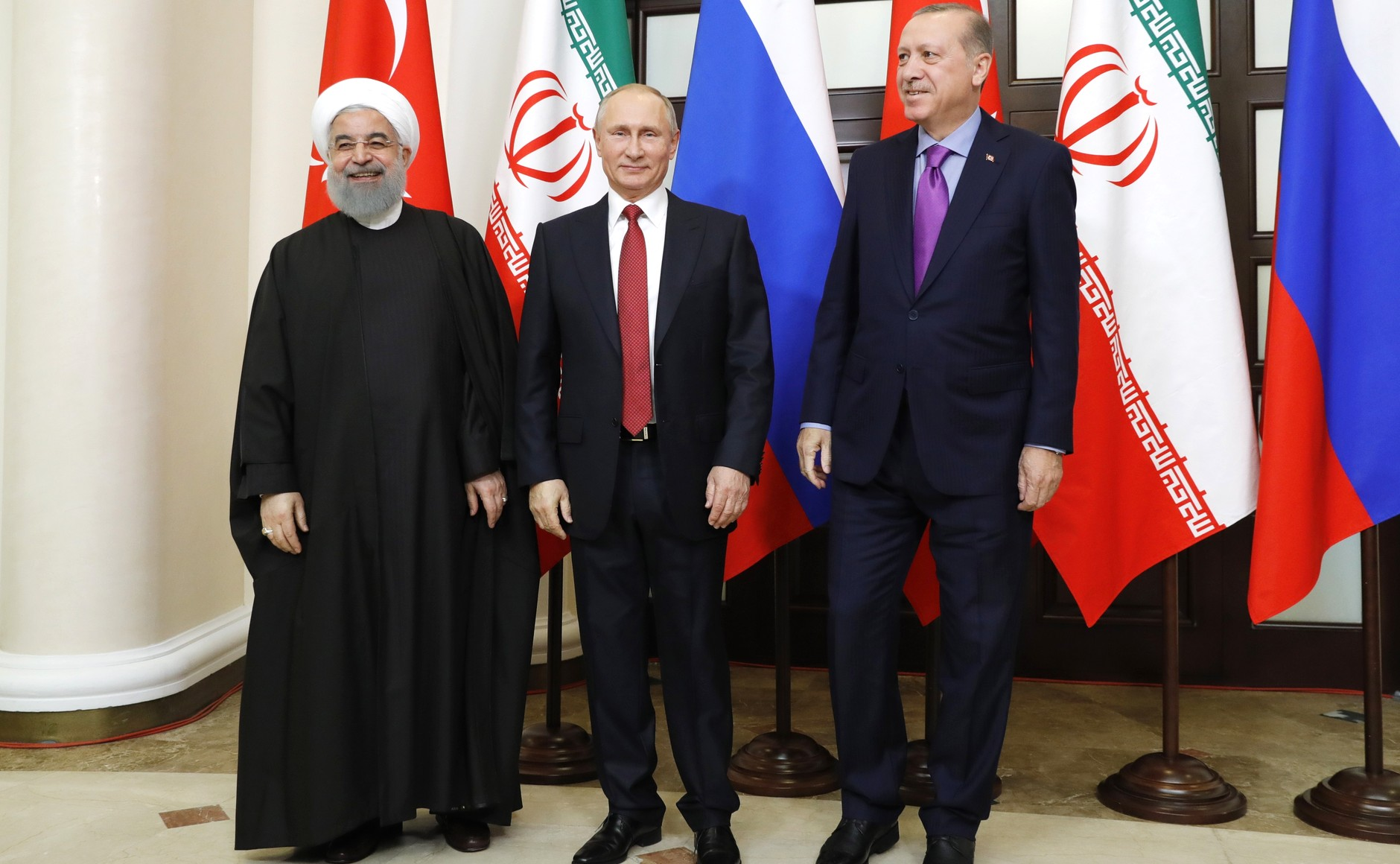
Erdoğan, Putin and Iranian President Hassan Rouhani met in Sochi to discuss Syria, 22 November 2017

In March 2017, Turkish President Recep Tayyip Erdoğan stated to the Turks in Europe "Make not three, but five children. Because you are the future of Europe. That will be the best response to the injustices against you." This has been interpreted as an imperialist call for demographic warfare.

Bilateral trade between Turkey and China increased from $1 billion a year in 2002 to $27 billion annually in 2017. Erdoğan has stated that Turkey might consider joining the Shanghai Cooperation Organisation instead of the European Union.

In June 2017 during a speech, Erdoğan called the isolation of Qatar as "inhumane and against Islamic values" and that "victimising Qatar through smear campaigns serves no purpose".

According to The Economist, Erdoğan is the first Turkish leader to take the Turkish diaspora seriously, which has created friction within these diaspora communities and between the Turkish government and several of its European counterparts.

In December 2017, President Erdoğan issued a warning to Donald Trump, after the U.S. President acknowledged Jerusalem as Israel's capitol. Erdoğan stated, "Jerusalem is a red line for Muslims", indicating that naming Jerusalem as Israel's capitol would alienate Palestinians and other Muslims from the city, undermining hopes at a future Capitol of a Palestinian State. Erdoğan called Israel a "terrorist state". Naftali Bennett dismissed the threats, claiming "Erdoğan does not miss an opportunity to attack Israel".

In January 2018, the Turkish military and its Free Syrian Army and Sham Legion allies began a cross-border operation in the Kurdish-majority Afrin Canton in Northern Syria, against the Kurdish-led Democratic Union Party (PYD) and the U.S.-supported YPG Kurdish militia. On 10 April, Erdoğan rebuked a Russian demand to return Afrin to Syrian government control.

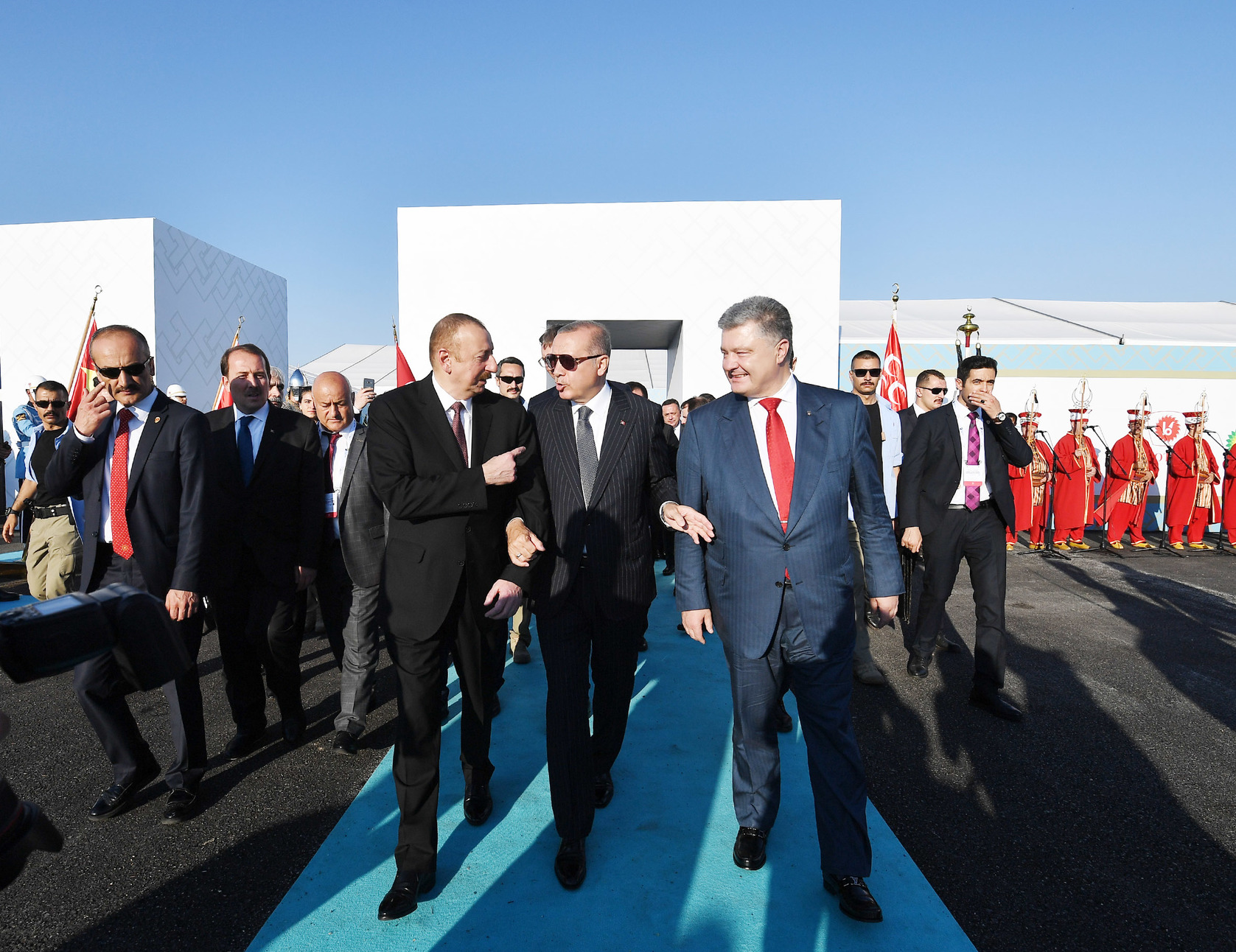
Presidents of Turkey, Azerbaijan and Ukraine at the opening ceremony of the Trans-Anatolian gas pipeline, 12 June 2018

In February 2018, President Erdoğan expressed Turkish support of the Republic of Macedonia's position during negotiations over the Macedonia naming dispute saying that Greece's position is wrong.

In March 2018, President Erdoğan criticized the Kosovan Prime Minister Ramush Haradinaj for dismissing his interior minister and Intelligence Chief for failing to inform him of an unauthorized and illegal secret operation conducted by the National Intelligence Organization of Turkey on Kosovo's territory that led to the arrest of six people allegedly associated with the Gülen movement.

In May 2018, British prime minister Theresa May welcomed Erdoğan to the United Kingdom for a three-day state visit. Erdoğan declared that the United Kingdom is "an ally and a strategic partner, but also a real friend ... The cooperation we have is well beyond any mechanism that we have established with other partners." Erdoğan also told Theresa May that journalists jailed in Turkey are "terrorists". Turkey has imprisoned more than 160 journalists, making it the world's biggest jailer of journalists.

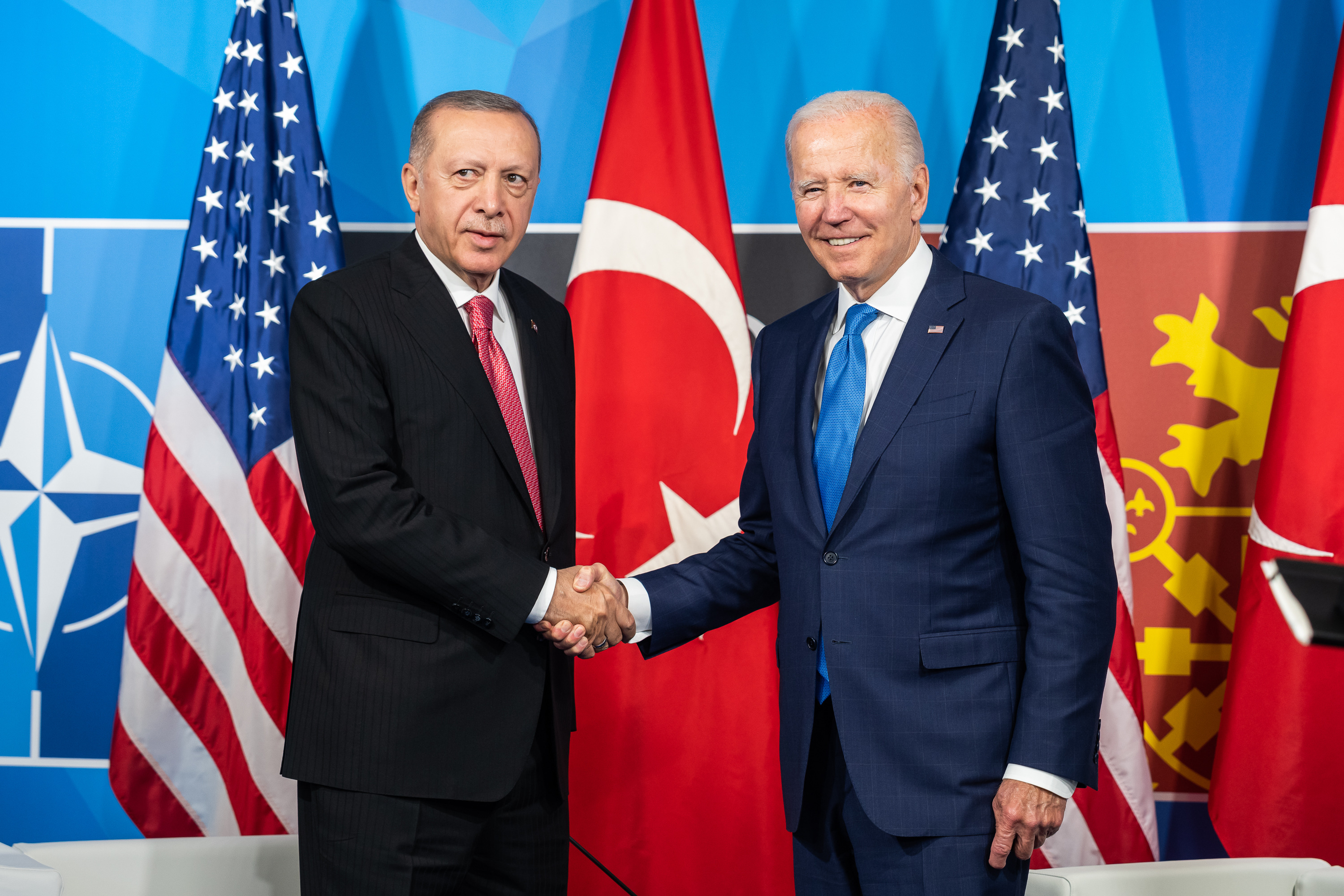
Erdoğan meeting U.S. President Joe Biden during the 2022 Madrid summit in Madrid, Spain

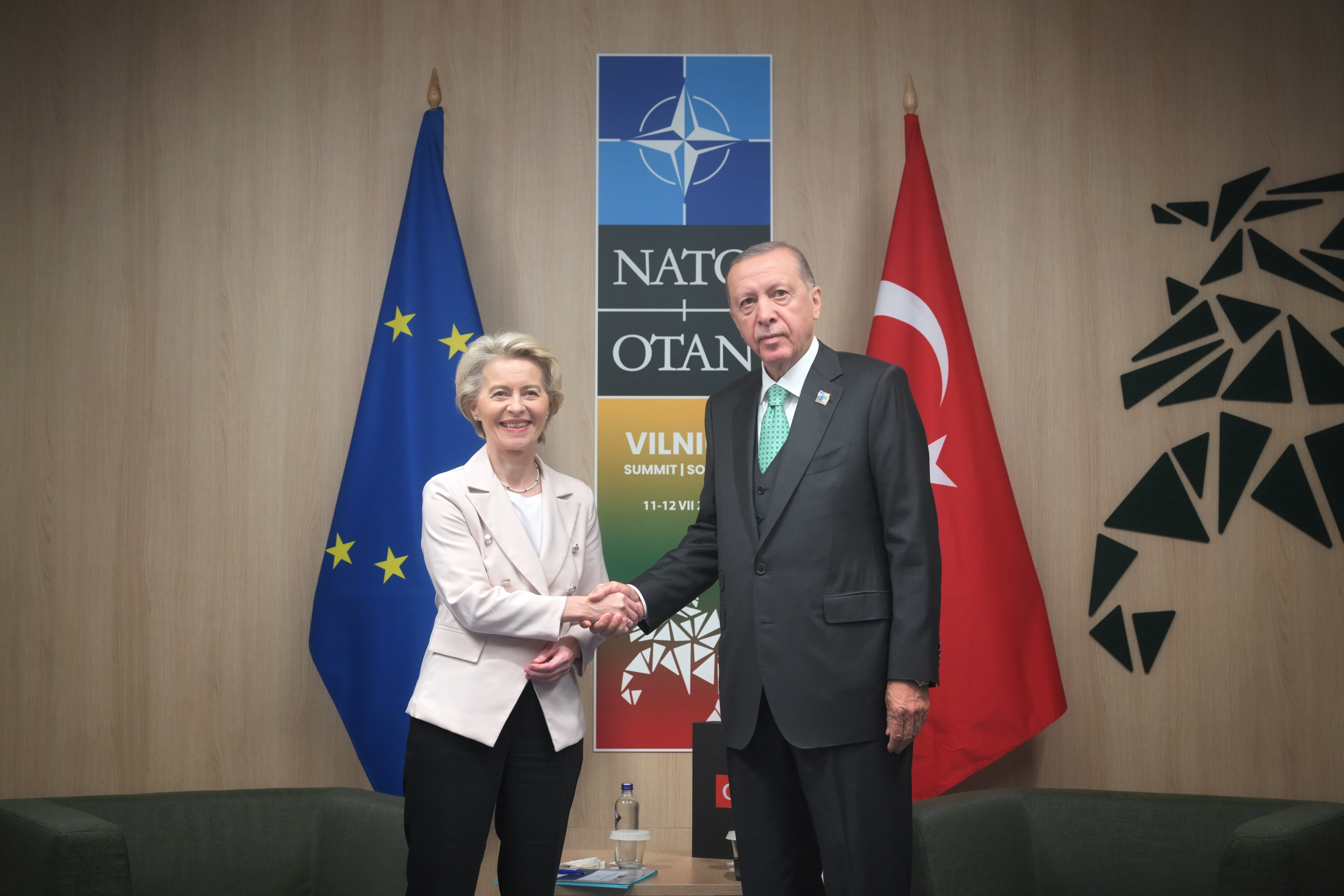
Erdoğan meeting President of the European Commission Ursula von der Leyen during the 2023 Vilnius summit in Vilnius, Lithuania

On 1 August 2018, the U.S. Department of Treasury sanctioned two senior Turkish government ministers who were involved in the detention of American pastor Andrew Brunson. Erdoğan said that the U.S. behavior will force Turkey to look for new friends and allies. The U.S.–Turkey tensions appear to be the most serious diplomatic crisis between the NATO allies in years. In May 2022, President Erdoğan temporarily blocked the applications of Finland and Sweden to join NATO on the grounds that they support the PKK, YPG and followers of Fethullah Gülen. In September 2022, President Erdoğan announced that his country aims to become a member of the Shanghai Cooperation Organization. In September 2023, President Erdoğan announced that the European Union was well into a rupture in its relations with Turkey and that they would part ways during Turkey's European Union membership process.

== See also ==
- List of presidents of Turkey
- Premiership of Recep Tayyip Erdoğan
