= Serhat Kılıç =

Turkish actor and presenter (1975–2026)

- Born: Serhat Mustafa Kılıç; 8 July 1975; Ankara, Turkey
- Died: September 2026 (aged 51); Kağıthane, Istanbul, Turkey
- Resting place: Karşıyaka Cemetery, Ankara
- Occupations: Actor; presenter
- Years active: 1992–2026

Serhat Mustafa Kılıç (8 July 1975 – September 2026) was a Turkish actor and presenter on radio and television.

== Life and career ==
Originally from Malatya, Kılıç enrolled in the Bilkent University School of Music and Performing Arts, Theater Department, in 1994 with a scholarship. He graduated with honors from this school in 1998. His first professional experience on stage was in an adaptation of Ariel Dorfman's play Widows in 1998, directed by Rutkay Aziz at the Ankara Art Theatre. He worked at Diyarbakır State Theatre between 1999 and 2000. During the same period, he gave acting lessons at Diyarbakır City Theatres and directed the play Barış Adası at the same institution. In 2002, he was appointed to the Erzurum State Theatre as an actor to complete his compulsory service. In 2005, he completed his master's degree at Hacettepe University Ankara State Conservatory and started teaching as a lecturer at Erzurum Atatürk University, Faculty of Fine Arts, Department of Theatre. In 2008, he resigned from his position at the State Theatres to continue his studies in Istanbul. Among the venues where he worked while in Istanbul were Tiyatro Dot and BKM. During the 2009–2010 season, he joined the Istanbul City Theatres with the play Generalna proba samoubstiva. It was staged at Istanbul City Theatres for three seasons to sold-out audiences. Kılıç was nominated for the Most Successful Musical and Comedy Male Actor of the Year at the 14th Afife Theatre Awards for his performance in this play, in which he portrayed four different characters. In 2012, he founded a production company called Cats & Dogs (Soho Istanbul). In November 2014, he founded the Serhat Kılıç School, which provides lessons in acting, writing, dance, and vocal training.

Kılıç played the character Ergun in the period comedy Seksenler for six seasons. He portrayed the character of Imam Hamdi in the film Kış Uykusu, which won at the Cannes Film Festival and was directed by Nuri Bilge Ceylan. With his performance in this film, he was nominated for the Best Supporting Actor award at the 47th SİYAD Awards. He was cast in the military series Söz, which was nominated for International Emmy Awards. He portrayed Salih Bozok in the film Veda, based on the life of the first Turkish president, Mustafa Kemal Atatürk, and Köse Mihal in the series Kuruluş: Osman, based on the life of Osman I.

He was cast in the hit period series Hatırla Sevgili. He joined the popular comedy Benim Annem Bir Melek as an Azerbaijani character. He was cast in the youth crime series Öğretmen, an adaptation of Mr. Hiiragi's Homeroom. He was cast in hit series such as Ezel, Yol Arkadaşım, Maraşlı, and Bizim Evin Halleri. His web series include Şeref Bey and Avcı.

Kılıç appeared in the detective film series Çember. He was cast in many films, including Baskın Karabasan, Nokta, Robinson Crusoe ve Cuma, Mavzer, Topal Şükran'ın Maceraları, Cenazemize Hoş Geldiniz, and Yol Arkadaşım.

On 5 September 2026, Kılıç was found dead at his home in Kağıthane, Istanbul. He was 51. On 8 September, he was interred at Karşıyaka Cemetery in Ankara.

== Theatre ==
=== As actor ===
- Barış Adası Korsanlara Karşı: Hakan Güven – Ankara State Theatre – 1998 – director: Hakan Güven
- Widows: Ariel Dorfman – Ankara State Theatre – 1998 – director: Rutkay Aziz
- A Midsummer Night's Dream: William Shakespeare – Diyarbakır State Theatre – 1999 – director: Semih Sergen
- The Government Inspector: Nikolai Gogol – Diyarbakır State Theatre – 1999 – director: Zurab Siharulidze
- Ghetto: Yehoshua Sobol – Ankara State Theatre – 2000 – director: Erhan Gökgücü
- Azizname: Yücel Erten – Ankara State Theatre – 2000 – director: Yücel Erten
- A Month in the Country: Ivan Turgenev – Ankara State Theatre – 2002 – director: Zurab Siharulidze
- Scapin the Schemer: Molière – Erzurum State Theatre – 2003 – director: Ahmet Mümtaz Taylan
- The Ride Down Mt. Morgan: Arthur Miller – Erzurum State Theatre – 2003 – Abdullah Ceran
- As You Like It: William Shakespeare – Erzurum State Theatre – 2004 – director: Zurab Siharulidze
- Memurin Faslı: Coşkun Irmak – Erzurum State Theatre – 2004 – director: Abdullah Indır
- The Good Doctor: Anton Chekhov – Erzurum State Theatre – 2005 – director: Emre Erçil
- Karımla Evleniyorum: Ephraim Kishon – Erzurum State Theatre – 2005 – director: Levent Ulukut
- Bug: Tracy Letts – Tiyatro Dot – 2006 – director: Murat Daltaban
- More Plays than One: Michael Frayn – Beşiktaş Cultural Center – 2007 – director: Mehmet Ergen
- Shoot/Get Treasure/Repeat: Mark Ravenhill – Tiyatro Dot – 2008 – director: Murat Daltaban
- Generalna proba samoubstiva: Dušan Kovačević – Istanbul City Theatres – 2009 – director: Nurullah Tuncer
- Terror - Ferdinand von Schirach – Serhat Kılıç Sahne Ankara – 2018 – director: Yücel Erten
- Tek Kişilik Şehir – Behiç Ak – Serhat Kılıç Sahne Ankara – 2018 – director: Serhat Nalbantoğlu
- Gece Sempozyumu – Eric De Volder – 2018 – director: Mesut Arslan

=== As director ===
- Barış Adası: Hakan Güven – Diyarbakır City Theatre – 1999
- Pıtlatan Bal: Aziz Nesin – Erzurum State Theatre – 2004

== Filmography ==
=== Film ===
- Nokta: Derviş Zaim – 2008 – Selim
- Veda: Zülfü Livaneli – 2010 – Salih Bozok
- Kış Uykusu: Nuri Bilge Ceylan – 2014 – Imam Hamdi
- Robinson ve Cuma: Gürcan Yurt – 2015 – Robinson
- Baskın Karabasan: Can Evrenol – 2015 – Policeman
- Yol Arkadaşım – 2017 – (Buğrahan)
- Çember: Ateş Üstünde – 2019 – (Adem Yılmaz)
- Topal Şükran'ın Maceraları – 2019 – (Selim)
- Mavzer – 2020 (Veysi)
- Cenazemize Hoş Geldiniz: Neslihan Yeşilyurt – 2023 – Necati

==== Short film ====
- Sonsuz

=== Television series ===
- 2000 – Saksıdaki Ağaç (Durmuş)
- 2000 – Bizim Evin Halleri (Karl Gurur)
- 2006 – Hatırla Sevgili (Kamil Gündüz)
- 2008–2009 – Yol Arkadaşım (İlker Elmastaş)
- 2009 – Benim Annem Bir Melek (İbadullah)
- 2010–2011 – Ezel (Selim Uğurlu)
- 2012–2016 – Seksenler (Ergun Plak)
- 2017 – Çember (Commissioner Adem)
- 2017–2019 – Söz (Çolak)
- 2020 – Öğretmen (Taner Aslan)
- 2021 – Şeref Bey (Nejat)
- 2021 – Maraşlı (Necati Türel)
- 2021–2022 – Kurulus: Osman (Mihail Koses)
- 2023 – Tetikçinin Oğlu (Esat Uncular)
- 2023 – Kirli Sepeti (Feyyaz)
- 2025 – Kardelenler (Raci Korkmaz)
- 2025 – Mehmed: Fetihler Sultanı (Molla Lutfi)

=== Television programs ===
- Mutluluğun Anahtarı/Küçük Şeyler – TRT1 – 2000–2007
- Uyanık Bar – FOX TV – 2009–2010
- Heberler (with Memet Ali Alabora, Levent Kazak, and Mahir İpek) – Turkmax – 2010–2013
- Paranoyak (TV show) TV 8 – 2011
- İnan Bana – Star TV – 2013
- Büyük Risk – Show TV – 2014
- Görevimiz Komedi – FOX TV – 2016
- Çok Tatlı – Kanal D – 2018

== Radio programs ==
- Radio Night & Day – Ankara FM – 1992–1994
- Baykuş & Karga (with Erdem Akakçe) – Green Radio – 1994–1997
- Geceden Sabaha (with Gaye Filiz Çele) – Ankara TRT FM – 2000–2001

== Awards ==
- 20th Sadri Alışık Theatre and Cinema Awards – Selection Committee Special Award (Kış Uykusu)
