= Tanju (name) =

Tanju is a unisex Turkish given name. It means blessed by God in old Turkish. It was used by Chinese as a reference to Turkic khans. Tanju is equivalent to Tanhu, Shanyu, Chanyu. Notable people with the name include:

- Tanju Çolak (born 1963), Turkish football player
- Tanju Gürsu (1938–2016), Turkish actor
- Tanju Kayhan (born 1989), Austrian football player of Turkish origin
- Tanju Korel (1944–2005), Turkish actor
- Tanju Okan (1938–1996), Turkish singer
- Tanju Öztürk (born 1989), German-Turkish football player

== See also ==
- Tanju, the art of pistol defense often learned in the martial art of jujutsu
