= Hülya Darcan =

Turkish actress (born 1951)

- Born: 27 April 1951 (age 75); İzmir, Turkey
- Years active: 1967–present
- Spouse: Tanju Korel (m. 1974; died 2005)
- Children: 2, including Bergüzar Korel

Hülya Darcan (born 27 April 1951) is a Turkish actress best known for portraying Hayme Hatun, Ertuğrul's mother, in historical series Diriliş: Ertuğrul from 2014 to 2019. She is the mother of actress Bergüzar Korel and mother-in-law of Halit Ergenç.

== Biography ==
Her family is of Albanian descent. She is a graduate of high school. In 1967, at the age of 16, she was 3rd in the Ses Mecmuası cover star contest, one of the famous magazines of the era. As a result, she received an offer from the cinema. She played the lead role with Fikret Hakan, Ekrem Bora and Tugay Toksöz in her first film Silahları Ellerinde Öldüler.

She married Tanju Korel, whom she met in 1971, and married in 1974. They had two children, Zeynep, who was born in 1977, and Bergüzar Korel born in 1982.

== Filmography ==
=== Television ===
- 2026 - Şule: Senin Hikâyen
- 2024 - Kül Masali
- 2021-2022 - Bir Zamanlar Çukurova
- 2020 - Şeref Sözü
- 2014–2019 - Diriliş: Ertuğrul
- 2012-2014 - Dila Hanım
- 2012 - Leyla'nın Evi
- 2011 - Kalbim Seni Seçti
- 2010 - Samanyolu
- 2008 - Binbir Gece (guest appearance)
- 2007 - Tutsak
- 2007 - Vazgeç Gönlüm
- 2006 - İyi ki Varsın
- 2005 - Zeytin Dalı
- 2004-2006 - Büyük Yalan
- 2003 - Hırçın Menekşe
- 2003 - Baba
- 2002 - Zeybek Ateşi
- 1995 - Bizim Ev

=== Films ===
- 2026 - Bazı Aşklar Yarım Kalır
- 1990 - Kara Elmas
- 1973 - Tarkan: Güçlü Kahraman (Tarkan and the Armless Hero)
- 1973 - Dağlar Kurbanı
- 1973 - Ali ile Gül
- 1973 - Muhteşem Hırsız
- 1973 - Ali'ye Gönül Verdim
- 1973 - Kaderimiz
- 1972 - Örümcek
- 1972 - Cehennemin Beş Delisi
- 1972 - Yirmi Yıl Sonra
- 1972 - İnsafsız
- 1971 - Fakir Kızın Kısmeti
- 1971 - Dudaktan Tabanca
- 1971 - En Kralına Tek Kurşun
- 1971 - Fedailer Mangası
- 1971 - Kanunsuz Yaşayanlar
- 1971 - Ölmeden Tövbe Et
- 1971 - Sıra Sende Yosma
- 1971 - Silahlar Konuşuyor
- 1971 - Yalnız Değiliz
- 1971 - Yumruk Yumruğa
- 1971 - Haraç
- 1970 - Kaderin Ağları
- 1970 - Tehlikeli Oyun
- 1970 - Canlı Hedef (1970 film)
- 1970 - Dağların Kartalı
- 1970 - Altın Tabancalı Adam
- 1970 - Aslan Yürekli Mahkum
- 1970 - Deli Ormanlı
- 1970 - Kadın Satılmaz
- 1970 - Kanlı Kader
- 1970 - Kara Leke
- 1970 - Yaslı Gelin
- 1969 - Ana Yüreği
- 1969 - Hedefte Vuruşanlar
- 1969 - Kanlı Gelinlik
- 1969 - Kendi Düşen Ağlamaz
- 1969 - Sabah Olmasın
- 1969 - Şeytanın Oyunu
- 1969 - Şirvan
- 1969 - Anadolu Soygunu
- 1969 - Asi Kabadayı
- 1969 - Asrın Kralı
- 1969 - Beyaz Mendilim
- 1969 - Bir Aşk Türküsü
- 1969 - Çile
- 1969 - Dağa Çıkan Kız
- 1969 - Kurşunların Kanunu
- 1969 - Çakırcalı Mehmet Efe ve Ayşe
- 1969 - Dişi Eşkiya
- 1969 - Beşikteki Miras
- 1968 - Gültekin Asya Kartalı
- 1968 - Hakanlar Savaşı
- 1968 - Sinanoğlu'nun Dönüşü
- 1968 - Sinanoğlu
- 1968 - Karanlık Yollar
- 1968 - Bir Mahkum Kaçtı
- 1968 - Talihsiz Meryem
- 1968 - Beş Ateşli Kadın (Five Hot Women)
- 1968 - Dertli Pınar
- 1967 - Kanunsuz Toprak
- 1967 - Kurbanlık Katil
- 1967 - Çelik Bilek
- 1967 - Kara Kartal
- 1967 - Silahları Ellerinde Öldüler
