= Mustafa (film) =

- Theatrical Poster
- Directed by: Can Dündar
- Written by: Can Dündar
- Starring: Yetkin Dikiciler; Bahadır Yazıcı; Cemalettin Canlı; Ulaş Canlı
- Narrated by: Yetkin Dikiciler; Can Dündar; Beyhan Saran; Arif Soysalan
- Edited by: Candan Murat Özcan
- Music by: Goran Bregović
- Distributed by: Warner Bros. Pictures
- Release date: 28 October 2008
- Running time: 130 minutes
- Country: Turkey
- Language: Turkish
- Budget: 900.000 TL

Mustafa is a 2008 Turkish biographical documentary about Mustafa Kemal Atatürk, the founder and first president of the modern state of Turkey, which was written and directed by Can Dündar. The film, which controversially concentrates on Atatürk's personal life, is the first documentary covering Atatürk's life from his early years to his death. It was released on Republic Day, 2008, to coincide with the 85th anniversary of the foundation of the Turkish Republic.

== Synopsis ==
The documentary tells Atatürk's life from an objective point of view and tries to give a sympathetic account of a real-life story. The film detaches him from known stereotypes and presents him as a human who has fears, weaknesses, desires and ideals. It is the first film that depicts the private side of the deified leader, who, according to the filmmakers, remained lonely despite being among crowds.

== Cast ==
- Yetkin Dikinciler
- Bahadır Yazıcı
- Cemalettin Canlı
- Ulaş Canlı
- Nazan Gezer
- Saadet Özen
- Saadet Türker
- Nejat Semerci
- Selin Soylu
- Mustafa Sütçü

== Production ==
A detailed literature review was made of books written about Atatürk, national and international newspapers and diplomatic letters in preparation for the production. Dündar and his team were given special access to many national and international archives, including those at the President's Office and the General Staff, uncovering several previously unseen photos, memoirs, special letters and manuscripts of Atatürk which were used in the production.

The film was shot over nine months on locations including Thessalonica, Manastır, Berlin, Damascus, Sofia, Carlsbad and Istanbul, the places where Atatürk lived, and some scenes were shot in the room where he was born and the one where he died. His personal belongings, memoirs, headquarters where he worked, houses where he lived, documents that he left, songs he liked and remarks he uttered were all used in the documentary.

Goran Bregovic composed the soundtrack for the film, which was highly praised.

== Release ==
=== Festival screenings ===
- 45th Antalya Golden Orange Film Festival (10–19 October 2008)
- 2008 Frankfurt Book Fair (16 October 2008)

== Reception ==
=== Box office ===
During the first week of its release in Turkey the film was shown in more than 200 theaters. It was seen by 772,694 people in the first 12 days. Some of its critics used the media to discourage people from seeing it.

=== Reviews ===
Dündar is, according to Today's Zaman reviewer Emine Yıldırım, "a highly respected journalist and one of the most well-respected specialists on republican history" who, "investigates, making use of an extensive pool of archives and carefully crafted reconstructed scenes, not just the political but the personal trials and tribulations of the founder of modern Turkey, supported by an insightfully articulate narrative and the moving music of Goran Bregovic," but "aside from a few anecdotes, his film does not present anything we don’t already know about Atatürk." "The reconstructions use different actors in the different periods of Mustafa Kemal’s life, but we never clearly see any of the actors’ faces, which are hidden in soft shadows in the film's cinematography, perpetuating the notion of Atatürk as a “superhuman figure” who is beyond flesh and bone," Yıldırım continues, "But what am I saying? God knows, what would have happened if Dündar had tried to take bolder steps and shared everything he discovered during his investigations with us? Probably a film that would have been canned."

=== Controversy ===
When Mustafa was released, according to Hürriyet Daily News reviewer Emrah Güler, "it divided the nation into two, with one group praising the movie for its unprecedented portrayal of Atatürk as a human being, while the other criticized Dündar’s attempts at bringing the leader down from his pedestal. The controversy, of course, worked for the film. More than half a million people watched Mustafa in its first week, a fact which helped other Atatürk projects get the go ahead." Later he states, "two films on Atatürk were released, Veda (Farewell) and Dersimiz: Atatürk (Today’s Lesson, Atatürk), each movie being watched by around 1 million people."

"The film brought on so much controversy and debate because of its alternative view of its protagonist that Dündar must have aged at least 10 years because of all the insults he had to put up with from an army of journalists, columnists, historians, politicians, etc.," Today's Zaman reviewer Emine Yıldırım said of the controversy. "If you ask me," he continued, "I thought the film ultimately borders on mediocrity and doesn’t really tell us anything we don’t already know about Atatürk — he was a great leader, he was a visionary, he founded a nation from almost zilch, and, yes, he did have a fondness for the ladies and enjoyed his beverages. No one told anyone to take his or her children to see the film if that's going to be a problem. But the catch is, just like the old saying goes, there’s no bad publicity except your own obituary, and as such, Dündar must at least be relieved to see that his film has attracted 1.1 million viewers."

Atatürk's personal story is not well known in the West. The criticism is based on the level of his portrayal in the film. It is a largely sympathetic portrayal. The film included scenes showing him susceptible to depression and fond of women and alcohol. It is claimed that these scenes degraded the historical significance and served the interests of Islamists. Dundar's film provoked a heated national debate.

Dundar said that the film reveals the face of a genuine and sensitive leader. The Turkish Minister of Culture has also spoken in defence: "He was a human being just like the rest of us, with his hopes, disappointments, his demons and moments of happiness."

Prof. Ahmet Ercan and Prof. Orhan Kural, the heads of anti-smoking groups, filed a complaint arguing that the chain-smoking and heavy drinking portrayed in the film is the advertisement of cigarette companies.

Dündar testified before the Ankara Prosecutor's Office in December 2008 with regard to allegations of promoting smoking and insulting Atatürk's legacy.

Turkcell, Turkey's main mobile phone provider, pulled out of a sponsorship deal, claiming they had no knowledge concerning the fact that the film would concentrate on Atatürk's personal life.

== See also ==
- Veda a 2010 biographical film directed by Zülfü Livaneli
- Dersimiz: Atatürk a 2010 biographical film directed by Hamdi Alkan
