= Veda (film) =

- Film poster
- Directed by: Zülfü Livaneli
- Written by: Zülfü Livaneli
- Produced by: Sevda Kaygisiz
- Starring: Sinan Tuzcu; Dolunay Soysert; Özge Özpirinçci; Serhat Kılıç
- Cinematography: Peter Steguer
- Music by: Zülfü Livaneli
- Production company: Kamera Film
- Distributed by: Tiglon Film
- Release date: February 26, 2010
- Country: Turkey
- Language: Turkish
- Box office: $5,191,199

Veda is a 2010 Turkish biographical film, written and directed by Zülfü Livaneli based on the memoirs of Salih Bozok, which traces the life of Mustafa Kemal Atatürk. The film, which went on nationwide general release across Turkey on February 26, 2010 is one of the highest-grossing Turkish films of 2010.

== Production ==
Filming commenced on 27 October 2009 with location shooting taking place in Antalya, Ayvalık, İzmir and Seferihisar, Turkey.

== Cast ==
- Sinan Tuzcu as Atatürk (age 25–45)
- Serhat Kılıç as Salih Bozok (age 30–57)
- Dolunay Soysert as Zübeyde Hanım
- Özge Özpirinçci as Fikriye Hanım
- Ezgi Mola as Latife Hanım
- Burhan Güven as Atatürk (age 57)
- Kaan Olcay as Atatürk (age 6–7)
- Bartunç Akbaba as Atatürk (age 14–17)
- Erk Bilgiç as Cevat Abbas
- Orhan Aydın as Kurmay Başkanı
- Mehmet Erbil as İsmail Hakkı Tekçe

== Release ==
=== General release ===
The film opened in 300 screens across Turkey on February 26, 2010 at number three in the Turkish box office chart with an opening weekend gross of $1,288,186.

=== Festival screenings ===
- 5th Kaunos Golden Lion Film Festival (July 31-August 6, 2010) – closing film

== Reception ==
=== Box office ===
The movie has made a total gross of $5,191,199.

=== Reviews ===
"How hard is it to make an Atatürk film, one that will make everyone happy," ponders Emine Yıldırım, writing in Today's Zaman, "something that will genuinely show the extraordinary might of a political and military leader and at the same time present the ordinariness of a human being who shows a capacity for fear? From beginning to finish, 'Veda' is the loyal portrayal of the demi-god statue that we have been reading about in history books since we were 5 years old," he continues. "Sure he is made flesh-and-bone via a handful of actors of different ages (Sinan Tuzcu in particular steals most of the screen time portraying the ages 25-45), but they are just mere vessels for dialogue and quotes that we have been reciting since… forever.

The real problematic part of 'Veda' is that while trying to illustrate every aspect of the life of Atatürk (his political and military career, his relationship with his friends and family) the film lacks a focal point and manifests itself as a string of sketches molded out of the sources of documented history. “What is this story really about?” one wonders while observing the meticulous and authentic production design. Surely, he concedes, the technical qualities of the film are outstanding, but do we not already expect that as a given in a historical production such as this? Furthermore, does this sanctify the film as a good film in itself?

'Veda' will surely make an explosion at the local box office; it's the kind of massive epic drama that audiences anticipate when it comes to national history, he further concedes. Those who were enraged by Can Dündar's overtly personal and humanizing take on Atatürk last year with his feature length docu-drama 'Mustafa' will be highly satisfied by writer-musician-film director Zülfü Livaneli's epic historic drama 'Veda,' which aims to stroke our pride in Turkey's founding leader by preferring to pass over any erring human ways that Mustafa Kemal might have harbored. However, he concludes, an Atatürk movie of deeper context ingrained with a fresh approach is yet to be produced."

== See also ==
- Mustafa, a 2008 biographical film directed by Can Dündar
- Dersimiz: Atatürk, a 2010 biographical film directed by Hamdi Alkan
- 2010 in film
- Turkish films of 2010
