= Aylin Livaneli =

Musical artist (born 1966)

- Born: 28 August 1966 (age 59); Ankara, Turkey
- Genres: Pop
- Occupations: Singer, businesswoman
- Instruments: Vocals
- Years active: 1990–present
- Labels: Göksoy Plak; Raks Müzik; İda Müzik
- Website: www.aylinlivaneli.com

Aylin Livaneli (born 28 August 1966) is a writer, composer, and entrepreneur.

== Early life and education ==
Livaneli was born on 28 August 1966 in Turkey to Ülker and Zülfü Livaneli and raised in Sweden and France. In Sweden, she went to Stockholm International School and then graduated from Ecole Active Bilingue in Paris.

== Career ==
After high school, Livaneli began her career as a singer and composer in Turkey. She recorded five albums, some of which contain her own compositions. Between 1992 and 1993, she hosted and co-produced a popular television show, Coke’n’Roll. In 1996, she recorded an album entitled Love is the Answer at Stockholm Records, produced by the Swedish music producer and songwriter, Anders Hansson. One of the songs in the album, ‘Baby U Don't Love Me’ climbed to number one in the dance charts in Sweden a year after.

In 1997, Aylin Livaneli took part in a collaboration entitled Artists for the Environment with artists such as Elton John, Peter Gabriel, Dire Straits, and Seal, in which they recorded an album. to raise funds for the UK-based Earth Love Fund, an organization that supports environmental conservation projects in tropical rainforests worldwide. That same year, Livaneli organized and presented a benefit concert to rescue the stray dogs of Istanbul.

== Higher education ==
Livaneli quit her music career in 1998 to pursue higher education. She traveled to New York and attended the New York University, studying English Literature, then transferred to, and graduated from, University of London (LSE) with a BS’c degree in Politics and International relations. During her university years, She wrote for the Turkish daily newspapers Hürriyet, Milliyet, Vatan, and the magazine Yeni Aktüel.

== Later career ==
After her graduation, she founded IDA Music Company, together with her mother, Ulker Livaneli, which was later sold to Seyhan Muzik. She also helped to form another company along with the President of Imaj Productions, called Film Factory Entertainment Corporation. Aylin Livaneli re-founded her family's company Interfilm Media & Entertainment in 2008 where she earlier worked as an intern, a production assistant, and a production coordinator. She has also written a book entitled Children in the Garden of Exile which consists of essays on life, exile, and philosophy.

Livaneli is the screenwriter and producer of films Elia's Journey, Guardian of The Harem, and Thirst for Life.

== Books ==
- Children in the Garden of Exile

== Films ==
- Guardian of the Harem
- Thirst for Life

== Discography ==
=== Albums ===
- 1990: Don't Go
- 1991: Sevda Değil
- 1992: Bana Müsade
- 1993: Aylin Livaneli Söylüyor
- 1997: Aşkına Kanmam
- 2008: Love Is The Answer

=== EP and singles ===
- 1995: Okulu Asardım
- 1996: Baby U Don't Love Me
- 1996: Hadi Gel
