= Salih Bozok =

Turkish politician

- Born: December 1881; Selanik, Ottoman Empire (present-day Thessaloniki, Greece)
- Died: 25 April 1941 (aged 59–60); Istanbul, Turkey
- Burial place: Cebeci Askerî Şehid
- Spouse(s): Düriye Bozok; Pakize Bozok
- Military career
- Allegiance: Ottoman Empire; Turkey
- Service years: Ottoman Empire: 1903 – November 1918; Turkey: 1920–?
- Rank: Lieutenant colonel
- Commands: Chief aide-de-camp of the commander of the Second Army; Chief aide-de-camp of the commander of the Seventh Army
- Conflicts: Balkan Wars; World War I Turkish War of Independence
- Other work: Member of the TBMM; Member of the administrative board of the Türkiye İş Bankası

Salih Bozok (1881 – April 25, 1941) was an officer of the Ottoman Army, later the Turkish Army and a politician of the Republic of Turkey. He was the chief aide-de-camp of Mustafa Kemal (Atatürk), the founder of modern Turkey.

Bozok was a close childhood and lifelong friend of Atatürk, both having been born in 1881 in Thessaloniki and having attended the Monastir Military High School together. On November 10, 1938, upon witnessing the dead body of Atatürk in the latter's bedroom of Dolmabahçe Palace, a distraught and stunned Bozok stepped outside and shot himself through the chest with a pistol. However, the bullet narrowly missed his heart, and Bozok did not succumb to his fatal wound until April 1941.

Bozok's life and friendship with Atatürk was depicted in the successful 2010 Turkish film Veda. Bozok had Albanian origins through his paternal grandfather, Safer Efendi. This is written and documented by Andrew Mango.

Salih has a son, Cemil Bozok.

== Works ==
- (Salih Bozok - Cemil S.Bozok), Hep Atatürk'ün Yanında", ATATÜRK VAKFI YAYINLARI, Istanbul 2019,
- (Can Dündar), Yaveri Atatürk'ü Anlatıyor, Doğan Kitapçılık, Istanbul, 2001.
- (Cemil S. Bozok), Hep Atatürk'ün Yanında, Çağdaş Yayınları, Istanbul, 1985.

== Medals and decorations ==
- Medal of Independence with Red Ribbon

== See also ==
- Veda (film)

== Sources ==
{https://yenisayfaonline.com/2018/05/11/nesilden-nesile-salih-bozok/}
