= Bergüzar Korel =

Turkish actress

Bergüzar Korel Ergenç
- Born: Bergüzar Gökçe Korel; Istanbul, Turkey
- Occupation: Actress
- Years active: 1998–present
- Spouse: Halit Ergenç (m. 2009)
- Children: 3
- Parent(s): Tanju Korel (father); Hülya Darcan (mother)
- Awards: 2007 Golden Butterfly Awards Best Actress (Binbir Gece); 2013 Golden Butterfly Awards Best Actress (Karadayı)

Bergüzar Gökçe Korel Ergenç (née Korel; Turkish pronunciation: [beɾɟyˈzaːɾ koˈɾel æɾˈɟentʃ]) is a Turkish actress.

== Career ==
Korel made her debut as Leyla in Kurtlar Vadisi: Irak (Valley of the Wolves: Iraq). She came to wide attention after starring as Şehrazat Evliyaoğlu in Binbir Gece. She appeared in Magnificent Century as a guest role of Monica Teresse for one episode (Episode 24). In 2012, she starred as Feride Şadoğlu alongside Kenan İmirzalıoğlu in the popular series Karadayı.

== Personal life ==
Her family is of Cretan Turk and Albanian descent. She graduated from the Theatre department of the Mimar Sinan Fine Arts University. In August 2009, Korel married fellow actor Halit Ergenç, who was her partner in Binbir Gece. In February 2010, she gave birth to the couple's first child, a boy named Ali. Another son, named Han, was born in March 2020, followed by a daughter, named Leyla, in November 2021.

== Filmography ==
=== Film ===
Year	Title	Role	Notes
1999	Şen Olasın Ürgüp		
2006	Kurtlar Vadisi Irak	Leyla	Leading role
2009	Aşk Geliyorum Demez	Gozde	Leading role
2019	Bir Aşk İki Hayat	Deniz	Leading role
2024	On Saniye	Yasemin	Leading role

=== Web ===
Year	Title	Role	Notes
2021	Stuck Apart	Füsun	Netflix
2024	Düğüm	Neslihan	Amazon Prime
2026	İlk ve Son	Güneş	HBO Max

=== Television ===
Year	Title	Role	Notes
1998	Kırık Hayatlar		
2001	Cemalım	Suna	
2005	Zeytin Dalı	Iklim	
2006	Emrah Adak		
2006–2009	Binbir Gece	Şehrazat Evliyaoğlu Aksal	Leading role
2010–2011	Bitmeyen Şarkı	Feraye	Leading role
2011	Muhteşem Yüzyıl	Signora Monica Teresa Gritti	Special guest appearance
2012–2015	Karadayı	Feride Şadoğlu	Leading role
2016–2018	Vatanım Sensin	Azize	Leading Role
2024–2025	Annem Ankara	Zuhal İnceata	Leading role
2026	A.B.İ.	Leyla	Leading role

=== Presenter/host ===
- 2009 – Bergüzarla Çocuktan Al Haberi

== Discography ==
Albums

- 2016 – Aykut Gürel Presents: Bergüzar Korel
- 2020 – Aykut Gürel Presents: Bergüzar Korel, Vol. 2

== Awards ==
Year	Ceremony	Award	Work
2006	Altin Kelebek (Golden Butterfly Awards)	Best Actress	Binbir Gece
2007	RTGD - (Radio Television Press Association)	TV Star award	Binbir Gece
2008	Zodiac Schools	Most Successful Actress	Binbir Gece
2010	Lion Max	Best Children's Program	Best anchor award
2012	Turkey Radio Awards	Best Actress	Karadayı
2012	RTGD - (Radio Television Press Association)	Actress of the Year	Karadayı
2012	Ayakli Gazette Newspaper Awards	Best Drama Actress	Karadayı
2012	YBTB	Actress of the Year	Karadayı
2013	Altin Kelebek (Golden Butterfly Awards)	Best Actress	Karadayı
2013	Ayakli Gazette' Newspaper Awards	Best Actress	Karadayı
2013	Radio Television Media Oscars	Best Actress	Karadayı
2013	Golden Lion Awards	Best Actress	Karadayı
2013	Altin (Golden) Objektif Awards	Best Actress	Karadayı
2013	Quality Awards	Best Actress	Karadayı
2013	Engelsiz Yasam Vakfi Awards	Best Actress	Karadayı
2013	Yerel Ve Bolgessel	Best Actress	Karadayı
2014	Yildiz Teknik University Awards	Best Actress	Karadayı
2014	Quality Magazine Awards	Best Actress	Karadayı
2014	Ayakli Gazette Newspaper Awards	Best Actress	Karadayı
2014	Halic University Awards	Best Actress	Karadayı
2015	Bilkent Television Awards	Best Actress	Karadayı
2015	Altin (Golden) Objektif Awards	Best Actress	Karadayı
