= Binbir Gece =

Turkish television series

- Also known as: Thousand and One Nights
- Genre: Serial drama; Telenovela (Note: In Latin America and Brazil it is known as a Telenovela.)
- Written by: Yildiz Tunç; Mehmet Bilal; Murat Lütfü; Ethem Yekta
- Directed by: Kudret Sabancı
- Starring: Halit Ergenç; Bergüzar Korel; Tardu Flordun; Ceyda Düvenci; Ergün Demir; Metin Cekmez; Mert Firat
- Country of origin: Turkey
- Original language: Turkish
- No. of seasons: 3
- No. of episodes: 90

Production
- Executive producer: Erol Avci

Original release
- Network: Kanal D
- Release: November 7, 2006 – May 12, 2009

Binbir Gece ('One Thousand and One Nights') is a Turkish soap opera revolving around four main characters: Sehrazat, Onur, Kerem and Bennu. The story is loosely based on the story of One Thousand and One Nights, better known as Arabian Nights. It stars Halit Ergenç as Onur, Bergüzar Korel as Şehrazat, Tardu Flordun as Kerem and Ceyda Düvenci as Bennu.

== Title ==
The title is the name of the story better known to the English-speaking world as Arabian Nights. The film's storyline is loosely based on the story, containing references thereto.

== Synopsis ==
Şehrazat is an aspiring architect who is in desperate need for money to pay for the treatment of her son, Kaan, who is suffering from leukemia. After pleading to borrow money from several sources, she is stuck with her boss, Onur, who agrees to give her the money she needs for Kaan's treatment on the condition that she spends a night with him.

== Episodes ==
Season	Episodes	Originally released	
Season	Episodes	First released	Last released
1	29	November 7, 2006	June 19, 2007
2	37	September 11, 2007	June 3, 2008
3	24	September 16, 2008	May 12, 2009

== Cast ==
=== Main ===
- Halit Ergenç as Onur Aksal
- Bergüzar Korel as Şehrazat Evliyaoğlu Aksal
- Ceyda Düvenci as Bennu Ataman Inceoğlu
- Tardu Flordun as Kerem Inceoğlu
- Metin Çekmez as Burhan Evliyaoğlu
- Tomris İncer as Nadide Evliyaoğlu
- Ergün Demir as Ali Kemal Evliyaoğlu
- Yonca Cevher Yenel as Füsun Özçelik Evliyaoğlu
- Meral Çetinkaya as Peride Aksal
- Aytaç Öztuna as Seval Inceoğlu
- Melahat Abbasova as Mihriban Vahapzade
- Canan Ergüder as Eda Akinay (Main villain, commits suicide)
- Efe Çinar as Kaan Evliyaoglu

=== Recurring ===
- Mehmet Polat as Erdal Karayolcu (Villain)
- Mert Firat as Burak Inceoğlu
- Yeliz Akkaya as Melek Ataman
- Sebnem Köstem as Handan Taşçioğlu
- Nihat Ileri as Semih Özşener
- Duygu Çetinkaya as Sezen Özşener
- Füsun Kostak as Cansel Kiliç (Dies of a stroke)
- Bartu Küçükçağlayan as Gani Özçelik
- Feyzan Çapa / Gizem Günes as Buket Evliyaoğlu
- Hazal Gürel as Burcu Evliyaoğlu
- Nehir Nil Karakaya as Burçin Evliyaoğlu
- Metin Belgin as Zafer Gündüzalp (Dies in a plane crash)
- Merih Ermakastar as Mert
- Ayla Algan as Betül
- Suphi Tekniker as Yalçin
- Zeynep Konan as Zeynep
- Nihan Durukan as Ayşen
- Ayce Abana as Beyza Kayaoglu
- Nuray Uslu as Sevgi
- Feridun Düzagaç as Özcan Türkmen (Killed by Eda)
- Volga Sorgu Tekinoğlu as Mahmut Demir (Killed by Eda)
- Ismail Düvenci as Ismail
- Teoman Kumbaracibaşi as Yaman Çandar
- Şennur Nogaylar as Firdevs
- Ebru Aykaç as Yasemin Karakuş (Dies of overdosing)
- Erdal Bilingen as Hakan
- Demet Yekeler as Nimet
- Beste Sürer as Ayşe
- Nazli Ceren Argon as Arzu Işler
- Hazel Çamlidere as Ahu Işler (Villain)
- Ayben Erman as Neriman Işler (Villain)
- Alptekin Serdengeçti as Haldun Kara
- Dilara Kavadar as Nilüfer Aksal
- Nilüfer Silsupur / Ahu Sungur as Jale Eryildiz (Villain, later good, killed by Erdal)
- Ege Aydan as Engin Kayaoğlu
- Ezgi Asaroglu as Duru Kayaoğlu

== Reception ==
Binbir Gece was a hit in Chile, where its success resulted in many Chileans naming their babies Onur (boys) & Sheherazade (girls). It played in the United States, Colombia, Argentina and Brazil. It was a hit in Russia in the Turkish Drama Category. The show was picked up by Netflix in the United States, but curiously only the first 49 episodes as of August 2017. This has infuriated a number of Netflix viewers that watched the series not knowing it would end abruptly at episode 49, leaving many matters unanswered. A writing campaign is underway.

The series became a primetime hit in Croatia, Bosnia and Herzegovina, Montenegro, Serbia and Macedonia as well as in Romania, Albania, Bulgaria, Slovakia and Greece. It increased the popularity of Istanbul as a tourist destination among Serbs and led to a greater interest in learning Turkish.

== Broadcast ==
The series originally aired from November 7, 2006 to May 12, 2009 on Kanal D. It aired in more than 56 countries. The series aired in Chile on Mega from March 3, 2014 until January 4, 2015, in Indonesia on antv as "Shehrazat : Seribu Satu Malam" from August 3, 2015, and in Brazil on Band from March 9, 2015 until September 15, 2015. On March 1, 2021, the series premiered on Nagorik in Bangladesh as Sahasra Ek Rajani. On the same day, it was also made available for streaming on Bongo BD., The series aired in Japan on TV Tokyo from July 21, 2010 until May 5, 2012., The series aired in Germany on sixx from March 21, 2007 until December 31, 2011

== Remake ==
It was announced that it would be remade in Hindi and on 14 October 2022, the first promo of the show starring Aditi Sharma and Adnan Khan titled Katha Ankahee released and premiered on SET India on 5 December 2022.

Country	Original title	English title	Release date	Note
Egypt	An Al Awan أن الأوان	Is The Night	2024	
Lebanon	Al Thaman الثمن	The Price	2023	
India	Katha Ankahee	A Story Untold	2022	
Greece	Μια νύχτα μόνο	One night only	2025	

== Awards ==
The major TV awards ceremony in Turkey (often dubbed as the Turkish Oscars), the Altın Kelebek, (Golden Butterfly Awards) resulted in three wins for the series.

Awards	Category	Nominee(s)	Result
34th Golden Butterfly Awards	Best Drama Series	Binbir Gece	Won
34th Golden Butterfly Awards	Best Actor	Halit Ergenc	Won
34th Golden Butterfly Awards	Best Actress	Bergüzar Korel	Won
