= 2014 National Intelligence Organisation scandal in Turkey =

The 2014 National Intelligence Organisation scandal (Turkish: MİT tırları skandalı "The scandal of the NIO rigs") is a military political scandal regarding the role of Turkish National Intelligence Organisation (MİT) in supplying weapons to neighboring Syria during the Syrian Civil War.

The scandal broke out on 1 January 2014, when an anonymous call was made to the Adana Attorney General, claiming that a number of lorries were on their way to Syria carrying weapons. The Turkish Gendarmerie's search of the lorries on 19 January was cut short by the Governor of Adana Hüseyin Avni Coş, who claimed that the lorries belonged to the MİT. The prosecutor who ordered the search, as well many of the Gendarmerie soldiers who conducted it, were all removed from their posts and some faced legal investigation. The government, then led by Prime Minister Recep Tayyip Erdoğan, first claimed that the cargo of the lorries were a 'national secret', but later claimed that the lorries were carrying food and medical supplies to the Turkmen population in Syria. Many critics of the government alleged that the lorries were in fact supplying arms to rebel groups fighting in the Syrian Civil War.

On 29 May 2015, the newspaper Cumhuriyet released footage of the search, confirming that the lorries were in fact carrying weapons, with the title "Here are the weapons Erdoğan denied" (İşte Erdoğan'ın yok dediği silahlar). The government subsequently faced calls to resign while an investigation began into Cumhuriyet for releasing the footage. A legal complaint against Erdoğan was made by Republican People's Party (CHP) Member of Parliament Hüseyin Aygün, who accused him of high treason for supplying weapons to enemies of the Turkish state. A ban was placed on the footage of the lorries, which emerged to have transported 1,000 mortar shells, 1,000 rifled artillery shells, 50,000 machine gun rounds and 30,000 rifle bullets to what was alleged to be Al Qaeda and the Islamic State (IS) in Syria, but according to later academic study was the Free Syrian Army and rebel Syrian Turkmen.

On June 2, 2015, Erdoğan sued Can Dündar, the editor of Cumhuriyet, and requested 2 aggravated life sentences plus 42 years of imprisonment. Dündar and Cumhuriyet's Ankara representative Erdem Gül were arrested on November 26, 2015. After 92 days in prison, Dündar and Gül were released on February 26, 2016, after the Constitutional Court of Turkey decided that their detention was an "undue deprivation of liberty".

On May 6, 2016, Can Dündar was sentenced to imprisonment for five years and 10 months for "leaking secret information of the state". Dündar subsequently fled to Germany in June 2016 to avoid imprisonment. An arrest warrant for him was issued on October 31, 2016.

In 2019, 22 of the 54 suspects involved in the seizure were sentenced to prison terms ranging from 2 to 20 years for acting on the instructions of a terrorist organization, FETÖ, as well as obtaining and exposing the secret documents of the state.

On December 23, 2020, Can Dündar was sentenced in absentia to 27 years and six months in prison for espionage and aiding an armed terrorist organisation (FETÖ).

== Events ==
=== 1 January: Hatay ===
On 1 January 2014, a soldier from the Turkish gendarmerie reported that several lorries were transporting weapons to Syria. In response, the Adana Prosecutor Aziz Takçı requested the police to conduct a search on the lorries. With the alleged influence of Adana Governor Hüseyin Avni Coş, the police officially recorded the cargo of the lorries as 'humanitarian aid', with soldiers not being permitted to attend to the scene.

=== 19 January: Adana ===
With a similar tip-off occurring on 19 January, the prosecution requested the head of Adana's Gendarmerie, Colonel Özkan Çokay to conduct the search on lorries in Adana again allegedly carrying weapons to Syria. The prosecution also threatened to begin legal investigations into soldiers who disobeyed Çokay's command. With 125 gendarmes, the lorries were stopped and searched, with Governor Coş soon becoming aware of the situation and arriving at the search area. Having obtained an emergency command to stop the search, Coş claimed that the lorries belonged to the National Intelligence Organisation (MİT). Çokay refused and demanded that the MİT send a command to stop the search itself, causing a rise in tensions between the gendarmerie, MİT personnel and other police officers who arrived later on.

== Aftermath ==
=== Legal investigations ===
The Turkish state TV and radio regulator RTÜK issued a ban on both written and visual reporting in regards to the situation, on the grounds that legal investigations had begun into the search. In January 2015, the Supreme Board of Judges and Prosecutors (HSYK) took the decision to begin disciplinary investigations into five prosecutors involved in giving the order to search the lorries, suspending them from their positions for three months. These included the Adana Attorney General at the time of the scandal, Süleyman Bağrıyanık, and the acting Attorney General Ahmet Karaca. Prosecutor Aziz Takçı was also among those who were subject to a disciplinary investigation, having been initially removed from his post on 24 January 2014. On 8 May 2014, 13 soldiers who had stopped the lorries in Adana were put on trial, with the prosecution calling for life imprisonment. 34 gendarmerie soldiers who were involved in searching the lorries were arrested in April 2015 on suspicion of 'illegal bugging, espionage, invasion of privacy, the perversion of justice on personal beliefs, forgery of official documents, setting up, leading and being part of a terrorist organisation, attempting to obstruct and to bring down the Turkish government'. The anonymous caller who had tipped off the Adana Attorney General about the lorries was identified as a gendarme in Hatay, who was arrested in Diyarbakır on 26 February 2015. In December 2020, a Turkish court sentenced 27 people with prison for stopping the trucks.

=== Government response ===
The legal investigations into soldiers and prosecutors involved in stopping and searching the lorries were heavily criticised by the opposition, who claimed that the government was attempting to cover up the real cargo of the trucks. The legal crackdown on the personnel involved also raised questions about judicial impartiality, with many claiming that the ordeal showed that the government was directly in control of the judiciary.

The government initially claimed that the cargo in the lorries was a 'national secret'. Shortly after, the government claimed that the lorries were supplying food and medical aid to the Turkmen population in Syria, who had been subject to a humanitarian crisis as a result of the Syrian Civil War. Recep Tayyip Erdoğan accused the prosecutor who ordered the search of being affiliated with Fethullah Gülen and his Cemaat Movement, while Customs Minister Hayati Yazıcı claimed that only rifles for sporting purposes were included in the cargo. With the lorries in Hatay being prevented from being searched, the police allegedly recorded the cargo to be 'humanitarian aid'. The Turkmens, however, claimed that they had not received any humanitarian aid from Turkey. The opposition CHP claimed that the lorries had been carrying weapons and accused the government of lying. The CHP's allegations turned out to be true on 29 May 2015, when footage of the search was leaked showing the lorries to have been carrying arms within their cargo.

== Possible motives ==
The opposition and media critics of the government have both accused the government of supplying arms to rebel groups in Syria, with critics identifying Al Qaeda and the IS as possible recipients. However, more moderate opposition groups such as the Free Syrian Army could have also been the recipients of the weapons. Critics who accuse the Justice and Development Party (AKP) government of supplying arms to Al Qaeda or IS point to the AKP's Islamist roots as a possible motive, as well as the government's strong opposition to Syrian President Bashar al-Assad. The opposition CHP, which alleged that the search in Adana proved that the lorries were carrying arms into Syria, accused the government of funding these terrorist organisations. It was also alleged that documents revealing that the true recipients of the lorries' cargo was in fact Al Qaeda and ISIL. The AKP government have been accused of financially supporting ISIL before.

== May 2015 revelations ==
On 29 May 2015, footage recorded during the searches conducted in Adana were released to the newspaper Cumhuriyet. The footage showed that the lorries were in fact carrying arms, amongst humanitarian aid that appeared to have been placed strategically to hide transported weaponry. The revelations occurred just over a week before the June 2015 general election.

=== Domestic reactions ===
In response to the revelations, the government faced calls to resign, while an investigation began into Cumhuriyet regarding the release of the footage. A legal complaint against Erdoğan was made by Republican People's Party (CHP) Member of Parliament Hüseyin Aygün, who accused him of high treason for supplying weapons to enemies of the Turkish state. Investigations began into journalist Can Dündar for writing an article about the footage. The Socialist Party of Refoundation issued a statement accusing Erdoğan, Davutoğlu and former MİT undersecretary Hakan Fidan of war crimes.

=== International reactions ===
- United Nations – In response to the scandal, United Nations spokesperson Stephane Dujarric stated that the UN was strongly against the sending of arms to combatants in Syria, no matter what side they were on or which group they represented.
- France – During a conference organised to discuss the international response to ISIL, the Foreign Minister of France Laurent Fabius stated with regard to the scandal that sending weapons to ISIL was out of the question.
- United States – Deputy Secretary of State Antony Blinken stressed the fact that Turkey, as well as many other countries, had agreed to come together in order to combat ISIL.

== See also ==
- June 2015 Turkish general election
- Turkish involvement in the Syrian Civil War
- Foreign policy of the Recep Tayyip Erdoğan government
- Justice and Development Party
- Judicial system of Turkey
- Censorship in Turkey
- Neo-Ottomanism
- Pan-Islamism
