= Tanju Korel =

Turkish actor (1944–2005)

- Born: 10 October 1944; Istanbul, Turkey
- Died: 21 September 2005 (aged 60); Istanbul, Turkey
- Years active: 1966–2005
- Spouse: Hülya Darcan (m. 1974)
- Children: 2, including Bergüzar

Tanju Korel (10 October 1944 – 21 September 2005) was a Turkish actor and documentary director.

== Life and career ==
Tanju Korel was born on 10 October 1944 in Istanbul. After graduating from Galatasaray High School, he continued his education at the University of Grenoble. In 1966, he took part in an acting competition organized by Perde magazine, where he earned the first place together with the fellow actor Murat Soydan. He made his cinmeatic debut in the same year with a role in the movie Eşkiya. He also appeared in a number of TV series. In 1974, he married actress Hülya Darcan, with whom she had two daughters: Zeynep and Bergüzar. Korel also produced a number of documentaries throughout his career.

== Death ==
Korel died on 21 September 2005 after suffering from lung cancer. His remains were buried at the Zincirlikuyu Cemetery.

== Filmography ==
=== Documentaries directed ===
- Laiklik ve Laik Devlet Anlayışı
- Bitlis - 1990
- Kırşehir'in Dili - 1991
- Çanakkale Şehitleri ve Şehitlikleri
- Türk Sineması'nda Sansür ve Yasaklar

=== As producer ===
- Kara Elmas - 1990

=== As actor ===
- Zeytin Dalı - 2005
- Zeybek Ateşi - 2002
- Benim İçin Ağlama - 2001
- Vasiyet - 2001
- Kırık Hayatlar - 1998
- Sibel - 1998
- Geceler - 1996
- Gerilla - 1994
- Büyük Mükafat - 1992
- Kara Elmas - 1990
- Melekler Şahidimdir - 1988
- Çakırcalı Mehmet Efe - 1987
- Efeler Diyarı - 1987
- Hesap Günü - 1986
- Duvardaki Kan - 1986
- Çelik Mezar - 1983
- Küçük Eller - 1983
- Bekleyiş - 1983
- Batak - 1978
- Uyanış - 1978
- Töre - 1978
- Sarmaş Dolaş - 1977
- Affedilmeyen - 1977
- Oynaş - 1977
- Çakal Avı - 1977
- Hayata Dönüş - 1977
- Elmanın Alına Bak - 1977
- Afilli Delikanlı - 1976
- Tornavida Yaşar - 1976
- Kanlı Sevda - 1975
- El Kapısı - 1974
- Huma Kuşu - 1974
- Kahramanlar - 1974
- Karaların Ali - 1974
- Televizyon Niyazi - 1974
- Öfkenin Bedeli - 1974
- Başlık Parası - 1973
- Dağlar Kurbanı - 1973
- Muhteşem Hırsız - 1973
- Tek Kollu Bayram - 1973
- Ben Böyle Doğdum - 1973
- Bir Garip Adam - 1972
- Atmaca Mehmet - 1972
- Cehennemin Beş Delisi - 1972
- Kan Dökmez Remzi - 1972
- İnsafsız - 1972
- Belalılar Belalısı - 1972
- Kötüler Affedilmez - 1971
- Bugün Sende Yarın Bende - 1971
- Cehenneme Dolmuş Var - 1971
- Dudaktan Tabanca - 1971
- En Kralına Tek Kurşun - 1971
- Hem Döğüş Hem Seviş - 1971
- Kupa Ası Maça Kızı - 1971
- Mezarını Kaz Beni Bekle - 1971
- Ölüm Bana Vız Gelir - 1971
- Öldüren Yumruk - 1971
- Sıra Sende Yosma - 1971
- Silahlar Susmasın - 1971
- Yumruk Yumruğa - 1971
- Haraç - 1971
- Yanık Kezban - 1970
- Anadolu Kini - 1970
- Aslan Yürekli Mahkum - 1970
- Asi ve Cesur - 1970
- Donanma Kamil - 1970
- Kara Leke - 1970
- Koçum Ali - 1970
- Koreli Kemal - 1970
- Kurt Kanı - 1970
- Ölüm Çemberi - 1970
- Sen de Bizdensin - 1970
- Vur Okşa ve Öp - 1970
- Yiğitlerin Türküsü - 1970
- Yiğitlerin Dönüşü - 1970
- Bomba Ahmet - 1970
- Kendi Düşen Ağlamaz - 1969
- Devlerin Öcü - 1969
- Dikenli Hayat - 1969
- Hedefte Vuruşanlar - 1969
- Köprüden Geçti Gelin - 1969
- Sürgünler - 1969
- Gülnaz Sultan - 1969
- Kara Efe - 1969
- Yanık Kaval - 1969
- Yaşayan Hatıralar - 1969
- Yuvasızlar - 1969
- Gültekin Amazon Kızlara Karşı - 1969
- Hayat Kurbanı - 1969
- Yuvamı Yıkamazsın - 1969
- Cingöz Recai - 1969
- Bozkırlar Şahini Targan - 1968
- Dev Adam - 1968
- Gültekin Asya Kartalı - 1968
- Affet Beni Allahım - 1968
- Kral Kim - 1968
- Anjelik ve Deli İbrahim - 1968
- Kara Öfke - 1968
- Nuri Bey Mafiaya Karşı - 1968
- Her Zaman Kalbimdesin - 1967
- Yanık Kalpler - 1967
- Kamalı Zeybeğin İntikamı - 1967
- Kadın Düşmanı - 1967
- Kamalı Zeybek Çakırcalı'ya Karşı - 1967
- Aşkın Merhameti Yoktur - 1967
- Seni Affedemem - 1967
- Eşkiya - 1966
- İstanbul Dehşet İçinde - 1966
