= Tanju =

Tanju is the art of pistol defense often learned in the martial art of jujutsu. Collectively they are an unarmed response to a close range pistol, such as in a mugging situation. The basics of the art are the appraisal of the situation, getting out of the way, and disarming or neutralizing the attacker. Even with the mastery of this art it is often much safer to comply with any person that is pointing a gun at you.
