= Halit Ergenç =

Turkish actor (born 1970)

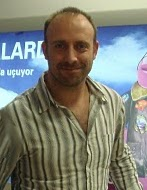
- Ergenç in 2007
- Born: Halit Ergenç; 30 April 1970 (age 56); Istanbul, Turkey
- Education: Beşiktaş Atatürk Anatolian High School; Istanbul Technical University; Mimar Sinan Fine Arts University
- Occupation: Actor
- Years active: 1996–present
- Spouses: Gizem Soysaldı (m. 2007; div. 2008) Bergüzar Korel (m. 2009)
- Children: 3

Halit Ergenç (Turkish pronunciation: [haˈlit æɾˈɟentʃ]; born 30 April 1970) is a Turkish actor known for his role as Sultan Suleiman I in Muhteşem Yüzyıl, Onur Aksal in Binbir Gece and Cevdet in Vatanim Sensin.

== Biography ==
Halit Ergenç was born as the son of Yeşilçam-era actor Mehmet Sait Ergenç on 30 April 1970 in Istanbul. His maternal grandmother is of Albanian descent. He completed his secondary education at Beşiktaş Atatürk High School in 1989 and entered Istanbul Technical University to study Marine Engineering. He graduated from the Operetta and Musical Theatre Department of the Mimar Sinan Fine Arts University. He supported himself working as a computer operator and marketer. He briefly worked as a backing vocalist and dancer for Ajda Pekkan and Leman Sam.

=== TV series ===
He gained recognition with his role in the television series Kara Melek. Following appearances in series Köşe Kapmaca and Böyle mi Olacaktı, Dedem, Gofret ve Ben and Zerda.

In 2004, he took part in the series Aliye with Sanem Çelik and Nejat İşler.

In 2006, he starred as Onur Aksal in the hit series Binbir Gece that aired until 2009.

In 2011 he starred as Suleiman the Magnificent in the hit series Muhteşem Yüzyıl until 2014.

In 2016, he started playing opposite his wife Bergüzar Korel in Vatanım Sensin.

Ergenç was involved in the Gezi protests of 2013, appearing in newspaper photos wearing a Bob Marley T-shirt and surgical mask for protection against tear gas. His presence made for interesting copy, since he at once played the role of one of the Ottoman Empire's foremost leaders in the show Muhteşem Yüzyıl, and at the same time he was protesting the actions of a government very much invested in celebrating Ottoman glory. Ergenç was subsequently summoned with other cultural leaders to a meeting with Turkish Prime Minister Tayyip Erdoğan, and Erdoğan apparently quizzed Ergenç on Ottoman words used by Suleiman, the character whom Ergenç played in Muhteşem Yüzyıl.

=== Film ===
In 2000, he acted in both films Hiç Yoktan Aşk and Ölümün El Yazısı.

In 2005 and 2006, Ergenç took part in the films Babam ve Oğlum directed by Çağan Irmak, The Net 2.0, Tramway and İlk Aşk.

During this period he also had roles in the films Devrim Arabaları which was based on a true story and Acı Aşk. Ergenç also starred as Mustafa Kemal Atatürk in the film Dersimiz Atatürk.

After, he played Fatali Khan Khoyski who the first Prime Minister of the independent Azerbaijan Democratic Republic in Ali & Nino. He played in the movie İstanbul Kırmızısı directed by Ferzan Özpetek.

=== Theatre ===
In 1996, Ergenç began acting at the Dormen Theatre and had his first leading role in the musical The King and I. He continued working in theatre in plays such as Kiss Me, Kate, Tatlı Charity, Beni Seviyor, Kral ve Ben, Amphitrion 2000, Evita, Hayalet and Ötekiler and Şarkılar Susarsa. He went to New York and acted in the musical The Adventures of Zak.

Then, he appeared in a number of plays such as Bugün Git Yarın Gel, Popcorn, Arapsaçı and Sevgilime Göz Kulak Ol.

Ergenç appeared as Willy Loman in Arthur Miller's Death of a Salesman, directed by Rufus Norris, at the Zorlu PSM in June 2026.

== Personal life ==
Since 2009, he has been married to his Binbir Gece co-star Bergüzar Korel with whom he has two sons named Ali (born February 2010) and Han (born March 2020), and a daughter named Leyla (born November 2021.). His younger brother Mehmet Sait Ergenç—named for their father—is also an actor. He has stated that he likes Zeki Demirkubuz's style and Ferzan Özpetek's emotion, but prefers to work the most with Reha Erdem and Çağan Irmak, whom he describes as both young and talented directors.

In 2017, Ergenç visited Pakistan and attended the Lux Style Awards, where he was honoured with the International Icon of the year award, due to his popularity in the country. In his accepting speech, Ergenç said that he had grown up knowing Pakistan as a "brother country".

== Filmography ==
=== Movies ===
Year	Title	Role	Notes
2000	Ölümün El Yazısı		
2004	Okul		
2005	The Net 2.0		
2005	Babam ve Oğlum	Özkan	
2006	Tramvay	Nezih	
2006	İlk Aşk		
2008	Devrim Arabaları	Yüksek Mühendis Uğur	Leading role
2008	Akşamdan Kalma	Mehmet	
2009	Acı Aşk		
2010	Dersimiz: Atatürk	Atatürk	Leading role
2010	Misafir		
2010	Akşamdan Kalma 2	Mehmet	
2012	Akşamdan Kalma 3	Mehmet	
2016	Ali ve Nino	Fatali Khan Khoyski	
2017	İstanbul Kırmızısı	Orhan Şahin	Leading role
2019	Casablanca	Drachon	Supporting role
2021	Azizler	Necati	Supporting role
2024	Intoxicated by Love	Baha al-Din Valad	

=== Web series ===
Years	Title	Roles	Notes
2020	Rise of Empires: Ottoman	Narrator	6 episodes

=== TV series ===
Years	Title	Roles	Notes
1996	Tatlı Kaçıklar	Tom	
1996	Kara Melek	Kürşat	Supporting role
1997	Böyle mi Olacaktı	Halit	
1998	Gurbetçiler		
2000	Hiç Yoktan Aşk	Erdal	mini series
2001	Dedem, Gofret ve Ben	Vedat	Supporting role
2002	Kumsaldaki İzler	Fazıl	Guest star
2002	Zeybek Ateşi	Aleko	Supporting role
2002	Azad		
2002	Zerda	Devran	
2003	Baba	Kartal	Supporting role
2003	Esir Şehrin İnsanları		mini series
2004	Aliye	Sinan Karahan	Leading role
2006-2009	Binbir Gece	Onur Aksal	Leading role
2011–2014	Muhteşem Yüzyıl	Suleiman the Magnificent	Leading role
2016–2018	Vatanım Sensin	Cevdet	Leading role
2020	Babil	İrfan Tuna Saygun	Leading role
2025	Kral Kaybederse	Kenan Baran	Leading role
