= Erdem Gül =

Turkish politician (born 1967)

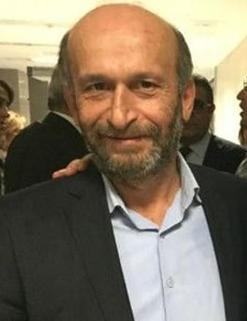
- Born: 1967 (age 58–59); Giresun, Turkey
- Education: Gazi University
- Occupation: Mayor of Princes' Islands
- Children: Two

Erdem Gül (born 1967 in Giresun) is a Turkish politician serving as the mayor of the Princes' Islands since 2019. He was the chief of the Ankara bureau of Turkish secularist newspaper Cumhuriyet between 2010 and 2018. He was arrested in November 2015 after his newspaper published footage purportedly showing the National Intelligence Organization of Turkey (MİT) sending weapons to Syrian Islamist fighters.

Gül studied journalism at Gazi University. He started his career at the ANKA news agency in 1992, where he monitored the rise of Necmettin Erbakan's Millî Görüş movement since the 1994 local elections, where Erbakan's Welfare Party won the mayorship in both Ankara and Istanbul. In 2010, he became parliament reporter for Cumhuriyet.

In November 2015, Cumhuriyet was awarded the 2015 Reporters Without Borders Prize for its "independent and courageous journalism."

Shortly thereafter, Gül and the newspaper's editor-in-chief Can Dündar were arrested on charges of being members of a terror organization, espionage and revealing confidential documents, facing sentences of up to life imprisonment. The investigations had been launched in May, after the newspaper published photos depicting weapons being transferred to Syria in lorries of the National Intelligence Organization, subject of the 2014 MİT trucks scandal. In June 2015, Turkish President Recep Tayyip Erdoğan had publicly targeted Dündar, stating: "The individual who reported this as an exclusive story will pay a heavy price for this." After 92 days in prison, Dündar and Gül were released on 26 February 2016 after the Constitutional Court decided that their detention was a violation of their rights, being an "undue deprivation of liberty".

Gül was elected as the mayor of Princes' Islands in 2019 Turkish local elections.
