= Zülfü Livaneli =

Turkish musician, author, poet, and politician (born 1946)

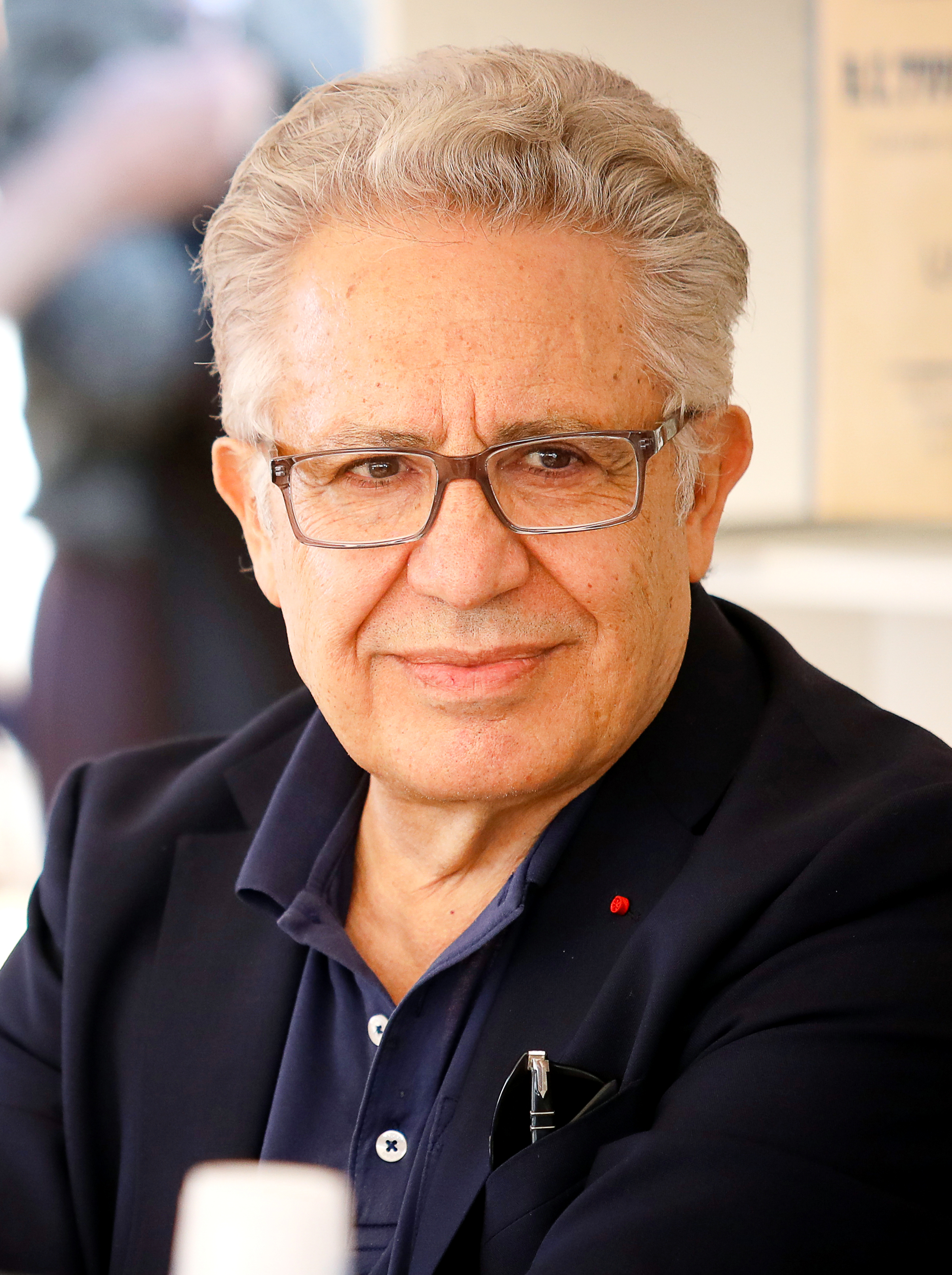
- Zülfü Livaneli in 2019
- Born: Ömer Zülfü Livanelioğlu; 20 June 1946 (age 80)
- Occupations: Author; poet; composer; politician; human rights activist
- Notable work: Bliss, My Brother's Story, Serenade for Nadia
- Spouse: Ülker Livaneli
- Children: Aylin Livaneli
- Awards: Barnes & Noble Discovery of a Great New Author Award, 2006 (Bliss); Balkan Literary Award for Best Novel, 1997 (The Eunuch of Constantinople); Yunus Nadi Literary Award for Best Novel, 2001 (Memory of Snow); Orhan Kemal Literary Award for Best Novel, 2009 (Last Island)
- Website: www.livaneli.net

Ömer Zülfü Livanelioğlu (born 20 June 1946), better known as Zülfü Livaneli, is a Turkish musician, author, poet, and politician.

He was imprisoned several times following the 1971 Turkish military memorandum due to his political views, which led to his exile in 1972. During exile, he lived in Stockholm, Paris, Athens, and New York City, where he collaborated with artists and intellectuals such as Elia Kazan, Arthur Miller, James Baldwin, and Peter Ustinov. He returned to Turkey in 1984.

In 1995, UNESCO appointed him as a Goodwill Ambassador in recognition of his cultural works, political activities, and contributions to world peace. He resigned from this position in 2016 in protest against what he described as the damage by the Turkish State to the historic Kurdish Old Town of Diyarbakir.

Livaneli served as a member of the Grand National Assembly and as part of the Turkish Delegation to the Parliamentary Assembly of the Council of Europe.

== Personal life ==
Livaneli's family is of Georgian descent. His father, Mustafa Sabri Livanelioğlu, held various judicial positions before serving as the First Deputy President of the Court of Cassation from September 1977 to July 1983. Livaneli has four brothers and one sister. When he was 20, his mother died at the age of 38, after which his father remarried. In 1964, Livaneli married translator Ülker Tunçay. They have a daughter, Aylin, who was born in Ankara, Turkey, in 1966.

== Musical career ==
Livaneli released his debut album under the pseudonym "Ozanohad Glu". He later adopted his current name, Zülfü Livaneli, which appeared on his subsequent album, Chants Révolutionnaires Turcs (Turkish revolutionary songs), released in 1973. While in Europe, Livaneli learned from his brother Ferhat that large crowds in Turkey were singing his songs during protests. In response, Livaneli created an album titled Nazim Türküsü, setting his music to poems by Nâzım Hikmet. The album remained on the music charts for 48 weeks.

Livaneli's musical catalog includes approximately 300 songs, a ballet, and a rhapsody recorded by the London Symphony Orchestra. His work has been interpreted by international performers including Joan Baez, Maria Farantouri, and Udo Lindenberg. As a film composer, he has scored thirty productions, notably the 1982 Palme d'Or winner Yol and Helma Sanders-Brahms's Shirin's Wedding. A 1997 performance in Ankara is cited as one of his largest live events, with an estimated attendance of 500,000. In 2010, he sang "Mothers of the Disappeared" with Bono at U2's concert in Istanbul, Turkey, the band's first concert in the city. Livaneli has received awards including the Best Album of the Year Award (Greece), the Edison Award (Holland), Best Album of the Year (Music Critics Guild of Germany), and the Premio Luigi Tenco Best Songwriter Award at the San Remo in 1999.

Livaneli's music achieved significant popularity in the 1980s. In 1986, he met the Greek composer Mikis Theodorakis. Together they produced the album Güneş Topla Benim İçin (Gather the Sun for Me). After its release in Turkey, the album peaked in the Turkish music market. At that time, Livaneli met Ahmet Kaya, another folk singer. The London Symphony Orchestra performed with Livaneli in 1998 and, in 1999, UNESCO assisted Livaneli in releasing that album.

== Political life ==
In addition to his career as an author and poet, Livaneli was active in Turkish politics. In the 1994 Turkish local elections, he was a candidate for mayor of Istanbul for the Social Democratic Populist Party, but was not elected. In the 2002 Turkish general election, Livaneli was elected to the Grand National Assembly as a deputy for Istanbul for the Republican People's Party (CHP). He resigned from the CHP in early 2005, in protest against "the CHP's non-democratic and authoritarian system of politics." Livaneli served one term in the Turkish parliament.

During his political career, Livaneli presented a legislative proposal to amend Article 301 of the Turkish Penal Code, proposing that the concept of "Turkishness" be replaced with that of the "Turkish nation" to promote a more inclusive concept of national identity. The amendment was intended to reduce tension associated with the concept of the Turkish race.

In 2006, he presented a proposal to the National Assembly to establish a commission to investigate the reasons for increasing violence and fanaticism among youth, which was accepted.

Following his 2005 resignation from the party, Livaneli continued serving in the Grand National Assembly as an independent until the end of that term. He did not participate in the 2007 Turkish elections and has since focused on his artistic and literary work.

Livaneli has also worked as a columnist for the newspapers Sabah, Vatan, Milliyet, and Cumhuriyet.

== Films ==
Livaneli directed four feature films: Iron Earth, Copper Sky, Mist, Shahmaran, and Veda. His film Iron Earth, Copper Sky was screened in the Un Certain Regard section at the 1987 Cannes Film Festival. Veda, based on the life of Mustafa Kemal Atatürk, is the last film written and directed by Zülfü Livaneli.

Bliss, adapted from Livaneli's novel of the same name, received critical praise and was considered one of the most notable Turkish films of the decade, as well as one of the first narrative films to address honor killings. The New York Times reviewed the film as "consistently gripping" and "visually intoxicating", calling it a "landmark of contemporary Turkish cinema".

== Literature ==
After establishing his music career, Livaneli focused on writing. His first collection of short stories, A Child in Purgatory, was published in 1978 and later adapted into a film by Swedish and German TV. Livaneli's novels, such as Bliss, which won the Barnes & Noble Discovery of Great New Writers Award in 2006, and his works Serenade for Nadia, Leyla's House, and My Brother's Story, have been translated into multiple languages and received both Turkish and international literary recognition. His novels have been adapted into films, theatrical productions, and operas.

== Publications ==
- Arafat'ta Bir Çocuk (A Child in Purgatory) (1978)
- Orta Zekalılar Cenneti (The Heaven of the Mediocre) (1991)
- Diktatör ve Palyaço (The Dictator and the Clown) (1992)
- Sosyalizm Öldü mü? (Is Socialism Dead?) (1994)
- Engereğin Gözündeki Kamaşma (The Eunuch Of Constantinople) (1996)
- Bir Kedi, Bir Adam, Bir Ölüm (Memory Of Snow) (2001)
- Mutluluk (Bliss) (2002)
- Gorbaçov'la Devrim Üstüne Konuşmalar (Conversations With Gorbachov On Revolution) (2003)
- Leyla'nın Evi (Leyla's House) (2006)
- Son Ada (The Last Island) (2008)
- Sevdalim Hayat (2009)
- Sanat Uzun, Hayat Kısa (Art is Long, Life is Short) (2010)
- Serenad (Serenade for Nadia: A Novel) (2011)
- Edebiyat Mutluluktur (Literature is Bliss) (2012)
- Kardeşimin Hikayesi (My Brother's Story) (2013)
- Son Ada'nın Çocukları (Last Island's Kids) (2014)
- Konstantiniyye Oteli (Constantinople Hotel) (2015)
- Elia ile Yolculuk (2017)
- Huzursuzluk (Disquiet) (2017)
- Rüzgârlar Hep Gençtir (2019)
- Kaplanın Sırtında (2021)

== Partial discography ==
- Chants Révolutionnaires Turcs (Turkish revolutionary songs) – 1973
- Yasak Plak – 1971–1974
- Eşkıya Dünyaya Hükümdar Olmaz (Bandits Cannot Rule the World) – 1976
- Merhaba (Hello!) – 1977
- Nazım Türküsü (Nazim's Song) – 1978
- The Bus (OST) – 1978
- Alamanya Beyleri – 1979
- Atlının Türküsü (The Horseman's Song) – 1979
- Günlerimiz (Our Days) – 1980
- İnce Memet Türküsü (Thin Memet Song) – 1980
- Anadoluyum Ben (I Am An Anatolian) – 1981
- Maria Farandouri Söylüyor Zülfü Livaneli (Maria Farandouri Singing Livaneli) – 1982
- Yol (The Way) (Soundtrack) – 1983
- Eine Auswahl (A Selection) – 1983
- Ada (Island) – 1983–1984
- İstanbul Konseri (Istanbul Concert) – 1984
- Güneş Topla Benim İçin (Gather The Sun For Me) – 1986
- Livaneli / 10 Yılın Ezgisi (10 Melodies of the Year) – 1986
- Zor Yıllar (Difficult Years) – 1987
- Hoşgeldin Bebek (Welcome Baby) – 1987
- Gökyüzü Herkesindir (Sky Belongs to Everybody) – 1988
- Soundtracks – 1988
- Crossroads (New Age) – 1991
- Saat 4 Yoksun (Hour 4, You Are Not Here) – 1992
- Sevgiyle (With Love) −1994
- Neylersin – 1994
- Yangın Yeri (The Place in Fire) – 1996
- Janus (Symphonic Poems) – 1996
- Livaneli & Theodorakis : Together – 1997
- Nefesim Nefesine (My Breath to Your Breath) – 1998
- New Age Rhapsody, London Symphony Orchestra Plays Livaneli – 1998–1999
- Unutulmayanlar (Unforgettable Ones) – 1999
- İlk Türküler (First Songs) – 2001
- Hayata Dair (About Life) – 2005
- Suyun Belleği (The Memory of Water) – 2005
- Efsane Konserler (Best Concerts) – 2006
- 35. Yıl Konseri (35th Year Concert) – 2008
- "Gökkuşağı Gönder Bana" (Send me a rainbow) – 2013
- Livaneli 50. Yıl "Bir Kuşaktan Bir Kuşağa" (Livaneli 50th year – "From One Generation to Another") – 2016

== See also ==
- Category:Works by Zülfü Livaneli
