= Can Dündar =

Turkish journalist, columnist and documentarian (born 1961)

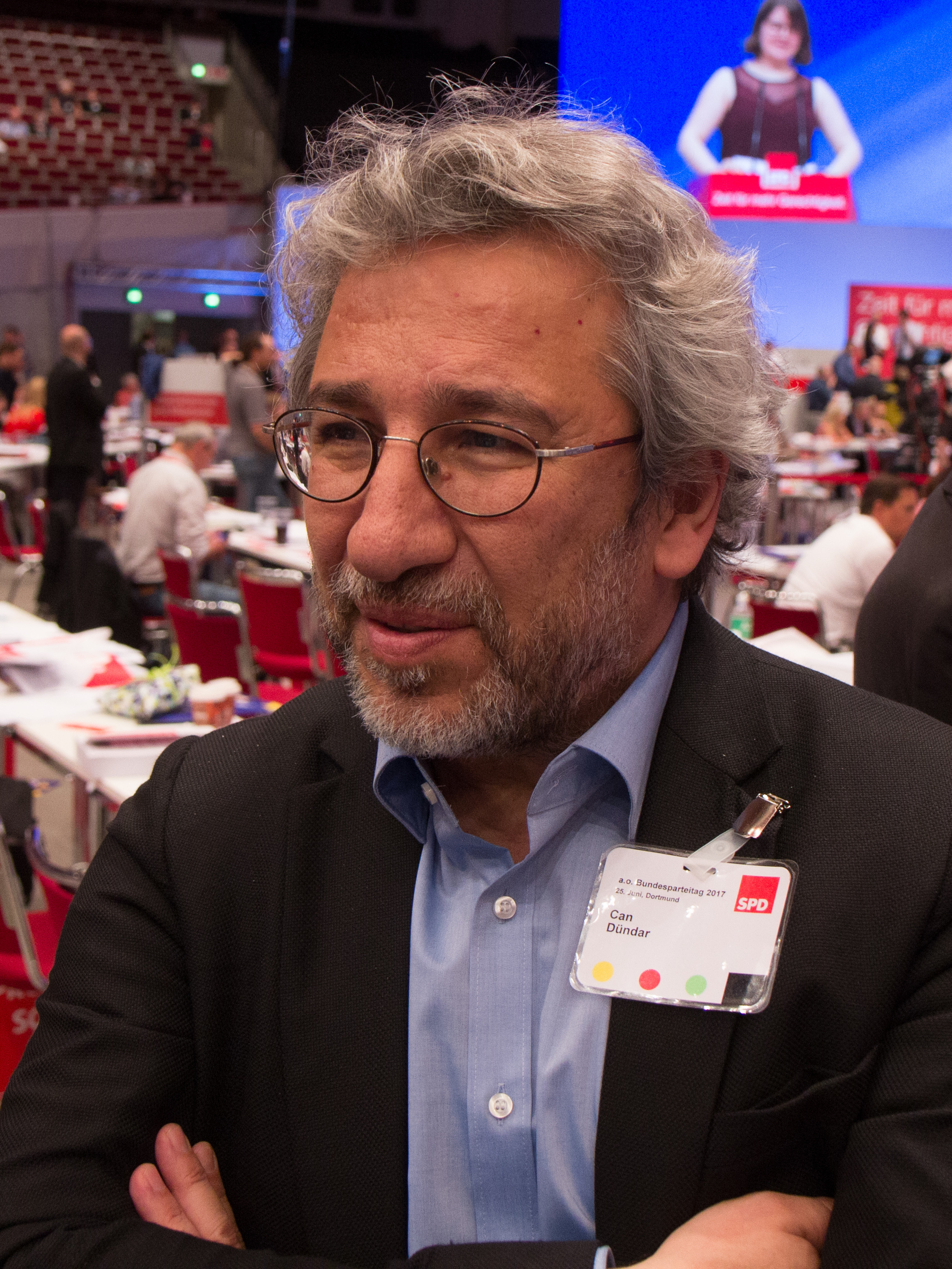
- Dündar in 2017
- Born: 16 June 1961 (age 64); Ankara, Turkey
- Education: Ankara University, Faculty of Political Science; London School of Journalism; Middle East Technical University
- Occupations: Columnist, TV host, documentarian
- Spouse: Dilek Dündar
- Children: 1

Can Dündar (Turkish pronunciation: [dʒan dynˈdaɾ], born 16 June 1961) is a Turkish journalist, columnist and documentarian. Editor-in-chief of center-left Cumhuriyet newspaper until August 2016, he was arrested in November 2015 after his newspaper published footage showing the State Intelligence MİT sending weapons to Syrian Islamist fighters.

One of the "best known" figures in Turkish media, Dündar has written for several newspapers, produced many television programs for state-owned TRT and various private channels including CNN Türk and NTV, and published more than 20 books. Dündar is the recipient of the International Press Freedom Award by the Committee to Protect Journalists. In 2016, Dündar and Erdem Gül were awarded the Prize for the Freedom and Future of the Media, by the Leipzig Media Foundation, lead partner of the European Centre for Press and Media Freedom. Since June 2016, he has lived in exile in Germany, with an arrest warrant against him in Turkey. Currently, he is editor-in-chief of #ÖZGÜRÜZ, a web radio station run by the nonprofit newsroom CORRECTIV. He is also one of the 25 leading figures on the Information and Democracy Commission launched by Reporters Without Borders.

== Early life and education ==
Dündar studied journalism at the Faculty of Political Science, Ankara University, and graduated in 1982. He continued his education at the London School of Journalism in 1986. He received his master's degree in 1988 and in 1996 earned his PhD in political science from the Middle East Technical University, Ankara. Dündar's family is of paternal Circassian and maternal Albanian origin.

== Publishing career ==
Dündar has contributed to various print publications, including Hürriyet (1983–1985), Nokta, Haftaya Bakış, Söz and Tempo. From October 1996 to June 1998 he moderated his own television show 40 Dakika (Turkish), where he discussed current themes in Turkey. It was aired weekly on Show TV with Erbil Tuşalp and Celal Kazdağlı as the editors-in-chief. He wrote for Sabah from January 1999 to April 2000 and Milliyet from January 2000. On television, he has been involved in Yanki (1979–83) and 32. Gün (1989–95) among others, including Neden? (2009).

His work often "traces Turkey’s evolution into a modern nation and provides historical and political detail regarding crucial events, debates, and conflicts." This includes profiles of historical and political figures such as Mustafa Kemal Atatürk, İsmet İnönü, Nâzım Hikmet and Vehbi Koç. His screenplay for the 2008 film Mustafa depicted the founder of the Republic of Turkey as a regular man with fears, passions and human expectations, rather than a life-size hero.

=== Conflict with the government and 2015 arrest ===
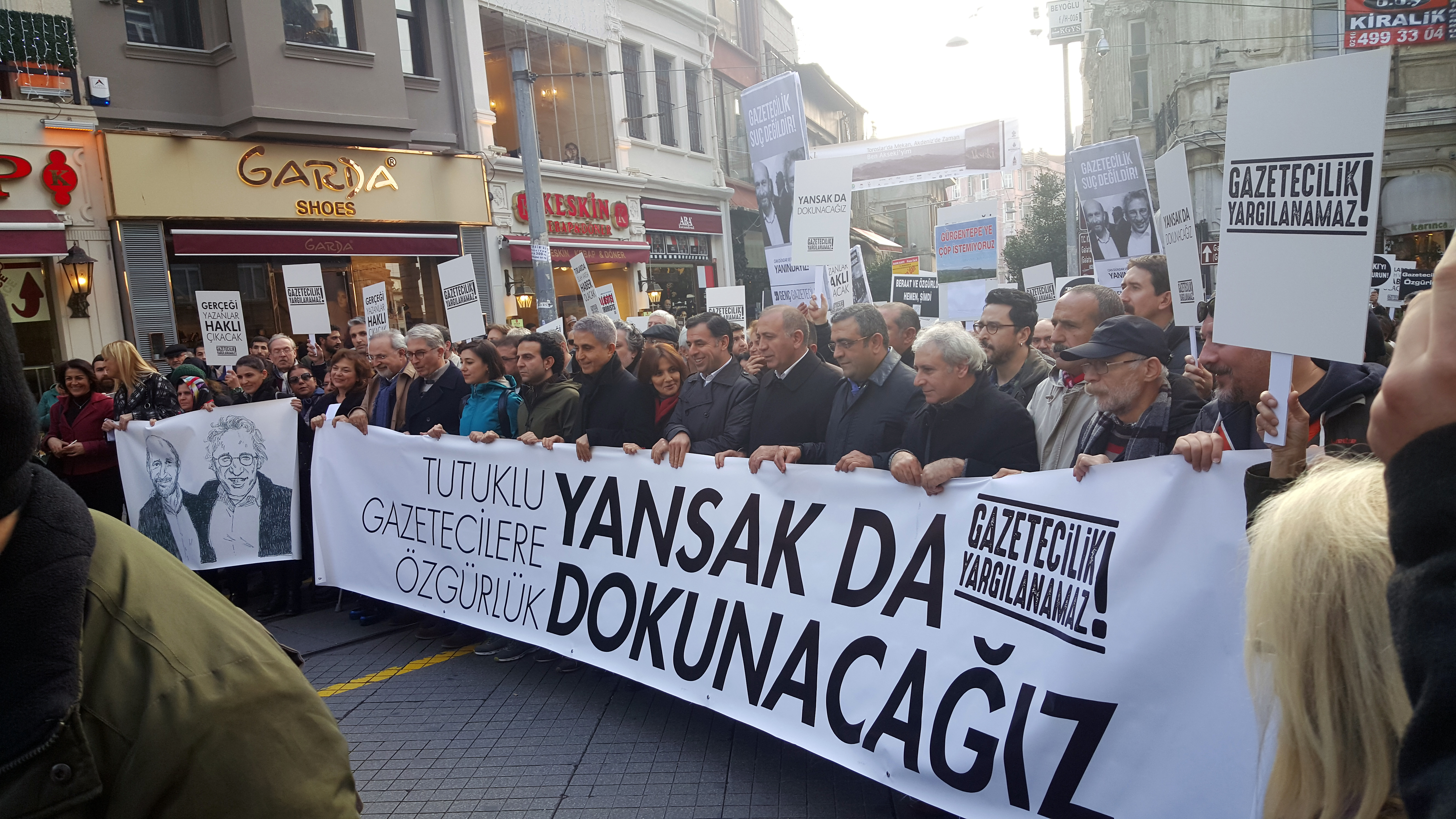
Protest in support of Can Dündar and Erdem Gül, 26 December 2015

A longstanding columnist for Milliyet, Dündar was laid off in August 2013 for "writing too sharply" about the Gezi Park protests and the developments in Egypt, as the paper's owner Erdoğan Demirören put it. Dündar recalled: "It was said to me, 'We do not wish to see stories that will displease the prime minister in this paper. Everything displeases them, and after they are displeased, they go after us'."

Subsequently, he turned to the center-left Cumhuriyet, and on 8 February 2015 became the newspaper's new editor-in-chief. In November, Cumhuriyet was awarded the 2015 Reporters Without Borders Prize for its "independent and courageous journalism."

Shortly thereafter, Dündar and Cumhuriyet's Ankara bureau chief Erdem Gül were arrested on charges of being members of a terror organization, espionage and revealing confidential documents, facing sentences of up to life imprisonment under the Anti-Terror Law of Turkey. The investigations had been launched in May, after the newspaper published photos depicting weapons transferred to Syria in trucks of the National Intelligence Organization, which became known as the 2014 MİT trucks scandal. In June 2015, Turkish President Erdoğan had publicly targeted Dündar, stating: "The individual who reported this as an exclusive story will pay a heavy price for this." In prison, Dündar was denied colored pencils to draw with but made his own paint by pressing fruit given to him in his cell, refusing the ban on color and smuggling his paintings out of prison because he "wanted to prove that color can exist even in the darkest of places."

After 92 days in prison, Dündar and Gül were released on 26 February 2016 after the Constitutional Court of Turkey decided that their detention was an "undue deprivation of liberty".

=== Assassination attempt, jail sentence and exile ===
On 6 May 2016, there was an assassination attempt witnessed by multiple reporters in front of the Istanbul courthouse where Dündar had just been defending himself against charges of treason. The assailant was stopped by Dündar's wife and a member of parliament, Muharrem Erkek, before he could fire more than two shots. Dündar was unhurt, but another journalist suffered an injury in the leg. The assailant was taken into custody by undercover police. On the same day, Dündar was sentenced to imprisonment for five years and 10 months for "leaking secret information of the state".

Dündar moved to Germany in June 2016. In August 2016, he stepped down from his position of editor-in-chief in Cumhuriyet and announced that he would continue as a columnist in the newspaper. An arrest warrant in absentia was issued in Turkey for him on 31 October 2016.

On 23 December 2020, he was sentenced in absentia to 27 years and six months in prison for espionage and aiding the armed terrorist organisation FETÖ.

== Private life ==
He is married to Dilek Dündar, and the couple have one child. His father allegedly worked for the National Intelligence Organization. He lives in Berlin, Germany. His wife was only able to join him there after three years because the authorities in Turkey had confiscated her passport. He has been forced to live with security guards because of attacks or threats by Turks living in Berlin.

== Awards and honors ==
- 2016 CPJ International Press Freedom Awards
- 2016 Oxfam Novib/PEN Award
- 2017 Best European Journalist of the Year, Prix Europa

== Documentaries ==
- Demirkırat (1991),
- 12 Mart (March 12) (1994),
- Cumhuriyetin Kraliçeleri (The Queens of the Republic) (1992),
- Sarı Zeybek (The Yellow [Blond] Zeybek) (1993)
- Gölgedekiler (The ones in the shadow) (1994–1995),
- Yükselen Bir Deniz (The Rising Sea) (1998),
- İsmet Paşa (1999),
- Devlet Tiyatroları (Government theaters) (1999),
- Köy Enstitüleri (Village Institutes) (2000),
- Halef (The Successor) (2003),
- Nazım Hikmet (2002),
- Bir Yaşam İksiri (A life potion) (2003),
- Yüzyılın Aşkları (Loves of the century) (2004),
- Karaoğlan (Black boy) (2004),
- Garip: Neset Ertas Belgeseli (Strange: The Neset Ertas Documentary) (2005),
- Mustafa (2008)
- Delikanlım İyi Bak Yıldızlara (2012)

== Books ==
- Hayata ve Siyasete Dair (About Life and Politics)),
- Yağmurdan Sonra (After the Rain),
- Ergenekon. The first book on Ergenekon.
- Yarim Haziran (My Love June),
- Benım Gençliğim (My youth),
- Köy Enstitüleri (Village Institutions),
- Yaveri Atatürk'ü Anlatıyor (Atatürk's assistant talks about him),
- Nereye? (Where to?),
- Uzaklar (Far away places),
- Yükselen Deniz (Rising Sea),
- Savaşta Ne Yaptın Baba? (What did you do in the war, father?),
- Büyülü Fener (Magic Lantern),
- Bir Yaşam İksiri (A life potion),
- Mustafa Kemal Aramızda (Mustafa Kemal is Among Us),
- Yıldızlar (The stars),
- Demirkırat,
- Sarı Zeybek (Yellow zeybek),
- Gölgedekiler (The ones in the shadow)
- İlk Türk Hititologu: Sedat Alp, (First Turkish hittitologue: Sedat Alp)
- Kırmızı Bisiklet (Red bike),
- Nazım,
- Karaoğlan (Black boy),
- Vehbi Koç,
- İsmet Paşa,
- Yüzyılın Aşkları (The loves of the century),
- Yakamdaki Yüzler (The faces on my collar),
- Ben Böyle Veda Etmeliyim (I should say goodbye like that),
- Tutuklandık (We got arrested).

== See also ==
- List of arrested journalists in Turkey
