= Meli Bendeli =

Turkish actress

- Born: Ahmet Melih Yılmaz; April 30, 1989 (age 37); Ankara, Turkey
- Occupation: Actress

Meli Bendeli (April 30 1989) is a Turkish transgender actress.

== Biography ==
Bendeli was born in 1989 in Ankara as ″Ahmet Melih Yılmaz″. She graduated from Ankara University DTCF Theater Department. She is an experienced theater actor. She was very popular with her acting performance in the theater play Woyzeck Masalı directed by Erdal Beşikçioğlu.

Bendeli, in addition to her theater works, has started to act in films and TV series since 2010. She took part in the series Hatırla Gönül in 2015, and in 2018 she started to portray the character of Timsah Celil in the TV series Çukur, but later left the series. She played the role of Şinasi in the series Cam Tavanlar, which was broadcast on Show TV and made its final in 2021. At the same time, she plays the leading role in Miriam Yasta, staged by Tatbikat Sahne, and directed by Erdal Beşikçioğlu, which premiered on 19 November 2021.

In January 2022, Bendeli came out as a transgender woman and began using she/her pronouns. Following his transition, Ahmet changed his name to Meli Bendeli. As Meli Bendeli, she continued to pursue acting roles in projects such as Dengeler (2024) and Salyangoz Odasi (2025). Bendeli was investigated for obscenity in social media posts, which she denied, and jailed in September 2026. Bendeli says she has been unable to find acting roles since undergoing gender-affirming surgery, forces her to depend on content creation for income through her personal accounts on social media platforms. She was formally arrested on obscenity charges over paid subscription content published on social media platforms. Bendeli's arrest highlights a broader trend of judicial authorities framing non-explicit material as obscene, targeting public figures, including LGBTI+s. She was released almost 2 months later.

== Filmography ==
=== Film ===
Film
Year	Title	Role
2025	Salyangoz Odası	Gece
2024	Dengeler	Hayat
2022	Horoz Dövüşü	Hazar
2021	Sıradan Bir Gün	Tolga
2021	Gölgelerin İçinde	
2021	Ali'nin Tabiatı	Musa
2021	İçimdeki Kahraman	Kahraman
2020	Yeniden Leyla	Umut
2020	Orada	Volkan
2019	Gölgeler İçinde	Ati
2018	Yuva	
2017	Körfez	Cihan
2017	Daha	Osman
2015	Abluka	
2010	Felaket	Meriç
2010	Baymin Url	Melih

=== Television ===
Television
Year	Title	Role
2021	Cam Tavanlar	Şinasi
2021	Ex Aşkım	Berke
2019–2020	Çukur	Timsah Celil
2017	Hayat Şarkısı	Cambaz
2015	Hatırla Gönül	Mete

=== Theatre ===
Year	Title	Venue	Notes
2021	Miriam Yasta	Tatbikat Sahnesi	
2020	Acting	Tatbikat Sahnesi	
2019	Hep Sonradan	Boğaziçi Performing Arts Society	
2016	Apaçi Gızlar	Mek'an	
2015	Woyzeck Masalı	Tatbikat Sahnesi	
2014	Artık Hiçbi'şii Eskisi Gibi Olmayacak Sil Gözyaşlarını	Mek'an	
-	Tevaffuk	Mek'an	
-	Kuyu	Mek'an	
-	Bernarda Alba'nın Evi	Mek'an	
-	Kadınlar, Aşklar, Şarkılar	Mek'an	
