= Dolunay Soysert =

Turkish actress (born 1973)

- Born: 25 March 1973 (age 52); Adana, Turkey
- Occupation: Actress
- Years active: 1995–present
- Spouse: Sinan Tuzcu (m. 2006; div. 2016)

Dolunay Soysert (born 25 March 1973) is a Turkish actress.

Soysert first rose to prominence with her role as Latife Hanım in the series Cumhuriyet. She had leading role in other popular series such as Benim Annem Bir Melek, Kayıp, Bebeğim, Omuz Omuza, and Başrolde Aşk. She appeared in various plays staged at Istanbul City Theatres, Dostlar Theatre, Craft Theatre, and Toy Theatre. She is also one of the founders of Istanbul Folk Theatre. For her performance on stage in an adaptation of Insignificance, she was given the Most Successful Actress award at the 9th Afife Theatre Awards. In addition to her career on stage and television, she has appeared in a number of movies. Her period roles are in Veda, Yol Ayrımı, Seddülbahir 32 Saat, Ya İstiklal Ya Ölüm, Mavi Gözlü Dev, Cumhuriyet, Kalbin Zamanı, Salkım Hanımın Taneleri, İlk Aşk, Yarım Kalan Mucize, and Muhteşem Yüzyıl.

== Life and career ==
Dolunay Soysert was born on 25 March 1973 in Adana. Her family is of Circassian descent. They moved to Ankara when she was three or four years old due to her father's job requirements. She spent her primary and middle school years in Ankara, and finished high school in Istanbul at Private Mode College.

After graduating from college, she simultaneously studied acting at the Müjdat Gezen Art Center and earned her bachelor's degree from the School of Art History and Archeology at Istanbul University. She then worked as an actress at the Istanbul City Theatres for four years. She made her debut on stage in 1995 with a role in an adaptation of Blood Wedding, which was directed by Başar Sabuncu. She later received a nomination for the Most Successful Supporting Actress award at the 1st Afife Theatre Awards for her role in Silvanlı Kadınlar, which was staged between 1996 and 1997.

Soysert made her cinematic debut with a role in Sekizinci Saat, which was directed by Cemal Gözütok. She then landed roles in comedy series such as Çılgın Bediş (1996), Kaygısızlar, and Baskül Ailesi. She subsequently moved to England and later to the United States to finish her studies. She studied drama and theatre at the University of Nebraska–Lincoln. She lived in New York City for three years and worked different jobs. Soysert received lessons on cinema and television acting at the Sally Johnson Studios.

After returning to Turkey she appeared in various stage and television productions. Notably, she appeared in the series Sultan Makamı (2003) and Omuz Omuza (2004). She portrayed the character of Derya in Bir İstanbul Masalı and played the role of Leyla in Bebeğim (2006). In the movie Mavi Gözlü Dev, which tells the life of Nâzım Hikmet, Soysert portrayed the famous poet's wife Piraye. In an adaptation of Insignificance which was staged at Dostlar Theatre, Soysert portrayed Marilyn Monroe. She also had the leading role of Ayşe in the operetta Ayşe, which went on stage at Gülriz Sururi-Engin Cezzar Theatre. For her role in Insignificance, Soysert won the Most Successful Actress award at the 9th Afife Theatre Awards.

In 2006, together with some of the Istanbul City Theatres artists, including Bahtiyar Engin, Yıldıray Şahinler, Levent Üzümcü and Kemal Kocatürk, Soysert founded the Istanbul Folk Theatre. She also took part in the community's first stage adaptation, Can Tarlası In 2006, she married actor Sinan Tuzcu. The couple divorced in 2016. In 2008, Soysert had a role in Sürmanşet, which was written by Tuzcu and staged by the Istanbul Folk Theatre and Beşiktaş Cultural Center. For her role in this play, she received a nomination for the Most Successful Actress award at the 13th Afife Theatre Awards.

In 2011, Soysert received her master's degree in advanced acting from Kadir Has University. She continued her television career by appearing in the series Benim Annem Bir Melek, Adanalı, Başrolde Aşk (2011), Muhteşem Yüzyıl (2014), and Urfalıyam Ezelden (2014). She also had roles in the movies Orada (2009), Veda (2010), Ölümden Kalma (2012), and Yarım Kalan Mucize (2012). Besides acting, Soysert also worked as an acting coach and did commercial voiceovers. She has continued her career on stage and in 2010 had a role in the play Cam which was staged by Theatre Gaga and Aysa Production Theatre, followed by Contradictions in 2015 which was staged by Craft Theatre, and the one-woman show Kul in 2018 which was an adaptation of Seray Şahiner's novel.

== Filmography ==
=== Film ===
| Year | Title | Role | Director | Notes |
|---|---|---|---|---|
| 1995 | Sekizinci Saat | Nurse Yasemin | Cemal Gözütok | |
| 1999 | Salkım Hanımın Taneleri | Gülten | Tomris Giritlioğlu | |
| 2004 | Zor Adam | Ayfer | | TV film |
| 2004 | Yürek Çığlığı | Aslı | | TV film |
| 2004 | Kalbin Zamanı | Belkıs (young) | Ali Özgentürk | |
| 2006 | Tövbe | Cavidan | | TV film |
| 2006 | İlk Aşk | Aysel | Nihat Durak | |
| 2007 | Mavi Gözlü Dev | Piraye | Biket İlhan | |
| 2009 | Orada | Neslihan Gümüş | Melik Saraçoğlu; Hakkı Kurtuluş | |
| 2010 | Veda | Zübeyde Hanım | Zülfü Livaneli | |
| 2010 | Kavşak | Güven'in eşi | Selim Demirdelen | |
| 2012 | Ölümden Kalma | Behrem | Okşan Dede | |
| 2013 | Yarım Kalan Mucize | Mualla Eyüboğlu | Biket İlhan | |
| 2016 | Kor | Zuhal | Zeki Demirkubuz | |
| 2018 | Bücür | Umut'un annesi | Umut Kırca | |
| 2022 | Masal Şatosu: Gizemli Misafir | | Burak Kuka | |
| 2022 | Hara | Melike | Atalay Taşdiken | |
| 2022 | UFO | Deniz's mother | | |
| 2022 | Kal | Hande | | |

=== Streaming series ===
| Year | Title | Role | Network | Notes |
|---|---|---|---|---|
| 1998 | Cumhuriyet | Latife Hanım | Tabii & TRT | |
| 2012 | Yol Ayrımı | | Tabii & TRT | |
| 2016 | Seddülbahir 32 Saat | Hatice Çavuş | Tabii & TRT | |
| 2017 | 7 Yüz | Gökçe | BluTV | |
| 2020 | Ya İstiklal Ya Ölüm | Halide Edib | Tabii & TRT | |
| 2021 | Terapist | Berna | GAİN | |

=== TV series ===
| Year | Title | Role | Notes |
|---|---|---|---|
| 1996 | Çılgın Bediş | Mihrace | |
| 1996–1997 | Kaygısızlar | Hostess Kaygısız | Supporting role, season 3 |
| 1997 | Baskül Ailesi | Arzum | |
| 1999 | Kuzgun | Pınar | |
| 2003–2004 | Sultan Makamı | Gülsün | Supporting role |
| 2004 | Avrupa Yakası | Melike | Guest appearance |
| 2004 | Omuz Omuza | Firdevs Alparslan | Leading role |
| 2005 | Bir İstanbul Masalı | Artist Derya | Guest appearance, episodes 56–67 |
| 2005 | Kırık Kalpler Durağı | Ayşen | |
| 2005 | Yine de Aşığım | Figen | |
| 2006 | Hacı | Şeyda Gesili | |
| 2006 | Bebeğim | Leyla Köroğlu | Leading role |
| 2008–2010 | Benim Annem Bir Melek | Ece Turuncu | Leading role |
| 2009 | Açık Mutfak | Bahar | |
| 2010 | Adanalı | Elif | Guest appearance, episodes 66–70 |
| 2011–2012 | Başrolde Aşk | Ceyda | Leading role |
| 2013–2014 | Kayıp | Leyla Şarman Özdemir | Leading role |
| 2014 | Muhteşem Yüzyıl | Gracia Mendes Nasi | Guest appearance, episodes 131–138 |
| 2014 | Urfalıyam Ezelden | Selva Bozoğlu | Leading role |
| 2015 | Son Çıkış | Jülide | Supporting role |
| 2016 | Çifte Saadet | Hülya Saadet | Leading role |
| 2016 | Kehribar | | Guest appearance |
| 2016–2017 | Bana Sevmeyi Anlat | Canan Güngör | Supporting role |
| 2017 | Kayıtdışı | Esra Ateş | Leading role |
| 2018–2019 | Elimi Bırakma | Sumru Güneş | Leading role |
| 2021 | İkimizin Sırrı | Seylan Sorgun | Supporting role |
| 2022 | Tozluyaka | Derya Öztürk | Leading role |
| 2023–2025 | Yabani | Neslihan Soysalan Aydın | Leading role |

=== TV programs ===
- Tam Kıvamında (cooking program)
- 7'den 77'ye (served as hostess in the program presented by Barış Manço)

== Theatre ==
| Year | Title | Writer | Director | Venue |
|---|---|---|---|---|
| | İki Kova Su | | | Akbank Children's Theatre |
| | Elma Dersem Çık | | | Akbank Children's Theatre |
| | İbiş'in Rüyası | Tarık Buğra | | Istanbul City Theatres |
| | Le Bourgeois gentilhomme | Molière | | Istanbul City Theatres |
| 1995 | Blood Wedding | Federico García Lorca | Başar Sabuncu | Istanbul City Theatres |
| 1996–97 | Silvanlı Kadınlar | İsmail Kaygusuz | | Istanbul City Theatres |
| 2004–05 | Insignificance | Terry Johnson | Genco Erkal | Dostlar Theatre |
| 2006 | Ayşe | Muhlis Sabahattin Ezgi; Gülriz Sururi | Engin Cezzar | Gülriz Sururi-Engin Cezzar Theatre |
| 2007 | Can Tarlası | Kemal Kocatürk | | Istanbul Folk Theatre |
| 2008 | Sürmanşet | Sinan Tuzcu | Arif Akkaya | Istanbul Folk Theatre |
| 2011 | Cam | Levent Kazak | Laçin Ceylan | Theatre Gaga; Aysa Production Theatre |
| 2012 | The Chekhov Machine | Matei Vișniec | Müge Gürman | Istanbul State Theatre |
| 2015 | Contractions | Mike Bartlett | Çağ Çalışkur | Craft Theatre |
| 2018 | Kul | Seray Şahiner | Mert Öner | Toy Theatre |
| 2019 | Le Dieu du carnage | Yasmina Reza | Celal Kadri Kınoğlu | DasDas |
| 2020 | Güneyli Bayan | Bilgesu Erenus | Rutkay Aziz | Aysa Production Theatre |

== Awards ==
| Year | Award | Category | Work | Result |
|---|---|---|---|---|
| 1997 | 1st Afife Theatre Awards | Most Successful Supporting Actress of the Year | Silvanlı Kadınlar | Nominated |
| 2004 | 12th (ÇASOD) Contemporary Film Actors Association Acting Awards | Promising Actress | | Won |
| 2005 | 9th Afife Theatre Awards | Most Successful Actress of the Year | Insignificance | Won |
| 2007 | 9th Eyüpoğlu Theatre Meeting | Best Theatre Artist of the Year | | Won |
| 2008 | 3rd Kemal Sunal Culture and Art Awards | Best Film Actress | Mavi Gözlü Dev | Won |
| 2009 | 13th Afife Theatre Awards | Most Successful Actress of the Year | Sürmanşet | Nominated |
