= Çiftçi =

Çiftçi is a Turkish surname. Notable people with the surname include:

- Batuhan Çiftçi (born 1997), Turkish amateur boxer
- Emre Çiftçi (born c. 2003), Turkish freestyle wrestler
- Hikmet Çiftçi (born 1998), Turkish footballer
- İbrahim Çiftçi (born 1997), Turkish freestyle wrestler
- Mustafa Çiftçi (born 1970), Turkish politician
- Nadir Çiftçi (born 1992), Turkish footballer
- Recep Çiftçi (born 1995), Turkish Paralympic judoka
- Serkan Çiftçi (born 1989), Austrian footballer
- Uğur Çiftçi (born 1992), Turkish footballer
- Ülkü Hilal Çiftçi (born 2009), Turkish actress and singer

== See also ==
- Çiftçi Towers, a mixed-use complex of two skyscrapers in Istanbul
