= Sümeyye Aydoğan =

Turkish actress, singer and model (born 1999)

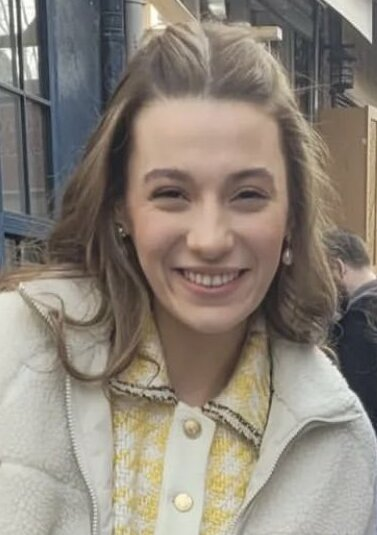
- Aydoğan in 2023
- Born: 2 April 1999 (age 27); Istanbul, Turkey
- Education: Istanbul Bilgi University
- Occupations: Actress, singer and model
- Years active: 2019–present
- Known for: Duy Beni; Dönence; Gaddar; Yeralti
- Height: 177

Sümeyye Aydoğan (born 2 April 1999) is a Turkish-Albanian actress, singer and model.

== Early life ==
Of Albanian origin, Sümeyye Aydoğan was born on 2 April 1999, in Istanbul, Turkey to a family originally from the cities of Aydın and Edirne and has been passionate about acting since primary school.

== Career ==
After completing primary and secondary school, Sümeyye Aydoğan from 2016 to 2022 continued her university education at Istanbul Bilgi University, until she obtained her acting degree. During her college years, she participated in dance competitions. She started working and collaborating for the Talento Management agency. In 2019, she released her first single titled Ellerimde Çiçekler.

In 2020, she began her acting career with the role of Diyar in the film Aile Hükümeti directed by Burak Demirdelen. In the same year, she played the role of Oya in the Netflix film Last Summer (Geçen Yaz) directed by Ozan Açıktan. In 2021 she played the role of Menekşe in the series Kahraman Babam, broadcast on Show TV. In the same year she played the role of Ceren in the Kanal D series Sadakatsiz.

In 2022 she was chosen to play the role of Melisa Gerçek in the youth series Duy Beni, which aired on Star TV. She acted alongside actors Berk Hakman, Ege Kökenli, Rabia Soytürk and Caner Topçu. In 2023 she played the role of Yağmur Elem in the Fox series Taçsız Prenses alongside İsmail Hacıoğlu. In the same year he landed the role of Gece Olgun in the Kanal D autism series Dönence, opposite actor Caner Topçu for twice. In the same year she played the role of Neriman in the tabii miniseries Akif and the role of Damla in the BluTV series Magarsus. In 2024 she played the role of Leyla in the film Hatıran Yeter directed by Ömer Faruk Yardımcı In the same year he landed the role of Aydan Güneş in the series broadcast on Fox, which later became Now Gaddar, alongside actor Çağatay Ulusoy.

== Filmography ==
=== Film ===
Year	Title	Role	Director
2020	Aile Hükümeti	Diyar	Burak Demirdelen
2020	Geçen Yaz	Oya	Ozan Açıktan
2024	Hatıran Yeter	Leyla	Ömer Faruk Yardımcı

=== Television ===
Year	Title	Role	Network	Notes
2021	Kahraman Babam	Menekşe	Show TV	8 episodes
2021	Sadakatsiz	Ceren	Kanal D	29 episodes
2022	Duy Beni	Melisa Gerçek	Star TV	20 episodes
2023	Taçsız Prenses	Yağmur Elem	Fox	10 episodes
2023	Dönence	Gece Olgun	Kanal D	14 episodes
2024	Gaddar	Aydan Güneş	Fox/Now	20 episodes
2025	Sustali Ceylan	Ceylan Bilgene	ATV	6 episodes
2026–present	Yeraltı	Sultan Hanoğlu	Now	

=== Web series ===
Year	Title	Role	Platform	Notes
2023	Akif	Neriman	tabii	13 episodes
2023	Magarsus	Damla	BluTV	8 episodes

== Discography ==
=== Singles ===
Year	Name	Artist
2019	Ellerimde Çiçekler	Sümeyye Aydoğan
