= Sinan Tuzcu =

Turkish actor (born 1977)

- Born: 10 July 1977 (age 49); Gaziantep, Turkey
- Occupations: Actor, scriptwriter
- Years active: 2003–present
- Spouse(s): Dolunay Soysert (m. 2006; div. 2016) Beyza Kapu (m. 2021)

Sinan Tuzcu (born 10 July 1977) is a Turkish actor and scriptwriter.

== Biography ==
He graduated from theatre department of Mimar Sinan Fine Arts University and Tourism Hotel Business department of Bilkent University. He worked in Arcola Theatre, London. He played in english language, in "The Net 2.0" and "Jack Hunter and the Quest for Akhenaten's Tomb".

He had a leading role in the operetta Ayşe, which was staged for the first time in 60 years. On 9 July 2006, he married actress Dolunay Soysert, with whom he shared in Ayşe, Veda, Orada, Yarım Kalan Mucize. In 2016, he and Dolunay Soysert divorced. In 2020, he again returned to stage with the play Yüzleşme, which was directed by Emre Kınay and staged at Duru Theatre.

Tuzcu first rose to prominence in 2005 with his role as Ömer in the TV series Ihlamurlar Altında and then Yol Arkadaşım. He portrayed as Mustafa Kemal Atatürk and Ali Rıza Efendi in film Veda. He portrayed as Rumi in documentary 'Mevlana Celaleddin-i Rumi: Aşkın Dansı'. He portrayed as Constantine X Doukas in series Alparslan: Büyük Selçuklu. He portrayed 'Dedo Muharrem' in Mor Menekşeler. His period roles are in Elveda Rumeli, Saruhan, Mavi Gözlü Dev, Mavera, "Kabuslar Evi: Seni Beklerken", Tanıklar. He was cast in popular series Sen Anlat Karadeniz, Son Yaz, 7 Yüz, Bir Başkadır, Arka Sokaklar, Aşk ve Ceza, İnşaat.

Tuzcu also wrote the play Sürmanşet which was staged by BKM and Istanbul Folk Theatre between 2008 and 2009. In 2014, he wrote the script for the series Urfalıyam Ezelden, which was broadcast on Kanal D and Star TV. Together with Ali Aydın, he also wrote the script for the 2016 series Kehribar, which was broadcast on ATV.

== Filmography ==
=== Film ===
Year	Title	Role	Director	Notes
2003	İnşaat	Cemal	Ömer Vargı; Tolgay Ziyal	
2005	The Net 2.0	fake policeman	Charles Winkler	
2006	Kabuslar Evi: Seni Beklerken	Ziya/Kaan	Cevdet Mercan	TV film
2007	Mavi Gözlü Dev	Yusuf	Biket İlhan	
2008	Pazar: Bir Ticaret Masalı	telephone operator	Ben Hopkins	
2008	Mevlana Celaleddin-i Rumi: Aşkın Dansı	Rumi	Kürşat Kızbaz	Documentary
2008	Jack Hunter and the Quest for Akhenaten's Tomb	Mustafa	Terry Cunningham	TV film
2008	Zahir	Sinan	Hüseyin Kaya	short film
2009	Orada	Mazhar Gümüş	Hakkı Kurtuluş; Melik Saraçoğlu	
2009	Avatar		James Cameron	Turkish dubbing
2010	Veda	Atatürk/Ali Rıza Efendi	Zülfü Livaneli	
2013	Yarım Kalan Mucize	Şefik	Biket İlhan	
2016	Saruhan	Janissary ağa Arif	Emre Konuk	TV filmi
2023	49	Ebu Ferec	Hakan İnan	
2024	Hayatla Barış	Faik Hoca		
2026	Bazı Aşklar Yarım Kalır			

=== Web series ===
Year	Title	Role	Notes
2017	7 Yüz	Mete	guest appearance
2020	Bir Başkadır		guest appearance

=== TV series ===
Year	Title	Role	Notes
2005–07	Ihlamurlar Altında	Ömer Tekiner	leading role
2008	Çemberin Dışında	Cesur Akıncı	leading role
2008	Elveda Rumeli	Kadı Efendi	episodes 23–41
2008–09	Yol Arkadaşım	Sertaç Aydeniz	leading role
2009	Adanalı	robber	guest
2009	Altın Kızlar	Yusuf	guest
2009	Nefes	Göksenin	
2010–11	Aşk ve Ceza	Hakan	season 2
2011–12	Mor Menekşeler	Dedo	
2012	Babalar ve Evlatlar	Yılmaz	
2013	Görüş Günü Kadınları	Mehmet	
2013–14	Aşk Ekmek Hayaller	Ferit	
2014	Tanıklar		Guest
2015	Kaderimin Yazıldığı Gün	Soner	episodes 45–50
2016	Babam ve Ailesi	Tamer	Guest
2016–17	Arka Sokaklar	Oktay Ocak	episodes 408-437
2018–19	Sen Anlat Karadeniz	Mustafa Kaleli	
2021	Mavera	Atıf	
2021	Son Yaz	Metin Yaman	season 1, supporting role
2021–22	Alparslan: Büyük Selçuklu	Constantine X Doukas	episodes 1–24
2022–2023	Sipahi	Goran Losic	
2024	Bir Sevdadır	Ali İhsan Bıçakçı	
2025	Kuruluş: Osman	Commander Kuçar	
2026	A.B.İ.	Sinan Hancıoğlu	
2026	İki Destan Bir Vatan	Gürkan	

=== Screenwriter ===
Year	Title	Notes
2014	Emanet	
2014	Urfalıyam Ezelden	
2016	Kehribar	
