= The Blue-Eyed Giant =

Mavi Gözlü Dev
- Directed by: Biket İlhan
- Written by: Biket İlhan; Nihan Belgin; Selay Tozkoparan Oğuz
- Music by: Cem İdiz
- Production company: Sinevizyon Film
- Release date: 2007
- Country: Turkey

The Blue-Eyed Giant (Turkish title: Mavi Gözlü Dev) is a 2007 biographical film about the period when poet Nazim Hikmet spent in Bursa Prison after 1941. The film was directed by Biket Ilhan, who played the famous poet Yetkin Dikinciler. The filming of the film, which received 175.000 TL support from the Ministry of Culture and Tourism, took place on the set of the prison established by the art director Mustafa Zia Ülkenciler in Beykoz. The script of the film, which went down in the history of world cinema as the first film about the life of Nazim Hikmet, was rewritten and completed eight times in a period of more than four years. Cem Idiz, who composed the music for the film, also composed Hikmet's poem "Invitation", and this composition was interpreted by Onur Şentürk. The title of the film was compiled from the poem "Blue-Eyed Giant, Tiny Woman and Honeysuckles" by Nazim Hikmet.

With 228,295 box office admissions, it is the fifth most attended film by a female director in Turkey from 2004 to 2013.

== Cast ==
Cast	Role
Yetkin Dikinciler	Nazım Hikmet Ran
Dolunay Soysert	Piraye
Özge Özberk	Münevver
Uğur Polat	Tahsin Bey
Sinan Tuzcu	Yusuf
Nil Günal	Samiye
Rıza Sönmez	Orhan Kemal
Ferit Kaya	Balaban
Nihan Belgin	Suzan
Bülent Emrah Parlak	Police
Suna Keskin	Celile
Hakan Gerçek	Kanbur Kerim
Nihat İleri	Hasan
Devrim Nas	Nurullah
Zühtü Erkan	Bekir
