= The Love Song of J. Alfred Prufrock =

1915 poem by T. S. Eliot

- by T. S. Eliot
- Cover page of The Egoist Ltd's publication of Prufrock and Other Observations (1917)
- Original title: Prufrock Among the Women
- First published in: June 1915 issue of Poetry
- Country: United States
- Language: English
- Publisher: magazine (1915): Harriet Monroe chapbook (1917): The Egoist Ltd (London)
- Lines: 140
- Pages: 6 (1915 printing); 8 (1917 printing)

Full text
- The Love Song of J. Alfred Prufrock at Wikisource

"The Love Song of J. Alfred Prufrock" is the first professionally published poem by the American-born British poet T. S. Eliot (1888–1965). It relates the varying thoughts of its title character in a stream of consciousness. Eliot began writing it in February 1910, and it was first published in the June 1915 issue of Poetry: A Magazine of Verse at the instigation of his fellow American expatriate the poet Ezra Pound. It was later printed as part of a twelve-poem chapbook entitled Prufrock and Other Observations in 1917. At the time of its publication, the poem was considered outlandish, but it is now seen as heralding a paradigmatic shift in poetry from late-19th-century Romanticism and Georgian lyrics to Modernism.

Its structure was heavily influenced by Eliot's extensive reading of Dante Alighieri and makes several references to the Bible and other literary works – including William Shakespeare's plays Henry IV Part II, Twelfth Night and Hamlet; the works of Andrew Marvell, a 17th-century metaphysical poet; and the 19th-century French Symbolists. Eliot narrates the experience of Prufrock using the stream of consciousness technique developed by his fellow Modernist writers. The poem, described as a "drama of literary anguish", is a dramatic interior monologue of an urban man stricken with feelings of isolation and an incapability for decisive action that is said "to epitomize [the] frustration and impotence of the modern individual" and "represent thwarted desires and modern disillusionment".

Prufrock laments his physical and intellectual inertia, the lost opportunities in his life, and lack of spiritual progress, and is haunted by reminders of unattained carnal love. With visceral feelings of weariness, regret, embarrassment, longing, emasculation, sexual frustration, a sense of decay and an awareness of ageing and mortality, the poem has become one of the most recognised works in modern literature.

== Composition and publication history ==
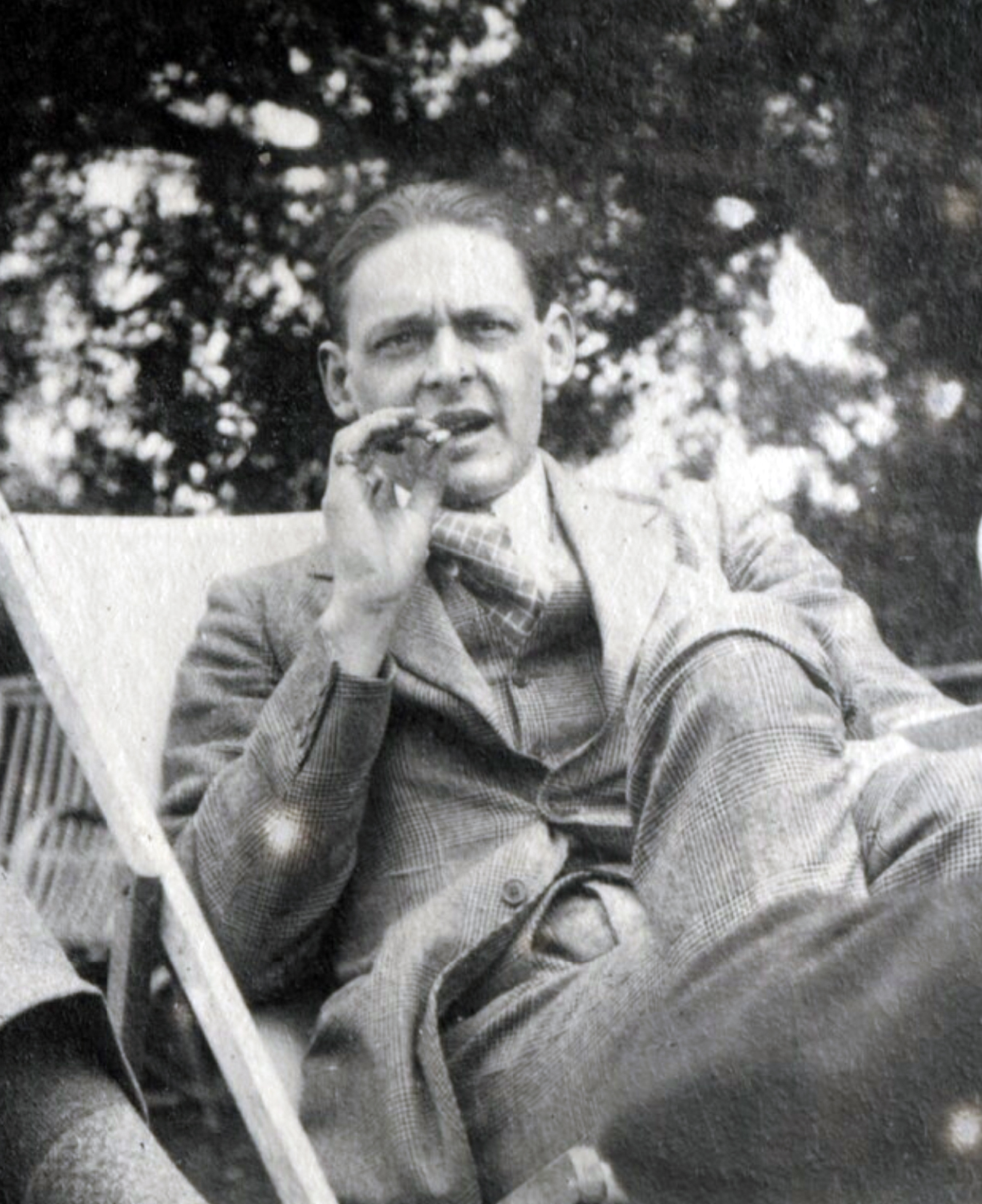
T. S. Eliot in 1923, photographed by Lady Ottoline Morrell

=== Writing and first publication ===
Eliot wrote "The Love Song of J. Alfred Prufrock" between February 1910 and July or August 1911. Shortly after arriving in England to attend Merton College, Oxford, in 1914, Eliot was introduced to the American expatriate poet Ezra Pound, who instantaneously deemed Eliot "worth watching" and aided the start of his career. Pound served as the overseas editor of Poetry: A Magazine of Verse and recommended to the magazine's founder, Harriet Monroe, that Poetry should publish "The Love Song of J. Alfred Prufrock", extolling Eliot and stating that his work embodied a new and unique phenomenon among contemporary writers. Pound claimed that Eliot "has actually trained himself AND modernized himself on his own. The rest of the promising young have done one or the other, but never both." The poem was first published by the magazine in its June 1915 issue.

In November 1915 "The Love Song of J. Alfred Prufrock" – along with Eliot's poems "Portrait of a Lady", "The Boston Evening Transcript", "Hysteria", and "Miss Helen Slingsby" – was included in Catholic Anthology 1914–1915 edited by Ezra Pound and printed by Elkin Mathews in London. In June 1917 The Egoist Ltd, a small publishing firm run by Dora Marsden, published a pamphlet entitled Prufrock and Other Observations (London), containing 12 poems by Eliot. "The Love Song of J. Alfred Prufrock" was the first in the volume. Eliot was appointed assistant editor of The Egoist periodical in June 1917.

=== Prufrock's Pervigilium ===
According to Eliot's biographer Lyndall Gordon, while he was writing the first drafts of "The Love Song of J. Alfred Prufrock" in his notebook in 1910–1911, he intentionally kept four pages blank in the middle section of the poem. According to the notebooks, now in the collection of the New York Public Library, Eliot finished the poem, which was originally published sometime in July and August 1911, when he was 22 years old. In 1912 he revised the poem and included a 38-line section now called "Prufrock's Pervigilium" which was inserted on those blank pages, and intended as a middle section for the poem. However, Eliot removed this section soon after seeking the advice of his fellow Harvard acquaintance and poet Conrad Aiken. This section would not be included in the original publication of Eliot's poem but was included when published posthumously in the 1996 collection of Eliot's early, unpublished drafts in Inventions of the March Hare: Poems 1909–1917. This Pervigilium section describes the "vigil" of Prufrock through an evening and night described by one reviewer as an "erotic foray into the narrow streets of a social and emotional underworld" that portray "in clammy detail Prufrock's tramping 'through certain half-deserted streets' and the context of his 'muttering retreats / Of restless nights in one-night cheap hotels.'"

=== Critical reception ===
Critical publications initially dismissed the poem. An unsigned review in The Times Literary Supplement from 1917 found: "The fact that these things occurred to the mind of Mr. Eliot is surely of the very smallest importance to anyone – even to himself. They certainly have no relation to 'poetry,' [...]." Another unsigned review from the same year imagined Eliot saying "I'll just put down the first thing that comes into my head, and call it 'The Love Song of J. Alfred Prufrock.'"

The Harvard Vocarium at Harvard College recorded Eliot's reading of Prufrock and other poems in 1947, as part of its ongoing series of poetry readings by its authors.

== Description ==
=== Title ===
In his early drafts, Eliot gave the poem the subtitle "Prufrock among the Women." This subtitle was apparently discarded before publication. Eliot called the poem a "love song" in reference to Rudyard Kipling's poem "The Love Song of Har Dyal", first published in Kipling's collection Plain Tales from the Hills (1888). In 1959, Eliot addressed a meeting of the Kipling Society and discussed the influence of Kipling upon his own poetry:

Traces of Kipling appear in my own mature verse where no diligent scholarly sleuth has yet observed them, but which I am myself prepared to disclose. I once wrote a poem called "The Love Song of J. Alfred Prufrock": I am convinced that it would never have been called "Love Song" but for a title of Kipling's that stuck obstinately in my head: "The Love Song of Har Dyal".

However, the origin of the name Prufrock is not certain, and Eliot never remarked on its origin other than to claim he was unsure of how he came upon the name. Many scholars and indeed Eliot himself have pointed towards the autobiographical elements in the character of Prufrock, and Eliot at the time of writing the poem was in the habit of rendering his name as "T. Stearns Eliot", very similar in form to that of J. Alfred Prufrock. It is suggested that the name "Prufrock" came from Eliot's youth in St. Louis in the United States, where the Prufrock-Litton Company, a large furniture store, occupied one city block downtown at 420–422 North Fourth Street. In a letter in 1950 Eliot said: "I did not have, at the time of writing the poem, and have not yet recovered, any recollection of having acquired this name in any way, but I think that it must be assumed that I did, and that the memory has been obliterated."

=== Epigraph ===
The draft version of the poem's epigraph comes from Dante's Purgatorio (XXVI, 147–148):

'sovegna vos a temps de ma dolor'.
Poi s'ascose nel foco che gli affina.

Translation:

'be mindful in due time of my pain'.
Then dived he back into that fire which refines them.

He finally decided not to use this, but eventually used the quotation in the closing lines of his 1922 poem The Waste Land. The quotation that Eliot did choose comes from Dante also. Inferno (XXVII, 61–66) reads:

S'io credesse che mia risposta fosse
A persona che mai tornasse al mondo,
Questa fiamma staria senza piu scosse.
Ma perciocchè giammai di questo fondo
Non tornò vivo alcun, s'i'odo il vero,
Senza tema d'infamia ti rispondo.

Translation:

If I but thought that my response were made
to one perhaps returning to the world,
this tongue of flame would cease to flicker.
But since, up from these depths, no one has yet
returned alive, if what I hear is true,
I answer without fear of being shamed.

In context, the epigraph refers to a meeting between Dante Alighieri and Guido da Montefeltro, who was condemned to the eighth circle of Hell for providing counsel to Pope Boniface VIII, who wished to use Guido's advice for a nefarious undertaking. This encounter follows Dante's meeting with Odysseus, who himself is also condemned to the circle of the Fraudulent. According to Ron Banerjee, the epigraph serves to cast ironic light on Prufrock's intent. Like Guido, Prufrock had never intended his story to be told, and so by quoting Guido, Eliot reveals his view of Prufrock's love song.

Frederick Locke contends that Prufrock himself is suffering from a split personality, and that he embodies both Guido and Dante in the Inferno analogy. One is the storyteller; the other the listener who later reveals the story to the world. He posits, alternatively, that the role of Guido in the analogy is indeed filled by Prufrock, but that the role of Dante is filled by the reader ("Let us go then, you and I"). In that, the reader is granted the power to do as he pleases with Prufrock's love song.

=== Themes and interpretation ===
Since the poem is concerned primarily with the irregular musings of the narrator, it can be difficult to interpret. Laurence Perrine wrote that "[the poem] presents the apparently random thoughts going through a person's head within a certain time interval, in which the transitional links are psychological rather than logical". This stylistic choice makes it difficult to determine what in the poem is literal and what is symbolic. On the surface, "The Love Song of J. Alfred Prufrock" relays the thoughts of a sexually frustrated middle-aged man who wants to say something but is afraid to do so, and ultimately does not. The dispute, however, lies in to whom Prufrock is speaking, whether he is actually going anywhere, what he wants to say, and to what the various images refer.

The intended audience is not evident. Some believe that Prufrock is talking to another person or directly to the reader, while others believe Prufrock's monologue is internal. Perrine writes "The 'you and I' of the first line are divided parts of Prufrock's own nature", while the poetry critic Mutlu Konuk Blasing suggested that the "you and I" refers to the relationship between the dilemmas of the character and the author. Similarly, critics dispute whether Prufrock is going somewhere during the course of the poem. In the first half of the poem, Prufrock uses various outdoor images and talks about how there will be time for various things before "the taking of a toast and tea", and "time to turn back and descend the stair." This has led many to believe that Prufrock is on his way to an afternoon tea, where he is preparing to ask this "overwhelming question". Others, however, believe that Prufrock is not physically going anywhere, but instead is imagining it in his mind.

Perhaps the most significant dispute lies over the "overwhelming question" that Prufrock is trying to ask. Many believe that Prufrock is trying to tell a woman of his romantic interest in her, pointing to the various images of women's arms and clothing and the final few lines in which Prufrock laments that mermaids will not sing to him. Others, however, believe that Prufrock is trying to express some deeper philosophical insight or disillusionment with society, but fears rejection, pointing to statements that express a disillusionment with society, such as "I have measured out my life with coffee spoons" (line 51). Many believe that the poem is a criticism of Edwardian society and Prufrock's dilemma represents the inability to live a meaningful existence in the modern world. McCoy and Harlan wrote, "For many readers in the 1920s, Prufrock seemed to epitomize the frustration and impotence of the modern individual. He seemed to represent thwarted desires and modern disillusionment."

In general, Eliot uses imagery of ageing and decay to represent Prufrock's self-image. For example, "When the evening is spread out against the sky / Like a patient etherized upon a table" (lines 2–3), the "sawdust restaurants" and "cheap hotels", the yellow fog, and the afternoon "Asleep...tired... or it malingers" (line 77), are reminiscent of languor and decay, while Prufrock's various concerns about his hair and teeth, as well as the mermaids "Combing the white hair of the waves blown back / When the wind blows the water white and black," show his concern over ageing.

=== Use of allusion ===
Like many of Eliot's poems, "The Love Song of J. Alfred Prufrock" makes numerous allusions to other works, which are often symbolic themselves.

- In "Time for all the works and days of hands" (29) Works and Days is the title of a long poem – a description of agricultural life and a call to toil – by the early Greek poet Hesiod.
- "I know the voices dying with a dying fall" (52) echoes Orsino's first lines in William Shakespeare's play Twelfth Night.
- The prophet of "Though I have seen my head (grown slightly bald) brought in upon a platter / I am no prophet – and here's no great matter" (81–2) is John the Baptist, whose head was delivered to Salome by Herod Antipas as a reward for her dancing (Matthew 14:1–11, and Oscar Wilde's play Salome).
- "To have squeezed the universe into a ball" (92) and "indeed there will be time" (23) echo the closing lines of Andrew Marvell's poem "To His Coy Mistress". Other phrases such as, "there will be time" and "there is time" are reminiscent of the opening line of that poem: "Had we but world enough and time".
- "'I am Lazarus, come from the dead'" (94) may be either the beggar Lazarus (of Luke 16) returning on behalf of the rich man who was not permitted to return from the dead, to warn the rich man's brothers about Hell, or the Lazarus (of John 11) whom Jesus raised from the dead, or both.
- "Full of high sentence" (117) echoes Geoffrey Chaucer's description of the Clerk of Oxford in the General Prologue to The Canterbury Tales.
- "There will be time to murder and create" is a biblical allusion to Ecclesiastes 3.
- In the final section of the poem, Prufrock rejects the idea that he is Prince Hamlet, suggesting that he is merely "an attendant lord" (112) whose purpose is to "advise the prince" (114), a likely allusion to Polonius – Polonius being also "almost, at times, the Fool."
- "Among some talk of you and me" may be a reference to Quatrain 32 of Edward FitzGerald's translation of the Rubaiyat of Omar Khayyam ("There was a Door to which I found no Key / There was a Veil past which I could not see / Some little Talk awhile of Me and Thee / There seemed – and then no more of Thee and Me.")
- "I have heard the mermaids singing, each to each" has been suggested transiently to be a poetic allusion to John Donne's "Song: Go and catch a falling star" or Gérard de Nerval's "El Desdichado", and this discussion used to illustrate and explore the intentional fallacy and the place of poet's intention in critical inquiry.

== See also ==
- "The Love Song of J. Alfred Prufrock" in popular culture
