= Tozluyaka =

Turkish television series

- Genre: Drama; Youth
- Screenplay by: Yekta Torun
- Directed by: Semih Bağcı
- Starring: Emre Kınay; Dolunay Soysert; Tayanç Ayaydın
- Composers: Berkay Şenol; Tuna Velibaşoğlu
- Country of origin: Turkey
- Original language: Turkish
- No. of seasons: 1
- No. of episodes: 26

Production
- Producers: Fatih Aksoy; Mehmet Yiğit Alp
- Production location: Istanbul
- Camera setup: Single-camera
- Running time: 120 minute
- Production company: NTC Media

Original release
- Network: FOX
- Release: 27 June – 25 December 2022

Tozluyaka is a Turkish television series, the first episode of which was broadcast on 27 June 2022, shot by NTC Media. Emre Kınay, Dolunay Soysert and Tayanç Ayaydın are in the lead roles in the series.

== Cast and characters ==
Actor	Character	Episode
Emre Kınay	Kenan Yağızoğlu	1-26
Dolunay Soysert	Derya Öztürk	1-26
Tayanç Ayaydın	Önder Koçak	1-26
Kaan Mirac Sezen	Ali Öztürk (Yangın Ali)	1-26
Ecem Çalhan	Cemre Yılmaz	1-17, 19
Ulvi Kahyaoğlu	Berk Yağızoğlu	1-26
Çağla Şimşek	Hazal Küçük	1-26
Can Bartu Aslan	Sinan Narinses (Arap)	1-26
Serra Pirinç	Zeynep Sarı (Zeyno)	1-26
Nur Yazar	Kader Sarı	1-26
Nebil Sayın	Vedat Narinses	1-26
Kadim Yaşar	Osman Akın	1-26
Özgür Foster	Ege Şimşek	1-26
Ahmet Haktan Zavlak	Çağrı Koçak	1-26
Duygu Özşen	Ayla Yilmaz	1-26
Oğulcan Arman Uslu	Bilal Narinses	1-26
Durukan Çelikkaya	Vefa Akın	1-13
Doğa Lara Akkaya	Duru	1-26
Egemen Almacı	Verde	1-26
Begüm Birgören	Nesrin	3-26
Sude Zülal Güler	Mavi	11-26

== Episodes ==
=== Season 1 (2022-) ===
Episode	Director	Scenarist	Release date	Rating (TOTAL)	Rank (TOTAL)	Rating (AB)	Rank (AB)	Rating (ABC1)	Rank (ABC1)
Episode 1	Semih Bağcı	Yekta Torun	27 June 2022	3,42	3.	3,69	3.	3,80	3.
Episode 2	Semih Bağcı	Yekta Torun	4 July 2022	4,37	1.	4,12	1.	4,12	2.
Episode 3	Semih Bağcı	Yekta Torun	18 July 2022	5,01	1.	3,46	2.	3,90	2.
Episode 4	Semih Bağcı	Yekta Torun	25 July 2022	4,71	1.	3,68	2.	3,83	2.
Episode 5	Semih Bağcı	Yekta Torun	1 August 2022	5,33	1.	3,97	2.	3,87	2.
	Semih Bağcı	Yekta Torun	4,65						
