= Hayat Şarkısı =

- Also known as: Song of Life
- Genre: Romance; Drama
- Screenplay by: Mahinur Ergun
- Directed by: Cem Karcı
- Starring: Burcu Biricik; Birkan Sokullu; Tayanç Ayaydın; Ecem Özkaya; Ahmet Mümtaz Taylan; Seray Gözler; Deniz Hamzaoğlu; Pelin Öztekin
- Country of origin: Turkey
- Original language: Turkish
- No. of seasons: 2
- No. of episodes: 57

Production
- Producer: Gül Oğuz
- Production locations: Istanbul, Turkey
- Running time: 120 minutes
- Production company: Most Production

Original release
- Network: Kanal D
- Release: February 9, 2016 – June 6, 2017

Hayat Şarkısı (English title: Song of Life) is a Turkish romantic drama television series, starring Burcu Biricik, Birkan Sokullu, Tayanç Ayaydın, Ecem Özkaya, Ahmet Mümtaz Taylan and Seray Gözler. It premiered on Kanal D on February 9, 2016 and concluded on June 6, 2017. The drama is the Turkish remake of the Korean Flames of Desire.

== Synopsis ==
Born and raised in Işıklar Village near Mudanya, Bayram and his only friend Salih, who was his blood brother while growing up, engage their children Melek and Kerim at a young age in order to bind a conflict between them sweetly, and they continue to live in different cities until the children grow up and reach the age of marriage.

Having two children, Bayram does not forget his promise, even though he developed his business in Istanbul where he settled with his family and made a great fortune. He takes his young son Kerim with him on the day he graduated from university and knocks on the door of Salih, who lives with his two daughters, Hülya and Melek in Işıklar Village. Salih is also loyal to his promise and they finalize the wedding decision of the children with the arrival of Bayram. However, the children of both families have established a life of their own over the past years and have turned towards different loves and goals. Although young people make decisions about this compulsory marriage among themselves and relax with the solutions they find; Hulya's plans, which they did not take into account at all, have already been put into effect.

== Cast ==
- Burcu Biricik as Hülya Çamoğlu Cevher
- Birkan Sokullu as Kerim Cevher
- Tayanç Ayaydın as Hüseyin Cevher
- Ecem Özkaya as Melek Çamoğlu Cevher
- Ahmet Mümtaz Taylan as Bayram Cevher
- Seray Gözler as Süheyla Cevher
- Deniz Hamzaoğlu as Kaya
- Pelin Öztekin as Zeynep Namıkoğlu
- Olgun Toker as Mahir Duru
- Almila Bağrıaçık as Filiz Namlı
- Aydan Taş as Nilay
- Recep Güneysu as Cem Darende
- Ahmet Melih Yılmaz as Cambaz
