= Dönence =

- Genre: Romance; Drama
- Written by: S.A yazı Grubu, Nuray Uslu; Banu Yılmaz; Hamza Akyıldız; Ebru Hacıoğlu; İbrahim Güler; Melek Ordu
- Directed by: Serdar Gözelekli
- Starring: Emre Kınay; Caner Topçu; Sümeyye Aydoğan; Atakan Hoşgören
- Composers: JingleTV
- Country of origin: Turkey
- Original language: Turkish
- No. of seasons: 1
- No. of episodes: 14

Production
- Producer: Ali Cengiz Deveci
- Production locations: Istanbul, İzmir
- Running time: 120 minutes
- Production company: D Media

Original release
- Network: Kanal D
- Release: 4 July – 11 October 2023

Dönence (translated title: The Tropical) is a Turkish television series based on the 2022 Israeli TV series Exceptional. The series is produced by D Media, falls under the genres of youth, romance, and drama. It is directed by Serdar Gözelekli and features a screenplay written by Nuray Uslu, Banu Yılmaz, Hamza Akyıldız, Ebru Hacıoğlu, İbrahim Güler, and Melek Ordu. The series is adapted from the Israeli TV series Exceptional. The lead roles in the show are played by Emre Kınay, Caner Topçu, Sümeyye Aydoğan, and Atakan Hoşgören. The series is scheduled for premier, with its first episode aired on July 4, 2023.

== Plot ==
Throughout the summer, Gece makes plans to attend university and play music with her boyfriend, Emir, in Istanbul. However, all her dreams are put on hold when her family suddenly decides to leave the city and move to Foça due to the special condition of Gece's sister, Gülce. Gülce has Asperger's Syndrome and finds it challenging to cope with the crowded and bustling environment of Istanbul.

In Foça, Gece meets Özgür, a handsome instructor at the Surf club where Gülce is enrolled. Özgür has dedicated his life to taking care of his brother, Rüzgar, who also has Asperger's Syndrome, triggered by the tragic loss of their parents in a fire accident. As Gece and Özgür grow closer, Gece learns to perceive life from a more mature perspective, while Özgür realizes that life is too short to be postponed. The unexpected arrival of Emir in Foça brings new obstacles into Gece's life.

== Filming location ==
Dönence was filmed in Istanbul, and İzmir, Turkey. The series showcases various iconic locations in Istanbul and İzmir, including university and the beaches of İzmir, where vibrant scenery have been captured.

== Cast and characters ==
Actor	Character
Caner Topçu	Özgür
Sümeyye Aydoğan	Gece
Emre Kınay	Cem
Atakan Hoşgören	Emir
Didem İnselel	Verda
Ogün Kaptanoğlu	Harun
Ülkü Hilal Çiftçi	Gülce
Ahmet Varlı	
Doğa Karakaş	Rüzgar
Nazlı Çetin	Sera
Şebnem Doğruer	Fatma baba
Alara Bozbey	
Mesut Yılmaz	
Edanur Gülbudak	Zarife
Muammer Tali	Fikret
Umut Kaya	
Berfin Ant	Ceren

== Overview ==
Season 1 Ongoing Status
Number of Episodes	8
Start Date	4 July 2023
End Date	—
Channel	Kanal D
