= Patrick Graham (journalist) =

Canadian journalist

Patrick Graham is a Canadian journalist and screenwriter best known for his coverage of the Iraq War. For many years he was associated with the National Post, but his work has appeared in a variety of print outlets, including The Guardian, The Observer, The Globe and Mail, The Walrus, and Harper's Magazine. A memoir relating to his experience of the Libyan Revolution and the Arab Spring, The Man who went to War, appeared in 2012.

The 2011 film Afghan Luke is based on his work, and he developed the story and co-wrote the script for this film. He also co-produced and co-wrote the 2022 film Horoz Dövüşü (Game Birds). More recently he created and performed in Beyond Fallujah, a one-man play presented in early 2026 by the Calgary-based theatre company One Yellow Rabbit.

In 2016 he was admitted honoris causa to the degree of Doctor Civilis Legis (DCL) of the University of King's College in Halifax.
