= İbrahim Balaban =

Turkish painter (1921–2019)

- Born: 1 January 1921; Seçköy, Osmangazi, Bursa, Turkey
- Died: 9 June 2019 (aged 98); Istanbul, Turkey
- Known for: Painter
- Website: www.ressambalaban.com/black/index.html#/home

İbrahim Balaban (1 January 1921 – 9 June 2019) was a Turkish painter.

== Early years and private life ==
He was born at Seçköy village of Osmangazi district in Bursa Province in 1921. His parents did not allow him to pursue further education after he completed the only three-grade primary school in the village. Balaban protested his parents' decision by refusing to work. He kept himself busy with writing and drawing until the age of 15.

In 1937 at the age of 16, Balaban was sentenced to six months in Bursa Prison and payment of a fine for growing cannabis, a crime he allegedly did not commit. His sentence was increased to three years in prison because he was unable to pay the fine. He worked in the prison as a barber to earn money. After serving his first prison term, he was convicted a second time on the charge of murdering a former fellow inmate, who was his accomplice from his alleged first conviction as well as a rival in love for his first wife, Fadime. Balaban was sent to the prison island İmralı, where he served until 1947. He was then transferred back to Bursa Prison. In 1950, Balaban was released through a general amnesty. Following the 1960 Turkish coup d'état, he was jailed for six months during the military junta rule in 1961, this time for the political character of his paintings.

Balaban had two sons and a daughter. His elder son, Hasan Nazım Balaban, is also a painter.

== Artistic career ==
In his childhood, Balaban used to produce figure drawings of his father and grandfather at farming, peasants at weddings and festivals, children, and oxen. He depicted landscape art of fields, gardens, crops, and village scenes.

During his time at Bursa Prison, he met Turkish poet Nâzım Hikmet Ran, who was serving a ten-year sentence for the political content of his poetry. Hikmet, who used to paint in the prison, discovered Balaban's talent and gave all his paint and brushes to him, encouraging Balaban to continue with painting. During the prison years, Balaban was influenced by Hikmet, 20 years his senior, whom he called the "Poet Father" (Turkish: Şair Baba). Hikmet helped Balaban to form his own ideas in the fields of philosophy, sociology, economics, and politics. In a letter to the novelist Kemal Tahir, Hikmet wrote about his admiration for Balaban, calling him "my peasant painter" (Turkish: Köylü ressam). They stayed in contact with each other after they were released.

Following his release from prison in 1950, Balaban spent two years in Istanbul, where he opened his first personal exhibition in 1953. Early in his career, Balaban encountered fierce criticism from established art circle, which consisted of formally educated artists and critics. Their reactions were often derisory and bordered on a classist tendency, on the basis that an uneducated peasant had no place in Turkish art. Nevertheless, he has presented more than 2,000 pieces in more than 50 expositions to date. He is also the author of 11 books.

He is known for his realistic motifs. He describes himself as follows:

I am an artist painting scenes of people from within Turkish daily life. Why scenes of people? Because I've always observed the lives and the lifestyles of people and placed these observations in my memory, and then conveyed the observations in my memories to paper, to compositions and then to canvas. I've been making paintings of Turkey for years by conveying these observations; I've been doing this since 1950.

== Books ==
- İbrahim Balaban (1962). Balaban: babamı ben damda iken vurdular. Yenilik Basımevi.
- Balaban (1968). Şair baba ve damdakiler. Cem Yayınevi.
- İbrahim Balaban (1969). İzdüşümü.
- İbrahim Balaban: yaşamı, sanatı, anılar, yankılar. Bilim Kitabevi. 1989.
- "İbrahim Balaban, Parmakkapı Sanat Galerisi". Parmakkapı Sanat Galerisi. 1993.
- Ibrahim Balaban (2002). Tekbıyık: öyküler. Berlin. ISBN 9789756680261.
- İbrahim Balaban (2003). Nâzım Hikmet'le yedi yıl. Berlin. ISBN 9789756680377.
