= Tayanç Ayaydın =

Turkish actor

- Born: 7 August 1979 (age 46); Istanbul, Turkey
- Occupation: Actor
- Years active: 2004–present
- Spouses: Bulut Köpük (m. 2011; div. 2011) Sally Ghalayini (m. 2015)

Tayanç Ayaydın (born 7 August 1979) is a Turkish actor.

== Life and career ==
Ayaydın was born in 1979 in Istanbul. He started his education at the Private Doğa College's primary school. He finished his high school education at Tercüman High School and İstek Foundation High School. He eventually graduated from Mimar Sinan University with a degree in theatre studies.

He first rose to prominence with his role in the hit series Aliye as Doctor Kahraman. For his role in Ben Hopkins's 2008 movie Pazar-Bir Ticaret Masalı he won the Best Actor award at the Locarno Film Festival. In 2009, he was cast in military series Sakarya Fırat, in which he portrayed the role of a gendarme official named Osman Kanat for 151 episodes. In 2016, he appeared in a recurring role on Kanal D drama series Hayat Şarkısı, playing the character of Hüseyin Cevher. The following year he joined the cast of teen drama Kırgın Çiçekler. He played in sport series "Tek Yürek" and web series "İlk ve Son". He portrayed as Nikos Sampson in historical series "Bir Zamanlar Kıbrıs/Kıbrıs: Zafere Doğru".

== Filmography ==
Television
Year	Title	Role
2004	Gece Yürüyüşü	
2004	Aliye	Dr. Kahraman
2006	Sıla	Abay
2008	Aşk Yakar	Selim
2009	Ey Aşk Nerdesin?	Serdar
2009–2013	Sakarya Fırat	Osman Kanat
2014	Zeytin Tepesi	Tarık Karatay
2016–2017	Hayat Şarkısı	Hüseyin Cevher
2017–2018	Kırgın Çiçekler	Ejder Lokumcuzade
2019	Tek Yürek	Halit Aslan
2020	Yeni Hayat	Timur Karatan
2021–2022	Bir Zamanlar Kıbrıs/ Kıbrıs: Zafere Doğru	Nikos Sampson
2022	Tozluyaka	Önder Koçak
2023	Ömer	Erdal Aksu
2023-2025	Yabani	Güven Aydın
Streaming series
Year	Title	Role
2021	İlk ve Son	Barış
2024	Asaf	Aziz
Film
Year	Title	Role
2004	Ziyaret	young man
2004	Kalbin Zamanı	Genç Cemil
2007	Pazar - Bir Ticaret Masalı	Mihram
2009	11'e 10 Kala	Ömer
2010	Büşra	Yaman
2013	Aşk Kırmızı	Ferhat
2015	Yeni Hayat	Orhan
2015	Son Bir Dans	
2016	Emanet	Mirza
2016	Bana Git De	Ali

== Awards ==
- 2008 Antalya Golden Orange Film Festival - Best Actor (Pazar - Bir Ticaret Masalı)
- 2008 Locarno Film Festival - Best Actor (Pazar - Bir Ticaret Masalı)
