= Münevver Andaç =

Turkish translator

Münevver Andaç (12 February 1917 – 16 May 1997) was a translator of Turkish literature. She was the partner of the poet Nazim Hikmet, with whom she had a son named Mehmet. She translated Hikmet's work into French, as she did for many other Turkish writers. She was also responsible for introducing Orhan Pamuk to the Francophone world. Pamuk has acknowledged Andaç's role in making his work available in French.
