= Portrait of a Lady (poem) =

1915 poem by T. S. Eliot

"Portrait of a Lady" is a poem by American-British poet T. S. Eliot (1888–1965), first published in September 1915 in Others: A Magazine of the New Verse. It was published again in March 1916 in Others: An Anthology of the New Verse, in February 1917 (without the epigraph) in The New Poetry: An Anthology, and finally in his 1917 collection of poems, Prufrock and Other Observations.

The poem's title is widely seen to be derived from the novel of the same name by Henry James. The poem's epigraph is a famous quotation from Christopher Marlowe's play The Jew of Malta: "Thou hast committed - / Fornication: but that was in another country, / And besides, the wench is dead."

The poem is one of the two main Boston poems written by Eliot, the other being "The Love Song of J. Alfred Prufrock". It shows upper class society of the time as something rather empty and forlorn. The main focus of the poem, however, is the speaker, who in his own depiction of this upper class lady as soulless and empty, reveals himself as the one who is truly callous and unfeeling.

The poem tells the story of a failed friendship in three episodes, occurring over a period of ten months. In Part I, the speaker visits the Lady's apartment in December after going with her to a concert, reports her talk of friendship, and suggests that he prefers a more vigorous approach to life. In Part II, the Lady complains about her age, envies her visitor's youth, and says that April sunsets and memories of Paris reconcile her with life, "after all"; again, her visitor turns from her to the world of newspapers, sports and comics, though confessing that he also has moments of exquisite regret. In Part III the speaker takes his farewell from the Lady before going abroad; she wonders why they have not become friends, asks him to write to her and describes her melancholy, solitary fate; in the close the speaker thinks of the Lady possibly dying and questions his behavior towards her.

Like many of Eliot's early poems, "Portrait of a Lady" shows heavy influence from Jules Laforgue. For example, in 'Another Complaint of my Lord Pierrot', Laforgue has the lines:

Finally, if one evening she dies amid my books,
Quiet; feigning not yet to trust my sight
I'd try an 'Oh, that; we'd what it takes, it looks.
Then it was serious, all right?'

While Eliot has the lines:

Well! and what if she should die some afternoon,
Afternoon grey and smoky, evening yellow and rose;
Should die and leave me sitting pen in hand
With the smoke coming down above the housetops;
Doubtful, for a while
Not knowing what to feel or if I understand
Or whether wise or foolish, tardy or too soon...
