= Gaddar (TV series) =

Turkish drama television series

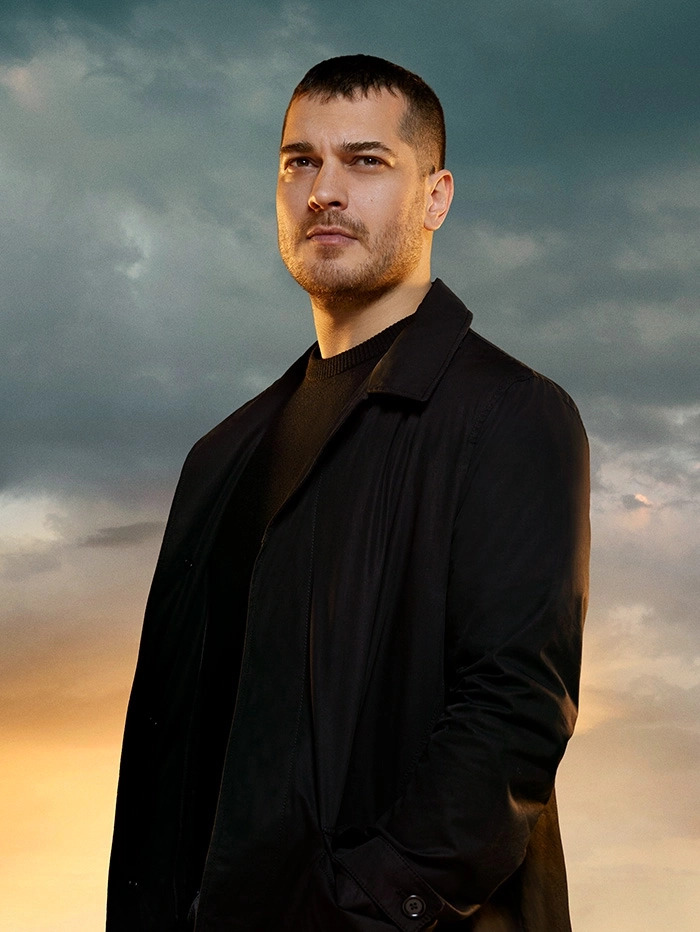
- Gaddar series poster
- Genre: Action thriller; Crime; Drama
- Written by: Hürer Ebeoğlu
- Directed by: Sinan Öztürk
- Starring: Çağatay Ulusoy; Sümeyye Aydoğan; Onur Saylak; Erdal Özyağcılar
- Composer: Toygar Işıklı
- Country of origin: Turkey
- Original language: Turkish
- No. of seasons: 1
- No. of episodes: 20

Production
- Producer: Kerem Çatay
- Camera setup: Single-camera
- Running time: 120 minutes
- Production company: Ay Yapım

Original release
- Network: NOW
- Release: 19 January – 7 June 2024

Gaddar is an action drama Turkish TV series produced by Ay Yapım, the first episode of which was released on January 19, 2024, produced by Kerem Çatay, directed by Sinan Öztürk, written by Hürer Ebeoğlu, and starring Çağatay Ulusoy, Sümeyye Aydoğan, Onur Saylak and Erdal Özyağcılar. The series ended with the 20th and final episode that aired on 7th of June, 2024.

The series was expected to start in February due to Çağatay Ulusoy starring the Netflix series Kübra, Later, this decision was changed by Ay Yapım, the production company of the series, and the series was released on January 19, 2024.

The series is based on real events that took place in Turkey. In the 6th episode the incident of Taxi Driver Oğuz Erge who was killed in the Gaziemir district of Izmir, in the 7th episode the incident of Eros (cat) killed by a person named İbrahim Keloğlan, in the 12th episode the events committed by a water bearer named Metin Şenay, and finally in the 15th and 16th episodes, Adnan Oktar was featured.

== Subject ==
Dağhan Yalçın (Çağatay Ulusoy) returned home to his neighborhood to take leave from the military. However, his family dispersed over the years. His mother Fatma (Laçin Ceylan) and his father Davut (Hakan Salınmış) do not speak to each other. His brother Rüzgar (Fatih Berk Şahin) dropped out of school and moved to a separate house. His sister Yağmur (Itır Esen) started dating with his enemy Enver Baltacı (Alper Çankaya) and got pregnant. His girlfriend Aydan (Sümeyye Aydoğan) has left the neighborhood. Taking advantage of this situation, Kerem (Onur Saylak), nicknamed Manager, makes an offer to him via his assistant named Kurt (Uğur Yıldıran) and events develop.

== Cast and characters ==
Please see the below list for the characters

Actor	Character	Ref
Çağatay Ulusoy	Dağhan Yalçın / Gaddar	
Sümeyye Aydoğan	Aydan Güneş	
Onur Saylak	Müdür Kerem	
Erdal Özyağcılar	Ekber Baltacı	

== Release calendar ==
Season	Air day and time	Season beginning	Season finale	Number of episodes	Release year	TV channel
1. season	Friday 20.00	January 19, 2024	June 7, 2024	20	2024	NOW
