= Game Birds =

2022 Turkish film

- Turkish: Horoz Dövüşü
- Directed by: Majid Panahi
- Written by: Patrick Graham; Majid Panahi
- Produced by: Patrick Graham; Aydın Orak
- Cinematography: Refik Çakar
- Edited by: Mesut Ulutaş
- Music by: Kaveh Salehi
- Release date: 2022
- Running time: 88 minutes
- Country: Turkey
- Language: Turkish

Game Birds (Turkish: Horoz Dövüşü) is a 2022 Turkish film directed by Majid Panahi. The film has appeared at the Ankara Film Festival, the NYC Independent Film Festival, and elsewhere.
