= Serkan Çiftçi =

Austrian footballer

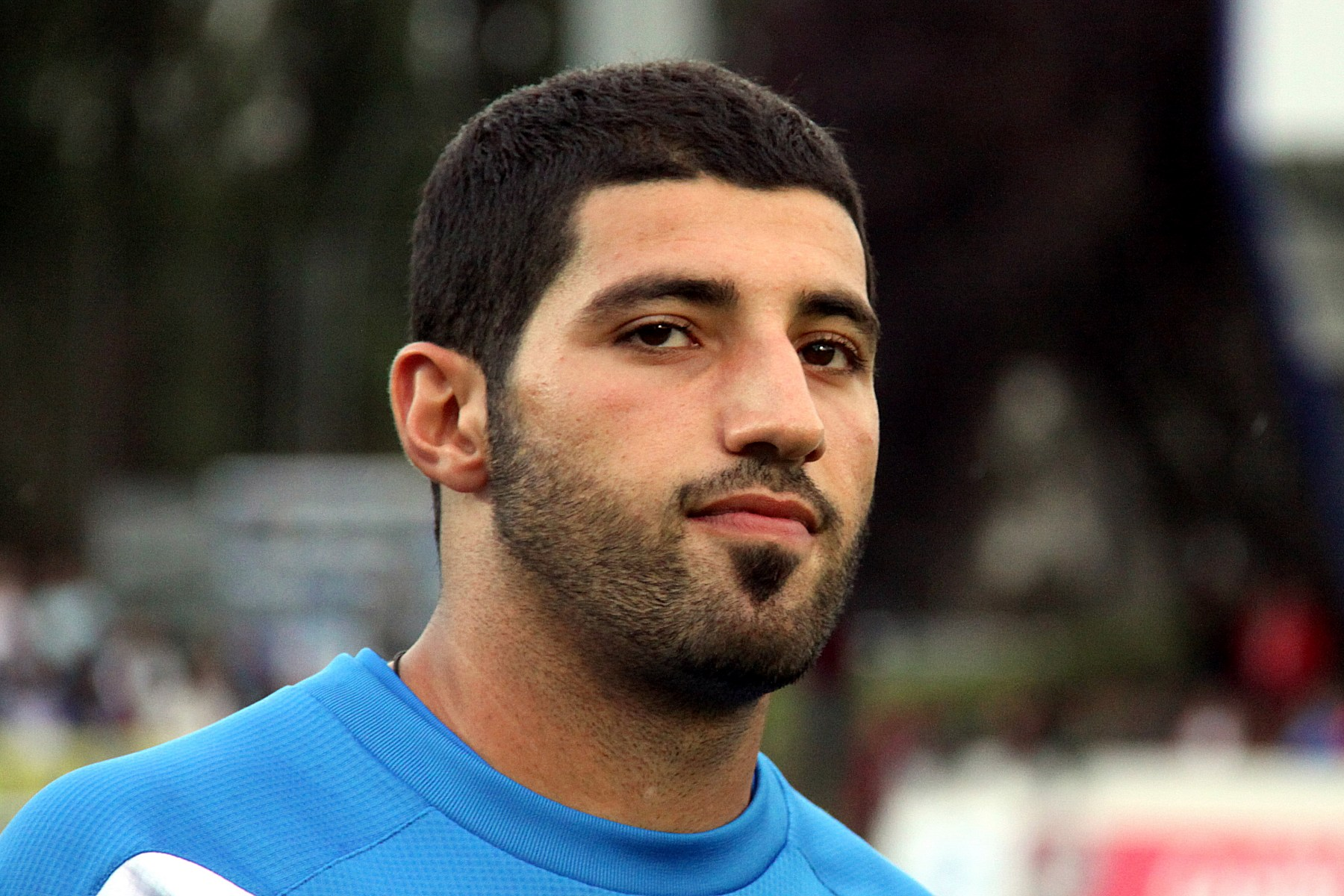
- Çiftçi in 2011 with Wiener Neustadt

Personal information
- Date of birth: 3 August 1989 (age 37)
- Place of birth: Vienna, Austria
- Height: 1.80 m (5 ft 11 in)
- Position: Forward

Team information
- Current team: ATSV Hollabrunn (player)
- Number: 17

Youth career
- 1999–2002: FC Stadlau
- 2002–2004: First Vienna
- 2004–2006: SV Donau Wien
- 2006–2007: UFC Purbach

Senior career*
Years	Team	Apps	(Gls)
2007–2009	Rapid Wien II	42	(9)
2009	Giresunspor	0	(0)
2010–2011	Rapid Wien II	44	(30)
2011–2012	Wiener Neustadt	23	(2)
2012–2013	Sturm Graz	8	(1)
2013–2014	Dardanelspor	14	(2)
2014	Oțelul Galați	7	(0)
2015–2016	Rapid Wien II	8	(1)
2017–2018	St. Georgen/Steinfeld	4	(5)
2018	SV Donau	14	(2)
2018	St. Georgen/Steinfeld	9	(1)
2019–	ATSV Hollabrunn	53	(12)

Managerial career
- 2017–2018: SV Donau (youth coach)
- 2022–: First Vienna (youth coach)
- * Club domestic league appearances and goals as of 17:13, 12 March 2023 (UTC)

Serkan Ciftci (born 3 August 1989) is an Austrian footballer who plays as a forward for ATSV Hollabrunn.
