= More (2017 film) =

Daha
- Directed by: Onur Saylak
- Written by: Hakan Günday
- Screenplay by: Onur Saylak; Hakan Günday; Doğu Yaşar Akal
- Produced by: Kerem Çatay
- Starring: Ahmet Mümtaz Taylan; Tuba Büyüküstün; Hayat Van Eck
- Cinematography: Feza Çaldıran
- Edited by: Ali Aga
- Music by: Uygur Yiğit
- Production company: Digiflame Production
- Distributed by: Bir Film
- Release dates: 3 July 2017 (Karlovy Vary Film Festivali); 12 January 2018 (Türkiye)
- Running time: 115 minutes
- Country: Turkey
- Languages: Turkish; Arabic
- Box office: 92.350 ₺

More (Turkish: Daha) is a 2017 Turkish drama film directed by Onur Saylak. The film stars Ahmet Mumtaz Taylan, Hayat Van Eck and Tuba Buyukustun in the lead roles. The film is based on the novel of the same name by writer Hakan Günday. The film was written by Doğu Yaşar Akal together with Onur Saylak and Hakan Günday. The film was shot in Antalya and premiered on 3 July 2017 as part of the 52nd Karlovy Vary International Film Festival. The film was released in Turkey on January 12, 2018.

== Plot ==
Gaza is a teenager who is only 14 years old. Gaza, who lives with his father in a small coastal town, wants to leave this place behind and continue his education in the big city. However, his father makes Gaza part of a human trafficking network by putting him in a world very different from his dreams, which he had dreamed of. Gaza is also a human trafficker now. Gaza, where her father forced her to spy on immigrants, has two options. Either he will make a life in this dark world, which, like his father, is full of these crimes, or he himself will become an immigrant.

== Awards and nominations ==
Yıl	Ödül / Festival	Kategori	Ödülü alan(lar)	Sonuç	kaynak
2017	24. Uluslararası Adana Film Festivali	"Yılmaz Güney Ödülü"	Onur Saylak	Won	
2017	24. Uluslararası Adana Film Festivali	"Adana İzleyici Ödülü"	Onur Saylak	Won	
2017	24. Uluslararası Adana Film Festivali	"SİYAD En İyi Film Ödülü"	Onur Saylak	Won	
2017	7.Malatya Uluslararası Film Festivali	"Ulusal En İyi Film"	Onur Saylak	Won	
2017	7.Malatya Uluslararası Film Festivali	"En İyi Erkek Oyuncu"	Ahmet Mümtaz Taylan	Won	
2017	7.Malatya Uluslararası Film Festivali	"Umut Vadeden Erkek Oyuncu"	Hayat Van Eck	Won	
2017	7.Malatya Uluslararası Film Festivali	"Kristal Kayısı Jüri Özel Ödülü" (Uluslararası)	Hayat Van Eck	Won	
