= The Market: A Tale of Trade =

- Film poster
- Directed by: Ben Hopkins
- Written by: Ben Hopkins
- Produced by: Roshanak Behesht Nadjad
- Starring: Tayanç Ayaydın; Genco Erkal; Şenay Aydın; Hakan Şahin; Rojin
- Cinematography: Konstantin Kröning
- Music by: Cihan Sezer
- Release date: 27 October 2008
- Running time: 93 minutes
- Countries: Turkey; Germany; United Kingdom; Kazakhstan
- Language: Turkish
- Box office: $ 100 076

The Market: A Tale of Trade (Turkish: Pazar: Bir Ticaret Masalı) is a 2008 internationally co-produced drama film written and directed by Ben Hopkins and starring Tayanç Ayaydın as a small-time black market trader in a provincial town in eastern Turkey tasked with procuring some valuable medicine. The film, which went on nationwide general release across Turkey on 27 October 2008, has won awards at film festivals in Locarno, Ghent and Antalya, where it was the first film directed by a foreigner to win an award in the national competition.

== Production ==
The film was shot on location in Van Province, Turkey in April–June 2007.

== Premise ==
From the film's official website: "1994. Mihram is a comic and inventive small-time blackmarket trader in a provincial town in Eastern Turkey. He has many ideas for good business deals, but never enough capital to realise them. One day the hospital supply truck is robbed, and the local GP hires Mihram to find some medicines on the black market. Finally, Mihram has the necessary capital to make a good deal, but he will have to gamble with the community’s money. If he loses, he will be an outcast. If he wins, he will have a good start-up business. But he hasn’t reckoned with two things – the local mafia, and the inscrutable rules of the marketplace."

== Release ==
The film premiered at the Locarno International Film Festival in 2008. It has been released in cinemas in Germany, Belgium, Holland and Turkey. The UK release was on 16 April 2010 and it has since been broadcast on the digital television channel BBC4.

== Awards ==
- Locarno International Film Festival - Best Actor: Tayanç Ayaydın (won)
- Film Fest Gent, 2008
  - Grand Prix for Best Film
- Antalya Golden Orange Film Festival
  - Best Film (won)
  - Best Actor: Tayanç Ayaydın (won)
  - Best Script (won)
  - Best Costume (won)

== See also ==
- 2008 in film
- Turkish films of 2009
