= Nâzım Hikmet =

Turkish communist poet, playwright and novelist (1902–1963)

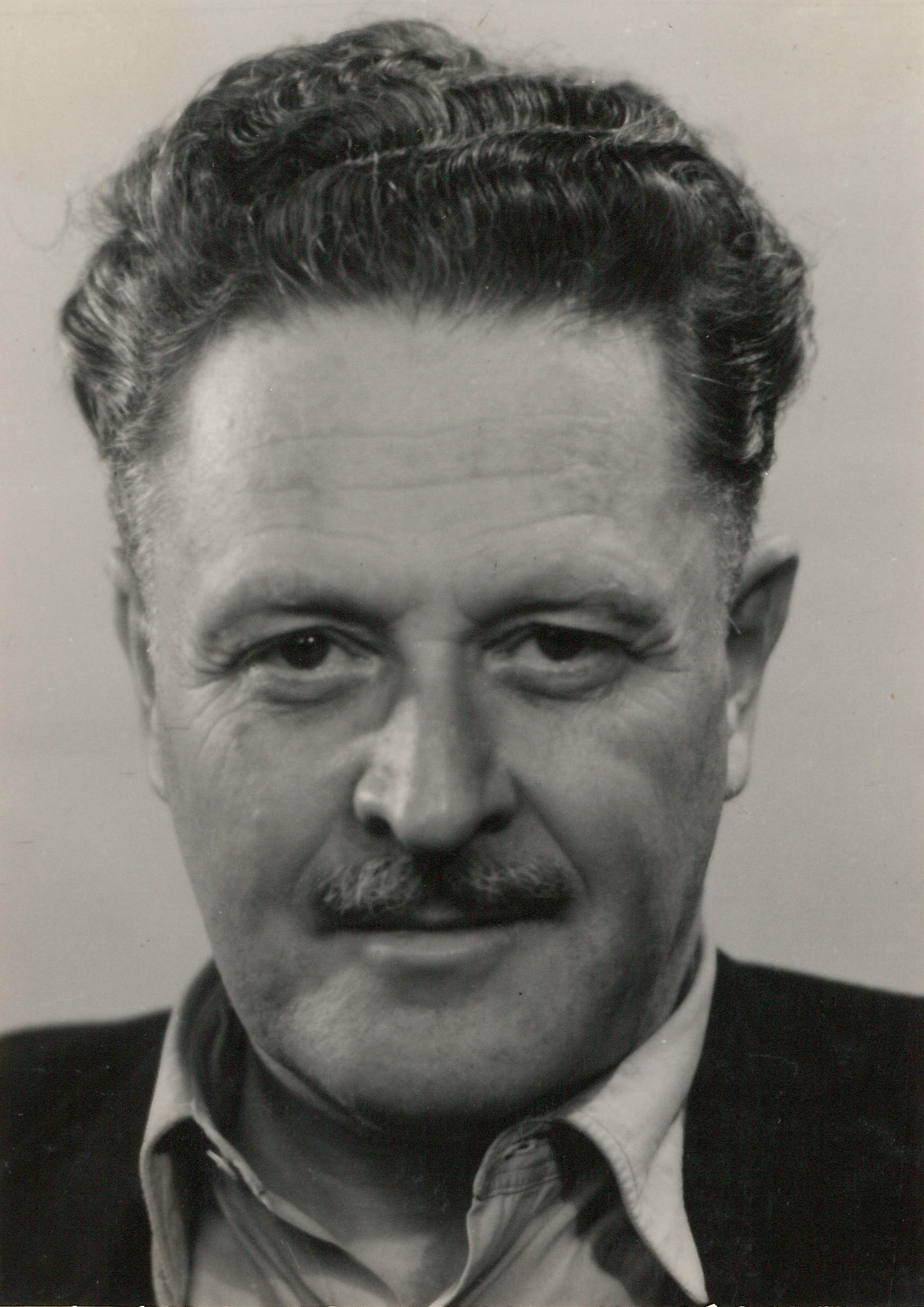
- Nâzım Hikmet in Berlin, 1956
- Born: Mehmed Nâzım; 15 January 1902; Selanik, Salonica, Ottoman Empire (now Thessaloniki, Central Macedonia, Greece)
- Died: 3 June 1963 (aged 61); Moscow, Soviet Union (now Russia)
- Citizenship: Turkey; Poland
- Occupations: Poet; playwright; memoirist; novelist; screenwriter; director
- Writing career
- Pen name: Orhan Selim; Ahmet Oğuz; Mümtaz Osman; Ercüment Er
- Language: Turkish

Signature
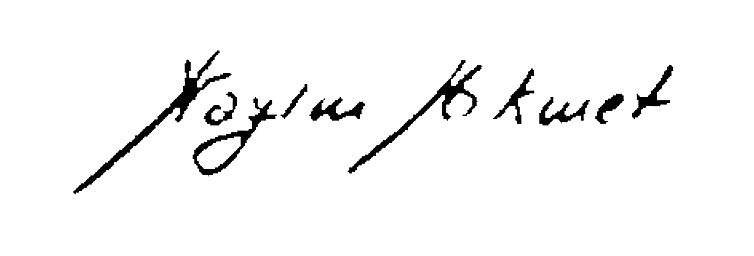

Mehmed Nâzım Ran (17 January 1902 – 3 June 1963), commonly known as Nâzım Hikmet (Turkish: [naːˈzɯm hicˈmet]), was a Turkish poet, playwright, novelist, screenwriter, director, and memoirist. He was acclaimed for the "lyrical flow of his statements". Described as a "romantic communist" and a "romantic revolutionary", he was repeatedly arrested for his political beliefs and spent much of his adult life in prison or in exile. His poetry has been translated into more than 50 languages.

== Family ==
According to Nâzım Hikmet, he was of paternal Turkish and maternal German, Polish, French and Georgian descent. His mother came from a distinguished cosmopolitan family with predominantly-Circassian (Adyghe) roots, along with high social position and relations to the Polish nobility. From his father's side, he had Turkish heritage. His father, Hikmet Bey, was the son of Mehmet Nâzım Pasha, after whom Nâzım Hikmet was named.

Nâzım's maternal grandfather, Hasan Enver Pasha, was the son of the Polish nobleman Mustafa Celalettin Pasha (born: Konstanty Borzęcki) who had emigrated to the Ottoman Empire after the failure of the 1848 Polish uprising, and of Saffet Hanım, the daughter of Omar Pasha, a Serbian, and of Adviye Hanım, a Circassian who was the daughter of Çerkes Hafız Pasha.

Mustafa Celalettin Pasha (born Konstanty Borzęcki herbu Półkozic) wrote Les Turcs anciens et modernes ("The Ancient and Modern Turks") in Istanbul in 1869. That is considered one of the first works of Turkish nationalist political thought.

Nâzım Hikmet's maternal grandmother, Leyla Hanım, was the daughter of Mehmet Ali Pasha, of French Huguenot and German origin, and Ayşe Sıdıka Hanım, a daughter of Çerkes Hafız Paşa. Nâzım Hikmet and Celile Hanım's cousins included Oktay Rifat Horozcu, a leading Turkish poet, and the statesman Ali Fuat Cebesoy.

== Early life ==
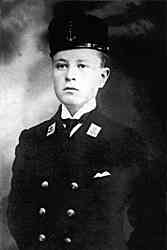
Nâzım Hikmet in 1917, at the age of 15

Nâzım was born on 15 January 1902, in Selânik (Salonica), where his father was serving as an Ottoman government official. He attended the Taşmektep Primary School in the Göztepe district of Istanbul and later enrolled in the junior high school section of the prestigious Galatasaray High School in the Beyoğlu district, where he began to learn French. However, in 1913, he was transferred to the Numune Mektebi, in the Nişantaşı district. In 1918, he graduated from the Ottoman Naval School on Heybeliada, one of the Princes' Islands, in the Sea of Marmara. His school days coincided with a period of political upheaval, during which the Ottoman government entered the First World War and was allied with Germany. For a brief period, he was assigned as a naval officer to the Ottoman Navy cruiser Hamidiye, but in 1919 he became seriously ill and was not able to fully recover. That got him exempted from naval service in 1920.

In 1921, together with his friends Vâlâ Nureddin (Vâ-Nû), Yusuf Ziya Ortaç, Faruk Nafiz Çamlıbel, and a Kurdish friend, Las Govand he went to İnebolu in Anatolia to join the Turkish War of Independence. From there he, together with Vâlâ Nûreddin, walked to Ankara, where the Turkish liberation movement was headquartered. In Ankara, they were introduced to Mustafa Kemal Pasha, later called Atatürk, who wanted the two friends to write a poem that would invite and inspire Turkish volunteers in Istanbul and elsewhere to join their struggle. The poem was much appreciated, and Muhittin Bey (Birgen) decided to appoint them as teachers to the Sultani (high college) in Bolu, rather than to send them to the front as soldiers. However, their communist views were not appreciated by the conservative officials in Bolu and so both of them decided to go to Batumi in the Georgian Soviet Socialist Republic to witness the results of the Russian Revolution of 1917 and arrived there on 30 September 1921. In July 1922, both friends went to Moscow, where Ran studied Economics and Sociology at the Communist University of the Toilers of the East in the early 1920s. There, he was influenced by the artistic experiments of Vladimir Mayakovsky and Vsevolod Meyerhold, as well as the ideological vision of Vladimir Lenin.

== Convictions and prison sentences in Turkey ==
Nâzım Hikmet Ran, being a communist and publishing works that promote socialism, had a proud support for the prosecuted ethnic minorities such as the Kurds, which attracted the attention of the Turkish government. In 1931, a charge was filed against him accusing him of "spreading communist propaganda" because of his poems and writings (Jokond ile Si-ya-u, Varan 3, Sesini Kaybeden Şehir). He was found not guilty on 7 May 1931.

He was arrested and sent to prison on 18 March 1933, for allegedly "promoting communism" with his book Gece Gelen Telgraf. On 29 July 1933, he was found guilty and sentenced to 6 months and 3 days in prison, and in August of that same year he was found guilty of insulting Süreyya İlmen and sentenced to 1 year in prison. He was also ordered to pay a fine of 200 lira and another 500 lira in compensation. On 31 January 1934, Nâzım Hikmet was found guilty on other charges related to promoting communism and sentenced to 5 years of prison, but this decision was not enforced because of the general amnesty of 1935, which set him free.

He received his longest prison sentences in 1938, when he was found guilty of "inciting military mutiny" and sentenced to 13 years and 4 months in prison. Later on that year he received another prison sentence of 15 years for "giving directives on how to spread communism in the army in order to spread the principles of socialism within the armed forces and transform the country into a communist state through a revolutionary movement". His total sentence was announced as 28 years and 4 months by the court, with no reduction in the sentence. He served his prison sentence at different prisons in Ankara, Çankırı, Bursa and Istanbul.

However, he was released in 1950 with an amnesty, which he received due to protests against the Turkish government at that time, demanding Nâzım Hikmet to be released. Many intellectuals around the world such as Albert Camus and Jean-Paul Sartre joined the protests, and famous Turkish authors Orhan Veli Kanık, Oktay Rıfat and Melih Cevdet Anday went on a 3-day hunger strike.

Nâzım was released after these protests and he escaped from Turkey to USSR on 17 June 1951. On 25 July 1951, the government stripped him of his Turkish citizenship.

== Style and achievements ==
Despite writing his first poems in syllabic meter, Nâzım Hikmet distinguished himself from the "syllabic poets" in concept. With the development of his poetic conception, the narrow forms of syllabic verse became too limiting for his style, and he set out to seek new forms for his poems.

He was influenced by the young Soviet poets who advocated Futurism. On his return to Turkey, he became the charismatic leader of the Turkish avant-garde by producing streams of innovative poems, plays and film scripts.

In Moscow in 1922, he broke the boundaries of syllabic meter, changed his form and began writing in free verse.

He has been compared by Turkish and non-Turkish men of letters to such figures as Federico García Lorca, Louis Aragon, Vladimir Mayakovsky, Faiz Ahmed Faiz, Yiannis Ritsos, and Pablo Neruda. Although Ran's work bears a resemblance to these poets and owes them occasional debts of form and stylistic device, his literary personality is unique in terms of the synthesis he made of iconoclasm and lyricism, of ideology and poetic diction.

Many of his poems have been set to music by the Turkish composer Zülfü Livaneli and by Cem Karaca. Part of his work has been translated into Greek by Yiannis Ritsos, and some of the translations have been arranged by the Greek composers Manos Loizos and Thanos Mikroutsikos.

Because of his political views, his works were banned in Turkey from 1938 to 1965.

== Later life and legacy ==
Nâzım's imprisonment in the 1940s became a cause célèbre among intellectuals worldwide. A 1949 committee that included Pablo Picasso, Paul Robeson, and Jean-Paul Sartre campaigned for his release.

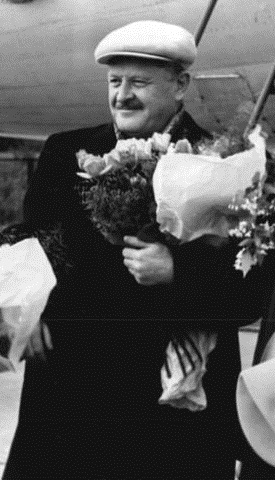
Nâzım Hikmet in East Germany, 1952

On 8 April 1950, Nâzım began a hunger strike to protest the Turkish Parliament's failure to include an amnesty law in its agenda before it closed for the upcoming general election. He was then transferred from the prison in Bursa, first to the infirmary of Sultanahmet Jail, in Istanbul, and later to Paşakapısı Prison. Seriously ill, Ran suspended his strike on 23 April, National Sovereignty and Children's Day. His doctor's request to treat him in hospital for three months was refused by officials. As his imprisonment status had not changed, he resumed his hunger strike on the morning of 2 May.

Nâzım's hunger strike caused a stir throughout the country. Petitions were signed and a magazine named after him was published. His mother, Celile, began a hunger strike on 9 May, followed by the renowned Turkish poets Orhan Veli, Melih Cevdet and Oktay Rıfat the next day. In light of the new political situation after the 1950 Turkish general election, held on 14 May, the strike ended five days later, on 19 May, Turkey's Commemoration of Atatürk, Youth and Sports Day, when he was finally released by a general amnesty law enacted by the new government.

On 22 November 1950, the World Council of Peace announced that Nâzım was among the recipients of the International Peace Prize, along with Pablo Picasso, Paul Robeson, Wanda Jakubowska and Pablo Neruda.

Later on, Nâzım escaped from Turkey to Romania on a ship via the Black Sea and from there moved to the Soviet Union. Because the Soviet bloc recognized the Turkish minority only in communist Bulgaria, the poet's books were immediately brought out in this country, both in Turkish originals and in Bulgarian translations. The communist authorities in Bulgaria celebrated him in Turkish and Bulgarian publications as 'a poet of liberty and peace.' The goal was to discredit Turkey presented as a "lackey of the imperialist" United States in the eyes of Bulgaria's Turkish minority, many of whom desired to leave for or were expelled to Turkey in 1950–1953.

When the EOKA struggle broke out in Cyprus, Ran believed that its population could live together peacefully, and he called on the Cypriot Turks to support the Greek Cypriots' demand for an end to British rule and union with Greece (enosis). Hikmet drew negative reaction from Turkish Cypriots for his opinions.

Persecuted for decades by Turkey during the Cold War for his communist views, Nâzım died of a heart attack in Moscow on 3 June 1963 at 6.30 a.m. while he was picking up a morning newspaper at the door of his summer house in Peredelkino. He is buried in Moscow's Novodevichy Cemetery, where his tomb is still a place of pilgrimage for Turks and others from around the world. His final wish, which was never carried out, was to be buried under a plane tree (platanus) in any village cemetery in Anatolia.

His poems depicting the people of the countryside, villages, towns and cities of his homeland (Memleketimden İnsan Manzaraları, "Human Landscapes from my Country"), as well as the Turkish War of Independence (Kurtuluş Savaşı Destanı, i.e. The Epic of the War of Independence"), and the Turkish revolutionaries (Kuvâyi Milliye, "Force of the Nation) are considered among the greatest literary works of Turkey.

After his death, the Kremlin ordered the publication of the poet's first-ever Turkish-language collected works in communist Bulgaria, where a large and recognized Turkish national minority still existed. The eight volumes of these collected works, Bütün eserleri, appeared at Sofia between 1967 and 1972, in the very last years of the existence of the Turkish minority educational and publishing system in Bulgaria.

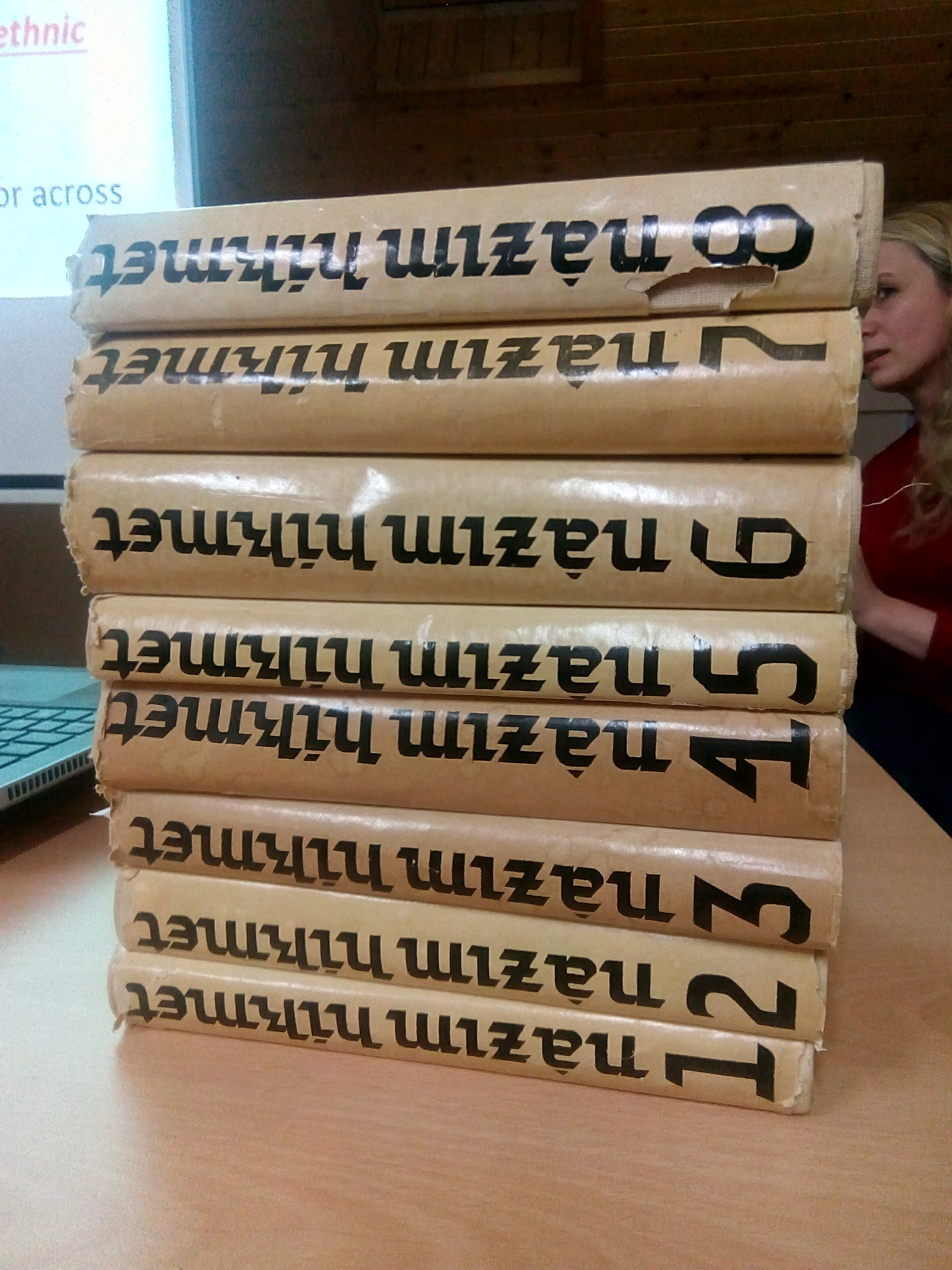
The first-ever collected works of the Turkish poet Nâzım Hikmet, published in communist Bulgaria

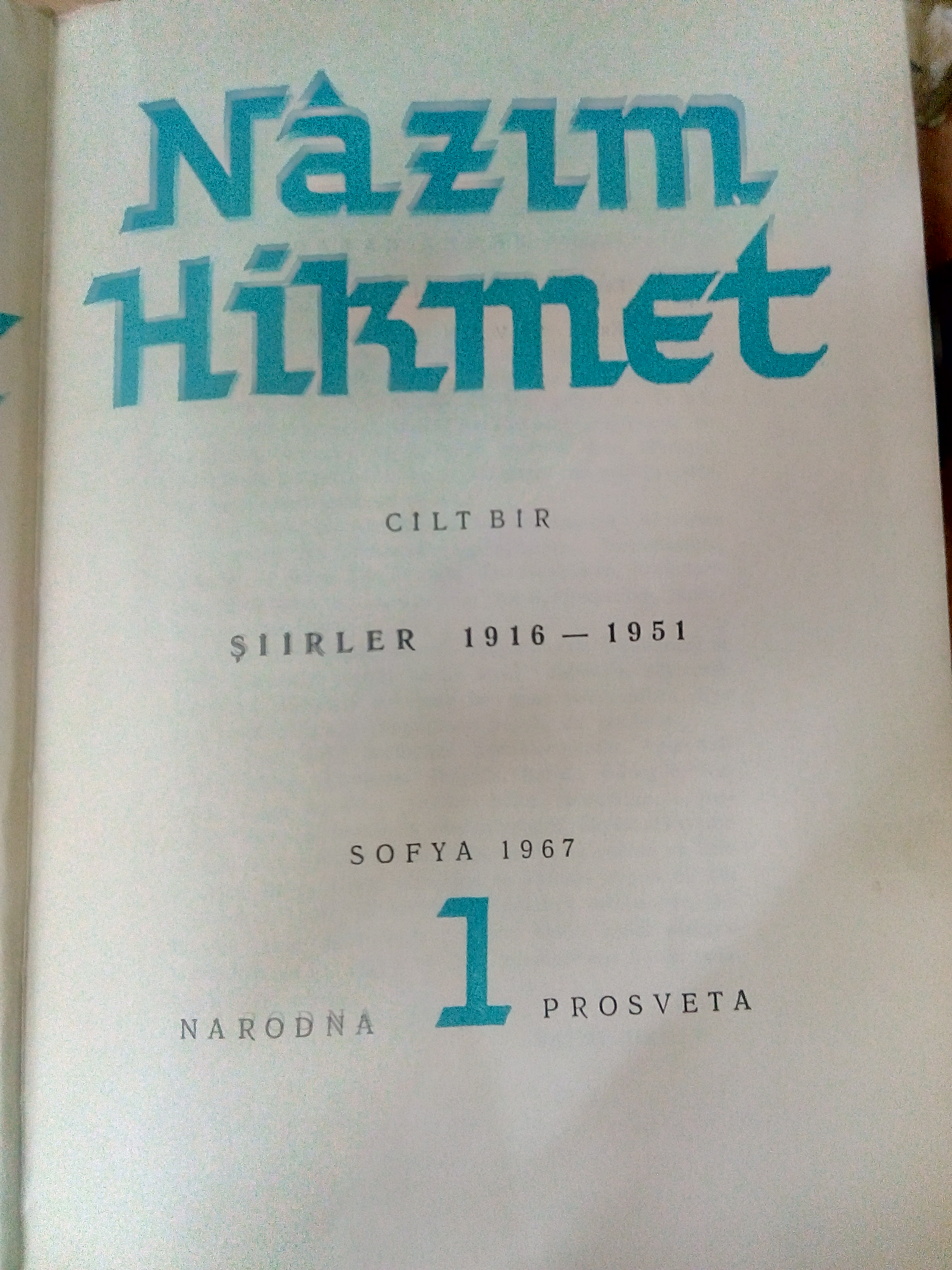
Frontispiece of Volume 1 of the first-ever collected works of the Turkish poet Nâzım Hikmet

Nâzım had Polish and Turkish citizenship. The latter was revoked in 1959 and restored in 2009. His family has been asked if it wanted his remains repatriated from Russia.

== Patronage ==
During the 1940s, as he was serving his sentence at Bursa Prison, painted. There, he met a young inmate, İbrahim Balaban. Ran discovered Balaban's talent in drawing, gave all his paint and brushes to him, and encouraged him to continue with painting. Ran influenced the peasant and educated him, who had finished only a three-grade village school, in forming his own ideas in the fields of philosophy, sociology, economics, and politics. Ran greatly admired Balaban and referred to him in a letter to the novelist Kemal Tahir as the "peasant painter" (Turkish: Köylü ressam). Their contact remained after they were released from the prison.

== Selected works ==
=== Human Landscapes ===
Hikmet started working on Human Landscapes ("Memleketimden İnsan Manzaraları") in 1939 and it finally got published in 1960. Its 16'000 lines of verse cover major historical events in Turkey in the first half of the 20th Century. Its perspective wanders stream of consciousness style from person to person in then Anatolia. The work is considered to be one of the foundational works of Turkish literature and Hikmet's magnum opus.

The book consists of five parts. The fifth part is unfinished.

=== "I Come and Stand at Every Door" ===
Nâzım's poem "Kız Çocuğu" ("The Girl Child") conveys a plea for peace from a seven-year-old girl, ten years after she perished in the US atomic bomb attacks at Hiroshima and Nagasaki. It has achieved worldwide popularity as a powerful anti-war message and has been performed and translated in many languages as a song by a number of singers and musicians both in Turkey and many countries. It is also known in English by various other titles, including "I Come and Stand at Every Door", "I Unseen", "Hiroshima child" and "Hiroshima Girl".

==== Turkish ====
- Zülfü Livaneli has performed a version of the original Turkish poem on his album Nazım Türküsü, which was later sung in Turkish by Joan Baez.
- Fazıl Say included the poem in his Nazım oratorio in Turkish.

==== Bengali ====
- Subhash Mukhopadhyay (poet) translated Hikmet's poems into Bengali. The poems are collected in two anthologies, Nirbachita Nazim Hikmet (1952)(Selected Poems of Nazem Hikmet) ISBN 81-7079-501-X and Nazem Hikmet er Aro Kobita (1974) (More Poems of Nazem Himet). Some of the translations are available in open source.

==== Greek ====
- Thanos Mikroutsikos, in the album Politika tragoudia (Political Songs, 1975) composed a series of Hikmet's poems, adapted in Greek by the poet Yiannis Ritsos.
- Manos Loizos composed settings of some of Ran's poems, adapted in Greek by Yiannis Ritsos. They are included in the 1983 disc Grammata stin agapimeni (Letters to the Beloved One).

==== English ====
- The usual tune is a nontraditional melody composed by Jim Waters in 1954 to fit the lyrics of Child 113 ballad "The Great Silkie of Sule Skerry", which was recorded by American folksinger Joan Baez as "Silkie" on her second album Joan Baez, Vol. 2 in 1961.
- According to American activist folk musician Pete Seeger, Jeanette Turner did a loose English "singable translation" of the poem under a different title, "I Come And Stand At Every Door", and sent a note to Seeger asking "Do you think you could make a tune for it?" in the late 1950s. After a week of trial and failure, the English translation was used by Seeger in 1962 with an adaptation of "an extraordinary melody put together by a Massachusetts Institute of Technology student, James Waters, who had put a new tune to a mystical ballad 'The Great Silkie' which he could not get out of his head, without permission." Seeger wrote in Where Have All the Flowers Gone?: "It was wrong of me. I should have gotten his permission. But it worked. The Byrds made a good recording of it, electric guitars and all." Seeger also used the track in his 1999 compilation album Headlines & Footnotes: A Collection Of Topical Songs. Seeger sang the song on 9 August 2013, the 68th anniversary of the Nagasaki atomic bombing, on a Democracy Now! interview.
- British folk singer Harvey Andrews recorded a version under the title "Child of Hiroshima" (sometimes re-released as "Children of Hiroshima"), released on his eponymous debut EP in 1965.
- The Byrds; the American rock band used the translation on their third album Fifth Dimension in 1966.
- Roger McGuinn of the Byrds later recorded the song with its original lyrics as part of his Folk Den project.
- The Misunderstood used the translation, changing the title to "I Unseen", on a 1969 UK Fontana single, later included in the 1997 anthology album Before The Dream Faded with their own tune.
- Paul Robeson recorded the song as "The Little Dead Girl" with another translation.

The song was later covered by

- Ivo Watts-Russell's supergroup, This Mortal Coil on their 1991 album Blood with vocals of Louise Rutkowski, Deirdre Rutkowski with Tim Freeman and 1983–1991.
- The Fall on their 1997 album Levitate, albeit omitting the last verse and wrongly attributing writing credits to anon/J Nagle. "I Come and Stand at Your Door" listed as "Anon/Nagle", which is an interpretation of the song "I Come and Stand at Every Door". "Jap Kid" is an instrumental version of this track.
- Silent Stream Of Godless Elegy, a Moravian folk metal band, on their album Behind the Shadows in 1998.
- Faith & Disease on their 1998 album Insularia.
- Anne Hills on 1998 album Where Have All the Flowers Gone: The Songs of Peter Seeger.
- Ibon Errazkin has an instrumental song with the same title on Esculea de arte.
- Styrofoam aka Arne Van Petegem's EP and first US release, RR20, included an instrumental version of the traditional tune of "Great Silkie" with the same title.

Nâzım Hikmet's children's tale, "Sevdalı Bulut" (A Cloud in Love), has been translated into English by Evrim Emir-Sayers for dePICTions, the annual critical review of the Paris Institute for Critical Thinking (PICT). The translation is open-access.

==== Japanese ====
In 2005, famous Amami Ōshima singer Chitose Hajime collaborated with Ryuichi Sakamoto by translating "Kız Çocuğu" into Japanese, retitling it Shinda Onna no Ko [死んだ女の子] "A dead girl"). It was performed live at the Atomic Bomb Dome in Hiroshima on the eve of the 60th Anniversary (5 August 2005) of Atomic bombings of Hiroshima and Nagasaki. The song later appeared as a bonus track on Chitose's album Hanadairo in 2006.

==== Nepali ====
Some of Nâzım's poems are translated into Nepali by Suman Pokhrel and are published in print and online literary journals.

=== On the soldier worth 23 cents ===
How do you propose to get it? Do you want to get it through the cooperation of Turkey where the men in the ranks get 23 cents a month the first year and 32 cents the second year, or do you want to get an American division and equip it and send it over to Turkey which would cost you 10 times as much?

— John Foster Dulles, U.S. Secretary of State, 1955

He also opposed the Korean War, in which Turkey participated. After the Senate address of John Foster Dulles, who served as U.S. Secretary of State under President Dwight D. Eisenhower, where he valued Turkish soldiers at 23 cents a month compared with the lowest echelon U.S. soldiers at $70, Nâzım Hikmet Ran wrote a protest poem criticising the policies of the United States. This poem is titled "23 Sentlik Askere Dair" (On the soldier worth 23 cents).

== In popular culture ==
- Nâzım's poem "We'll Give the Globe to the Children" was set to music in 1979 by Russian composer David Tukhmanov.
- The 1979 Russian animated film Tale of Tales is partially inspired by Hikmet's poem of the same name.
- Finnish band Ultra Bra recorded a song "Lähettäkää minulle kirjoja" ("Send me books") based on a translated excerpt of Hikmet's poem "Rubai".
- The Ignorant Fairies is a 2001 Italian film, in which a book by Hikmet plays a central plot role. This is reprised in the 2022 TV serialization of the film.
- The Blue-Eyed Giant is a 2007 Turkish biographical film about Nâzım Hikmet. The title is a reference to the poem Minnacık Kadın ve Hanımelleri. The film chronicles Nâzim Hikmet's imprisonment at Bursa Prison and his relationships with his wife Piraye and his translator and lover Münevver Andaç. He is played by Yetkin Dikinciler.
- Nâzım Hikmet's children's tale, "A Cloud in Love," was adapted into an animated short film in the Soviet Union in 1959 and into a children's opera by the Greek National Opera in 2022. The tale was translated into English by Evrim Emir-Sayers for dePICTions, the open-access annual critical review of the Paris Institute for Critical Thinking (PICT), in 2023.
- Nâzım's poem 'You' appears in the prologue of the main campaign of the 2020 videogame Suzerain, developed by Torpor Games.

== Bibliography ==
=== Plays ===
- Kafatası (1932, The Skull)
- Unutulan Adam (1935, The Forgotten Man)
- Ferhad ile Şirin 1965 (Ferhad and Şirin)
- Lüküs Hayat (Luxurious Living) (as ghostwriter)

=== Ballet libretto ===
- Legend of Love (by Arif Malikov) 1961

=== Novels ===
- Yaşamak Güzel Şey Be Kardeşim (1967, Life's Good, Brother)
- Kan Konuşmaz (1965, Blood Doesn't Tell)

=== Poems ===
- "Taranta-Babu'ya Mektuplar" (1935, "Letters to Taranta-Babu")
- "Simavne Kadısı Oğlu Şeyh Bedreddin Destanı" (1936, "The Epic of Sheikh Bedreddin")
- "Memleketimden İnsan Manzaraları" (1966–67, "Human Landscapes from My Country")
- "Kurtuluş Savaşı Destanı" (1965, "The Epic of the War of Independence")

=== Poetry ===
- İlk şiirler / Nâzım Hikmet, İstanbul : Yapı Kredi, 2002. ISBN 975-08-0380-9
- 835 satır / Nâzım Hikmet, İstanbul : YKY, 2002. ISBN 975-08-0373-6
- Benerci kendini niçin öldürdü? / Nâzım Hikmet, İstanbul : YKY, 2002. ISBN 975-08-0374-4
- Kuvâyi Milliye / Nâzım Hikmet, İstanbul : YKY, 2002. ISBN 975-08-0375-2
- Yatar Bursa Kalesinde / Nâzım Hikmet, İstanbul : YKY, 2002. ISBN 975-08-0376-0
- Memleketimden insan manzaraları : (insan manzaraları) / Nâzım Hikmet, İstanbul : YKY, 2002. ISBN 975-08-0377-9
- Yeni şiirler : (1951–1959) / Nâzım Hikmet, İstanbul : Yapı Kredi Yayınları, 2002. ISBN 975-08-0378-7
- on şiirleri : (1959–1963) / Nâzım Hikmet, İstanbul : Yapı Kredi Yayınları, 2002. ISBN 975-08-0379-5

=== Partial list of translated works in English ===
- Selected Poems / Nâzim Hikmet; done into English by Taner Baybars. London, Cape Editions, 1967.
- The Moscow Symphony and Other Poems / translated into English by Taner Baybars. Chicago: Swallow Press, 1971.
- The day before tomorrow : poems / translated into English by Taner Baybars. South Hinksey, England : Carcanet Press, 1972. ISBN 0-902145-43-6
- That Wall / Nâzım Hikmet; illustrations [by] Maureen Scott, London: League of Socialist Artists, 1973. ISBN 0-9502976-2-3
- Things I didn't know I loved: selected poems / Nâzim Hikmet; translated by Randy Blasing & Mutlu Konuk. New York : Persea Books, 1975. ISBN 0-89255-000-7
- Human Landscapes / by Nâzim Hikmet; translated by Randy Blasing and Mutlu Konuk; foreword by Denise Levertov, New York : Persea Books, c1982. ISBN 0-89255-068-6
- Selected poetry / Nâzim Hikmet; translated by Randy Blasing and Mutlu Konuk, New York : Persea Books, c1986. ISBN 0-89255-101-1
- Poems of Nazim Hikmet, trans. Randy Blasing & Mutlu Konuk. New York: Persea Books, 1994 (revised 2nd ed., 2002).
- Beyond the walls: selected poems / Nâzim Hikmet; translated by Ruth Christie, Richard McKane, Talât Sait Halman; introduction by Talât Sait Halman, London: Anvil Press Poetry, 2002. ISBN 0-85646-329-9
- Life's Good, Brother / Nâzım Hikmet; translated by Mutlu Konuk Blasing, New York: W. W. Norton & Company, 2013. ISBN 978-0892554188
- "A Cloud in Love" / Nâzım Hikmet; translated by Evrim Emir-Sayers, dePICTions volume 3: Critical Ecologies (2023), Paris Institute for Critical Thinking (open-access).

=== Partial list of translated works in other languages ===
- Poesie / Nâzım Hikmet, Joyce Lussu (Trans.), Newton Compton, 2010. ISBN 978-88-541-2027-3
- La conga con Fidel / Nâzım Hikmet, Joyce Lussu (Trans.), Fahrenheit 451, 2005. ISBN 978-88-86095-89-1
- Il nuvolo innamorato e altre fiabe / Nâzım Hikmet, Giampiero Bellingeri (Trans.), F. Negrin (Illustrator), Mondadori, 2003. ISBN 978-8804524892
- De mooiste van Hikmet / Nâzım Hikmet, Koen Stassijns & Ivo van Strijtem (ed.), Perihan Eydemir & Joris Iven (Trans.), Lannoo | Atlas, 2003. ISBN 90-209-5266-8
- Poesie d'amore / Nâzım Hikmet, Joyce Lussu (Trans.), Mondadori, 2002. ISBN 978-88-04-50091-9
- Il neige dans la nuit et autres poèmes / Nâzım Hikmet, Münevver Andaç (Trans.), Güzin Dino (Trans.), Gallimard, 1999. ISBN 978-20-70329-63-2
- Preso na Fortaleza de Bursa/Yatar Bursa Kalesinde, Leonardo da Fonseca (Trans.), In. (n.t.) Revista Literária em Tradução nº 1 (set/2010), Fpolis/Brasil, ISSN 2177-5141
- Vita del poeta / Nâzım Hikmet, Joyce Lussu (Trans.), Cattedrale, 2008. ISBN 978-88-95449-15-9
- Paesaggi umani / Nâzım Hikmet, Joyce Lussu (Trans.), Fahrenheit 451, 1992. ISBN 978-88-86095-00-6
- Gran bella cosa è vivere, miei cari / Nâzım Hikmet, F. Beltrami (Trans.), Mondadori, 2010. ISBN 978-88-04603-22-1
- Poesie d'amore e di lotta / Nâzım Hikmet, G. Bellingeri (Editor), F. Beltrami (Trans.), F. Boraldo (Trans.), Mondadori, 2013. ISBN 978-88-04-62713-5
- Les Romantiques (La vie est belle, mon vieux) / Nâzım Hikmet, Münevver Andaç (Trans.), Temps Actuels, 1982. ISBN 978-22-01015-75-5
- La Joconde et Si-Ya-Ou / Nâzım Hikmet, Abidine Dino (Trans.), Parangon, 2004. ISBN 978-28-41901-14-2
- Pourquoi Benerdji s'est-il suicidé? / Nâzım Hikmet, Münevver Andaç (Trans.), Aden Editions, 2005. ISBN 978-29-30402-12-3
- Le nuage amoureux / Nâzım Hikmet, Münevver Andaç (Trans.), Gallimard Jeunesse Giboulées, 2013. ISBN 978-20-70648-89-4
- Últimos poemas I (1959–1960–1961) / Nâzım Hikmet, Fernando García Burillo (Trans.), Ediciones Del Oriente Y Del Mediterráneo S.L., 2000. ISBN 978-84-87198-60-1
- Últimos poemas II (1962–1963): Poemas finales / Nâzım Hikmet, Fernando García Burillo (Trans.), Ediciones Del Oriente Y Del Mediterráneo S.L., 2005. ISBN 978-84-87198-75-5
- Poezje wybrane / Nâzım Hikmet, Małgorzata Łabęcka-Koecherowa (Trans.), Ludowa Spółdzielnia Wydawnicza, 1981. ISBN 978-83-20533-75-0
- Romantyczność / Nâzım Hikmet, Aleksander Olecki (Trans.), Książka i Wiedza, 1965.
- Allem-kallem: baśnie tureckie / Nâzım Hikmet, Małgorzata Łabęcka-Koecherowa (Trans.), Elżbieta Gaudasińska (Trans.), Nasza Księgarnia, 1985. ISBN 831008515X
- Zakochany obłok: baśń turecka / Nâzım Hikmet, Małgorzata Łabęcka-Koecherowa (Trans.), Krajowa Agencja Wydawnicza, 1987. ISBN 978-83-03016-35-5
- 나쥠 히크메트 시선집 [Selected Poems of Nâzım Hikmet / Nâzım Hikmet] (in Korean (North Korea)). Translated by Paik, Sok; Chon, Chang-shik; Kim, Byong-wook. Pyongyang: National Press. Pyongyang. 1956.
- Legenda o miłości. Opowieść o Turcji / Nâzım Hikmet, Ewa Fiszer (Trans.), Państwowy Instytut Wydawniczy, 1954
- Many of Hikmet's poems are translated into Nepali by Suman Pokhrel, and some are collected in an anthology tilled Manpareka Kehi Kavita.

== See also ==
- Abidin Dino
- Orhan Kemal
- Zülfü Livaneli
- Fazıl Say
- Behçet Necatigil
