= Caner Topçu =

Turkish actor (born 1997)

- Born: 25 June 1997 (age 29); Istanbul, Turkey
- Education: Harun Özer Theatre; Fulya Filazi Acting School
- Occupation: Actor
- Years active: 2015–present

Caner Topçu (born 25 June 1997) is a Turkish actor.

== Life and career ==
Caner Topçu was born on 25 June 1997 in Istanbul to a family from Kastamonu. He graduated from Industrial Vocational High School. He is studying in logistic department of Istanbul Arel University. He showed interest in acting and received acting lessons from Harun Özer and Fulya Filazi. During this period, he was cast in many theatre plays, including Beyaz Cehennem, Dikkat İnternet Var, Sarıkamış and İnançtan Zafere.

In 2015, he made his cinematic debut with the movie Bilinçsizler, portraying the character of Recep. He is best known for his role as İlyas Reis in the historical TV drama Barbaroslar: Akdeniz'in Kılıcı and especially as Kanat Günay in the teen drama series Duy Beni.

== Filmography ==
=== Series ===
Year	Title	Role	Network	Episodes
2019	Nöbet	Caner	Show TV	8 episodes
2021	Hiç	Deniz	BluTV	8 episodes
2021–2022	Barbaroslar: Akdeniz'in Kılıcı	İlyas Reis	TRT1	31 episodes
2022	Duy Beni	Kanat Günay	Star TV	20 episodes
2023	Dönence	Özgür	Kanal D	14 episodes
2024	Şahane Hayatım	Demir	NOW	9 episodes
2026	Mehmed: Fetihler Sultanı	Şehzade Bayezid	TRT1	

=== Film ===
Year	Title	Role	Director
2015	Bilinçsizler	Recep	Furkan Kopuz
2018	Evrensel Döngü: Yaşam Ağacına Yolculuk	Ömer Ali (Kopya)	Furkan Kopuz
2019	Evrensel Döngü 2: Zamansal Yolculuk	Ömer Ali (Kopya)	Furkan Kopuz
2023	Başka Türlü Aşk	Cemil	Hande Turkel
