= There (2009 film) =

- Theatrical poster
- Directed by: Hakkı Kurtuluş; Melik Saraçoğlu
- Written by: Hakkı Kurtuluş; Melik Saraçoğlu
- Produced by: Hakkı Kurtuluş; Melik Saraçoğlu
- Starring: Dolunay Soysert; Sinan Tuzcu; Erol Günaydın
- Cinematography: Eyüp Boz
- Edited by: Çiçek Kahraman
- Music by: Alper Maral
- Production company: İki Film
- Distributed by: Özen Film
- Release date: December 25, 2009
- Running time: 96 minutes
- Country: Turkey
- Language: Turkish
- Box office: $12,858

There (Turkish: Orada) is a 2009 Turkish drama film written, produced and directed by Hakkı Kurtuluş and Melik Saraçoğlu, which follows 24 hours in the life of a troubled family. The film, which went on nationwide general release across Turkey on December 25, 2009, has been screened at numerous international film festivals.

== Plot ==
When the matriarch of an Istanbul family dies in a home for the elderly, the son and the daughter bury their mother and set off to find their father, a recluse in the family house on one of the Princes' Islands. As the three members of the family come together, it turns into a day of painful confrontations.

== Release ==
=== Premiere ===
The film had its world premiere on October 9, 2009 in competition at the 36th Film Fest Ghent.

=== General release ===
The film opened in 10 screens across Turkey on December 25, 2009 at number twenty-three in the Turkish box office chart with an opening weekend gross of $4,007.

=== Festival screenings ===
- 2009
  - 36th Film Fest Ghent (6-17 Oct)
  - 31st Cinemed Montpellier Film Festival (23 Oct–1 Nov)
  - Osian's Cinefan Film Festival (24–31 Oct)
  - Amiens Film Festival in France (13-22 Nov)
  - Bratislava Film Festival (27 Nov-4 Dec)
  - 14th Film Festival of Kerala (11 Dec-18 Dec)
- 2010
  - Angers Premiers Plans Film Festival (22-31 Jan)
  - Annonay International First Film Festival (29 Jan-08 Feb)
  - Rennes Travelling Film Festival (9-16 Feb)
  - Mediterranean Film Weeks (05-18 Mar)
  - 21st Ankara International Film Festival (11-21 Mar)
  - Kosmorama Film Festival (11-16 Mar)
  - Istanbul International Film Festival (3-18 Apr)
  - Ecofilms Film Festival (22-17 Jun)

== Reception ==
=== Box Office ===
The film has made a total gross of $12,858.

== See also ==
- 2009 in film
- Turkish films of 2009
