= Emre Kınay =

Turkish actor

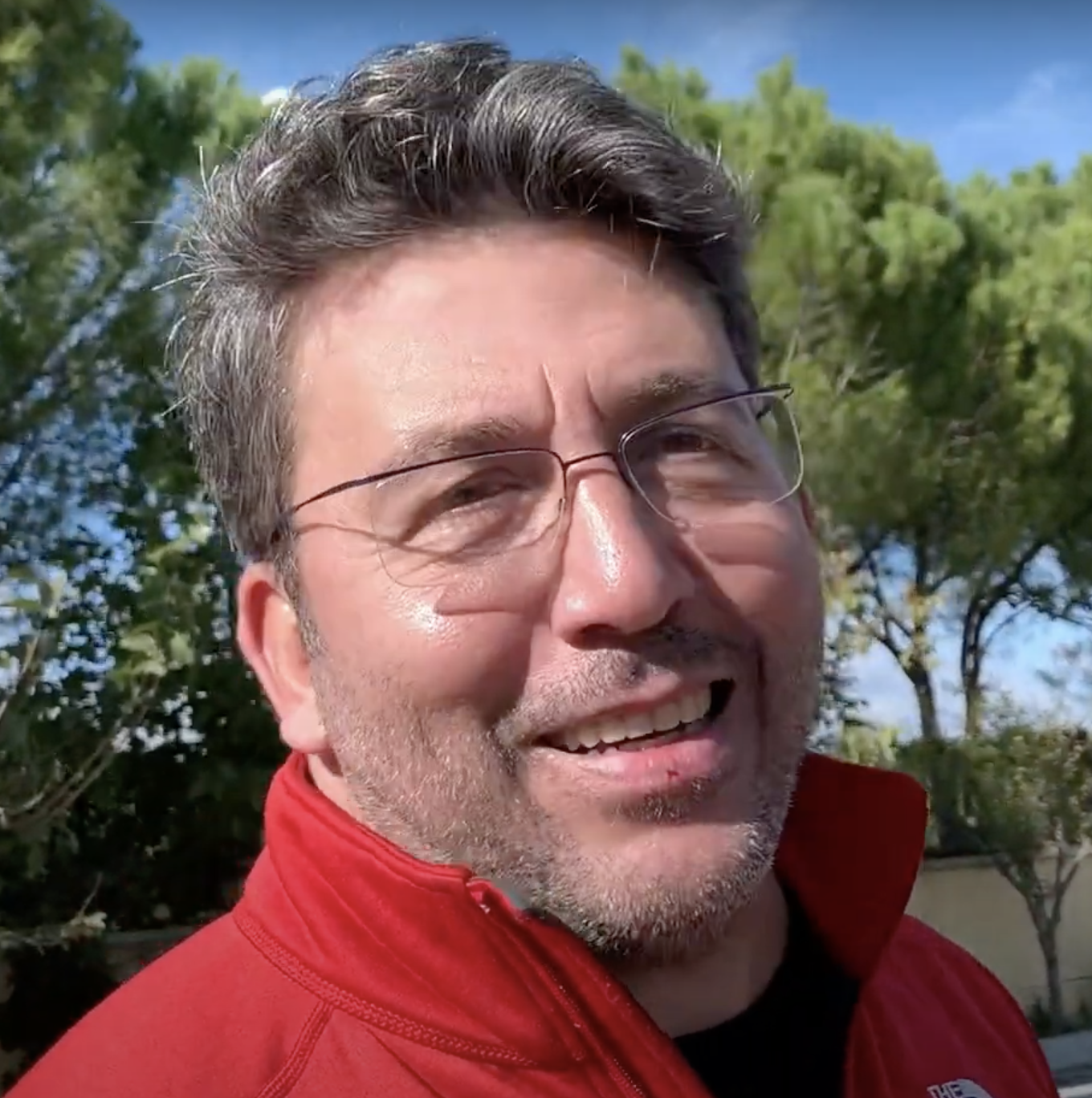
- Kınay in 2020
- Born: 5 March 1970 (age 56); Istanbul, Turkey
- Occupations: Actor, artist
- Years active: 1990–present
- Spouse: Emine Ün (m. 2004; div. 2009)
- Children: 1

Emre Kınay (born 5 March 1970) is a Turkish actor. His father Feridun Kınay worked in cinema. His mother Remziye Kınay is theater actress. His maternal family is of Circassian descent. His paternal family is of Arab and Albanian descent.

== Career ==
The actor is playing in various films and TV series who playing in communities like Dostlar Theater and Bakırköy Municipal Theaters. He is presently staging plays in the community of Duru Theater where he is founder.

He made a name with the character who is a landlord, Erkan, playing in the hit crime series of Yılan Hikayesi. He played in hit series "Yeditepe İstanbul" and "Berivan" with Sibel Can.

He was largely well known with the series of İki Aile, in playing a father character who has three girl and sharing the starring role with İclal Aydın. He played in summer series "Dürüye'nin Güğümleri" with Kaan Urgancıoğlu. He played in period series "Ustura Kemal" based comic book.

He played a character who is a basketball coach, Cihan, in the series of Güneşi Beklerken, and then in series Sil Baştan as a lawyer who returns to high school after years later and in youth film "Okul". He played Haluk character in the youth series of Güneşin Kızları ending in 2016. He played as Halil character in the series of Kara Yazı alongside Haluk Bilginer. He had guest role in popular comedy crime series "Ulan İstanbul".

== Awards ==
- 20th Awards of Afife Theater: "The Most Prosperous Actor of the Year" – Kara Sohbet-2006
- 23rd International Istanbul Film Festival: "The Best Actor" Inşaat-2004

== Theater ==
As actor

- 1000 Nihayet Bitti: Peter Turrini – Duru Tiyatro – 2016
- Sondan Sonra : Dennis Kelly – Duru Tiyatro – 2010
- Ask Her Yerde : Simon Williams – Duru Tiyatro – 2008
- Bir Mutfak Masali : Kerstin Specht – Bakirköy Belediye Tiyatrolari – 2007
- Kara Sohbet : Amélie Nothomb – Duru Tiyatro – 2006
- Sinir : Muzaffer Izgi – Bakirköy Belediye Tiyatrolari – 2005
- Lütfen Kizimla Evlenir misiniz : Muzaffer Izgi – Bakirköy Belediye Tiyatrolari – 2005
- Ikinci Caddeninin Mahkumu : Neil Simon – Bakirköy Belediye Tiyatrolari – 2002
- Rumuz Goncagül : Oktay Arayici – Bakirköy Belediye Tiyatrolari – 1999
- Bir Cinayet Söylencesi : Melih Cevdet Anday – Bakirköy Belediye Tiyatrolari – 1999
- Kuzguncuklu Fazilet : Yilmaz Karakoyunlu – Bakirköy Belediye Tiyatrolari
- Bozuk Düzen : Dinçer Sümer – Bakirköy Belediye Tiyatrolari – 1998
- Simyaci : Paulo Coelho – Dostlar Tiyatrosu – 1997
- Baris : Aristopfanes : Bakirköy Belediye Tiyatrolari – 1993
- Sofokles'in Antigone'si : Bertolt Brecht – Bakirköy Belediye Tiyatrolari
- Firtina : William Shakespeare – Istanbul Devlet Tiyatrosu – 1991
- Yuzlesme : [Graham Farrow[] - [Duru Tiyatro Istanbul 2018/19

As director

- Nafile Dünya : Oktay Arayici – Duru Tiyatro – 2012
- Tatli Çarsamba : Muriel Resnik – Duru Tiyatro – 2011
- Sondan Sonra : Dennis Kelly – Duru Tiyatro – 2010
- Ask Her Yerde : Simon Williams – Duru Tiyatro – 2008
- Bir Mutfak Masali : Kerstin Specht – Bakirköy Belediye Tiyatrolari – 2007
- Ikinci Caddenin Mahkumu : Neil Simon – Bakirköy Belediye Tiyatrolari – 2002

== Filmography ==
Production	Year	Character
Zübeyde: Analar Oğullar	2023	Ragıp Bey
Yol Arkadaşım	2017	Fevzi
İnşaat 2	2014	Ali
Günesi Gördüm	2009	Musto
Dün Gece Bir Rüya Gördüm	2006	
Kurtlar İmparatorluğu	2005	Le policier
Okul	2003	Religoun Teacher Kemal
İnşaat	2003	Ali

=== Series ===
Production	Year	Character
Dönence	2023–	Cem
Tozluyaka	2022	Kenan Yağızoğlu
Son Nefesime Kadar	2022	Ferzan
Ramo	2021	Şerif
Bir Annenin Günahı	2020	Çetin
Kırmızı Oda	2020	Ahmet
Sevgili Geçmiş	2019	Cemal Karalar
Vurgun	2019	Vedat
Kara Yazı	2017	Halil
Sevda'nın Bahçesi	2017	Levent
Güneşin Kızları	2015–2016	Haluk Mertoğlu
Ulan İstanbul	2014	Firuz/Ahmet Yılmaz
Sil Baştan	2014	Yiğit
Güneşi Beklerken	2014	Cihan Güzel
Ustura Kemal	2012	Commander Bennet
Dürüye'nin Güğümleri	2010–2011	Zühtü Gülbayır
Aile Reisi	2009–2010	
Ah Kalbim	2009	Atilla
İki Aile	2006–2008	Oğuz Karaman
Kamyon	2006	
Seni Çok Özledim	2005	Kenan
Sen misin Değil misin?	2005	
Ölümüne Sevdalar	2005	Murat Kaptan
İstanbul Şahidimdir	2004	Aslan Fırat
Baba	2003	Yıldırım
Esir Şehrin İnsanları	2003	Mister Kamil
Berivan	2002	Ferhat
Yeditepe İstanbul	2001	Yusuf
Yüzleşme	1999	Kadir
Yılan Hikayesi	1999	Erkan
