= Engin Cezzar =

Turkish actor

- Born: 25 March 1935; Istanbul, Turkey
- Died: 26 January 2017 (aged 81); Istanbul, Turkey
- Other names: Keşanlı Ali (after the play Keşanlı Ali Destanı)
- Occupation(s): Actor, director
- Spouse: Gülriz Sururi (1968–1997; 1999–2017)
- Awards: 1990 Sedat Simavi Radio-Television Award; 2003 Muhsin Ertuğrul Special Award; 2008 International Istanbul Theatre Festival Honorary Award

Hüsnü Engin Cezzar (25 March 1935 – 26 January 2017) was a Turkish director, and stage, movie and TV actor.

Cezzar, who started acting in Istanbul City Theatres with the role of "Hamlet", had the title of the youngest actor ever to portray this character in the world. He performed many plays in the theater community he founded with his wife Gülriz Sururi in 1962 and took the lead role in many of them. His name has become synonymous with the character of Keşanlı Ali in the musical Keşanlı Ali Destanı by Haldun Taner, in which Cezzar had the leading role. He was one of the oldest friends of James Baldwin.

== Life ==
Cezzar was born in Istanbul in 1935. After finishing primary school, he continued his education at Robert College. Upon his interest in theater, which started at Robert College, he studied at the Theater department of Yale University in the US and at the Actors Studio Theater School. In 1958, he played the leading role in Franz Kafka's The Warden of the Tomb, which premiered at the Piscator Workshop theater.

He returned to Turkey in 1959 and began acting in the role of "Hamlet" at the Istanbul City Theatre. Having gained a reputation with this performance, Cezzar became the youngest artist ever to play the role of Hamlet, and appeared in this role over 169 times. He later worked in Dormen Theatre, Devekuşu Cabaret, Istanbul State Theatre, and Antalya State Theatre. In 1968, he married stage actress Gülriz Sururi.

Cezzar, who also appeared in movies and TV series, played in the series Bay Alkolü Takdimimdir for TRT in 1985. He also directed and produced the series Kaldırım Serçesi in 1989. For his role in Kaldırım Serçesi, he won the Sedat Simavi Radio-Television Award.

For his lifelong contributions to theatre art, Cezzar and his wife Gülriz Sururi received the 2003 Muhsin Ertuğrul Special Award at the 7th Afife Theatre Awards. In 2008, he was honored at the International Istanbul Theatre Festival with an honorary award.

Cezzar, who suffered a stroke in 2011, died on 26 January 2017. According to his will, he was buried in Çatalca following a private ceremony.

== Theatre ==
=== As actor ===
- Boy Gets Girl (Rebecca Gilman, Talimhane Theatre, 2008)
- The Lower Depths (Maxim Gorky, Istanbul State Theatre, 2002)
- Teneke (Yaşar Kemal, Gülriz Sururi-Engin Cezzar Theatre)
- Keşanlı Ali Destanı (Haldun Taner, Gülriz Sururi-Engin Cezzar Theatre)
- Midas'ın Kulakları (Güngör Dilmen, Gülriz Sururi-Engin Cezzar Theatre)
- Canlı Maymun Lokantası (Güngör Dilmen, Gülriz Sururi-Engin Cezzar Theatre)
- Othello (William Shakespeare, Istanbul City Theatre)
- Hamlet (William Shakespeare, Istanbul City Theatres)

=== As director ===
- Ayşe (operetta) : Muhlis Sabahattin - Gülriz Sururi-Engin Cezzar Theatre - 2005
- Bir Şehnaz Oyun : Turgut Özakman - Bursa State Theatre - 1998
- Kadı : Ülkü Tamer - Istanbul State Theatre - 1996
- New Woman : Barbara Schottenfeld - Istanbul State Theatre - 1992
- The Idiot : Fyodor Dostoyevski - Istanbul State Theatre - 1990
- Yalan Dünya : Haldun Taner\Umur Bugay\Ferhan Şensoy - Devekuşu Cabaret - 1976
- Yalan Dünya : Haldun Taner\Zeki Alasya\Umur Bugay\Ferhan Şensoy - Gülriz Sururi - Devekuşu Cabaret - 1975
- A Hatful of Rain : Michael V. Gazzo - Gülriz Sururi-Engin Cezzar Theatre - 1974
- Trap : Lucille Fletcher - Gülriz Sururi-Engin Cezzar Theatre - 1973
- My Family Right or Wrong : Ephraim Kishon - Gülriz Sururi-Engin Cezzar Theatre - 1972
- Vamos a contar mentiras : Alfonso Paso - Gülriz Sururi-Engin Cezzar Theatre - 1972
- Us Women : Leck Fischer - Gülriz Sururi-Engin Cezzar Theatre - 1972
- That Summer, That Fall : Frank D. Gilroy - Gülriz Sururi-Engin Cezzar Theatre - 1971
- Cicada : Alfonso Paso - Gülriz Sururi-Engin Cezzar Theatre - 1971

== Filmography ==
- Sağır Oda - 2006
- Abdülhamit Düşerken - 2002 (Said Pasha)
- Hızır Bey - 2000
- Kaldırım Serçesi - 1989
- Keşanlı Ali Destanı - 1988
- Bay Alkolü Takdimimdir - 1981
