= Ülkü Hilal Çiftçi =

Turkish actress and singer (born 2009)

- Born: 11 January 2009 (age 17); Devrek, Zonguldak, Turkey
- Occupations: Actress, singer
- Years active: 2012–present
- Known for: İnci Taneleri – Ayça

Ülkü Hilal Çiftçi (born 11 January 2009) is a Turkish actress and singer. She began her career at a young age, appearing in commercials before moving on to television series, films, and music. She is best known for her role as Ayça in the 2024 television series İnci Taneleri, which brought her widespread recognition and critical acclaim.

== Early life and education ==
Ülkü Hilal Çiftçi was born on 11 January 2009 in Devrek, Zonguldak, Turkey, to parents Ünal and Kader Çiftçi. She has two sisters, Gökçen Bilge and Aysima.

Çiftçi started acting in commercials at the age of four. She later moved to Istanbul with her family, where she continues her education while pursuing her career in acting and music.

== Career ==
=== Early television work ===
Çiftçi made her television debut in 2012 with a role in the series İki Dünya Arasında, followed by an appearance in the popular series Arka Sokaklar in 2013. She subsequently appeared in several well-known Turkish television series as a child actress, including Karadayı, Kırgın Çiçekler, Tozkoparan İskender, Gülümse Kaderine, and Dönence.

=== Breakthrough role ===
Her breakthrough role came with the 2024 series İnci Taneleri, where she portrayed the character Ayça, alongside Yılmaz Erdoğan. Çiftçi's performance in the role received media attention, and it increased her visibility in Turkish television.

=== Commercial work ===
Apart from acting, Çiftçi has appeared in advertisements for several brands, including Sleepy, Fiat Egea, Garanti Bankası, Michelin, and Ariel.

== Music career ==
Çiftçi has started a music career, releasing singles on streaming platforms including Apple Music. She has appeared on television music programs, including O Ses Türkiye (The Voice Turkey) during a New Year's special episode.

== Personal life ==
Çiftçi has stated her interest in traditional Turkish music, particularly the works of arabesk singer Ferdi Tayfur. In interviews, she has mentioned Tayfur's influence on her artistic interests. Following Tayfur's death in January 2025, she posted a tribute on social media, writing: "I grew up watching his films and listening to his songs... Even though I'm still quite young, being able to understand what he wrote and did is a great privilege for me. We love you so much. As you said, 'Even if you go one day, your memory is enough,' your memory is enough."

In a 2024 interview, Çiftçi expressed her views on career choices, stating: "I don't believe in such a thing as 'let your golden bracelet be on your arm.' Because we come to this life only once and I think people should do what they are inclined towards or what they love to do."

== Awards and recognition ==
Ülkü Hilal Çiftçi's performance in İnci Taneleri received coverage within the Turkish entertainment industry. In 2025, she attended the 26th Sadri Alışık Awards, where her appearance was reported in media outlets.

In 2023, she was nominated for the Best Child Actor (En İyi Çocuk Oyuncu) award at the 49th Golden Butterfly Awards (Altın Kelebek Ödülleri) for her role in Dönence.

== Filmography ==
Year	Title	Role	Type	Episodes
2026	Yeraltı	Melek Aslan	TV series	5+
2024–2026	İnci Taneleri	Ayça	TV series	37+
2024	Kayıp Kamyon	Zeynep	Movie	—
2023	Dönence	Gülce Olgun	TV series	14
2022	Gülümse Kaderine	Damla	TV series	5
2021	Tozkoparan: İskender	Duygu	TV series	26
2019	Bir Litre Gözyaşı	Eda Yürekli	TV series	2
2018	İyi Oyun	Ceren	Movie	—
2018	Adı: Zehra	Mine Kurdoğlu	TV series	14
2018	Bizim Köyün Şarkısı	Girls' Music Group Vocalist	Movie	—
2017	Nerdesin Birader?	Duygu	TV series	4
2016–2017	O Hayat Benim	Cimcime	TV series	31
2017	Sahipli	Büşra (child)	TV series	2
2016	Arkadaşlar İyidir	Derin	TV series	10
2016	Siccin 3: Cürmü Aşk	Elif	Movie	—
2016–2017	Güldüy Güldüy Show: Çocuk	Various roles	TV series	—
2016	Göç Zamanı	—	TV series	15
2016	Sessiz Yalanlar	Young Ceren	Movie	—
2015–2017	Kırgın Çiçekler	Gülcan	TV series	27
2014–2015	Karadayı	Zeynep	TV series	26
2015	Sen Benimsin	—	TV series	—
2015	Kara Kutu	Şirin	TV series	1
2014	Elif	Melek	TV series	75
2013	Arka Sokaklar	Duru	TV series	1
2012	İki Dünya Arasında	Elif	TV series	38
