= Mutlu Konuk Blasing =

Turkish-American poetry critic and translator (1944–2021)

- Born: 1944
- Died: 2021 (aged 76–77)
- Occupation: Literary critic, translator
- Employer: Brown University

Mutlu Konuk Blasing (1944–2021) was a Turkish-American poetry critic and translator, Professor Emerita of English at Brown University. As well as four books on American poetry, she published ten books of translation and a biography of the Turkish poet Nâzım Hikmet.

== Life ==
Mutlu Konuk was born on June 27, 1944. She married the poet and translator Randy Blasing. In the mid-1970s, the pair started spending summers in Turkey translating the work of Nâzım Hikmet together. She died in her summer home in Turkey on August 16, 2021.

== Works ==
- (tr. with Randy Blasing) Things I didn't know I loved : selected poems of Nazim Hikmet by Nâzım Hikmet. 1975.
- (tr. with Randy Blasing) The epic of Sheik Bedreddin and other poems by Nâzım Hikmet. 1977.
- The art of life : studies in American autobiographical literature. 1977.
- American poetry--the rhetoric of its forms. 1980.
- (tr. with Randy Blasing) Rubáiyát by Nâzım Hikmet. 1985.
- (tr. with Randy Blasing) Selected poetry by Nâzım Hikmet. 1986.
- (tr. with Randy Blasing) Human landscapes from my country : an epic novel in verse by Nâzım Hikmet. 1982.
- (tr. with Randy Blasing) Poems of Nazim Hikmet by Nâzım Hikmet. 1994.
- Politics and form in postmodern poetry : O'Hara, Bishop, Ashbery, and Merrill. 1995.
- Lyric poetry : the pain and the pleasure of words. 2006.
- Nâzım Hikmet : the life and times of Turkey's world poet. 2013.
- (tr.) Life's good, brother : a novel by Nâzım Hikmet. 2013.
- (tr. with Randy Blasing) Letters to Taranta-Babu : a poem by Nâzım Hikmet. 2013.
