= Gülriz Sururi =

Turkish drama actress and author (1929–2018)

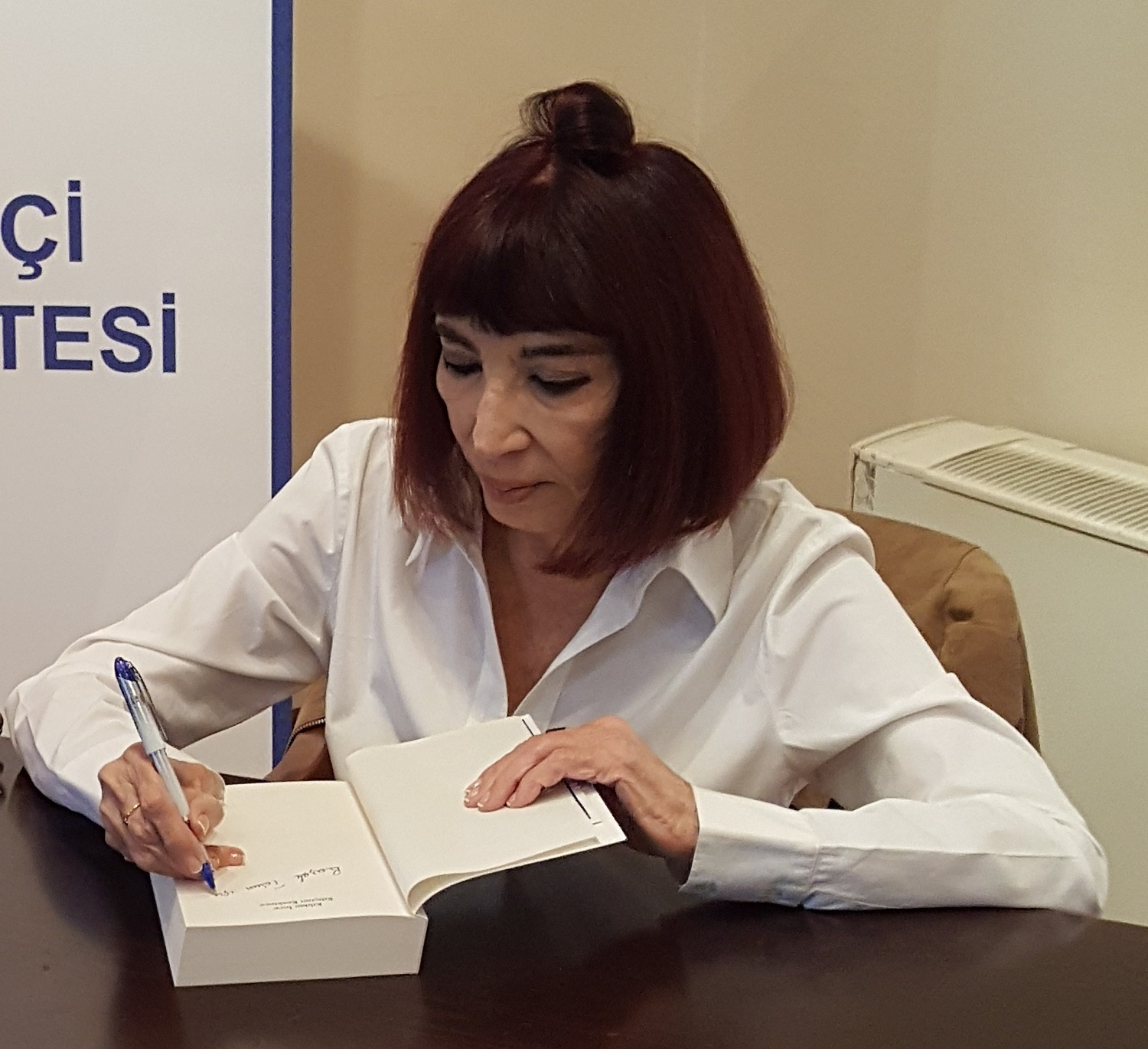
- Gülriz Sururi (November 2016)
- Born: 24 July 1927; Istanbul, Turkey
- Died: 31 December 2018 (aged 89); Istanbul, Turkey
- Occupation: Drama actress
- Years active: 1942–1999
- Spouse: Engin Cezzar (1961–1986; 1999–2017, his death)

Gülriz Sururi (24 July 1929 – 31 December 2018) was a Turkish drama actress and author. She presented a TV cooking show and co-owned a theatre.

== Biography ==
She was born in Istanbul, Turkey on 24 July 1929. Her father Lütfullah was the founder of the first Turkish Musical theatre and her mother Suzan was a prima donna.

She studied acting and singing at the Municipal Conservatoire of Istanbul. In 1942, she began her drama career at the Children's Section of the City Theatre of Istanbul accepting the advice of the theatre director Muhsin Ertuğrul (1892–1979). In 1955, she took the stage at Muammer Karaca Theatre. Sururi transferred to Haldun Dormen Theatre in 1960. In 1962, she founded with Engin Cezzar their own theatre bearing their names. She and Cezzar hosted James Baldwin in Istanbul.

She was named "The Woman of the Year" by the Turkish Women's Association in 1966. On 18 September 1968, she married Engin Cezzar. In the 1990s, she presented five years long a cooking show A La Luna in the television channel TRT. In 1998, she was given the honorary title of state artist by the Ministry of Culture. She ended her acting career after the play Söyleyeceklerim Var in 1999.

Sururi died after suffering from digestive system problems on 31 December 2018. She was survived by her foster daughter, Zeynep Miraç Özkartal. According to her last will, her death was announced after a silent funeral service.

== Theatre ==
=== Actor ===
Some of her performances were:

- 1997 Söyleyeceklerim Var (1999) – Gülriz Sururi-Engin Cezzar Theatre
- 1983 Kaldırım Serçesi (by Başar Sabuncu from Edith Piaf's autobiography) – Gülriz Sururi-Engin Cezzar Theatre
- 1980 Kabare (by Joe Masteroff) – Gülriz Sururi-Engin Cezzar Theatre
- Ferhat İle Şirin – Gülriz Sururi-Engin Cezzar Theatre
- 1966 Teneke (by Yaşar Kemal) – Gülriz Sururi-Engin Cezzar Theatre
- 1963 Keşanlı Ali Destanı (by Haldun Taner) – Gülriz Sururi-Engin Cezzar Theatre
- Zilli Zarife – Gülriz Sururi-Engin Cezzar Theatre
- 1961 Sokak Kızı İrma (by Alexandre Breffort, Marguerite Monnot) – Dormen Theatre
- 1959 Sözde Melekler – Dormen Theatre

=== Director ===
She directed the following plays:

- Kısmet ("Chance") (play) – State Theatre of Adana
- Fosforlu Cevriye ("Cevriye the Luminous") (musical) – State Theatre of Ankara
- Biz Sıfırdan Başladık ("We Started from Scratch") – Konçinalar Company

== Bibliography ==
Her books are:

- Kıldan İnce Kılıçtan Keskince ("Thinner than the Hair, Sharper than the Sword") (1978) (memoir)
- Biz Kadınlar ("We Women") (1987) (essay)
- Bir An Gelir ("The Moment Comes") (2003) (memoir)
- Girmediğim Sokaklarda ("In The Streets I've Never Been To") (2003) (story)
- Gülriz'in Mutfağından ("From Gülriz's Cuisine") (2003) (cook book)
- Seni Seviyorum ("I love You") (2004) (novel)
