= List of Turkish films before 1960 =

A list of films produced in Turkey before 1960:

== 1914–1922 (Ottoman Empire) ==
Title	Director	Cast	Genre	Notes
1914
Ayastefanos'taki Rus Abidesinin Yıkılışı	Fuat Uzkınay		Documentary	IMDb Sinematürk First Turkish movie, black and white, silent
1916
Himmet ağanın izdivacı	Fuat Uzkınay, Sigmund Weinberg		Comedy	
1919
Istırap/Samson	Muhsin Ertuğrul			
1921
Bican Efendi Vekilharç				
1922
İstanbul'da ıstırap	Muhsin Ertuğrul			
İstanbul'da Bir Facia-i Aşk	Muhsin Ertuğrul	Behzat Butak; Anna Mariyeviç	Drama, Crime	IMDb Sinematürk
Boğaziçi esrarı	Muhsin Ertuğrul		Drama, Crime	

== 1923–1929 Silent Films (Turkey Republic) ==
Title	Director	Cast	Genre	Notes
1923
Zafer Yollarında	Fuat Uzkınay		Documentary	
Kız Kulesi'nde bir facia	Muhsin Ertuğrul			
Ateşten Gömlek	Muhsin Ertuğrul	Muhsin Ertuğrul, Bedia Muvahhit, Neyyire Neyir	Drama, War	Based on the novel by Halide Edib Adıvar
Leblebici Horhor	Muhsin Ertuğrul	Behzat Butak; Helena Artinova	Musical	IMDb Sinematürk
1924
Sözde kızlar	Muhsin Ertuğrul		Drama	Based on a novel by Peyami Safa
1928
Bir sigara yüzünden	Muhsin Ertuğrul		Comedy, short	
Ankara postası	Muhsin Ertuğrul		Drama War	
1929
Kaçakçılar	Muhsin Ertuğrul		Crime, Drama	

== 1931–1946 Sound Films ==
Title	Director	Cast	Genre	Notes
1931
İstanbul Sokakları'nda	Muhsin Ertuğrul; İhsan İpekçi	Semiha Berksoy; Talat Artemel	Musical, Drama, Romance	
1932
Bir Millet Uyanıyor	Muhsin Ertuğrul		Drama, War	
1933
Söz bir, Allah bir	Muhsin Ertuğrul		Musical, Comedy	
Kakos dromos/Fena Yol	Muhsin Ertuğrul			written by Grigorios Xenopoulos
Karım beni aldatırsa	Muhsin Ertuğrul		Musical, Comedy	written by Nazım Hikmet
Naşit Dolandırıcı	Muhsin Ertuğrul		Short, Comedy	written by Nazım Hikmet
Cici berber	Muhsin Ertuğrul		Comedy	written by Nazım Hikmet
Kanlı Nigar/Düğün Gecesi	Nazım Hikmet		Theatre	written by Nazım Hikmet
Yeni Karagöz	Hazım Körmükçü		Short	written by Hazım Körmükçü
1934
Leblebici Horhor Ağa	Muhsin Ertuğrul			
Aysel Bataklı Damın Kızı	Muhsin Ertuğrul			
Milyon Avcıları	Muhsin Ertuğrul			written by Nazım Hikmet
1937
Güneşe Doğru	Nazım Hikmet			
1938
Aynaroz Kadısı	Muhsin Ertuğrul			
Doğan Çavuş	Avni Dilligil			
1939
Bir Kavuk Devrildi	Muhsin Ertuğrul			
Allah'ın Cenneti	Muhsin Ertuğrul			
Tosun Paşa	Muhsin Ertuğrul			
Taş Parçası	Faruk Kenç			
1940
Yılmaz Ali	Faruk Kenç			
Akasya Palas	Muhsin Ertuğrul			
Şehvet Kurbanı	Muhsin Ertuğrul			
Nasreddin Hoca Düğünde	Muhsin Ertuğrul			
1941
Nasreddin Hoca Düğünde	Muhsin Ertuğrul			
Kahveci Güzeli	Faruk Kenç			
1942
Kıskanç	Muhsin Ertuğrul			
Sürtük	Adolf Körner			
Kerem ile Aslı	Adolf Körner			
Duvaksız Gelin	Adolf Körner			
1943
Dertli Pınar	Faruk Kenç			
1944
Günahsızlar	Faruk Kenç			
Hasret	Faruk Kenç			
Hürriyet Apartmanı				
Deniz Kızı				
1945
Yayla Kartalı	Muhsin Ertuğrul			
Köroğlu				
On Üç Kahraman				
1946
Kızılırmak/Karakoyun	Muhsin Ertuğrul			
Senede Bir Gün				
Sonsuz Acı				
Toros Çocuğu				
Harman Sonu/Köy Güzeli				

== 1947–1959 Early Yeşilçam Industry ==
In 1948, a 75% tax was levied on foreign films. An average of 60 films were produced per year. However, film warehouse burned down in 1959. Many films have not survived

Title	Director	Cast	Genre	Notes
1947
Yara	Seyfi Havaeri			
1953
Karanlık Dünya	Metin Erksan		Drama	Written by Bedri Rahmi Eyüboğlu
1954
Beyaz Cehennem/Cingöz Recai	Metin Erksan		Adventure, Crime	
Simal yıldızı	Atıf Yılmaz		Korean War	
1955
Yolpalas Cinayeti	Metin Erksan			
Kanlarıyla Ödediler	Osman F. Seden			
1956
Ölmüş bir kadının evrakı metrukesi	Metin Erksan		Drama, Romance	
Sönen yıldız	Osman F. Seden		Drama, Romance	
İntikam Alevi	Osman F. Seden	Ayhan Işık	Drama	
1957
Bir Avuç Toprak	Osman F. Seden		Based on Novel	
Berduş	Osman F. Seden	Zeki Müren	Romance, Comedy, Drama	
1958
Dokuz Dağın Efesi	Metin Erksan			
Beraber ölelim	Osman F. Seden			
Altın Kafes	Osman F. Seden		Drama, Romance	
1959
Hicran yarası	Metin Erksan			
Kırık Plak	Osman F. Seden		Drama, Romance	
Gurbet	Osman F. Seden	Zeki Müren	Drama	
Düşman Yolları Kesti	Osman F. Seden	Eşref Kolçak, Sadri Alışık, Nurhan Nur	Drama, War	
Cilalı İbo Yıldızlar Arasında	Osman F. Seden	Feridun Karakaya	Comedy	
