= Âşık Veysel =

Turkish poet (1894–1973)

- Photograph of Âşık Veysel, c. 1950

Background information
- Born: Veysel Şatıroğlu; 25 October 1894; Sivrialan, Şarkışla, Sivas, Ottoman Empire
- Died: 21 March 1973 (aged 78) Sivrialan, Şarkışla, Sivas, Turkey
- Genres: Turkish folk music
- Occupations: Ashik; poet
- Instrument: Bağlama (saz • cura)
- Years active: 1894–1973
- Spouses: Esma Sengül (m. 1919); Gülizar Ana (m. 1927)

Âşık Veysel (Turkish: [aːˈʃɯk vejˈsæl]; born Veysel Şatıroğlu (Turkish: [ʃaːˈtɯɾ.oːɫu]); 25 October 1894 – 21 March 1973) was a Turkish Alevi ashik, bağlama virtuoso, and folk poet. He was born and died in the village of Sivrialan, Sivas Province, in the Ottoman Empire (later Turkey). Blind since the age of 7, Veysel's songs were typically melancholic, and dealt with a range of themes revolving around morality, love, faith, life and death, patriotism, nature, and his own perception of the world as a blind man.

Veysel is considered one of the most prominent icons of Turkish folk music and literature. Among his most popular folk songs are Uzun İnce Bir Yoldayım (Turkish: I'm on a Long and Narrow Road); "Black Earth" (Kara Toprak); "Let My Friends Remember Me" (Dostlar Beni Hatırlasın) and "Your Beauty is Worth Nothing" (Güzelliğin On Para Etmez). In 2022, Veysel was posthumously awarded a Presidential Culture and Arts Grand Award by the Turkish President Recep Tayyip Erdoğan, in the "loyalty" category. In 2023, on the 50th anniversary of his death, Veysel was recommended to UNESCO for a year of commemoration, backed by Turkey, Azerbaijan, Hungary, Kazakhstan, Kyrgyzstan, North Macedonia, Ukraine, and Uzbekistan. His 123rd birthday was commemorated in a Google Doodle on October 25, 2017.

== Family ==
Veysel Şatıroğlu was born in Sivrialan, an Anatolian village in Sivas Province, in late 1894, the son of Gülizar Keçecigillerden and "Karaca" Ahmet Şatıroğlu, a farmer. He was his parents' fifth child. These included two elder sisters, both of whom died in infancy of smallpox; and two brothers, one of whom died in infancy, and the other in a childhood accident. Only one brother, Ali, survived to adulthood. In 1896, Veysel's birth was followed by that of a younger sister, Elif.

His family were Alevis, whose ancestors migrated to Anatolia from Turkestan sometime during the 17-18th centuries. Initially settling in the Kars region of Anatolia, the family later moved to Divriği, eventually settling in Sivrialan when Veysel's grandfather Ali Şatıroğlu, or his great-grandfather İbrahim Şatıroğlu, migrated there from the village of Kaledibi. Karaca Ahmet, Veysel's father, was orphaned at a young age, and grew up in Sivrialan as a shepherd and farmer.

The family surname was initially Ulu, although the descendants of Ahmet Karaca were known as the "Şatıroğulları", a nickname, since at least the time of Veysel's birth. The surname was legally changed in 1934 to Şatıroğlu, after the passage of the Turkish Surname Law in that same year.

== Childhood: 1894–1906 ==
Veysel's exact date of birth is disputed. It is typically given as 25 October, but the precise day is unknown; the best estimates suggest he was born in the autumn of 1894. He spent his entire childhood in his home village of Sivrialan, where his father's family, known as the Şatıroğulları, resided in four small houses overlooking the surrounding mountains.

=== Birth and naming ===
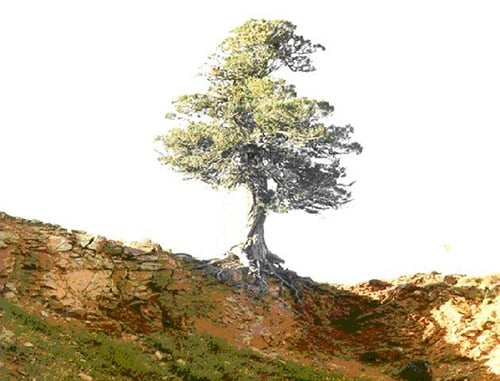
Sacred juniper tree at Mount Beserek, near Sivrialan, where prayers for healing were offered

According to Veysel's mother, Gülizar, she gave birth to Veysel on the way home from milking sheep, in a nearby pasture known as Ayipınarı. Unable to return home in time, she delivered Veysel by the roadside and cut the umbilical cord herself, using a rock, then wrapped up the infant and walked back to Sivrialan (known as Söbüalan at the time).

As all but one of Gülizar and Ahmet's previous children had died of smallpox, their newborn son was taken to Mount Beserek, a sacred mountain located approximately 10 km (6.21 miles) from Sivrialan. The mountain is thought to have healing properties; according to local folklore, Mount Beserek was the site where the 6th century Islamic martyr Owais al-Qarani (Turkish: Veysel Karanî), found some camels he had previously lost in Syria. Al-Qarani was martyred in the Battle of Siffin, where he had fought for another prominent Islamic figure, Ali ibn Abi Talib. In light of this, Ahmet and Gülizar named their newborn son Veysel, believing this name would compliment that of their older son, Ali Şatıroğlu.

=== Blindness ===
In later interviews, Veysel described his earliest childhood as being happy. In his own words, he recollected, "until the age of seven I ran and played and had fun like everybody else." Veysel had a fine voice from a young age, and from the age of 3 or 4 was frequently asked to sing.

Of his father, Karaca Ahmet, Veysel recalled:

Şu kadarını hatırlıyorum ki. Güneşin ışıklarını tutmaya çalışırdım. Babam “Avuçla oğlum, bana getir.” derdi. Ben de oynaya zıplaya avuçlayıp babama getirirdim. Avucumu açıp verecek bir şey bulamayınca hayret ederdim. Köy yerinin eğlencesinden ne olacak; babam beni bu şekilde eglendirirdi.
I remember this much. I used to try to hold the rays of the sun. My father would say, "Catch it, son, bring it to me." I would jump up and down and grab it and bring it to my father. I would open my palm and marvel when I couldn't find anything to give him. That is the fun of the village; this is how my father used to entertain me.

— Âşık Veysel

Smallpox was prolific in the region, and struck Sivas in the winter of 1901. Veysel, aged 7, had received a new robe (an entari) from his mother, and went to a nearby house to show it to Muhsine, the wife of his maternal uncle (Veysel's memory of this event was unreliable; in other recollections, he stated that had merely gone outside to play). It had recently rained in Sivrialan, and the road was saturated with mud and snow. On the way home, Veysel's foot slipped. He fell and bloodied his hand, and, after lying there for some time, got up and ran home in tears. It was discovered that he had developed a fever. Veysel was undressed and quickly put to bed. The next morning, he was unable to get up; it was soon discovered that Veysel too, had contracted smallpox.

Veysel was bedridden for three months. As the disease progressed, he developed a smallpox pustule in his left eye, which eventually caused a leakage that left him completely blind on that side. Veysel's right eye was spared, but quickly began to fail as well. He was left able only to perceive changes in light. By the time the pox eventually faded, Veysel was blind and scarred for the rest of his life, and needed to be led by the hand. His first guide was his sister Elif, who would frequently lead her brother around the village, describing to him what she saw.

Of this period in his life, Veysel said:

Çiçek zorlu geldi. Sol gözüme çiçek beyi çıktı. Sağ gözüme de, solun zorundan olacak, perde indi. O gün bu gündür dünya başıma zindan.
Smallpox came hard. A smallpox scar appeared in my left eye. Perhaps because of the difficulty of the left, a veil fell over my right eye. Ever since that day, the world has been a dungeon for me.
Genç Yaşımda Felek Vurdu Başıma

Genç yaşımda felek vurdu başıma
Aldırdım elimden iki gözümü
Yeni değmiş idim yedi yaşıma
Kayıb ettim baharımı yazımı.

When I was young, fate struck me
I had both my eyes taken from my hand
I had just reached the age of seven
I lost my spring and my summer.

—
Extract from "Genç Yaşımda Felek Vurdu Başıma"
Date unknown

At this stage, there remained hope that Veysel would be able to regain the use of his right eye. There were ophthalmologists in nearby Akdağmadeni, 71 km (44.1 miles) from Sivrialan, whose main function was to perform cataract surgery. Some years after Veysel had first contracted smallpox, itinerant ophthalmologists (locally referred to as "swallow servants", Turkish: kırlangıç uşakları) arrived in Sivrialan and examined Veysel's right eye. They informed Veysel's father, Karaca Ahmet, that cataract surgery would be able to restore the vision in that eye, but as they did not carry the necessary equipment, advised Ahmet to take Veysel to Sivas for surgery.

Conflicting accounts exist as to the sequence of events that followed. The most commonly cited version is the one recounted by Veysel in 1964, during an interview with TRT correspondent Rıdvan Çongur. In this recollection, Ahmet had planned to take Veysel to Akdağmadeni for surgery, but for one reason or another, was yet to make the trip. One day, Veysel was with his mother Gülizar, out milking their cows. Ahmet came up behind them and called his son by name. Veysel, who had not realized his father was close by, turned around, and was accidentally pierced in the right eye by a cattle prod his father had been holding, thereby losing the remaining vision in that eye.

The second version of events also originates from Veysel. In this second recollection, first recounted in 1936 for the magazine Yedi Gün, Veysel was in the barn, feeding grass to one of the family's cows. The trip to Sivas was to take place in the next few days; Ahmet was poor, and had been saving up for the trip. However, when the cow suddenly moved its head, it pierced Veysel's right eye with the tip of its horn. Veysel recollected the incident similarly in 1969 for the newspaper Milliyet; in this retelling, the accident occurred in 1906, when Veysel was already 12 years old. Veysel stated that the cow's horn gouged out his eye, and that he ran outside screaming, attracting the attention of his father and some of the other villagers. Veysel understood from the adults' conversation that he would remain permanently blind in his right eye. According to Veysel, he and his father went to Sivas anyway, still hopeful that something could be done—there, Veysel was sat on a couch, and his right eye examined. A brief silence followed. Veysel, understanding that he would be blind for the rest of his life, began to weep.

The veracity of either version of events has not been proven. It is possible that the second story may not have been true, and may have been invented by Veysel to absolve his father of any possible blame for his blindness. However, this does not explain why Veysel related this story in 1936, but chose to default to the first version by as late as 1964. The most probable explanation is that Veysel simply did not remember. He told both versions of the story in various interviews throughout his life, and sometimes even mixed up his eyes (for instance, he would point to his left instead of his right eye as the one blinded by smallpox). When asked by an interviewer whether he remembered the days before he had gone blind, Veysel replied, "I don't remember. No. I was too young."

=== Introduction to the saz ===
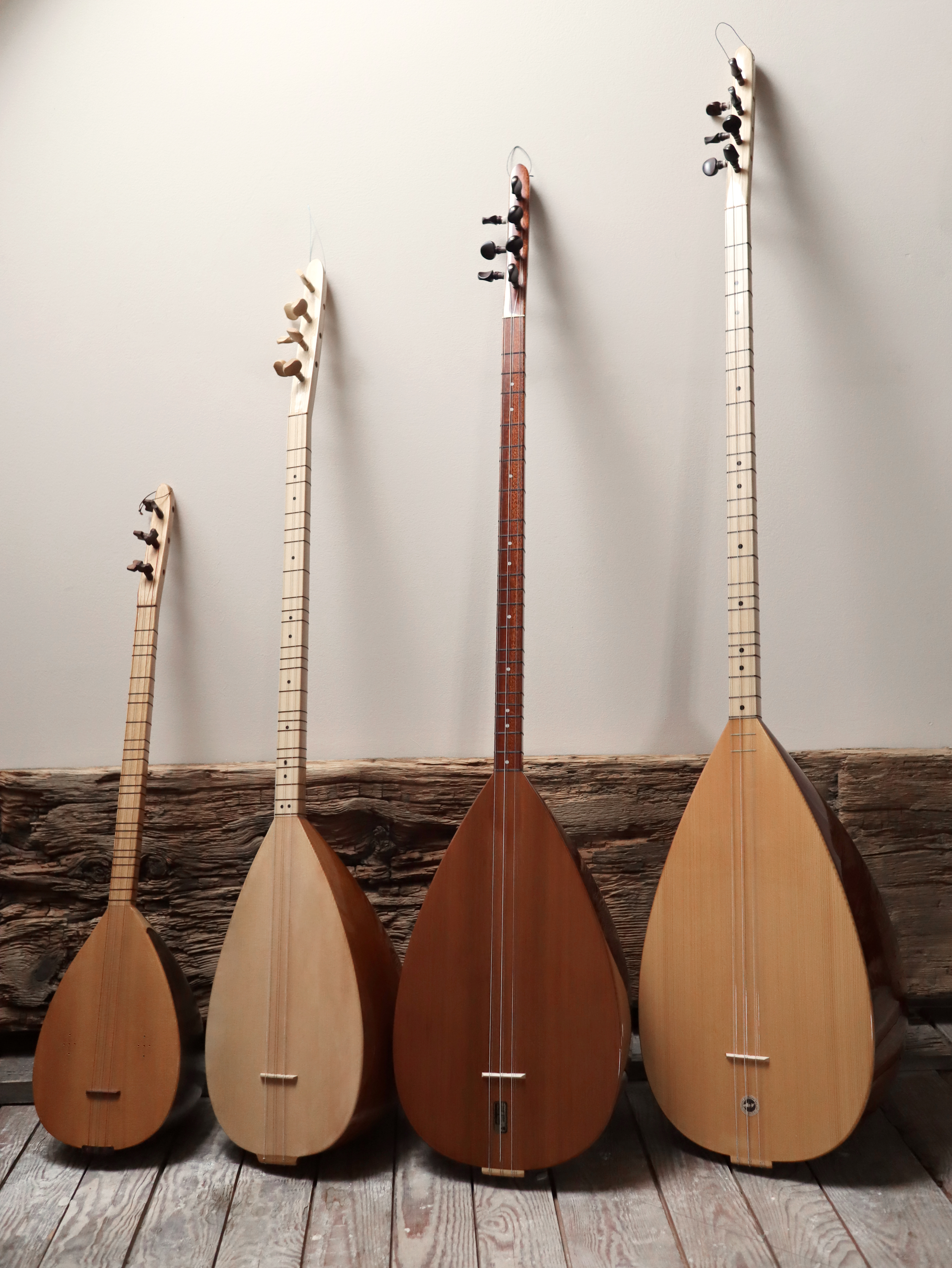
Four different sizes of bağlama, or saz. The terms are generally used interchangeably.

Veysel's blindness meant that he was unable to work a farm, one of the only professions in Sivrialan at the time. Unable to attend school, he never learned to read or write. Veysel's bitterness at being denied an education was lifelong, and he resigned himself to learning what he could of the alphabet and the surahs, from whatever schoolwork Veysel's brother Ali would recite aloud. The newly blinded Veysel relied on the support of his brother Ali and sister Elif, who helped him to walk and provided him with constant support. However, Veysel struggled to come to terms with his blindness, and became increasingly withdrawn.

Veysel's situation was a source of constant worry for his father, Ahmet, who feared that his own passing would leave no one to take care of Veysel. The Emlek region, by which the area around Sivrialan was known, was at the time a popular place for itinerant bards and ashiks to come and perform their compositions. Ahmet, who was interested in poetry, read Veysel poems in an effort to console him.

In 1904 or 1905, Ahmet made a trip to the village of Ortaköy, 21 km from Şarkışla. At the Mustafa Kemal lodge in Ortaköy, Ahmet discussed his worries with one Hakkı Baba, who gave Ahmet a broken three-stringed saz, which Ahmet later gave to Veysel. Asking what the instrument was, Veysel was told that the saz was a gift to keep him entertained.

Veysel first took saz lessons from a neighbour, Molla Hüseyin, who also tuned and replaced any broken strings. However, whilst he enjoyed the saz's sound, Veysel initially found it too difficult to learn, and tried to throw the instrument aside. Ahmet, in contrast, was adamant that his son learn; Veysel, who could not plow, sow, or harvest, but who had a fine voice, could use the saz as a way to earn a living. In a quote recounted decades later by Veysel himself, Ahmet had told his son:

Oğlum, biz ölürsek sana kim bakar? Mutlaka seni bir sanat sahibi yapmak istiyoruz. Sen ise sazdan başka ne iş yapabilirsin? Çift süremezsin, tohum ekemezsin, ekin biçemezsin... Bunu öğrenirsen köy odalarında, toplantılarda, kahvelerde çalarak ekmek paranı çıkarırsın.
My son, who will take care of you when we die? We want to make sure that you have a skill. What else can you do, besides play the saz? You can't farm, sow seeds, or harvest crops. If you learn this, you can earn a living by playing in village halls, meetings, and coffeehouses.

— Karaca Ahmet, Veysel's father

Though Veysel was initially reluctant, he understood his father's concerns, and he eventually began to learn the saz in earnest, also committing traditional folk songs and poems to memory, including the works of Yunus Emre, Pir Sultan Abdal, Karacaoğlan, Kemter Baba, Veli, Visali, Kul Abdal, Emrah, Tarsuslu Sıtkı, Şahan Ağa, and other great Alevi poets and ashiks of Anatolia. Veysel also listened to the works of other ashiks; his favourite was a friend and contemporary of his, Hıdır Dede, also from Sivrialan and about Veysel's age.

== Early years: 1906–1931 ==
First known photograph of Aşık Veysel, aged 37, taken at the Sivas Folk Poets Festival, 1931.

From about the age of 8, Veysel's education was continued by his father's friend, Çamışıhlı Ali Ağa, also called Âşık Ali. Ali, who lived in abject poverty, earned his living as an itinerant saz teacher, and would frequently obtain lodgings by staying in students' homes across the Emlek region. He came to Sivrialan around the winter of 1902 to 1904, when Veysel was 8 or 10 years old. At this time, Alevi religious gatherings and similar festivities were frequently held in Sivrialan, and Veysel often attended out of his love for music and conversation. At one such gathering, where Âşık Ali was present, the young Veysel was for unknown reasons expelled from the assembly with the invective, "get out, blind boy!" Such insults were common in Anatolian peasant villages, including Sivrialan; Veysel's nickname there was "Blind Veysel" (Turkish: Kör Veysel), and he was occasionally called "Blind Boy" (Turkish: Kör Oğlan) to his face, usually (though not always) as an insult, regardless of Veysel's personal feelings on the matter. In one account, though very poorly attested, the reason for Veysel's expulsion was that he had, in his intrigue and his blindness, gotten too close to the speaker at the gathering, and his unkempt and smallpox-ravaged appearance had offended one of the villagers, who allegedly slapped him. Regardless of the true reason, Âşık Ali took pity on Veysel. Ali made a saz and gave it to Veysel, then spent the year by Veysel's side, teaching him the basics.

Though he initially struggled with the saz, and though he felt that both Molla Hüseyin and Ali Ağa had to put considerable effort into teaching him, Veysel eventually came to enjoy it once he had learned how to tune his instrument on his own. Having learned to play saz proficiently by the age of 20, Veysel's early years were spent playing the saz predominantly for his entertainment alone.

=== First World War and War of Independence ===
Veysel was 20 years old when the First World War broke out on 28 July 1914. Three months later, on 31 October 1914, the Ottoman Empire officially entered the war. In the ensuing mobilization, all men of eligible age (20–45) were conscripted to the front, including most of Veysel's peers and his older brother Ali; however Veysel, though a staunch nationalist and desperate to fight, was obliged to stay home with his parents and saz. Veysel was devastated. He instantly fell into a deep depression that he self-described as one of the darkest periods of his life. Veysel was left behind yet again when the Turkish War of Independence broke out on 19 May 1919

Of this time in his life, Veysel reflected:

Gençlik yıllarımda en büyük üzüntüyü, Birinci Dünya Savaşı çıktığında yaşadım. Savaş başlayınca bütün köylü asker oldu. Benim emsallerim de askere gitti. Yirmi yaşında olduğum halde gözlerim görmediği için beni askere almadılar. Köyde yaşlı erkeklerle, kadınlarla başbaşa kaldım. Çok müteessir oldum. Çok üzüldüm. Çok çektim. Onlar memleket hizmetine gitti, ben köyde mahzun ve mahrum kaldım. Ben Allah'ın nasıl kuluyum ki, bundan, bu vatan hizmetinden mahrum kaldım diye düşünerek çok acı çektim. Sonra İstiklal Savaşı oldu. O yıllarda ben yine köydeydim. Bir iki yere gidip geldimse de önemsizdir.
I experienced the greatest sorrow of my youth when the First World War broke out. When the war started, all the villagers became soldiers. My peers also joined the army. Even though I was twenty years old, they did not enlist me because I couldn't see. I was left alone with the old men and women in the village. I was heartbroken. I was very upset, I suffered a lot. They went to the service of the country, and I remained sorrowful and deprived in the village. I suffered a lot, thinking, "What kind of servant of Allah am I, that I am deprived of this, this patriotic service?" Then there was the War of Independence. In those years, I was in the village again. Even if I have been to one or two places, it's insignificant.

Of his state of mind during this time, he also noted:

Eve girerim, yüzüm asık: anam babam halimi bilmez. Ben onlara derdimi, dokunmasın diye, açamam. Onlar benim kafa tuttuğumu zannederler, bense derdimi dökmekten çekinirim, öyle ki, sazdan bile farır gibi oldum
I enter the house, my face is sullen: my parents don't know how I feel. I cannot tell them my troubles, lest they are saddened. They think I am being defiant, but I am afraid to pour out my troubles, to the extent that I have even become distant from the saz.

To escape his sorrow, Veysel spent most of his time in the garden, sleeping under a pear tree. At night, he would climb into the treetops and sit there until morning. He began to carry his saz slung over his shoulder like a rifle, which his biographer and friend, Erdogan Alkan, speculated was homage to Veysel's ineligibility to fight; Veysel continued to carry his saz this way for the rest of his life. He also commemorated this period in his later poems.

With the end of the Turkish War of Independence in 1923, Ali returned home to Sivrialan, and Veysel was encouraged to pick up the saz again. Now of age and needing to support himself, this marked the first time that Veysel began to play the saz in a professional capacity; he started to earn a small living by playing in village cafes, and at weddings and holidays. Veysel stayed mostly within Sivrialan and nearby villages, as the saz was still perceived to be a shameful instrument, especially in big cities. Reportedly, Veysel could not be seen with his instrument without having it confiscated and burned by the authorities.

=== First marriage ===
Memlekete Destan Oldum (extract)

Memlekete destan oldum
Karım beni beğenmedi
Eşten oldum dosttan oldum
Yarim beni beğenmedi

Ne söylesem "deli" dedi
"Meyva vermez çalı" dedi
"Açma bana kolu" dedi
Sarım beni beğenmedi

I became a legend to my country
My wife didn't like me
I became a husband, a friend
My other half didn't like me

Whatever I said, she said, "crazy"
"The bush bears no fruit," she said
"Don't embrace me," she said
My love didn't like me

— Âşık Veysel, date unknown

By the end of the War, Veysel's parents were very old. Veysel was by now 25 years old. Continuing to worry about their younger son's future, Veysel's parents arranged a marriage for him with Esma, the daughter of a relative living in the village. Veysel had two children by Esma; their firstborn, Ali Şatıroğlu, died aged just 10 days, when he reportedly suffocated while Esma was breastfeeding him. Their second child was a daughter, named Elif.

According to most accounts, the marriage was unhappy, although the precise reason is unclear. Veysel remained markedly silent on the issue, though he suggested his poems that Esma thought he was crazy, and was cold to him. It is possible that he also blamed her for the death of their son. Veysel once fell asleep with his infant daughter beside him, and woke up horrified, thinking that he might have suffocated her if he had rolled over in his sleep.

Conversely, Esma accused Veysel of being grumpy and baselessly suspicious, and even alleged that Veysel had beaten her. Their mutual acquaintance, Veysel Kaymak, believed that Veysel had been jealous of Esma for being beautiful. He would purportedly conduct bizarre tests to prove Esma's loyalty to him; in one instance, Veysel hid an apple under Esma's pillow, then demanded to know who had put it there; he would climb onto the roof and throw stones down the chimney, then study Esma's reaction. They agreed only on one point—for, when asked what she thought of her husband, Esma stated, "he was crazy, crazy!"

Veysel's mother died on 24 February 1921, followed 8 months later by his father. The death of Gulizar hit Veysel especially hard; he would later compose a poem in her memory. This did not help the mood at home. Veysel and Esma's neighbour was a man named Hüseyin, the brother of a farmhand (ırgat) whom Veysel's brother Ali had hired after having a daughter of his own. Esma, feeling harassed by her own husband, would allegedly wait until Veysel had left the house, before going to spend time with Hüseyin.

Veysel began to become suspicious that Esma was having an affair. He apparently warned Esma about Hüseyin several times, though Esma always reassured her husband that nothing had happened between them, and asked Veysel "how could he think of such a thing?"

Esma soon fell in love with Hüseyin. One day, when Veysel was sick in bed and Ali was out collecting milkweed, Esma ran away with Hüseyin, leaving Veysel and his six-month-old daughter behind. Veysel continued to care for his daughter, but the child died at the age of two. Esma and Hüseyin, ultimately growing disillusioned with their escape, eventually returned to Sivrialan, and continued to reside there alongside Veysel. Veysel, on learning that Esma had returned, only asked if Esma was in need of anything, and would continue to make his relatives ask. Veysel later wrote a poem capturing his grief and anger towards Hüseyin, placing the blame on him for the death of Veysel's daughter.

According to a widespread story told about this time in Veysel's life, Veysel was fully aware that Esma intended to run away, but never let on that he knew. The story goes that during Esma and Hüseyin's escape, the lovers stopped to rest at a fountain near Bafra, in Samsun. Esma had been bothered by what she thought was a pebble in her shoe since leaving Sivrialan. Removing her sock, Esma found money inside, Veysel having stashed it there so that she would not be in want. Whilst this story is often related and was believed by Veysel's children and grandchildren, it is probably apocryphal.

The death of Veysel's parents, the end of his marriage, and the deaths of his children, led Veysel to consider leaving Sivrialan for the first time. In 1928, he resolved to make for Adana with his friend Ibrahim. On the way, they stopped at the village of Karaçayır, 22 km from Sivas. Veysel played the saz for a man there. Apparently deeply affected by the thought of Veysel's departure, the man, Deli Süleyman, begged Veysel not to leave, to such an extent that Veysel finally gave up the notion.

=== Second marriage ===
Having given up on Adana, Veysel began to make the journey back to Sivrialan. On the way, he passed through the Hafik District of Sivas. He bought a new saz for 9 lira in the village of Yalıncak, where he and his travelling companions were also swindled by gamblers. Yalıncak was notable for being the location of an important tomb, and Veysel, who had heard of the place from his father, wished to visit it. He stayed a few nights in a local inn (tekke), known as the Yalıncak Baba Lodge. At the time of Veysel's visit, the lodge was owned by one Hamza Ertemür, of the nearby village of Karayaprak. The lodge was maintained by members of Hamza's family. This included his granddaughter Gülizar, a widow, who was in charge of the cleaning, and who also assisted Veysel. He and his companions arrived on Nowruz day, when all the local lodges were closed and the local gendarmerie were on high alert; Gülizar, who opened the door to them, at first thought that Veysel's saz was a rifle. This marked Veysel's first time meeting Gülizar; however, Gülizar later recounted in interviews that she had had a dream in which she was visited by a 14th-century folk poet, who told her that she would be the one to spread Veysel's ashes. In other accounts, Gülizar purportedly had a dream in which she saw herself marrying Veysel.

After his stay in Yalıncak, Veysel returned to Sivrialan. Almost as soon as he had arrived there, Veysel dispatched a letter to the village where Gülizar lived, Karayaprak, bearing his proposal of marriage.

Both Gülizar and her father were initially hesitant to accept. This hesitance was entirely practical; Veysel's blindness meant that he could not mend fences, bring in the harvest, or perform other manual tasks. By her own admission, Gülizar was also hesitant to marry a blind man. Sivrialan was also very remote, about 136 km (83.9 miles) from Karayaprak on foot. However, Gülizar's grandfather Hamza came to Veysel's defense, arguing that the proposal must be divine will, and therefore, should not be opposed. Despite the continued protests of Gülizar's father, Hamza forwarded a letter of acceptance to Sivrialan. Veysel sent his brother Ali's wife, Yeter, and his aunt's son, İbrahim, to Karayaprak to fetch Gülizar, who married Veysel in that same year, sometime around March 1928. She took nothing with her to Sivrialan except for a sack of meat, signifying that Gülizar would bring only her person into the marriage; she was married without a dowry.

Gülizar and Veysel had seven children together, though their son, Hüseyin, died when he was a few months old. The marriage was happy, and lasted until Veysel's death. In a later conversation where her husband was present, Gülizar would note:

Benimle evleninceye kadar zorlu çarık çitirmiş bu Veysel. Kısmeti benimle açıldı. Hiç şiir söyleyemezken bülbül gibi ötmeye başladı.
Until he married me, this Veysel struggled hard. His fortune began with me. He started singing like a nightingale, when before he could never sing poetry.

— Gülizar Şatıroğlu, Veysel's wife

== Rise to fame: 1931–1935 ==
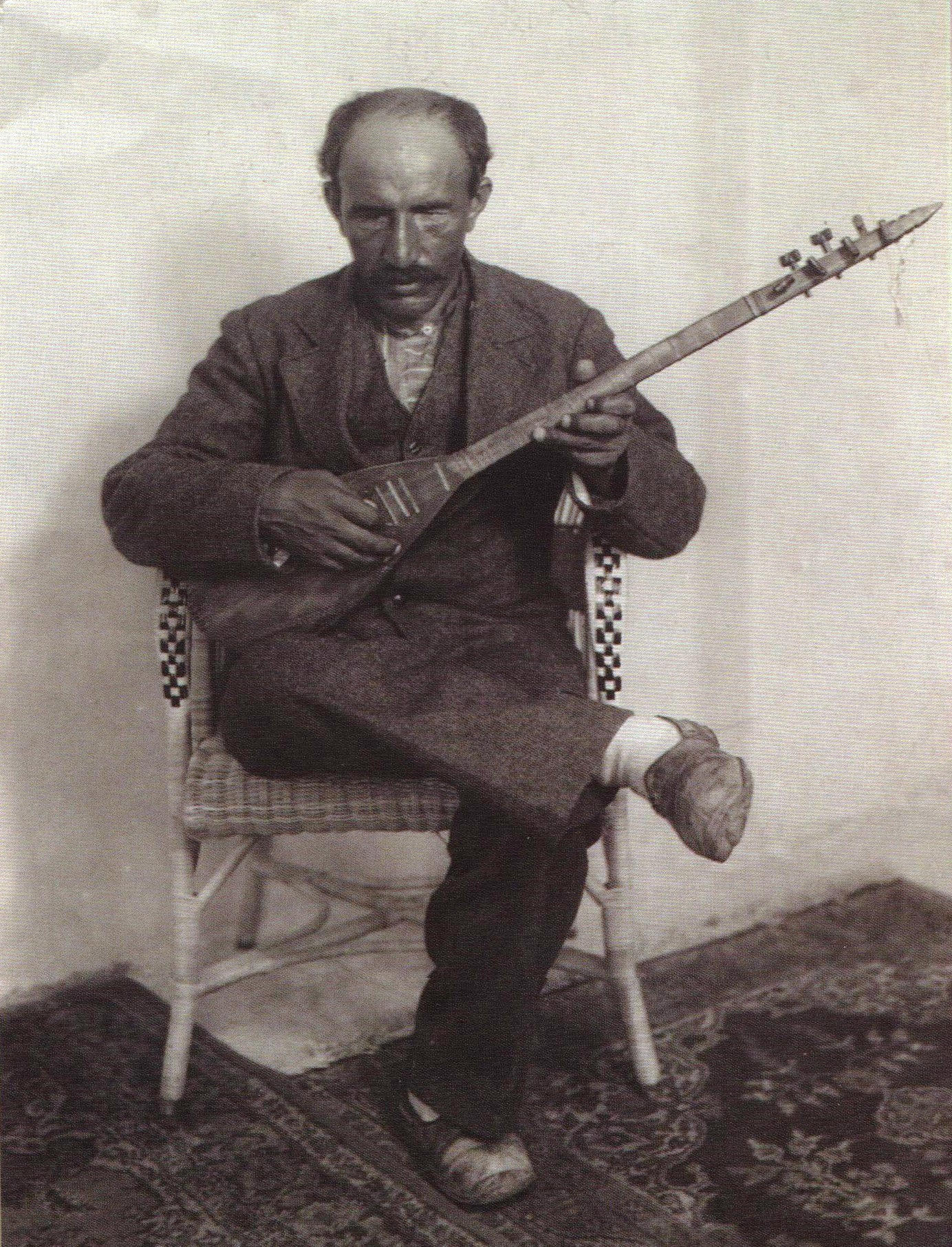
Veysel in 1935

Veysel's name first became known outside his local circle when he met Ahmet Kutsi Tecer in 1931. Tecer, himself a poet and a literature teacher in schools in Sivas and Ankara, recognized Veysel's skill with the saz, and was the key figure responsible for launching Veysel's name onto the national stage. In 1931, Tecer, alongside his colleagues Muzaffer Sarısözen and Vehbi Cem Aşkun, founded the Association for the Protection of Folk Poets, with Sivas' mayor, Osman Hikmet Işık, appointed as association president.

=== Sivas Folk Poets Festival ===
In the same year, 1931, Tecer's association organized the first Folk Poets Festival in Sivas, intended to showcase the work of local folk poets. There was some difficulty in finding minstrels to attend the event; it was a novelty, and folk poets at the time were not accustomed to performing in front of large audiences. Tecer and his colleagues launched a search for minstrels across Sivas, including in Sivrialan, where a few representatives visited Veysel's house. Reportedly, Veysel was shy. The presence of state officials in his home made him worry that something would happen to him, and Veysel instructed Gülizar to say that he was not at home. However, he was ultimately persuaded, and allegedly participated in the festival against the advice of the other villagers in Sivrialan.

The first Sivas Folk Poets Festival was launched on November 5, 1931, and lasted for three days. In total, 15 minstrels and folk poets were found to attend, including Veysel; most were also instrumentalists. Veysel sang from the repertoire he had learned from Çamışıhlı Ali Ağa. The festival was ultimately successful; Although Veysel did not perform his own poetry at the time, his performance attracted the intellectuals of urban Sivas, who were allegedly unaware of such a rich folk tradition among the local peasantry. At the festival's conclusion, Veysel was offered 10 lira in payment. Veysel, however, rejected the money, despite being very poor. Veysel was recorded as saying: "You valued us and invited us here. We should really be giving it to you." He was finally compelled to take 5 lira.

Of his participation in the event, Veysel commented some years later:

O gece bizim resmimizi de çektilerdi. Ama kıyafetimiz böyle değildi. Elimde uzun bir değnek, başımda eski bir Sivas şapkası, sırtımda köyde dokunan kara koyun yününden şal bir ceket, yine kara koyun yününden dokunmuş bir şal zıvga, ayağımızda şaldan dolak ve bizim dikmiş olduğumuz çarık vardı. O zaman köyde şaldan başka giyecek elbise yoktu. Kumaş nerede idi. İşte ütüsüz bir elbise ile çıktım sahneye... Elimde ise Zara'nın Girit köyünde yapılan meşe ağacından oyma bir sazım vardı.

Ben sazımı çok severdim. Hem ilk sazım, hem de elime iyiydi. Çok ufak olmasına nazaran iyi ses verirdi. Ayrıca perdelerini ustam Ali Ağa düzenlemişti. Hatta İbrahim'le beraber Colombia Plak şirketine Köroğlu, Karacaoğlan, Hacıbey, Çiçekler, Keklik gibi türküleri o sazımla okudum.
They also took our picture that night. But we weren't dressed like this [as I am now]. I had a long stick in my hand; an old Sivas hat on my head; a black sheep's wool shawl jacket; woven in the village; on my back, a zıvga shawl made from black sheep's wool; we had shawls wrapped around our feet; and shoes we had sewn ourselves. At the time, there were no clothes to wear other than the shawls in the village. Where could we have gotten the fabric? That's why I went onstage with unironed clothes... in my hand was a saz carved from oak wood, made in Zara's Girit village. I loved my saz very much. It was my first saz and it fit my hand well. Despite being very small, it produced a good sound. Also, the frets were set by my master, Ali Ağa. In fact, together with İbrahim, I sang folk songs like Köroğlu, Karacaoğlan, Hacıbey, Çiçekler, Keklik to the Colombia Record Company with that saz.

— Âşık Veysel

=== Ankara ===
In 1933, the Republic of Turkey, which had replaced the old Ottoman Empire, was approaching its 10th anniversary. Tecer was by this time Director of Education for Sivas, a post he had been appointed to in 1932. In this capacity, Tecer began to encourage the ashiks of Sivas, including Veysel, to compose a poem reflecting on the nascent Republic and its President, Mustafa Kemal Atatürk.

Until this point, Veysel had never sung any of his own poetry. Although personal composition formed a core part of the ashik tradition, and despite having allegedly composed poetry before, Veysel never performed it, as he was worried that people would think he was in love with one of the local girls. Tecer's request, however, tempted him; Veysel was a staunch nationalist, as well as a lifelong admirer of Atatürk and his reforms. In response, Veysel revealed his first poem, "Atatürk is the Revival of Turkey" (Turkish: Atatürk’tür Türkiye’nin İhyası). For his effort, Tecer gave Veysel a certificate identifying him as a folk poet. This certificate allowed Veysel and other poets like him to move around the country without fear that their instruments would be taken away and destroyed.

Veysel's poem was very popular, and was forwarded to both Tecer and to Ankara by Ali Rıza Bey, then the Director of Ağacakışla township, with which Sivrialan was affiliated. However, no response was received from Ankara. Veysel therefore resolved to travel there on foot, alongside a friend, his cousin İbrahim Tutuş (nicknamed "Cort İbrahim"), with the hopes of personally presenting the epic to Atatürk. The journey was very difficult, having been undertaken in tough winter conditions, and took three months to complete. At one point, passing a herd of cattle between Kayseri and Kırşehir, Veysel and Ibrahim were set upon by dogs. Ibrahim reportedly hid behind Veysel, who had to look for stones to throw by dragging his foot over the ground. However, Veysel could not pick up a stone without exposing his head to the dogs. They were only rescued later by the arrival of the cowherd.

Once at Ankara, neither Veysel nor Ibrahim had the money to stay in a hotel. They were advised to stay with a Pasha from Erzurum, who was known for his hospitality, and they stayed with the Pasha for a few days in the neighborhood of Dağardı. Next, Veysel and Ibrahim stayed in the home of a local man, Hasan Efendi, who ran a business owning horse-drawn carriages. They resided at Hasan Efendi's house for 45 days. Eventually, Veysel, impatient, told Efendi that he and Ibrahim had come to Ankara to present Veysel's epic to Atatürk, and asked how it might be accomplished. Efendi was poor, and not very well-connected. He had heard of a member of parliament by the name of Mustafa Bey, but could not remember his surname. He advised Veysel to speak to the MP. The MP was resistant to the idea. Initially instructing Veysel and Ibrahim to go away, he heard Veysel perform, but was only willing to present Veysel's poem to a local newspaper, the Hakimiyet-i Milliye. He advised Veysel and Ibrahim to return the next day. However, they were later informed that nothing further could be done.

At a loss for what else to do, Veysel and Ibrahim decided to go to the printing press themselves. Veysel's saz needed to be restringed, so the pair proceeded to the bazaar in Ulus Square (then known as Karaoğlan Square) to buy strings. Their visit happened to coincide with an upcoming visit by the Shah of Iran. As such, security was very tight. Veysel and Ibrahim, being ignorant of urban affairs, dressed in shabby clothes, and (in Veysel's case) blind, were barred from entry by a local policeman. A second attempt to enter the bazaar was countered with threats. The policeman only ceded to the pair's defiance on the condition that Veysel, being blind, would let Ibrahim buy the strings in his stead, and they went to the printing press the next day. After hearing Veysel's poem, the reception of the press was much more encouraging, and despite Veysel's own doubts, his photograph and an article about his poem were duly published on April 3, 1934. The story was circulated for three days, bringing Veysel's name to public prominence across Ankara.

Despite this, no news was heard from Atatürk. Veysel and Ibrahim decided to return to Sivrialan. By this point, however, both were out of money. They contacted a lawyer for assistance, who sent a letter to the Ankara Municipality on Veysel and Ibrahim's behalf. Both the Municipality and the Government Office denied them any money, informing the pair that they should return to Sivrialan by the same way in which they had come. Deciding to see if they could earn any money at the Ankara Community Center, Veysel and Ibrahim proceeded there, but were again denied entry. Thankfully, a passerby recognized Veysel from his photograph, and helped to obtain their entry. The community center deputies bought both Veysel and Ibrahim a pair of suits, and they gave a concert on Sunday of that week, for which they were given money. Veysel and Ibrahim used this money to return to Sivrialan.

=== Stardom ===
Having been denied a meeting with Atatürk in Ankara, Veysel played saz in other cities and villages to earn a living, also attending minstrel meetings in Çorum, Tokat, Yozgat, Kayseri, Konya, Mersin, Adana, and Istanbul. In İzmir, Veysel—once again with İbrahim as a travelling companion—was advised by a listener to meet with Mesut Cemil, the manager of a radio station located near the Tokatlıyan Hotel in Istanbul, where Veysel would be able to go on air. Veysel hoped this would be a second opportunity to possibly meet Atatürk. Bearing a letter of introduction from İzmir, Veysel went to Istanbul with İbrahim and performed for Cemil, who was so deeply touched by Veysel's playing that it, reportedly, moved him to tears. Cemil agreed to feature Veysel in that evening's 8 o' clock broadcast. He made his first radio appearance, alongside İbrahim, on April 15, 1936. Though Veysel sung at the top of his lungs—having never interacted with a radio before, he had mistakenly assumed that he would need to shout to be heard—the performance was extremely well received, and Cemil's office was inundated with cards and flowers. Veysel and Ibrahim were put up that evening in the house of a local man.

Unbeknownst to Veysel at the time, his radio appearance had in fact been attended by Atatürk himself. Atatürk was so impressed that he telephoned the radio station from Dolmabahçe, requesting to see Veysel. However, Cemil did not know where Veysel was staying. The local police were dispatched to search for Veysel and İbrahim, but neither could be found, despite continuing the search throughout the night. Veysel and İbrahim were only informed of Atatürk's phone call when they returned to Cemil's office the next day. Still hopeful that a meeting could be arranged, Cemil wrote them a letter of introduction to an official at Dolmabahçe, Yaver Şükrü, and Veysel and İbrahim proceeded there immediately with the letter in hand. Şükrü, however informed them that they were most likely too late. Indeed, an audience could not be arranged with Atatürk. This second misfortune touched Veysel deeply. He remembered it for the rest of his life, and would recount the incident to his children every Republic Day on October 29, even long after Atatürk predeceased him in 1938.

Veysel and İbrahim continued to make records an appear on the radio together for four years. They were invited to appear on air again in 1936 by Columbia Plak Finna, where they made a joint recording of the folk song "Mecnun'um Leyla'mı Gördüm" (I'm Mecnun, I saw my Leyla). Both Veysel and Ibrahim also were cited as sources for a number of folk songs recorded in a compilatory book published in 1938.

In 1940, Veysel and İbrahim travelled to Tarsus. At the Şadırvanlı Inn, where Veysel and İbrahim shared a room, Veysel went out one morning to find that his money, which he kept in a wallet in his jacket pocket, had been stolen. The door to Veysel's room had been locked, and only three people had access. Veysel quickly suspected Ibrahim. He composed and performed a poem about the incident, entitled "Locked Door, Empty Wallet in Pocket" (Kapı Kitli Cüzdan Cepte Para Yok), describing the crime, his feelings regarding it, and his message to the thief (ironically, this included the invective that the thief should, like Veysel had, become blind in both eyes). Although this poem never explicitly incriminated Ibrahim, and although the evidence was entirely circumstantial—especially given Ibrahim's previously stellar track record with Veysel—the two soon parted ways. Nothing is known of what became of Ibrahim afterwards. Many years passed before Veysel later discovered, by sheer coincidence, that the real culprit had been the hotel manager's young son, who confessed to the crime as an adult, while Veysel was staying at his house. By this time, Veysel no longer bore any anger towards the thief, but, there was no known reconciliation with Ibrahim.

From 1940 onwards, Veysel began to travel with a second companion, Veysel Erkılıç (b. 1913), also a minstrel, with whom he would sometimes perform. Because they shared the same name, Erkılıç quickly gained the nickname 'Little Veysel' (Turkish: Küçük Veysel). Erkılıç remained with Âşık Veysel until the former's death of a heart attack in 1960.

== Saz instructor: 1941–1946 ==
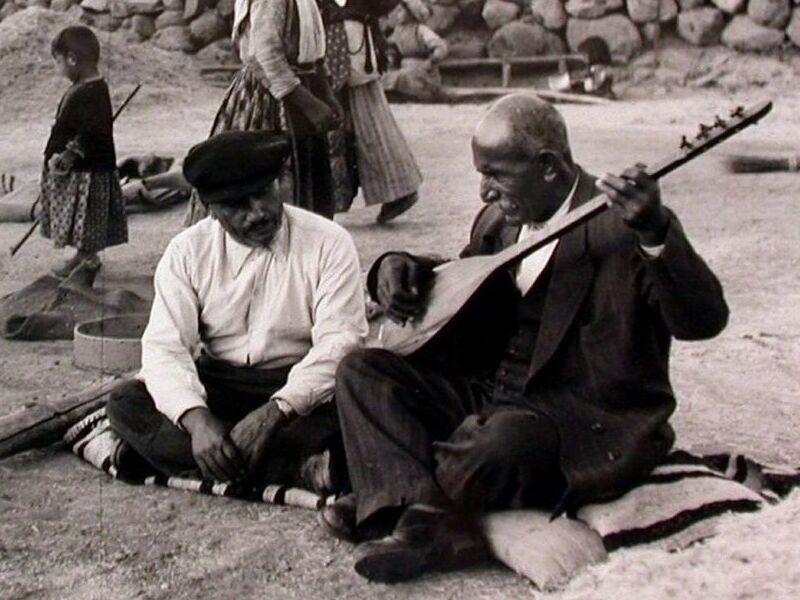
Veysel playing his bağlama in 1943

=== Village institutes ===
By 1945, Ahmet Kutsi Tecer had begun to implement music programs at local Village Institutes, aiming to provide an education to children of the local peasantry—then numbering approximately 12 million people—with no access to primary schools. With the initiatives of Sabahattin Eyüboğlu, Bedri Rahmi Eyüboğlu, İsmail Hakkı Tonguç, and Bedrettin Tuncel, Tecer appointed Veysel as a saz instructor at the Arifiye Village Institute in 1941. Veysel also taught saz at the village institutes of Hasanoğlan (1942), Eskişehir Çifteler (1943), Kastamonu Gülköy (1944), Yıldızeli Pamukpınar (1945), and Samsun Ladik Akpınar (1946). In addition to teaching, he also gave concerts at the village institutes of Savaştepe, Pulur, Akçadağ, Kepirtepe, and Düziçi, as well as at local community centers.

Veysel, himself deprived of his own education, was a staunch supporter of the village institute system. The position also gave him opportunities to befriend prominent intellectuals such as Sabahattin Eyuboğlu, Ruhi Su, and Yaşar Kemal. Both Kemal and Su believed that Veysel wrote his most beautiful poems during this period. One of his most famous compositions, "Black Earth" (Turkish: Kara Toprak) was written at Çifteler. Indeed, Veysel found such joy in teaching saz at the institutes that Kemal, who heard his singing at Hasanoğlan in 1942, asked if Karacaoğlan would have sung as happily; initially pretending not to understand Kemal, Veysel eventually laughed and replied simply that Karacaoğlan would have found it impossible: "He didn't have Hasanoğlan!"

As Veysel spent more time at the institutes, however, he began to grow bored. At Ladik, he wrote a new poem, "Letter" (Turkish: Mektup), framing it as a letter from his wife Gülizar, asking him to come home to Sivrialan. In a later conversation with TRT correspondent and friend Erdogan Alkan, Veysel explained that whilst he championed the institutes' initiative, he had always disliked towns and unfamiliar places, because his blindness made them restricting; Veysel found the environment too loud, and did not like that he was unable to go outside on his own (Veysel spent much of this period being guided by his eldest son, Ahmet). In contrast, Veysel knew Sivrialan well enough that he could walk around independently and enter any house he wanted. Whilst at the Village Institute at Ladik in 1946, Veysel was given 15 days leave to return to his village. He did not return to the institutes again.

=== Publication and censorship ===
Veysel was also heavily involved in Community Centers (Halkevleri) during this period. From 1932, these centers, which aimed to consolidate and reexamine the full corpus of Turkish culture, history, language, and economy, dealt extensively with research into Turkish folk music and literature. Many prominent folk poets, including Veysel, were featured in their publications. Veysel's first book, a poetry anthology entitled Sayings (Turkish: Deyişler), was prepared by Tecer and published by the Community Center Headquarters in 1944, and many of his most well-known poems were also released in the magazine Ülkü, including Black Earth (Kara Toprak); If You Are a Gazelle, I am a Hunter (Sen Bir Ceylan Olsan Ben de Bir Avcı); If I Pour My Troubles into the Deep Stream (Derdimi Dökersem Derin Dereye); Letter (Mektup), and others.

Whilst Veysel initially approved of the Community Centers' work, by the 1950s, it was no longer safe to make social or political criticisms in Turkey. Many of Veysel's poems were censored without his knowledge. One of Veysel's social critiques, Address to God (Tanrı'ya Hitap), opening with the line "Memleketi gören sensin" (You are the one who sees this country), was changed to "you are the one who sees this world", without Veysel's prior approval. From May 14 of that year, Veysel's work was no longer published by Ülkü magazine. Veysel himself also heavily disapproved of any form of censorship. He appeared in a 1953 dramatization of his own life, The Dark World (Karanlık Dünya), directed by Metin Erksan, shot in and around Sivrialan and rural Sivas. The film's screening permit was withheld for unfavourably depicting the conditions of Turkish peasant life, especially after the reforms of the Democrat Party, and Erksan was forced to reshoot these scenes in another town. The film's ending was rewritten to show Veysel returning to Sivrialan with his guide, Erkılıç, after a long time away, only to discover with astonishment that the village had been modernized, and now made use of combine harvesters and tractors. In protest, Veysel did not attend the film's premiere. According to his son, Ahmet, Veysel later recalled the film with amusement; he did not think anyone would seriously believe that the film depicted the real Sivrialan, nor did he believe that censoring the village had contributed anything towards improving it.

In 1957, Veysel was visited in Sivrialan by the French writer Alain Gheerbrant, who made several field recordings of Veysel playing the saz. The recordings are noted for showcasing Veysel playing in a manner more akin to the Alevi style. Veysel Erkılıç is also heard accompanying him on several tracks. The recordings, including Veysel's famous Kara Toprak, and an extensive improvised prelude on the saz, were compiled in Gheerbrant's album Voyages D'Alain Gheerbrant En Anatolie (1956-1957). Gheerbrant's work now constitutes some of the highest-quality recordings of Veysel available.

== Later years: 1946–1970 ==
Having left the Village Institute at Ladik in 1946, Veysel decided to establish an apple orchard in Sivrialan. This idea was met with scorn from his fellow villagers (who frequently underestimated Veysel because he was blind). Veysel, however, carried out the work anyway with the help of his brother Ali, in 1949. The plan was successful. Veysel's initiative went on to be copied across Şarkışla, and apples from his orchard were sold as "Aşık Veysel's apples".

=== Commemoration ===
In 1952, a jubilee was held for Veysel in Istanbul under the leadership of İhsan Hınçer, of the Turkish folklore Research Journal, and with the support of a range of institutions and organizations. Notables in the folklore scene, including Tecer, gave speeches on various aspects of Veysel and his work, and presented some of his poems. A similar jubilee was also held in Ankara in the same year.

Veysel's name was also passed on to ophthalmologists in Istanbul. Having been blind for 51 years, Veysel was approached once again with the offer of cataract surgery. However, Veysel now declined the offer. When asked why, he stated that he had built his own world in his head, and feared that being able to see again would destroy his inner world. Veysel later wrote a poem, Bir Küçük Dünyam var Içimde Benim (I Have a Little World Inside Me), explaining that his own patriotism, determination, and inner world were enough for him, with the only regret being that his blindness had prevented him from joining the military 38 years before.

Âşıklara hu geldi
Harkı açın su geldi
Ellere düğün bayram
Bize haktan bu geldi.

Joy as come to the ashiks,
Open the channel, the water has come
For others a wedding feast
For us, this came from God

— Lament for Veysel Erkılıç, 1960

On November 4, 1960, Veysel's regular travelling companion, Veysel Erkılıç ("Little Veysel"), died of a sudden heart attack. Erkılıç had by then been Veysel's guide for just over 20 years. Âşık Veysel, who had been attending a wedding at the time the death was announced, was heard to say in grief, "Now I'm blind". Veysel proceeded at once to Erkılıç's home. He hugged Erkılıç's sister, composed an elegiac quatrain on the spot, then broke down and "sobbed like a child".

Despite the loss, Veysel's family agreed that Veysel should continue travelling, but should on no account travel alone. Thenceforth, Veysel's last travelling companion became his oldest son, Ahmet Şatıroğlu. Ahmet travelled with his father to Çankaya in 1965 to meet the President of Turkey, Cemal Gürsel, where Veysel read him poems on solidarity and unity. Gürsel not only attended a jubilee held for Veysel, held in Kızılay in April of that year, but also awarded him a lifetime pension "for his services to our mother tongue and national unity, from the national service scheme for as long as he lives". This pension awarded him a salary of 500 lira a month. This was the first time such an award had been granted to any Turkish citizen.

From the 28th to 30 October 1967, the Second Sivas Folk Poets Festival was held in Konya. Veysel attended, at the age of 73, this time as its oldest and most highly regarded participant, in the capacity of a member of the jury.

== Final years: 1970–1973 ==
Veysel struggled with ill health towards the last 10 years of his life, and came to Istanbul with Ahmet in 1961, for medical attention. According to his biographer Ahmet Özdemir, Veysel was now visibly old and exhausted. He made fewer appearances, though he continued to give informal, short performances, and appeared as a guest of honour at a minstrels' festival in Istanbul in July 1971. He gave his last concert in Hacıbektaş on 15 August 1971. The audience called for Kara Toprak ("Black Earth"). According to Ahmet, Veysel replied, "Dear audience, I already have a handful of earth. It will cover me, what can I give you?" Veysel began to recite "Kara Toprak", but was unable to complete the song. He exited the stage early and fell ill the next morning. In late 1971, Veysel began to receive treatment at the Sivas Numune hospital. Reportedly, when a doctor asked for permission to examine Veysel's heart, Veysel had replied, "Examine me from head to toe, but leave my heart to me. There are secret things there that belong to me. [I said] you will see them."

By 1972, Veysel's health had begun to rapidly worsen. He spent time in various hospitals, where he was eventually diagnosed with lung cancer. In the same year, Veysel was approached by an official delegation from Sivas, headed by former senator Hüseyin Öztürk, with the proposal to establish an association in his name. Veysel was allegedly not very warm to the idea. He only agreed on the condition that the association would be strictly non-political, would establish scholarships for poor students, and establish educational institutions in his name.

=== Death ===
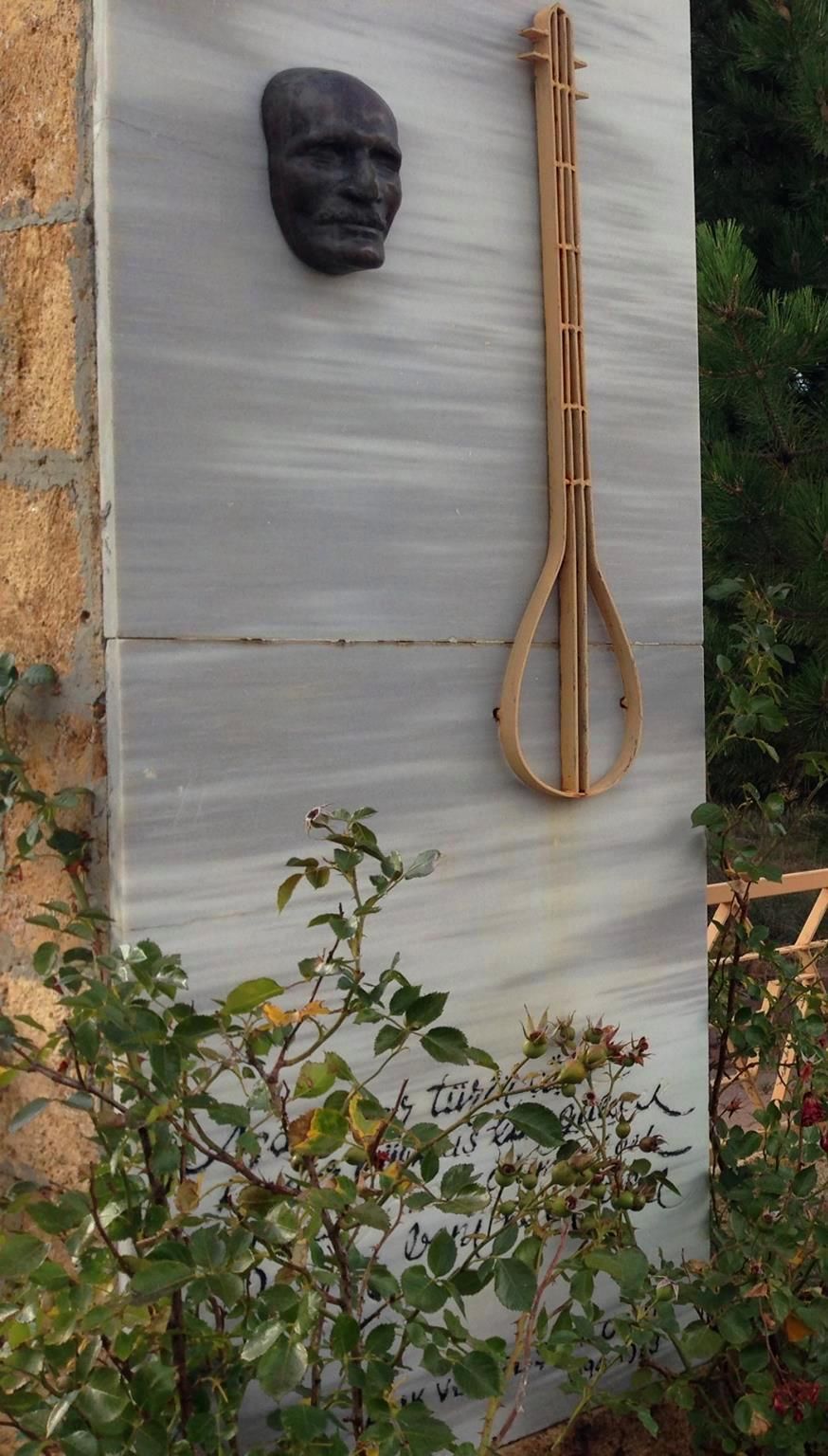
Grave of Aşık Veysel near Sivrialan, showing his saz and death mask

By January 1973, Veysel realized that he was dying. He refused to stay in hospital, opting instead to return to Sivrialan to die. News that Veysel was in his final days soon spread through the country, and Veysel was frequently visited by friends and family, as well as fans. He was also visited by Celal Kayakan, then the Governor of Sivas, who asked if Veysel had any last wishes; Veysel requested that a bridge be built over the Kızılırmak River, located not far from Sivrialan, whose frequent flooding and rapid waters had long posed a significant danger to the local community. Shortly before he died, Veysel also requested that he be buried in the field where his mother had given birth to him, on open ground, so that the land could continue to be used for agriculture and for the environment.

He died in his sleep at 3:30 am on March 21, 1973. According to Veysel's wishes, his body was kept at home for a day, before being buried in Ayipınarı, where he was born. Veysel's funeral, held on March 22, was attended by thousands. The funeral procession was led by Veysel's grandson, bearing his grandfather's saz, and Veysel's voice, reciting his poem Let My Friends Remember Me (Dostlar Beni Hatırlasın) was played from a tape recorder carried by his youngest son Bahri.

=== Aftermath and legacy ===
Within a day of Veysel's death, a death mask of his face was made, with the permission of Veysel's family, by Ahmet Özdemir and two colleagues, who hoped to buy the mask and use it to make commemorative statues of Veysel. Özdemir, who had not performed the procedure before, had difficulty removing the mask, and Veysel's eyebrows, lashes, and moustache got stuck to the plaster. Veysel's son, Bahri Şatıroğlu, exclaimed in distress: "Poor father. Even in death, they still torment you."

News of Veysel's death quickly spread across the country. The Turkish newspaper Hürriyet raised 335,000 lira for Veysel, of which 200,000 were used to build a statue of him, with the remaining money going to the Sivrialan school. In 1982, based on an initiative by the Ministry of Culture, Veysel's house in Sivrialan was opened to the public as a museum.

In 1990, the Cabinet of Turkey granted Veysel's wife, Gülizar, a pension based on national service.

In 2000, a compilation album of Âşık Veysel's songs named Âşık Veysel Klasikleri was released. In 2008, Joe Satriani's album Professor Satchafunkilus and the Musterion of Rock featured two songs called Âşık Veysel and Andalusia, which were dedicated to Âşık Veysel. In the same year, a remixed version of Âşık Veysel's song Uzun İnce Bir Yoldayım was featured as the main theme in a Turkish film series, Gece Gündüz.

== Style ==
=== Instrumentation ===
Veysel played both the cura and the bağlama saz, two sizes of the same instrument; he generally played the larger, long-necked bağlama saz, made of mulberry wood, and played wıth a cherry wood plectrum (which he carved himself). He owned multiple sazı throughout his life. Veysel's very first saz was old and cracked; Ahmet Kutsı Tecer allegedly stated that as a young man, Veysel lost seven instruments when the gendarmerie confiscated and incinerated them; he then lost another when it was broken in a bus accident. Upon his death, Veysel was buried with a saz. One surviving saz came into the possession of Veysel's nephew, who, who later gifted it to a saz maker, Şentürk İyidoğan, in nearby Zara, where Veysel had purchased his first saz in 1928.

All of Veysel's songs are Türküler, namely folk songs of Turkish origin, with most of them being deyiş type songs. Veysel's works generally consist of uzun havalar and kırık havalar (consistently rhythmic and irregularly rhythmic/non-rhythmic songs). His melodies featured a restricted range composed in a variety of Turkish makams, including Hüseyni, Uşşak, Hijaz, Rast, Muhayyer, and Karçığar, and used 2/4, 4/4, 5/8, and 7/8 time signatures. Most of his works prominently feature the descending melodic progression found in Turkish makam music. Refrains were ubiquitous in Veysel's poetry, musically characterized by repeating leitmotifs. He played in the Alevi style and used the aşık düzeni ('aşık pattern', sometimes known as 'Veysel pattern'), characterized by less extensive movement across the saz's fingerboard.

=== Poetry ===
Veysel's poetic style typified the traditional structures and techniques found in Anatolian folk poetry. Lyrics in his poems are defined by simple, but powerful Turkish, with stanzas typically arranged into quatrains featuring simple rhyme schemes (typically ABAB, mâni AABA, or monorhymes); to achieve this, Veysel heavily utilized the agglutinative structure of Turkish, for instance by pairing the same verb conjugations to form couplets. He also relied on broadly repeated refrains interspersed throughout most of his poems. Also typical of Turkish folk poetry, Veysel's poems used syllabic verse over prosodic metre, with each line sharing the same number of syllables, typically 11 per line, though the number could go up to 13 (e.g. Kara Toprak). As with most folk poems, Veysel tended to finished his poems by adding his name, or a close pseudonym, into his final stanzas.

In terms of subject matter, most of Veysel's poems were about nature, love, solidarity, national pride, or life and death, and were informed by Veysel's perception of the world as a blind man. Few of his poems were explicitly political. Despite being a practicing Alevi Muslim, only some of Veysel's poems were explicitly religious in nature, though he frequently alluded to religion in many of his works; once asked why he did not mention Alevism or Bektashism (it was impossible to tell which Veysel was from his poems alone), Veysel replied, "If you listen to my songs with your heart's eye, you will understand what I am talking about. If you don't have eyes to see, what shall I do?" In the aşık tradition, a large number of Veysel's poems were taken from popular folk legends, with the stories used as a vehicle for Veysel to discuss his own thoughts, feelings, and perceptions (e.g. 'Mecnunum Leylamı Gördüm'; I'm Mecnun, I Saw My Layla').

== Views ==
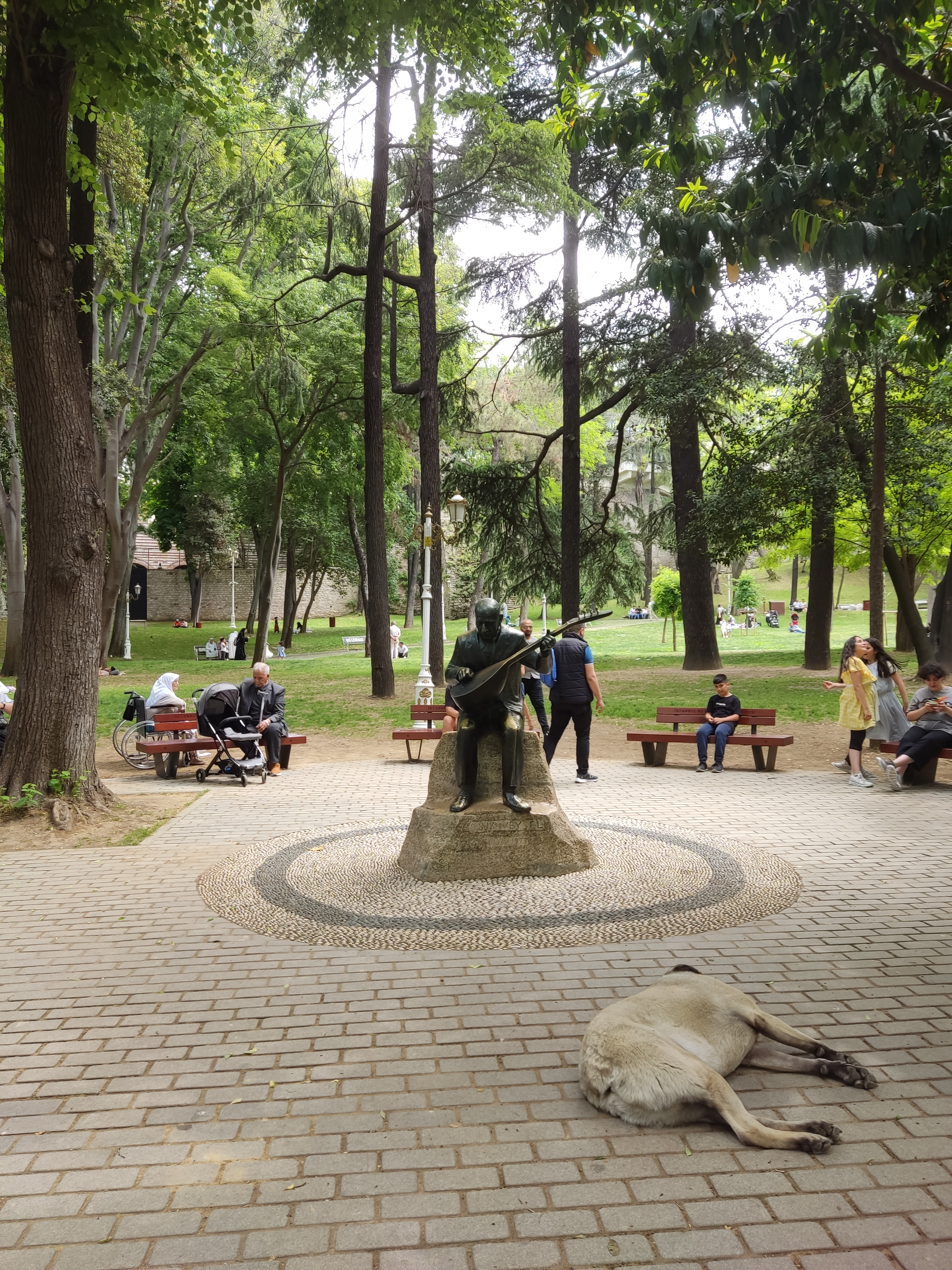
His statue at Gülhane Park

=== Environmentalism ===
Veysel was a lifelong environmentalist and agrarian. These aspects form one of the most notable themes in his work and interviews, and one of Veysel's most famous poems, Black Earth (Kara Toprak), is exemplary for its reflection of Veysel's love of the natural environment. Most of his other poems had the beauty of nature as a central theme, with many of them dedicated to the landscape around Veysel's native Sivas and Sivrialan. Another expression of this is found in the apple orchard Veysel established in Sivrialan in 1949. He spent most of his childhood and almost all of his adult life entrusted with the care of the family garden, being unable to carry out farming activities due to his blindness, and found solace there when he was left behind at the outbreak of the First World War and War of Independence. When asked what he liked to do when at home, Veysel's first response was that he spent time in his garden or orchard. His wife Gulizar also noted that Veysel "liked to find red and green with his hands". Veysel's garden, located in the new house he had built in Sivrialan, was frequently remarked upon by visitors as being of exceptional beauty, and Veysel passed most of his time cultivating it, giving away much of its produce to his fellow villagers for free. One of his last wishes was to be buried in the pasture where he was born, without a headstone, so that his gravesite could be left open for grazing.

Although he was a strong environmentalist throughout his life, Veysel also actively encouraged industrialisation and technological development. Born a child of the late 19th century, raised in poverty in a remote Anatolian village, and denied a formal education due to his own blindness, Veysel lived through a period of immense political change in Turkey, experiencing rapid technological advancement and total social and political upheaval. The hardships of his own life and his patriotism for his country meant that Veysel welcomed any change that he thought was beneficial to social development. He was, however, not strictly a romantic, as there is no evidence that he believed technology and the environment were inherently opposed. Rather, Veysel frequently used his poetry to call his audience—many of whom were poor villagers benefiting from the first public education programs in Turkey—to use their education to pursue science and innovation. He himself made frequent use of many technologies that were almost entirely new to him, most commonly the radio. He also kept a radio at home, of which he was reportedly very fond. Veysel was also enthusiastic about photographs and film, despite being blind, believing that it was important that people knew not only what he sounded like, but also what he looked like. He preferred his photos to show him smiling. Finally, Veysel had an intense curiosity for most technologies, almost all of which he had never seen before going blind; he was once observed enthusiastically examining a car with his hands, laughing to himself. One of the most financially well-off in his home village of Sivrialan, it was Veysel who paid to bring electricity to Sivrialan, making it the first village in the local area to have access to electricity.

=== Humanism ===
In the highly religiously charged environment of 20th century Turkey, Veysel remained a strong humanist throughout his life. He continually championed cooperation and unity across all nationalities, social classes, and sects. He was, however, not a strict pacifist. He openly and frequently expressed his desire to fight for Turkey in the First World War and War of Independence, sentiments which were reflected in his poems.

=== Politics ===
Veysel was a staunch nationalist throughout his life, as well as an ardent supporter of Mustafa Kemal Atatürk. Veysel had grown up in a largely underdeveloped region, in abject poverty, blind and uneducated, reaching his majority with the end of the Ottoman Empire. A firm patriot, Veysel's greatest wish as a young man was to fight for his nation in the First World War and the War of Independence. He welcomed most of Atatürk's reforms with open arms. Mindful of his own illiteracy, of which he expressed some bitterness, Veysel was particularly approving of the increased education opportunities which Atatürk brought to Turkey's most impoverished regions. Veysel kept a large portrait of Atatürk in his home in Sivrialan.

Despite his strongly nationalistic views, most of Veysel's poetry continued to focus on nature and pastoralism as core themes, a decision for which he was occasionally criticized; his poems for Atatürk, despite constituting some of his best known work, were exceptional in their focus, rather than the norm. Following the 1961 constitution, when many minstrels transitioned to performing leftist political poems, Veysel continued in his non-political poetry. When asked why by a friend, Veysel replied, "I'm blind, if I veer left and right and don't walk straight, I will fall into a pit."

=== Music ===
The saz and folk music naturally formed a central part of Veysel's life. Born into an Alevi village, Veysel grew up in a community who expressed spiritual connection through music, particularly through the saz, and Veysel also nursed a love for his art and his instrument throughout his life. When his saz was broken in a bus accident on the way to a concert, Veysel famously wrote a poem for his instrument with the lines: If I go, my instrument, you stay in this world/ Don't divulge my hidden secrets/ As I remember my father, you remember your master. Even when a new saz was immediately made for him, when asked how he was finding the new saz after a year with it, Veysel still mourned his old instrument, stating "I have got used to it, but it hasn't gotten used to me." In another poem, Veysel said of his instrument: You [my saz] are like a flower, Veysel is a bee/ We would get down and make honey together. He famously wore it slung over his shoulder like a rifle, homage to the fact that he had not been able to fight in World War I or the War of Independence. According to his daughter, Veysel would also stay awake into the early hours of the morning, sitting in the dark, and play saz all night while he hummed to himself; his daughter thought he was ill, though in reality, Veysel was just composing poetry. By his own admission, he would do this until he lost his voice, as it made him forget about his own blindness, and allowed him to put his troubles aside. Days before his death in March 1973, Veysel asked for his saz and kissed it goodbye. He was buried with the instrument, though he in fact owned several of them, one of which was donated to a museum by his son Bahri.

As one of the most well-respected musicians in Turkey, Veysel was frequently asked for his opinions of folk music and other artists. A non-confrontational man by nature, he was hesitant to name anyone whose work he actively disliked, stating, "I cannot say Ibrahim is good whilst Mehmet is bad." He did, however, hold some in particularly high esteem, especially Hidir Dede, a Sivrialan-born saz player with whom Veysel was a contemporary, and to whom Veysel attributed much of his own skill. By contrast, he was more critical of Western music, especially adaptations of his own work into the Western tradition. He expressed a quiet, albeit clear, disapproval of cover versions of his songs scored to European orchestras and traditionally European instruments. He was, however, apparently tolerant in his opinion; Veysel was a longtime friend of the multi-instrumentalist and rock musician Fikret Kızılok, who had visited Sivrialan to ask for Veysel's blessing to cover his song Uzun İnce Bir Yoldayım. Veysel apparently granted it, because Kızılok released a version in 1969, played in psychedelic rock style to a guitar. Veysel also gave Kızılok saz lessons.

Veysel similarly was not keen on translations of his poems (at the time, primarily into European languages), implying that he felt they separated his work from its connection to Turkey and its people, and that his poems ought to be read only in Turkish, stating: "Must they be changed?". Veysel's opinion that folk music was intrinsically and inseparably connected to the land even extended into Turkish music played on Turkish instruments, by Turkish musicians; once asked to listen to another musician play a folk song on the saz, Veysel commented that whilst the song was still beautiful, it had been removed from its homeland in the country, and therefore had undergone an inherent change of which he did not implicitly approve.

=== Life and death ===
Veysel's attitude towards death was relatively light. He was quoted as saying, "Why should I be afraid of death? Death is my friend." However, although he frequently reflected on the subject in his work, and although a large portion of his works were pessimistic, Veysel did not reflect this in his day-to-day life. He was often asked about his health, to which he was known to reply, as if he had misunderstood, "I don't have a watch." His friend, Erdoğan Alkan, once asked him where he wanted to be buried, to which Veysel replied, "I'm not dead yet. I'll think about it when I die!" Veysel was asked the same question again, also on his deathbed, and ended up caught in an argument with his younger son, Bahri, who insisted that Veysel should choose to be buried nearer the village, instead of in the pasture where he had been born. Veysel ended the argument, stating, "Don't talk nonsense. Am I going to be buried or you?" He was eventually interred in the Ayipınarı pasture. His children were later buried there as well; Veysel's son Bahri joined him there in September 2021.

== Personal life ==
=== Family ===
Through his marriage to Esma, Veysel had two children, a son and a daughter; Veysel's son, Ali, died ten days after birth, and his daughter, Elif, died aged two. The marriage lasted for 8 years. Through his second wife, Gülizar, Veysel had seven children, three sons and four daughters; Zöhre Beşer, Ahmet, Hüseyin, Menekşe Süzer, Bahri, Zekine, and Hayriye Özer. Their son, Hüseyin, died in childhood; his birth and death dates are not known. Gülizar and Veysel were happily married until Veysel's death in 1973. Gülizar died on 29 October 1991, at the age of 105. She and Veysel are survived by 22 grandchildren.

Through his brother, Ali, Veysel had three nieces and one nephew.

=== Blindness ===
Veysel was born with black eyes, which he described as being "beautiful as black grapes". Descriptions of the medical particulars of Veysel's blindness are scant. His own description of how he lost his eyesight ("leaking" in his left eye; gradual, late-onset blindness in the right, caused by the strain of the left) suggests that his blindness was a combination of corneal ulcer and sympathetic ophthalmia. Veysel kept his eyes closed at all times, even when walking.

His condition presented him with unique difficulties throughout his life. Veysel was ostracized as a child due to his blindness, and never attended school. As a young man, he frequently seemed bitter about his condition; in addition to being left out of fighting in the 1910s, anecdotal evidence suggests that Veysel was often given to suspicion and jealousy. His first wife, Esma, alleged that Veysel was jealous of her, because Esma had been described to him as very beautiful, and yet Veysel could not see her; this is corroborated by their acquaintance, Veysel Kaymak. The 25 year-old Veysel would allegedly conduct bizarre experiments to test Esma's loyalty, or make baseless accusations against her; she also described him as "very grumpy". In 1940, when Veysel was 46, his money was stolen in a hotel in Tarsus—Veysel suspected his roommate, his cousin İbrahim, despite having no evidence. They fell out and never travelled together again. Once asked what his greatest wish was, Veysel responded that he wished to meet President Atatürk; he expressed bitterness that Atatürk's photograph, which was widely available, was inaccessible to him, and that he wanted to hear the president's voice. Atatürk died before Veysel could ever meet him, for which the latter expressed lifelong regret. The depression Veysel felt at his blindness was also expressed in several of his poems.

Having never learned to read or write, Veysel composed all of his poetry in his head. Once composed, he would have someone write his poems down. Veysel's descriptions of colours and physical form were mostly not drawn from his own experiences, as he had gone blind early enough that his visual memory was unreliable. In a 1969 interview with Erdoğan Alkan, Veysel stated that he only remembered the colours red and black. He remembered black from coal, and red from the hand he had bloodied after having fallen in the mud, just before going blind. He also recalled red from a newspaper or birth certificate he had once seen his father holding. However, Veysel still had isolated memories from before the age of 7; for instance, he could remember the location of a random boulder at the end of the road in the village.

Practically, Veysel was only able to move truly independently in his home village of Sivrialan. He relied on a number of travel companions throughout his life, first his cousin İbrahim, then his friend Veysel Erkilic, and finally his son Ahmet. Veysel would typically get around by holding onto a guide's arm. Independently, Veysel walked with a cane, usually a regular walking stick. He is shown holding a slim staff more akin to a modern white cane in a photograph from the First Sivas Poets' Festival in 1931, and Veysel was photographed using a regular long cane; he used a normal walking stick in a similar manner in archival footage. However, textual evidence suggests that it was unusual for Veysel to rely on mobility aids. Once in Istanbul, hearing that Atatürk was to give a speech on the radio, Veysel took to the streets on his own to try and find a radio broadcasting the speech. He "walked about, bumping into things, bumping into things", but ended up totally lost. He later discovered that he had not only missed the speech, but had wandered all the way out of the city and into the countryside.

Over the years, Veysel's other senses compensated for his blindness, a common experience for the blind. Veysel was able to differentiate people by their breath, footsteps, and smell, even from far away, and could call each individual by name. He liked to feel the faces of unfamiliar people, and could differentiate hundreds of individuals by voice. At home, Veysel was able to tell the time with a margin of error of about 30 minutes or less, presumably by listening to the ticking of the clock he kept on the wall (he also kept a pocket watch, though it is uncertain how he used it). He was able to cross the village without ever getting his shoes muddy. His wife Esma stated that Veysel could pull a snake out of a hole using nothing but sound. He once teased a friend whose car had broken down with a scathing poem, in which Veysel pointed out that the friend was tall. The latter was surprised and asked how Veysel could have known this, to which the poet replied simply: "When you talk, your voice comes from above."

He had an extraordinary working memory and memorized all his poems, including the voices of all his students at the Village Institutes (he knew which students were absent, where each was sitting, and whose technique required correction, even if the student had not spoken). Veysel's senses were so accurate that his friends and family were sometimes shocked. He once commissioned new clothes from a tailor, and, testing the stitching on the collar, wanted to know why the tailor's stitching was crooked. The tailor was confused until Veysel had him lay hands on the imperfection, which was so subtle that it was invisible to the eye. Commissioning a new house from a mason, he was able to find a loose brick by touch alone. He was also able to tell, by sound, whether or not someone was in his garden; not simply who the individual was, but also what had been taken, in what quantity, and even whether the produce was ripe or not. In this way, he was able to avoid people taking advantage of his blindness; a boy in the village, deciding to test Veysel, once laid down in front of his donkey just as Veysel was coming down the road. Veysel not only asked him to get out of the way thrice, but was able to reprimand the boy by name. His own children were unable to sneak past him without being identified.

=== Relationships ===
==== With Esma ====
The nature of the relationship between Veysel and his first wife is controversial. However, most accounts agree that there was definite animosity between Veysel and Esma, even while they were still married. The final straw was the relationship between Esma and her second husband. Schoolteacher Veysel Kaymak, who lived in Sivrialan from 1967 to 1977, was acquainted with both parties, and heard an account of Esma's marriage with Veysel from her perspective. Kaymak reports that Veysel was allegedly jealous, mostly because he was physically unable to see his wife. Veysel would reportedly test Esma's loyalty by hiding an apple under her pillow, then when the time came, ask Esma who had put it there. He would secretly throw stones into the chimney in order to judge what Esma's reaction would be. In an interview with Veysel's friend Erdoğan Alkan, Esma alleged that Veysel used to beat her. Researcher Gülağ Öz, who also lived in Sivrialan, recorded similar sentiments in an interview with Esma, who stated: "Veysel was very grumpy. He wouldn't give me a living and was always jealous. I didn't marry with my heart anyway." According to Esma, Veysel's mood alienated her from him, and she would seek out their neighbour, Hüseyin, for consolation. Veysel sensed what was happening, even suspecting that Esma would run away, and apparently warned her against Hüseyin on multiple occasions, though Esma admitted that "I told him [Veysel] how could he think of such a thing." Esma, ultimately, did elope with Hüseyin.

Veysel also suggested some longstanding animosity towards Esma, though he was either evasive of questions, or was more implicit. In 1967, interviewer İbrahim Aslanoğlu asked Veysel if he was married. Of his response, Aslanoğlu noted: "He [Veysel] speaks gently and with a full voice. He pretends not to understand the question he does not want to answer. He brushes it off with 'I don't know, I don't know, I didn't hear'. It seems that he does not want to delve into the issue of marriage today." Bekki (2021) notes that Veysel never spoke much about his marriages in general. The only exception was in an interview with folklorist Ahmet Günbulut. In this interview, Veysel admitted to sensing the affair. Veysel recounted that at the time, the housework was Esma and Hüseyin's job, whilst Veysel himself was in charge of the garden and hay threshing; Esma and Hüseyin's relationship meant that all the housework fell apart. In Veysel's words, "I had an old pistol from my father. I got it ready. I though I should finish them off. Now the winter preparations are over, the cold has started. But I couldn't manage to settle the matter." Veysel referred to his first marriage again, more implicitly, in one poem, writing "the cruel infidel made my lamb an orphan." Whilst the "infidel" is not named, Bekki (2021) interpreted this to refer to Esma. However, Veysel also wrote other poems in which he described his marriage to Esma in positive terms. Veysel wrote that whilst he loved Esma, Esma did not love him back, and she conversely thought he was "crazy". Incidentally, this is where Esma and Veysel's accounts both agree; Esma characterized Veysel in exactly this way in a later interview.

Following their separation, tension between Esma and Veysel cooled, though their remained some mixed feelings. On one hand, Veysel reportedly would pass by Esma's house on multiple occasions, in the hope of meeting her. According to Veysel's daughter Hayrire Özer, Veysel's only question, when Esma returned to Sivrialan with her new husband, was if Esma needed anything, and he allegedly would continue to ask. Özer also related a time when Esma had had a headache, and knocked on the door to Veysel's house, asking if Hayrire would ask Veysel for some medicine. On hearing this, Veysel reached into his pocket and placed an aspirin in Hayrire's palm, saying only that Esma's pain would grow worse.

Conversely, Esma stated that Veysel never visited or came to see her and Hüseyin. She herself spent her life tormented by her decision to leave Veysel. Once, going to the shop for groceries, Esma saw Veysel inside, and refused to go in. She instead directed a helper to buy the groceries for her by making signs outside the window, leaving without saying a word. Veysel had been in the midst of a conversation with the shopkeeper. Asking who else had gone into the store, the shopkeeper lied—presumably to avoid any awkwardness—and told Veysel that no one had come in. Veysel continued to insist otherwise. The conversation was joined by another man, visiting from a nearby village, who told Veysel, "Şatıroğlu, you are deceiving us, you cannot be blind, how would you know, how would you know?" Veysel, who had been getting steadily more and more upset, finally struck the table with his hand and cried, "because of the smell, the smell!" Veysel had recognized the scent of Esma's perfume. In person, however, he was decidedly colder to Esma; Esma once walked past his house and saw Veysel in the garden, eating grapes. Esma allegedly asked Veysel what he was eating, to which Veysel replied, "can't you see that I'm eating grapes?" Esma then asked if she could have one. Veysel, who was known to give away his own produce for free, retorted that if Esma wanted produce from his house, then she should have stayed in it.

In Veysel's final days, on learning that her first husband was on his deathbed, Esma came to Veysel's house, wishing to say goodbye to him. Veysel's daughter Hayrire again went to her father, who gave his permission. However, Esma did not have the courage to enter Veysel's room, saying: "I made that man suffer a lot, and God made me miserable. How dare I say goodbye to him?" She then fled the house. Esma died shortly after Veysel.

Gülizar, Veysel's second wife, was "never jealous of Esma", and was kind to her, despite both women's disparate views towards Veysel.

==== Other companions ====
Âşık "Cort" İbrahim Tutuş (born 1892) was Veysel's cousin, the son of his aunt. He was Veysel's closest friend and first traveling companion. From 1927 to 1940, İbrahim and Veysel travelled together across the country, appearing in several interviews and press releases together, as well as making several joint records. He was also the man chosen by Veysel to escort Gülizar to Sivrialan. Despite being two years older, İbrahim was typically perceived as being his cousin's junior, both in age and profession, and tended to default to Veysel in interviews and public appearances. Because Veysel was blind, İbrahim also acted as his guide and assistant. Veysel affectionately referred to İbrahim as "gözlerim" ("my eyes"). İbrahim and Veysel had a falling out in Tarsus in 1940, after which İbrahim's name disappears from the historical record.

Âşık "Küçük" Veysel Erkılıc (born 1908) was Veysel's travelling companion from 1940. Also an ashik, he shared Âşık Veysel's name and had a singing voice that was "indistinguishable" from Âşık Veysel's; as such, Erkılıc's nickname was "Little Veysel". He died from a heart attack in 1960.

Ahmet Şatıroğlu (born 1934) was Veysel's eldest son, later his travelling companion after the death of Veysel Erkılıc. Ahmet accompanied Veysel to many Village Institutes, even feeding his father on several occasions. He died in 2018.

== Personality ==
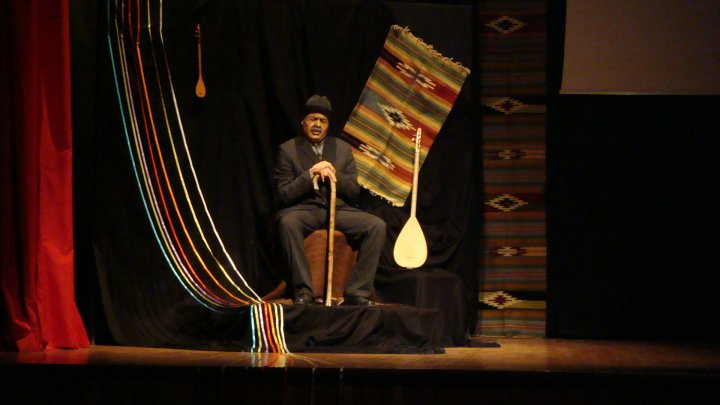
Depiction of Veysel in a wax museum

In the highly charged religious and political environment of 20th century Turkey, Veysel was particularly noted for his humanist philosophy. He spent much of his life experiencing prejudice both in Sivrialan and throughout Anatolia, for various reasons; his status as an Alevi Muslim, his profession, poverty, and blindness, were only a few of the criticisms directed at Veysel throughout his lifetime. Perhaps because of his own suffering, Veysel constantly encouraged cooperation and friendship between all social classes and sects. In a conversation where he was warned to speak carefully, due to the arrival of two Sunni Muslims (Veysel and the others present were Sufis), Veysel grew angry and insisted on the equal treatment of all those present. Although he was himself a Muslim, Veysel also did not make distinctions between those of other religions, and treated them the same.

Despite holding strong views, Veysel disliked conflict. He either avoided or ignored it when he came across it in his travels, and generally responded to criticism with silence. In one notable incident, at the Gülköy Village Institute in 1944, Veysel was working as a saz instructor alongside another aşık, İhsan Ozanoğlu. Ozanoğlu challenged Veysel to a flyting match. Veysel declined, suggesting that he did not know how to compose in the suggested style; however, it is almost certain that he simply did not want to participate, rather than because he lacked the actual skill. The match took place anyway, with Veysel appearing very physically uncomfortable, and responding to Ozanoğlu's attacks with difficulty. Both men derided the other's appearance, with Ozanoğlu mocking Veysel's blindness, and Veysel ridiculing Ozanoğlu for his myopia and short height (it is presumable that Veysel's son Ahmet must have told his father what Ozanoğlu looked like). Veysel ended the flyte after only six stanzas of invective exchange, and never participated again in another such match.

=== Humour ===
Popular perception of Veysel, both during and after his lifetime, conceived of the minstrel as a retreating and melancholic figure. In reality, Veysel was described in closer circles as being a quick witted and cheerful person. Accounts of the more mischievous side of Veysel's personality were brought to light after his death. In one, Veysel was caught in a debate that had broken out over the miniskirt, a new fashion at the time. Some thought it excessive; others argued that it was a personal choice. Veysel interrupted the argument, saying, "what is this you are describing, at least let me feel it with my hand," and grabbed the leg of the miniskirt-wearing woman sitting beside him, to the amusement of those present. In another anecdote, the winner of the local Sivas beauty pageant had made a visit to Sivrialan, Veysel's village. Veysel called the beauty to him and made as if to say something in her ear. When she bent down, he kissed her on the cheek. In the ensuing hilarity, Veysel laughed and responded, "bless my eyes, I did nothing." He frequently swore on his eyes for comedic effect, usually finishing anecdotes with a variation of, "If I am lying, may I be blind in both eyes." Veysel also liked to smoke (he smoked tobacco) and drink rakı. He coughed a lot, and was once told that smoking was the cause, to which he replied, "I know, I know. Isn't the point of smoking to cough, anyway?" His wife Gulizar also scolded him for drinking whilst he was in recovery for stomach surgery (Veysel had promised to quit alcohol). When caught, he told his wife, "I quit and now I am celebrating."

Other jokes of which Veysel was fond, were frequently used when he had been engaged to play at concerts or as mealtime entertainment, typically to ward off any potential awkwardness. If he thought a conversation had been going on for too long, Veysel was fond of indicating it by saying, "we ate and drank and the saz died of hunger." If he thought his audience was being too noisy, he would pretend to listen his saz's sound box, remarking, "is this noise coming from the saz?" Veysel was also occasionally asked about his playing style; he used the "Aşık Düzeni" (Aşık Pattern) of playing, instead of the more widespread "Normal Düzeni" (Normal Pattern), the former of which involved less extensive movement along the saz's fingerboard. In response, Veysel replied, "I have found the right place, why would I leave it? The others are still looking for the place I found." He used jokes like these to avoid controversy, though not always; he once spent so long tuning his saz that a member of the audience asked him to hurry up. Indicating his instrument, Veysel retorted, "if we don't turn its ear once in a while, it becomes out of tune, just like you!"

Veysel often made jokes about his blindness. A friend of his, Veysel Kaymak, recorded him as saying, "stand away from the blind man, when he waves his cane, he will hit you!" He also used similar jokes when his companions forgot that Veysel was blind; in another incident, Âşık Veysel and a companion, Kul Ahmet, were travelling to Amasya. Kul Ahmet caught sight of a geological formation that was featured in the Persian legend of Khosrow and Shirin, and asked Veysel "somewhat sarcastically" if Veysel saw the rocks too, to which Veysel replied drily, "I'm not blind, Kul Ahmet, of course I see them." Although he typically did not take offence to such mistakes, this was not always the case; a neighbour once visited Veysel in the hospital, and insisted on speaking to him excessively loudly. When the neighbour had left, Veysel remarked, "I knew I was blind, but I just learned I was deaf." He was otherwise happy to poke fun at himself. In an anecdote recalled by his friend Erdoğan Alkan, Alkan had been lighting a cigarette for Veysel. Out of habit, Alkan asked Veysel if the cigarette was lit. Veysel laughed, replying, "why are you asking me? Check the tip of my nose. If there is smoke, it's lit." Another incident involving Alkan saw Veysel and his son Ahmet having dinner in Alkan's home. Alkan served them a local delicacy, bulgur meatballs. Veysel took a spoonful and put it in his mouth, only to realize that he had taken three in one go, crying, "I took three meatballs like a blind man!" In a similar incident, he was once at a dinner and was being served rakı, which Veysel drank by alternating sips of rakı and water. He was handed a glass of water instead of rakı, either on purpose or by accident, and grimaced, asking, "why did you give me the water first?" The person serving him, either his daughter Zöhre or a guest, replied, "I gave it to you and you took it yourself", to which Veysel responded, "I am blind. Are you blind too?" Once handed a sketch of himself and asked by the artist what he thought of it. Veysel commented, "you did very well, but you made my eyes all squinty" (Veysel always had his eyes closed, even when walking). He also liked practical jokes. Alkan reported that Veysel, for a joke, once took four eggs and made a hole in them, eating the insides and leaving the shell apparently whole. Veysel then took the eggs to a neighbour's house to look after. On leaving some time later, Veysel went to take the empty eggs, made a show of breaking them, and pretended the scold the neighbour, insisting, "you gave me empty eggs because I am blind!"

Conversely, he was known to occasionally make fun of others for not being blind; he was once visited at an acquaintance's house by several French ethnomusicologists, escorted by the mayor of Sivas. The visitors had plans to stay with one of Veysel's relatives in Sivrialan, so Veysel left with them later that evening. Despite the road, which was unlit, unpaved, unfenced (it had sheer drops on either side), and very muddy, Veysel knew the way very well and was walking at a brisk pace. His companions—who could not see in the dark—fumbled in the mud and called for Veysel to slow down. Unfortunately, Veysel found this deeply amusing. He insisted on keeping the same pace, telling them to make note of where he placed his feet, all while teasing the others ("are you blind?"). At one point, Veysel heard the mayor slip and fall in the mud behind him. Not knowing it was the mayor who had fallen, Veysel cheerily called out: "the first blind man has fallen into the mud!"

=== Veysel in modern media ===
Since Veysel's death, modern scholars have criticized the tendency to idolize Veysel, particularly in social media. This has led to extensive dissemination of false information about Veysel's life and character, continuing a misrepresentation of Veysel's personality that was widespread even during his lifetime. His character and works were also subject to state propaganda, both while he was alive and long after his death.

Because of his own fame, other aspects of Veysel's personality went largely ignored in popular culture. The most typically cited example is the legend surrounding Veysel and his first wife, Esma. According to the legend, Veysel was aware that Esma was planning to run away with her lover, and secretly put money in her socks so that she would not be in want. Whilst this story is widespread on social media and in biographies of Veysel, it is demonstrably untrue. Veysel himself was frequently an unreliable source. He could be deliberately evasive in interviews, and would change details of events; there are two versions of the story explaining how he lost the sight in his right eye, both of which originate from Veysel himself. He would switch between both stories throughout his lifetime. It has not been proven which one is true.

Veysel also had a suspicious side to his personality that is not well reflected in modern biographies of him. This was first seen in the relationship between Veysel and Esma.

== In popular culture ==
Veysel's life has been depicted in a range of media and literature. His poems and songs have also been extensively adapted an reinterpreted across multiple music genres, and used in a variety of media.

=== Film ===
- The Dark World (Turkish: Karanlık Dünya) (1952), directed by Metin Erksan, a biopic based on Veysel's life; Veysel himself, along with his guide Veysel Erkılıç, appear in the latter portion of the film. It was censored due to its unfavourable portrayal of agriculture in Anatolia.
- Aşık (2016), directed by Bilal Babaoğlu and starring Uğur Aslan, also a biopic on Veysel
- Deine Schönheit ist nichts wert (English: Your Beauty is Worth Nothing) (2012), by German director Hüseyin Tabak, a film about a 12-year old Turkish immigrant named Veysel, migrating with his family to Austria. Âşık Veysel's eponymous song Güzelliğin On Para Etmez is also featured in the film.

=== Television ===
- Gece Gündüz (2008) featured Veysel's song "Uzun İnce Bir Yoldayım" in its title sequence. The show's name (English: Day and Night) is also a reference to the song.

=== Theater ===
- Âşık Veysel (2020), stage play biopic of Veysels life, written by Osman Nuri Ercan

=== Music ===
- Âşık Veysel (2008), song by American guitarist Joe Satriani, featured in his 2008 album Professor Satchafunkilus and the Musterion of Rock. The track Andalusia, featured in the same album, was also inspired by Veysel

== Family tree ==
Veysel's family tree is given as follows:

Şatıroğlu family

Ibrahim; Ulu
Ali Ulu "Şatıroğlu"
Karaca Ahmet Şatıroğlu d. 1921	Gülizar Keçecigillerden d. 1921
Yeter	Ali Rüstem Şatıroğlu d. 1956	Esma Haydar	Veysel Şatıroğlu; 1894-1973	Gulizar Ertemür; 1886-1991	Elif Şatıroğlu; ~1896-1973
Esme	Muharrem Şatıroğlu	Gülizar Şatıroğlu	Fadime Şatıroğlu	Ali Şatıroğlu d. ~1919	Elif Şatıroğlu d. ~1921	Zöhre Şatıroğlu; 1935-2020	Veli Başer	Ahmet Şatıroğlu; 1934-2018	Türkan Ertemur	Hüseyin Şatıroğlu ?-?	Menekşe Satıroğlu b. 1937	Ahmet Süzer	Bahri Şatıroğlu; 1941-2021	Suzan	Zekine Şatıroğlu b. 1941	Mustafa Şatıroğlu d. 2019	Hayriye Şatıroğlu b. 1943	Hüseyin Özer
Güldane Şatıroğlu	Yeter Şatıroğlu	Ali Şatıroğlu	Cevriye Şatıroğlu b. 1962	Sebahattin Şatıroğlu b. 1968	Cemal Şatıroğlu; 1972-2011	Nazender Suzer	Halil Suzer	Gülizar Suzer	Hayrettin Suzer	Filiz Şatıroğlu	Gündüz Şatıroğlu	Yıldız Şatıroğlu	Yeliz Şatıroğlu	Rüstem Şatıroğlu b. 1962	Lale Şatıroğlu	Doğan Şatıroğlu	Solmaz Özer	Alaettin Özer	Şemsi Özer	Fatma Özer	Çiğdem Özer

== Uzun İnce Bir Yoldayım (lyrics) ==
"Uzun İnce Bir Yoldayım" (English: "I'm on a Long and Narrow Road") is one of Veysel's best known works and is still popular among fans of Turkish folk music.

Turkish Lyrics
Uzun ince bir yoldayım,
Gidiyorum gündüz gece,
Bilmiyorum ne haldeyim,
Gidiyorum gündüz gece.

Dünyaya geldiğim anda,
Yürüdüm aynı zamanda,
İki kapılı bir handa
Gidiyorum gündüz gece.

Uykuda dahi yürüyom,
Kalmaya sebep arıyom,
Gidenleri hep görüyom,
Gidiyorum gündüz gece

Kırk dokuz yıl bu yollarda
Ovada dağda çöllerde,
Düşmüşüm gurbet ellerde
Gidiyorum gündüz gece.

Düşünülürse derince,
Uzak görünür görünce,
Yol bir dakka miktarınca
Gidiyorum gündüz gece.

Şaşar Veysel iş bu hale
Gah ağlaya gahi güle,
Yetişmek için menzile
Gidiyorum gündüz gece

Transliterated (Bekki, 2021)
Uzun ince bir yoldayım
Gediyorum gundüz gece
Bilmiyorum ne haldeyim
Gediyorum gundüz gece

Dünyaya geldiğim anda
Yörüdüm aynı zemanda
İki gapılı bir handa
Gediyorum gundüz gece

Uyhuda dahi yörüyom
Kalmaya sebep arıyom
Gedenleri ben görüyom
Gediyorum gundüz gece

Kırk dokuz yıl bu yollarda
Ovada dağda çöllerde,
Düşmüşüm gurbet ellerde
Gediyorum gundüz gece

Düşünülürse derince
Uzak görünür görünce
Yol bir dakka mihdarınca
Gediyorum gundüz gece

Şaşar Veysel iş bu hâle
Gâh ağlaya gâhi gule
Yetişmek için menzile
Gediyorum gundüz gece

English Lyrics
I'm on a long and narrow road
I'm going day and night
What state I'm in, I do not know
I'm going day and night

When first I came into this world
I started on that narrow road
And at the two-doored inn I strode
I'm going day and night

Even sleeping, I walk on
Even waking, I search on
Many seeing, all are gone
I'm going day and night

Forty-nine years on this road
On plain, on peak, in desert roam,
Through stranger lands I do not know
I'm going day and night

If I stand and deeply think
As if to nothingness it shrinks
Though the road goes in a blink
I'm going day and night

Veysel wonders at this plight
Through times of sorrow, or delight
The distant end of this to sight
I'm going day and night

== Selected works ==
- Anlatamam derdimi (5:24)
- Arasam seni gül ilen (4:18)
- Atatürk'e ağıt (5:21)
- Beni hor görme (2:46)
- Beş günlük Dünya (3:58)
- Bir kökte uzamış (4:55)
- Birlik destani (1:42)
- Çiçekler (3:05)
- Cümle âlem senindir (6:44)
- Derdimi dökersem derin dereye (4:51)
- Dost çevirmiş yüzünü benden (3:12)
- Dost yolunda (4:43)
- Dostlar beni hatırlasın (6:02)
- Dün gece yar eşiğinde (4:28)
- Dünya'ya gelmemde maksat (2:43)
- Esti bahar yeli (2:41)
- Gel ey âşık (5:35)
- Gonca gülün kokusuna (5:24)
- Gönül sana nasihatim (6:40)
- Gözyaşı armağan (3:32)
- Güzelliğin on para etmez (4:31)
- Kahpe felek (2:58)
- Kara toprak (9:25)
- Kızılırmak seni seni (4:58)
- Küçük dünyam (5:17)
- Murat (5:13)
- Ne ötersin dertli dertli (3:05)
- Necip (3:16)
- Sazım (6:02)
- Seherin vaktinde (5:01)
- Sekizinci ayın yirmi ikisi (4:43)
- Sen varsın (4:01)
- Şu geniş Dünya'ya (7:27)
- Uzun ince bir yoldayım (2:23)
- Yaz gelsin (3:02)
- Yıldız (Sivas ellerinde) (3:16)

== See also ==
- Pir Sultan Abdal
- Karacaoğlan
- Yunus Emre
- Ahmet Kaya
- Turkish folk literature
- Turkish language
- Aşık Veysel Meslek Yüksekokulu

== Sources ==
- Yıldırım, Nihal (2016). Türk Saz Şairleri Antolojisi. Istanbul: Etkileşim Yayınları. ISBN 978-605-162-434-1.
- Sarı, Emre (4 August 2006). Ünlü Halk Ozanı Aşık Veysel. Nokta Ekitap.
- Dönmez-Colin, Gönül (4 December 2013). The Routledge Dictionary of Turkish Cinema. Routledge. p. 51. ISBN 9781317937265. ISBN 1317937260
