= Sivas Cumhuriyet University =

Public university in Sivas, Turkey

Coordinates: 39.7076°N 37.0296°E

- Sivas Cumhuriyet Üniversitesi
- Former name: Cumhuriyet University
- Motto: Gelenekten Geleceğe
- Motto in English: From Tradition to Future
- Type: Public
- Established: 1974; 52 years ago
- Affiliations: EUA
- Rector: Prof. Alim Yıldız
- Faculty: 1,863
- Administrative staff: 3,557
- Students: 50,849
- Location: Sivas, Turkey
- Website: cumhuriyet.edu.tr

University rankings

Regional – Overall
- QS Emerging Europe and Central Asia: 301-350 (2022)

Sivas Cumhuriyet University (Turkish: Sivas Cumhuriyet Üniversitesi) is a public university established in Sivas, Turkey in 1973 at the 50th anniversary of Republic of Turkey. The main campus of the university is located 5 kilometers (3.1 mi) away from Sivas city center, settled in an area of 2,720 acres (1,100 ha) by Kızılırmak River. The campus is the fifth largest university campus in Turkey.

The university offers lectures, educational opportunities, cultural and sportive activities to more than 50,000 undergraduate, postgraduate and doctorate students by 2435 academic staff, cultural and sportive facilities, and libraries.

== Academics ==
Cumhuriyet University accepts students to 15 faculties, 5 institutes, 13 vocational schools and 4 separate departments attached to the university presidency in the main campus. The university uses both a 0–100 point grade scale and a relative grading scale. The academic units and the programs are listed below;

=== Faculties ===
- Faculty of Medicine
- Faculty of Dentistry
- Faculty of Architecture: Architecture, City and Regional Planning, Interior Architecture, Landscape Architecture
- Faculty of Pharmacy
- Faculty of Engineering: Chemical Engineering, Civil Engineering, Electrical & Electronics Engineering, Environmental Engineering, Food Engineering, Geological Engineering, Geophysics Engineering, Metallurgical and Materials Engineering, Mechanical Engineering, Mining Engineering, Nanotechnology Engineering, Computer Engineering
- Faculty of Science: Biology, Chemistry, Physics, Mathematics, Molecular Biology and Genetics
- Faculty of Letters: Anthropology, Archaeology, Art History, English Language and Literature, French Language and Literature, German Language and Literature, History, Modern Turkish Dialects and Literature, Philosophy, Psychology, Social Service, Sociology, Translation and Interpretation (Turkish, English, and French), Turkish Language and Literature, Turkish Public Science
- Faculty of Economics and Administrative Sciences: Business Administration, Econometrics, Economics, Finance, Labour Economics and Industrial Relations, Management Information Systems, Public Administration
- Faculty of Education: Science Education, Mathematics Education, Preschool Education, Primary Education, Elementary Mathematics Education, Turkish Education, Social Sciences Education, Religious and Moral Studies Education, Music Education, Art Education, Psychological Counseling and Guidance
- Faculty of Fine Arts: Sculpture, Painting, Music Sciences, Music Technologies
- Faculty of Communication Radio-Television-Film, Journalism, Public Relations and Publicity
- Faculty of Technical Education Mechanical Education, Electronic-Computer Education
- Faculty of Health Sciences: Nursing, Midwifery, Health Administration, Physical Therapy and Rehabilitation
- Faculty of Theology
- Faculty of Veterinary Medicine
- Faculty of Sport Sciences
- Faculty of Technology Automotive Engineering, Manufacturing Engineering, Mechatronic Engineering, Optical Engineering, Biomedical Engineering

=== Schools ===
- School of Physical Education and Sports
- School of Foreign Languages
- Vocational School of Foreign Health Services
- Vocational School of Sivas
- Vocational School of Cumhuriyet
- Vocational School of Divriği Nuri Demirağ: The vocational school was established in 1987 and named after the Turkish industrialist Nuri Demirağ.
- Vocational School of Gürün
- Vocational School of Kangal
- Vocational School of Zara Ahmet Çuhadaroğlu
- Vocational School of Yıldızeli
- Vocational School of Suşehri Timur Karabal
- Vocational School of Gemerek
- Vocational School of Şarkışla Aşık Veysel: The vocational school was established in 1994 and named after the folk poet Aşık Veysel. There is a state dormitory consisting of 4 blocks.

=== Institutes ===
- Institute of Social Sciences
- Institute of Health Sciences
- Institute of Applied Sciences

=== Counseling ===
University administration assigns an advisor to every class in the university. These advisors help students during the school registration and course renewals, about exams and university policies, and also personal problems.

=== Libraries and Computer Labs ===
The Central Library of Cumhuriyet University provides a studying environment for the students. The study halls at the capacity of 350 students, and 33 independent study rooms are currently available in the library. The collection of the library holds 50,000 journals, magazines and books. 26,000 of this collection is formed by books. Other than the central library, all of the faculties contain their own libraries, too. There are 30 computer labs including more than 700 computers all connected to the internet are available in the faculties and schools.

== University life ==
=== Transportation ===
The city has all of the main transportation services such; an airport, a train station, and a bus terminal, so arrival to Sivas is easy from every location in the World. The public transportation is available between the city and the university campus in every 5 minutes, and the bus rides take about 15 minutes.

=== Accommodation ===
A dormitory managed by 'Credit and Dormitories Foundation' (Turkish: Kredi ve Yurtlar Kurumu (KYK)) is serving to students in the campus area. The capacity of the dormitory is 1648 beds for females and 1152 beds for males, a total of 2790 beds. In addition, a student visitor house with 100 beds capacity is available for the students on campus. TOKİ houses, which are another available housing option, are in 2 kilometers distance to the university. Most of the students are being able to find housing opportunities in the center city area that is about 15 minutes bus ride to the campus.

=== Catering Services ===
One central dining hall for students and one staff dining hall for academic and administrative staff are available in the campus area. The central dining hall has the capacity to serve 5200 students at the same time. Three courses of meal at the calorie of 1,100-1,500 are served to the students and staff during the lunchtimes. More than 1,250 academically successful and low-income students are able to receive free lunch every day. There are also several cafeteria and cafes available at certain locations of the campus.

=== Sports ===
Many sports facilities and activities are available for the students in the campus area. The university provides 1 half Olympic-size swimming pool, 1 gym at the capacity of 1200 students, 1 grass soccer field, 1 water sports center and many outdoor facilities settled in 60,000 square meters area. The open sports area contains 2 synthetic soccer fields, 6 tennis fields (one of them is indoors), 1 synthetic basketball court, 1 synthetic handball court, 1 mini-golf field and 6,500 square meters service area. The facilities are serving all students between 9 am and 10 pm.

== Affiliations ==
The university is a member of the European University Association and Caucasus University Association.

== See also ==
- Education in Turkey
- List of Universities in Turkey
