= Şaziye Moral =

Turkish actress (born 1903)

- Born: 1903; Kardzali, Bulgaria
- Died: 9 April 1985 (aged 81–82); Istanbul, Turkey
- Resting place: Zincirlikuyu Cemetery
- Occupations: Stage, film and voice actress
- Years active: 1919–1977

Şaziye Moral (1903 – 9 April 1985) was a Turkish female stage and film actress and voice actress. She was the second Muslim stage actress in Turkey.

== Early years ==
Şaziye Moral was born to ethnic Turkish parents in Kardzali, Bulgaria in 1903. Her mother died during her birth, and her father died after a couple of years. After the Balkan Wars (1912–1913), she moved to Istanbul, then Ottoman Empire, by mingling with the Rumelian immigrants. She was raised by her relatives. She completed the primary and middle school in Kocamustafapaşa, Istanbul. She dropped out the high school in the last grade, and started to earn money in order not to be a burden to her relatives.

== Acting career ==
She entered as a clerk in an agency dealing with general services in Beyazıt, Istanbul, which ran its own theatre "Yeni Hayat Tiyatrosu" (literally "New Life Theatre"). The theatre folded and after some time the actors left. For its re-establishment, she was offered to go on stage. She accepted the offer at a time when Muslim women actors were uncommon. Her acting career began in 1919 with her first performance in Cemal Yakup's play Kıtık Kalp ("Broken Hearth"). She was taken to the police station by a group of people, and sued for appearing on stage as a Muslim woman. She was acquitted in the court. She then went on a tour in Anatolia. After her return to Istanbul, she entered Istanbul City Theatres. In 1921, the City Theatres announced that Muslim women were officially not allowed to perform acting on stage. She became the second Muslim stage actress after Afife Jale (1902–1941).

After performing in more than two hundred plays on stage and acting in more than eighty movies, she retired in 1977.

== Death ==
Şaziye Moral died in Istanbul at the age of 82 on 9 April 1985. She was interred at Zincirlikuyu Cemetery following a memorial held at the Harbiye Muhsin Ertuğrul Stage and the religious funeral service at Şişli Mosque.

== Filmography ==
Year	Film	Role	Genre
1928	Bir Sigara Yüzünden		Comedy (short film)
1944	Hürriyet Apartmanı		Drama, romance
1946	Sonsuz Acı		
1949	Fedakar Ana	Nesibe	Drama
1952	Son Gece		Drama, romance, war
1952	Yavuz Sultan Selim Ağlıyor		Drama, war
1953	Soygun		
1954	Leylaklar Altında		Drama, romance
1955	Ilk ve son		Drama, romance
1956	Büyük Sır		Drama
1956	Ölmüş Bir Kadının Evrakı Metrukesı		Drama, romance
1956	Kara Çalı		Drama
1956	Hayırsız Evlat		Drama
1957	Berduş		Comedy, drama, romance
1957	Çoban Aşkı		Romance
1957	Fırtına Geçti		
1957	Dertli Gelin Şirvan		Drama, romance
1957	Anası Gibi	Kamile Hanım	Drama, romance
1958	Yaprak Dökümü		Drama, family
1958	Tilki Leman		Romance
1959	Samanyolu		Drama, romance
1959	Poyraz Osman		
1959	Ömrüm Böyle Geçti		Drama
1959	Kanundan Kaçılmaz		Drama
1960	Aşk Hırsızı	Zeki's mother	Romance
1960	Yeşil Köşkün Lambası		Romance
1961	Aşkın Saati Gelince		Romance
1961	Derbeder		Drama, romance
1961	İki Aşk Arasında		Drama, romance
1961	Kızıl Vazo		Drama
1961	Üzümcü Kızın Kaderi		Drama, romance
1961	Melekler Şahidimdir		Drama, adventure
1961	Küçük Hanımefendi		Drama, romance
1961	Gönülden Gönüle		Romance
1961	Bülbül Yuvası		Drama, romance
1962	Sonbahar Yaprakları		Drama, romance
1962	Allah Seviniz Dedi		Romance, drama
1962	Billur Köşk		Romance
1962	Mağrur Kadın		Drama, romance
1962	Hayat Bazen Tatlıdır		Comedy, romance
1962	Aşka Kinim Var	Mother	Romance
1963	Yaralı Ceylan		Drama
1963	Aşk Tomucukları		Drama, romance
1963	Sıralardaki Heyecanlar		Comedy, romance
1963	Akdeniz Şarkısı		Drama, romance
1964	Acı Aşk		Drama, family, romance
1964	Sarı Kızla Kopuk Ahmet		Drama, romance
1964	Taşralı Kız	Zehra (Necmi's mother)	Drama, romance
1965	Sonsuz Geceler	İffet	Drama
1965	Zehirli Hayat		Drama
1966	Garibim Çalıkuşu		Romance
1967	Bir Şöförün Gizli Defteri	Mother Hüsniye	Drama, romance
1967	Paşa Kızı		Drama, romance
1967	Ölümsüz Kadın		Romance, drama
1967	Acı Günler		Drama
1968	Aşka Tövbe	Mübin	Drama, romance
1968	Kader Böyle İstedi	Hanife Hanım	Drama, romance
1968	Efkarlı Sosyetede		Comedy, romance
1968	katip		Drama, romance
1968	Kanun Naına		Crime, drama
1968	Kadın Severse		Romance, drame
1968	Arkadaşımın Aşkı		Drama, romance
1969	Son Mektup		Drama, romance
1969	Ölmüs bir Kadının Mektupları		Drama, romance
1969	Muhabbet Koşu		Drama, romance
1969	Lekeli Melek		Drama, romance
1969	Günah Bende mi?	Grandmother	Drama, romance
1969	Dost Hançeri		Drama, romance
1969	Dağlar Şahini		Drama
1969	Ana Yüreği		Drama
1969	Altın Kalpler		Comedy, romance
1970	Yaralı Ceylan		Drama
1970	Söz Müdafaanın		Dtama
1970	Küçük Hanımefendi		Romance
1970	Birleşen Yollar		Romance
1970	Cafer Bey	Grandmother	Comedy
1971	Üvey Ana		Drama
1971	Aşkımı Kanla Yazdım		
1972	Yağmur		Drama
1973	Cennetin Kapısı		Drama, romance
1975	Haydi Gençlik Hop Hop Hop		Adventure, romance
1977	Bizim Kız		Comedy, romance
1977	Sevgili Dayım	Şaziye	Comedy, romance
1978	Bir Adam Yaratmak		Drama (TV minis series)
