= Aşık Veysel Meslek Yüksekokulu =

Vocational college in Turkey

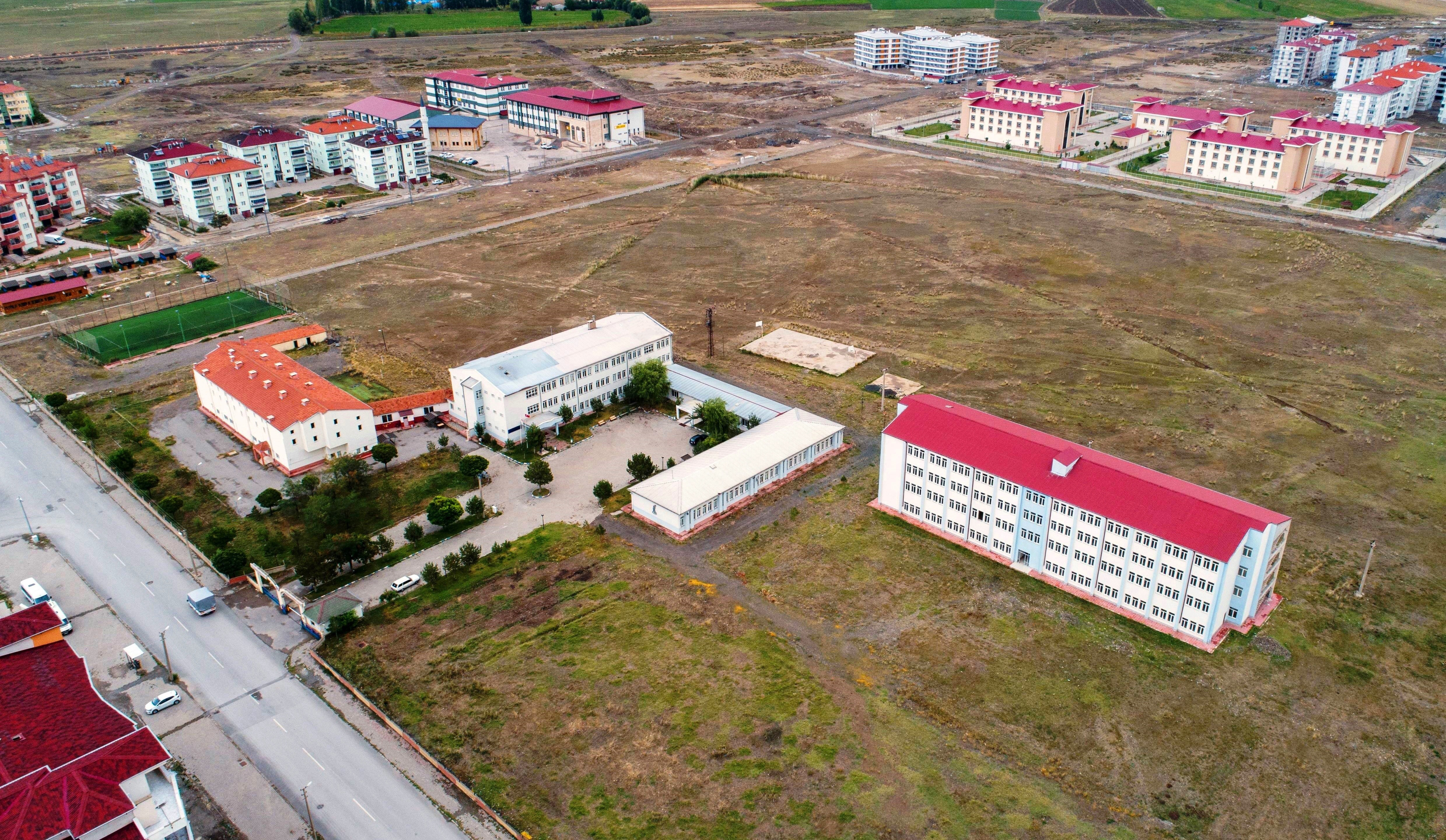
Aşık Veysel Meslek Yüksekokulu

Aşık Veysel Meslek Yüksekokulu (en. Vocational High School of Aşık Veysel) is a higher education provider vocational school in Şarkışla the district of Sivas Province in Turkey.

It was established in 1994, and affiliated to Sivas Cumhuriyet University. The school was named after the folk poet Aşık Veysel. It serves approximately over 700 students every year.

== Address ==
Yıldırım neighbourhood district, Hospital Street, 58400 Şarkışla/Sivas

=== Transport ===
Âşık Veysel Vocational School is located right across the Şarkışla State Hospital.

== Departments ==
- Banks and insurance companies,
- Financial management,
- Office management,
- Child development,
- Pharmacy services,
- Public relations,
- Veterinary laboratory.

=== Research areas ===
Practice-based research is given importance in the school, e.g. studies on poultry have made important contributions in this field. Furtherly studies have been made about "Attitude for Plastic Wastes and Recycling". However, there are also studies based on theoretical or historical data. Important studies have been made on the accounting system of Sumerians.

== Student Dormitory ==
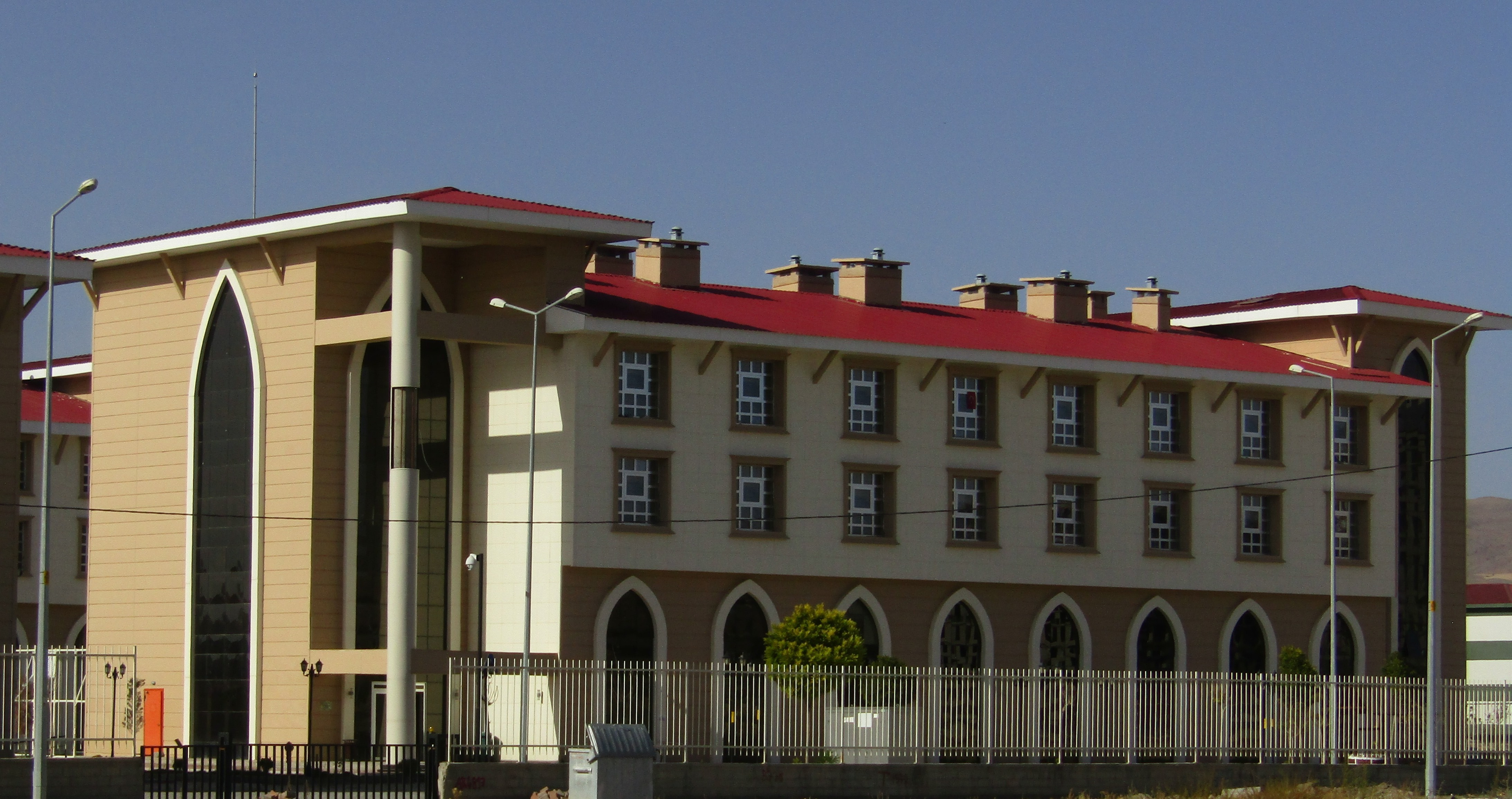
Dormitory Building (Front Block -1)

There is a state dormitory consisting of 4 blocks.

== Events ==
A commemorate ceremony for folk poet Aşık Veysel is held every year on March 21, the anniversary of the poet's death. Students are transported to Sivrialan village by vehicles. The students sing his songs in choir. It has become a tradition to cut a cake and sing folk songs in the school building on Aşık Veysel's birthday.

== International cooperation ==
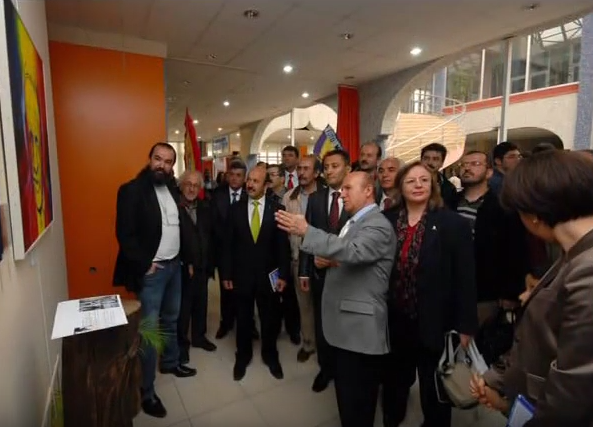
Painter Seyfeddin Soysal in his personal exhibition with Prof.Dr. Yaşar Serin

A commemoration was held every year for Turkish-based Dutch painter Seyfeddin Soysal (died in 2012). Students from Denmark's Marselisborg Gymnasium visited the school in March 2010.

== Sources ==
- Cumhuriyet Üniversitesi - 2018 yılı faaliyet raporu / Cumhuriyet University - 2018 annual activity report (Turkish)
- Aşık Veysel Meslek Yüksekokulu Tanıtım Broşürü / Aşık Veysel Vocational School Publicity Brochure, 2019 (Turkish)

== See also ==
- Aşık Veysel
