= The Angel of Vengeance – The Female Hamlet =

1977 film

- Directed by: Metin Erksan
- Written by: Metin Erksan; William Shakespeare
- Produced by: Metin Erksan
- Starring: Fatma Girik
- Cinematography: Cahit Engin
- Release date: July 1977
- Running time: 86 minutes
- Country: Turkey
- Language: Turkish

The Angel of Vengeance – The Female Hamlet (Turkish: İntikam Meleği – Kadın Hamlet) is a 1977 Turkish drama film directed by Metin Erksan. It was entered into the 10th Moscow International Film Festival.

== Cast ==
- Fatma Girik as Hamlet
- Sevda Ferdag as Her Mother
- Reha Yurdakul as Her Uncle
- Orçun Sonat
- Ahmet Sezerel as Orhan
- Yüksel Gözen
- Yavuz Selekman
- Ihsan Gedik
- Baki Tamer
- Coskun Gögen
