= Time to Love (1965 film) =

- Theatrical Poster
- Directed by: Metin Erksan
- Written by: Metin Erksan; Kemal Demirel
- Produced by: Metin Erksan
- Starring: Müşfik Kenter; Sema Özcan; Adnan Uygur; Fadıl Garan; Osman Karahan; Oya Bulaner; Süleyman Tekcan
- Cinematography: Mengü Yeğin
- Music by: Metin Bükey
- Release date: 1965
- Running time: 84 minutes
- Country: Turkey
- Language: Turkish

Time to Love (Turkish: Sevmek Zamanı) is a 1965 Turkish drama film, produced, co-written and directed by Metin Erksan, featuring Müşfik Kenter as a poor painter who falls in love with a photograph of a woman (Sema Özcan) while at work in one of the massive villas on Istanbul's Princes' Islands.

== Plot ==
While working on a villa on Istanbul's Princes' Islands, Halil visits a photograph of a woman he has been gazing at all summer. The woman, Meral, is from a wealthy family. She finds herself drawn to Halil, but when she attempts to connect with him, Halil rejects her. The two have a back-and-forth romance; when one gets close, the other draws away. Halil feels he is poor, and not worthy of Meral's love. Eventually, Meral returns to Istanbul and gets engaged to a wealthy but brutish man, Basar, who she does not love.

Halil realizes he loves Meral and wants to be at her but mourns that he is too late. Lamenting, he steals a mannequin donned in a wedding gown as it reminds him of Meral, and takes it out on a boat. Meral runs from her wedding and finds Halil on the boat. He picks her up, and the two are finally united. At that moment, Basar arrives and shoots the lovers dead. Regretting his actions, Basar collapses against a tree in tears.

== See also ==
- 1965 in film
