= The Wound of Separation =

- Film poster
- Directed by: Metin Erksan
- Screenplay by: Metin Erksan
- Produced by: Nazif Duru
- Starring: Sadri Alışık, Mualla Kaynak, Neşe Yulaç, Kani Kıpçak, Cahit Irgat, Refik Kemal Arduman, ibrahim Delideniz, Feridun Çölgeçen, Müfit Kiper, Vahi Öz, Neşet Berküren, Cahide Sonku, Abdurrahman Palay, Kemal Tözem, Şakir Arseven
- Cinematography: Kemal Akkavuk
- Production company: Atlas Film
- Release date: 1957
- Country: Turkey
- Language: Turkish

The Wound of Separation (Turkish: Hicran Yarası) is a 1957 Turkish romantic drama film directed by Metin Erksan. It stars Sadri Alisik, Mualla Kaynak, and Nese Yulaç.
