= Farhad and Shirin Monument =

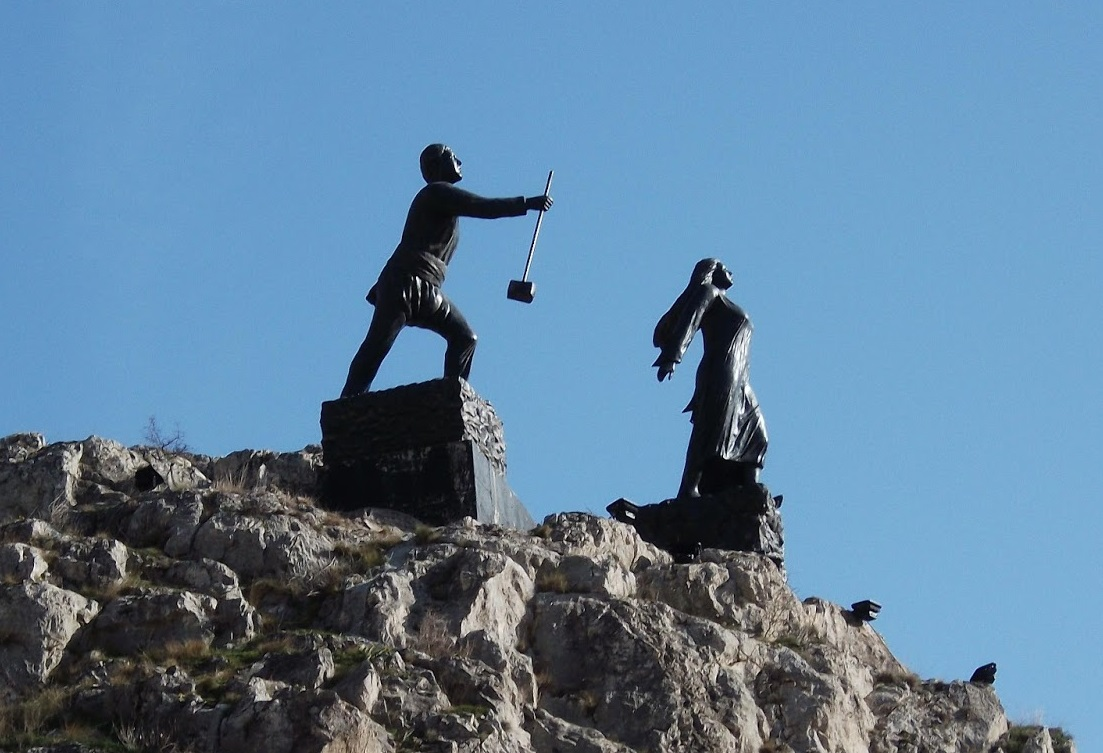
- Farhad and Shirin Monument in Amasya
- Location: Amasya, Turkey
- Coordinates: 40.6325°N 35.8119°E
- Material: Bronze
- Height: 5 m (16 ft)
- Opening date: December 2012
- Dedicated to: Farhad and Shirin

Farhad and Shirin Monument (Turkish: Ferhat ile Şirin Heykeli) is a monument atop a rocky hill in Amasya, northern Turkey dedicated to the story about the tragic romance between Farhad and Shirin.

The monument, erected by December 2012, features the bronze statues of Ferhat with a crowbar in his hand and Şirin about to jump down from the hilltop to commit suicide. The statues are 5 m (16 ft) tall.

== The legend ==
The legend of Ferhat and Shirin is the Anatolian version of Khosrow and Shirin, the famous tragic love story by the Persian poet Nizami Ganjavi (1141–1209). The folkloric tale is about the young muralist Farhad, who decorates mansions. He falls in love with Armenian princess Shirin as he was commissioned to decorate her villa, which was built by Şirin's sister Mehmene Banu, the female ruler of Amasya. Ferhat asks the ruler to give Şirin in marriage. Unwilling to agree, she demands that Ferhat has to bring water to the town from a far distance spring by digging a water tunnel in the nearby mountain. Ferhat digs the rocks with a crowbar. As the ruler learns that Ferhat is proceeding successfully, she sends a hag to Ferhat to tell him that Şirin has died. Upon the sad message, Ferhat throws his crowbar in the air, which hits his head while falling down. As Şirin learns about the incident, she rushes to the site, witnesses her lover is dead, and commits suicide by jumping down from the hilltop.
