= The White Hell =

- Film poster
- Directed by: Metin Erksan
- Screenplay by: Metin Erksan
- Based on: Beyaz Cehennem by Peyami Safa
- Produced by: Nazif Duru
- Starring: Turan Seyfioglu; Avni Dilligil; Neriman Köksal; Neşet Berküren; Müfit Kiper
- Cinematography: Fethi Mürenler
- Edited by: Zafer Davutoglu (montage)
- Music by: Orhan Barlas
- Production company: Atlas Film
- Release date: 1954
- Running time: 88 minutes
- Country: Turkey
- Language: Turkish

The White Hell (Turkish: Beyaz Cehennem) is a 1954 Turkish crime adventure film written and directed by Metin Erksan, based on a Peyami Safa novel also named Beyaz Cehennem. It stars Turan Seyfioglu, Avni Dilligil, and Neriman Köksal.
