= Bican Efendi Vekilharç =

1921 film

Bican Efendi Vekilharç is a 1921 Turkish film directed by Şadi Karagözoğlu. It stars Karagözoğlu, Bayan Şadi, Galip Arcan, Behzat Butak, Nurettin Şefkati, Şehper Karagözoğlu, and Behzat Haki. The 22 minute comedy film is one of Turkey's earliest comedy films. Bican Efendi, who served as a steward in a mansion is the centre of the story in the movie.
