= Metin Erksan =

Turkish film director (1929–2012)

- Born: İsmet Metin; 1 January 1929; Çanakkale, Turkey
- Died: 4 August 2012 (aged 83); Istanbul, Turkey
- Education: Pertevniyal High School; Istanbul University
- Awards: Golden Bear Award (1964), Golden Boll Award for Best Director (1969), Golden Orange Honorary Award (1987)

İsmet Metin Erksan (1 January 1929 – 4 August 2012) was a Turkish film director and art historian.

== Biography ==
Erksan was born in Çanakkale. Following his graduation from Pertevniyal High School in Istanbul, he studied art history at Istanbul University.

Starting in 1947, he wrote in various newspapers and magazines on cinema. In 1952, he debuted in directing with the films Karanlık Dünya and Aşık Veysel’in Hayatı written by Bedri Rahmi Eyüboğlu. He directed two documentary films in 1954 with the title Büyük Menderes Vadisi.

Metin Erksan gained success with films depicting the problems of people from the countryside he adopted from the literature. Susuz Yaz won the Golden Bear Award in Berlin, Germany. Yılanların Öcü (1962) was awarded in 1966 at the Carthage Film Festival in Tunisia. He was named "Best Director" with his film Kuyu (1968) at the first edition of International Adana Golden Boll Film Festival. Along with renowned film director Halit Refiğ, he was credited as the representative of the national cinema in Turkey.

From 1970 on, he directed films aimed for commercial success. In 1974-1975, he filmed five Turkish stories (Hanende Melek by Sabahattin Ali, Geçmiş Zaman Elbiseleri by Ahmet Hamdi Tanpınar, Bir İntihar by Samet Ağaoğlu, Müthiş Bir Tren by Sait Faik Abasıyanık and Sazlık by Hulusi Koray) as short films for television. His 1977 film The Angel of Vengeance – The Female Hamlet was entered into the 10th Moscow International Film Festival. His 1974 horror movie Şeytan is known as the "Turkish Exorcist" due to the movies' similar plots.

He directed 42 films, 2 of which he produced himself; and wrote the scripts of 29 films. He also starred in the 1998 film Alim Hoca as the title character.

He died on 4 August 2012 at the age of 83 in a hospital in Bakırköy, Istanbul, having been hospitalized ten days earlier with kidney failure.

== Awards ==
- At the Competition of Turkish Films 1961 (Türk Filmleri Yarışması, 1961), he won the Best Script award for the film Gecelerin Ötesi (Beyond Nights).
- In 1964 he won the Golden Bear award at the 14th Berlin International Film Festival for the film Susuz Yaz (Dry Summer), starring Hülya Koçyiğit and Erol Taş, adapted from a short novel by Necati Cumalı.
- At the 1st İzmir International Fair Film Festival of 1965, he won the award for Best Directing for the film Suçlular Aramızda (The guilty is among us).
- At the 1st Adana Golden Cocoon Film Festival in 1969, he won the award for Best Directing and the Best Film for the film Kuyu (Well).
- At the 24th Antalya Film Festival in 1987, he received the Honor Award.

== Filmography ==
- The Dark World (1953)
- The White Hell (1954)
- Murder in Yolpalas (1955)
- Ölmüş Bir Kadının Evrakı Metrukesi (1956)
- Dokuz Dağın Efesi (1958)
- The Wound of Separation (1959)
- Nebahat, the Driver (1960)
- Beyond the Nights (1960)
- The Quarter Friends (1961)
- Oy Farfara Farfara (1961)
- Revenge of the Snakes (1962)
- The False Marriage (1962)
- Çifte Kumrular (1962)
- Bitter Life (1962)
- Dry Summer (1964)
- Pavements of Istanbul (1964)
- Suçlular Aramızda (1964)
- Time to Love (1965)
- Immortal Love (1966)
- Kuyu (1968)
- Reyhan (1969)
- Ateşli Çingene (1969)
- Sevenler Ölmez (1970)
- Eyvah (1970)
- Makber (1971)
- Hicran (1971)
- Feride (1971)
- Keloglan ile Cankiz (1972)
- Süreyya (1972)
- Dağdan İnme (1973)
- Şeytan (1974)
- Hanende Melek (1975) (TV Movie)
- A Horrible Train (1975) (TV Movie)
- The Marsh (1975) (TV Movie)
- Geçmiş Zaman Elbiseleri (1975) (TV Movie)
- A Suicide (1975) (TV Movie)
- The Angel of Vengeance – The Female Hamlet (1977)
- I Cannot Live Without You (1977)
- Preveze Öncesi (1977) (TV Mini-Series)

== Notes ==
- Biyografi.net - Biography of Metin Erksan (in Turkish)

Awards
Preceded by newly established	Golden Boll Award for Best Director; 1969 for Kuyu	Succeeded by Bilge Olgaç
Preceded by not awarded	Golden Orange Honorary Award; 1987	Succeeded by not awarded
