= The Dark World (1953 film) =

1953 film by Metin Erksan

- Film poster
- Directed by: Metin Erksan
- Written by: Bedri Rahmi Eyuboglu
- Produced by: Nazif Duru
- Starring: Âşık Veysel, Ayfer Feray, and Kemal Öz
- Cinematography: Fethi Mürenler
- Music by: Orhan Barlas
- Production company: Atlas Film
- Release date: 1953
- Running time: 60 minutes
- Country: Turkey
- Language: Turkish

The Dark World (Turkish: Karanlık Dünya), also known as Aşık Veysel'ın Hayatı, is a 1953 Turkish biographical drama film directed by Metin Erksan, and written by Bedri Rahmi Eyuboglu. It stars Âşık Veysel, Ayfer Feray, and Kemal Öz.

Erksan's debut film, it is often described as being "a realistic account of the life of the bard Veysel, shot in his native village". The film was censored because of the showing of the meagre growth of crops in Anatolia.

== Plot ==
The life of Âşık Veysel: In Sivrialan Village in Sivas, a smallpox epidemic turns into an outbreak, leading to the deaths of many children. This disease also affects seven-year-old Veysel's eyes. One day, a saz brought by his father becomes a companion to Veysel. Over time, as a young man, Veysel marries and has a child. However, due to unexpected developments in his married life, Veysel ends up alone with his infant and his saz. Gradually, Veysel’s name becomes known throughout the country as Âşık Veysel.
