= Mâni =

Mâni is a form of Turkish folk song in quatrains.
