= Dokuz Dağın Efesi =

1958 Turkish drama film directed by Metin Erksan

- Film poster
- Directed by: Metin Erksan
- Screenplay by: Metin Erksan
- Produced by: Özdemir Birsel
- Starring: Fikret Hakan, Serpil Gül, and Hayri Esen
- Cinematography: Sevket Kiymaz
- Edited by: Kenan Davutoglu (montage)
- Music by: Nedim Otyam
- Production company: Birsel Film
- Release date: 1958
- Running time: 107 minutes
- Country: Turkey
- Language: Turkish

Dokuz Dağın Efesi, or Dokuz Dağın Efesi: Çakici Geliyor is a 1958 Turkish drama film directed by Metin Erksan. It stars Fikret Hakan, Serpil Gül, and Hayri Esen.
