= Murder in Yolpalas =

- Film poster
- Directed by: Metin Erksan
- Screenplay by: Metin Erksan
- Based on: Yolpalas Cinayeti by Halide Edib Adıvar
- Produced by: Nazif Duru
- Starring: Uğur Başaran, Altan Karındaş, and Bülent Oran
- Cinematography: Fethi Mürenler
- Music by: Orhan Barlas
- Production company: Atlas Film
- Release date: 1955
- Country: Turkey
- Language: Turkish

Murder in Yolpalas (Turkish: Yolpalas Cinayeti) is a 1955 Turkish drama film directed by Metin Erksan, based on the novel by Halide Edib Adıvar. It stars Uğur Başaran, Altan Karındaş, and Bülent Oran.
