= Ölmüş Bir Kadının Evrakı Metrukesi =

- Film poster
- Directed by: Metin Erksan
- Screenplay by: Metin Erksan
- Based on: Ölmüs bir kadinin evraki metrukesi by Güzide Sabri
- Produced by: Nazif Duru
- Starring: Sezer Sezin, Kenan Artun, Altan Karındaş, Müfit Kiper, Temel Karamahmut, Cahit Irgat, Kani Kıpçak, Muzaffer Tema, Sadri Alışık, Ahmet Danyal Topatan, Cahide Sonku, Nevin Seval, Neşet Berküren and Mümtaz Ener
- Cinematography: Manasi Filmeridis
- Music by: Hulki Saner
- Production company: Türk Film
- Release date: 1956
- Country: Turkey
- Language: Turkish

Ölmüş Bir Kadının Evrakı Metrukesi (Dead Letter of a Deceased Woman) is a 1956 Turkish romantic drama film directed by Metin Erksan and Semih Evin, based on a novel by Güzide Sabri. It stars Sezer Sezin, Kenan Artun, and Altan Karındaş.
