= Kınar Sıvacıyan =

Turkish stage actress (1876–1950)

- Born: Kınar; 1876; Istanbul, Ottoman Empire
- Died: August 13, 1950 (aged 73–74); Istanbul, Turkey
- Occupation: Actress
- Years active: 1894–1930s

Kınar Sıvacıyan (1876 – 13 August 1950), best known as Kınar Hanım ("Lady Kınar"), was a Turkish stage actress of Armenian descent.

== Private life ==
Kınar Hanım was born in Istanbul, then Ottoman Empire, in 1876. She entered acting in her early age owing to her Armenian mother Bercuhi Hanım, who was a stage actress in the "Fasulyeciyan Theater Company".

During the six-year theater tour in the Balkans, she married Arşag Sıvacıyan, who was an actor and comedian of the same theater company. She gave birth to a son Yetvart. However, she lost her husband and son at a young age.

She died at her home in Kadıköy on 13 August 1950, and was buried in Kadıköy Armenian cemetery, Istanbul.

== Acting career ==
She debuted on the stage at the age of 14 encouraged by her mother. She performed the role for "Victor" in the play "Körün Oğlu" ("Son of a Blind") in Tekirdağ. In the following years, she played with the Fasulyeciyan Theater Company. At her age of 18, she became a regular member of the theater company. She toured six years long Balkans, which are today Bulgaria and Romania, with the theater company.

Returned home in 1901, she joined the "Mınakyan Theater Company". She was the promoted to the leading actress of the theater company. She became also an actress sought by many other theater companies, which were established in the liberal atmosphere of the Second Constitutional Era (1908–1919).

In 1912, she co-founded the "Yeni Osmanlı Tiyatrosu" ("New Ottoman Theater") in Kadıköy, Istanbul together with Aghavni Zabel Binemeciyan and Sırapyon Hekimyan, another members of the Mınakyan Theater Company. The theater closed down in 1915 following the death of Binemeciyan.

On 19 January 1916, she performed in the play Çürük Temel, an adaptation from the French play La Maison d'Argile by Émile Fabre (1869–1955). It was the gala event for the celebration of the opening of the theater section of Darülbedayi, the first Imperial conservatory in the Ottoman Empire established in 1914. The Darülbedayi in the Ottoman Empire became later Istanbul City Theatres in the Republican Era. Her notable roles were in the theater plays Dalida, Kantocu Kız, Ekmekçi Kadın, Fanfan and Gülnihal. She performed under the direction of Muhsin Ertuğrul, prominent actor and art director.

She unexpectedly retired from acting in the 1930s. According to rumors, her departure from the theater was due to the increasing number of Muslim Turkish women in the theater, who spoke Turkish language without accent contrary to non-Muslims. However, as remembered by her disciple actor Vasfi Rıza Zobu (1902–1992), she left the Istanbul City Theatres resentful. She was associated with notable theater figures of the era like Eliza Binemeciyan (1890–1981), Neyyire Neyir (1902–1943), Afife Jale (1902–1941), Muammer Karaca (1906–1978), Muhsin Ertuğrul (1892–1979), Hagop Ayvaz (1911–2006)and Bedia Muvahhit (1897–1994).

== Recognition ==
Muhsin Ertuğrul laudably referred to her as "the most competent actress of the Turkish theater in that era".

Turkish poet Ece Ayhan dedicated her poem "Kınar Hanım'ın Denizleri" ("The Seas of Kınar Hanım") to Kınar Hanım in her 1959 published book. She was portrayed in the 1979-film Afife Jale, the first Muslim Turkish stage actress.

== Performances ==
- Dalida (Marta)
- Kantocu Kız (Somine)
- Ekmekçi Kadın (Klaris)
- Simone ve Mari (Mari)
- Fanfan (Klodine)
- Gülnihal (Gülnihal)
- Huşenk (Münije)
- Alemdar (Cevri Kalfa)
- Çürük Temel (Pervin)
- Bir Çiçek İki Böcek (Servinaz Hanım)
- Kundak Takımları (Peyker)
- Yağmurdan Doluya (Müzeyyen)
- Kirli Çamaşırlar
- Kabus (Selma Hanım)
- Fare (İclal)
- Harap Yurt (Kevser)
- Karanlık Kuyu (Besime)
- Azarya (Avare)
- Dört – Çihar
- Odalık
- Kısmet Değilmiş
- Baykuş
