= Istanbul City Theatres =

Theater in Istanbul

- Istanbul Metropolitan Municipality City Theatres
- Formation: 1914; 112 years ago
- Founder: Cemil Topuzlu
- Founded at: Istanbul, Fatih
- Legal status: Active
- Purpose: Social inclusion
- Headquarters: Istanbul
- Location: Istanbul
- Region served: Turkey
- Official language: Turkish
- Website: sehirtiyatrolari.ibb.istanbul

Istanbul Metropolitan Municipality City Theatre (Turkish: Istanbul Büyükşehir Belediyesi Şehir Tiyatroları; Ottoman Turkish: Darülbedayi) The theater was founded in 1914 in the Ottoman Empire period as Dârülbedayi.It was a theater company connected to the Istanbul Metropolitan Municipality budget in the name of IMM City Theaters in 1934.

There are ten stages, Harbiye Muhsin Ertuğrul Stage, Kadıköy Haldun Taner Stage, Fatih Reşat Nuri Stage, Gaziosmanpaşa Stage, Gaziosmanpaşa Ferih Egemen Children Theater Stage, Üsküdar Müsahipzade Celal Stage, Üsküdar Kerem Yılmazer Stage, Kağıthane Sadabad Stage, Kağıthane Küçük Kemal Children Theater Stage and Ümraniye Stage.

The City Theater has an important place in the cultural life of Istanbul with the classical plays exhibited and the theater artists. In addition, with the stages has and the events and festivals it organizes are also an important mission. Examples of these activities include free panels where writers, poets and theater actors answer questions, and festivals such as the "International Istanbul Venue-Theater Festival".

== History ==
=== Foundation of Darülbedayi ===
==== 1910s ====
The founding story of Darülbedayi first started as a conservatory. In that period, Istanbul Mayor Cemil Topuzlu wanted to build a conservatory worthy of Istanbul. He offered the project to the parliament and it was accepted. Then, to start the project on 28 June 1914, important French theater man of the time André Antoine was invited and made an agreement for this project. He participated in the founding of Darülbedayi, and he has chosen students. He left Istanbul in the first world war.

Some of the first actors of Darülbedayi worked in various stages before installation (Behzat Butak, Nurettin Şefkati, Rıza Fadıl, Fikret Sadi, Ahmet Muvahhit, Muhsin Ertuğrul, Raşit Rıza, İ.Garip Arcan) (Hazım Körmükçü-1915, Vasfi Rıza Zobu-1917, Hüseyin Kemal Gürmen-1918). Some others (M. Kemal Küçük – 1920, Emin Beliğ Belli – 1920, Mahmut Moralı – 1923) theater studies began in various communities, and later involved in Darülbedayi. Upon the announcement for student candidacy, 197 people applied to Darülbedayi. 63of them was successful at first. Only eight Christians applied as women. So, finding a female actress has remained an important issue for a long time. The Muslim women's first taking part in Darülbedayi was in November 1918. They were young Turkish girls named Behire, Memduha, Beyza, Refika and Afife. The first actress to stage was Afife (1919, Hüseyin Suat Yalçın's "Yamalar" game). With the interest of Mustafa Kemal Atatürk, Turkish women took the place of Armenian women and after 1923, Bedia Muvahhit and Neyyire Neyir were taken to the stage life. After Antoine went, Reşad Rıdvan organized an opening ceremony (November 1914) not to be forgotten of Darülbedayi project. After a while, this art institution faced the danger of closing. At the time, Mayor Ismail Canbulat, requested a regulation. The work that started in November 1914 ended in January 1915. The first regulation prepared for Darülbedayi consists of thirty-seven substances. Darülbedayi was not only a school with this arrangement, but also a community that staged professional plays at the same time. The name "House of Beauty" came from Ali Ekrem Bolayır.

Darülbedayi started the stage life with Çürük Temel play, whom Hüseyin Suat had adapted from French writer Émile Fabre. The first plays have been staged at the wooden building in Tepebaşı, built by Rıdvan Paşa in 1890; Then the Ferah Theater and others in Şehzadebaşı were used.

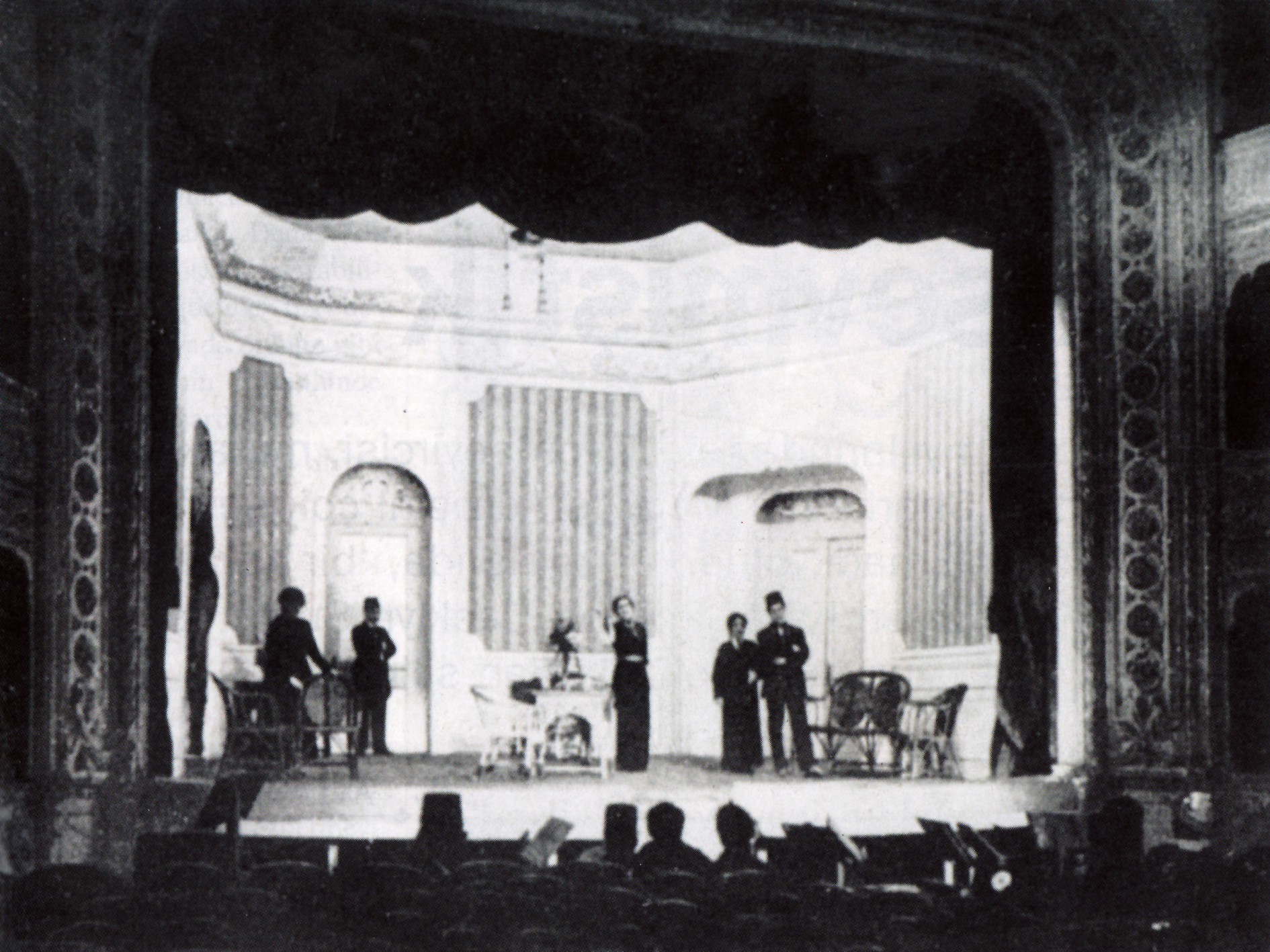
Premier representation of Darülbedayi was "Çürük Temel" at Tepebaşı Stage in 1916.

On Thursday, January 20, 1916, matinee performance was for women, soiree was for men. Shortly after this representation, Darülbedayi, who fell into trouble with money, closed the music section on 14 March 1916. In 1917, 3000 lira of aid was reduced to 1000 lira. In the meantime, Darülbedayi staged the first indigenous play "Baykuş" written by Halit Fahri Ozansoy (2 March 1917), and Muhsin Ertuğrul put on the stage this play which was approved by audiences. The second indigenous play was Yusuf Ziya Ortaç's "Binnaz" (1919). In the meantime, the school section, which was closed economic reasons, started to work again and moved to a house in Hamalbaşı (Beyoğlu) from Letafet Apartment in Şehzadebaşı.

==== 1920s ====
Despite the representations were in a regular situation starting from 1918, uneasiness in the institution increased. The second regulation, which was prepared by the mayor on March 31, 1920, was thirty-three clause, and by this regulation, Darülbedayi became a theater that only represents plays. On the dispute between the artists and the board, a significant part of the artists left and set up a special theater (New Stage). The work of this community did not last long, and when the founder Ismail Faik Bey went bankrupt, the community also disintegrated. Another private theater (Turkish theater) established in 1922 brought together artists from here and from Darülbedayi. These confusion lasted until 1923. Because of the poverty, irregularity, and impossibility, the representations of that year could only start in the spring of the season. On the other hand, the revenue office wanted taxes from the income of represented plays. After the proclamation of the Republic, it was decided in 1924 to prepare a proposal for Darülbedayi. Until the first regular season of 1927–28, artists worked in various communities. The most important ones are the National Stage communities, established by Muhsin Ertuğrul in Şehzadebaşı Ferah Sahnesi, founded by Raşit Rıza at the Aleppo Bazaar Variety Theater and organized by Fikret Şadi in Anatolian Tours.

Muhsin Ertuğrul was put to the head of Darülbedayi during the theater period of 1927–1928. The representatives became disciplined, organized and the play choices got better. The importance given to indigenous people increased; Five local artifacts were played during the period 1928–1929, and seven local artifacts were played during the period 1932–1933. In the following years, the number of Turkish plays staged increased continuously. The 59th clause of article 5 of the Municipal Code, which was adapted in the Turkish Grand National Assembly in 1930, gave the municipalities a "voluntary" duty to build a theater building and establish a theater society.

Thus, this institution was directly connected to the municipality. In 1924, the commission decided that Darülbedayi would be called "Istanbul City Theater". After being attached to the municipality, the institution was referred to in the name of City Theater by the press and public, but the institution received the name of City Theater in 1934.

=== From Darülbedayi to İstanbul City Theaters ===
==== 1930s ====
Having helped from the funding allocated to the charities of Istanbul Municipality, Darülbedayi first saw the close interest of the municipality during the governor Muhiddin Üstündağ in 1926; The management of the theater was given to Celal Esat Arseven. Muhsin Ertuğrul was chosen as the art director, who returned to his homeland after studying theater at Soviet Union. The artists are also started to be paid salary. In 1930 the theater was expected to receive a certain allowance from the municipal budget. In 1934, the institution officially began to be referred to as the Istanbul City Theater. It was also the years when City Theater's children's plays began to be regular and constantly staged. The practices of Ferih Egemen and Kemal Küçük in the field of Children's Theater, which was started in 1935, have historical characteristics in the name of national children's theater.

==== 1950s ====
In the beginning, Muhsin Ertuğrul, who was at the head of the theater, went on a campaign to increase the number of spectators and representatives for each play. The slogan was "increase from 3 times to 100 times" In 1926 "Hamlet" was represented at most 7 consecutive times; This number increased to 170 in 1959 with the same play scene. One of the reasons that accelerate this success is to play operettas, a new art scene in Tepebaşı Sahnesi. In the early years, the operettas written and composed by Ekrem Reşid Rey and Cemal Reşit Rey increased the interest and number of the spectators.

==== 1970s ====
In the season of 1971–1972, the number of spectators in five scenes of Istanbul City Theater was 310.000. And Average audience for the per play was 270. In 1935, the Istanbul City Theater performed in three different stages: drama and comedy in Tepebaşı Theater, operetta in French Theater, children's theater again in Tepebaşı at Asri Cinema. In those days, opening the Tepebaşı Theater with a Shakespeare play every season was becoming traditional. In addition to classics such as Molière, Goldoni, Schiller, as well as contemporary writers from Pirandello, Chekhov, Bernard Shaw, Dostoevsky, Tolstoy, Ibsen, Gorky, many works of the western world were being publicly displayed.

After a while, operettas and musical works were put to an end; Their place was lightly comedies and vaudevilles. In 1952, Max Meinecke was brought from Austria to direct the art works. In these years, plays were also staged at the Eminönü Public Hall in Istanbul. In 1959, Muhsin Ertuğrul was brought back to the foundation and the new working period lasted until 1966. Muhsin Ertuğrul opened Kadıköy, Üsküdar, Fatih and Zeytinburnu theater stages in order to take bring the theater to the people. Fatih (Reşat Nuri) Theater [1960] at the beginning of Saraçhane and Üsküdar (Müsahipzade Celal) Theater [1961] at Doğancılar district have been continuing represents until today; Zeytinburnu representatives were given up after a few seasons. İpek Cinema in Beyoğlu started to work under the direction of City Theater in the name of New Comedy Theater. The Kadıköy Theater was also replaced and settled in the large hall of the Public Education Center. The Tepebaşı Theater, which has a historical value, had been closed to representations shortly before burning (1970) because it could not carry the burden of spectators due to it was wore off. On top of that, a large theater was built in a pavilion built during the Istanbul exhibition in Harbiye and the administration part moved here (1970).

Reşat Nuri Güntekin's Yaprak Dökümü play, which was played in the 1943–44 season, was the first domestic play to reach 100 representations. In the 1945–46 season, Edmond Rostand's Cyrano de Bergerac was the first translation play to reach 105 representations.

Darülbedayi, which is called as Istanbul City Theater in the present, has launched the tradition of theater magazines in the country. The City Theater, which published 25 episodes of the theater magazine "Temaşa" between 1918 and 1920, is one of the longest theatrical magazines in the world and has been publishing in the name of "Darülbedayi", "Turkish Theater" and "City Theater" since 1930 until today.

Taking into consideration the change and audience orientation of the Turkish theater in recent years, the City Theaters opens its curtains to the Istanbul audience and the theater lovers in other cities with a large repertoire of local and foreign writers. In addition, by inviting foreign directors and theater men, they bring the plays and put on the stage for the Turkish audience.

The first work of many playwrights was staged at City Theaters for the first time and the new playwrights were brought in to the Turkish Theater.

==== 2000s ====
The City Theaters, which has the ten stage of today (2017), opens the curtains for the around 2000 audience every day in Istanbul.

The "City Theater", which continues its art works and plays as an attached budget directorate attached to the İstanbul Metropolitan Municipality, has been taken to the General Budget since 1 January 2006.

Some of the valuable theatricians who have undertaken the duty of General Art Director of Istanbul City Theater since its establishment are: Muhsin Ertuğrul, Vasfi Rıza Zobu, Gencay Gürün, Erol Keskin, Kenan Işık, Şükrü Türen, Nurullah Tuncer, Mazlum Kiper, Orhan Alkaya, Ayşenil Şamlıoğlu.

Finally, Erhan Yazıcıoğlu was appointed as General Art Director of City Theater in 2014.

== Theater stages ==
City Theaters', stages spread over Istanbul, with the low price application allows city people to watch the theater plays.

The total capacity of the City Theaters reached 2,751 with the 214-seat "Üsküdar Kerem Yılmazer Stage" opened in October 2006 and the "Kağıhane Sadabad Stage" with a 601-seat capacity. In addition, Cemil Topuzlu Open-Air Theatre with 3.996 seats serves national and international events during the summer season. Apart from these, the Old Galata Bridge was also transferred to the City Theaters. National and international events are being held here with the participation of 5 thousand spectators. Also in 2008, the Harbiye Muhsin Ertuğrul Stage was demolished to be rebuilt and in 2010 the gates of the new building were opened again to the audience.

Istanbul City Theater's Stages are:

- Kadıköy Haldun Taner Stage
- Harbiye Muhsin Ertuğrul Stage
- Gaziosmanpaşa Ferih Egemen Children's Theater Stage
- Gaziosmanpaşa Stage
- Fatih Reşat Nuri Stage
- Kağıthane Sadabad Stage
- Kağıthane Kemal Küçük Children's Theater Stage
- Üsküdar Kerem Yılmazer Stage
- Üsküdar Musahipzade Celal Stage
- Ümraniye Stage

== Other sources ==
- "Şehir Tiyatroları - Şehir Tiyatroları - İBB". Ibb.gov.tr. Archived from the original on 24 September 2015.
- Merkezi, Türkiye Diyanet Vakfı İslam Araştırmaları. "İslâm Ansiklopedisi". Tdvia.org.

== Bibliography ==
- The Turkish Muse: Views & Reviews, 1960s-1990s, ISBN 9780815630685
