= İsmet Ay =

Turkish actor

- Born: 28 December 1924; Şile, Turkey
- Died: 7 October 2004 (aged 79); Istanbul, Turkey
- Occupation: Actor
- Years active: 1948–2004

İsmet Ay (28 December 1924 – 7 October 2004) was a Turkish actor.

Ay graduated from the Istanbul Municipal Conservatory Theater Department. He joined the City Theatres in 1948 and started his acting career there. After working at the City Theaters for a long period of time, he started to appear in movies. He worked for the City Theaters for 32 years before retiring in 1980. He gained acclaim for his role as "Sermet" in the Süper Baba series. Meanwhile, he continued his career on stage as a guest artist in the theatre founded by Tolga Aşkıner and Ali Poyrazoğlu. Towards the end of his life, the actor starred in the TV series Cennet Mahallesi even though he was suffering from poor health. Ay died in 2004 and was buried in Şile.

== Awards ==
- 4th Ankara Film Festival, 1992, Best Supporting Actor - Seni Seviyorum Rosa
- Avni Dilligil Theatre Award, 1987, Best Actor - The Cherry Orchard
- Ministry of Culture, 1988, Best Actor

== Theatre ==
- Tartuffe : Molière - Istanbul City Theatres - 1992
- The Birds : Aristophanes - Istanbul City Theatres - 1989
- The Cherry Orchard : Anton Chekhov - Istanbul City Theatres - 1987
- The Liar : Carlo Goldoni - Istanbul City Theatres - 1969
- Bozuk Düzen : Güner Sümer - Ankara Art Theatre - 1965

== Filmography ==
- Abdülhamit Düşerken - 2002
- Benimle Evlenir misin - 2001
- Kara Kentin Çocukları - 1999
- Kaçıklık Diploması - 1998
- Cumhuriyet - 1998
- Baba Evi- 1997
- Tatlı Kaçıklar - 1996
- İz - 1994
- Süper Baba - 1993
- Seni Seviyorum - 1992
- Hiçbir Gece - 1989
- Afife Jale - 1987
- Hoşgeldin Ramazan - 1987
- Asılacak Kadın - 1986
- Kaşık Düşmanı - 1984
- Renkli Dünya - 1980
- Talihli Amele - 1980
- Bir Yürek Satıldı - 1977
- Özgürlüğün Bedeli - 1977
- Fatoş Talihsiz Yavru - 1970
- Kalbimin Sahibi - 1969
- Acı İle Karışık - 1969
- İnleyen Nağmeler - 1969
- Bozuk Düzen - 1965
- Tatlı Günah - 1961
- Aslan Yavrusu - 1960
- Can Yoldaşı - 1952
