= Afife Jale =

Turkish actress (1902–1941)

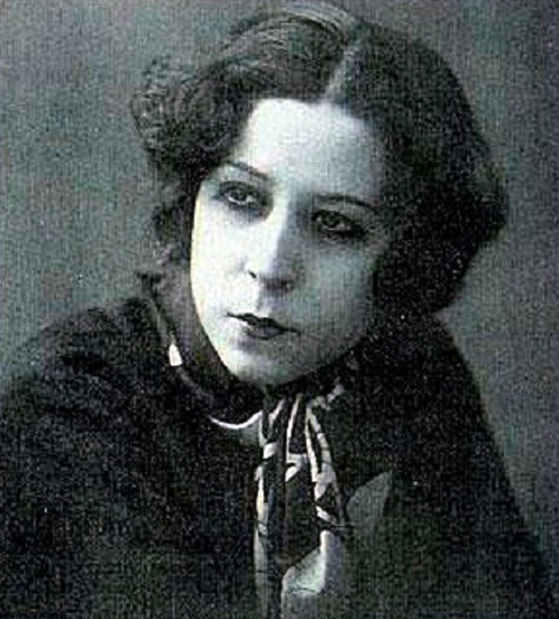
- Born: 1902; Istanbul, Ottoman Empire
- Died: July 24, 1941 (aged 38–39); Istanbul, Turkey
- Occupation: Stage actress
- Years active: 1918-1941
- Spouse: Selahattin Pınar (m. 1929–1935)

Afife Jale (1902 – July 24, 1941) was a Turkish stage actress, best known as the first Muslim theatre actress in the Ottoman Empire.

== Early life ==
Jale was born in Kadıköy, Istanbul to father Hidayet and mother Medhiye. She had two half-siblings, sister Behiye and brother Salah, on her mother's side. Though she was interested in acting from a young age, her father was opposed to her becoming an actress on religious grounds; the profession was unheard of for a woman in a middle-class Muslim family.

At this time, Muslim women in general were discouraged from attending or participating in plays. Actresses in the Ottoman Empire were generally from non-Muslim minorities, and theatre audiences were subject to Islamic sex segregation. It was common for productions to run twice a day: first for women in the morning, and again for men in the evening. Nonetheless, a growing number of artists were beginning to advocate for the inclusion of women on the stage, such as Muhsin Ertuğrul.

=== Name ===
Jale's legal name was Afife; she did not use a family name, as hereditary surnames were not compulsory in Turkey until 1934. She adopted the name "Jale" as a stage name, and subsequently came to be known to the Turkish public as Afife Jale.

== Education ==
In 1914, the Ottoman Empire established its first imperial state conservatory, the Dârülbedâyi, to provide an education in music and theatre to male students. French theatre manager André Antoine was initially appointed to run the institution, as it was hoped that the conservatory would begin a national theatre tradition. In 1918, the school made the decision to admit Turkish Muslim women to study theatre, with the understanding that productions by these women would be for audiences of women only.

Jale, while still a at Istanbul's Girls' Industrial School, undertook the Darülbedayi's entrance exam on November 10, 1918. She became one of five girls accepted there, but she would be the only one to continue acting studies beyond one year. Three girls discontinued their studies due to the strength of cultural opposition to women on the stage, coupled with the Darülbedayi's reluctance to let them perform. Jale's fourth classmate, Refika, decided to become a prompter instead, becoming the first Turkish Muslim woman to pursue a profession behind the curtain in theatre.

== Acting career ==
In April 1920, when Armenian actress Eliza Binemeciyan left the Dârülbedâyi prior to the premiere of the play Yamalar ("Patches") by Hüseyin Suat, the institution's managers offered the role to Jale. She accepted, and made her stage debut on April 22 at the Apollon Theatre. Although Jale was not the first Turkish woman record as having appeared on stage, she was the first to perform in a modern Turkish theatre with a prompter. Playwright Suat approached her after the play to congratulate her, saying: "Our stage needed a devotee to art. You are that devotee." Reflecting on the performance six years later, Jale described the performance as "the first time [she] was happy in [her] life."

Police attended the aftermath of the performance to advise the Dârülbedâyi against permitting Muslim actresses on stage again. Despite this warning, Jale performed in her second production, Tatlı Sır ("Sweet Secret"), a week later. Police attended to detain her, but she was able to escape with the assistance of actress Kınar Hanım. Jale's attempt to participate in a third play soon after, Odalık ("Handmaiden"), did result in arrest. She was interrogated and accused of indecency, violating Islamic customs, and treason. Her release was secured when the Dârülbedâyi's best-known actors petitioned Tahsin, the local director of police. Tahsin was more tolerant than his officers, and ordered his officers to leave her undisturbed.

Nonetheless, in February and March of 1921, the Ministry of the Interior issued two orders: the first prohibiting Muslim woman from the stage in any fashion, and a second specifically ordering the Dârülbedâyi to fire Jale. Fearing further repercussions, the institution did not defend Jale further; she was removed on 8 March. She continued acting as part of actor Burhanettin Tepsi's troupe, touring Anatolia and working under various stage names, of which one was 'Marika.'

The Ottoman Sultanate was abolished in late 1922. The state began to transition into the Republic of Turkey, and the imperial ban on acting by Muslim women was lifted by the state's new leader, Mustafa Kemal Atatürk. Two months after the proclamation of the Turkish republic, Turkish film actresses Bedia Muvahhit and Neyyire Neyir participated in a production of Othello, directed by Muhsin Ertuğrul, in Beyoğlu.

Despite the reversal in policy, and greater visibility of women on the stage, Jale was not invited back to perform at the Dârülbedâyi. By this time, all of her relatives, except her mother, had abandoned her; her mother's decision to support Jale had resulted in the divorce of Jale's parents. Jale began to suffer from declining physical and mental health, and though she continued to perform intermittently, she entered financial difficulties that would last the rest of her life. She was prescribed morphine for migraines and subsequently developed an addiction she would struggle with until her death.

== Personal life ==
In 1929, Jale met and married musician Selahattin Pınar, who played the oud to accompany her performances. Jale's siblings believed this union had restored her honour, and communication between them recommenced.

The marriage ended in divorce in 1935 after a long separation, owing to Jale's ongoing troubles with morphine addiction. Pınar composed at least three songs on their relationship: Nereden Sevdim O Zalim Kadını ("Why did I fall in love with that cruel woman?"), Anladım Sevmeyeceksin Beni Sen Nazlı Çiçek ("I understand you won't love me, sweet flower") and Huysuz ve Tatlı Kadın ("That difficult yet sweet woman").

== Later life and death ==
Jale's mental health worsened in the final years of her life, as did her addiction. At times, she lived on the streets. She died destitute in Bakırköy Psychiatric Hospital on July 24, 1941.

=== Mystery of Jale's grave ===
Jale was buried in Kazlıçeşme Cemetery in the Kazlıçeşme district of Istanbul, though the approximate location of her grave was lost for many years. In 2023, 82 years after her death, actor and theatre historian Boğos Çalgıcıoğlu identified the cemetery by extrapolating its location from a photograph taken at Jale's funeral. Çalgıcıoğlu was aided in his investigation by Haldun Dormen. Though the exact location of Jale's grave remains uncertain, the investigation concluded that she is interred in the pauper's section of the cemetery.

== Legacy ==
Since 1997, Yapı Kredi has organised the annual Afife Theatre Awards, described by the New Yorker as "among the highest honors in Turkish theatre."

In 1998, the Ortaköy Cultural Centre opened with an attached stage, named the Afife Jale Theatre.

=== Reappraisal and discussion ===
Though Yale's name has become synonymous with prestigious acting awards in modern Turkey, Jale herself received little recognition both during her lifetime and for decades after her death. In a 1977 article, actor Özdemir Nutku questioned why Jale had not been rehired by the Dârülbedâyi after the Ottoman Sultanate ended: "[If] the first Turkish actress in the history of our theatre [was] so talented, why was she not called back to the Dârülbedâyi? Nobody mentions this in their memoirs... Now this is an important question that's left in the dark."

Fahriye Dinçer argued in 2017 that Jale was largely ignored in her lifetime because she did not meet a particular image of femininity embodied by most actresses in the early Republic. Jale's contemporaries, such as Bedia Muvahhit, were marketed not only as performers, but as respectable wives and mothers. By placing acting above traditional pursuits, Jale was not a conventional enough star. Dinçer's view was echoed by Elif Baş İyibozkurt in 2025; furthermore, Jale lacked the legitimacy afforded to Muvahhit by the latter's connections to the state. In an opposing assessment, academic Ayşın Candan opined in 2024 that Jale has been "wrongly exalted" as a pioneer, having made her presence felt "for a very short time" before vanishing "under the snare of drugs."

== In media ==
=== In film ===
- Jale was portrayed by Müjde Ar twice: first in the film Afife Jale (1987), and again in Kilit (2008).
- In 2004, journalist Can Dündar presented a documentary of Jale's life and marriage entitled Yüzyılın aşkları: Afife ve Selahattin ("Love stories of the century: Afife and Selahattin").
- Serenay Sarıkaya portrays Jale in the series Fi (2017–2018).

=== On stage ===
- Journalist Nezihe Araz depicted Jale's life in a play bearing her name in 1988; the play was published in English in 1993.
- Jale's life is also depicted in the ballet Afife, composed by Turgay Erdener and choreographed by Beyhan Murphy.

=== Music ===
- A recording of the score from Erdener's ballet, Afife, was released in 2000, featuring soprano Selva Erdener, accompanied by Tchaikovsky Symphony Orchestra of Moscow Radio.
