= Ferdi Statzer =

Pianist, pedagogue, conductor and composer

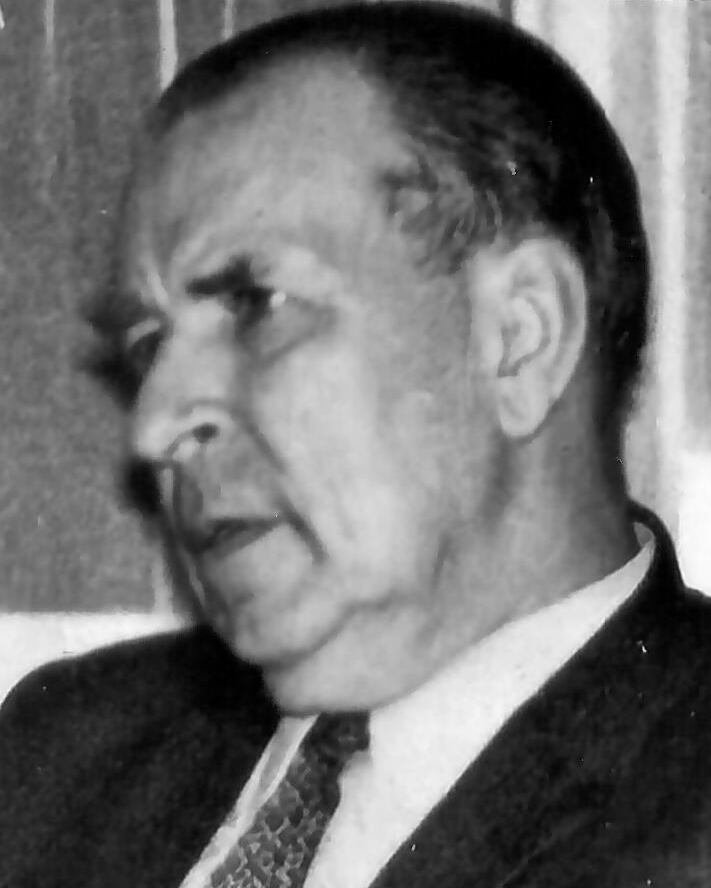
- Born: Friedrich von Statzer; 1906; Vienna, Austria
- Died: 17 June 1974 (aged 67–68)
- Resting place: Istanbul, Turkey
- Education: Classical music
- Alma mater: Mozarteum University of Salzburg; University of Music and Performing Arts, Vienna
- Occupations: Music teacher, composer, conductor, classical pianist
- Spouses: Bedia Muvahhit; Lilly Szekely
- Awards: Honorary Prof. (1972), Austrian State

Ferdi Statzer (né Friedrich von Statzer; 1906 – 17 June 1974) was an eminent Austrian pedagogue, pianist, conductor and composer. A native Viennese, his musical career transplanted him to Turkey, where he became an influential teacher to a generation of pianists.

== Early life ==
Statzer was born in Vienna, Austria in 1906, to a father of Hungarian-Polish origin and a mother of Austrian descent. Following initial piano lessons with his mother, Statzer entered Mozarteum University of Salzburg, where his teachers included Emil von Sauer and Friedrich Wührer.

After graduating in 1925, Statzer continued his music education at the University of Music and Performing Arts, Vienna, where he studied composition with Joseph Marx.

== Career in Turkey ==
In 1932, Statzer met Turkish composer Hasan Ferit Alnar, who invited him to Turkey. Through the good offices of Alnar, Statzer joined the Istanbul Municipal Conservatory (now Istanbul University State Conservatory) as a faculty member and was employed by the İstanbul Şehir Tiyatroları (Istanbul State Theaters) as a composer and a pianist.

Statzer taught for many years at the Conservatory, establishing a distinct and influential school of pianism. Some of his pupils went on to successful concert or other significant music careers; these include Mehmet Kurdoğlu, Şahan Arzruni, Ali Darmar, Verda Erman, Betin Güneş, Meral Güneyman, Sirvart Kalpakyan Karamanuk, Arın Karamürsel, Ayşegül Sarıca, Ergican Saydam and Gülay Uğurata., Janet Mafyan (mother of Alain Altinoglu)

In 1972, the Austrian government bestowed Statzer with the honorary title of "Professor".

== Personal life ==
In 1933, Statzer married the Turkish actress Bedia Muvahhit. Following their divorce, he married again in 1952, this time to Hungarian violinist Lilly Szekely, leader of the then touring women's music ensemble "Pogány".

In 1944, Statzer became a Turkish citizen, and later converted to Islam.

== Death ==
Statzer died of a heart attack on 17 June 1974 while driving in Europe. His funeral took place on 2 July 1974 at the Teşvikiye Mosque in Istanbul, Turkey.
