= Halide (disambiguation) =

A halide is a chemical compound containing a halogen atom.

Halide may also refer to:

- Halide minerals, a group of minerals which contain halogens
- Halide (name), a feminine Turkish given name
- Halide (programming language), a computer programming language

== See also ==
- Organic halide
