= Saydam =

Saydam is a Turkish surname. Notable people with the surname include:

- Ergican Saydam (1929–2009), Turkish pianist
- Nejat Saydam (1929–2000), Turkish film director, screenwriter, and actor
- Refik Saydam (1881–1942), Prime Minister of Turkey
