= Halide Pişkin =

Turkish actress

- Born: 15 July 1902; Shkodër, Ottoman Empire
- Died: 1 November 1959 (aged 57); Istanbul, Turkey
- Occupations: Stage, radio and movie actress
- Years active: 1923 – 1959

Halide Pişkin (15 July 1902 – 1 November 1959) was a Turkish stage, radio and movie actress. She is considered as the first theatre actress of the Republican era.

== Early life and background ==
Halide was born on in Shkodër, then in the Ottoman Empire, on 15 July 1902. After education at Bezmialem Valide Sultanisi in Istanbul, she was appointed teacher at Feyzi Hürriyet School in Üsküdar.

== Career ==
In 1923, she debuted in the play Seva Hanım Zevcem ("My Spouse Miss Sevda") staged in İzmir at the "Milli Sahne" ("National Stage") established by Şadi Fikret. After the theatre company fell apart, she joined the Darülbedayi in Istanbul in 1925, and worked later with theatre companies of Raşit Rıza, Naşit Özcan and Sadi Tek. In 1943, she co-founded with İhsan Balkır their own theatre company. Finally, she entered the Istanbul City Theatres, where she performed until her death with the exception of some years.

She became well-known as "Pişkin Teyze" ("Sophisticated Aunt") in radio dramas she performed in addition to her acting on stage. She entered film world in 1933 with her performance in the movie Karım Beni Aldatırsa ("If My Wife Cheats On Me"). Later, she acted in the movies Aynaroz Kadısı (1938), Allah'ın Cenneti (1939), Tuzak (1948), Lüküs Hayat (1950), İncili Çavuş (1951), Kızımın Başına Gelenler (1958) and Kalpaklılar (1959). In 1958, she wrote the screenplay Kızımın Başına Gelenler ("What Happened to My Daughter").

== Death ==
Pişkin died at the age of 57 in Istanbul due to kidney failure on 1 November 1959.

== References and notes ==
- While some sources state her birth year as 1906, 1907 and 1910, in an interview at Milliyet on 28 Nov 1954, pg. 3, she states that she's born in 1320 Hijri, which is 1902. This seems consistent with her interviews on 1930s.
