= International Organization of Turkic Culture =

International cultural organization

International Organization of Turkic Culture Uluslararası Türk Kültürü Teşkilatı Международная организация тюркской культуры
- Flag

- Sovereign (green) and other members (cyan) of Türksoy
- Headquarters: Ankara, Turkey
- Working languages: English; Russian; Turkish
- Members: 6 member states; 8 observer states

Leaders
  - General Secretary: Sultan Raev
- Establishment: 1993
- Website www.turksoy.org

The International Organization of Turkic Culture (Note: Russian: Международная организация тюркской культуры, romanized: Mezhdunarodnaya organizatsiya tyurkskoy kul'tury Turkish: Uluslararası Türk Kültürü Teşkilatı) or TÜRKSOY is an international cultural organization of countries with Turkic populations, speaking languages belonging to the Turkic language family.

The General Secretary of Türksoy is Sultan Raev, the former Minister of Culture of Kyrgyzstan and deputy General Secretary of Organization of Turkic States. Türksoy has its headquarters in Ankara, Turkey.

== Name ==
TÜRKSOY was initially established as the Common Administration of Turkic Culture and Arts (Turkish: Türk Kültür ve Sanatları Ortak Yönetimi), and was later on renamed as International Organization of Turkic Culture. Its acronym nevertheless remained the same.

== History ==
The organization has its roots in meetings during 1992 in Baku and Istanbul, where the ministers of culture from Azerbaijan, Kazakhstan, Kyrgyzstan, Uzbekistan, Turkey, and Turkmenistan declared their commitment to cooperate in a joint cultural framework. Türksoy was subsequently established by an agreement signed on 12 July 1993 in Almaty.

In 1996, an official cooperation between Türksoy and UNESCO was established, involving mutual consultations and reciprocal representation.

Since its establishment, the Turkic Council has acted as an umbrella organization for Türksoy and a number of related organizations.

== Member and observer states ==
As of 2022, Türksoy has six founding and eight observer members.

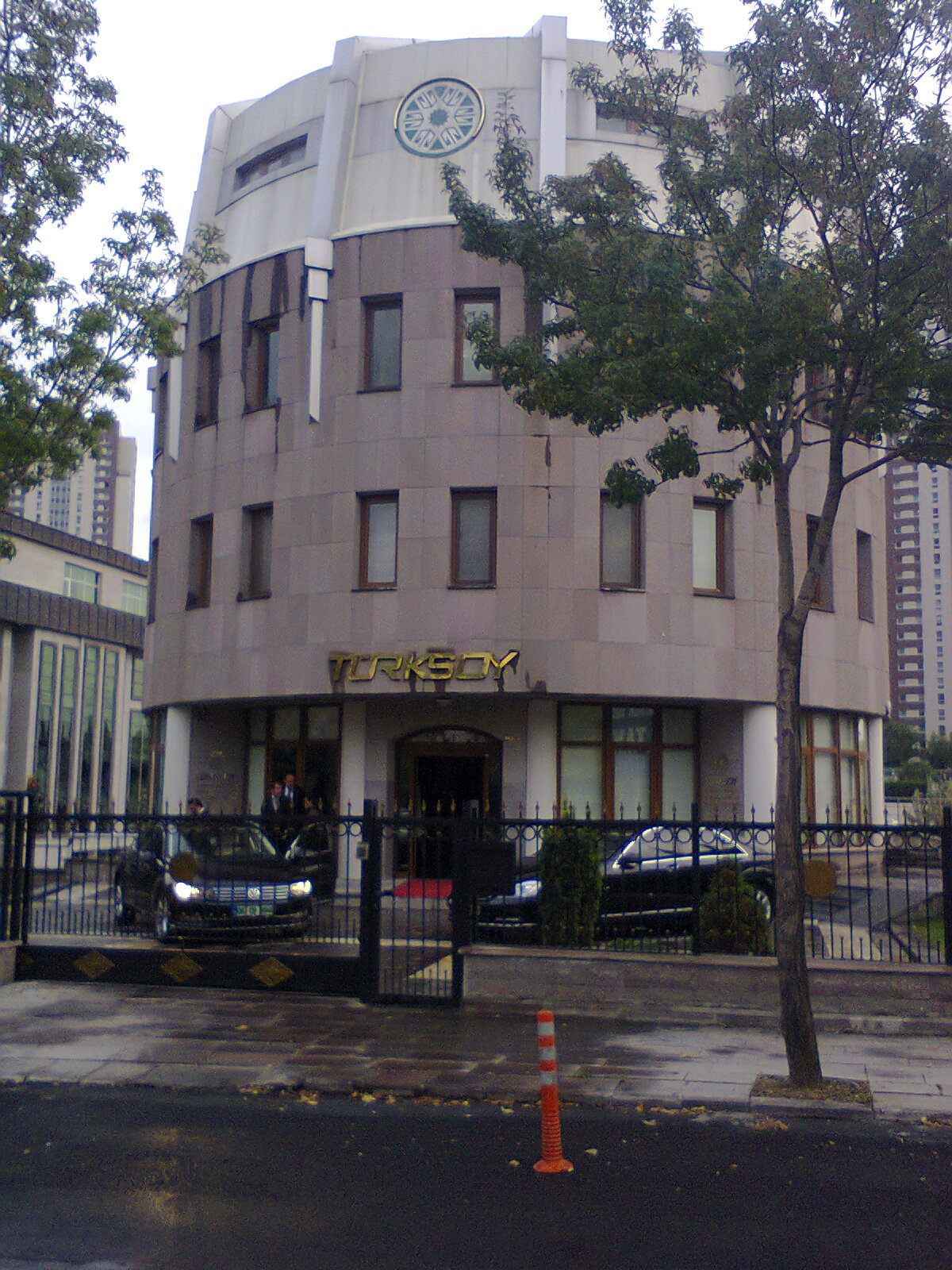
Türksoy Headquarters, Ankara

=== Members ===
Member state	Official language(s)	Accession date	Area (km^{2})	Demographics
Azerbaijan	Azerbaijani	1993	86,600	91% Azerbaijanis, 3% Lezgins, 2% Russians, 1,5% Armenians, and others
Kazakhstan	Kazakh, Russian	1993	2,724,900	71,5% Kazakhs, 14,4% Russians, and others
Kyrgyzstan	Kyrgyz, Russian	1993	199,951	77% Kyrgyz, 15% Uzbeks, 5% Russians, and others
Turkey	Turkish	1993	783,562	70–75% Turks, 19% Kurds and 6–11% others
Turkmenistan	Turkmen	1993	488,100	85% Turkmens, 5% Uzbeks, 4% Russians, and others
Uzbekistan	Uzbek	1993	448,924	80% Uzbeks, 5% Russians, 5% Tajiks, and others

=== Observers ===
Observer state	Official language(s)	Accession date	Area (km^{2})	Demographics
Bashkortostan (Russian Federation)	Bashkir, Russian	1993	143,600	29% Bashkirs, 36% Russians, 24% Tatars, and others
Northern Cyprus (de facto)	Turkish	1993	3,335	98% Turks, 0,5% Greeks, and others
Tatarstan (Russian Federation)	Tatar, Russian	1993	67,836	52% Tatars, 39% Russians, and others
Khakassia (Russian Federation)	Khakas, Russian	1996	61,900	13% Khakas, 79% Russians, and others
Tuva (Russian Federation)	Tuvan, Russian	1996	170,500	64% Tuvans, 32% Russians, and others
Găgăuzia (Moldova)	Gagauz, Romanian, Russian	1999	1,832	82% Gagauz, 7,8% Moldovans, 4,9% Bulgarians, and others
Altai (Russian Federation)	Altay, Russian	2003	206,168	31% Altaians, 61,4% Russians, Kazakhs and others
Yakutia (Russian Federation)	Yakut, Russian	2003	3,062,100	40% Yakuts, 60% Russians, Tatars and others

== Activities ==
Since its establishment, Türksoy has been "carrying out activities to strengthen the ties of brotherhood and solidarity among Turkic peoples, transmit the common Turkic culture to future generations and introduce it to the world."

Activities and events include:

- Gatherings of artists, photographers, painters, opera singers, poets, journalists, theatre, dance and music ensembles of the Turkic World
- Monthly journal published in three languages
- Publishing works written in various Turkic languages and dialects
- Commemoration of artists, authors, poets and scholars in recognition of their valuable contribution to Turkic culture
- Symposia and conferences covering topics on the common history, language, culture and art of Turkic peoples
- Nevruz Day celebrations including concerts and events held in the UNESCO Headquarters in 2010, the United Nations General Assembly Hall in 2011, and various other countries including Germany, Austria, and the United Kingdom.

=== Cultural Capital of the Turkic World ===
Every year, Türksoy selects one city in the Turkic world to be the "Cultural Capital of the Turkic World". The chosen city hosts a number of events to celebrate Turkic culture.

The cities that have been awarded this title are:

- 2012: Astana, Kazakhstan
- 2013: Eskişehir, Turkey
- 2014: Kazan, Tatarstan
- 2015: Merv, Turkmenistan
- 2016: Shaki, Azerbaijan
- 2017: Turkistan, Kazakhstan
- 2018: Kastamonu, Turkey
- 2019: Osh, Kyrgyzstan
- 2020: Khiva, Uzbekistan
- 2022: Bursa, Turkey
- 2023: Shusha, Azerbaijan
- 2024: Anau, Turkmenistan
- 2025: Aktau, Kazakhstan

=== Commemorative years ===
Since 2010, Türksoy has selected at least one figure from Turkic culture every year to dedicate their activities to.

Year	Person	Description
2010	Zeki Velidi Togan	Bashkir historian, 120th anniversary of his birth
2011	Ğabdulla Tuqay	Tatar poet, 125th anniversary of his birth
2012	Nikolai Katanov	Khakas Turkologist, 150th anniversary of his birth
2012	Mirza Fatali Akhundov	Azerbaijani writer, 200th anniversary of his birth
2013	Mukan Tulebaev	Kazakh musician, 100th anniversary of his birth
2014	Magtymguly Pyragy	Turkmen poet
2014	Toktogul Satylganov	Kyrgyz poet
2015	Haldun Taner	Turkish writer, 100th anniversary of his birth
2015	Semyon Kadyshev	Khakas dastan writer, 130th anniversary of his birth
2016	Yūsuf Balasaguni	Turkic philosopher and poet, 1000th anniversary of his birth
2017	Molla Panah Vagif	Azerbaijani poet, 300th anniversary of his birth
2018	Gara Garayev	Azerbaijani composer, 100th anniversary of his birth
2018	Magzhan Zhumabayev	Kazakh poet, 125th anniversary of his birth
2018	Chinghiz Aitmatov	Kyrgyz writer, 90th anniversary of his birth
2019	Imadaddin Nasimi	Azerbaijani poet, 650th anniversary of his birth
2019	Âşık Veysel	Turkish folk singer, 125th anniversary of his birth
2020	Abai Qunanbaiuly	Kazakh poet and intellectual, 175th anniversary of his birth
2021	Yunus Emre	Turkish Sufi and poet, 700th anniversary of his death
2021	Nizami Ganjavi	Persian poet, 880th anniversary of his birth
2022	Toktobolot Abdumomunov	Kyrgyz writer, 100th anniversary of his birth
2022	Fikret Amirov	Azerbaijani composer, 100th anniversary of his birth
2022	Süleyman Çelebi	Turkish sufi, 600th anniversary of his death
2023	Temirbek Jürgenov	Kazakh poet, 125th anniversary of his birth
2023	Baken Kydykeyeva	Kyrgyz actress, 100th anniversary of her birth
2023	Mehmet Akif Ersoy	Turkish poet, 150th anniversary of his birth
2023	Al-Biruni	Persian scientist born in modern-day Uzbekistan, 1050th anniversary of his birth
2023	İsmet Güney	Northern Cypriot painter, 100th anniversary of his birth
2024	Magtymguly Pyragy	Turkmen poet and philosopher, 300th anniversary of his birth (2nd commemoration)
2025	Bakhtiyar Vahabzadeh	Azerbaijani poet, 100th anniversary of his birth
2025	Nurgisa Atabayoğlu Tilendiyev	Kazakh conductor and composer, 100th anniversary of his birth
2025	Atai Ogonbaev	Kyrgyz composer, 125th anniversary of his birth
2025	Münir Nurettin Selçuk	Turkish composer, 125th anniversary of his birth
2025	Aşık Kenzi	Northern Cypriot folk singer, 230th anniversary of his birth
2026	Ziya Gökalp	Turkish writer, 150th anniversary of his birth

== Funding ==
Türksoy is funded by contributions paid by individual member states, local governments, universities and NGOs.

== Related organizations ==
The Organization of Turkic States, the Turkic Academy and the Foundation of Turkic Culture and Heritage are organizations which TÜRKSOY works in coordination with. TÜRKSOY also carries out cooperation activities with the UNESCO, the ISESCO and the International Foundation for the Humanitarian Cooperation (IFESCCO) of the Commonwealth of Independent States.

As part of the XV International Tashkent Film Festival "Pearl of the Silk Road", the "World Turkic Filmmakers Forum" was held, at which it was decided to create the Union of Cinematographers of the Turkic World. The head of the Cinematography Agency of the Ministry of Culture of Uzbekistan, Firdavs Abdukhalikov, was elected the chairman of the organization.

== List of secretaries-general ==
No.	Name	Country of origin	Took office	Left office
1	Polad Bülbüloğlu	Azerbaijan	1994	2008
2	Düsen Kaseinov	Kazakhstan	29 May 2008	31 March 2022
3	Sultan Raev	Kyrgyzstan	31 March 2022	incumbent

== Leaders of member states ==
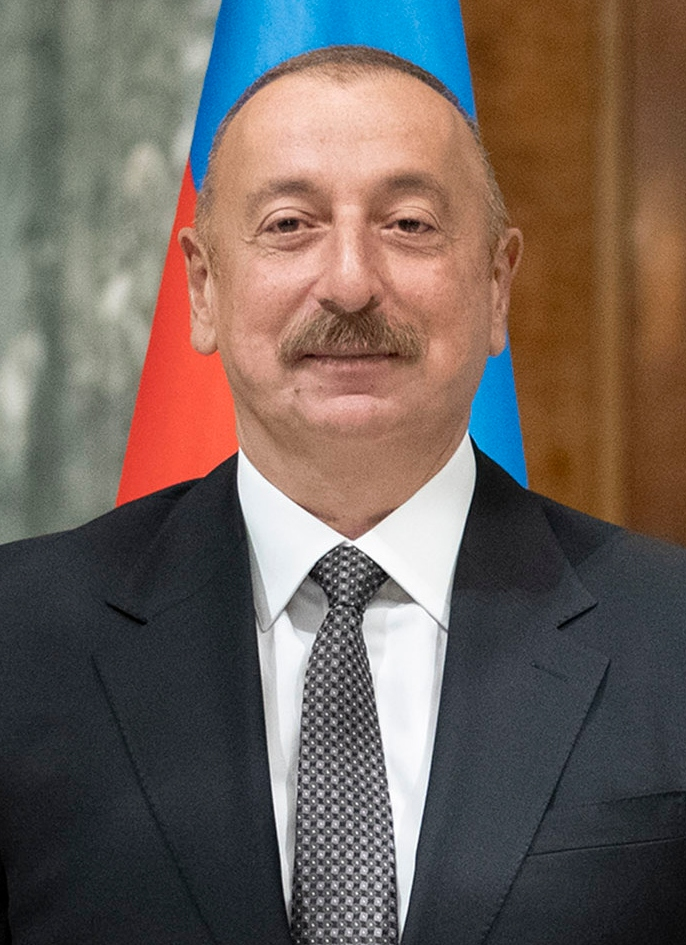
Republic of Azerbaijan
Ilham Aliyev
President of Azerbaijan

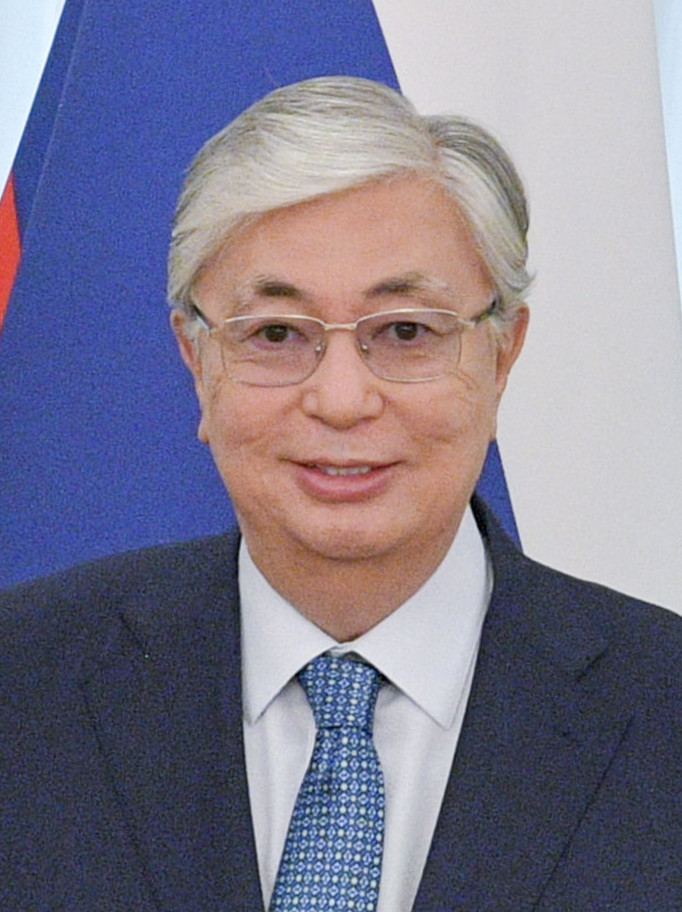
Republic of Kazakhstan
Kassym-Jomart Tokayev
President of Kazakhstan

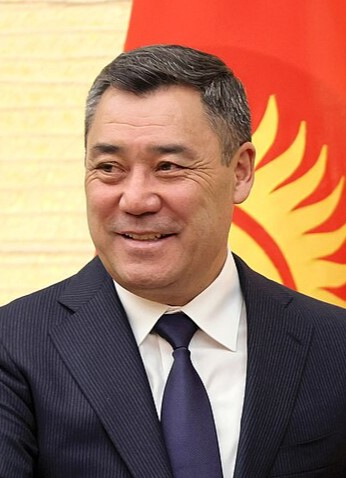
Kyrgyz Republic
Sadyr Japarov
President of Kyrgyzstan

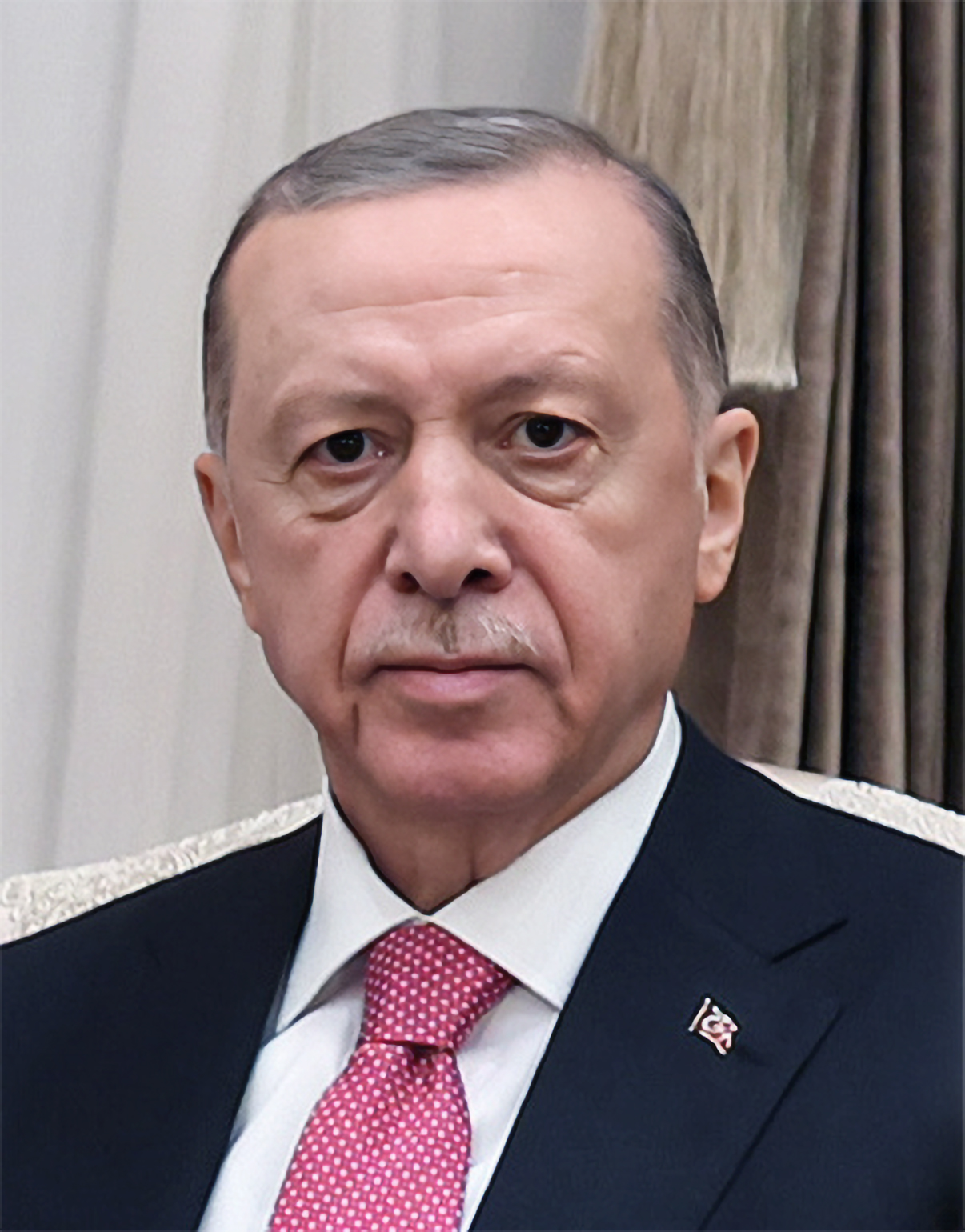
Republic of Turkey
Recep Tayyip Erdoğan
President of Turkey

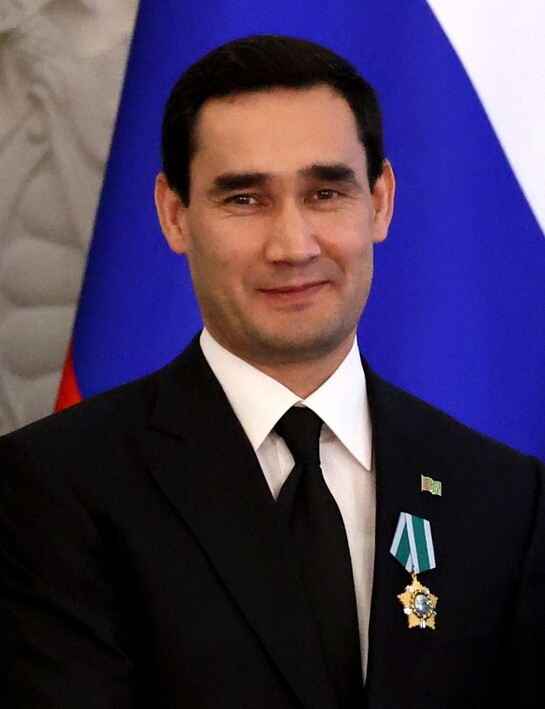
Turkmenistan
Serdar Berdimuhamedow
President of Turkmenistan

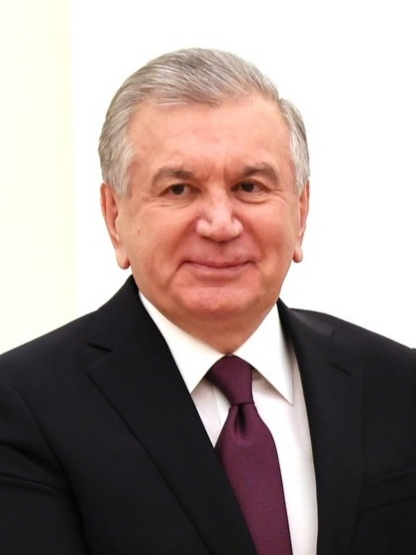
Republic of Uzbekistan
Shavkat Mirziyoyev
President of Uzbekistan

== Notes ==
By ISO 639-3 code
Enter an ISO code to find the corresponding language article.
