= Theatre of Turkey =

Turkish theatre refers to theater activities in Turkey. Turkey has four "major theatrical traditions": "folk theatre, popular theatre, court theater, and Western theater." Turkish folk theatre goes back thousands of years and has survived among rural communities. Popular theatre includes plays by live actors, puppet and shadow plays, and storytelling performances. An example for shadow play is Karagöz and Hacivat. Court theatre was the refined version of popular theatre. Beginning in the 19th century, Western theatre tradition started appearing in Turkey with the foundation of the Arevelian Tatron. Following the establishment of Turkish Republic, a state conservatory and the State Theatre Company were formed.

== See also ==
- Turkish State Theatres
- Istanbul City Theatres
- Culture of Turkey
