= Anjelika Akbar =

Turkish composer, pianist and writer

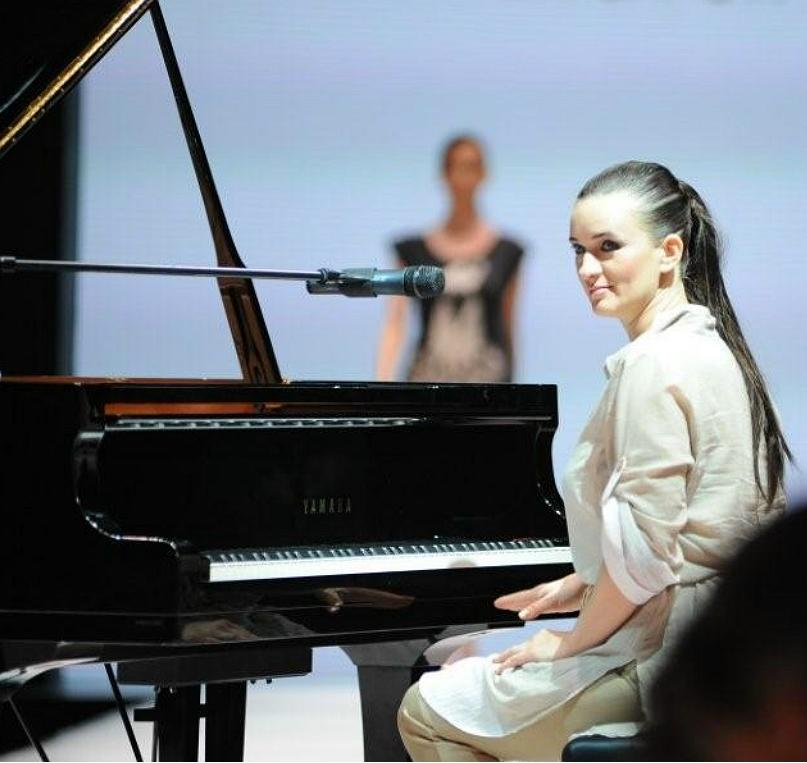
- Akbar with her piano before the concert

Background information
- Born: Angelika Rosenbaum; 1969 (age 56–57); Karaganda, Kazakh SSR, Soviet Union
- Origin: Ukrainian and Russian
- Genres: Classical
- Occupations: Musician, composer, concert pianist
- Instrument: Piano
- Years active: 1987–present
- Website: Akbar's Official Site

Anjelika Akbar (born 1969) is a Turkish composer, pianist and writer.

== Biography ==
Born Anjelika Timchenko to a Ukrainian (Father) and Russian (Mother) family. Her mother was a professional musician, and her father, Stanislav Konstantinovich Timchenko, was a philosopher who also directed an orchestra. Akbar could play the piano and read music before reaching the age of 3. Akbar began taking private piano lessons at age three. Her first master was V. Lipovetsky, one of the founders of the Chinese Harbin Conservatory and a teacher at the Moscow Conservatory.

At the age of four, she was discovered to possess absolute pitch, and admitted to Uspkensky State Music School, a Soviet school for child prodigies, drawing the interest of the Moscow State Conservatory musicians. She continued her education at the Tashkent division of the same school, where other child prodigies like Alexei Sultanov and Stanislav Ioudenitch studied as well.

She studied her 11-year-long piano and composition in the classes of Asst. Prof. V. Fadeyeva, Prof. A. Berlin and Prof. B. Zeydman of the St. Petersburg State Conservatory. Soon afterwards Akbar entered the Tashkent State Conservatory, where she studied composition, orchestration and piano for additional 5 years to complete her education.

== Career ==
Akbar completed her Master’s Degree in composition and orchestral conductor at Hacettepe State Conservatory, Turkey where she arrived in 1990 to write the music score of a film on world ecology that her husband had written. Akbar and her husband decided to stay permanently, and acquired Turkish citizenship. She received the “Degree for Proficiency in Art” in 1993 after submitting her thesis in the class of Ass. Prof. Turgay Erdener on the subject of Russian composer A. Skriabin’s “Analysis of Selected Piano Works in Harmonic, Melodic, Rhythmic, Formal and Philosophical Aspects” and composing “Symphony No.1” in Hacettepe State Conservatory. (“Proficiency in Art” is the equivalent of Doctorate for composers.)

Akbar recorded her first album “Su” (water), featuring her preludes in 1999.

She has been credited with releasing the first solo piano adaptation of Vivaldi's Four Seasons in the history of classical music, which was published by Sony Music International in 2002, making its way to the Sony Classical catalogue as the first ever Turkish Classical Music album in their catalogue. Again in 2002, Anjelika Akbar co-performed the “Bir'den Bir'e” album with Rana Erkan and Zara.

She has been working with Composer Ali Darmar since 2003. On the same year, she released her album “Bach A L'Orientale” in 2003, where she fuses Bach works with Oriental instruments.

“Bir Yudum Su” (A Drop of Water), an album including the artist's compositions and arrangements, was released in November, 2005.

She performed the Piano Concerto No.1 titled “Sevgi Çemberi” (Circle of Love) the world premiere during the introductory concert of 10th International CRR (Cemal Reşit Rey) Piano Festival. Her Symphonic Poem “Kutsal İmler” (Sacred Signs), composed for ‘Indian Instruments Group and Symphonic Orchestra’ was performed by the Symphonic Orchestra for the first time at the Atatürk Cultural Center, conducted by A. Pirolli. Her tribute composition for the first president of Turkey, Mustafa Kemal Atatürk, called “Güneşin Doğduğu Ufuk-Piyano ve Senfonik Orkestra için Rapsodi” (Horizon where the Sun Rises - Rhapsody for Piano and The Symphonic Orchestra) was performed by the Symphonic Orchestra of Turkey, and conducted by Rengim Gökmen as a world premiere.

In total, Akbar has composed over 400 works for the chorus, piano and other instruments with Symphonic Orchestra and Chamber Orchestra, and has performed in countless concerts in Russia, France, Germany, the Baltic Countries, Central Asia, India, Qatar, Turkey and Northern Cyprus.

Akbar has been interviewed by two of Turkish Airlines' official monthly Skylife's journalists, Julide Karahan and Ihsan Uysal, and was featured in an article in the airline's magazine published in November 2009.

In March 2016, the digital exhibition “Picturesque Istanbul”, containing famous paintings of Istanbul from about 200 years ago, was opened at the Istanbul Naval Museum. Akbar composed and directed the music used in the exhibition. At the end of the exhibition, she presented her concert "Oriental Rhapsody".

== Awards and recognitions ==
Anjelika Akbar is the holder of many awards, some of them are: Moscow “Sobesednik” Press Award; USSR Ethnic Music Award; “Golden Lenin Award” Uzbekistan “Best Young Composer” Award; USSR Board of Composers “Best Young Composer” Award; 4TH Nejat Eczacıbaşı Composition Contest “Third Place Prize”.

The Russian Board of Composers has recognized her as the “Best Young Composer”. She has become a member of Ukraine Board of Composers in 2006. Affiliating with the Board facilitates the composer members publishing their works or performing in concerts, also meant for its members to merit the title of “Honorary Artist” rewarded by the Ministry of Culture.

== Personal life ==
Akbar is married to Batu Tarman, a Turkish civil engineer and contractor, and is the mother of 2 children. Her son Yurek Akbar, from her first marriage, is a photographer.

== Discography ==
=== Albums ===
- Su (1999)
- Bir'den Bir'e (2002)
- Vivaldi - Four Seasons (2002)
- Bach A L'orientale (2003)
- Bach A L'orientale Remix (2004)
- Bir Yudum Su (2005)
- Raindrops By Anjelika (2009)
- İçimdeki Türkiyem (2010)
- Likafoni (2011)

== Soundtracks ==
- Original soundtrack for the film Beni Unutma (2011)

== Books ==
- İçimdeki Türkiyem, autobiography, 2010. ISBN 9786053600718
- Uçan Köpek Baaşa, children's book, 2011. ISBN 9786055340001
