= Ali Darmar =

Turkish pianist and composer

Ali Cemal Darmar (born May 13, 1946) is a Turkish pianist and composer. He studied piano with Verda Un at the Istanbul Conservatory and privately Ferdi Statzer, Popi Mihailides in his early years. Later he became a private student of Ayşegül Sarıca. He has a degree in Pharmacy.

In 1974 he moved to Paris to study with Nadia Boulanger and Annette Dieudonne privately, when he was also a registered student in Alfred Cortot's Ecole Normale de Musique de Paris, where he studied with Germaine Mounier, Monique Deschaussées and Cécille de Brunhoff. Darmar had scholarships from UNESCO (1976) and the French government (1981). He graduated from the composition department of the Rueil-Malmaison Conservatory, under the direction of Francine Aubin, then got another degree in composition from Jacques Castérède's class in the Ecole Normale De Musique. He came back to Istanbul in 1987 and became a piano teacher. He taught at Bilkent University from 1990 to 2000, and later at YTU Art and Design Faculty, until he retired in 2014.

Darmar was encouraged to compose by his piano teacher, Ferdi Statzer. One of his first compositions, "Aşkın Elinden", for piano and soprano, was performed by Suna Korat in 1973. His work is a gathering of the previous Turkish composers and the Neo-Romanticist movement in late 20th-century France.

His compositions include "Sümelâ" and "Metamorphose", for orchestra "Metro' da", ballet preludes for piano, a sonata, dance for two pianos, "Kâtibim", fantasy songs for choir and leads, "Cunda" concerto for piano and Orchestra, and "Through the silence" for violin and piano.

Darmar's works have been performed by Arın Karamürsel, Ayşegül Sarıca, and Ayla Erduran in Turkey and also abroad. His works have been recorded by Renan Koen (Piano Works of Ali Darmar, Lila Music, 2020, Istanbul). Anjelika Akbar, a concert pianist and composer, performed at the Erzurum 2011 Winter Universiade preparations' gathering in Erzurum. Her repertoire consisted of one of Darmar's compositions, along with the works of Johann Sebastian Bach, Ulvi Cemal Erkin and Ilhan Baran.

Darmar has worked with Anjelika Akbar since 2003.

He now resides in Istanbul and continues to teach piano.
