= Ateşten Gömlek =

1923 film

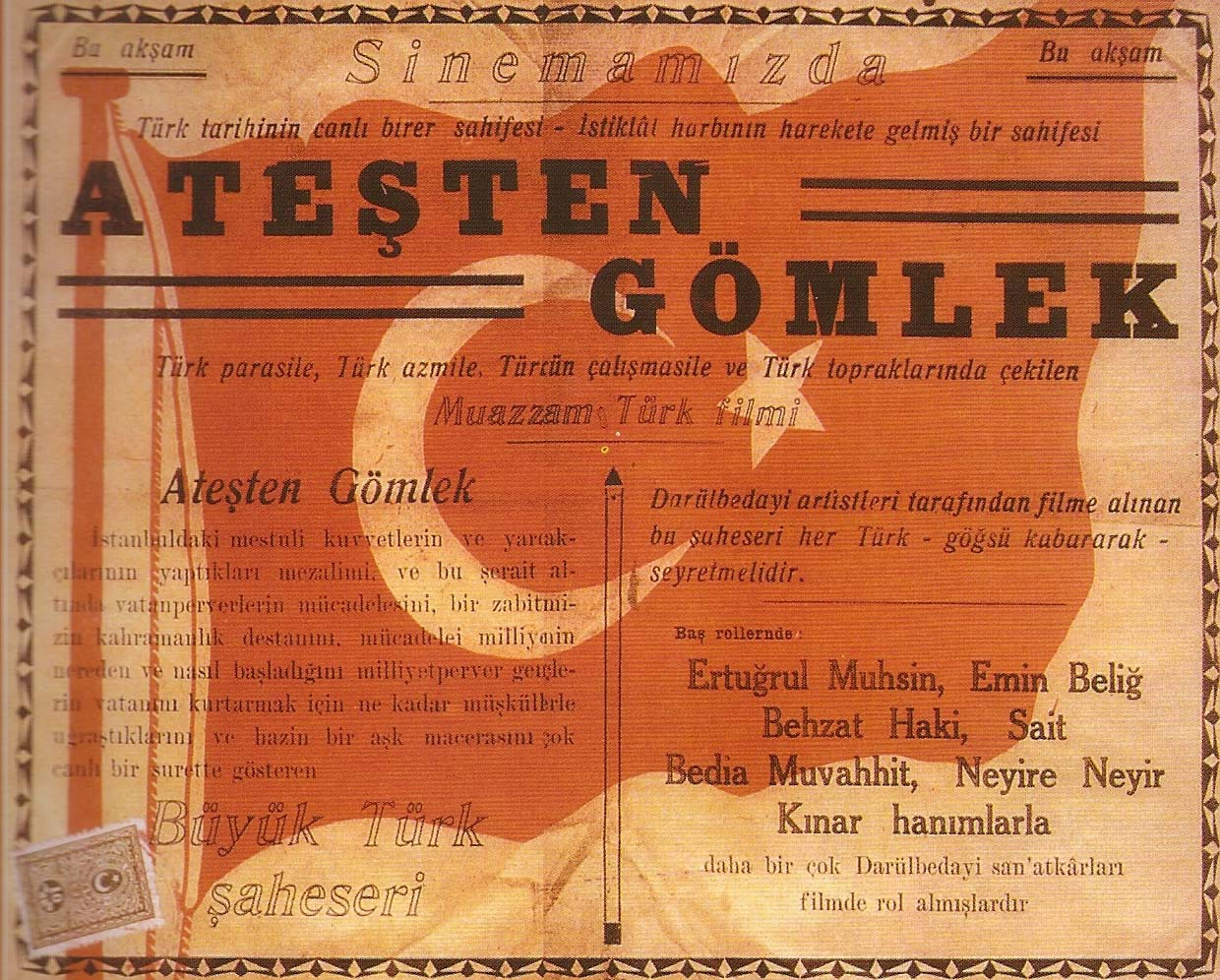
- Directed by: Muhsin Ertuğrul
- Written by: Muhsin Ertuğrul; Halide Edib Adıvar
- Produced by: Kemal Seden; Şakir Seden
- Starring: Muhsin Ertuğrul; Emin Beliğ Belli; Bedia Muvahhit; Neyyire Neyir; İbrahim Delideniz
- Cinematography: Cezmi Ar
- Release date: 23 April 1923
- Country: Turkey
- Language: Turkish

Ateşten Gömlek (The Daughter of Smyrna or The Shirt of Flame) is a 1923 black-and-white Turkish drama film, co-produced by Kemal Seden and Şakir Seden, written and directed by Muhsin Ertuğrul based on a novel of the same title (published in 1922) by Halide Edib Adıvar. The movie marks a milestone in the cinema of Turkey as for the first time ever Turkish Muslim actresses, namely Bedia Muvahhit and Neyyire Neyir, featured in a movie. It is in general about some events during the Turkish War of Independence (1919–1923). Its remake with the same title was released in 1950, directed by Vedat Örfi Bengü.

The movie was premiered on 23 April 1923, the third anniversary of Grand National Assembly of Turkey's foundation at Palas Sinema in Beyoğlu, Istanbul. It was shown to audience in two separate ticketed screens.

== Plot ==
The husband and the little son of Ayşe, featured by Bediha Muvahhit, are killed by Greek troops during the occupation of Izmir (1919–1922) after World War I (1914–1918). With the help of an Italian Levantine family, Ayşe, slightly wounded, goes to Istanbul, where she lives in the home of her paternal first cousin Peyami. There, she meets Major İhsan, a friend of Peyami. The three takes part at protest rallies against the occupation of Izmir held at Sultanahmet Square. However, following the occupation of Istanbul by the Allied forces briefly after, she is forced to escape to Anatolia accompanied by Peyami. The two joins the military unit of the Turkish National Resistance led by Major İhsan. Ayşe helps by nursing and Peyami becomes an officer subordinate to İhsan. Both men, İhsan and Peyami, fall in love with Ayşe. This love turns into a "shirt of fire" (Ateşten Gömlek) for both. Ayşe, however, has a heart for İhsan only. İhsan gets wounded in action, and she treats him. Meanwhile, İhsan promises to marry her after he enters Izmir as the first Turkish soldier. In order to draw Ayşe's attention, Peyami intends also to be the first soldier in Izmir. Peyami is killed in action soon after. Ayşe, hearing the bad news, runs to the front, but she is also killed by enemy shrapnel shell.

== First Turkish Muslim actresses ==
The novel Ateşten Gömlek written by Halide Edib Adıvar (1884–1964), a women's rights activist, who actually participated in the Turkish War of Independence, was first appeared as serial in the newspaper İkdam between 6 June and 11 August 1922 before it was published in book form. Since it became of great interest, its filming came into question.

In the Ottoman Empire, acting of Muslim women in movies was not allowed for reasons of religion. In all the movies, the woman roles were played by the Christian or Jewish women of minorities in Turkey. Adıvar stipulated that she would only permit her novel be filmed when the lead role is featured by a Turkish Muslim woman.

Muhsin Ertuğrul (1892–1979) asked his friend Ahmet Refet Muvahhit whether his newly married wife Bedia Muvahhit (1897–1994) would be eligible for the lead role. She accepted to feature as Ayşe. For the supporting female role of Kezban in the movie, a newspaper advertisement was published. Only one woman, Münire Eyüp (1902–1943), applied. She played in the movie under the pseudonym Neyyire Neyir. She later married to Muhsin Ertuğrul.

== Cast ==
- Muhsin Ertuğrul as İhsan
- Emin Beliğ Belli as Peyami
- Bedia Muvahhit as Ayşe
- Neyyire Neyir as Kezban
- Refik Kemal Arduman
- Hakkı Necip Ağrıman
- Vasfi Rıza Zobu
- Oğuz Yemen
- Behzat Haki
- Sait Köknar
- Behzat Butak
- Kınar Hanım
