= Bahçeşehir Muhsin Ertuğrul Theatre =

Theatre in Istanbul, Turkey

- Bahçeşehir Muhsin Ertuğrul Tiyatrosu
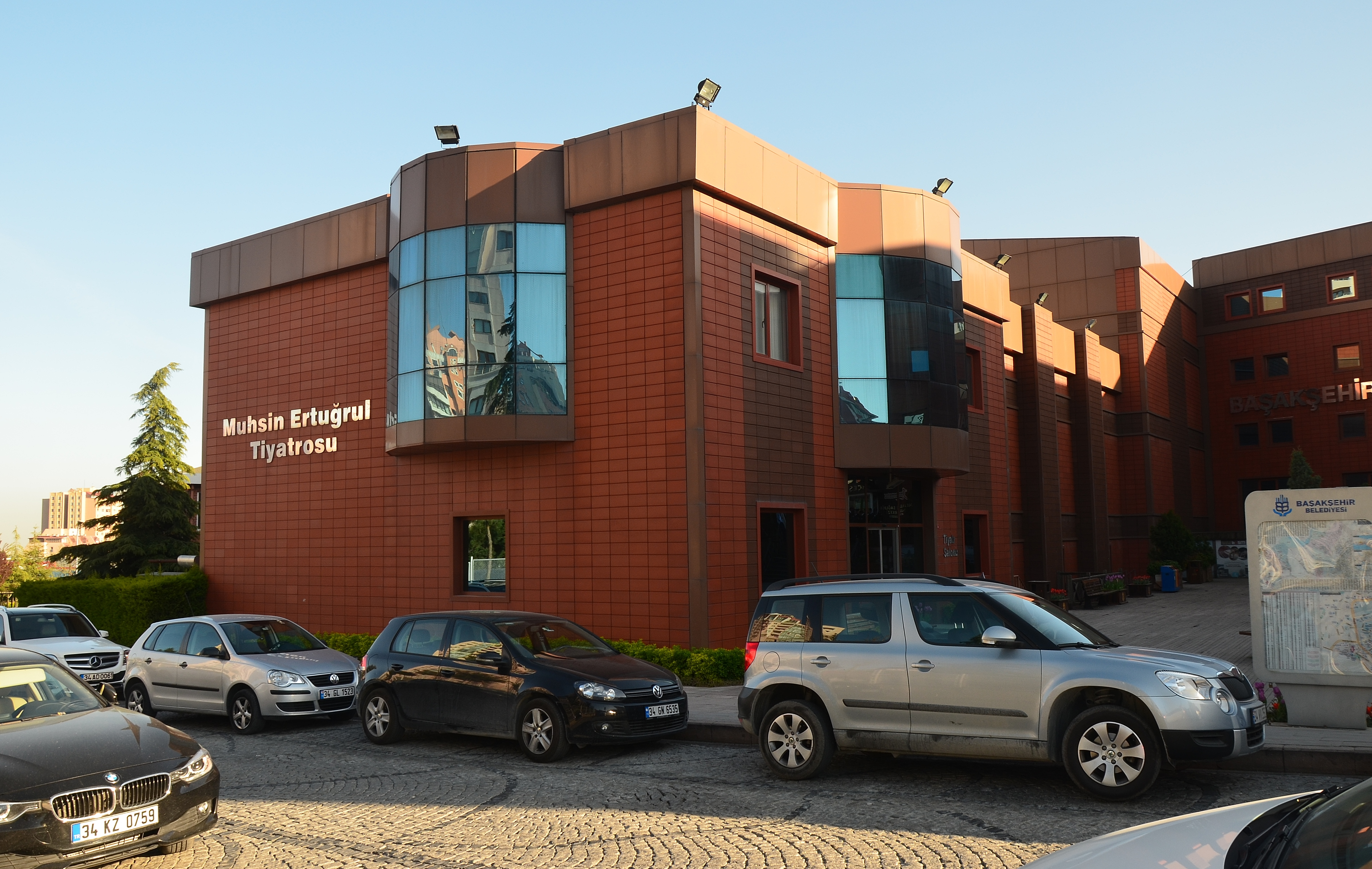
- Bahçeşehir Muhsin Ertuğrul Theatre in Istanbul, Turkey

- Location within Istanbul
- Address: Bahçeşehir, Şehir Polis Gaffar Okkan Sok. Başakşehir, Istanbul; Turkey
- Coordinates: 41°03′45″N 28°41′03″E
- Owner: Başakşehir Municipality
- Capacity: 318
- Type: Local authority
- Acreage: 1,920 m^{2} (20,700 sq ft)

Bahçeşehir Muhsin Ertuğrul Theatre (Turkish: Bahçeşehir Muhsin Ertuğrul Tiyatrosu) is a theatre venue located in Bahçeşehir quarter of Başakşehir district in Istanbul, Turkey. It is owned and operated by Başakşehir Municipality. The theatre is named in honor of the Turkish stage actor and director Muhsin Ertuğrul (1892–1979).

The theatre is situated in 2. Kısım neighborhood of Bahçeşehir, a suburban town of Istanbul. The theatre is built on an area of 1,920 m^{2} (20,700 sq ft). The theatre's audience hall occupies 216 m^{2} (2,330 sq ft), and has a total seating capacity of 318, including 70 seats in a second level gallery that serves the theatre balcony.

The 145 m^{2} (1,560 sq ft) large stage has a clearance of 14 m (46 ft). The stage is named after Haldun Dormen (born 1928), a Turkish actor and film director, who contributed much to the establishment of this theatre.

== See also ==
- Harbiye Muhsin Ertuğrul Stage, a theatre in Harbiye, Istanbul
- Muhsin Ertuğrul Stage, a theatre in Mamak, Ankara
