= Kadıköy Haldun Taner Stage =

Theatre venue in Istanbul, Turkey

- Kadıköy Haldun Taner Sahnesi
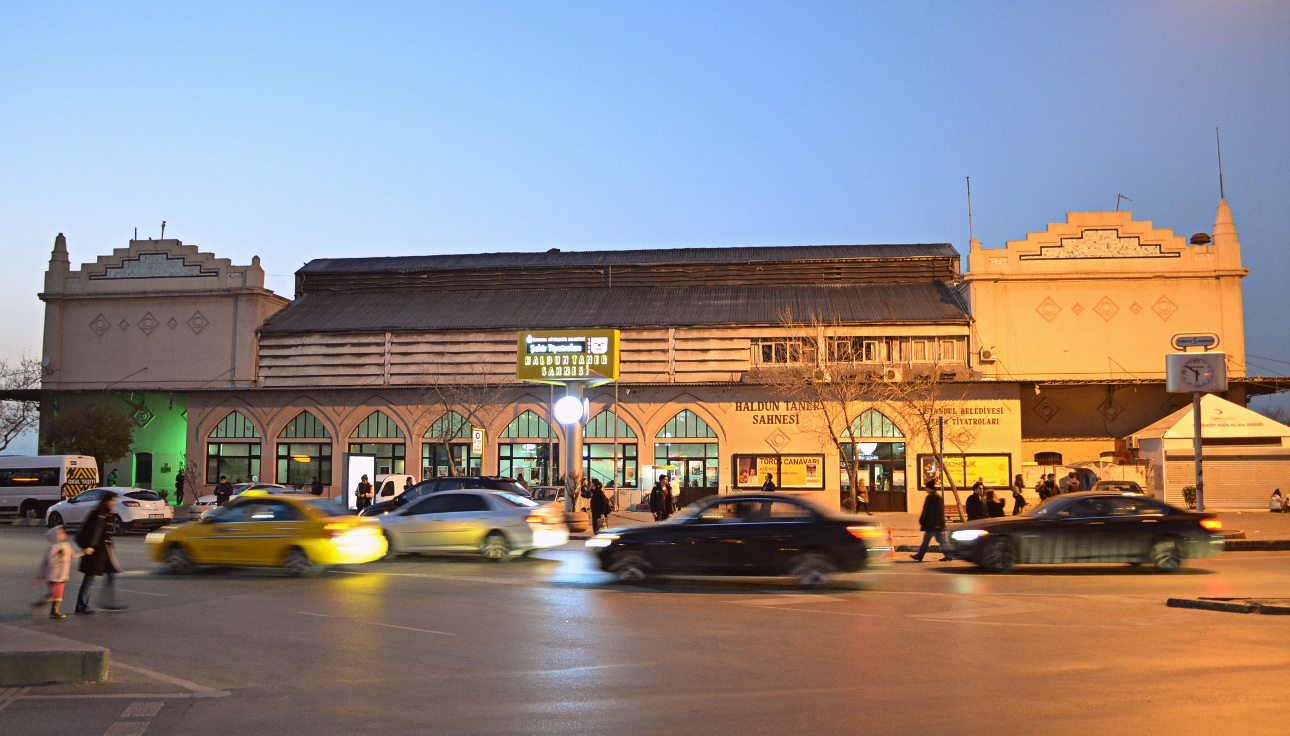
- Kadıköy Haldun Taner Stage in Kadıköy, İstanbul, Turkey.

- Location of Haldun Taner Stage in Istanbul.
- Address: İskele Meydanı; Kadıköy, Istanbul; Turkey
- Coordinates: 40.99182°N 29.02316°E
- Owner: Istanbul Metropolitan Municipality
- Operator: Şehir Tiyatroları (City Theatres)
- Capacity: 286
- Type: Local authority

Construction
- Opened: 1989; 37 years ago

Website
- www.ibb.gov.tr/sites/sehirtiyatrolari/en-US/Pages/KadikoyHaldunTanerSahnesi.aspx

Kadıköy Haldun Taner Stage (Turkish: Kadıköy Haldun Taner Sahnesi) is a theatre venue located in Kadıköy district of Istanbul, Turkey. It is owned by Istanbul Metropolitan Municipality and operated by its City Theatres (Şehir Tiyatroları) division. The theatre is named in honor of the Turkish playwright Haldun Taner (1915-1986).

Situated on the landing square (İskele Meydanı), the building, which hosts the theatre today, was constructed as the first modern market hall in Istanbul between 1925 and 1927. However, it stood vacant for a period of ten years since the traders in the agricultural marketing business did not want to be tenant. In order to utilize the vacant building, some parts of it was used by the fire department, and some parts served as depot for scrap vehicles. Its purposeful usage began in the 1940s, lasting until the mid 1970s.

After its complete renovation in 1984, the building was assigned to Istanbul University for use as conservatory in 1986. Finally, the ground floor of the building was transformed into a theatre venue in 1989.

Kadıköy Haldun Taner Stage has a seating capacity of 286.

== Second restoration ==
The theater building was redesigned by the Istanbul Metropolitan Municipality in 2008 according to the needs of the City Theaters for the Istanbul 2010 European Capital of Culture events and approved by the Istanbul Regional Board for the Protection of Cultural and Natural Assets. The costs were announced to be covered by the Istanbul 2010 European Capital of Culture Agency. Only minor repairs were made until 2021. On March 13, 2021, the restoration works of the building were started by the Istanbul Metropolitan Municipality and were planned to last 620 days.

== Past productions ==
2009

- Kar (Snow) by Orhan Pamuk

2013

- Ateşli Sabır (Ardiente paciencia) by Antonio Skármeta
- Perşembenin Hanımları (Les Dames du jeudi) by Loleh Bellon
- Ocak by Turgut Özakman
- Para by Necip Fazıl Kısakürek
- Yolcu by Nazım Hikmet Ran

== See also ==
- Süreyya Opera House
- Harbiye Muhsin Ertuğrul Stage
