= Turgay Erdener =

Turkish composer

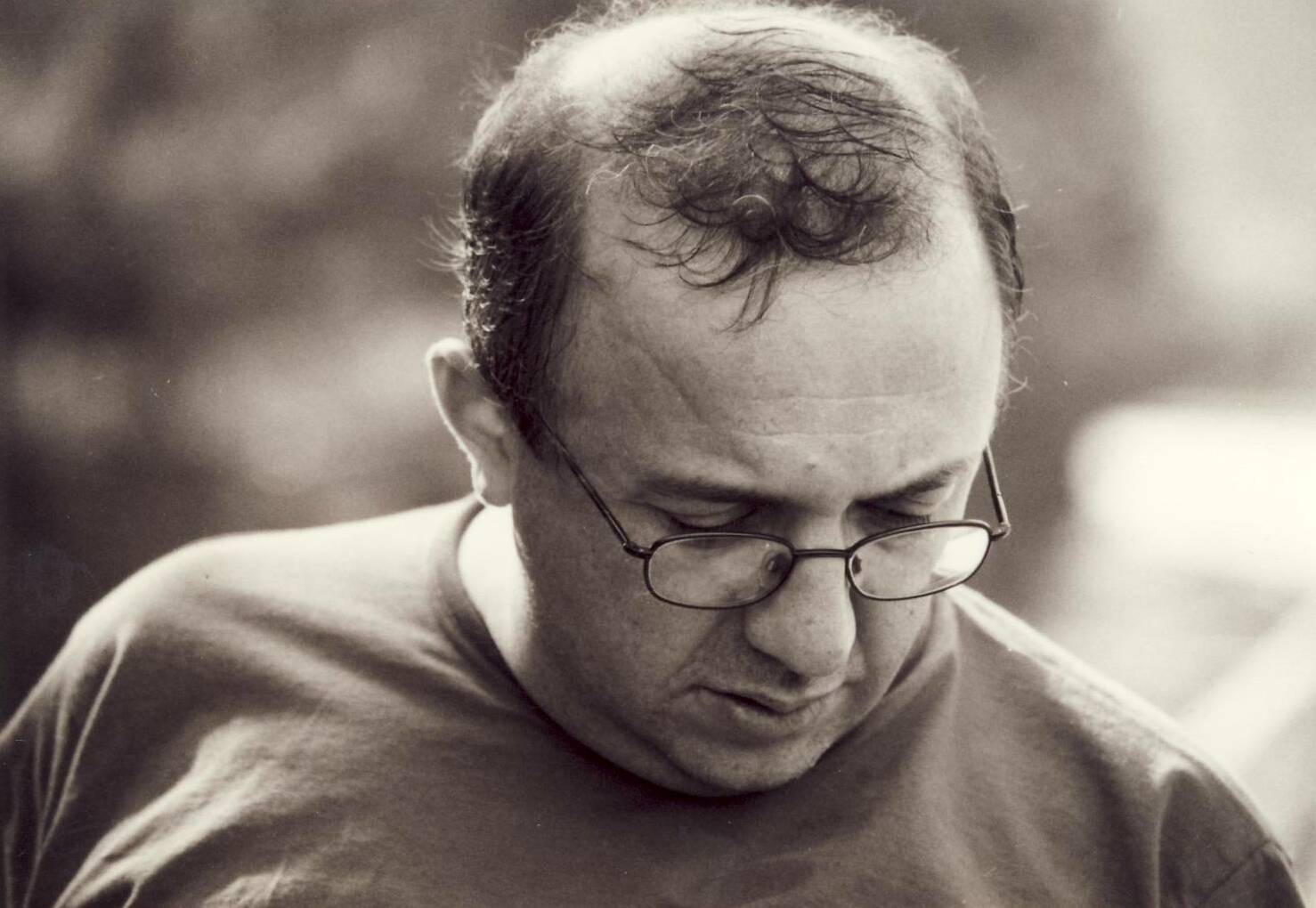
Turgay Erdener (Gümüşhane, 15 June 1957) is a contemporary Turkish composer of classical music.

Turgay Erdener (Gümüşhane, 15 June 1957) is a contemporary Turkish composer of classical music. He first studied mandolin then entered into the piano department at Ankara State Conservatory (ADK). He has taught composition at the conservatory since 1979. He is married to the Ankara State Opera and Ballet soloist soprano Selva Erdener who has premiered his song cycle Sen sen sen (You you you) and Afife a ballet with songs based on the life of actress Afife Jale.

== Selected works ==
- Mi’den Dört Bölüm.Four Movements on E, string orchestra, 1985
- İstanbulname operetta, libretto by Ferdi Merter, 1993
- Komik komik şeyler oluyor musical, libretto by Murat Göksu, 1993
- Various works for guitar.

Film music;

- Likya'nın sönmeyen ateşi – "Eternal Flames of Lycia", 1977 Süha Arın
- Mimar Sinan'ın Anıları – based on the life of Sinan the Architect, 1989 Süha Arın

== Recordings ==
1. Üç türk melodisi', Ahmet Kanneci, guitar (Boyut Yayıncılık/BMG, 1997)
2. Teo - adagio for Orchestra. Düsseldorfer Symphoniker dir. Rengim Gökmen (Deutsche Welle Classics: A-511673, 1997)
3. Sen Sen Sen - song cycle. Selva Erdener, soprano; Ekrem Öztan, klarinet; Tahir Öğüt, trompet; Ahmet Kanneci, guitar; Tahir Aydoğdu, kanun; Tayfun Bozok, Derya Bozok, keman; Ercan Gören, viola; Erdoğan Davran, cello; Bora Akyol, bass guitar; İvan Çelak, accordion (Kalan Müzik Yapım: CD195, 2001)
4. Obua Konçertinosu; ve Mi'den dört bölüm Taşkın Oray, obua; Düsseldorfer Kammerorchester dir. Rengim Gökmen (Carillon: 24 753)
5. Yeşil düşler. Şefika Kutluer, flute, Borusan Oda Orkestrası cond. Saim Akçıl (Sony: SAM P CD.30.2004444.10)
6. Afife. Selva Erdener, soprano; Tahir Aydoğdu, kanun; Tchaikovsky Symphony Orchestra of Moscow Radio Rengim Gökmen (Yapı Kredi Sigorta)
7. Ahmet Kanneci Plays Turgay Erdener Ahmet Kanneci guitar (BMG Sony – Sony Classical)
8. İstanbul’un ses telleri Şirin Pancaroğlu harp, Tahir Aydoğdu kanun, Derya Türkan; klasik kemençe, Yurdal Tokcan; ud (Kalan)
9. Nereye Aşkım Selva Erdener & Turkuvaz Beşlisi Kalan
