= Muhsin Ertuğrul Stage =

Theatre venue in Turkey

- Muhsin Ertuğrul Sahnesi
- Location within Turkey
- Address: Talatpaşa Boulevard 167
- Location: Dikimevi, Mamak, Ankara
- Coordinates: 39°56′04″N 32°52′36″E
- Owner: Mamak Municipality
- Operator: Turkish State Theatres
- Capacity: 288
- Type: Local authority

Muhsin Ertuğrul Stage (Turkish: uhsin Ertuğrul Sahnesi) is a theatre venue in Ankara, Turkey. It is owned by Mamak Municipality and operated by the Turkish State Theatres. It is named in honour of the Turkish stage actor and director Muhsin Ertuğrul (1892–1979).

The theatre is situated inside the Mamak Cultural Center (Turkish: Mamak Kültür Merkezi) on Talatpaşa Boulevard 167 at Dikimevi, Mamak, Ankara. The interior was renovated and the technical infrastructure was modernized by preserving the theatre's historic texture. The auditorium has a total seating capacity of 288, including 50 box seats.

The theatre is generally home to performances of municipal actors, choirs and folk dance groups. It hosts also activities of local foundations, associations and schools. It is among the official venues of Turkish State Theatres.

== Some notable past productions ==
- Sevgili Doktor (The Good Doctor) by Neil Simon after Anton Chekhov (2016)

== See also ==
- Harbiye Muhsin Ertuğrul Stage, a theatre venue in Istanbul
- Bahçeşehir Muhsin Ertuğrul Theatre, a theatre venue in Bahçeşehir, Başakşehir, Istanbul
