= Halide (name) =

Halide is a feminine Turkish given name. Notable people with the name include:

== People ==
- Halide Edib Adıvar (1884–1964), Turkish novelist and feminist political leader
- Halide Pişkin (1906–1959), Turkish stage, radio and movie actress
- Halide Nusret Zorlutuna (1901–1984), Turkish poet and novelist

== See also ==
- Halide, a binary compound
