= Hüseyin Kemal Gürmen =

Turkish actor

Hüseyin Kemal Gürmen (born 1901, Istanbul, Ottoman Empire; died March 1, 1974, Istanbul) was a Turkish theater and cinema actor. He made his debut at the Darülbedayi theater in 1918, and his film debut in 1919. By 1923, he was a nationally known actor.
