= Semyon Kadyshev =

Russian writer

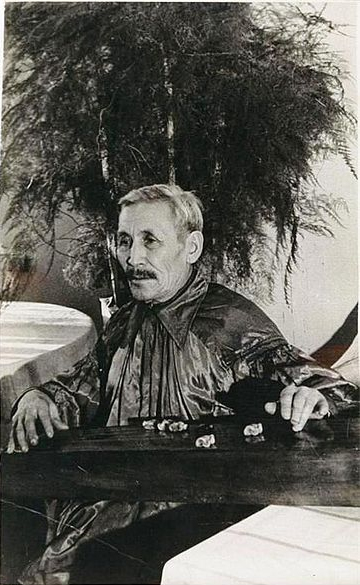
- Born: 16 September 1885; Achinsky District, Yeniseysk Governorate, Russian Empire
- Died: 30 June 1977 (aged 91) (flag) Soviet Union
- Occupation: Folklorist
- Awards: Order of the Badge of Honour

Semyon Prokopyevich Kadyshev (Russian: Семён Прокопьевич Ка́дышев; 16 September 1885 – 30 June 1977) was a Khakas Haiji storyteller, Dastan author, and member of the Writers Union of the USSR. He was considered a master of traditional Khakas instruments, such as the chatkhan and khomys, as well as throat singing.

== Early life ==
Kadyshev was born into a poor family in the Achinsky District, where he learned the art of Haiji storytelling from his father. The Kadyshev family was known for their storytellers, and their skill in playing traditional Khakas instruments.

In his youth, Kadyshev worked as a labourer for a kulak named "Matrosov". He was tasked with hunting, woodcutting, and panning for gold.

In 1914, Kadyshev was drafted into the Imperial Russian Army. After the Russian Revolution, he became a partisan.

== Later life ==
Due to his age, Kadyshev was not sent to fight in World War II, however, his sons were drafted, and one of them was killed.

Kadyshev became a professional storyteller in 1948. During this time, he was often in contact with the composer Alexander Kenel, who would transcribe his improvisation on the chatkhan into sheet music.

Kadyshev knew and performed over thirty heroic legends, and dozens of legends, traditions and fairy tales. In 1954, Kadyshev was the first of the Khakas folklorists to be admitted to the Writers Union of the USSR. In 1960, he spoke at the 25th Congress of Orientalists in Moscow.

Kadyshev wrote four books, including Songs of the Khaiji (1962), and The Glorious Way (1965).

For most of his life, Kadyshev lived in the aul Troshkin, in the Republic of Khakassia. He had wide communication with representatives of the musical community, scientists, and poets.

In 1965, Kadyshev was awarded the Order of the Badge of Honour for his contribution to the development of Khakas culture.

Kadyshev died in 1977.

== Legacy ==
- His name is engraved at the Khakas Republican Center for Culture and Folk Art, and on one of the streets of Abakan.
- In Troshkin, the Semyon Prokopyevich Kadyshev Museum was established in his former house. There is also a street named after him.
- The International Organization of Turkic Culture declared the year 2015 as the Year of Haldun Taner and Semyon Kadyshev.
- In 2021, the Ministry of Culture of Khakassia began raising funds to construct a monument to Kadyshev in Shirinsky District. The monument was completed in 2023.
