= Haldun Taner =

Turkish playwright and story writer

- Born: 16 March 1915; Istanbul, Ottoman Empire
- Died: 7 May 1986 (aged 71); Istanbul, Turkey
- Occupation: Playwright

Haldun Taner (16 March 1915 – 7 May 1986) was a well-known Turkish playwright and short story writer.

== Biography ==
He was born on 16 March 1915 in Istanbul. After graduating from the Galatasaray High School in 1935, he studied politics and economy at the University of Heidelberg in Germany, until a serious health problem forced him to return to Turkey, where he graduated from the Faculty of German Literature and Linguistics in 1950. He also studied theatre and philosophy at the University of Vienna between 1955 and 1957 under the direction of Heinz Kindermann (1894–1985), an Austrian theater and literary scholar.

As a well-disciplined writer accumulating a rich blend of culture, Taner wrote a great number of stories, generally humorous; essays, newspaper columns, travel writings and theatre plays, in particular, brought him several important awards including the New York Herald Tribune Story Contest First Prize (1954), the Sait Faik Story Award (1954), the International Festival of the Humor of Bordighera Award (1969), and so on. Among his plays, the most popular is Keşanlı Ali Destanı (Epopee of Ali of Keshan). His stories have been translated into German, French, English, Russian, Greek, Slovenian, Swedish, and Hebrew. He was among the contributors of the literary magazine Papirüs which was edited by Cemal Süreya.

In 1967, together with Metin Akpınar, Zeki Alasya and Ahmet Gülhan, he founded the Devekuşu Kabare (literally, the Ostrich Cabaret; see the Turkish Wikipedia entry Devekuşu Kabare). He educated and worked with many actors and directors. In addition, he has a distinguished place in Turkish literature due to his essays, and newspaper articles.

Haldun Taner died of a sudden heart attack on 7 May 1986 in Istanbul. He was laid to rest at the Küplüce Cemetery following the religious funeral service at the Teşvikiye Mosque on 9 May.

== Legacy ==
- A theatre venue in Kadıköy district of Istanbul is named in his honor.
- The International Organization of Turkic Culture declared the year 2015 as the Year of Haldun Taner and Semyon Kadyshev.

== Bibliography ==
Theater

- Günün Adamı (1957)
- Dışardakiler (1957)
- Ve Değirmen Dönerdi (1958)
- Fazilet Eczanesi (1960)
- Timsah (1960)
- Lütfen Dokunmayın (1961)
- Huzur Çıkmazı (1962)
- Keşanlı Ali Destanı (1964)
- Gözlerimi Kaparım, Vazifemi Yaparım (1964)
- Eşeğin Gölgesi (1965)
- Zilli Zarife (1966)
- Vatan Kurtaran Şaban (1967)
- Bu Şehr-i İstanbul Ki (1968)
- Sersem Kocanın Kurnaz Karısı (1969)
- Astronot Niyazi (1970)
- Ha Bu Diyar (1971)
- Dün Bugün (1971)
- Aşk-u Sevda (1973)
- Dev Aynası (1973)
- Yâr Bana Bir Eğlence (1974)
- Ayışığında Şamata (1977)
- Hayırdır İnşallah (1980)
- Marko Paşa (1985)
- Aleyna'nın kızı (1985)

Stories

- Geçmiş Zaman Olur Ki (1946)
- Yaşasın Demokrasi (1948)
- Şişhane'ye Yağmur Yağıyordu (1950)
- Tuş (1951)
- Onikiye Bir Var (1953)
- Ayışığında Çalışkur (1954)
- Sancho’nun Sabah Yürüyüşü (1964)
- Konçinalar (1967)
- Kızıl Saçlı Amazon (1970)
- Yalıda Sabah (1979)
- Şeytan Tüyü (1980)
- Bir Kavak Ve İnsanlar
- Ayak
