= Ergican Saydam =

Ergican Saydam (March 28, 1929 – December 21, 2009) was a Turkish pianist and piano pedagogue. He was an advocate of Turkish composers such as Cemal Reşit Rey, Ahmed Adnan Saygun, Cengiz Tanç and İlhan Usmanbaş whose music he premiered and recorded. His repertory centers around German romantic literature, particularly the music of Ludwig van Beethoven, Franz Schubert, and Robert Schumann.

== Biography ==
Ergican Saydam was born on March 28, 1929, in Istanbul. He studied with Ferdi Statzer at the Istanbul Conservatory and with Friedrich Wührer in Staatliche Hochschule für Musik in Munich. Saydam gave more than 2,000 concerts in five continents. He made several recordings of piano literature and also contemporary composers. He also taught at the Mimar Sinan Istanbul Conservatory and was appointed to a professorship. In 1986, Ergican Saydam recorded the world premiere (after the composer) of Franz Liszt's Grande Marche Paraphrase pour Abdul Medjid Khan (Sultan Abdülmecid) composed in 1847. He made also the premiere of Cemal Reşit Rey's second Piano Concerto with the Presidential Symphony Orchestra (Ankara) under the composers baton. He was the jury for the International Maurice Ravel Piano Competition in 1975. He also received the Bad Gastein, Margrit Ramdohr and Simon Bolivar prizes.

He died on December 21, 2009, in Istanbul.

== Publications ==
Her daughter mezzo-soprano Ezgi Saydam wrote Taburede 60 Yıl | 60 Years on Stool (Arma, 2009).

== Discography ==
He recorded an LP called Turkish Themes including works of Mozart, Beethoven, Liszt and also contemporary Turkish composers such as Ulvi Cemal Erkin, Cenan Akın, Bülent Tarcan, and İlhan Usmanbaş. He also made numerous special recordings for the TRT Radio (Turkish National Radio-TV).
