= Bedia Muvahhit =

Turkish actress (1896–1994)

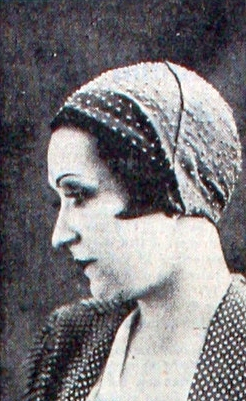
- Born: Emine Bedia; 1896; Kadıköy, Istanbul, Ottoman Empire
- Died: 20 January 1994 (aged 98); Istanbul, Turkey
- Resting place: Aşiyan Asri Cemetery, Istanbul
- Education: Lycée Notre Dame de Sion Istanbul
- Occupations: Stage and movie actress
- Years active: 1913–1993
- Spouses: Ahmet Muvahhit (m. 1923; div. 1927) Friedrich von Statzer (m. 1933; div. 1951)
- Awards: 1971 Atatürk Prize for Art; 1987 State Actress; 1988 Golden Tulip Award

Emine Bedia Muvahhit (1896 – 20 January 1994) was a Turkish stage and movie actress. She is remembered as one of the first Muslim movie actresses in Turkey debuting in 1923.

== Personal life ==
She was born in 1896 to Ahmet Şekip Bey, a prosecutor from profession, and his wife Emine in Kadıköy, Istanbul, Ottoman Empire. She began her primary education at Saint Antoine School on Büyükada, and went on at Kadıköy Terakki School for secondary education. Then, she studied at the French language Lycée Notre Dame de Sion Istanbul. She could speak French and Greek as foreign languages.

Bedia Muvahhit was employed in 1914 as a switchboard operator at the state-owned telephone company in Istanbul becoming one of the first Muslim women in the Ottoman Empire to work at the public service sector. Following a campaign of a newly established journal and an association for defending women's rights, the post administration decided to replace the telephone operators, who were in the beginning foreign language speaking girls from Christian or Jewish minorities with heavily accented Turkish.

In 1921, she began to work as a teacher for French language at the Erenköy Girls High School. During this time, she met stage actor Ahmet Muvahhit, while she asked him for an autograph after a theatre play. The couple got married in 1923. From this marriage, Bedia Muvahhit had a son Şuayip Sina Arbel (1922-1991). In 1923, Bedia Muvahhit quit her teacher post, and devoted herself to an acting career. She successfully played in movies and on stage. However, her spouse Ahmet Muvahhit died in 1927.

She married in 1933 Friedrich von Statzer (1906–1974), aka later Ferdi Statzer, an Austrian musician, who came in 1932 to Turkey, and was teaching classical piano at the Istanbul Municipal Conservatory and serving as a composer and classical pianist at the Istanbul Municipal Theatre (Ottoman Turkish: Darülbedayi), where she was acting on stage. Her second marriage lasted 18 years until 1951 when they divorced. After that, she adopted her surname by her first marriage to use as her stage name.

== Acting career ==
In 1917, she made her entrance into Turkish (then known as Ottoman) film industry, by a minor role in the film Pençe. In 1923, soon after her marriage to actor Ahmet Muvahhit, film director Muhsin Ertuğrul, a friend of both, was about to shoot a movie based on the novel Ateşten Gömlek (The Daughter of Smyrna) by Halide Edib Adıvar (1884–1964).

The female playwright, a participant of the Turkish War of Independence (1919–1923) and a women's right activist, insisted on the lead role being featured by a Turkish Muslim woman. Bedia Muvahhit was chosen as actress to much surprise of herself. She featured with Neyyire Neyir (1902–1943).

Right after the filming of Ateşten Gömlek was finished, she took part in a theatre tour of Darülbedayi in İzmir along with her husband, actor Ahmet Muvahhit. Mustafa Kemal (Atatürk), who was that time also in the city, asked her husband that Bedia Muvahhit performs in the play he would watch, because also Turkish Muslim women have to get to the stage.

She learned in one day her role of "Saride" in the play Ceza Kanunu (Criminal Law), an adaption by Ahmet Nuri Sekizinci from the 1907 French play "Vingt jours à l'ombre" by Pierre Veber and Maurice Hennequin. On July 31, 1923, just one week after the signing of the Treaty of Lausanne, Bedia Muvahhit debuted on the stage before the new Turkey's leader, who congratulated her after the play. She performed then in more than 200 plays in municipal theatres.

After an acting career of more than fifty years, she retired in 1975 from the stage at the Istanbul Municipal Theatre.

In recognition of her more than 50 year service in theater, the union of theater actors known as (TÎ-SAN) Tüm Tiyatro Sanatçıları Birliği decided to award her and others that had given over 50 years of service to theater the 'Theater Service Gift' (Turkish:Tiyatro Emek Armağanı). The younger generation of theater actors decided to give this gift to the older generation in recognition of their service and efforts. This gift, which was a sculpture by Gürdal Duyar, would be given to them at the İstanbul Sanat Merkez (formerly known as Union Française). A bust of Muvahhit made by Duyar also stands in the Artists Park in Akatlar.

== Death ==
Bedia Muvahhit died on 20 January 1994 aged 98 in Istanbul University Hospital, where she was taken following a home accident. She was laid to rest in Istanbul's Asiyan Cemetery.

== Filmography ==
- Ateşten Gömlek (1923)
- İstanbul Sokaklarında (1931)
- Karım Beni Aldatırsa (1933)
- Beklenen Şarkı (1953)
- Paydos (1954)
- Yaşlı Gözler (1955)
- Son Beste (1955)
- Gülmeyen Yüzler (1955)
- Çapkınlar (1961)
- Yumurcak (1961)
- Gönül Ferman Dinlemez (1962)
- Bir Gecelik Gelin (1962)
- Belalı Torun (1962)
- Barut Fıçısı (1963)
- Genç Kızlar (1963)
- İstanbul Kaldırımları (1964)
- Kaynana Zırıltısı (1964)
- Manyaklar Köşkü (1964)
- Gençlik Rüzgarı (1964)
- Halk Çocuğu (1964)
- Anasının Kuzusu (1964)
- Gel Barışalım (1964)
- Sarı Kızla Kopuk Ahmet (1964)
- Hizmetçi Dediğin Böyle Olur (1964)
- Hep O Şarkı (1965)
- Sevinç Gözyaşları (1965)
- Bozuk Düzen (1966)
- Aşkın Gözyaşları (1966)
- Çalıkuşu (1966)
- Sokak Kızı (1966)
- O Kadın (1966)
- Sevgilim Artist Olunca (1966)
- Şoförün Kızı (1966)
- Evlat Uğruna (1967)
- Sen Benimsin (1967)
- Zehirli Hayat (1967)
- Yaşlı Gözler (1967)
- Dünyanın En Güzel Kadını (1968)
- Katip (1968)
- Ateşli Çingene (1969)
- Esmerin Tadı Sarışının Adı (1969)
- Lekeli Melek (1969)
- Son Mektup (1969)
- Tatlı Sevgilim (1969)
- Yumurcak (1969)

== Awards ==
- 1981 Atatürk Prize for Art
- 1987 State Actress of Turkey, for her contributions to the Turkish culture.
- 1988 International Istanbul Film Festival (Golden Tulip Prize)

== Legacy ==
- "Bedia Muvahhit Theatre Award" is bestowed in her honor annually since 1995 by Istanbul Municipal Theatre and Union of Turkish Women to talented young stage actresses for their debut.
- Turkish Post issued a postage stamp depicting her portrait.
