= Hagop Ayvaz =

Theatre artist and writer (1911–2006)

- Born: April 2, 1911; Istanbul
- Died: September 29, 2006 (aged 95); Istanbul
- Burial place: Şişli Armenian Cemetery
- Citizenship: Ottoman Empire
- Occupation(s): theater artist, writer, publisher
- Notable work: Kulis
- Spouse: Arşaluys Balayan
- Children: 2

Hagop Ayvaz (April 2, 1911, Istanbul – September 29, 2006, Istanbul), was an Istanbul-based theater artist, writer, and publisher of Armenian origin. He founded Kulis, the first Armenian theater magazine in Turkey, which was published continuously for 50 years (1946–1996).

Hagop Ayvaz was born in 1911 in Yenikapı, Istanbul. He conducted his studies at Levon Vartuhyan School in Topkapı and later at Esayan School in Taksim. After graduation, he worked with his stepfather as a shoemaker in Çatal Han, Beyazıt.

Ayvaz's involvement in the theater world began in the late 1920s, when he was introduced to Krikor Hagopyan, the director of the Arevelyan Taferahump [Oriental Theatre] by Harutyun Samurkaş. He first appeared on stage in 1928 in the Armenian operetta Çağatsbanin Ağçigı [Miller's Daughter, in Western Armenian] by Srapion Manasyan. After that, he started to make part of Istanbul's theater world. Subsequently, he performed with various theater groups in different theaters. He wrote his first play in 1932, entitled Bir Aktörün Hayatı veya Son Perde [The Life of An Actor or the Last Act, in Turkish]. Since plays in Armenian were banned during this period, he first wrote it in Turkish. After the ban on Armenian theater was lifted, he renamed it Shaderen Meg gam verchin Varakuyr [One of Many of the Last Act, in Western Armenian] and published the script in Armenian in 1950.

In 1935, Ayvaz started writing theater criticism for the newspaper Jamanak. He also contributed to other periodicals, including Turkiya, Gavroş and Nor Or. In 1936, he was drafted for one year of military service in Afyonkarahisar, where he managed the theater's film program. He was called up again in 1939 after the outbreak of World War II. This time, he served in very hostile conditions. He was drafted for the third time in 1941 under the so-called Twenty-Classes scheme targeting Turkish non-Muslim citizens. The wealth tax imposed on Turkey's non-Muslims in 1942 also negatively affected him, and he was only saved from being sent to the Aşkale work camp by an officer he had met in Afyonkarahisar.

In 1946, he founded his own theater magazine entitled Kulis, first of its kind published in Turkey in Western Armenian. While publishing the magazine, he continued acting and directing in various theatres. In 1960, he was asked to chair the theater committee of Esyan High School Alumni Association; simultaneously he established his own theater with amateur actors, entitled Pokr Taderahump [Small Theater, in Western Armenian].

He married Arşaluys Balayan in 1937 and had two children named Suzan and Garo. He died on September 29, 2006.

== Kulis ==
Hagop Ayvaz founded the magazine, whose name means "backstage", in 1946 with help of Zareh Arşag and Nazaret Donikyan. The cover design was made by Berc Gürten. After the first years, when Ayvaz published the magazine alone in 500 copies, it gained greater popularity and started to be published in 2,500 copies. Ayvaz's travels to Syria, Lebanon, Egypt, Iraq, Greece, and Iran helped increase the magazine's subscriber numbers. Between 1954 and 1956 existed also a Turkish-language version of the magazine. The magazine was published without interruption until 1996.

The magazine focused not only on the Armenian theater scene in Turkey but also on other aspects of the country's theater scene.

From 1947 to 1950, Ayvaz organized Kulis Nights annually, providing an opportunity for Armenian and Turkish actors to meet.

== Hagop Ayvaz for Agos ==
Hagop Ayvaz wrote columns for the Agos magazine between the years 1997 and 2006 in various Armenian and Turkish sections. His articles from the Armenian-written columns Lutsika Dudu were in 2003 published in a volume by Aras Publishing House.

== Hagop Ayvaz's Archive ==
The personal archive of Hagop Ayvaz covers the period from the mid 19th century to the beginning of the 21st century.

The archive was donated to Agos newspaper after Ayvaz's death in 2006. Subsequently, the donation of some of Ayvaz's personal effects, awards, and full collection of magazine Kulis by Dr. Barkev Balımoğu to Hrant Dink Foundation in 2019 made the archive more coherent and compact.

The archive contains play manuscripts, printed texts, magazines and newspapers, photographs, drawings, postcards and more. The archive also includes a 1104-issue full collection of magazine Kulis. Some of the material of the archive was used for the exhibition on Hagop Ayvaz entitled Coulisse: Hagop Ayvaz, A Chronicler of Theater.
