= Harbiye Muhsin Ertuğrul Stage =

Theatre venue in Istanbul, Turkey

- Harbiye Muhsin Ertuğrul Sahnesi
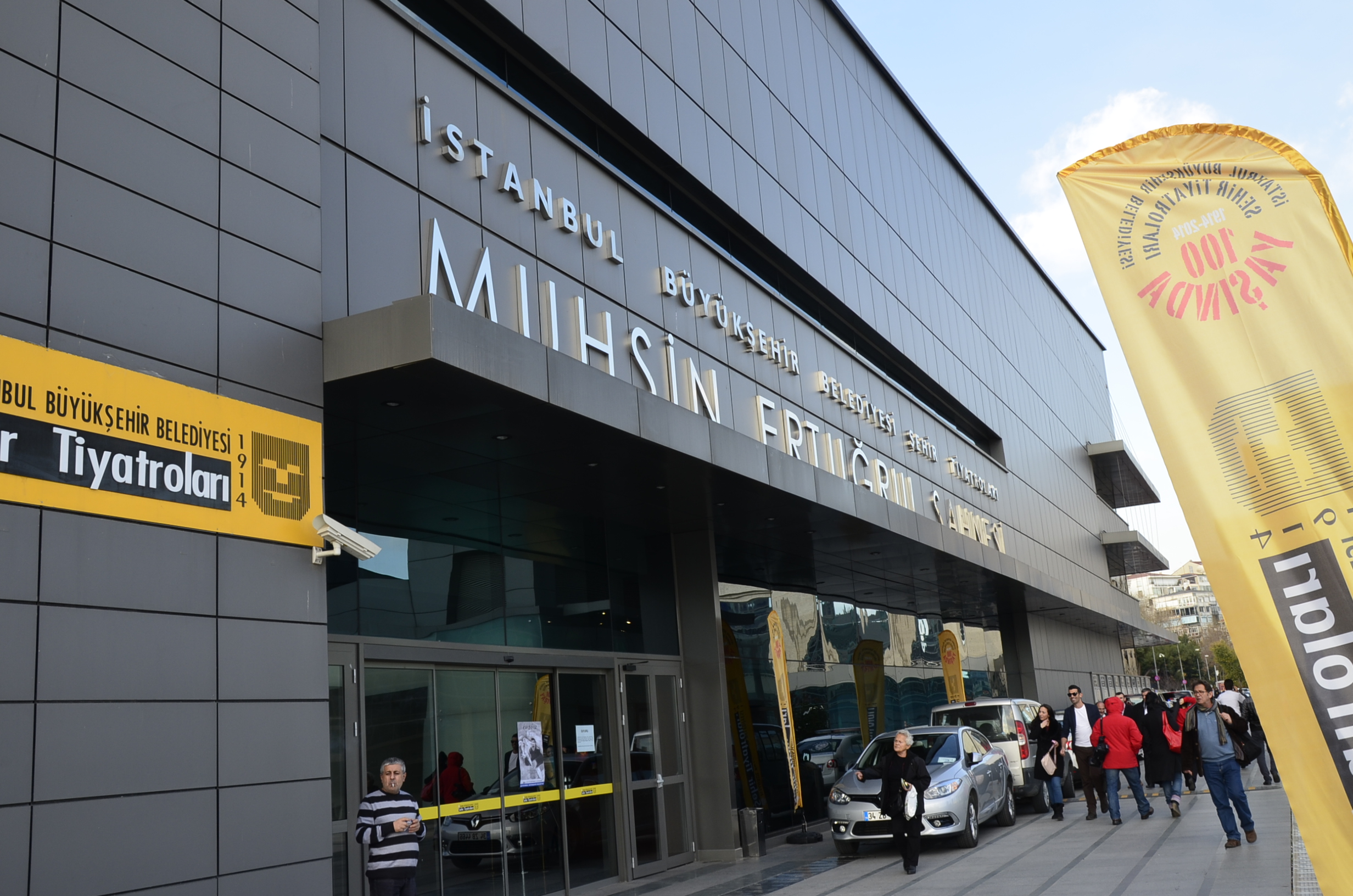
- Harbiye Muhsin Ertuğrul Stage in Şişli, Istanbul, Turkey.

- Location of Harbiye Muhsin Ertuğrul Stage in Istanbul.
- Address: Harbiye Gümüş Cad. 3 Şişli, Istanbul; Turkey
- Coordinates: 41.046111°N 28.988333°E
- Owner: Istanbul Metropolitan Municipality
- Operator: Şehir Tiyatroları (City Theatres)
- Capacity: 598
- Type: Local authority

Construction
- Opened: 1964; 62 years ago
- Reopened: January 14, 2010; 16 years ago

Website
- www.ibb.gov.tr/sites/sehirtiyatrolari/tr-tr/sayfalar/harbiyemuhsinertugrulsahnesi.aspx

Harbiye Muhsin Ertuğrul Stage (Turkish: Harbiye Muhsin Ertuğrul Sahnesi) is a theatre venue in the Harbiye neighborhood of Şişli district in Istanbul, Turkey. It is owned by Istanbul Metropolitan Municipality and operated by its City Theatres (Şehir Tiyatroları) division. The theatre is named in honor of the Turkish stage actor and director Muhsin Ertuğrul (1892-1979).

The Muhsin Ertuğrul theatre was initially opened in 1964. The old building at the same location was partly demolished to make place for a bigger and modern one. Groundbreaking took place on February 14, 2008. The construction cost ₺17 million, and the theatre was reopened on January 14, 2010. It is adjacent to Istanbul Congress Center, a multi-level complex, which was built to host the 2009 IMF and World Bank Group Annual Meeting.

The old theatre had lowered its stage curtain after a performance of Keşanlı Ali Destanı (Keşanlı Ali’s Epic), a musical play by the renowned Turkish playwright Haldun Taner (1915-1986). It was also the same musical play that was staged on the reopening of the new theatre venue.

== Facilities ==
The covered area of the new theatre building is double so big as of the old building. It has a 400 m^{2} (4,300 sq ft) foyer.

The heatre has a rotating stage and an orchestra pit. Six dressing rooms for actors, two rehearsal rooms, and rooms for lighting and sound personnel are incorporated in the building. The auditorium has a seating capacity of 598.

The theater is connected with Istanbul Congress Center, and with a passage to Istanbul Lütfi Kırdar Convention and Exhibition Center across the street, which is closed to traffic. A car park capable of 1,000 vehicles is available under the building.

== Past productions ==
- Keşanlı Ali Destanı (Keşanlı Ali’s Epic) by Haldun Taner (2008, 2010)
- Yaşar Ne Yaşar Ne Yaşamaz by Aziz Nesin Musical (Dec 11-15, 2013)
- Ali Baba ve Kırk Haramiler (Ali Baba and the Forty Thieves) by Can Doğan (Dec 14-15, 2013)
- Lysistrata (Kadınlar Da Savaşırsa) by Aristophanes (Dec 18-22, 2013)
- Pırtlatan Bal by Aziz Nesin Children's (Dec 21-29, 2013)
- Şark Dişçisi by Hagop Baronian Musical (Dec 25-29, 2013)

== See also ==
- Bahçeşehir Muhsin Ertuğrul Theatre, a theatre venue in Bahçeşehir, Başakşehir, Istanbul
- Muhsin Ertuğrul Stage, a theatre venue in Mamak, Ankara
