= Neyyire Neyir =

Turkish actress (1902–1943)

- Born: Münire Eyüp; 1902; Istanbul, Ottoman Empire
- Died: 13 February 1943 (aged 40–41); Istanbul, Turkey
- Resting place: Zincirlikuyu Cemetery, Istanbul
- Education: American College for Girls Istanbul
- Occupations: Stage and movie actress, art writer
- Years active: 1923–1943
- Spouse(s): Muhsin Ertuğrul (m. 1929–1943)

Neyyire Neyir (née Münire Eyüp, 1902 – 13 February 1943), also known by her real name Münire Eyüp Ertuğrul, was a Turkish stage and movie actress as well as an art writer. She is remembered as one of the first ever Muslim movie actresses in Turkey debuting in 1923. She was married to actor and director Muhsin Ertuğrul.

== Personal life ==
She was born in 1902 as Münire Eyüp at Istanbul, Ottoman Empire. She graduated from Teachers' School for Girls in Istanbul, and then attended the American College for Girls Istanbul without finishing it. During her time at the college, she was a member of the school's theatre club.

In 1929, she married Muhsin Ertuğrul (1892–1979), whom she met during her first movie performance in 1923.

Neyyire Neyir was hospitalized in October 1942 due to intense chest pain she experienced during a rehearsal on stage. The heart disease caused her death at the age of 41 on 13 February 1943. She was laid to rest at the Zincirlikuyu Cemetery in Istanbul. Neyire Neyir was survived by her husband Muhsin Ertuğrul.

== Career ==
Her professional acting career began when she featured in the 1923 movie Ateşten Gömlek (The Daughter of Smyrna) directed by Muhsin Ertuğrul. Muhsin Ertuğrul was about to film a very popular novel written by Halide Edib Adıvar (1884–1964), which featured some dramatic events of the Turkish War of Independence (1919–1923). Adıvar, a women's rights activist, who actually participated in the Turkish War of Independence, stipulated that she would only permit her novel be filmed when the lead role is featured by a Turkish Muslim woman. In the Ottoman Empire, acting of Muslim women in movies was not allowed for reasons of religion. In all the movies, the woman roles were played by the Christian or Jewish women of minorities in Turkey. The newly married wife Bedia Muvahhit (1897–1994) of Muhsin Ertuğrul's friend accepted to perform for the lead role. For casting the supporting female role, an advertisement was published in a newspaper. The only application came from Münire Eyüp, who was still a college student. She played in the movie under the pseudonym Neyyire Neyir, and became so one of the first ever Muslim women to feature in the cinema in Turkey.

Neyyire Neyir starred in the same year also in the Muhsin Ertuğrul's next movie Kız Kulesinde Bir Facia (A Tragedy at Leander's Tower). After a brief period of acting with a theatre company in İzmir, she returned 1924 to Istanbul and joined theatre of Muhsin Ertuğrul. In later years, she performed in a movie under her real name. However, she devoted herself to stage theater.

She acted on stage of Istanbul Municipal Theatre (Ottoman Turkish: Darülbedayi), of which director Muhsin Ertuğrul was appointed. Neyyire Neyir participated in guest plays of the theatre touring in Egypt and Cyprus.

She wrote articles on the Russian literature and Russian theatre in the theatre journal Darülbedayi, which her husband established on 15 February 1930. She assumed also the post of editor-in-chief using her real name. From 1941 on, Neyyire Neyir wrote in the journal Perde ve Sahne (literally: "Curtain and Stage"), she and her husband published together.

== Starring Games ==
- Othello
- Hortlaklar
- Bora
- Aşkın Ölümü
- Kör
- Hile ve Sevgi
- Zehirli Kucak
- Suç ve Ceza
- Unutulan Adam
- Müfettiş
- Tohum
- Mum Söndü
- Hamlet
- Kafatası
- Hülleci
- Macbeth
- Ayak Takımı Arasında
- Sürtük
- Yanlışlıklar Komedyası
- Bir Adam Yaratmak

== Filmography ==
- Ateşten Gömlek (1923) as Kezban
- Kız Kulesinde Bir Facia (1923)
- Ankara Postası (1928) (under her real name)

== Legacy ==
A street in Bahçelievler district of Istanbul is named in her honor.
