= Muhsin Ertuğrul =

Turkish actor and director

- Born: 28 February 1891; Istanbul, Ottoman Empire
- Died: 29 April 1979 (aged 88); İzmir, Turkey
- Resting place: Zincirlikuyu Cemetery, Istanbul
- Years active: 1908–1978
- Spouses: Neyyire Neyir (m. 1929–1943); Handan Ertuğrul (m. 1950–1979)

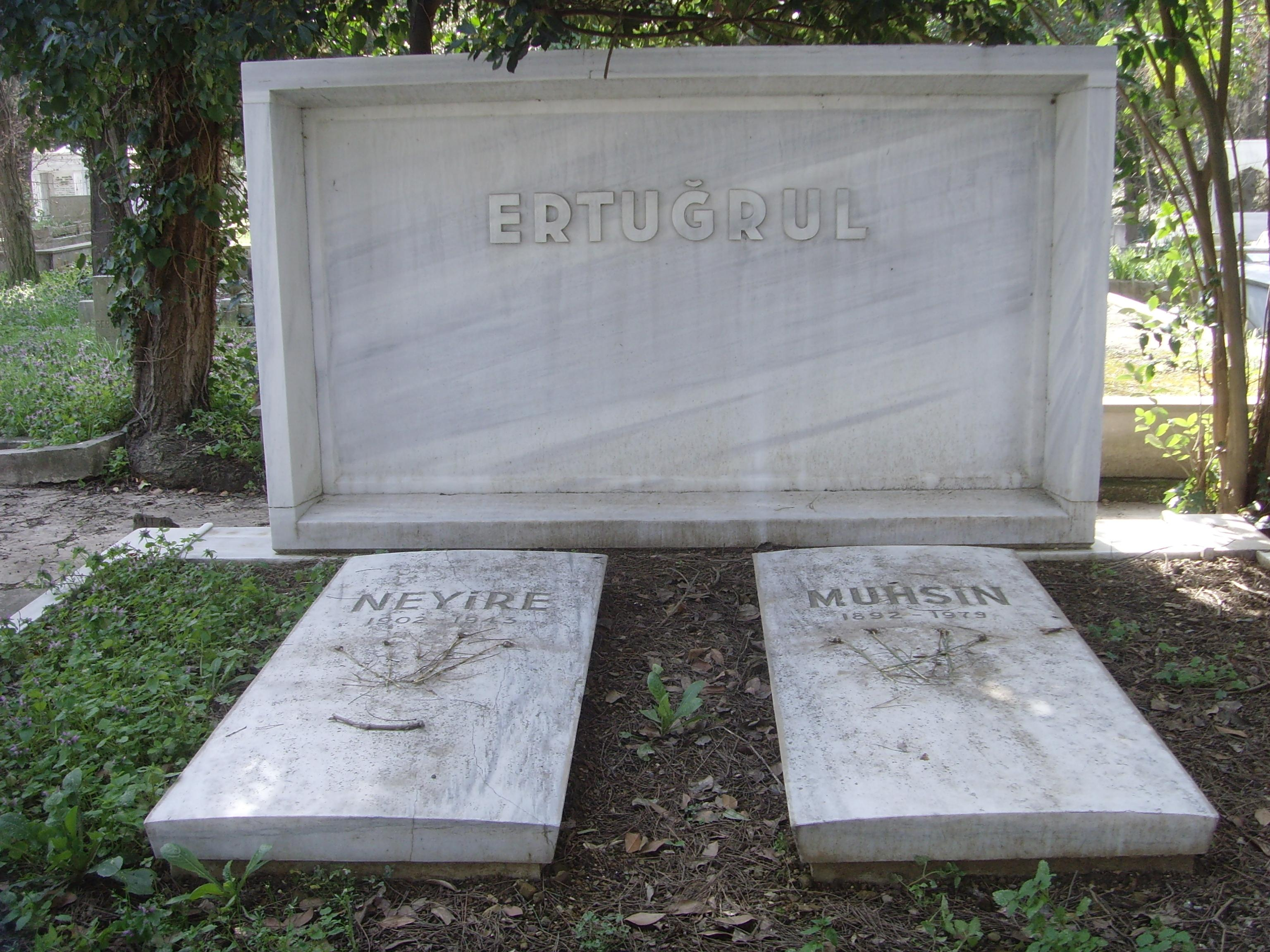
Grave of Muhsin Ertuğrul and his wife Neyyire Neyir at Zincirlikuyu Cemetery

Muhsin Ertuğrul (28 February 1892 – 29 April 1979), also known as Ertuğrul Muhsin Bey, was a Turkish actor and director.

== Life ==
His mother, Fatma Dilruh Verdrich was of German descent. His father was Hüseyin Hüsnü Paşa. Muhsin Ertuğrul made important contributions to Turkish cinema and to the westernisation of Turkish theatre, moving it away from its traditional forms. His first performance in theatre was in 1909 with the role of "Bob" in Sherlock Holmes by Arthur Conan Doyle. He ran the Darülbedayi Theatre in Istanbul from its opening in 1914. In 1932, He directed the first Turkish sound film "Bir Millet Uyanıyor" alongside Atıf Kaftan and Naşit Özcan.

He married Neyyire Neyir (née Münire Eyüp) in 1929, one of the first ever Turkish actresses, who debuted in the 1923 film Ateşten Gömlek, directed by himself. The marriage lasted until Neyyire's death in 1943. Ertuğrul then married Handan Uran (born 1927) in 1950. A stage actress, she starred in her only film, the 1953 Halıcı Kız, the first Turkish colour film, once again directed by Ertuğrul himself. She survived her husband's death in 1979.

== Death ==
Ertuğrul died of a heart attack on 29 April 1979, at the age of 87, while in İzmir following the honorary doctorate ceremony. He was buried in Zincirlikuyu Cemetery in Istanbul.

== Awards ==
Muhsin Ertuğrul was awarded an honorary doctorate by Ege University on 23 April 1979 in recognition of his contributions to the theatre and cinema of Turkey.

== Legacy ==
Three theatres in Turkey are named in his honour: the Harbiye Muhsin Ertuğrul Stage and Bahçeşehir Muhsin Ertuğrul Theatre in Istanbul and the Muhsin Ertuğrul Stage in Ankara.

== Filmography ==
=== Director ===
- Halıcı Kız (1953) (The Carpetmaker Girl)
- Evli mi bekar mı (1951)
- Kızılırmak karakoyun (1946)
- Yayla kartalı (1945) (The Plateau Eagle)
- Kıskanç (1942) (The Jealous One)
- Kahveci güzeli (1941) (The Handsome Coffee Shop-Keeper)
- Akasya palas (1940)
- Nasreddin Hoca düğünde (1940) (Nasreddin Hodja at the Wedding Feast)
- Şehvet kurbanı (1940) (The Victim of Lust)
- Tosun paşa (1939)
- Allah'ın cenneti (1939) (The Paradise of God)
- Bir kavuk devrildi (1939)
- Aynaroz kadısı (1938) (The Judge of Athos)
- Aysel Bataklı Damın Kızı (1934)
- Leblebici Horhor Ağa (1934)
- Milyon avcıları (1934)
- Cici berber (1933) (The Pretty Barber)
- Naşit dolandırıcı (1933) (Naşit, the Swindler)
- Karım beni aldatırsa (1933) (If My Wife Betrays Me)
- Kakos dromos (1933) (The Wrong Road) (USA)
- Söz bir, Allah bir (1933)
- Bir millet uyanıyor (1932) (A Nation Is Awakening)
- İstanbul sokaklarında (1931) (In the Streets of Istanbul)
- The Courier of Angola (1929)
- Kaçakçılar (1929) (The Smugglers)
- Ankara postası (1928)
- Bir sigara yüzünden (1928) (For a Cigarette)
- Laila (1927)
- Sözde kızlar (1924)
- Leblebici Horhor Ağa (1924)
- Ateşten Gömlek (1923)
- Kız Kulesinde bir facia (1923)
- Boğaziçi esrarı (1922) Nur baba (Turkey: Turkish title), (The Bosphorus Mystery) (International title)
- İstanbul'da bir facia-i aşk (1922) (A Love Tragedy In Istanbul)
- İstanbul'da ıstırap (1922)
- Die Teufelsanbeter (1920) (The Devil Worshippers)
- The Black Tulip Festival (1920) (co-director, with Marie Luise Droop)
- Samson (1919) aka Istırap (Turkey: Turkish title)

=== Actor ===
- Kıskanç (1942) (The Jealous One)
- Şehvet kurbanı (1940) (The Victim of Lust)
- The Courier of Angola (1929)
- Ankara postası (1928)
- Die Frau mit den Millionen - 1. Der Schuß in der Pariser Oper (1923)
- Ateşten gömlek (1923)
- Kız Kulesinde bir facia (1923)
- Boğaziçi esrarı (1922) Nur baba (Turkey: Turkish title), The Bosphorus Mystery (International title)
- İstanbul'da ıstırap (1922)
- Samson (1919) Istırap (Turkey: Turkish title)

== See also ==
- Muhsin Ertuğrul Stage, a theatre venue in Mamak, Ankara
- Bahçeşehir Muhsin Ertuğrul Theatre, a theatre venue in Bahçeşehir, Başakşehir, Istanbul
- Harbiye Muhsin Ertuğrul Stage, a theatre venue in Harbiye, Şişli, Istanbul
