= Darülbedayi =

The Darülbedayi was an Ottoman imperial theatre established in Istanbul in 1914. Also, It had acting education. Its history was closely linked to that of its director, the actor Muhsin Ertuğrul.
