= List of populated places in Ordu Province =

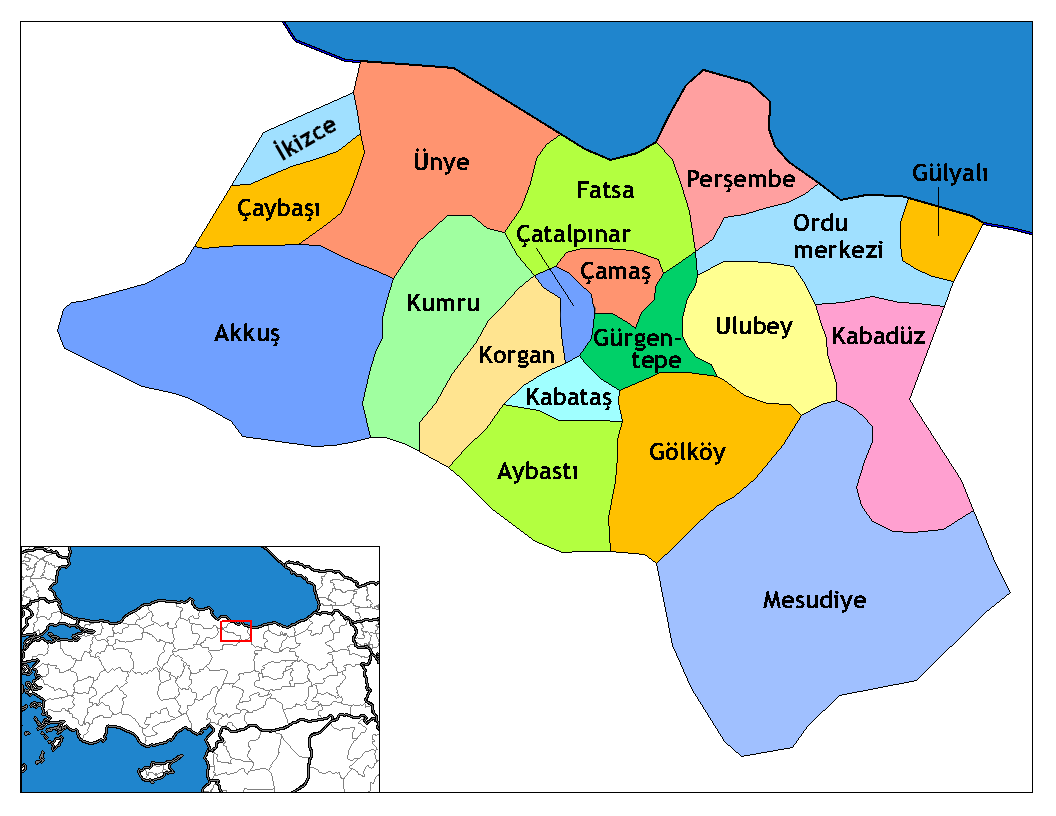
Ordu Province

Below is the list of populated places in Ordu Province, Turkey by the districts. In the following lists first place in each list is the administrative center of the district

== Ordu ==
- Ordu
- Akçatepe, Ordu
- Akkise, Ordu
- Alembey, Ordu
- Alınca, Ordu
- Alisayvan, Ordu
- Altunyurt, Ordu
- Arpaköy, Ordu
- Artıklı, Ordu
- Ataköy, Ordu
- Aydınlık, Ordu
- Bahariye, Ordu
- Bayadı, Ordu
- Bayramlı, Ordu
- Boztepe, Ordu
- Burhanettinköy, Ordu
- Cumhuriyet, Ordu
- Çavuşlar, Ordu
- Dedeli, Ordu
- Delikkaya, Ordu
- Düzköy, Ordu
- Emen, Ordu
- Erenli, Ordu
- Eskipazar, Ordu
- Eyüplü, Ordu
- Gerce, Ordu
- Gökömer, Ordu
- Gümüşköy, Ordu
- Günören, Ordu
- Güzelyalı, Ordu
- Hacılar, Ordu
- Hatipli, Ordu
- Hürriyet, Ordu
- Işıklı, Ordu
- Karaağaç, Ordu
- Karacaömer, Ordu
- Karaoluk, Ordu
- Kayabaşı, Ordu
- Kayadibi, Ordu
- Kısacık, Ordu
- Kızılhisar, Ordu
- Kovancı, Ordu
- Kökenli, Ordu
- Kurtulmuş, Ordu
- Kuylu, Ordu
- Mubarek, Ordu
- Oğmaca, Ordu
- Orhaniye, Ordu
- Ortaköy, Ordu
- Osmaniye, Ordu
- Öceli, Ordu
- Örencik, Ordu
- Övündük, Ordu
- Pelitli, Ordu
- Sağırlı, Ordu
- Saraycık, Ordu
- Şenköy, Ordu
- Şenocak, Ordu
- Terzili, Ordu
- Teyneli, Ordu
- Tikence, Ordu
- Topluca, Ordu
- Uzunisa, Ordu
- Uzunmusa, Ordu
- Yağızlı, Ordu
- Yaraşlı, Ordu
- Yemişli, Ordu
- Yeşilköy, Ordu
- Yıldızlı, Ordu
- Yukarıtepe, Ordu
- Zafer, Ordu

== Akkuş ==
- Akkuş
- Akpınar, Akkuş
- Ambargürgen, Akkuş
- Ceyhanlı, Akkuş
- Çamlıca, Akkuş
- Çavdar, Akkuş
- Çayıralan, Akkuş
- Çökek, Akkuş
- Çukurköy, Akkuş
- Dağyolu, Akkuş
- Damyeri, Akkuş
- Düğencili, Akkuş
- Esentepe, Akkuş
- Gedikli, Akkuş
- Gökçebayır, Akkuş
- Gürgenliyatak, Akkuş
- Haliluşağı, Akkuş
- Karaçal, Akkuş
- Kargı, Akkuş
- Kemikgeriş, Akkuş
- Ketendere, Akkuş
- Kızılelma, Akkuş
- Koçcuvaz, Akkuş
- Kurtboğaz, Akkuş
- Kuşçulu, Akkuş
- Külekçili, Akkuş
- Meyvalı, Akkuş
- Muratlı, Akkuş
- Ormancık, Akkuş
- Ortabölme, Akkuş
- Salman, Akkuş
- Seferli, Akkuş
- Şahinköy, Akkuş
- Tuzakköy, Akkuş
- Yeşilgüneycik, Akkuş
- Yeşilköy, Akkuş
- Yolbaşı, Akkuş
- Yukarıdüğencili, Akkuş

== Aybastı ==
- Aybastı
- Alacalar, Aybastı
- Beştam, Aybastı
- Çakırlı, Aybastı
- Hisarcık, Aybastı
- Kayabaşı, Aybastı
- Pelitözü, Aybastı
- Sarıyar, Aybastı
- Sefalık, Aybastı
- Toygar, Aybastı
- Uzundere, Aybastı
- Zaferimilli, Aybastı

== Çamaş ==
- Çamaş
- Budak, Çamaş
- Edirli, Çamaş
- Hisarbey, Çamaş
- Kocaman, Çamaş
- Saitler, Çamaş
- Söken, Çamaş

== Çatalpınar ==
- Çatalpınar
- Akkaya, Çatalpınar
- Elmaköy, Çatalpınar
- Göller, Çatalpınar
- Gündoğdu, Çatalpınar
- Karahamza, Çatalpınar
- Karahasan, Çatalpınar
- Kayatepe, Çatalpınar
- Keçili, Çatalpınar
- Madenköy, Çatalpınar
- Ortaköy, Çatalpınar
- Sayacatürk, Çatalpınar
- Şirinköy, Çatalpınar

== Çaybaşı ==
- Çaybaşı
- Akbaba, Çaybaşı
- Eğribel, Çaybaşı
- Göksu, Çaybaşı
- İçeribükü, Çaybaşı
- İlküvez, Çaybaşı
- Kapılı, Çaybaşı
- Köklük, Çaybaşı

== Fatsa ==
- Fatsa
- Ahmetler, Fatsa
- Arpalık, Fatsa
- Aslancami, Fatsa
- Aşağıardıç, Fatsa
- Aşağıtepe, Fatsa
- Aşağıyavaş, Fatsa
- Bacanak, Fatsa
- Bağlarca, Fatsa
- Bahçeler, Fatsa
- Başköy, Fatsa
- Beyceli, Fatsa
- Bolaman, Fatsa
- Bozdağı, Fatsa
- Bucaklı, Fatsa
- Buhari, Fatsa
- Bülbül, Fatsa
- Büyükkoç, Fatsa
- Çömlekli, Fatsa
- Çötelü, Fatsa
- Demirci, Fatsa
- Dereyurt, Fatsa
- Duayeri, Fatsa
- Düğünlük, Fatsa
- Eskiordu, Fatsa
- Geyikçeli, Fatsa
- Gölköy, Fatsa
- Hatipli, Fatsa
- Hıdırbeyli, Fatsa
- Hoylu, Fatsa
- Ilıca, Fatsa
- İnönü, Fatsa
- İslamdağ, Fatsa
- Kabakdağı, Fatsa
- Kaleönü, Fatsa
- Karataş, Fatsa
- Kayaca, Fatsa
- Kılavuzömer, Fatsa
- Kılıçlı, Fatsa
- Kösebucağı, Fatsa
- Kulak, Fatsa
- Küçükkoç, Fatsa
- Mehmetakif, Fatsa
- Oluklu, Fatsa
- Örencik, Fatsa
- Salihli, Fatsa
- Saraytepe, Fatsa
- Sazcılar, Fatsa
- Sefaköy, Fatsa
- Sudere, Fatsa
- Tahtabaş, Fatsa
- Tayalı, Fatsa
- Tepecik, Fatsa
- Yalıköy, Fatsa
- Yapraklı, Fatsa
- Yassıbahçe, Fatsa
- Yassıtaş, Fatsa
- Yavaş, Fatsa
- Yenidoğan, Fatsa
- Yenikent, Fatsa
- Yeniyurt, Fatsa
- Yeşilköy, Fatsa
- Yeşiltepe, Fatsa
- Yukarıardıç, Fatsa
- Yukarıbahçeler, Fatsa
- Yukarıtepe, Fatsa
- Yusuflu, Fatsa

== Gülyalı ==
- Gülyalı
- Ambarcılı, Gülyalı
- Ayrılık, Gülyalı
- Kestane, Gülyalı
- Mustafalı, Gülyalı
- Taşlıçay, Gülyalı
- Turnasuyu

== Gürgentepe ==
- Gürgentepe
- Alaseher, Gürgentepe
- Bahtiyarlar, Gürgentepe
- Tikenlice, Gürgentepe
- Eskiköy, Gürgentepe
- Gülbelen, Gürgentepe
- Gültepe, Gürgentepe
- Hasancık, Gürgentepe
- Işıktepe, Gürgentepe
- Şirinköy, Gürgentepe
- Tepeköy, Gürgentepe
- Tuzla, Gürgentepe

== Gölköy ==
- Gölköy
- Ahmetli, Gölköy
- Akçalı, Gölköy
- Alanyurt, Gölköy
- Aydoğan, Gölköy
- Bayıralan, Gölköy
- Bulut, Gölköy
- Cihadiye, Gölköy
- Çatak, Gölköy
- Çetilli, Gölköy
- Damarlı, Gölköy
- Direkli, Gölköy
- Düzyayla, Gölköy
- Emirler, Gölköy
- Güzelyayla, Gölköy
- Güzelyurt, Gölköy
- Haruniye, Gölköy
- Hürriyet, Gölköy
- İçyaka, Gölköy
- Kale, Gölköy
- Karahasan, Gölköy
- Konak, Gölköy
- Kozören, Gölköy
- Özlü, Gölköy
- Süleymaniye, Gölköy
- Yuvapınar, Gölköy

== İkizce ==
- İkizce
- Derebaşı, İkizce
- Devecik, İkizce
- Dumantepe, İkizce
- Düzmeşe, İkizce
- Esentepe, İkizce
- Kaynartaş, İkizce
- Kervansaray, İkizce
- Kiraztepe, İkizce
- Özpınar, İkizce
- Şenbolluk, İkizce
- Yoğunoluk, İkizce

== Kabadüz ==
- Kabadüz
- Akgüney, Kabadüz
- Derinçay, Kabadüz
- Dişkaya, Kabadüz
- Esenyurt, Kabadüz
- Gelinkaya, Kabadüz
- Gümüşdere, Kabadüz
- Gülpınar, Kabadüz
- Harami, Kabadüz
- Kirazdere, Kabadüz
- Özlükent, Kabadüz
- Yeşilada, Kabadüz
- Yokuşdibi, Kabadüz

== Kabataş ==
- Kabataş
- Alankent, Kabataş
- Beylerli, Kabataş
- Kuzköy, Kabataş

== Korgan ==
- Korgan
- Aşağıkozpınar, Korgan
- Belalan, Korgan
- Beypınarı, Korgan
- Büyükakçakese, Korgan
- Çamlı, Korgan
- Çayırkent, Korgan
- Çiftlik, Korgan
- Çitlice, Korgan
- Durali, Korgan
- Karakışla, Korgan
- Koçcuğaz, Korgan
- Soğukpınar, Korgan
- Tatarcık, Korgan
- Tepealan, Korgan
- Terzili, Korgan
- Yeniköy, Korgan
- Yeşilalan, Korgan
- Yeşildere, Korgan
- Yeşilyurt, Korgan
- Yukarıkozpınar, Korgan

== Kumru ==
- Kumru
- Ağcaalantürk, Kumru
- Akçadere, Kumru
- Avdullu, Kumru
- Balı, Kumru
- Ballık, Kumru
- Çatılı, Kumru
- Derbent, Kumru
- Divanıtürk, Kumru
- Duman, Kumru
- Ergentürk, Kumru
- Esence, Kumru
- Eskiçokdeğirmen, Kumru
- Fizme, Kumru
- Gökçeli, Kumru
- Güneycik, Kumru
- Karaağaç, Kumru
- Karacalar, Kumru
- Kayabaşı, Kumru
- Konaklı, Kumru
- Kovancılı, Kumru
- Küçükakçakese, Kumru
- Ortaçokdeğirmen, Kumru
- Şenyurt, Kumru
- Tekkeköy, Kumru
- Yalnızdam, Kumru
- Yemişken, Kumru
- Yeniakçaalan, Kumru
- Yenidivan, Kumru
- Yeniergen, Kumru
- Yukarıdamlalı, Kumru

== Mesudiye ==
- Mesudiye
- Abdili, Mesudiye
- Alan, Mesudiye
- Arıcılar, Mesudiye
- Arıkmusa, Mesudiye
- Armutkolu, Mesudiye
- Arpaalan, Mesudiye
- Aşağıgökçe, Mesudiye
- Aşıklı, Mesudiye
- Balıklı, Mesudiye
- Bayırköy, Mesudiye
- Bayraklı, Mesudiye
- Beşbıyık, Mesudiye
- Beyağaç, Mesudiye
- Beyseki, Mesudiye
- Birebir, Mesudiye
- Celal, Mesudiye
- Çaltepe, Mesudiye
- Çardaklı, Mesudiye
- Çavdar, Mesudiye
- Çerçi, Mesudiye
- Çitliksarıca, Mesudiye
- Çukuralan, Mesudiye
- Darıcabaşı, Mesudiye
- Dayılı, Mesudiye
- Derebaşı, Mesudiye
- Doğançam, Mesudiye
- Dursunlu, Mesudiye
- Erikköy, Mesudiye
- Esatlı, Mesudiye
- Göçbeyi, Mesudiye
- Gülpınar, Mesudiye
- Güneyce, Mesudiye
- Güvenli, Mesudiye
- Güzelce, Mesudiye
- Güzle, Mesudiye
- Hamzalı, Mesudiye
- Herközü, Mesudiye
- Ilışar, Mesudiye
- Kale, Mesudiye
- Karabayır, Mesudiye
- Karacaören, Mesudiye
- Kavaklıdere, Mesudiye
- Kışlacık, Mesudiye
- Konacık, Mesudiye
- Mahmudiye, Mesudiye
- Musalı, Mesudiye
- Pınarlı, Mesudiye
- Sarıca, Mesudiye
- Sarıyayla, Mesudiye
- Topçam, Mesudiye
- Türkköyü, Mesudiye
- Üçyol, Mesudiye
- Yağmurlar, Mesudiye
- Yardere, Mesudiye
- Yavşan, Mesudiye
- Yeşilce, Mesudiye
- Yeşilçit, Mesudiye
- Yeveli, Mesudiye
- Yukarıgökçe, Mesudiye
- Yuvalı, Mesudiye

== Perşembe ==
- Perşembe
- Alınca, Perşembe
- Anaç, Perşembe
- Aziziye, Perşembe
- Bekirli, Perşembe
- Beyli, Perşembe
- Boğazcık, Perşembe
- Bolatlı, Perşembe
- Çamarası, Perşembe
- Çaytepe, Perşembe
- Çerli, Perşembe
- Doğan, Perşembe
- Efirli, Perşembe
- Ekinciler, Perşembe
- Gündoğdu, Perşembe
- Güzelyurt, Perşembe
- Hacılar, Perşembe
- İmeçli, Perşembe
- İstanbulboğazı, Perşembe
- Kazancılı, Perşembe
- Kırlı, Perşembe
- Kovanlı, Perşembe
- Kurtuluş, Perşembe
- Kutluca, Perşembe
- Kuyluca, Perşembe
- Medreseönü, Perşembe
- Mersin, Perşembe
- Neneli, Perşembe
- Okçulu, Perşembe
- Ortatepe, Perşembe
- Ramazan, Perşembe
- Saray, Perşembe
- Selimiye, Perşembe
- Sırakovancı, Perşembe
- Soğukpınar, Perşembe
- Şenyurt, Perşembe
- Tarlacık, Perşembe
- Tepecik, Perşembe
- Tepeköy, Perşembe
- Töngeldüzü, Perşembe
- Yarlı, Perşembe
- Yazlık, Perşembe
- Yeniköy, Perşembe
- Yeniöz, Perşembe
- Yeşilköy, Perşembe
- Yumrutaş, Perşembe

== Ulubey ==
- Ulubey
- Akoluk, Ulubey
- Akpınar, Ulubey
- Aydınlar, Ulubey
- Başçardak, Ulubey
- Belenyurt, Ulubey
- Cevizlik, Ulubey
- Çağlayan, Ulubey
- Çubuklu, Ulubey
- Doğlu, Ulubey
- Durak, Ulubey
- Elmaçukur, Ulubey
- Eymür, Ulubey
- Fındıklı, Ulubey
- Güvenköy, Ulubey
- Güvenyurt, Ulubey
- Güzelyurt, Ulubey
- Hocaoğlu, Ulubey
- Kadıncık, Ulubey
- Kalıcak, Ulubey
- Kardeşler, Ulubey
- Kıranyağmur, Ulubey
- Kirazlık, Ulubey
- Koşaca, Ulubey
- Kumanlar, Ulubey
- Kumrulu, Ulubey
- Ohtamış, Ulubey
- Oyumgürgen, Ulubey
- Ören, Ulubey
- Refahiye, Ulubey
- Şahinkaya, Ulubey
- Şekeroluk, Ulubey
- Şıhlar, Ulubey
- Uzunmahmut, Ulubey
- Yenisayaca, Ulubey
- Yukarıkızılen, Ulubey

== Ünye ==
- Ünye
- Ağıdere, Ünye
- Ataköy, Ünye
- Aydıntepe, Ünye
- Başköy, Ünye
- Beylerce, Ünye
- Cevizdere, Ünye
- Çakmak, Ünye
- Çatak, Ünye
- Çatalpınar, Ünye
- Çataltepe, Ünye
- Çınarcık, Ünye
- Çiğdem, Ünye
- Denizbükü, Ünye
- Dereköy, Ünye
- Dizdar, Ünye
- Düzköy, Ünye
- Düzsaylan, Ünye
- Elmalık, Ünye
- Erenyurt, Ünye
- Esenkale, Ünye
- Eskikızılcakese, Ünye
- Fatih, Ünye
- Göbü, Ünye
- Gölcüğez, Ünye
- Günpınarı, Ünye
- Güzelkale, Ünye
- Güzelyalı, Ünye
- Hanyanı, Ünye
- Hızabaşıgünlük, Ünye
- Hızarbaşıkumarlı, Ünye
- İnkur, Ünye
- Kadılar, Ünye
- Kale, Ünye
- Kaledibi, Ünye
- Keş, Ünye
- Killik, Ünye
- Kocuklu, Ünye
- Kuşçulu, Ünye
- Kuşdoğan, Ünye
- Nadirli, Ünye
- Nurettin, Ünye
- Ortaköy, Ünye
- Pelitliyatak, Ünye
- Pınarbaşı, Ünye
- Sahilköy, Ünye
- Saraycık, Ünye
- Sarıhalil, Ünye
- Saylan, Ünye
- Sofutepesi, Ünye
- Şenyurt, Ünye
- Taflancık, Ünye
- Taşça, Ünye
- Tekkiraz, Ünye
- Tepeköy, Ünye
- Uğurlu, Ünye
- Üçpınar, Ünye
- Yavı, Ünye
- Yaycı, Ünye
- Yaylalı, Ünye
- Yazkonağı, Ünye
- Yenikent, Ünye
- Yenikızılcakese, Ünye
- Yeniköy, Ünye
- Yeşilada, Ünye
- Yeşilkent, Ünye
- Yiğitler, Ünye
- Yüceler, Ünye

== Recent development ==
According to Law act no 6447, all Turkish provinces with a population more than 750 000, were renamed as metropolitan municipality. Furthermore, the central district was renamed Altınordu. All districts in those provinces became second level municipalities and all villages in those districts were renamed as a neighborhoods . Thus the villages listed above are officially neighborhoods of Ordu.
