= List of municipalities in Ordu Province =

This is the List of municipalities in Ordu Province, Turkey as of October 2007.

== Municipalities ==
List is sorted alphabetically A-Z, as Districts->Municipalities.

District	Municipality
Akkuş	Akkuş
Akkuş	Akpınar
Akkuş	Çayıralan
Akkuş	Kızılelma
Akkuş	Salman
Akkuş	Seferli
Aybastı	Alacalar
Aybastı	Aybastı
Aybastı	Çakırlı
Aybastı	Pelitözü
Çamaş	Çamaş
Çatalpınar	Çatalpınar
Çatalpınar	Göller
Çaybaşı	Çaybaşı
Çaybaşı	İlküvez
Fatsa	Aslancami
Fatsa	Bolaman
Fatsa	Fatsa
Fatsa	Geyikçeli
Fatsa	Hatipli
Fatsa	Ilıca
Fatsa	İslamdağ
Fatsa	Kösebucağı
Fatsa	Yalıköy
Gölköy	Alanyurt
Gölköy	Aydoğan
Gölköy	Damarlı
Gölköy	Düzyayla
Gölköy	Gölköy
Gölköy	Güzelyurt
Gölköy	Karahasan
Gülyalı	Gülyalı
Gürgentepe	Direkli
Gürgentepe	Eskiköy
Gürgentepe	Gürgentepe
Gürgentepe	Işıktepe
İkizce	Devecik
İkizce	İkizce
İkizce	Kaynartaş
İkizce	Şenbolluk
İkizce	Yoğunoluk
Kabadüz	Kabadüz
Kabadüz	Yokuşdibi
Kabataş	Alankent
Kabataş	Kabataş
Korgan	Çamlı
Korgan	Çayırkent
Korgan	Çiftlik
Korgan	Korgan
Korgan	Tepealan
Kumru	Fizme
Kumru	Kumru
Kumru	Yukarıdamlalı
Mesudiye	Mesudiye
Mesudiye	Topçam
Mesudiye	Üçyol
Mesudiye	Yeşilce
Ordu (Merkez)	Ordu
Ordu	Saraycık
Perşembe	Kırlı
Perşembe	Medreseönü
Perşembe	Perşembe
Ulubey	Ulubey
Ünye	Erenyurt
Ünye	Fatih
Ünye	Hanyanı
Ünye	İnkur
Ünye	Pelitliyatak
Ünye	Tekkiraz
Ünye	Ünye
Ünye	Yenikent
Ünye	Yeşilkent

== Changes in 2014 ==
According to Law act no 6360, belde (town) municipalities within provinces with more than 750000 population (so called Metropolitan municipalities in Turkey) were abolished as of 30 March 2014. Twenty three belde municipalities in the above list are now defunct. The list is kept for historical reference.
