= Streptomyces klenkii =

Scientific classification
- Domain: Bacteria
- Kingdom: Bacillati
- Phylum: Actinomycetota
- Class: Actinomycetia
- Order: Streptomycetales
- Family: Streptomycetaceae
- Genus: Streptomyces
- Species: S. klenkii

Binomial name
- Streptomyces klenkii Veyisoglu and Sahin 2015

Species of bacterium

Streptomyces klenkii is a bacterium species from the genus of Streptomyces which has been isolated from deep marine sediments from the Black Sea near the Ordu Province in Turkey.

== See also ==
- List of Streptomyces species
