= Topçam Dam (Ordu) =

- Location: Turkey
- Coordinates: 40.6014°N 37.7385°E
- Construction began: 1998
- Opening date: 2009

Topçam Dam (Ordu) is a dam in Ordu Province, Turkey, built between 1998 and 2009. The dam is located on Melet River, 40 km from Mesudiye district and 64 km from the Ordu city center. The development was backed by the Turkish State Hydraulic Works.

== See also ==
- List of dams and reservoirs in Turkey
