= Topçam Dam =

Topçam Dam may refer to:

- Topçam Dam (Aydın), a dam in Turkey
- Topçam Dam (Ordu), a dam in Turkey
