= İhsan Tav =

Turkish politician

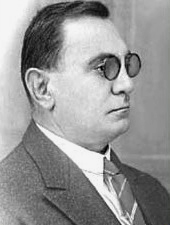

Member of the Grand National Assembly

Personal details
- Born: 1878 Hamidiye, Ottoman Empire
- Died: 7 August 1941 (aged 62–63)

İhsan Tav (1878 – 7 August 1941) was a Turkish jurist and antisemitic politician.

== Biography ==
He graduated from Istanbul University, Faculty of Law. He was the head of the Administrative Council of the period. He was married and had three children.
