= Gürgentepe =

- District and municipality
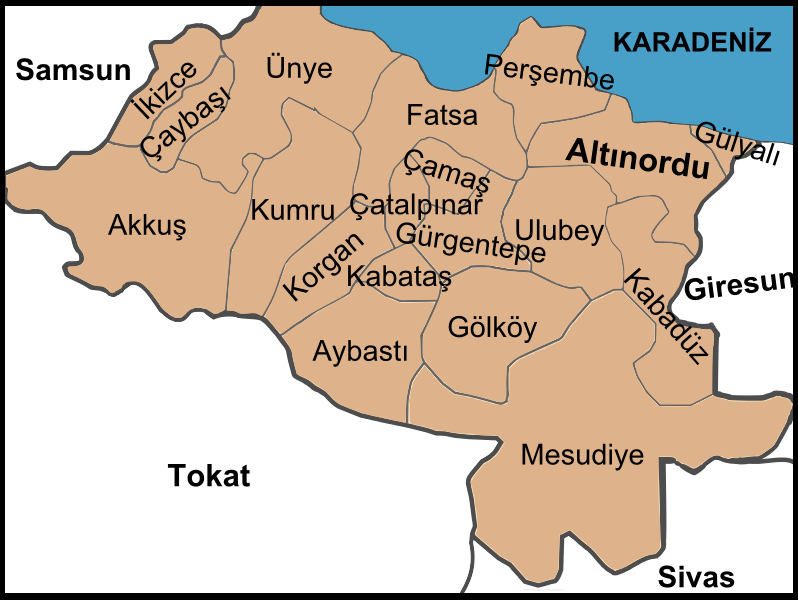
- Map showing Gürgentepe District in Ordu Province

- Location within Turkey
- Coordinates: 40°47′18″N 37°36′06″E
- Country: Turkey
- Province: Ordu

Government
  - Mayor: Cemil Çoşkun (CHP)
- Area: 185 km^{2} (71 sq mi)
- Elevation: 1,276 m (4,186 ft)
- Population (2022): 12,617
  - Density: 68.2/km^{2} (177/sq mi)
- Time zone: UTC+3 (TRT)
- Postal code: 52610
- Area code: 0452
- Climate: Cfa
- Website: www.gurgentepe.bel.tr

Gürgentepe (historically known as Hanyanı) is a settlement and district located at an elevation of approximately 1,275 meters (4072 ft) on the Ordu–Sivas highway (around the 48th km point) in Ordu Province.

The region’s climate is strongly influenced by the Black Sea, bringing high humidity and frequent rainfall throughout the year. Its elevation and mountainous terrain enhance the orographic effect, making it one of the rainiest areas in the province.

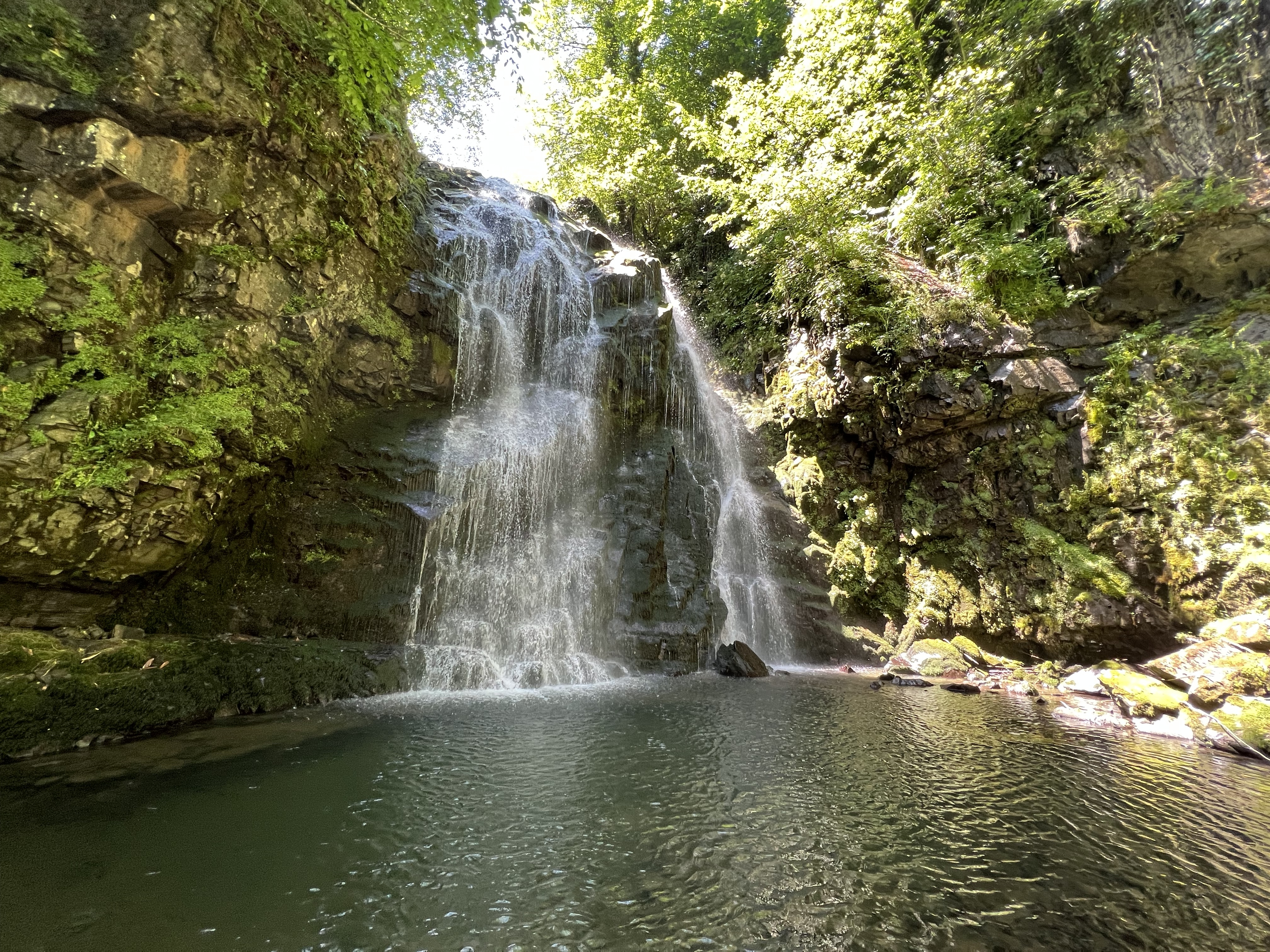

== Economy and geography ==
Gürgentepe’s economy is predominantly based on agriculture and its fertile volcanic soil, which benefit from high rainfall and natural vegetation. The humid subtropical climate is particularly favorable for hazelnut cultivation, which is the main crop in the area. Other agricultural activities include corn farming. Livestock farming, including cattle, sheep, and beekeeping (Some families also produce so-called "mad honey"), also plays a significant role in the local economy. Because the district lies at the intersection of maritime and continental climatic zones, it experiences the influence of both climate types simultaneously. This creates highly diverse microclimatic conditions across different elevations and settlements, contributing to dense, humid forested landscapes that in some areas resemble rare temperate rainforest environments. This region is also part of the broader Euxine–Colchic broadleaf forests, one of the world’s most important and least widespread temperate rainforest systems, known for its high biodiversity and rich variety of vegetation.

Despite its terrain, the district lacks significant rivers. Most waterways consist of small streams originating from the slopes, many of which carry only limited water and may dry up during longer periods without rainfall. The main streams carrying a more substantial water volume are the Tavzara Stream, Kanyaş Stream, Kara Stream, Kömüşkırak Stream, Akören Stream, and Eskiköy Stream.

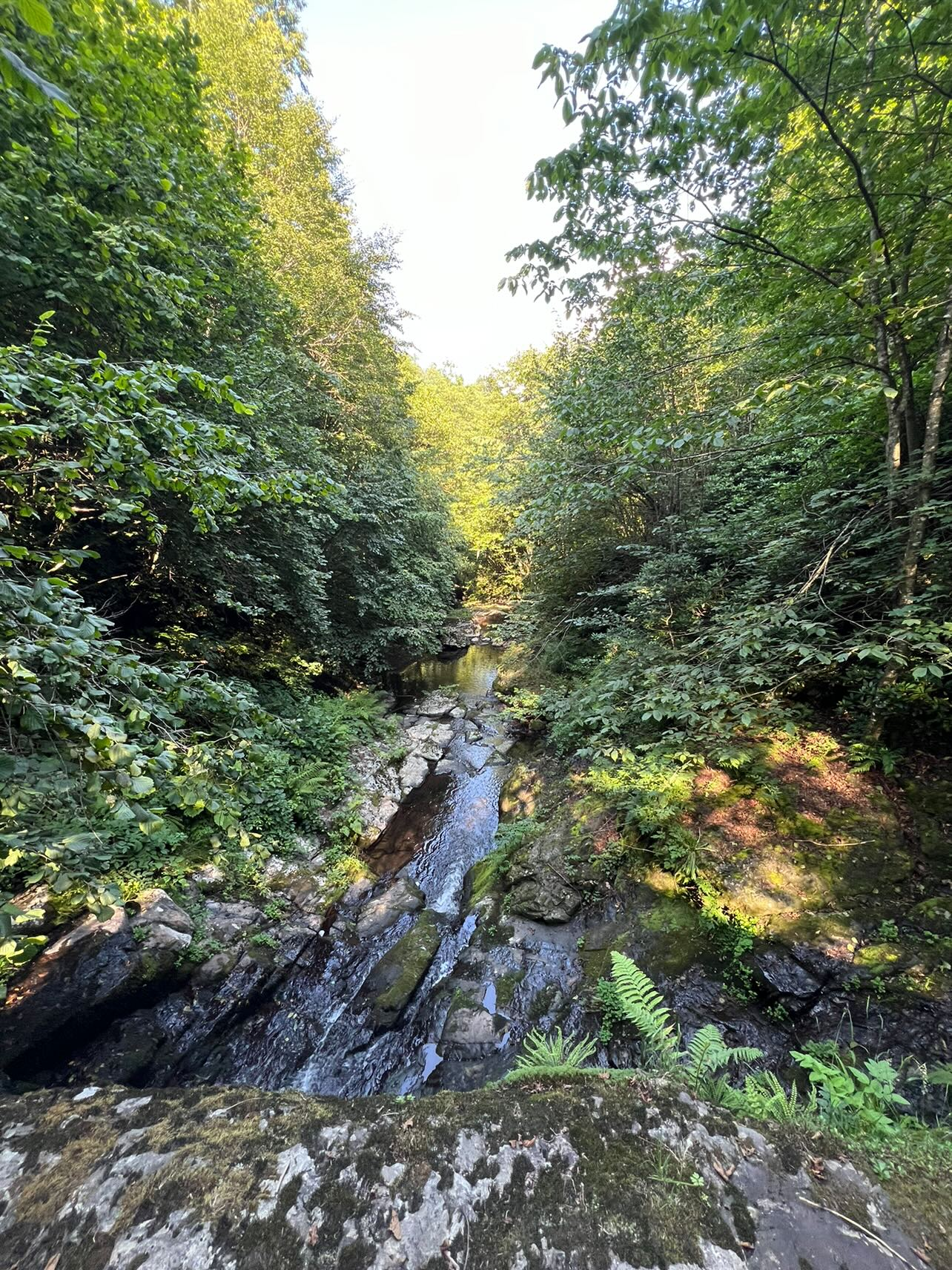

== History and culture ==
During the Ottoman period, the area consisted of small villages under the Habsamana (later Gölköy) district (nahiye). In 1455, some villages had only a few households, and growth remained slow but with the opening of the trade route/Ordu-Sivas road in 1885, the region became an important resting and trading point, where inns and marketplaces were established.

In 1955, a municipality was formed and the settlement took the name Gürgentepe (meaning “Hornbeam Hill”). In 1987, it officially became a district, and many surrounding villages (such as Direkli, Işıktepe, Okçabel, Tikenlice, Akören, and others) were incorporated into it.

Historically, Gürgentepe has been home to a mix of populations over time, including Muslim communities (mainly Bektashi Çepni Turks) In earlier historical periods, the wider Black Sea region also included non Muslim communities such as Pontic Greeks, especially before the population changes of the early 20th century.

Some villages within Gürgentepe such as Okçabel, Akören, Işıktepe, Direkli, Tikenlice, and others reflect this layered history of settlement and migration. Okçabel, for example, is associated in local history with migrant groups from Batumi following the Ottoman Russian War period, while other villages show evidence of internal migration from nearby districts such as Kürtün in Gümüşhane and Dereli in Giresun, and surrounding Black Sea regions.

After the population exchange and demographic changes of the early 20th century the region became predominantly Muslim, with both Alevi and Sunni traditions present.

== Composition and population ==
There are 23 neighbourhoods in Gürgentepe District:

- Ağızlar
- Akmescit
- Akyurt
- Akören
- Alaseher
- Bahtiyarlar
- Çatalağaç
- Cumhuriyet
- Döşek
- Eskiköy
- Göller
- Gülbelen
- Gültepe
- Hasancıkpınarı
- Işıktepe
- Muratçık
- Okçabel
- Şirinköy
- Tepeköy
- Tikenlice
- Tuzla
- Yurtseven
- Yurtyeri

== Sights and places of interest ==
In the village of Tikenlice, there are 11 carved monumental tombs.

In the village of Akmescit, there are remains of a church known as “Akkilise,” as well as the stone foundations of a madrasa dating back to the Ottoman period.

In the Dere neighborhood, stone carvings can be found along the stream, though their exact purpose remains unknown.

In Akören, a new reservoir was constructed to support agriculture, livestock, drinking water supply, and tourism, including walking paths and recreational activities such as boating. As of 20 April 2026, the reservoir has already reached its capacity of 180,000 cubic meters.

== Population ==
The district covers an area of 213 square kilometers and has a population density of 66 people per square kilometer. Like many smaller districts in Turkey, it has experienced out-migration, especially among younger residents seeking work in larger cities such as Istanbul or in larger urban centers within the province of Ordu, including Ünye, Fatsa, and Altınordu, as well as through international migration. Despite this, many families maintain strong connections to the district, particularly during the hazelnut harvest season.

Year	Total population	Male population	Female population
2023	15,543	7,937	7,606
2022	12,617	6,389	6,228
2021	13,112	6,632	6,480
2020	13,496	6,829	6,667
2019	14,100	7,184	6,916
2018	16,929	8,670	8,259
2017	13,347	6,690	6,657
2016	14,092	7,069	7,023
2015	13,821	6,854	6,967
2014	14,314	7,121	7,193
2013	16,232	8,137	8,095
2012	15,275	7,601	7,674
2011	15,960	7,886	8,074
2010	17,040	8,448	8,592
2009	16,922	8,426	8,496
2008	18,147	9,005	9,142
2007	20,098	10,071	10,027
