= Kumru, Ordu =

Kumru
- District and municipality
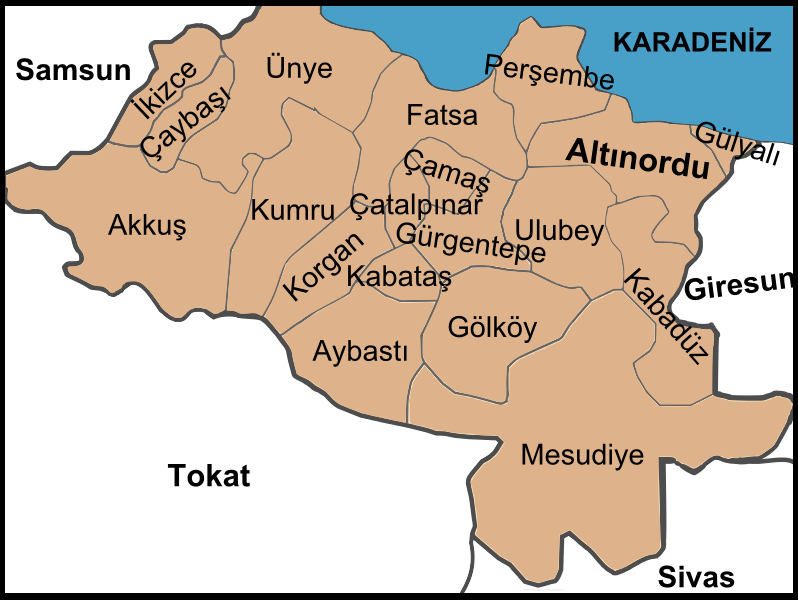
- Map showing Kumru District in Ordu Province

- Location within Turkey
- Coordinates: 40°52′28″N 37°15′50″E
- Country: Turkey
- Province: Ordu

Government
  - Mayor: Yusuf Yalçuva (AKP)
- Area: 296 km^{2} (114 sq mi)
- Elevation: 470 m (1,540 ft)
- Population (2022): 28,436
  - Density: 96.1/km^{2} (249/sq mi)
- Time zone: UTC+3 (TRT)
- Postal code: 52800
- Area code: 0452
- Climate: Cfb
- Website: www.kumru.bel.tr

Kumru is a municipality and district of Ordu Province, Turkey. Its area is 296 km^{2}, and its population is 28,436 (2022). The town lies at an elevation of 470 m (1,542 ft).

== Geography ==
Kumru is a small, remote town sandwiched between two mountains, 33 km inland from the Black Sea coast. Kumru is located approximately thirty-five kilometers southwest of Fatsa. The distance to Ordu is seventy kilometers. It borders four cities and towns: Korgan, Akkuş, Fatsa, Ünye, and Niksar. Ortaca which is locally known as Gebekse is a village of Kumru. Ortaçokdeğirmen which got its name from the mills built on the rivers is another village of Kumru. It is located on the sides of Canik mountains and about 15 minutes to Ericek plateau where mountain strawberry is naturally grown.

== Composition ==
There are 40 neighbourhoods in Kumru District:

- Ağcaalantürk
- Akçadere
- Avdullu
- Ayvalı
- Balı
- Ballık
- Çatılı
- Demircili
- Derbent
- Dereköy
- Divantürk
- Duman
- Ergentürk
- Erikçeli
- Esence
- Eskiçokdeğirmen
- Fatih
- Fizme
- Gökçeli
- Güneycik
- Kadıncık
- Karaağaç
- Karacalar
- Karacalı
- Kayabaşı
- Konaklı
- Kovancılı
- Küçükakçakese
- Kurtuluş
- Ortaca
- Ortaçokdeğirmen
- Samur
- Şenyurt
- Tekkeköy
- Yalnızdam
- Yemişken
- Yeniakçaalan
- Yenidivan
- Yeniergen
- Yukarıdamlalı
