= Aşağıgökçe, Mesudiye =

Aşağıgökçe, Ordu in Mesudiyeis a village in the province.

== History ==
There is no information about the origin of the name of the village. The former name of the village 'green', meaning that a Faldaca'dır.A former Greek is a village. Greek s i was called by FALDACA-İ SÜFLA with. Mesudiye has also been referred to as the village of Faldaca Down Faldaca because of two. The new name of the village is Aşağıgökçe.Aşağıgökçe village The Turks 1775–1800 is said in the public as they settled down. Living here Greek s exchange results are not returned to their countries upon their request to leave our village.

== Population ==
-	Year	population	-	2012	49	-	2011	55	-	2000	75	-	1990	109	-	1985	138

Rural people usually have migrated to Istanbul.
