= Tepealan =

- Neighbourhood
- Location in Turkey
- Coordinates: 40°45′N 37°18′E
- Country: Turkey
- Province: Ordu
- District: Korgan
- Elevation: 660 m (2,170 ft)
- Population (2022): 2,534
- Time zone: UTC+3 (TRT)
- Postal code: 52700
- Area code: 0452

Tepealan is a neighbourhood of the municipality and district of Korgan, Ordu Province, Turkey. Its population is 2,534 (2022). Before the 2013 reorganisation, it was a town (belde). It is situated 13 kilometres (8.1 mi) south of Korgan and 50 kilometres (31 mi) from Ordu.

In ancient ages, the area around Tepealan was quite populated because of the iron mines around. During the Ottoman Empire era, Turks as well as Greeks and Armenians lived in Tepealan. After the Russo-Turkish War (1877-1878), Moslem Georgian refugees were also settled in the village. In the 20th century, according to the Population exchange agreement between Turkey and Greece, the Christian population was replaced by a Muslim population from Greece. In 1974, Tepealan was declared a seat of township.
