= Alankent =

- Neighbourhood
- Location in Turkey
- Coordinates: 40°44′49″N 37°23′49″E
- Country: Turkey
- Province: Ordu
- District: Kabataş
- Elevation: 815 m (2,674 ft)
- Population (2022): 454
- Time zone: UTC+3 (TRT)
- Postal code: 52520
- Area code: 0452

Alankent (former Yakacık) is a neighbourhood of the municipality and district of Kabataş, Ordu Province, Turkey. Its population is 454 (2022). Before the 2013 reorganisation, it was a town (belde). It is situated in the mountainous area of Black Sea Region. The distance to Kabataş is 8 kilometres (5.0 mi).

Up to 11th century the area around the town was a part of Hittites, Achaemenid Empire, Macedonian Empire, Roman Empire and Byzantine Empire. In 1083, it was incorporated into Danishment realm and in the second half of the 12th century it was captured by the Seljuks. After the chaotic era following the Mongol invasion it was captured by Hacıemmioğlu of Canik Beylik. In 1427, Yorgüç Pasha of the Ottoman Empire annexed the region to Ottoman realm. In 1967 it was declared a seat of township. In 1967 Alankent was declared a seat of township.
