= İkizce =

- District and municipality
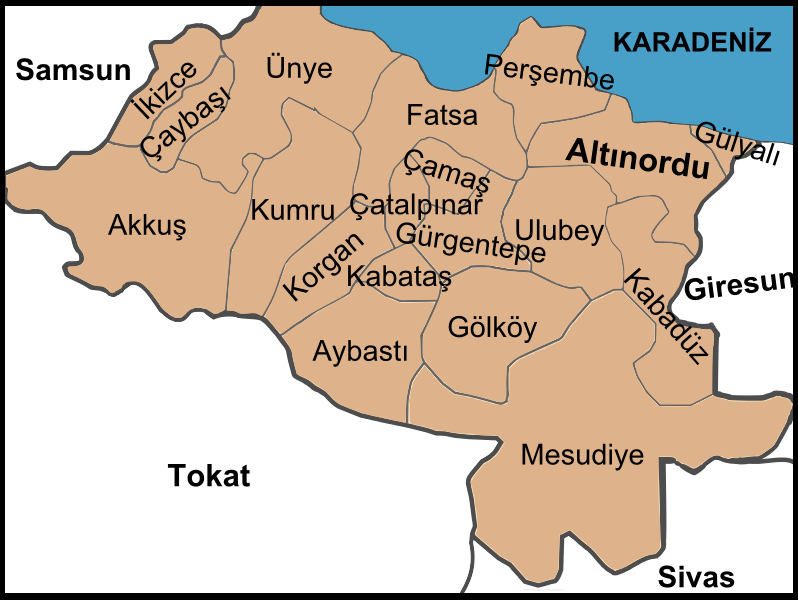
- Map showing İkizce District in Ordu Province

- Location within Turkey
- Coordinates: 41°03′11″N 37°04′37″E
- Country: Turkey
- Province: Ordu

Government
  - Mayor: Osman Kaygı (MHP)
- Area: 148 km^{2} (57 sq mi)
- Elevation: 150 m (490 ft)
- Population (2022): 13,276
  - Density: 89.7/km^{2} (232/sq mi)
- Time zone: UTC+3 (TRT)
- Area code: 0452
- Climate: Cfb
- Website: www.ikizce.bel.tr

İkizce, formerly Laleli Mabeyceli, is a municipality and district of Ordu Province, Turkey. Its area is 148 km^{2}, and its population is 13,276 (2022). The town lies at an elevation of 150 m (492 ft).

İkizce is an agricultural district, the main crop is hazelnuts.

== History ==
The place which is known as İkizce today dates back to the Empire of Trebizond (1204–1461). İkizce is supposed to have been conquered by Taceddinoğulları Principality which was situated in the centre of Tokat, Niksar.

İkizce had been called as "Laleli" till 1957. After the enterprises of the residents in the region, it has begun to be called as İkizce. The main reason why the region is called İkizce is the fact that a huge river divides the town into two similar parts by passing through town. Or else, the huge river which the two parts conjoin gives the name of this small town. When researched deeply in the history of Laleli, it is assumed that a principality called Lalaoğulları, which had dominated here, gave its name. Supposing that the development of Laleli was completed during the Ottoman Emperor period, the name of the town was come across in Tulip Age. Lala Pasha had already accommodated in this town while he was in war-time.

The Old Mosque accepted as holy and having no definite information about how and when it was built. The mosque is decorated with tulip figures. In İkizce, the Greek people, Armenians and the Turkish people lived together in the peace-time until 1920. However, they were forced to migrate because of the political conditions of that time. The bridge known as Bridge Keriş was built by Greeks in 1896.

== Composition ==
There are 32 neighbourhoods in İkizce District:

- Ağcaalan
- Aşağı Kaynartaş
- Aşağıkarlıtepe
- Başönü
- Beylerce
- Bolluk
- Derebaşı
- Devecik
- Diyek
- Dumantepe
- Düzmeşe
- Düzpelit
- Enağızlı
- Esentepe
- Fatih
- Gaziler
- Kale
- Kervansaray
- Kiraztepe
- Kocaman
- Kurtköy
- Kurtluca
- Merkez
- Özpınar
- Şentepe
- Seymenli
- Tombaşlı
- Yenice
- Yoğunoluk
- Yukarı Kaynartaş
- Yukarıkarlıtepe
- Yunuskırığı

== Geographical situation and conditions ==
İkizce is 30 km far away from Ünye and it is situated on the 15th km of Ünye–Samsun Road. On the south way of Akçay Bridge and 15 km far from the coast road, İkizce is a small town settled on the skirt of a mountain. İkizce coastal road is 15 km long and is completely concrete. The town is between 41 and 42 latitude and 36–37 longitude. Akçay is on the north part of İkizce, Akkuş exists on the south, Terme exists on the west and Çaybaşı on the east. The survey is 140 square kilometres (54 sq mi) and 121 people per square. İkizce constitutes 18 of ten thousands. The town is 130 m high above the sea level; however, the villages are more mountainous.

The natural plantations in forest and tree types are: chestnut, hornbeam, oak, red tree. The town is under the effect of the Black Sea climate. The summers are hot; the winters are snowy and cold.

The Akçay River divides the town into two parts. It is fed by two different rivers: Kocaman stream stems from the eastern side of Kızlar Plateau, it passes through Devecik and Yoğunoluk towns and falls down over Kocaman and Özpınar ending in İkizce. This stream conjoins in Adalar territory and by passing thorough town it is poured into the Black Sea with the name of Akçay River.

The River Akçay is called Dereiçi. The two sides of the town are joined by a bridge over the river. The river itself is raised by the melting of the snows during the spring, but then the level falls during the summer. It is home to various types of fish, including Kasnak, Bıyıklı, Karabalık and Alabalık in Devecik and Yoğunoluk.

There is an open bazaar in the town on Tuesdays. Moreover, the streets of the town are decorated by the concrete floors. The centre of the town is joined to the other towns and villages by several road and paths. There are connections to the town via Akkuş, Ünye and Terme.

== Transportation ==
İkizce is 30 km from Ünye and it is situated on the 15th km of Ünye- Samsun road. On the south way of Akçay Bridge and 15 km far from the coast road, İkizce is a small town settled on the skirt of a mountain.

There is a bus in every hour to İkizce from Ünye and it takes 35 or 40 minutes to reach the town centre.

== Sport ==
Facilities for sports activities are limited, although there is a stadium for football and school facilities are used for volleyball and basketball.

== Culture and tourism ==
=== The Old Mosque (The Tulipped Mosque) ===
Although it is not clear by whom and when it was built, there are a lot of assumptions about how it had been built. The wood used to cover the complete surface of the mosque is made from a special type of tree called "Pelit". The wood of the building was supplied from the town of Ünye, Çatak Village Düzpelit District. In 1994, the scientific team led by Professor Peter Ian Kuniholm from American Cornell University found out that the mosque was built 400–500 years ago; it was obvious by the trees used in the structure of the building.

According to the assumptions the construction of the mosque had started in İkizce Laleli District, the basic of the mosque had not been found in the previous place. Surprisingly the building was found on the today's place. Then people took it the previous place but next day the same occasion repeated itself. In order to understand the reason behind the event some people watched the mosque during the night. These people claimed that some unknown people were carrying the mosque on huge timbers; some of those people were setting up the basic part of the mosque. After these interesting events the place where the mosque would be situated became clear and it was built on today's place.

According to another assumption the mosque was constructed in the tulip age is supported by the fact that the mosque is decorated by tulip figures. It has been said that the mosque was larger before it had been decorated as smaller and it has been said that the holed tiles covering the roof of the mosque are carried from Gençağa Castle. The rest of the timber was used to make a small cottage for the voyagers but, while the mosque was restored the cottage was demolished. Despite its age, the mosque has remained in relatively good condition.

The stone path passing in front of the mosque is the oldest way of the town. The door of the mosque having two wings has attracted the attention of many art historians. The tulip figure carved on the door is quite attractive. The pictures of sail carved on the wall of the mosque and the other carved motifs do not represent the history of the mosque because they were probably carved afterwards. The inside decoration of the mosque is relatively plain. Apart from its architectural features the old mosque has always been remembered with honor and respect since it served for many years with its mystery. The garden of the old mosque is full of martyr cemeteries as ancient as the old mosque. Consequently, it is one of the most holy places where people gather to pray for rain during summer months and it said that those praying were never in vain.

=== Şahinkaya ===
Şahinkaya, situated in Gaziler District of İkizce, is a high steep natural granite rock 3 km away from İkizce and it is on the southeastern side of Gaziler District.

It is on the east of Gaziler District. There are some man-made and natural caves inside the rock. The place is named Şahinkaya since hawks, eagles, vultures, and ravens are living there.

=== Gençağa Castle ===
The castle; only 2.4 km of the way is asphalt and 6.8 km away from the town centre being in the borders of Karlıtepe, is composed of two parts.

The main first part constitutes the residential area of Ağa (the castle commander). The half of north and northeast of the rock mass being about 60 m in height is enclosed with a 2 m thickness of hewn stone-made rampart.

The door to entrance is 30 m high on the rock mass and can be reached after 69 steps of stairs. There is a room on the left side of the entry door which is 6 m high and 3 m wide. The stones of other rooms and parts were taken by peasants to build their own settlements and the area, enclosed by ramparts, turned into a meadow place. Beyond this residential area 30 km, there are five wells on a sharp hillside. It is understood that the wells connected by carving canals were used as cisterns. The first big well hole is narrow and the bottom is wide; throwing a stone to the bottom it echoes as copper so it is named Copper Well within the community.

For many years treasure seekers has made many excavations to reach the coppers but all damaged structure of the castle. The second part of the castle consists of many rough and sharp rocks. There is a well 6–7 m high; its top part is narrow and the bottom part is very wide. There was bones and bone dust till the near times in that well so it is named Bone Well. According to the assumptions it had been used as prison.

It is said that Gençağa Castle was built by Feudal Lord Gençağa who was very rich and had many soldiers. Surrounded by his enemies, Gençağa left the castle with seven mules loaded with gold and while he was escaping, he succeeded in saving his treasure by hiding away it underground when the mules became exhausted. According to these rumors treasure seekers are prospecting for gold.

=== Cin Grinder ===
According to research, the Cin Grinder was built by the Greeks but the date of construction is uncertain. It is on the 17 km of the way of İkizce-Devecik. It is also called Us Grinder. The Cin Grinder is on the River Diyek between Çaybaşı-İlküvez and İkizce-Devecik.

The name comes from a legend. Residents believe that demons invaded the grinder. It is isolated from the village. At first the grinder was made of wood but as a result of flood in 1970 it was damaged and was rebuilt of concrete.

=== Education ===
The District Administration of Public Education was set up on 24 October 1991. There are a public education center, a directory of guest house of teachers, 2 high schools (Yoğunoluk Multi Programmed School), 7 primary schools and 14 united-class primary schools. There are 2813 primary school students, 243 high school students in the district. There is a YİBO (Yoğunoluk Boarding School). It has 96 male boarders. There is a rehabilitation center (Laleli Private Rehabilitation Center) with 115 students. There is a study center which has 180 students.

The students are transported from 39 primary schools and village to (Terme Evci Primary School, Terme Töngellibel Primary School, Terme Sakarlı Primary School, Terme Dumantepe Primary School. Totally there are 11 primary schools like this. Lunch is also given to 1106 students in İkizce, Kurtluca, Şenbolluk, Kaynartaş, Devecik, Selahattin Tiryaki and Yoğunoluk boarding school.
