= Salman, Ordu =

Salman
- Neighbourhood
- Location in Turkey
- Coordinates: 40°51′N 36°48′E
- Country: Turkey
- Province: Ordu
- District: Akkuş
- Elevation: 1,160 m (3,810 ft)
- Population (2022): 1,877
- Time zone: UTC+3 (TRT)
- Postal code: 52950
- Area code: 0452

Salman is a neighbourhood of the municipality and district of Akkuş, Ordu Province, Turkey. Its population is 1,877 (2022). Before the 2013 reorganisation, it was a town (belde). It is situated in the mountainous area of Black Sea Region.

According to town page, Salman was founded by Chepni people, a Turkmen tribe. It was named after Selman Pasha who was a commander of Danishmends (11-12th century) After the disintegration of Seljuks of Turkey, the area around the settlement was captured by the beylik (principality) of Hacıemiroğulları (see Beyliks of Canik). But in the 15th century it was incorporated into Ottoman realm. In 1989 it was declared a seat of township. The town is surrounded by forests . In the limited agricultural land hazelnut, corn and kale are among the main crops. Beehiving and carpet weaving are other economic activities.
