= Turnasuyu =

- Neighbourhood
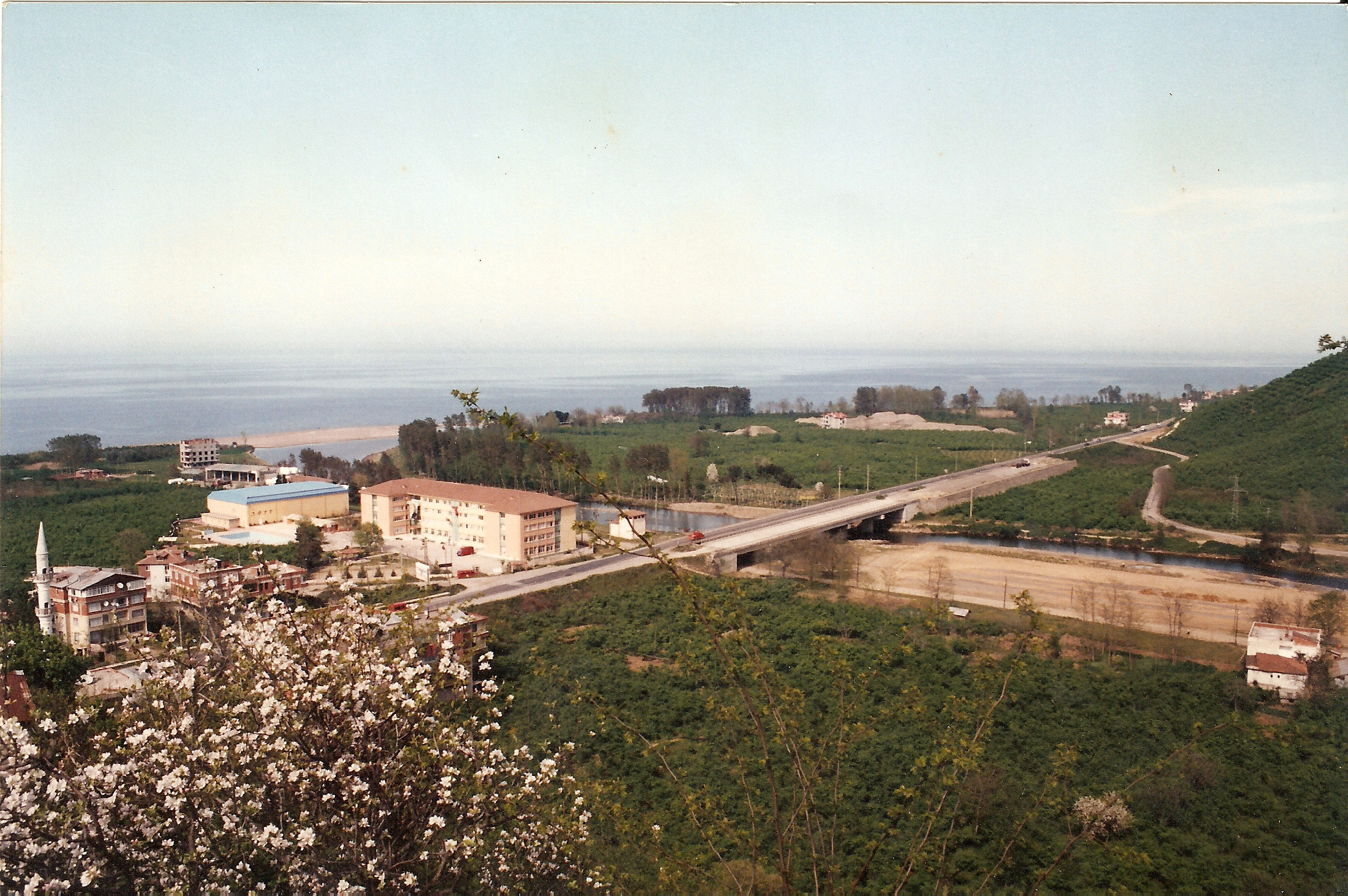

- Location within Turkey
- Coordinates: 40.9770°N 37.9943°E
- Country: Turkey
- Province: Ordu
- District: Gülyalı
- Population (2022): 2,490
- Time zone: UTC+3 (TRT)

Turnasuyu is a neighbourhood of the municipality and district of Gülyalı, Ordu Province, Turkey. Its population is 2,490 (2022). It is a coastal village, which takes its name from the nearby stream of Turna.

== Population ==
Historical population
Year	Pop.	±% p.a.
1990	1,317	—
1997	2,105	+6.93%
2007	2,229	+0.57%
2012	2,226	−0.03%
2017	2,318	+0.81%
2022	2,490	+1.44%
Source: 1990 census, 1997 census and TÜIK (2007-2022)

== Headmen ==
Headmen, by year elected:-

2009 - Ahmet ALBAYRAK
2009 - Muharrem KILIÇ
1999 - Refik KOYUN
1989 - Hayati AKTÜRK
1987 - Mustafa GÜNER
1973 - A. Burhan AYDIN
1967 - Hüseyin ERDAŞ
1966 - Cevat ATASEVER
1963 - Ahmet ÇİÇEK
1938 - Kasım ÇELEBİ
1935 - Hüseyin YILMAZ
(na) - Molla Ahmet AKTÜRK
(na) - Rüşan ERDAŞ
1895 - Hacı Mehmet (KÖKSAL)
1873 - Hüseyin Çavuş (AKKÖSE)
