= Çamaş =

- District and municipality
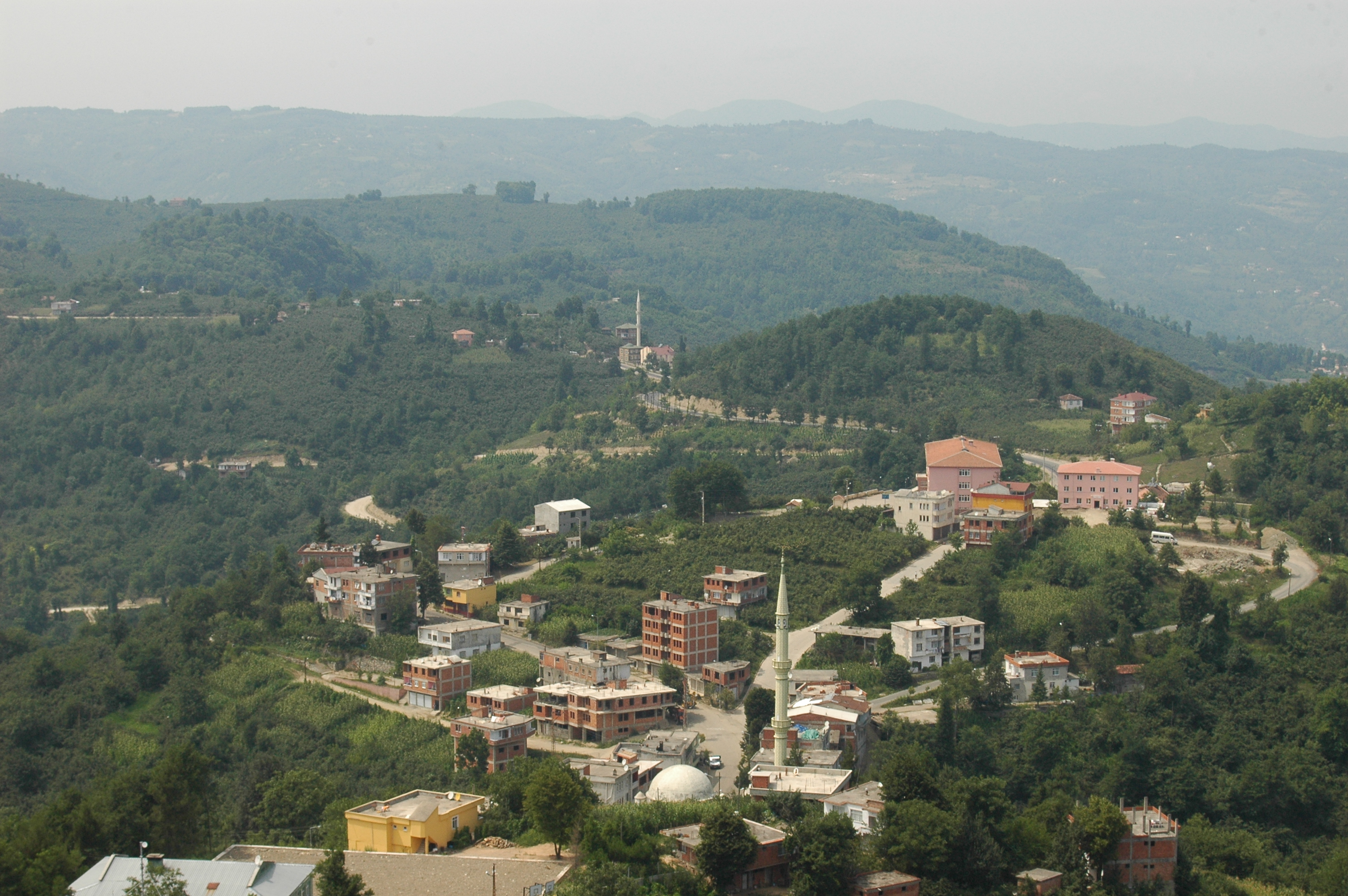

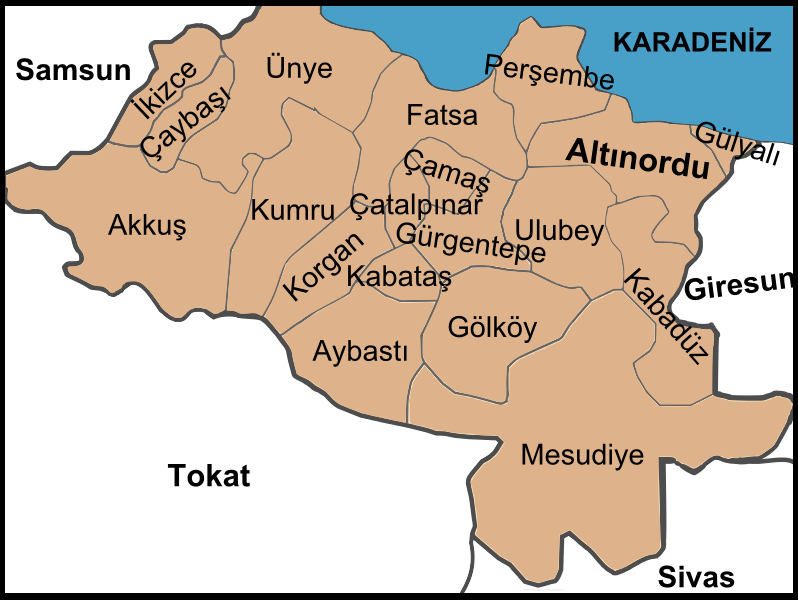
- Map showing Çamaş District in Ordu Province

- Location within Turkey
- Coordinates: 40°54′09″N 37°31′41″E
- Country: Turkey
- Province: Ordu

Government
  - Mayor: Leyla Çıtır (CHP)
- Area: 81 km^{2} (31 sq mi)
- Elevation: 590 m (1,940 ft)
- Population (2022): 8,211
  - Density: 100/km^{2} (260/sq mi)
- Time zone: UTC+3 (TRT)
- Postal code: 52430
- Area code: 0452
- Climate: Cfb
- Website: www.camas.bel.tr

Çamaş is a municipality and district of Ordu Province, Turkey a historical Laz settlement. Its area is 81 km^{2}, and its population is 8,211 (2022). The town lies at an elevation of 590 m (1,936 ft).

== Composition ==
There are 23 neighbourhoods in Çamaş District:

- Akköy
- Akpınar
- Budak
- Burhangüneyi
- Çavuşbaşı
- Danışman
- Edirli
- Giden
- Gümüşlü
- Hisarbey
- Kemalpaşa
- Kestaneyokuşu
- Kocaman
- Örmeli
- Sakargeriş
- Sarıyakup
- Söken
- Sucuali
- Taşoluk
- Tepeli
- Uzunali
- Yenimahalle
- Yeşilvadi
