= Gülyalı =

- District and municipality
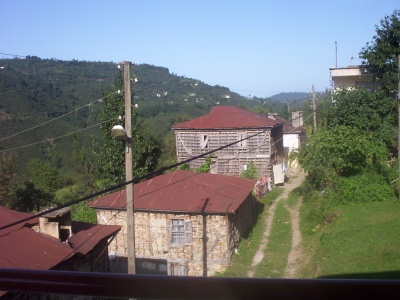
- Kestane, a village in Gülyalı district

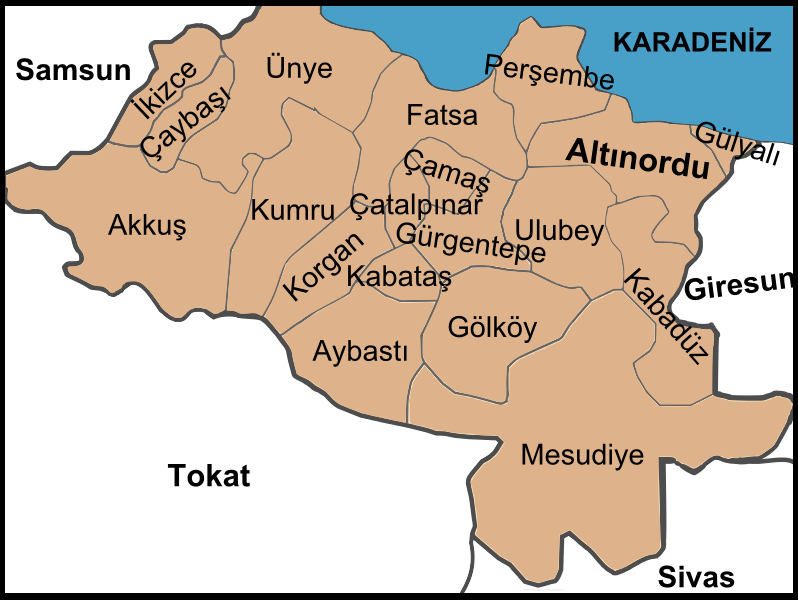
- Map showing Gülyalı District in Ordu Province

- Location within Turkey
- Coordinates: 40°58′00″N 38°03′25″E
- Country: Turkey
- Province: Ordu

Government
  - Mayor: Medet Sipahi (MHP)
- Area: 62 km^{2} (24 sq mi)
- Elevation: 10 m (33 ft)
- Population (2022): 8,425
  - Density: 140/km^{2} (350/sq mi)
- Time zone: UTC+3 (TRT)
- Area code: 0452
- Climate: Cfa
- Website: www.gulyali.bel.tr

Gülyalı, formerly Abulhayır, is a municipality and district of Ordu Province, Turkey. Its area is 62 km^{2}, and its population is 8,425 (2022). The town lies at an elevation of 10 m (33 ft).

Medet Sipahi of the Nationalist Movement Party was elected mayor in the 2024 local elections.

== Composition ==
There are 13 neighbourhoods in Gülyalı District:

- Alibey
- Ambarcılı
- Ayrılık
- Gülistan
- Hoşköy
- Kestane
- Mustafalı
- Sayaca
- Taşlıçay
- Tepealtı
- Turnasuyu
- Ürümbey
- Yeniköy
