= Çaybaşı =

- District and municipality
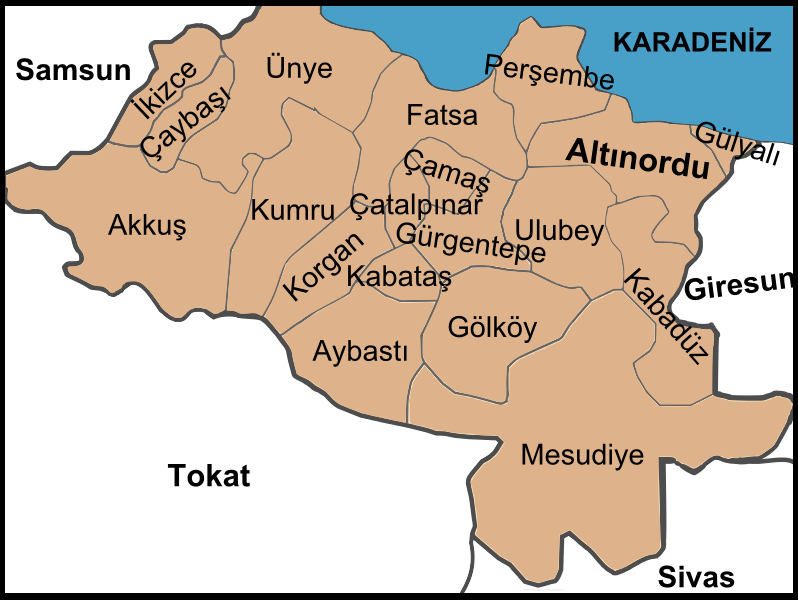
- Map showing Çaybaşı District in Ordu Province

- Location within Turkey
- Coordinates: 41°01′03″N 37°05′54″E
- Country: Turkey
- Province: Ordu

Government
  - Mayor: Mesut Karayiĝit (AKP)
- Area: 102 km^{2} (39 sq mi)
- Elevation: 500 m (1,600 ft)
- Population (2022): 11,889
  - Density: 117/km^{2} (302/sq mi)
- Time zone: UTC+3 (TRT)
- Postal code: 52310
- Area code: 0452
- Climate: Cfb
- Website: www.caybasi.bel.tr

Çaybaşı, formerly Çilader, is a municipality and district of Ordu Province, Turkey. Its area is 102 km^{2}, and its population is 11,889 (2022). The town lies at an elevation of 500 m (1,640 ft).

== Composition ==
There are 16 neighbourhoods in Çaybaşı District:

- Akbaba
- Aşıklı Çakıllı
- Boras
- Çağlayan
- Çandır
- Çay
- Çayır
- Cemallı
- Cevizliyatak
- Çınar
- Eğribel
- Göksu
- Gürcek
- Hacıali
- İçeribükü
- İlküvez
- Kapılı
- Kargalı
- Köklük
- Kurudere
- Kuşlu
- Mollalı
- Namazlı
- Taşkesiği
- Tekke
- Yenicuma
