= Aybastı =

- District and municipality
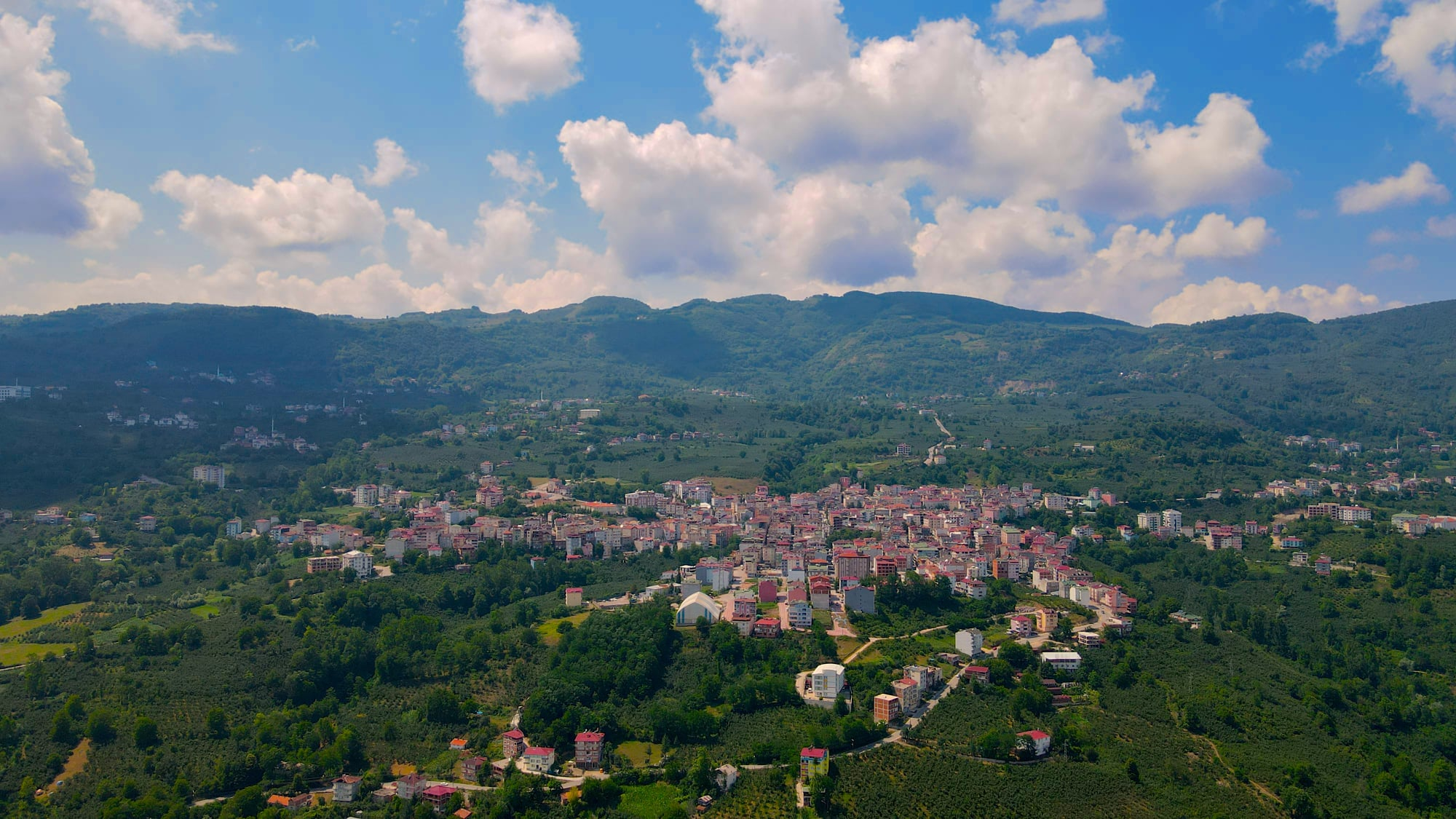

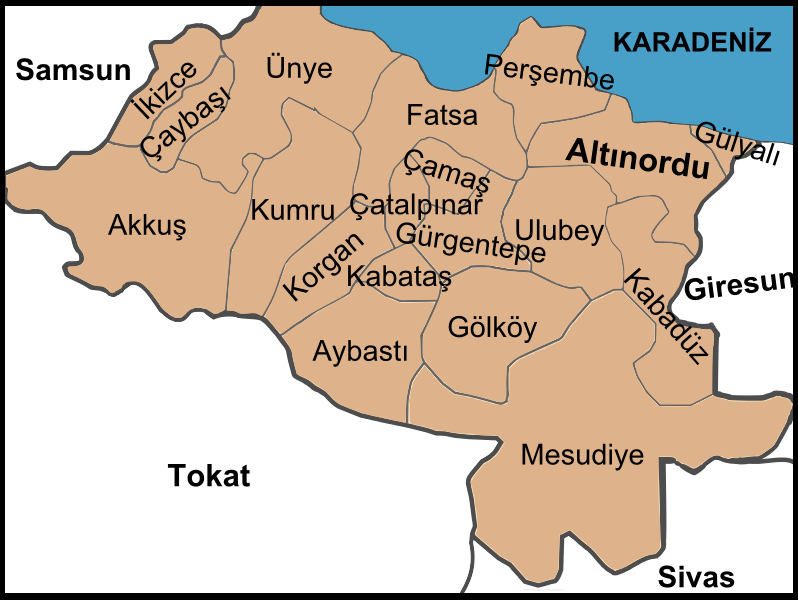
- Map showing Aybastı District in Ordu Province

- Location within Turkey
- Coordinates: 40°41′12″N 37°23′57″E
- Country: Turkey
- Province: Ordu

Government
  - Mayor: Izzet Gündoğar (AKP)
- Area: 250 km^{2} (97 sq mi)
- Elevation: 764 m (2,507 ft)
- Population (2022): 20,969
  - Density: 84/km^{2} (220/sq mi)
- Time zone: UTC+3 (TRT)
- Postal code: 52500
- Area code: 0452
- Climate: Csb
- Website: www.aybasti.bel.tr

Aybastı is a municipality and district of Ordu Province, Turkey. Its area is 250 km^{2}, and its population is 20,969 (2022). The town lies at an elevation of 764 m (2,507 ft).

== Etymology ==
The town was formerly known as Ibasdi (variants include Ibasda and Ibassa, Ίβασσα in ancient Greek) and mutated to Aybastı in the 20th century.

== Geography ==
Aybastı is a rural, agricultural district in the foothills of the Canik Mountains above the Black Sea coast, 54 km inland from the coastal town of Fatsa. The climate and flora are typical of the central Black Sea region although the district is drier at high altitudes. This is good agricultural land with 192 km^{2} (74 sq mi) of meadow and 116 km^{2} (45 sq mi) of farmland. The road up here from the coast is slow and winding, the journey takes over an hour, and journey from here up into the mountains is even worse, some of it on dirt roads. The people of these country villages are very traditional, for example they marry between the ages of 15 and 22 by arrangement between the families.

Aybastı itself is a small town providing high schools, a hospital and other basic amenities to the surrounding area. Market day is Saturday. The town is growing and today most buildings are four stories or more, the local economy is boosted by money coming from families that since the 1960s have been living and working in Istanbul, Ankara or abroad (especially France and Austria).

== Composition ==
There are 21 neighbourhoods in Aybastı District:

- Alacalar
- Armutlu
- Beşdam
- Çakırlı
- Çukur
- Esenli
- Fatih
- Hisarcık
- Karamanlı
- Kayabaşı
- Koyunculu
- Küçükyaka
- Kutlular
- Ortaköy
- Pelitözü
- Safalık
- Sağlık
- Sarıyar
- Toygar
- Uzundere
- Zaferimilli

== Places of interest ==
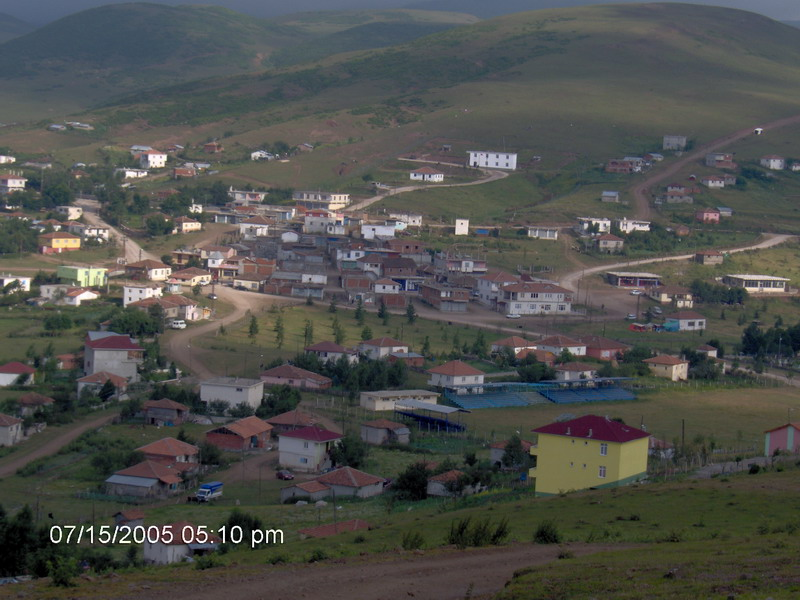
Perşembe Plateau

- Perşembe Plateau (Turkish: Perşembe Yaylası) is a high meadow, one of the biggest tourist attractions in the area, located 17 km from the town of Aybastı. Under snow in winter but popular with walkers and trekkers in summer, when there are folklore festivals and country fairs in the 3rd week of July.
