= Kabadüz =

- District and municipality
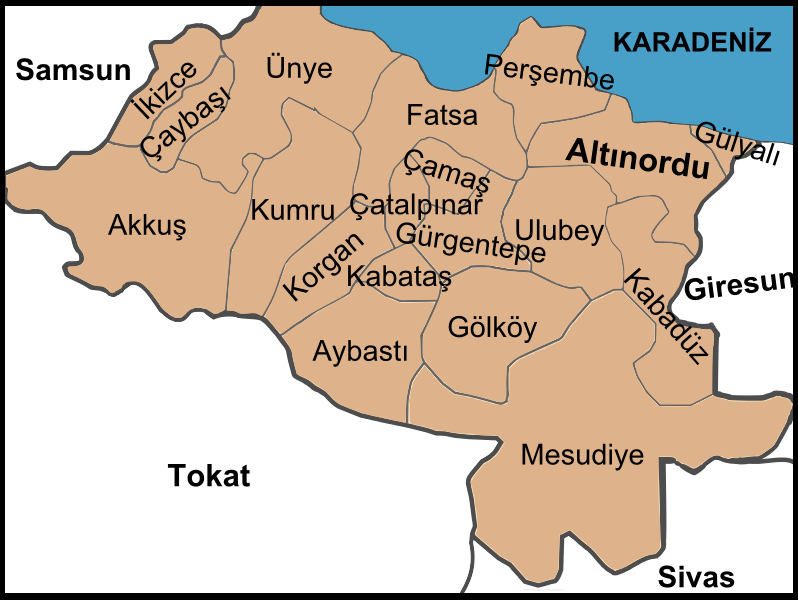
- Map showing Kabadüz District in Ordu Province

- Location within Turkey
- Coordinates: 40°51′35″N 37°53′24″E
- Country: Turkey
- Province: Ordu

Government
  - Mayor: Yener Kaya (AKP)
- Area: 343 km^{2} (132 sq mi)
- Elevation: 580 m (1,900 ft)
- Population (2022): 7,055
  - Density: 20.6/km^{2} (53.3/sq mi)
- Time zone: UTC+3 (TRT)
- Postal code: 52020
- Area code: 0452
- Climate: Cfb
- Website: www.kabaduz.bel.tr

Kabadüz is a municipality and district of Ordu Province, Turkey. Its area is 343 km^{2}, and its population is 7,055 (2022). The town lies at an elevation of 580 m (1,903 ft). Kabadüz is a district of green hillsides, 21 km inland from the city of Ordu.

== Composition ==
There are 19 neighbourhoods in Kabadüz District:

- Akgüney
- Başköy
- Derinçay
- Dişkaya
- Esenyurt
- Gelinkaya
- Gülpınar
- Gümüşdere
- Harami
- Kabadüz
- Karakiraz
- Kirazdere
- Musakırık
- Özlükent
- Turnalık
- Yeşilada
- Yeşilyurt
- Yokuşdibi
- Yukarı Kirazdere
