= Kabataş, Ordu =

Town and district in Black Sea, Turkey

Kabataş
- District and municipality
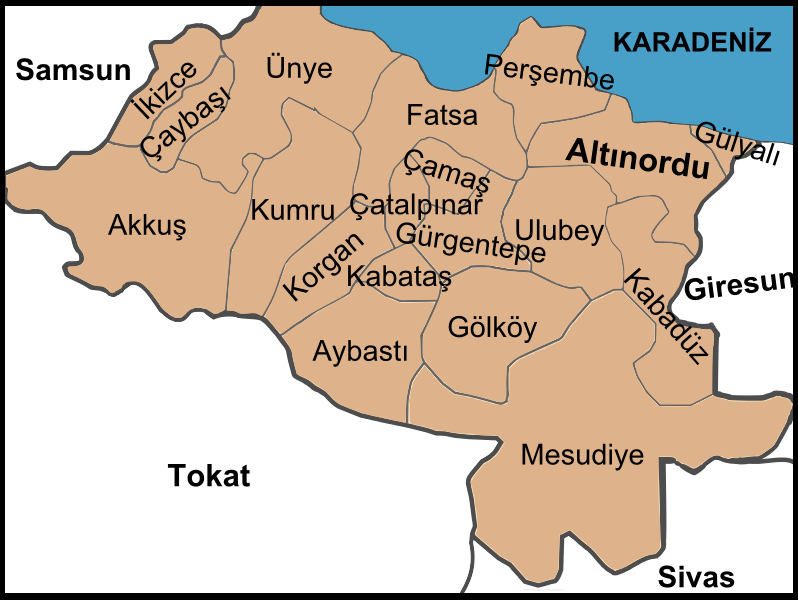
- Map showing Kabataş District in Ordu Province

- Location within Turkey
- Coordinates: 40°45′00″N 37°27′00″E
- Country: Turkey
- Province: Ordu

Government
  - Mayor: Bülent Güney (CHP)
- Area: 74 km^{2} (29 sq mi)
- Elevation: 450 m (1,480 ft)
- Population (2022): 10,119
  - Density: 140/km^{2} (350/sq mi)
- Time zone: UTC+3 (TRT)
- Postal code: 52520
- Area code: 0452
- Climate: Cfb
- Website: www.kabatas.bel.tr

Kabataş, formerly Karay, is a municipality and district of Ordu Province, Turkey. Its area is 74 km^{2}, and its population is 10,119 (2022). The town lies at an elevation of 450 m (1,476 ft).

Formerly the village of Karay, Kabataş is in the Canik Mountains, 40 km inland from the Black Sea coast. The area was conquered by the Anatolian beylik of Hacıemir in 1380.

== Composition ==
There are 18 neighbourhoods in Kabataş District:

- Alanbaşı
- Alankent
- Ardıç
- Belen
- Beylerli
- Çukurcak
- Düz
- Eceli
- Elbeyi
- Hoşkadem
- Ilıcak
- Kabataş
- Kabataş Yeni
- Kayıncık
- Kuzköy
- Şifa Suyu
- Yakacık
- Yeniceli
