= Çatalpınar =

- District and municipality
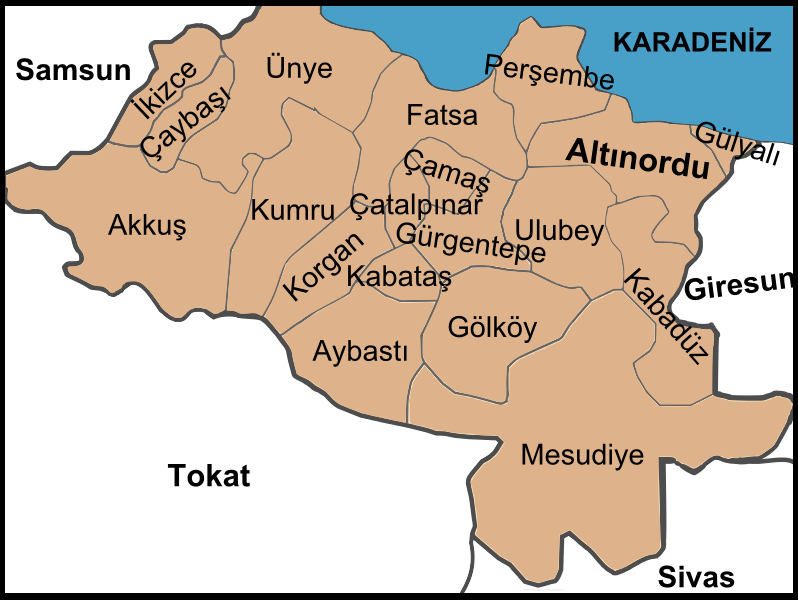
- Map showing Çatalpınar District in Ordu Province

- Location within Turkey
- Coordinates: 40°52′44″N 37°27′11″E
- Country: Turkey
- Province: Ordu

Government
  - Mayor: Ahmet Õzay (AKP)
- Area: 101 km^{2} (39 sq mi)
- Elevation: 150 m (490 ft)
- Population (2022): 13,025
  - Density: 129/km^{2} (334/sq mi)
- Time zone: UTC+3 (TRT)
- Postal code: 52420
- Area code: 0452
- Climate: Cfa
- Website: www.catalpinar.bel.tr

Çatalpınar is a municipality and district of Ordu Province, Turkey. Its area is 101 km^{2}, and its population is 13,025 (2022). The town lies at an elevation of 150 m (492 ft).

The local economy depends on agriculture, particularly growing hazelnuts and grazing animals. There is a mineral water spring in the village of Elmaköy.

== Composition ==
There are 23 neighbourhoods in Çatalpınar District:

- Akkaya
- Dere
- Elmaköy
- Göller
- Gündoğdu
- Güney
- Güneyce
- Haşal
- Hatipler
- İncirli
- Karahamza
- Karahasan
- Karşıyaka
- Kayatepe
- Keçili
- Kıran
- Madenköy
- Merkez
- Ortaköy
- Sayacatürk
- Şirinköy
- Terimli
- Yenimahalle
