= Gölköy =

- District and municipality
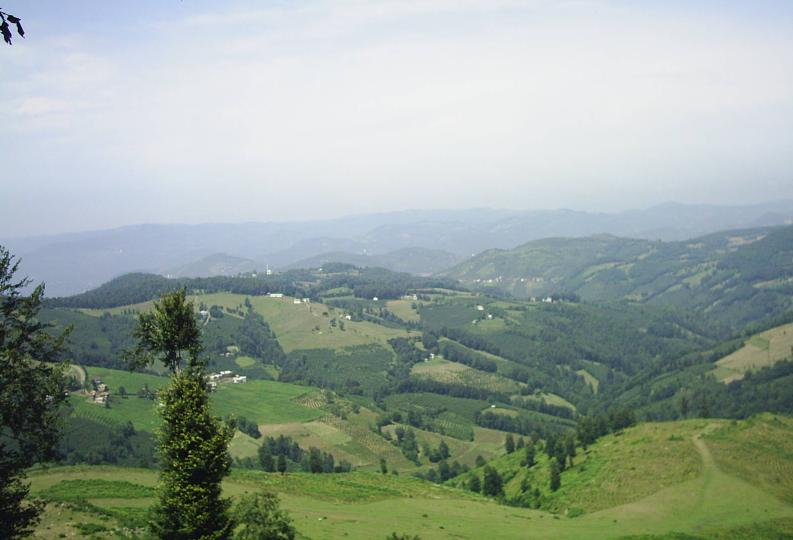

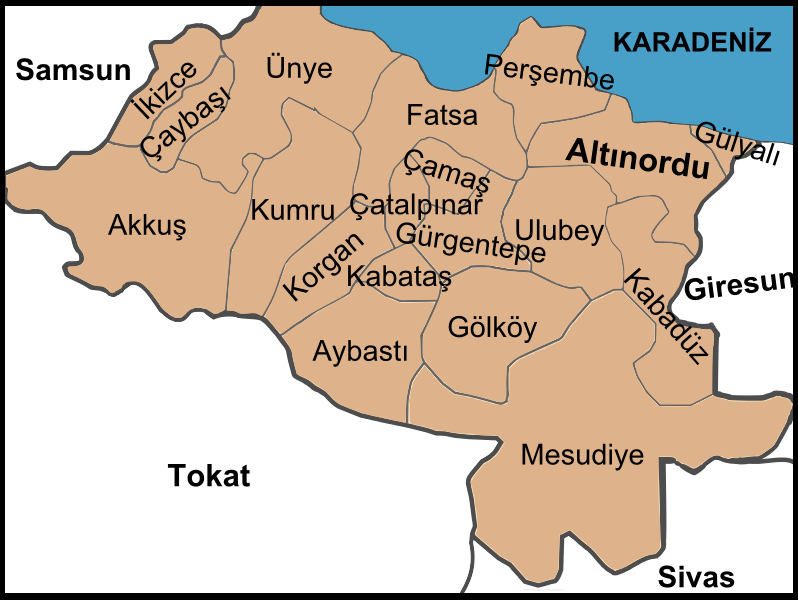
- Map showing Gölköy District in Ordu Province

- Location within Turkey
- Coordinates: 40°41′15″N 37°37′04″E
- Country: Turkey
- Province: Ordu

Government
  - Mayor: Fikri Uludağ (AKP)
- Area: 421 km^{2} (163 sq mi)
- Elevation: 820 m (2,690 ft)
- Population (2022): 25,960
  - Density: 61.7/km^{2} (160/sq mi)
- Time zone: UTC+3 (TRT)
- Postal code: 52600
- Area code: 0452
- Climate: Csb
- Website: www.golkoy.bel.tr

Gölköy is a municipality and district of Ordu Province, Turkey. Its area is 421 km^{2}, and its population is 25,960 (2022). The town is located 60 km (37 mi) inland from the city of Ordu on the road to Sivas. The town lies at an elevation of 820 m (2,690 ft).

Places of interest include the Byzantine castle of Habsamana, and a number of places for walking and climbing including the village of Cihadiye and the lake of Ulugöl.

== Composition ==
There are 30 neighbourhoods in Gölköy District:

- Ahmetli
- Akçalı
- Alanyurt
- Aydoğan
- Bayıralan
- Bulut
- Çatak
- Çetilli
- Cihadiye
- Damarlı
- Direkli
- Düzyayla
- Emirler
- Gölköy
- Güzelyayla
- Güzelyurt
- Haruniye
- Hürriyet
- İçyaka
- Kaleköy
- Karagöz
- Karahasan
- Konak
- Kozören
- Kuşluvan
- Özlü
- Paşapınar
- Sarıca
- Süleymaniye
- Yuvapınar

== Gallery ==
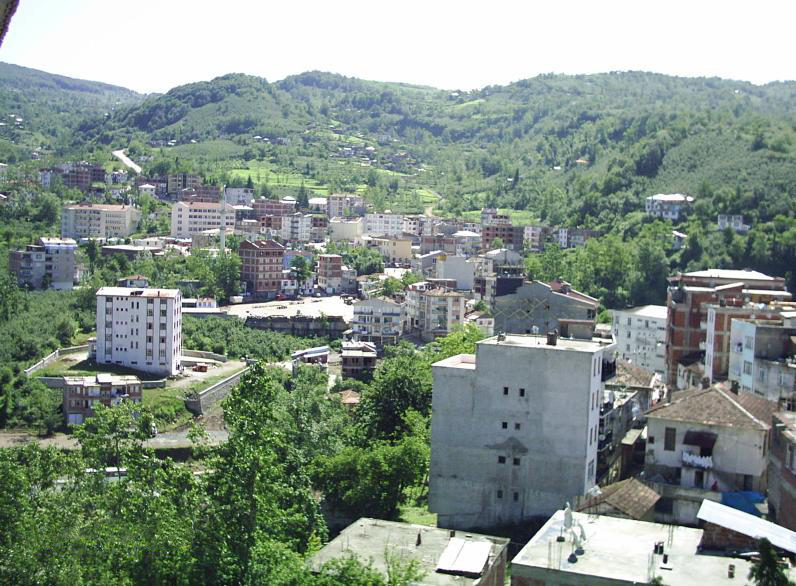
Gölköy town center

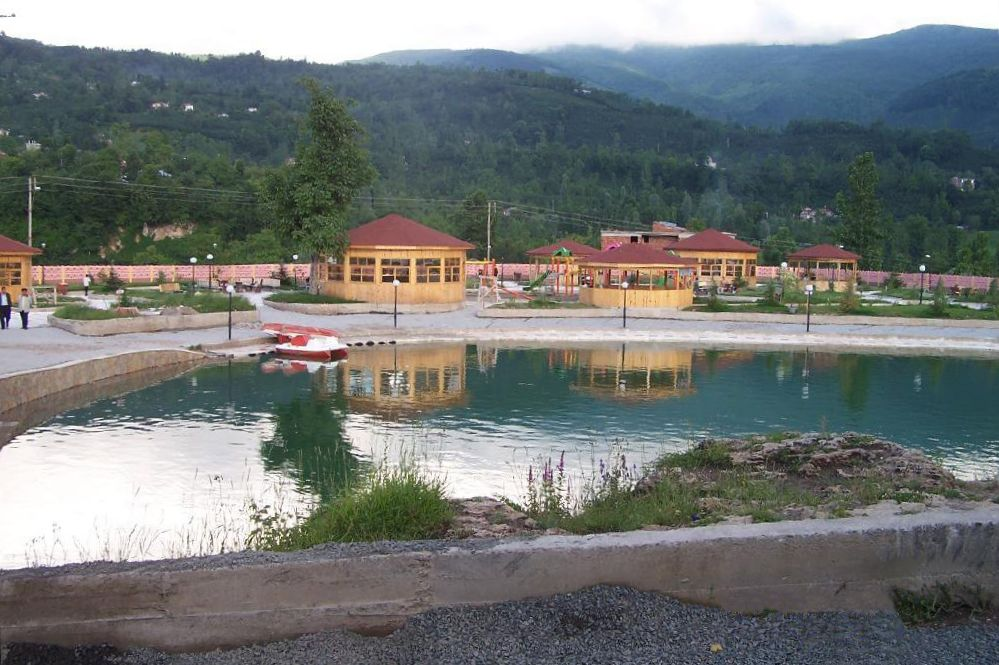
A small lake in Gölköy district

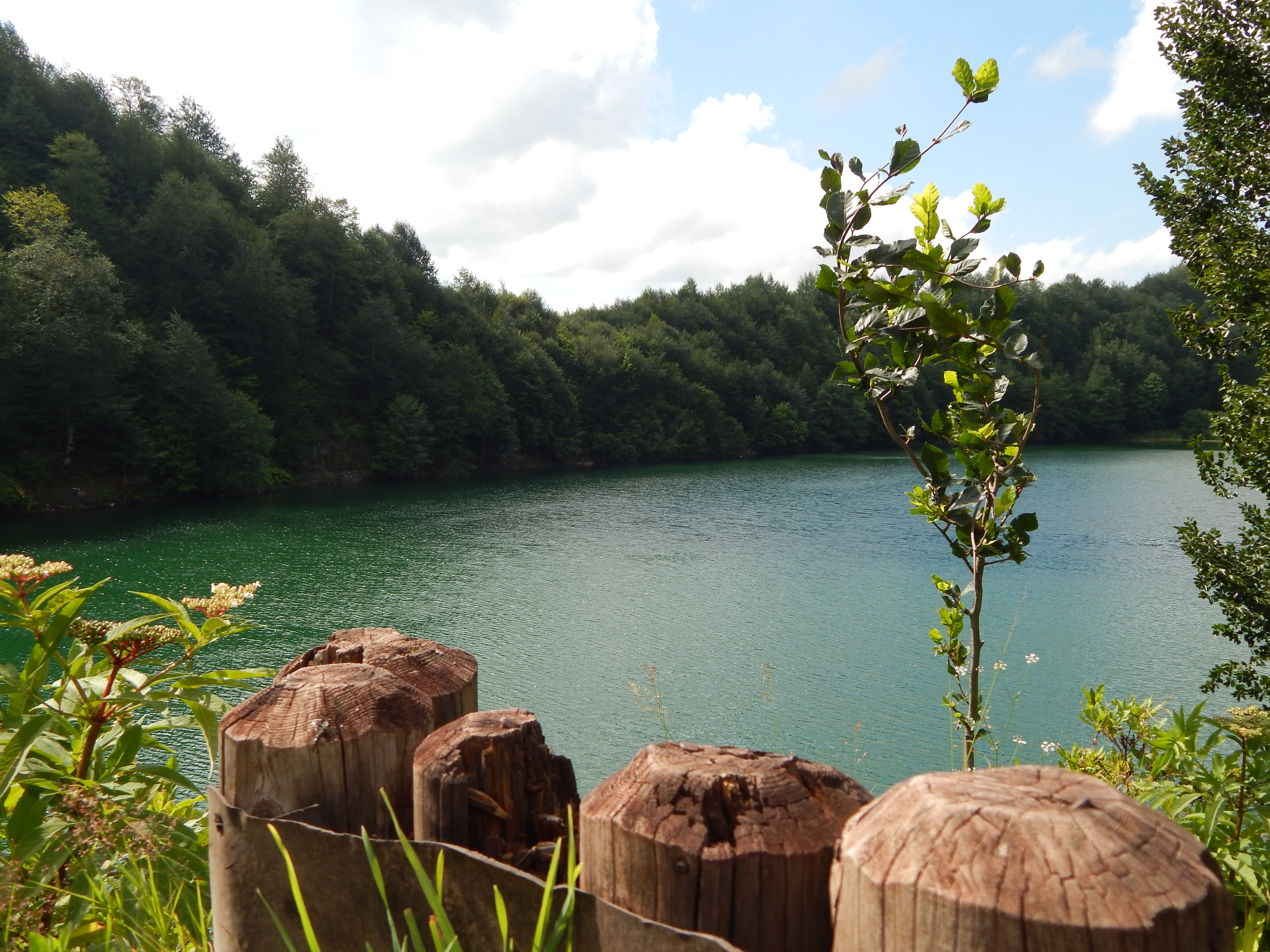
Gölköy Lake view
