= Korgan =

- District and municipality
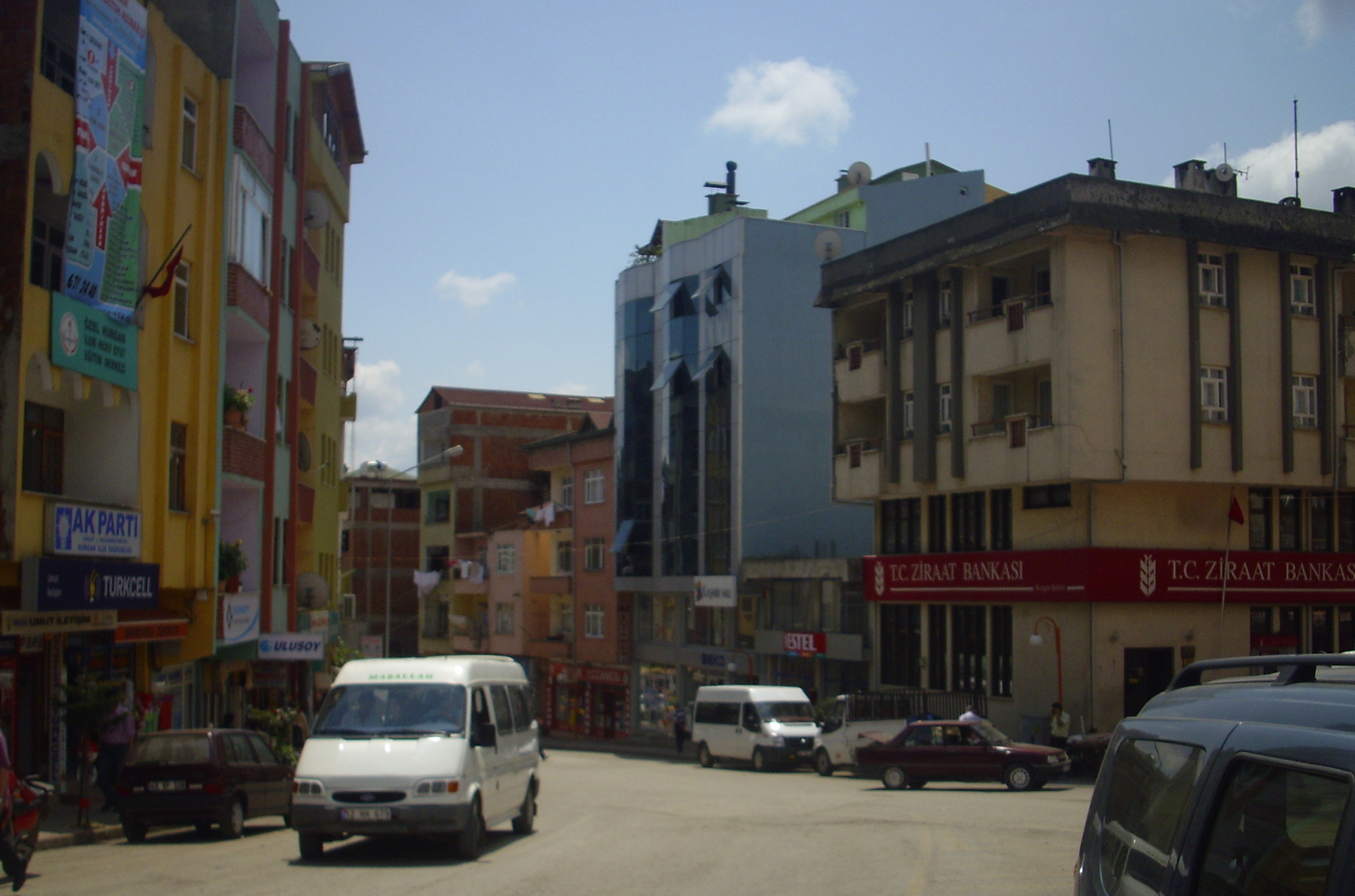

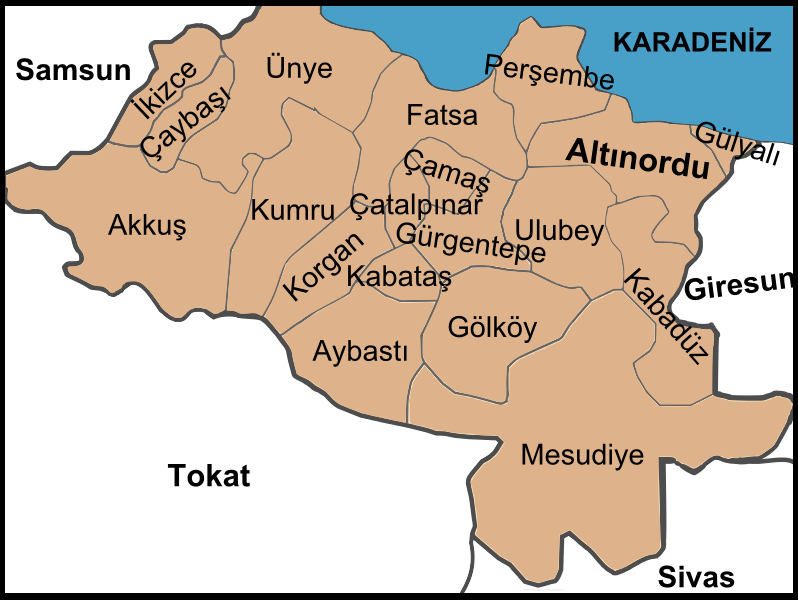
- Map showing Korgan District in Ordu Province

- Location within Turkey
- Coordinates: 40°49′29″N 37°20′48″E
- Country: Turkey
- Province: Ordu

Government
  - Mayor: Sait Korgan (İYİ)
- Area: 254 km^{2} (98 sq mi)
- Elevation: 764 m (2,507 ft)
- Population (2022): 27,349
  - Density: 108/km^{2} (279/sq mi)
- Time zone: UTC+3 (TRT)
- Postal code: 52700
- Area code: 0452
- Climate: Csb
- Website: www.korgan.bel.tr

Korgan is a municipality and district of Ordu Province, Turkey. Its area is 254 km^{2}, and its population is 27,349 (2022). The town lies at an elevation of 764 m (2,507 ft).

== History ==
The district of Korgan has been a source of iron ore since the reign of Mithridates, King of Pontus, and even before that the area was occupied by Persians in the reign of Darius I in the 6th century BC, as part of the Satrapy of Pontus and Cappadocia. The Persian presence was erased by the armies of Alexander the Great in 331BC, and the area eventually became part of the Kingdom of Pontus and then the Roman Empire. This era ended in 1083 when Korgan was conquered by the Turkish armies of Danishmend Gazi. Subsequently a number of Turkish tribes ruled here until 1398 when Bayezid I brought the area, then known as Keşdere after a tributary of the River Bolaman, into the Ottoman Empire.

== Composition ==
There are 29 neighbourhoods in Korgan District:

- Aşağıkozpınar
- Aşağıyaylacık
- Belalan
- Beypınarı
- Büyükakçakese
- Çamlı
- Çayırkent
- Çiftlik
- Çitlice
- Dip
- Durali
- Karakışla
- Karakoyunlu
- Koççığaz
- Sarıaliç
- Soğukpınar
- Tatarcık
- Tepe
- Tepealan
- Terzili
- Yazıcı
- Yazlık
- Yeniköy
- Yenipınar
- Yeşilalan
- Yeşildere
- Yeşilyurt
- Yukarıkozpınar
- Yukarıyaylacık
