= Mesudiye, Ordu =

Mesudiye
- District and municipality
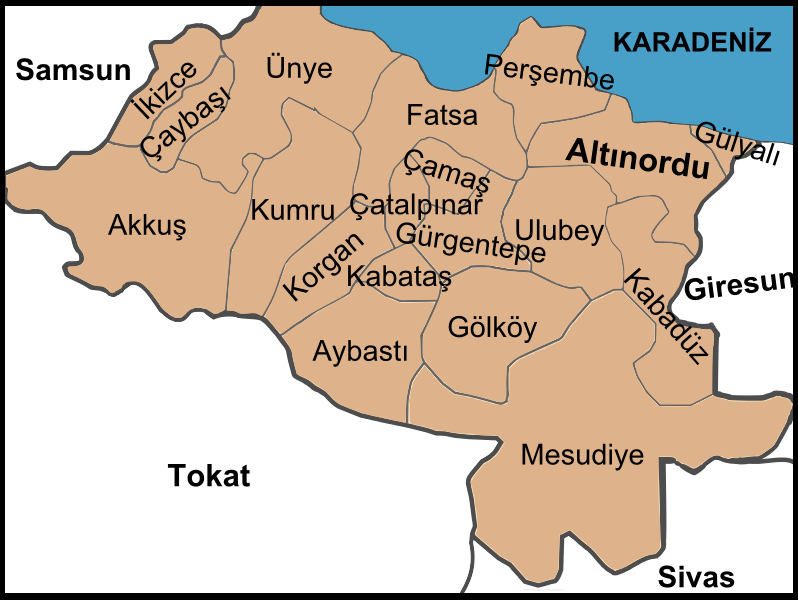
- Map showing Mesudiye District in Ordu Province

- Location within Turkey
- Coordinates: 40°27′45″N 37°46′21″E
- Country: Turkey
- Province: Ordu

Government
  - Mayor: Cengiz Koçyiğit (AKP)
- Area: 1,046 km^{2} (404 sq mi)
- Elevation: 1,100 m (3,600 ft)
- Population (2022): 13,221
  - Density: 12.64/km^{2} (32.74/sq mi)
- Time zone: UTC+3 (TRT)
- Postal code: 52900
- Area code: 0452
- Climate: Csb
- Website: www.mesudiye.bel.tr

Mesudiye, formerly Hamidiye, is a municipality and district of Ordu Province, Turkey. Its area is 1,046 km^{2}, and its population is 13,221 (2022). The town lies at an elevation of 1,100 m (3,609 ft).

Mesudiye is a large area of hilly countryside, villages and pasture far inland from the Black Sea coast, south-west of the city of Ordu, in the direction of Sivas. This is a low-income district that since the 1950s has seen successive generations migrate away to jobs in Istanbul and elsewhere. Today Mesudiye itself is a small town of 5,600 people and the whole district is sparsely populated, although busier in summer with returning Mesudiye families on vacation. Efforts are being made by the state to boost the local economy including the opening of a college of a higher education college. Mesudiye is a home to sizeable Chepni Turkmen population. also, was capital of Chepni Beylik Hacıemiroğulları.

== History ==
Mesudiye has been inhabited since the Iron Age era and has numerous remains from the time of the Hittites and there are a number of rock tombs from early antiquity in the area. When it was brought into the Ottoman Empire by Mehmed II in 1455 the area was a collection of mountain villages centred on the slightly larger village and market place known then as Milas. This was renamed Hamidiye in 1876 and then Mesudiye in 1908. According to Bryer and Winfield, the later Greek name for Mesudiye (or Hamidiye) was Meletios, Melet, or Milas (Grk: Μελέτιος, Μελέτ, or Μήλας), probably derived from the Melanthios River (Melet Irmak) which runs through it and down to Ordu.

== Composition ==
There are 71 neighbourhoods in Mesudiye District:

- Abdili
- Akkırık
- Akpınar
- Alanköy
- Arıcılar
- Arıkmusa
- Armutkolu
- Arpaalan
- Aşağıgökçe
- Aşıklı
- Bahçe
- Balıklı
- Bayırköy
- Bayraklı
- Beşpınar
- Beyağaç
- Beyseki
- Birebir
- Çaltepe
- Çardaklı
- Çavdar
- Celalköy
- Çerçi
- Çitliksarıca
- Çukuralan
- Darıcabaşı
- Dayılı
- Derebaşı
- Doğançam
- Dursunlu
- Erikköy
- Esatlı
- Göçbeyi
- Gölbaşı
- Gülpınar
- Güneyce
- Güvenli
- Güzelce
- Güzle
- Hamzalı
- Herközü
- Ilışar
- Kaleköy
- Karabayır
- Karacaören
- Kavaklıdere
- Kayadibi
- Kayadibi
- Kışlacık
- Konacık
- Köşe
- Mahmudiye
- Maksutalan
- Merkez
- Musalı
- Müslümsarıca
- Pınarlı
- Sarıca
- Sarıyayla
- Topçam
- Türkköyü
- Üçyol
- Yagmurlar
- Yardere
- Yavşan
- Yenimahalle
- Yeşilce
- Yeşilçit
- Yeveli
- Yukarıgökçe
- Yuvalı
