= Ünye =

- District and municipality
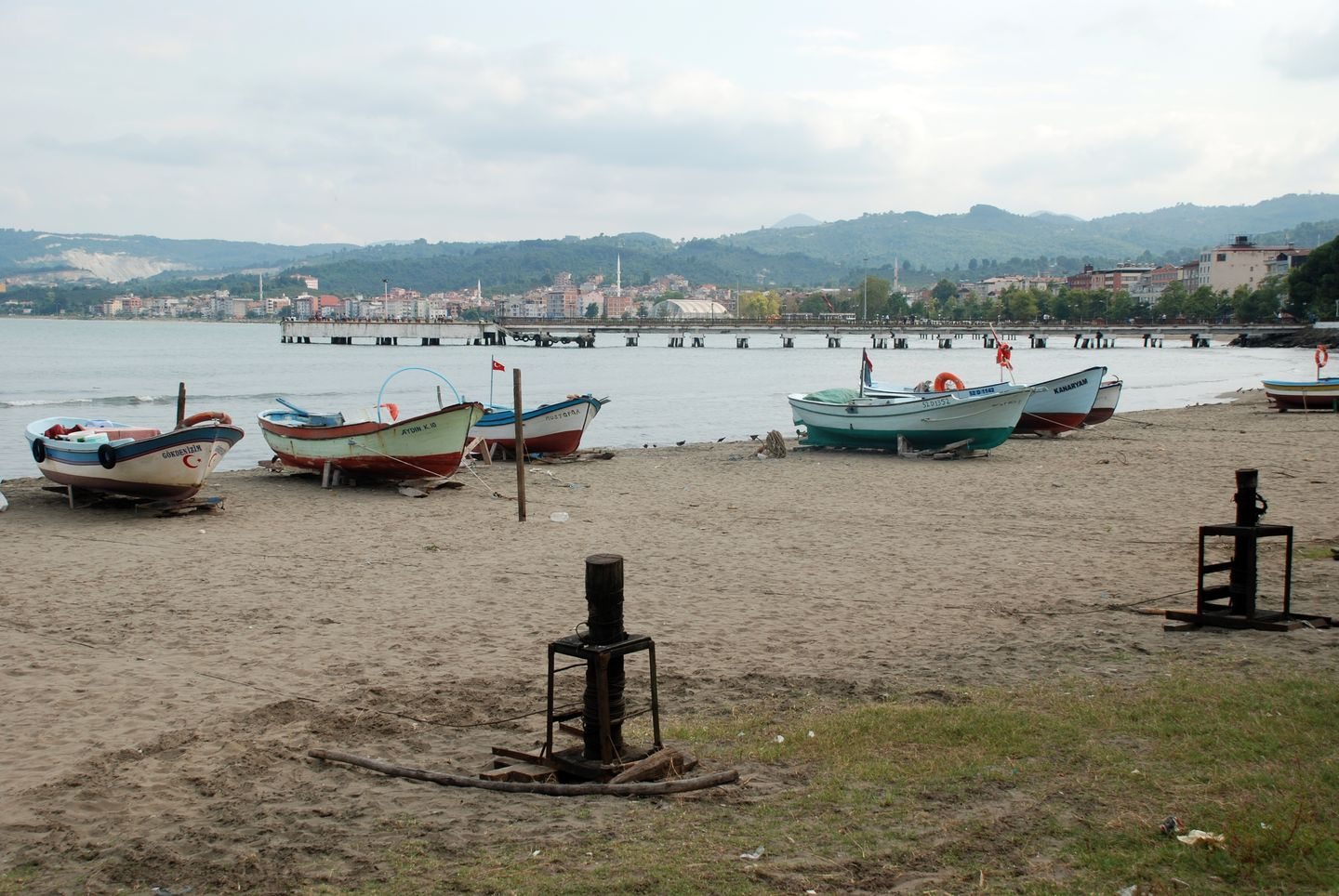

- Logo

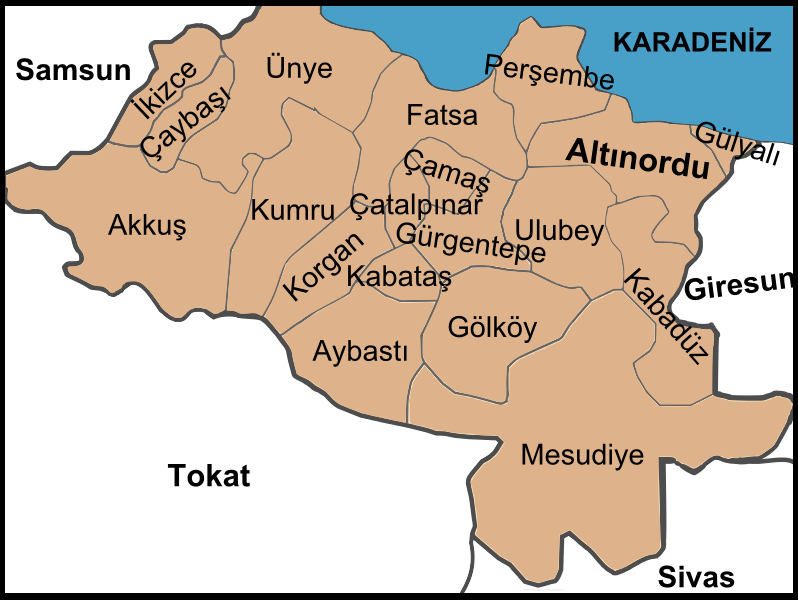
- Map showing Ünye District in Ordu Province

- Location within Turkey
- Coordinates: 41°07′38″N 37°17′17″E
- Country: Turkey
- Province: Ordu

Government
  - Mayor: Hüseyin Tavlı (AKP)
- Area: 569 km^{2} (220 sq mi)
- Elevation: 10 m (33 ft)
- Population (2022): 132,432
  - Density: 233/km^{2} (603/sq mi)
- Time zone: UTC+3 (TRT)
- Postal code: 52300
- Area code: 0452
- Climate: Cfa
- Website: www.unye.bel.tr

Ünye is a municipality and district of Ordu Province, Turkey. Its area is 569 km^{2}, and its population is 132,432 (2022). It is on the Black Sea coast, 76 km west of the city of Ordu.

== Overview ==
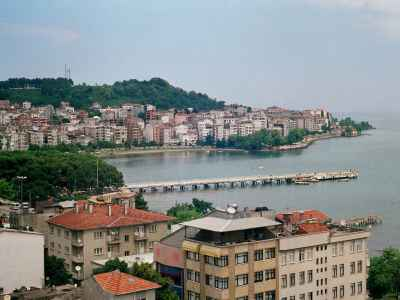

Ünye has a little port, in a bay on one of the flatter areas of the Black Sea coast. Agriculture is the basis of the local economy, in particular hazelnut growing, hazelnut trading and hazelnut processing. The town is very quiet in late-July and August when most people are in the countryside for the hazelnut harvest.

The town of Ünye provides high schools, higher education and other services to the surrounding countryside, and other industry includes a large cement factory, flour mills, local handicrafts and the port. The town has grown in recent decades, acquiring the multi-storey concrete blocks spreading along the coast, typical of so many Turkish towns. There are cafes and internet cafes popular with students. The cuisine includes the local pizza called pide.

With its quiet spots for picnics and walking and its beaches, Ünye is one of the few agricultural holiday towns on the eastern Black Sea coast. Cost-effective pensions and camping facilities as well as 2- or 3-star hotels can be found in the summer season. There are summer festivals and concerts in July.

=== Climate ===
Ünye has a humid subtropical climate (Köppen: Cfa). The climate is typical of the Black Sea region, warm and wet, although because the hinterland is flatter than most of the coastline Ünye has less rainfall.

Climate data for Ünye (1991–2020)
Month	Jan	Feb	Mar	Apr	May	Jun	Jul	Aug	Sep	Oct	Nov	Dec	Year
Mean daily maximum °C (°F)	10.4 (50.7)	10.5 (50.9)	12.0 (53.6)	14.6 (58.3)	19.0 (66.2)	24.0 (75.2)	26.9 (80.4)	27.7 (81.9)	24.4 (75.9)	20.2 (68.4)	15.9 (60.6)	12.4 (54.3)	18.2 (64.8)
Daily mean °C (°F)	7.3 (45.1)	7.1 (44.8)	8.4 (47.1)	11.0 (51.8)	15.6 (60.1)	20.6 (69.1)	23.6 (74.5)	24.3 (75.7)	20.9 (69.6)	16.9 (62.4)	12.5 (54.5)	9.2 (48.6)	14.8 (58.6)
Mean daily minimum °C (°F)	4.7 (40.5)	4.3 (39.7)	5.7 (42.3)	8.4 (47.1)	12.9 (55.2)	17.6 (63.7)	20.6 (69.1)	21.2 (70.2)	17.9 (64.2)	14.2 (57.6)	9.7 (49.5)	6.7 (44.1)	12.0 (53.6)
Average precipitation mm (inches)	121.53 (4.78)	93.4 (3.68)	98.22 (3.87)	67.98 (2.68)	71.49 (2.81)	73.7 (2.90)	83.33 (3.28)	109.31 (4.30)	100.16 (3.94)	140.69 (5.54)	127.72 (5.03)	126.49 (4.98)	1,214.02 (47.80)
Average precipitation days (≥ 1.0 mm)	11.3	10.3	11.8	8.9	8.9	6.9	6.0	6.3	8.5	10.3	9.1	11.3	109.6
Average relative humidity (%)	71.0	71.9	75.3	78.7	80.5	77.7	76.2	75.4	76.0	77.7	72.7	70.3	75.3
Mean monthly sunshine hours	74.7	89.5	116.8	156.3	200.9	237.3	247.3	227.0	184.4	136.8	109.5	70.8	1,851.1
Source: NOAA

== Etymology ==
The town's name has evolved from the Greek Oinoe through Oinaion, Unieh, Unie and Unia to the current Ünye.

== History ==
The history of Ünye goes back to the Hittite period in the 15th century BC, followed by the Kashkas, Scythians, Milesians, Persians, Pontus and Ancient Roman/Byzantine eras. During Greco-Roman times, it was called Oenoe and was a port town of Pontus, at the mouth of the river Genius.

It was also ruled by Danishmends between 1086 and 1098, 1141-1144 and 1150–1157, Sultanate of Rum between 1188 and 1204, 1214-1228 and 1230–1243, Empire of Trebizond in 1204–1214, 1228–1230, 1243-1297 and 1302-1346 and Emirate of Hacıemiroğlu between 1297-1302 and 1346–1461.

During the 1290s, the Ünye fortress was built by the Trebizond emperor Ioanni (II.).

In the year 1806 the Laz attacked Ünye. This led to the town being evacuated under the guidance of Bishop Meletios and resettling in Sinope.

== Composition ==
There are 85 neighbourhoods in Ünye District:

- Ağıdere
- Ataköy
- Atatürk
- Aydıntepe
- Başköy
- Bayramca
- Beylerce
- Buruncu
- Çakmak
- Çamurlu
- Çatak
- Çatalpınar
- Çataltepe
- Cevizdere
- Çiğdemköy
- Çınarcık
- Çınarlık
- Denizbükü
- Dereköy
- Dizdar
- Döşemedibi
- Düzköy
- Düzsaylan
- Elmalık
- Erenyurt
- Esenkale
- Eskikızılcakese
- Fatih
- Fevziçakmak
- Göbü
- Gölcüğez
- Gölevi
- Görecülü
- Günpınarı
- Güzelkale
- Güzelyalı
- Hamidiye
- Hanyanı
- Hızarbaşıgünlük
- Hızarbaşıkumarlı
- İnkur
- İpekyolu
- Kadılar
- Kaledere
- Kaledibi
- Kaleköy
- Karşıyaka
- Keşköy
- Killik
- Kocuklu
- Kuşçulu
- Kuşdoğan
- Liseler
- Nadirli
- Nurettin
- Nuriye
- Ortaköy
- Ortayılmazlar
- Pelitliyatak
- Pınarbaşı
- Sahilköy
- Saraçlı
- Saraycık
- Sarıhalil
- Şenyurt
- Seylan
- Sofutepesi
- Taflancık
- Taşça
- Tekkiraz
- Tepeköy
- Üçpınar
- Uğurlu
- Yavı
- Yaycı
- Yaylalı
- Yazkonağı
- Yenikent
- Yenikızılcakese
- Yeniköy
- Yeşilada
- Yeşilkent
- Yiğitler
- Yüceler
- Yunus Emre

== Sport ==
The women's football team Ünye Gücü F.K. was promoted to the Turkish Women's Super League following winning the play-offs at the end of the 2023-24 Turkish Women's First League.

== Main sights ==
- The 18th-century town hall.
- Çamlık - picnic area in a wood overlooking the sea
- Çakırtepe - a hilltop view of the town
- Ünye Castle (dating back to the Pontus era).
- Uzunkum - the longest beach on the Black Sea

== Notable natives ==
- Fahrettin Çiloğlu, writer and translator
- Gulsen, artist
