= Ordu Province =

Province of Turkey

Coordinates: 40°48′41″N 37°32′26″E

Ordu Province Ordu ili
- Province and metropolitan municipality
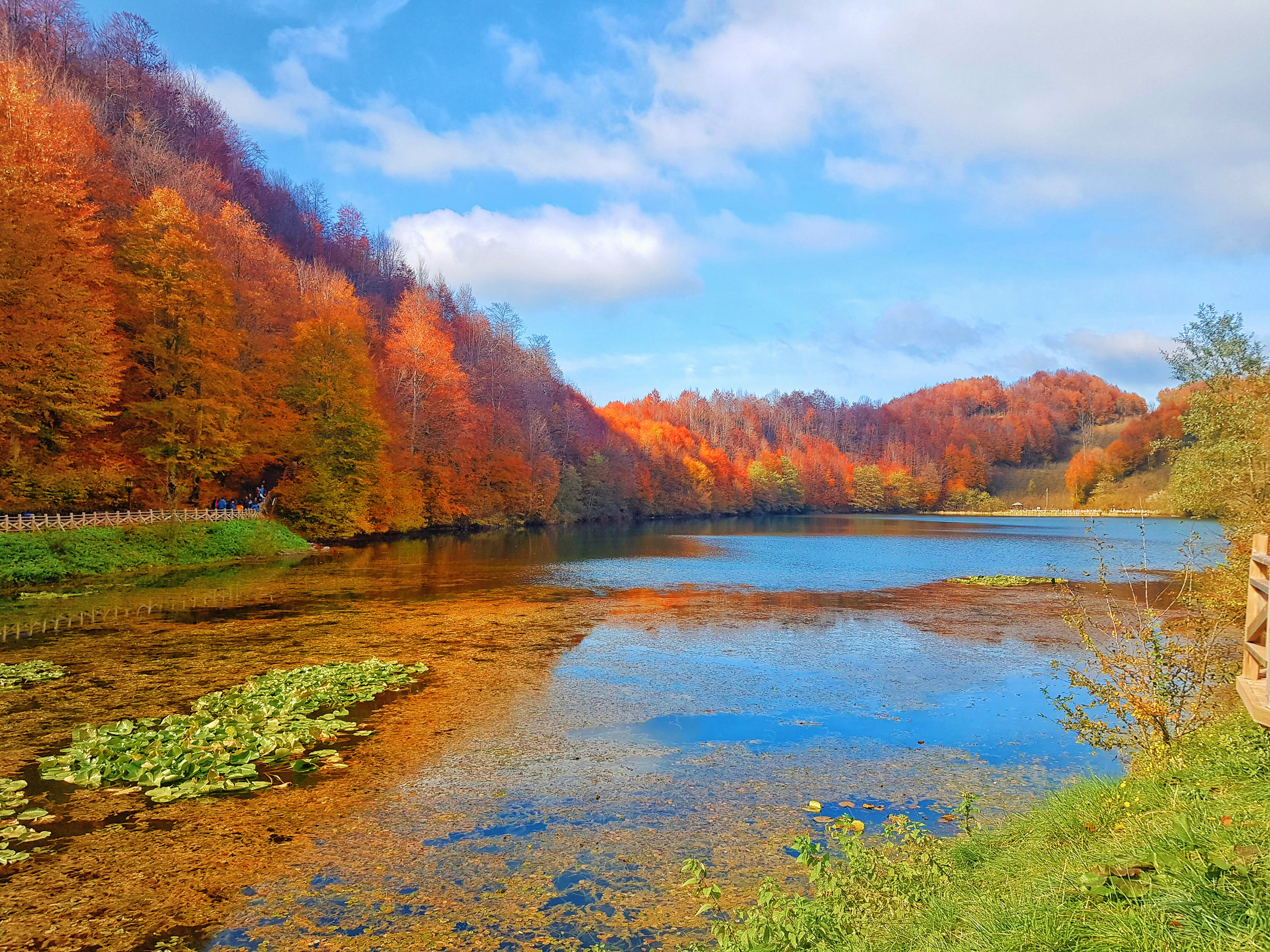
- Ordu Gölköy

- Location of the province within Turkey
- Country: Turkey
- Seat: Ordu

Government
  - Mayor: Mehmet Hilmi Güler (AK Party)
  - Vali: Muammer Erol
- Area: 5,914 km^{2} (2,283 sq mi)
- Population (2022): 763,190
  - Density: 129.0/km^{2} (334.2/sq mi)
- Time zone: UTC+3 (TRT)
- Area code: 0452
- Website: www.ordu.bel.tr www.ordu.gov.tr

Ordu Province (Turkish: Ordu ili) is a province and metropolitan municipality of Turkey, located on the Black Sea coast. Its area is 5,914 km^{2}, and its population is 763,190 (2022). Its adjacent provinces are Samsun to the northwest, Tokat to the southwest, Sivas to the south, and Giresun to the east. Its license-plate code is 52. The capital of the province is the city of Ordu.

== Geography ==
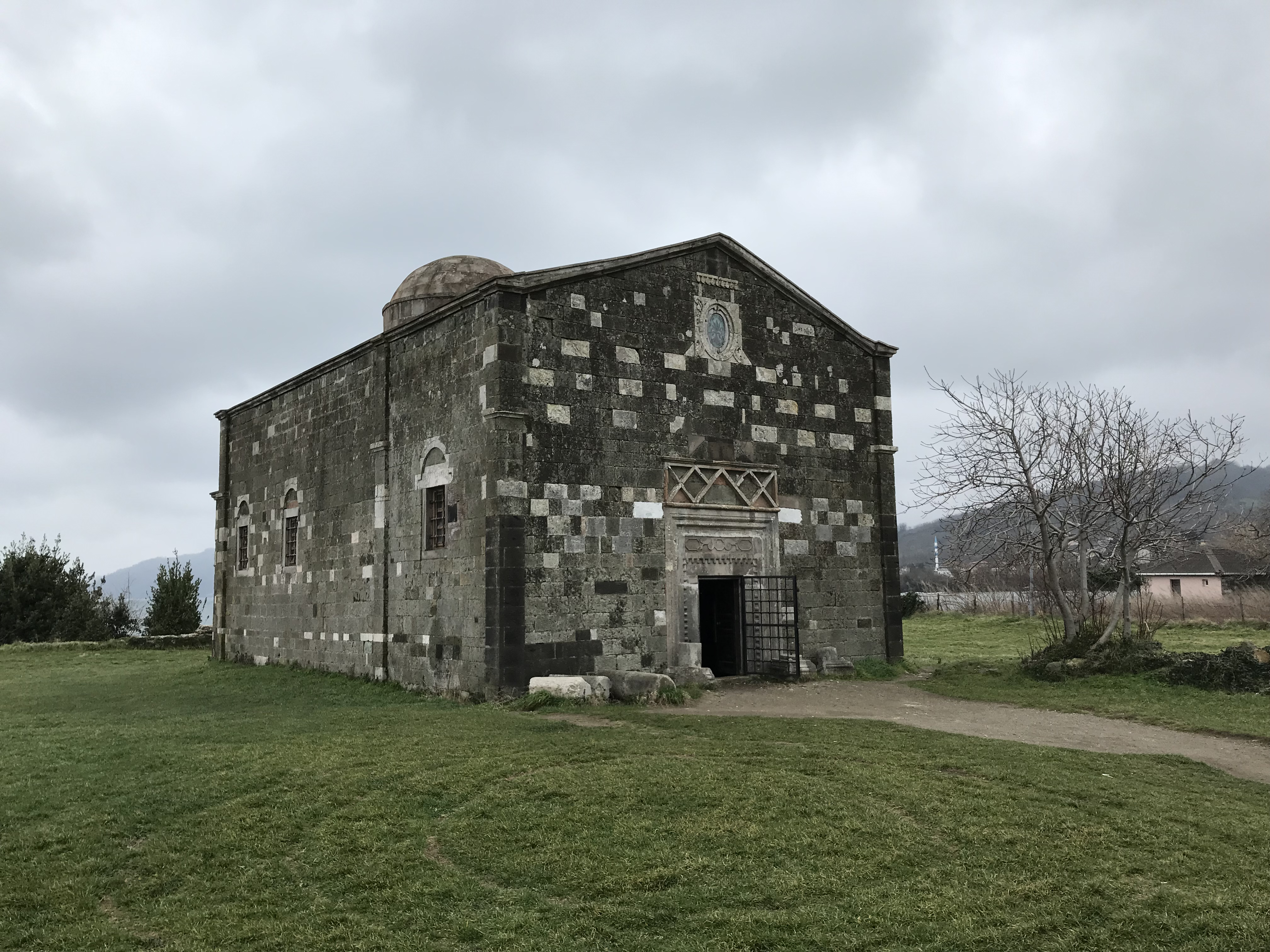
Byzantine church in Cape Jason, (Church Of Hagios Nikolaos), in Perşembe, Ordu.

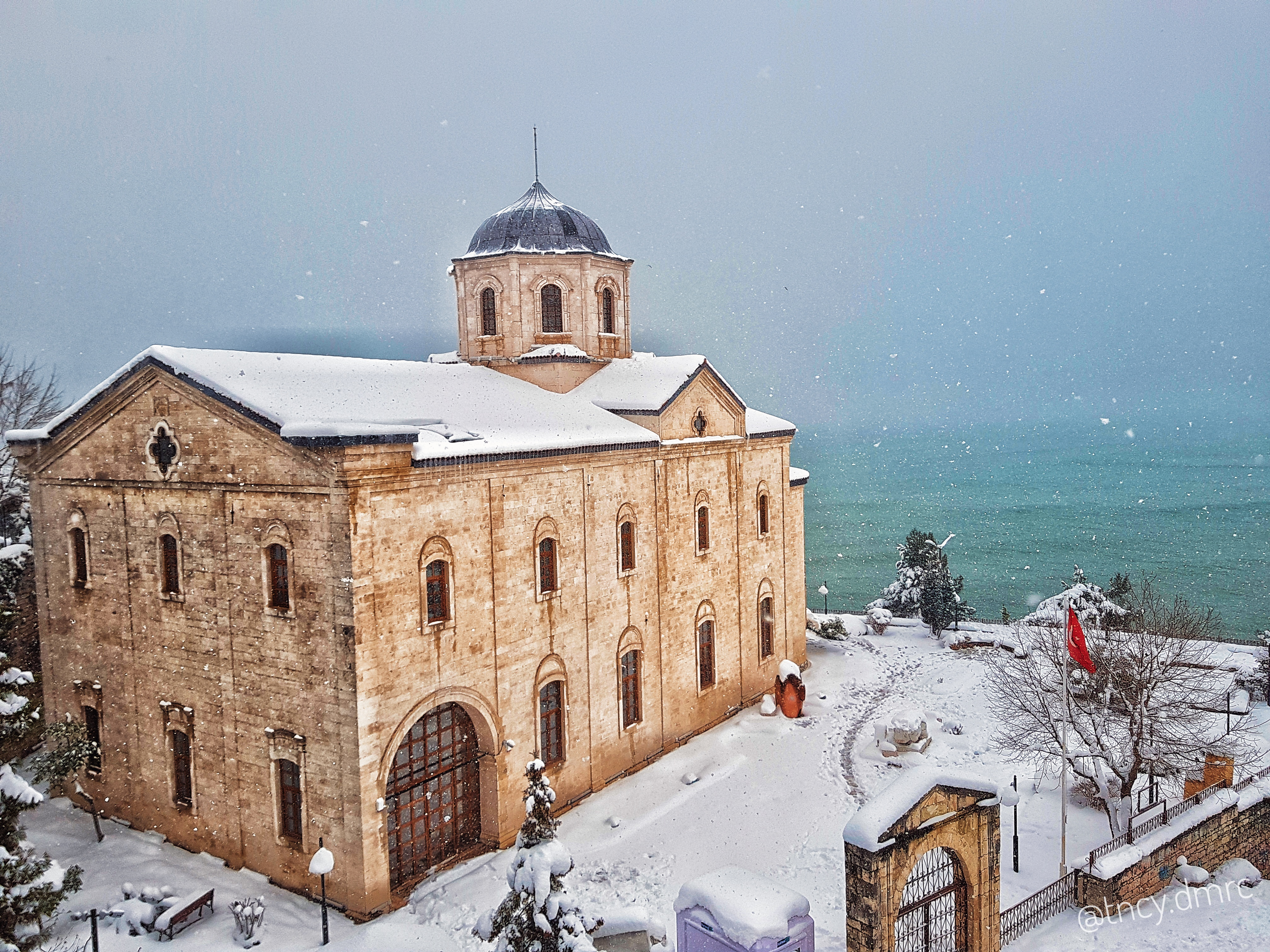
Church of Hypapante (Greek: Ναός της Υπαπαντής του Χρηστού, Turkish: Taşbaşı Kilisesi)

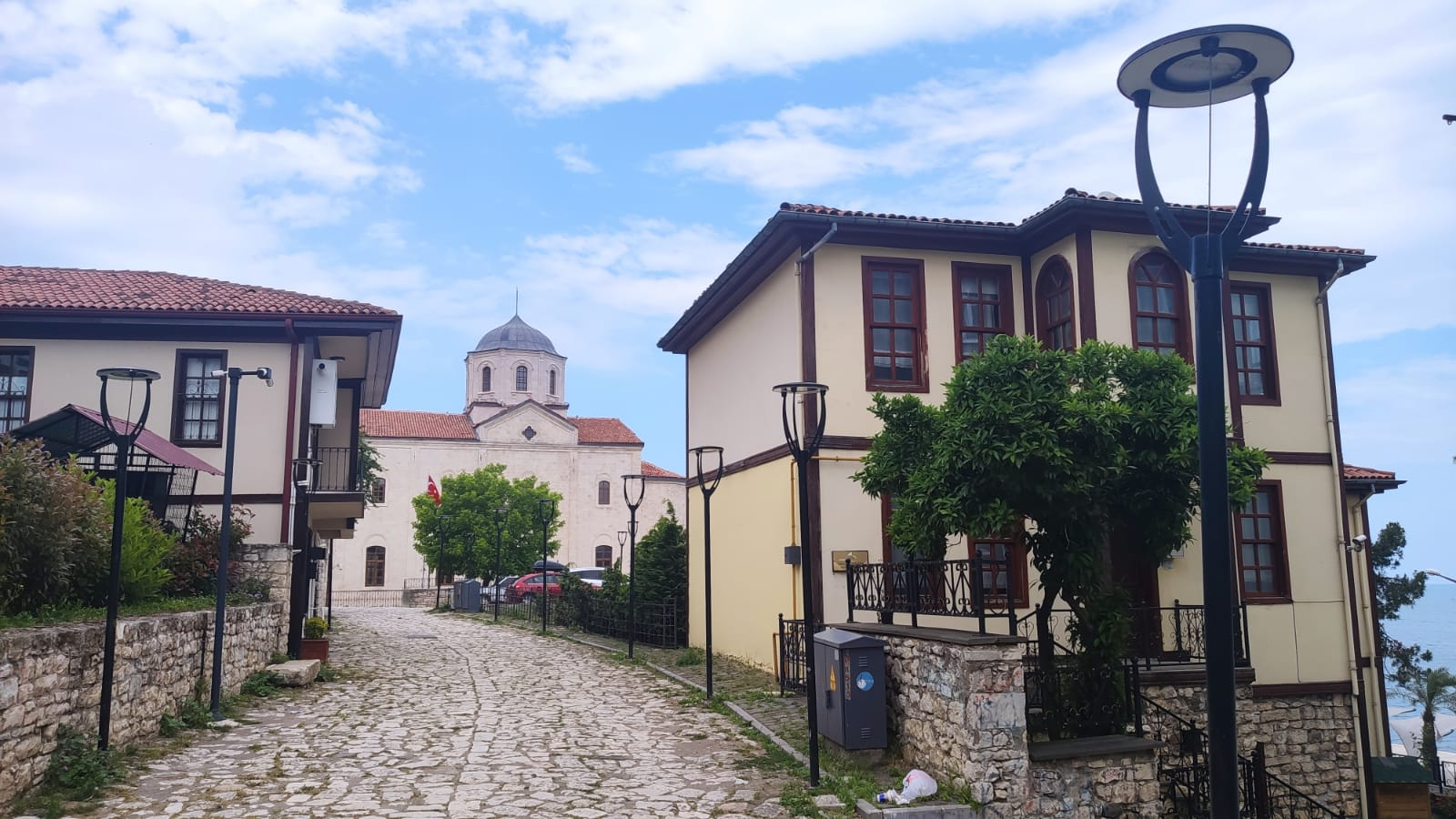
Ordu is the capital of the province.

Ordu is a strip of Black Sea coast and the hills behind, historically an agricultural and fishing area and in recent years, tourism has seen an increase, mainly visitors from Russia and Georgia, as Ordu boasts some of the best beaches, rivers, and lush, green mountains on the Black Sea coast. Walking in the high pastures is now a popular excursion for Turkish holidaymakers. The higher altitudes are covered in forest.

Melet River, Bolaman River, Elekçi River, Turnasuyu Stream, Akçaova Stream and Civil Stream are the main rivers of the province. The topography of the province is not conducive to lake formation and only two major lakes, Gaga Lake and Ulugöl, are present in Ordu.

== Economy ==
The economy of the province depends on agriculture. Ordu is famous for hazelnuts. Turkey as a whole produces about 70 percent of the world's hazelnuts, and Ordu is the chief producer in Turkey, responsible for 150,000–180,000 tonnes per year, which amounts to around 30% of Turkey's production. Hazelnuts production takes around 88% of Ordu's arable land, the remainder mainly consists of corn and wheat fields. Whilst covering only 0.1% of the arable land of the province, Ordu's kiwi production is the second largest in the country after Yalova. Beekeeping is also important in Ordu, which produced in 2010 12.8% of honey produced in Turkey.

== Demographics ==
Ordu is the third-largest province (population-wise) on Turkey’s Black Sea coast, after Samsun and Trabzon, and is one of the region’s principal urban and economic centers. With a provincial population of approximately 775,000, Ordu was among the provinces granted metropolitan municipality (Büyükşehir Belediyesi) status during Turkey’s 2012 local government reform.

In addition to the provincial capital, Ordu (Altınordu), the districts of Ünye and Fatsa are also one of the province’s largest and most significant urban centers.

Religion

The population of Ordu is predominantly Sunni Muslim, although a small minority of Alevi communities are also present and continue to maintain their religious and cultural traditions.

Ethnic Groups

The province is primarily inhabited by ethnic Turks, but it is also home to several minority communities. Among the most notable are the Georgian-speaking „Chveneburi“, who are concentrated mainly in the coastal districts, like in Ünye. Many members of this community continue to preserve their cultural heritage, and some still speak the Georgian language.

Migration

In recent decades many people from Ordu have migrated away to jobs in Bursa, Samsun, Sakarya and Istanbul (where almost 525,000 people of Ordu descent live).

Beginning in the early 1970s, many people from Ordu migrated to Europe as guest workers, particularly to Austria (mainly Salzburg and Tyrol) and Germany (especially North Rhine-Westphalia). Many of them settled permanently and continue to live there today.

In the 1970s and 1980s, a significant number of people from Ordu migrated to Japan, particularly to the Nagoya metropolitan area, many of them through illegal migration. Since then, a sizeable Ordu community has developed in the region, with an estimated 7,000 people of Ordu origin living in and around Nagoya today.

== Districts ==
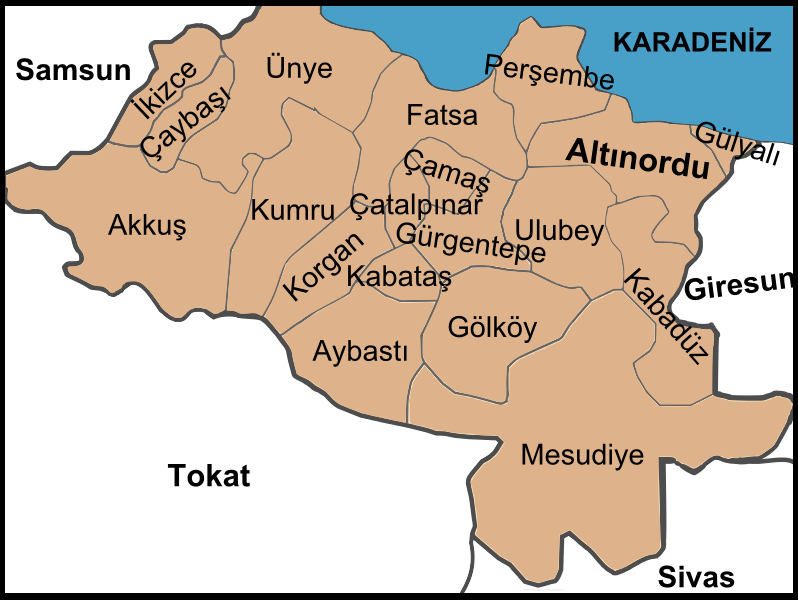
Districts of the Ordu Province

Ordu province is divided into 19 districts:

- Akkuş
- Altınordu
- Aybastı
- Çamaş
- Çatalpınar
- Çaybaşı
- Fatsa
- Gölköy
- Gülyalı
- Gürgentepe
- İkizce
- Kabadüz
- Kabataş
- Korgan
- Kumru
- Mesudiye
- Perşembe
- Ulubey
- Ünye

== Places to see ==
Ordu has an attractive coast including pretty bays and the cleanest and longest beaches on this stretch of the Black Sea coast. Specific sites include: Perşembe Yaylası Aybastı

- Kurul Castle
- Boztepe – a 460 m hill above the city.
- Karagöl – a crater lake at 3107 m, above the plateau of Çambaşı
- Yason (Jason) point – a headland in Perşembe
- Çambaşı Yaylası a high plateau

== Well-known residents ==
- Fikri Sönmez – left-wing mayor of Fatsa in the period leading up to the 1980 Turkish coup d'état
