= Medieval Bulgarian royal charters =

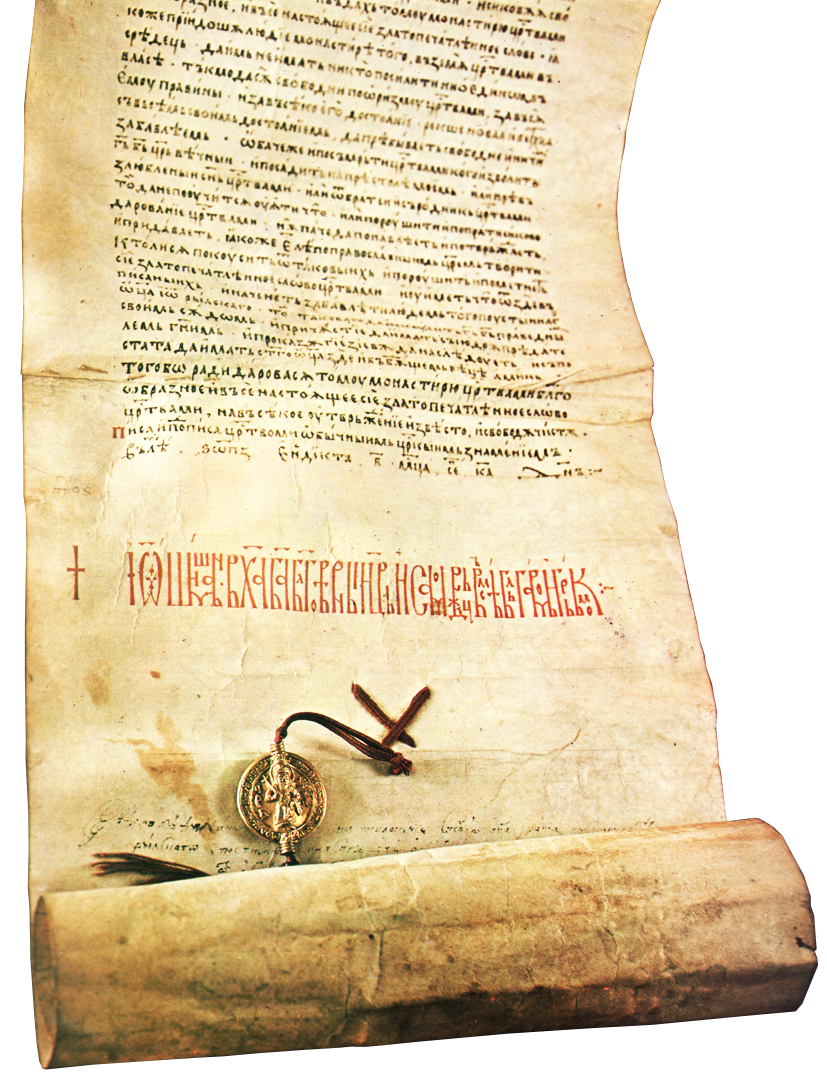
Rila Charter of Ivan Shishman of Bulgaria

The medieval Bulgarian royal charters are some of the few surviving secular documents of the Second Bulgarian Empire, and were issued by five tsars roughly between 1230 and 1380. The charters are written in Middle Bulgarian using the Early Cyrillic alphabet.

== History and details ==
The two earliest Bulgarian royal charters, the Vatopedi Charter given to the Vatopedi monastery on Mount Athos, and the Dubrovnik Charter which permitted Ragusan merchants to trade all over the Bulgarian lands, were issued by Tsar Ivan Asen II of Bulgaria after 1230, and are both undated. The Vatopedi Charter was discovered on Mount Athos in 1929 and the Dubrovnik Charter was found in the archives of Dubrovnik in 1817.

The Virgino Charter, also from the 13th century, was awarded by Tsar Constantine Tikh of Bulgaria to the Monastery of Saint George near Skopje between 1257 and 1777, and was discovered in the Hilandar Monastery. Some researchers consider it a forged document from the late 14th or early 15th century based on the Serbian 14th century Milutin Charter, while others regard it as an original work and believe that it was actually the base for the Milutin Charter.

The royal chancellery of Ivan Alexander of Bulgaria awarded two known charters. These are the Zograf Charter of March 1342, confirming the Zograf Monastery's rights over the village of Hantak, and the Oryahov Charter of 1 December 1348 intended for the Saint Nicholas Monastery in Oryahov near Radomir. The Zograf Charter was found in the Zograf Monastery and the Oryahov Charter, written by the clerk Dobromir, is in the Hilandar Monastery.

Tsar Ivan Shishman of Bulgaria's chancellery also issued two charters. The Rila Charter dates to 21 September 1378 and was given to the Rila Monastery; it was first published in 1845. Its authenticity is also disputed by some scholars due to its forged seal. The Vitosha Charter was awarded to the Holy Mother of God of Vitosha Monastery in Dragalevtsi in the Vitosha mountains near Sofia, and was discovered in the Zograf Monastery, where it is preserved today. It was issued between 1371 and 1385.

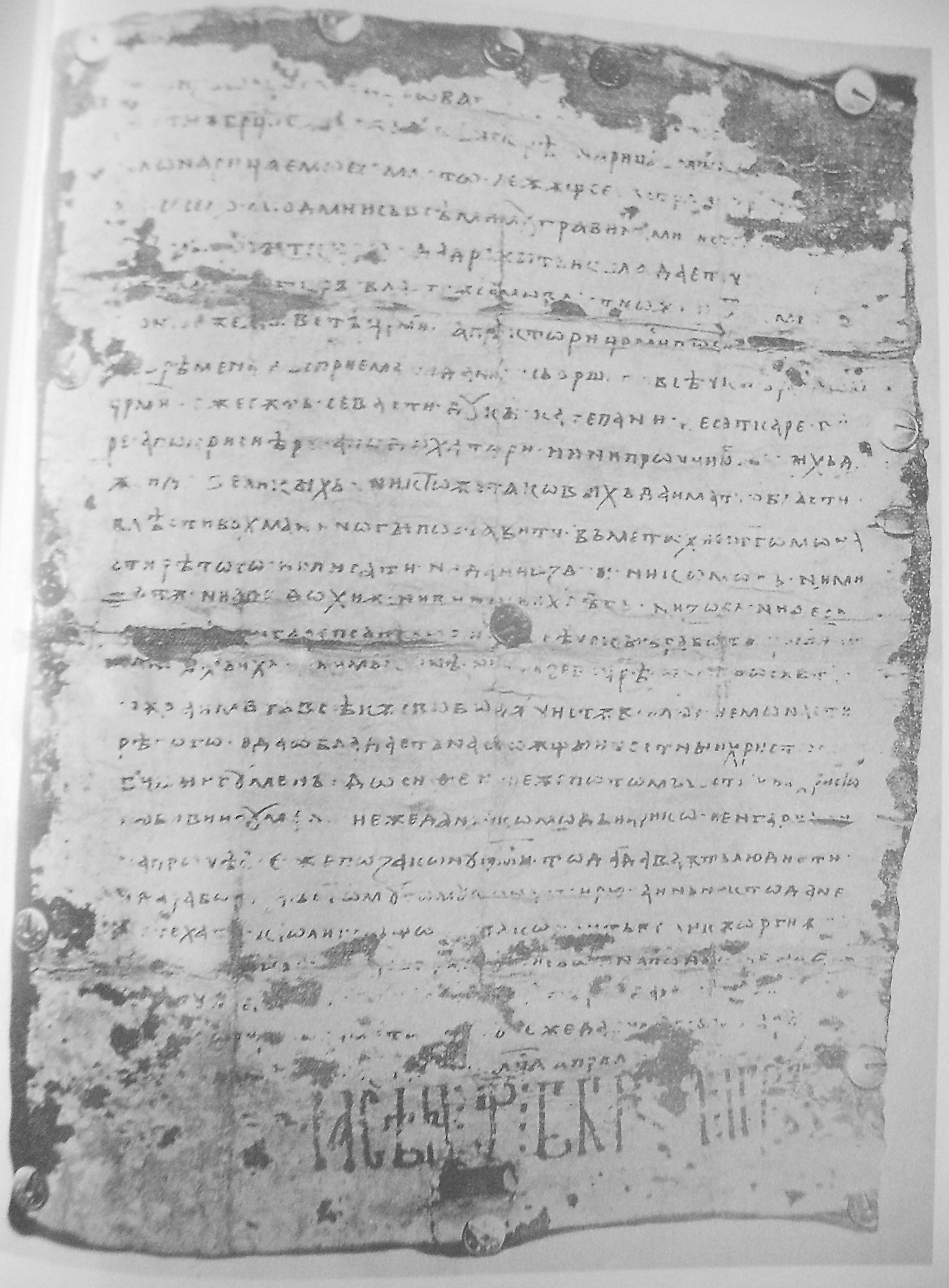
Vatopedi Charter of Ivan Asen II of Bulgaria

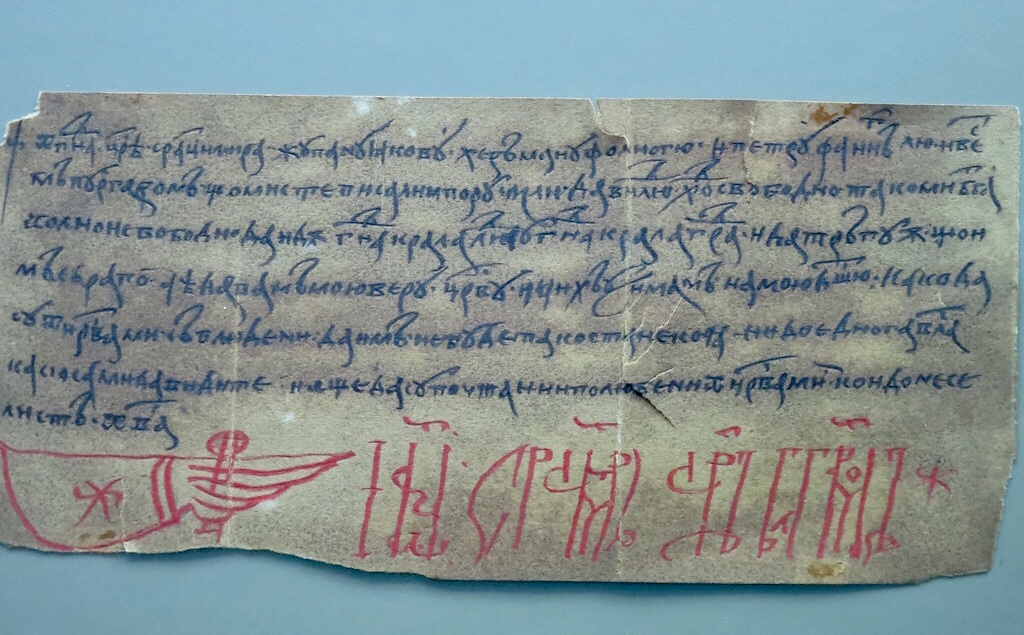
Brasov Charter of tsar Ivan Stratsimir

The chancellery of Tsar Ivan Sratsimir of Bulgaria awarded the Braşov Charter to the city of Kronstadt (modern Braşov) in Transylvania, permitting merchants from the city to trade freely within Ivan Sratsimir's realm centred in Vidin. It has been dated between 1369 and 1380 and is today located in the State Archives in Braşov, Romania.

Although no other charters have been discovered in the original, there is direct evidence of the existence of other charters as well. For example, a charter of Ivan Alexander given to the Venetian doge Andrea Dandolo in Nikopol on 4 October 1352 is kept in a Venetian translation in the archives of Venice. Ivan Alexander's signature has been preserved in its original form in Cyrillic.

== Importance ==
The charters of the medieval Bulgarian rulers are of great importance to several academic disciplines. From a linguistic point of view, they illustrate the changes in the Bulgarian language in the 13th–14th century, such as the gradual disintegration of the case system, and the number and type of loanwords. Being some of the few secular sources on the Bulgarian history in the Middle Ages, the charters are of great interest to the researchers of medieval Bulgarian law, as they list contemporary terms for different forms of taxes, agreements, penalties, etc. Most of the charters also enumerate personal names and toponyms, hinting at the development of the name system among the Bulgarians and confirming the medieval existence of many villages and towns, mostly in modern Bulgaria (largely in and near Rila) and North Macedonia (predominantly around Skopje).

== List ==
- Vatopedi Charter of Ivan Asen II (after 1230)
- Dubrovnik Charter of Ivan Asen II (after 1230)
- Virgino Charter of Constantine Tikh (1257–1277)
- Zograf Charter of Ivan Alexander (March 1342)
- Oryahov Charter of Ivan Alexander (1 December 1348)
- Venetian Charter of Ivan Alexander (4 October 1352)
- Rila Charter of Ivan Shishman (21 September 1378)
- Vitosha Charter of Ivan Shishman (1371–1385)
- Braşov Charter of Ivan Sratsimir (1369–1380)
