= Francesco Dandolo =

Doge of Venice from 1329 to 1339

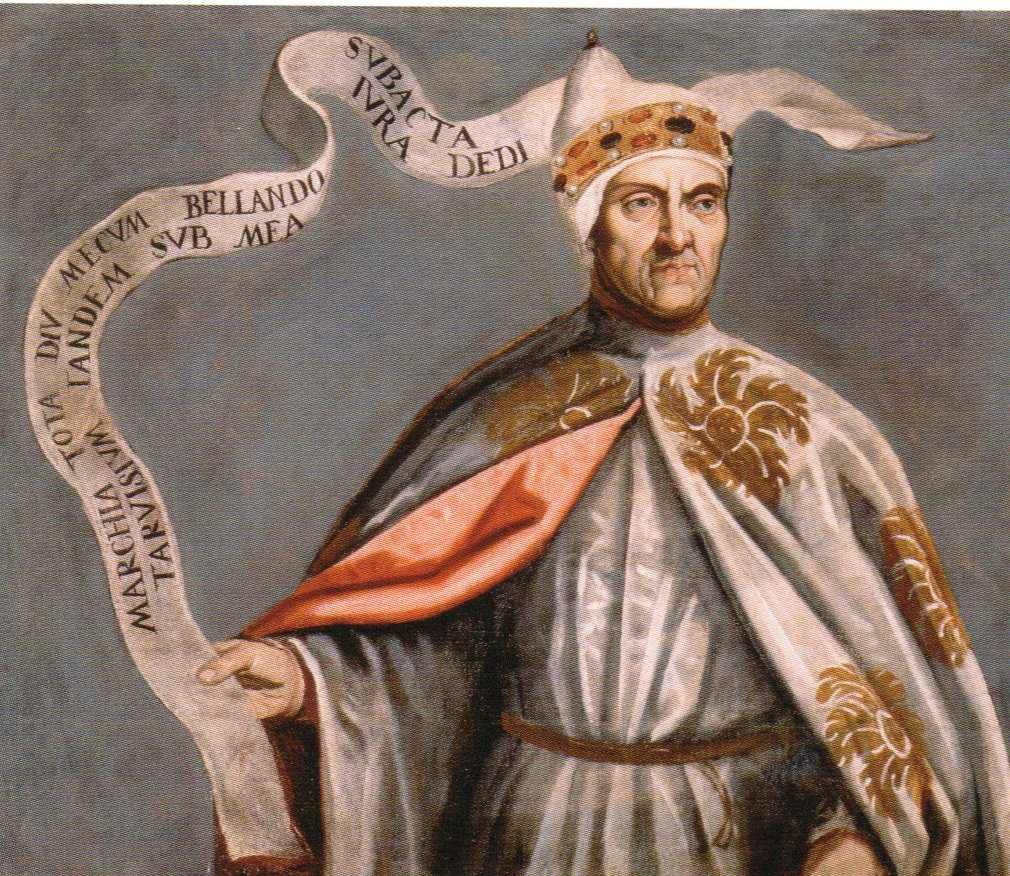

Doge of Venice
- In office 1329–1339
- Preceded by: Giovanni Soranzo
- Succeeded by: Bartolomeo Gradenigo

Personal details
- Born: Unknown
- Died: 1339

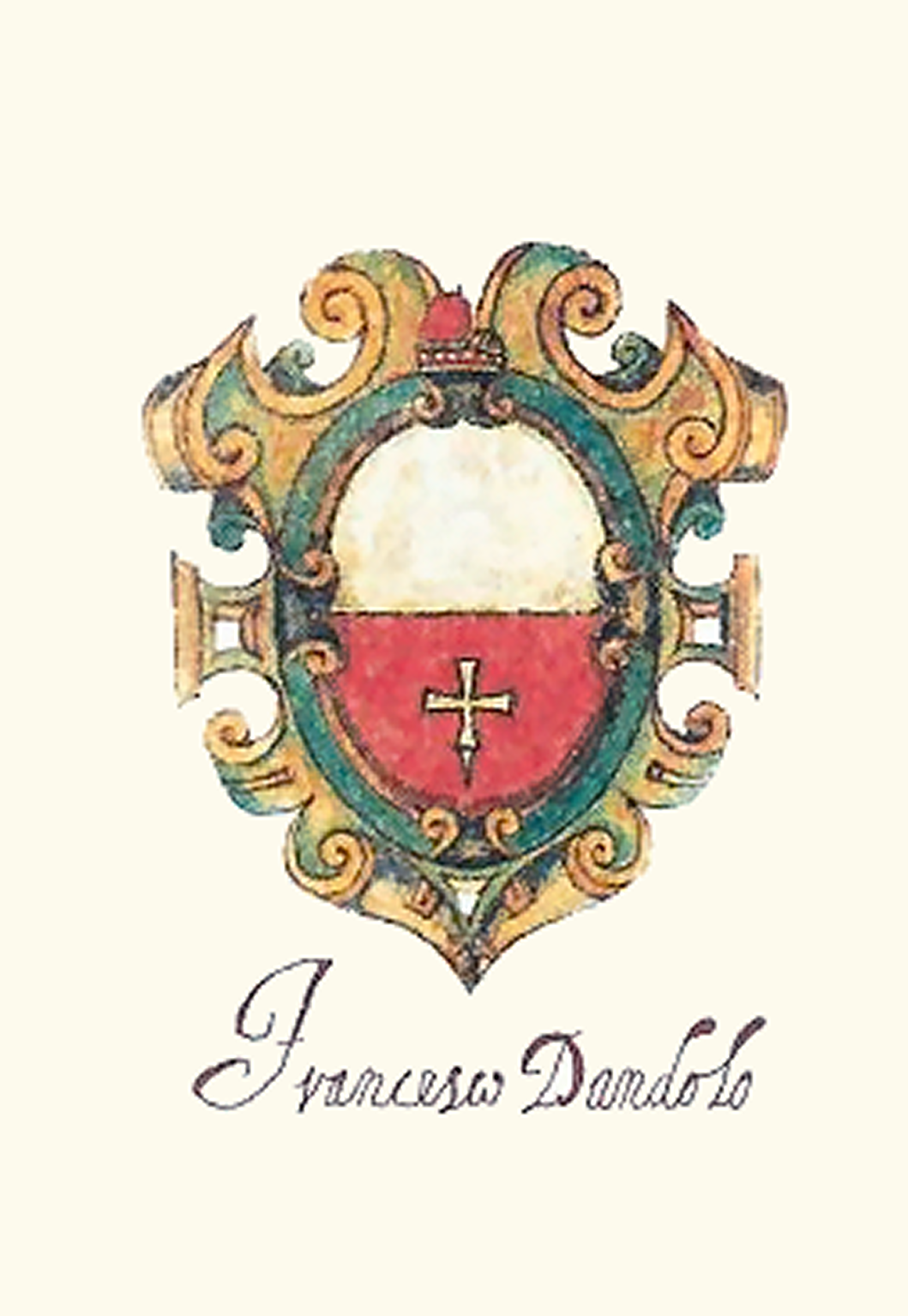
Francesco Dandolo's coat of arms

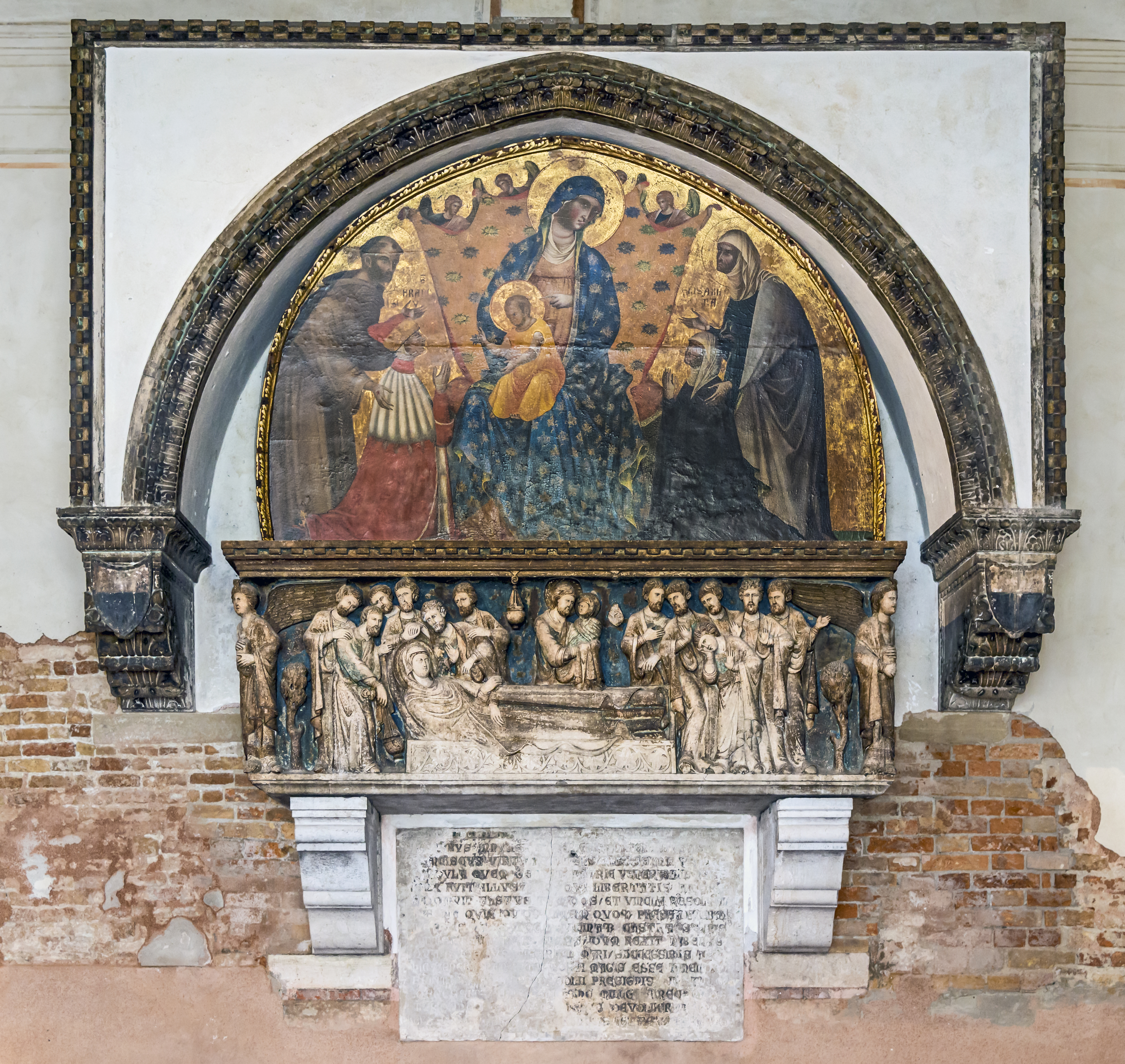
Monument to Doge Francesco Dandolo

Francesco Dandolo (died 1339) was the 52nd Doge of Venice. He ruled from 1329 to 1339. During his reign Venice began its policy of extending its territory on the Italian mainland.

== Family ==
The Dandolo family played an important role in Venetian history from the 12th to the 15th century. Historical references to the family go as far back as the 11th century; however, the family is not considered to be one of the so-called old families (case vecchie) of Venice, as it does not appear on the list of the founding families of Venice. Besides Francesco Dandolo, three other members of the family became doge: Giovanni Dandolo, Andrea Dandolo and Enrico Dandolo. Two women from the family married doges: Giovanna Dandolo to Pasqual Malipiero and Zilia Dandolo to Lorenzo Priuli. Dandolo himself was married to Elisabetta Contarini.

== Life ==
Dandolo was one of the most successful Venetian diplomats. He was the Venetian Ambassador to the popes Pope Clement V and Pope John XXII in Avignon, which at that time hosted the papal residence. Dandolo was nicknamed cane (dog) after an incident in which he presented himself to the pope wearing a chain around his neck in an attempt to get the pope to revoke the excommunication of Venice. Dandolo was married to Eisabetta Contarini and had three children.

=== Doge ===
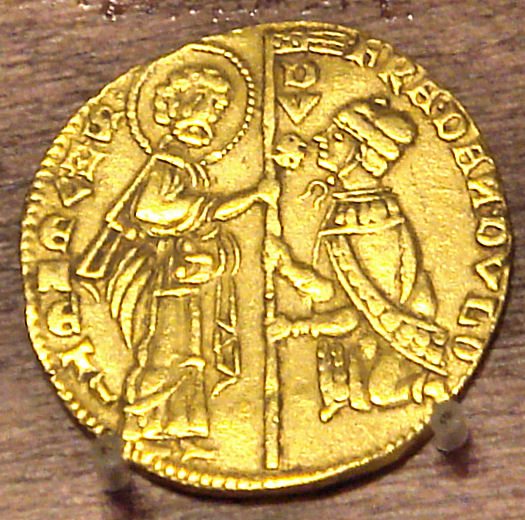
Gold coin of Francesco Dandolo: the Doge kneeling in front of Saint Marc.

During his reign Venice had many skirmishes with the Turks, who would rival Venice for domination of the eastern Mediterranean over the next several centuries.

Venice also engaged in a war with the Lord of Verona, Mastino II della Scala, who continued the territorial politics of his uncle Cangrande I della Scala with the same aggressiveness. The Venetian-occupied cities of Feltre, Belluno und Vicenza were threatened by the Veronese but Venice did not react until the Veronese began to control the flow of river trade and tried to set up a trading base in Chioggia. An alliance was formed between the cities of Venice, Florence, Perugia, Siena, and Bologna in order to counter the threat from Verona.

The battles took place on the entire territory of the Scaligers, with varying results for both sides. Eventually, however, Mastino was defeated. In March 1337 both sides came to a peace agreement after lengthy negotiations that allowed the soldiers to return to their cities and recover their land. Venice received guarantees of free trade for the affected areas.

Mastino, unhappy with the terms of the peace agreement, called upon Emperor Louis IV for help as a mediator, but the emperor sided with the Doge and awarded Venice the rights to the city of Mestre. On 24 January 1339 the peace agreement was sealed in Saint Mark's Basilica in Venice. Treviso now came under the control of Venice, Florence received some castles but not the city of Lucca, which caused resentment in Florence and became one of the causes for the subsequent tensions between Venice and Florence.

Dandolo died on All Saints' Day in 1339. He was interred in the Basilica di Santa Maria Gloriosa dei Frari.

== Bibliography ==
- Da Mosto, Andrea (2003). I dogi di Venezia (in Italian). Florenz. ISBN 88-09-02881-3.
- Rendina, Claudio (1984). I dogi (in Italian). Roma: Storia e segreti. ISBN 88-8289-656-0.

Political offices
Preceded by Giovanni Soranzo	Doge of Venice; 1329–1339	Succeeded by Bartolomeo Gradenigo
