= Storm at Sea =

Painting by Jacopo Palma il Vecchio

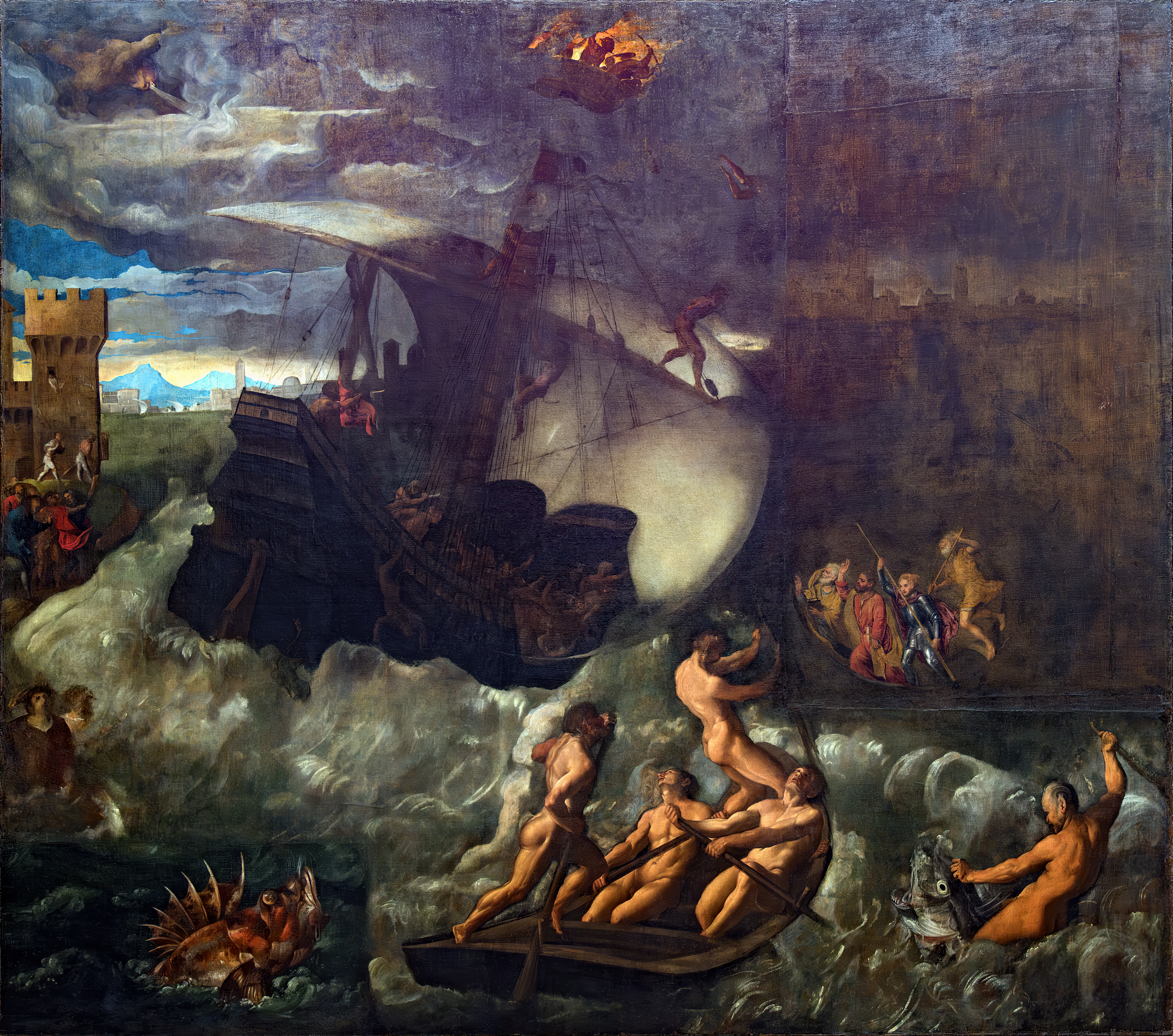
Storm at Sea (c. 1528) by Palma Vecchio

Storm at Sea or Saints Mark, George and Nicholas Freeing Venice from Demons is a c. 1528 oil on canvas painting by Palma Vecchio, now in the Gallerie dell'Accademia in Venice. It was partly completed in 1535 by Paris Bordon after Palma's death.

== History ==
It was commissioned for the sala dell'Albergo in the scuola Grande di San Marco, forming part of a cycle of paintings on the life of Saint Mark, Venice's patron saint, commissioned by the rectors of the congregation from various artists.

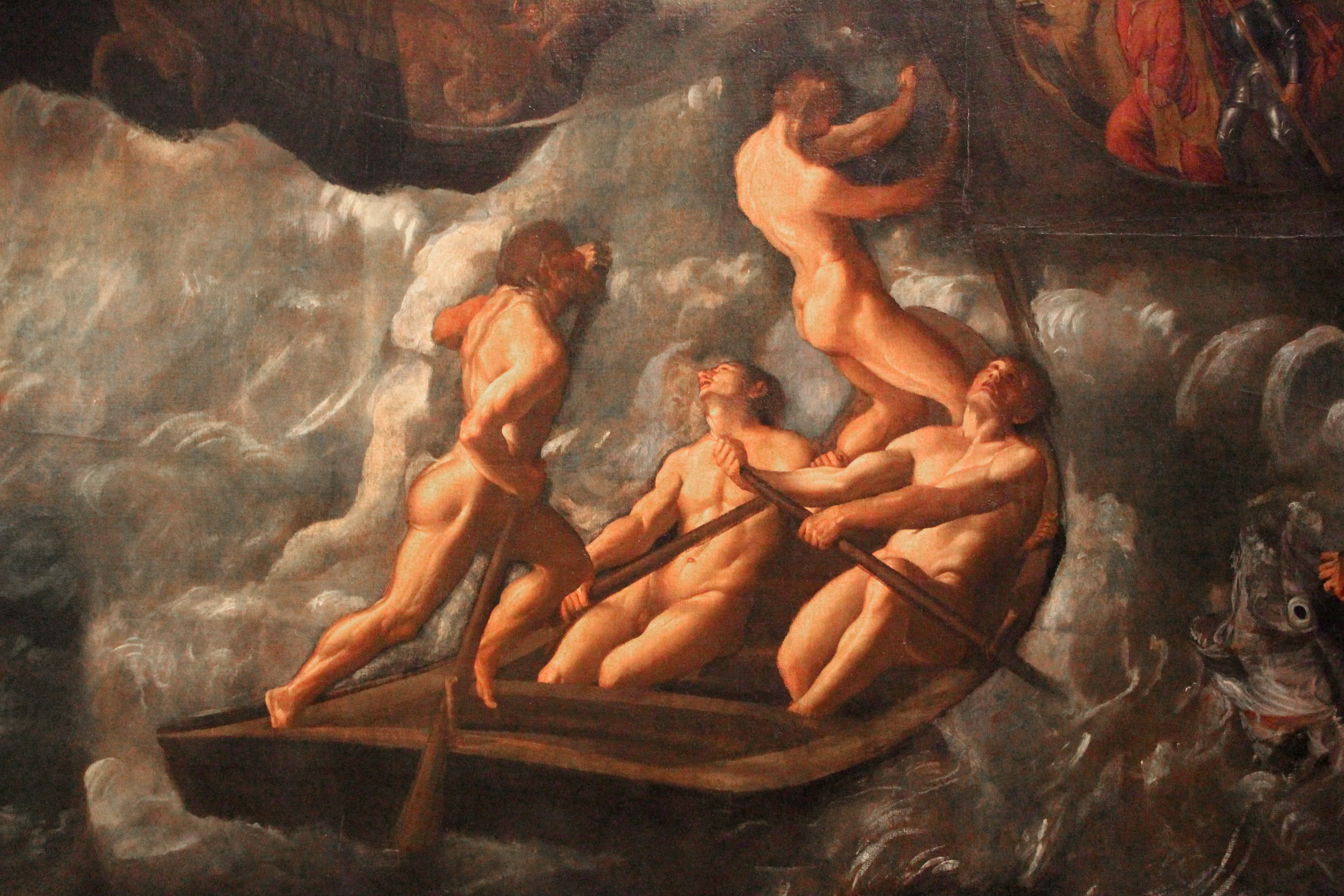
Detail

It was initially commissioned from Giovanni Mansueti, but it was transferred to Palma after Mansueti's death in 1527 - Palma was a member of the scuola from 1513 to 1528. Giorgio Vasari misattributed it to Giorgione, but later attributed it to Palma, though he probably left it unfinished on his death, with Bordon painting the boat.
