= Dubrovnik Charter =

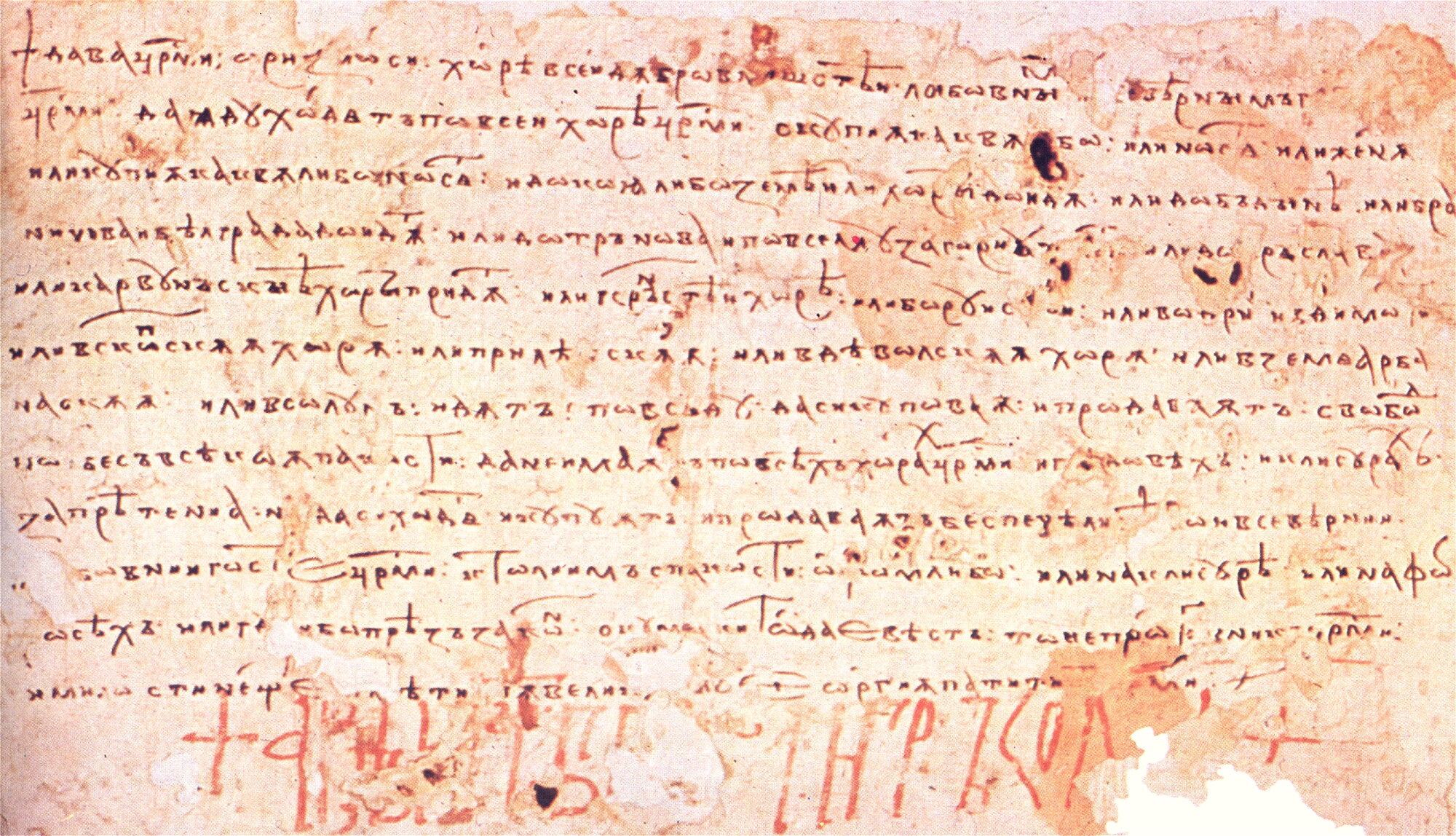
Dubrovnik Charter

The Dubrovnik Charter is a medieval Bulgarian royal charter from 1230, by which the Tsar Ivan Asen II of Bulgaria gives the Dubrovnik merchants the right to trade freely in his country.

The charter contains information about the territorial expansion of the Second Bulgarian State after the Battle of Klokotnitsa, as well as valuable data on the status of the Middle Bulgarian language in the 13th century. It is stored in the handwriting department of the Library of the Russian Academy of Sciences in St. Petersburg.
