= The Presentation of the Ring =

Painting by Paris Bordone

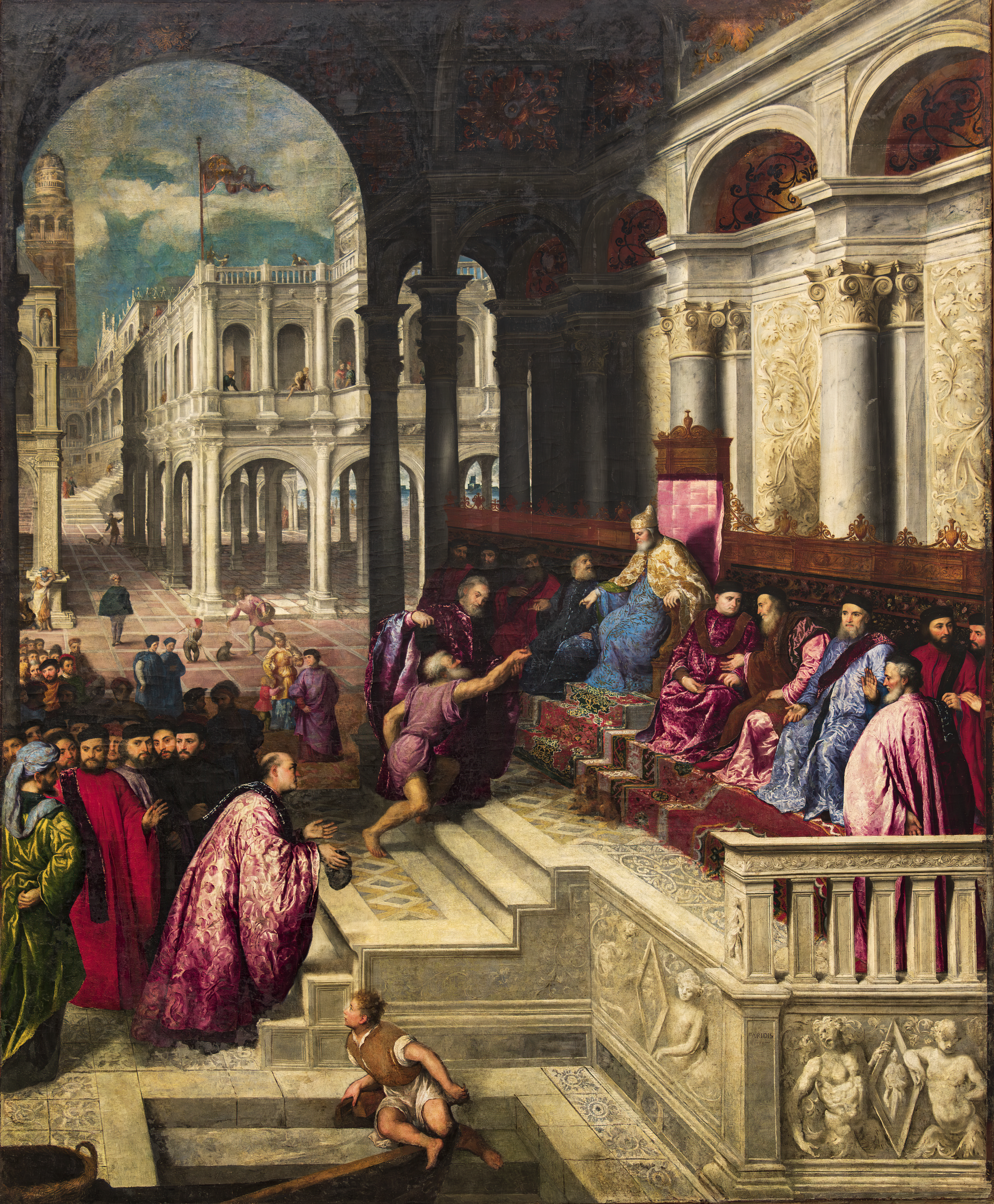
Paris Bordone, Fisherman Presenting a Ring to the Doge Gradenigo (1534). Oil on canvas, 370 by 301 centimetres (145.7 in × 118.5 in). Gallerie dell'Accademia, Venice.

The Fisherman Presenting the Ring to Doge Gradenigo is a 1534 oil-on-canvas painting by the Venetian Renaissance painter Paris Bordone (1495–1570). It was painted in Venice for the confraternity of San Marco in 1540. The painting treats the legend behind the tempest that struck Venice on 15 February 1340. It depicts a gondolier returning the ring of Saint Mark to the Doge Bartolomeo Gradenigo.

The legend states that one night, while the gondolier was sleeping in his gondola, waiting for custom along the canal of S. Giorgio Maggiore, three mysterious individuals jumped into his boat and bade him to take them to the Lido di Venezia. One of the three persons appeared to have the beard of an apostle and the figure of a high dignitary of the Church. The two others, by a certain sound as of armour rubbing beneath their mantles, revealed themselves as men-at-arms. The gondolier turned his prow towards the Lido and began to row; but the lagoon, so tranquil at their departure, began to chop and swell strangely. The waves gleamed with sinister lights; monstrous apparitions were outlined menacingly around the barque, to the great terror of the gondolier. Hideous spirits of evil and devils half-man half-fish seemed to be swimming from the Lido towards Venice, making the waves emit thousands of sparks and exciting the tempest with whistling and fiendish laughter in the storm. The appearance of the shining swords of the two knights and the extended hand of the saintly personage made them recoil and vanish in sulphurous explosions.

The battle lasted for a long time. New demons succeeded the others however; the victory remained with the personages in the boat, who were taken back to the landing of the Piazzetta. The gondolier scarcely knew what to think of their strange conduct; until, as they were about to separate, the oldest of the group, suddenly causing his nimbus to shine out again, said to the gondolier:

"I am Saint Mark, the patron of Venice. I learned tonight that the devils assembled in convention at the Lido in the cemetery of the Jews. They formed a resolution of exciting a frightful tempest and overthrowing my beloved city. This under the pretext that many excesses are committed there which give the evil spirits power over her inhabitants; but as Venice is a good Catholic and will confess her sins in the beautiful cathedral which she has raised to me, I resolved to defend her from this peril of which she was ignorant, by the aid of these two brave companions, Saint George and Saint Theodore. I have borrowed thy boat; now, as all trouble merits reward, and as thou hast passed a boisterous night, here is my ring; carry it to the Doge and tell him what thou hast seen. He will fill thy cap with golden sequins."

The Saint resumed his position on the top of the porch of Saint Mark's Basilica, Saint Theodore climbed to the top of his column, where his crocodile was grumbling with ill-humour, and Saint George went to squat in the depths of his columned niche in the great window of the Ducal Palace.

The gondolier, rather astonished, would have believed that he had been dreaming after drinking several glasses of the wine of Samos, if the large and heavy golden ring studded with precious stones which he held in his hand had not prevented his doubting the reality of the events of the night.

Therefore, he went to find the Doge, who was presiding over the Senate. Respectfully kneeling before him, he related the story of the battle between the devils and the patron saints of Venice. At first the story seemed incredible; but the return of the ring, which was that of Saint Mark, and the absence of which from the church treasury was established, proved the gondolier's veracity. This ring was locked under triple keys in a carefully guarded treasury, the bolts of which showed no trace of disturbance and could only have been removed by supernatural means. They filled the gondolier's cap with gold and celebrated a mass of thanksgiving for the peril they had escaped. This did not prevent the Venetians from continuing their dissolute course of life, from spending their nights in the haunts of play; at gay suppers, in love-making, in masking for intrigues, and in prolonging the long orgy of their carnival for six months in the year. The Venetians counted upon the protection of Saint Mark to go to paradise, and they took no other care of their salvation. That was Saint Mark's affair; they had built him a fine church for that, and the Saint was still under obligations to them.
