= Dragalevtsi Monastery =

Coordinates: 42°37′10″N 23°17′57″E

Dragalevtsi Monastery of the Holy Mother of God of Vitosha
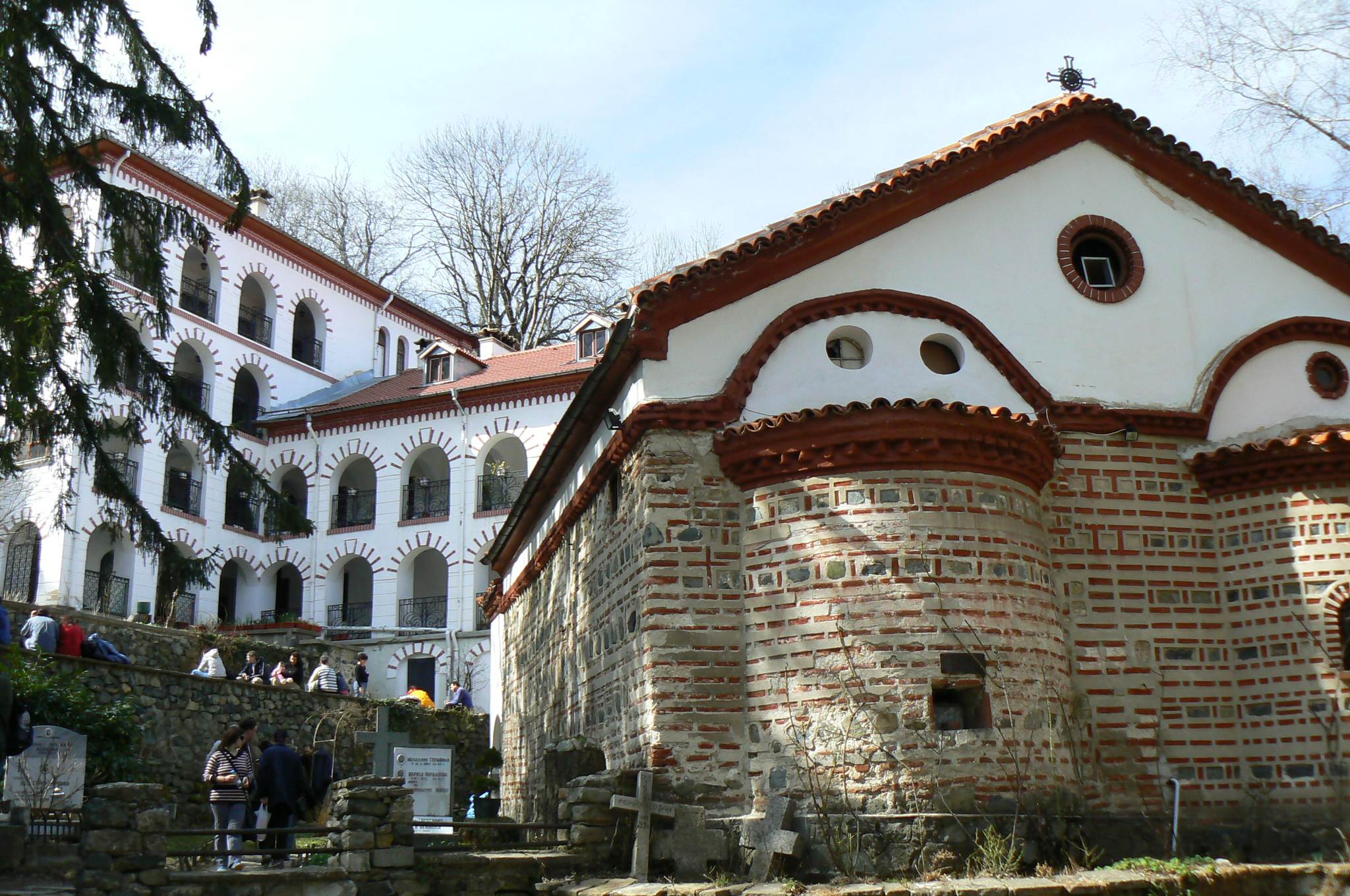
- The yard of Dragalevtsi Monastery
- Interactive map of Dragalevtsi Monastery of the Holy Mother of God of Vitosha

Monastery information
- Order: Eastern Orthodox
- Established: 1345

People
- Founder: Emperor Ivan Alexander of Bulgaria

Site
- Location: Vitosha Mountain, Bulgaria

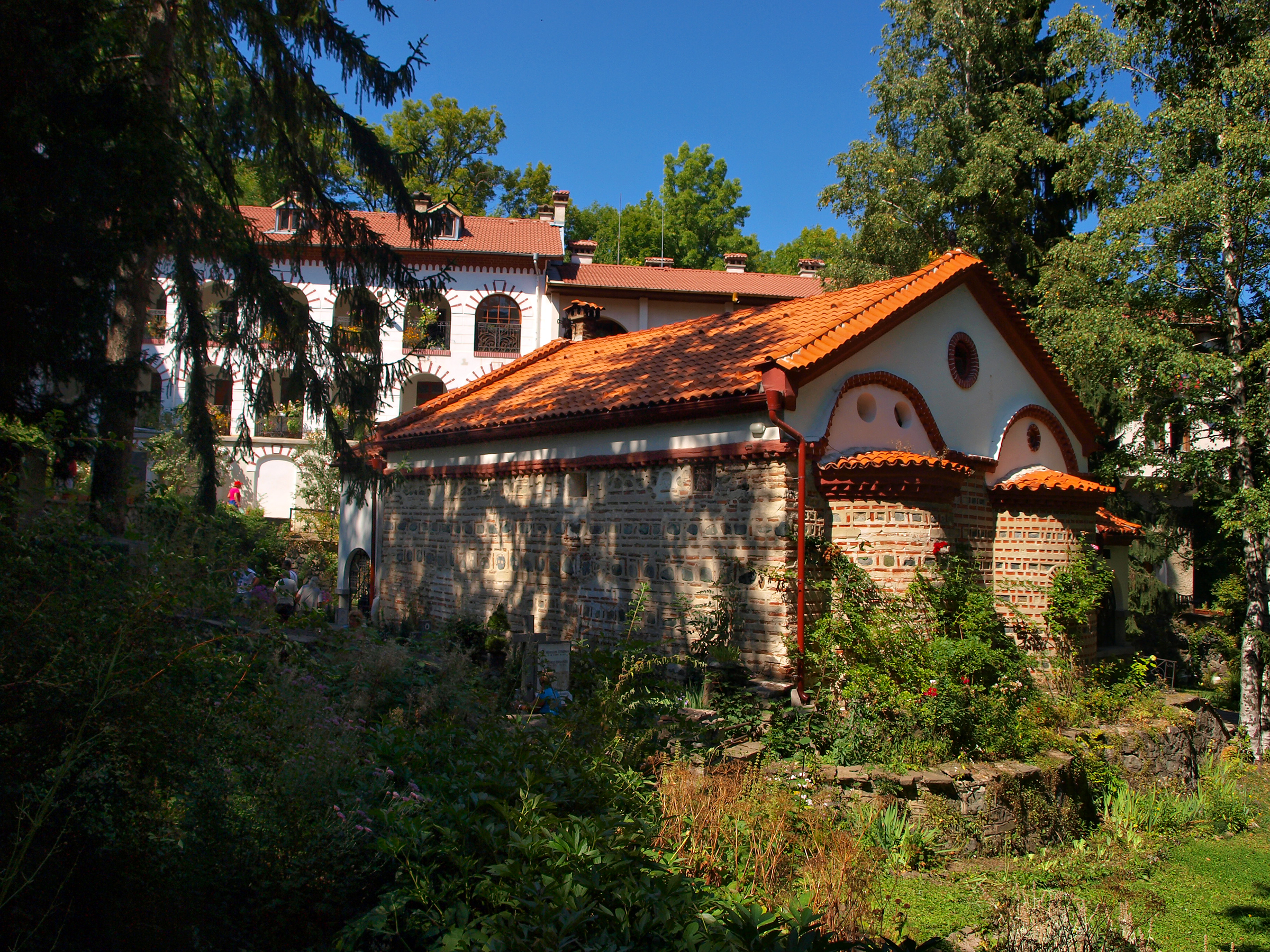
The church of Dragalevtsi Monastery with the living quarters in the background

Dragalevtsi Monastery of the Holy Mother of God of Vitosha (Bulgarian: Драгалевски манастир „Света Богородица Витошка“, Dragalevski manastir „Sveta Bogoroditsa Vitoshka“) is a Bulgarian Orthodox monastery on the lower slopes of Vitosha mountain on the outskirts of the capital Sofia in western Bulgaria. Founded in the mid-14th century by Bulgarian tsar Ivan Alexander, the monastery was abandoned after the Ottoman conquest of Sofia and reestablished in the late 15th century, when it became an important literary centre. The monastery church and some of its frescoes date from this period.

== History ==
Located 3 kilometres (1.9 miles) south of the capital Sofia's neighbourhood of Dragalevtsi, Dragalevtsi Monastery was established by Tsar Ivan Alexander (r. 1331–1371) in 1345 at the time of the Second Bulgarian Empire. The monastery was first mentioned in the Vitosha Charter issued before 1382 by Tsar Ivan Shishman (r. 1371–1395). The charter granted lands and tax exemptions to Dragalevtsi Monastery, including ownership of the village of Novachene.

After Sofia fell to the Ottomans in 1382, the monastery was disbanded and its buildings destroyed. It was rebuilt in the second half of the 15th century with the financial support of local feudal lord Radoslav Mavar and rapidly developed into a repository of Bulgarian cultural records. In 1612, while staying at Dragalevtsi Monastery, the monk Job Kasinets from Timișoara wrote the Boyana Beadroll, a list of medieval Bulgarian rulers. The document shows the extent to which medieval rulers were remembered in 17th-century Bulgarian lands. Other manuscripts completed in this period at the monastery's scriptorium include Priest Nicholas' Gospel of 1469, the Dragalevtsi Gospel of 1534 and a psalter finished in 1598.

Today only the monastery church survives from what was a significantly more extensive complex of buildings in the 15th century. The church was expanded in 1818 and 1932. In the late 19th century, Dragalevtsi Monastery was often visited by national hero Vasil Levski, who used it as a centre for his revolutionary activities. The monastery is currently inhabited by nuns.

== Art ==
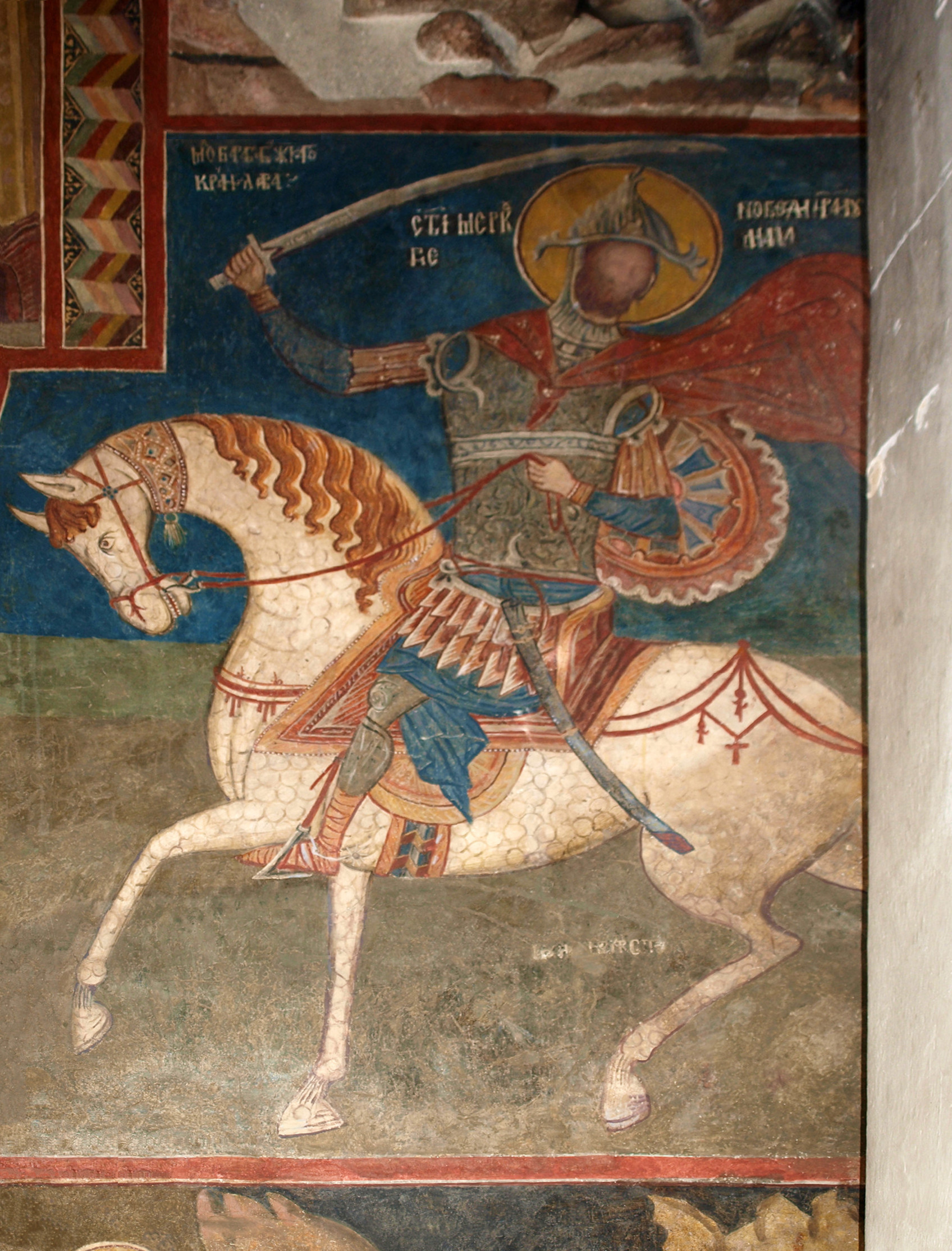
Fresco of Saint Mercurius on the exterior of the west wall of the church

The monastery church, eponymously known as the Church of the Holy Mother of God, measures 12 by 5 metres (39 ft × 16 ft). It has a single apse and a single nave. Architecturally, it shares many features with other contemporary churches in the Sofia region, including the Church of St Petka of the Saddlers in the city and the church of the Kremikovtsi Monastery.

Mural portraits of Radoslav Mavar and his immediate family as church donors (ktetors) were painted on the inside of the monastery church. In addition to these, other 15th-century frescoes also survive, alongside 16th- and 17th-century paintings. The frescoes of warrior saints Demetrius of Thessaloniki, George and Mercurius on the upper reaches of the west facade date to 1475–1476. The saints are clad in realistically painted full knight's armour of the period, with Demetrius and Mercurius wearing spurs. One of the murals depicts Demetrius battling Bulgarian tsar Kaloyan (r. 1197–1207), who is shown as an enemy of the faith. The iconostasis of the church was carved and installed in the 18th century. The icons in the church are the work of 19th-century Samokov Art School painter Nikola Obrazopisov.
