= Bartolomeo Gradenigo =

Doge of Venice from 1339 to 1342

His Serenity Bartolomeo Gradenigo
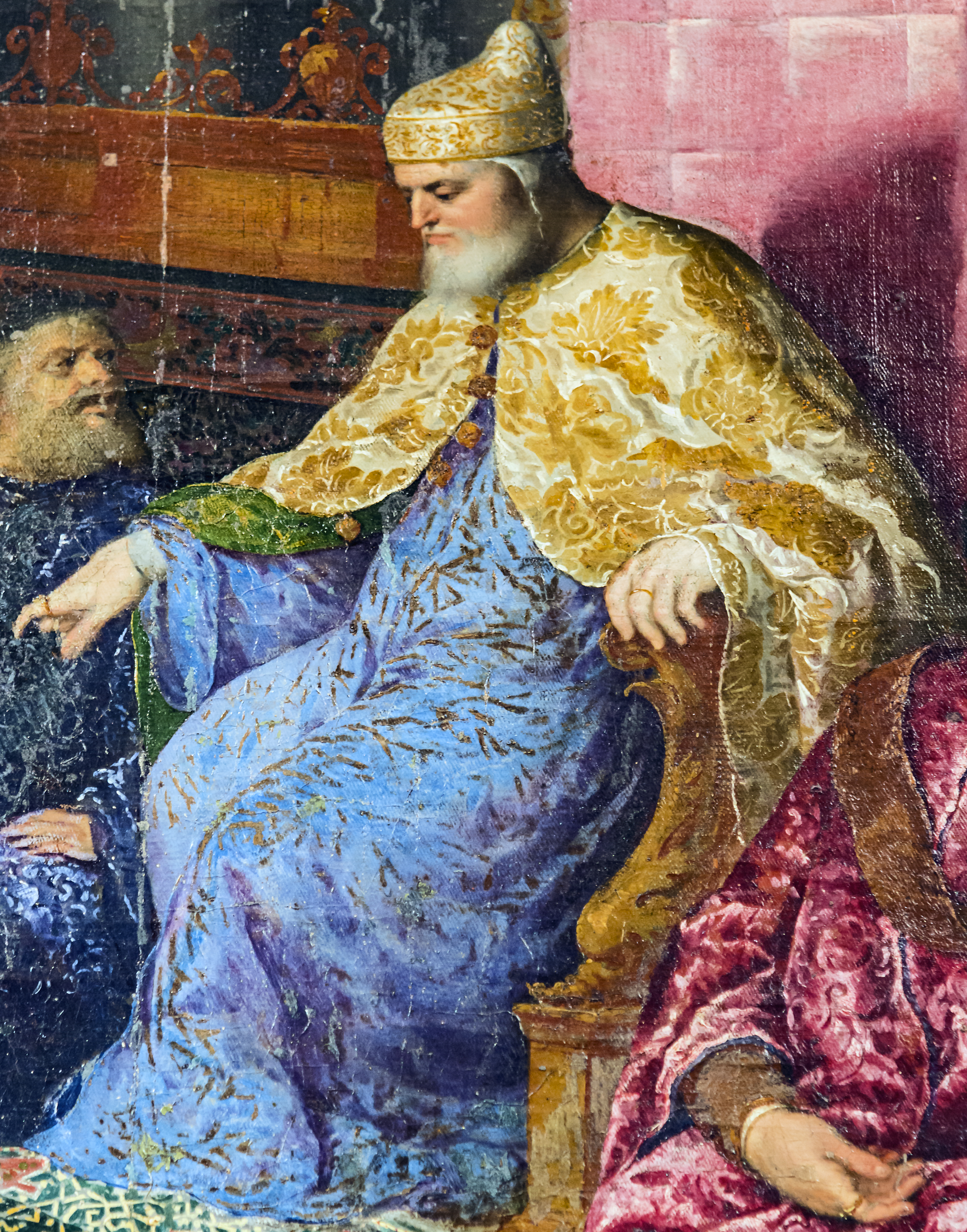
- Bartolomeo Gradenigo by Paris Bordone

53rd Doge of Venice
- In office 7 November 1339 – 28 December 1342
- Preceded by: Francesco Dandolo
- Succeeded by: Andrea Dandolo

Personal details
- Born: 1263
- Died: 28 December 1342 (aged 78–79) Republic of Venice
- Resting place: St Mark's Basilica

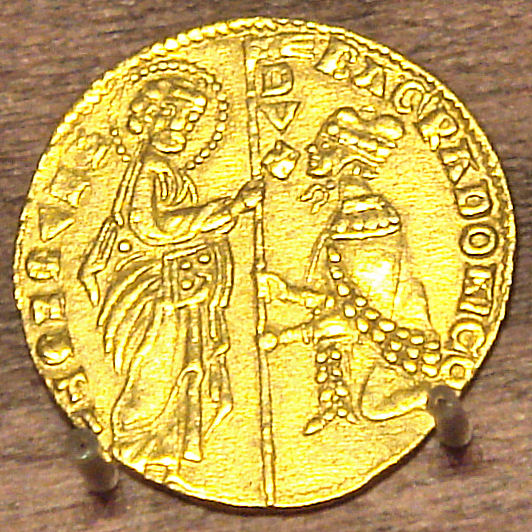
Gold coin of Bartolomeo Gradenigo: the Doge kneeling in front of Saint Marc.

Bartolomeo Gradenigo (1263 – 28 December 1342) was the 53rd Doge of Venice from 7 November 1339 until his death on 28 December 1342.

Born in Venice to an ancient noble family, he was a rich tradesman. Gradenigo devoted to politics very early in his life, acting as podestà of Ragusa and Capodistria, as well as procuratore in the capital. He also became soon renowned for his excessive love for luxury. He married three times and had six children. One of his spouses was Giustina Capello.

His short reign was rather peaceful, apart from a revolt in Crete and some Turkish incursions. It was also characterized by some diplomatic moves towards Genoa. The most important event was the tempest that struck against Venice on 15 February 1340 and which, according to legend, was pushed back only through the supernatural intercession of St. Mark, St. George and St. Nicholas, brought to the lagoon by a humble fisherman. After the storm had disappeared, the three saints gave the fisherman a ring, called "Ring of the Fisherman", which he gave to the doges and has since then been part of the ducal jewelry. Bartolomeo appears in the painting The Presentation of the Ring by Paris Bordone which shows the fisherman presenting the ring to him.

== Sources ==
- Claudio Rendina, I dogi di Venezia, Newton Compton, Rome, 1984.

Political offices
Preceded by Francesco Dandolo	Doge of Venice; 1339–1342	Succeeded by Andrea Dandolo
