= Peshtera Monastery =

Coordinates: 42°30′39″N 22°46′0″E

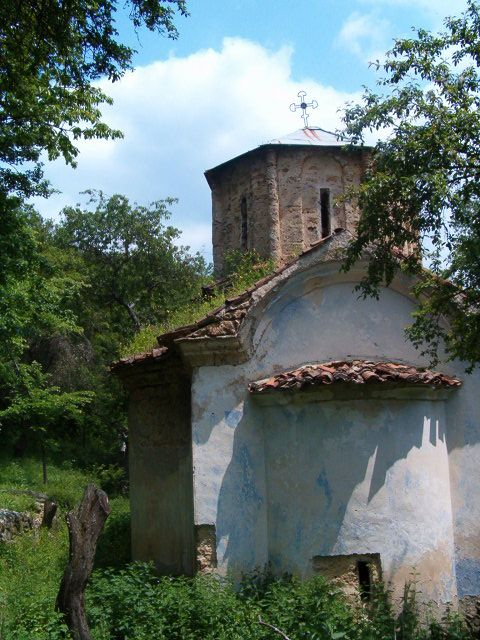
Rear view of the old church

The Peshtera Monastery of Saint Nicholas of Myra (Bulgarian: Пещерски манастир „Свети Николай Мирликийски”, Peshterski manastir „Sveti Nikolay Mirlikiyski”), also known as the Mraka Monastery (Мрачки манастир, Mrachki manastir) or Oryahov Monastery (Оряховски манастир, Oryahovski manastir) is a medieval Eastern Orthodox monastery in western Bulgaria, located in the Mraka area at the village of Peshtera, near Zemen, Pernik Province. As of 2008, the monastery is not operative.

The monastery was first mentioned in Tsar Ivan Alexander of Bulgaria's Oryahov Charter of 1 December 1348, which indicated that that particular tsar of the Second Bulgarian Empire had donated to the monastery. According to some researchers, the eastern part of the modern church dates to the 14th century, while others claim it belongs to the Mount Athos architectural type and is similar to Greek churches of the 16th-17th century, as well as the church of the nearby Poganovo monastery in what is today Serbia dated to 1500.

The Peshtera Monastery was abandoned during the Ottoman rule of Bulgaria. It was only renovated in 1842 by Dimitar Molerov of the Bansko artistic school, with the financial aid of the monk Simeon and his son. During the liberational Russo-Turkish War of 1877-1878, however, it was burned by the retreating Ottoman troops who hanged Simeon, with his son fleeing to the Rila Monastery.

After the Liberation of Bulgaria, a prolonged cella was added to the old church and it was turned into the altar part. The new entrance from the west was designed as a three-arched portico with an arc-shaped pediment featuring a round window. A statue of the Ancient Roman god Mithras was unearthed during the reconstruction, leading to the assumption that a pre-Christian sanctuary existed at that place. Until the early 1990s, the monastery had a stone icon of Saint Nicholas made in 1853 by master Stoimen of Lobosh, but it has disappeared.

== Gallery ==
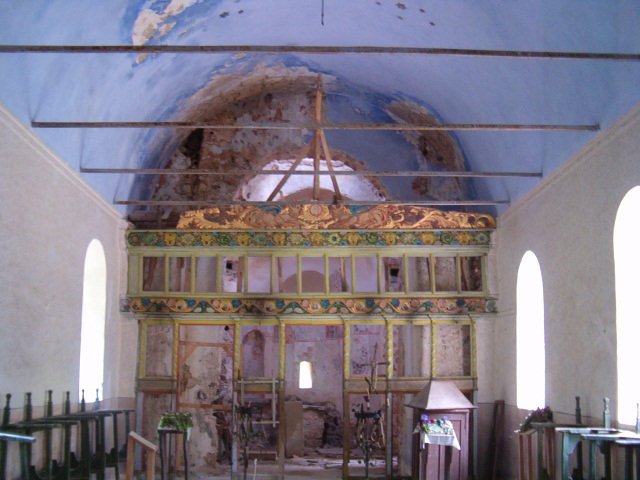
Church interior

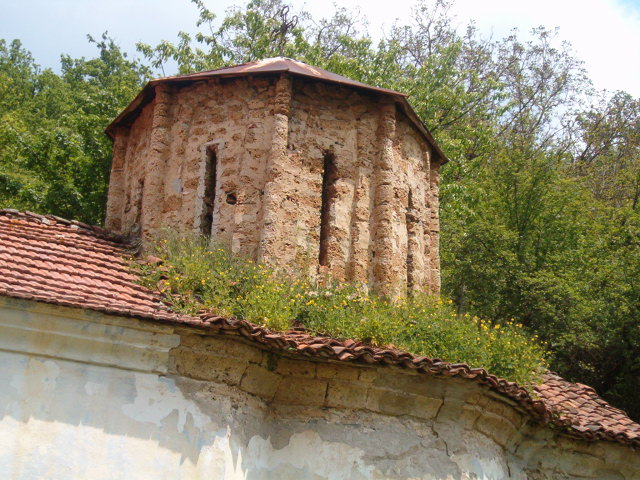
Church dome

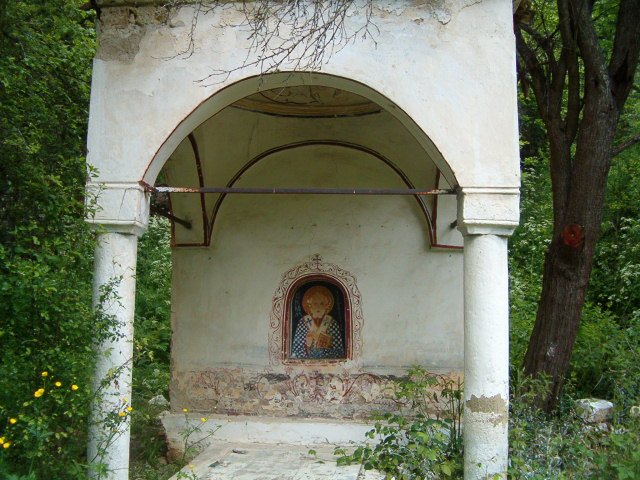
Monastery yard

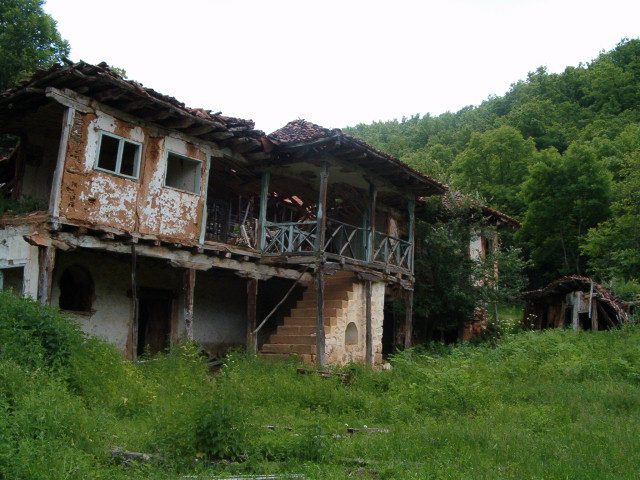
Residential buildings burned by the Turks

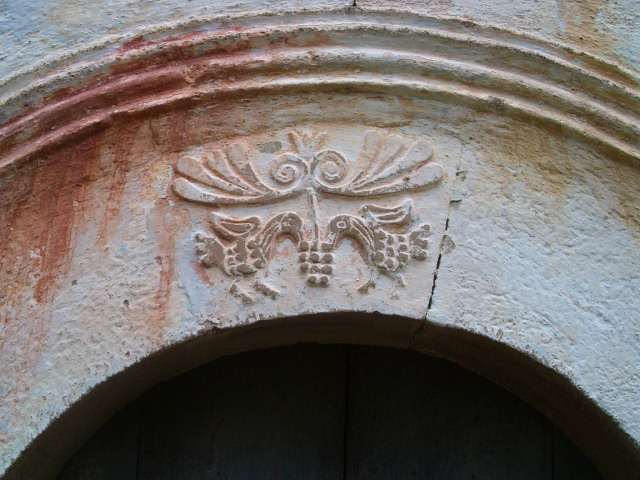
Detail of the frieze decoration
