= Paris Bordone =

Italian painter of the Venetian Renaissance

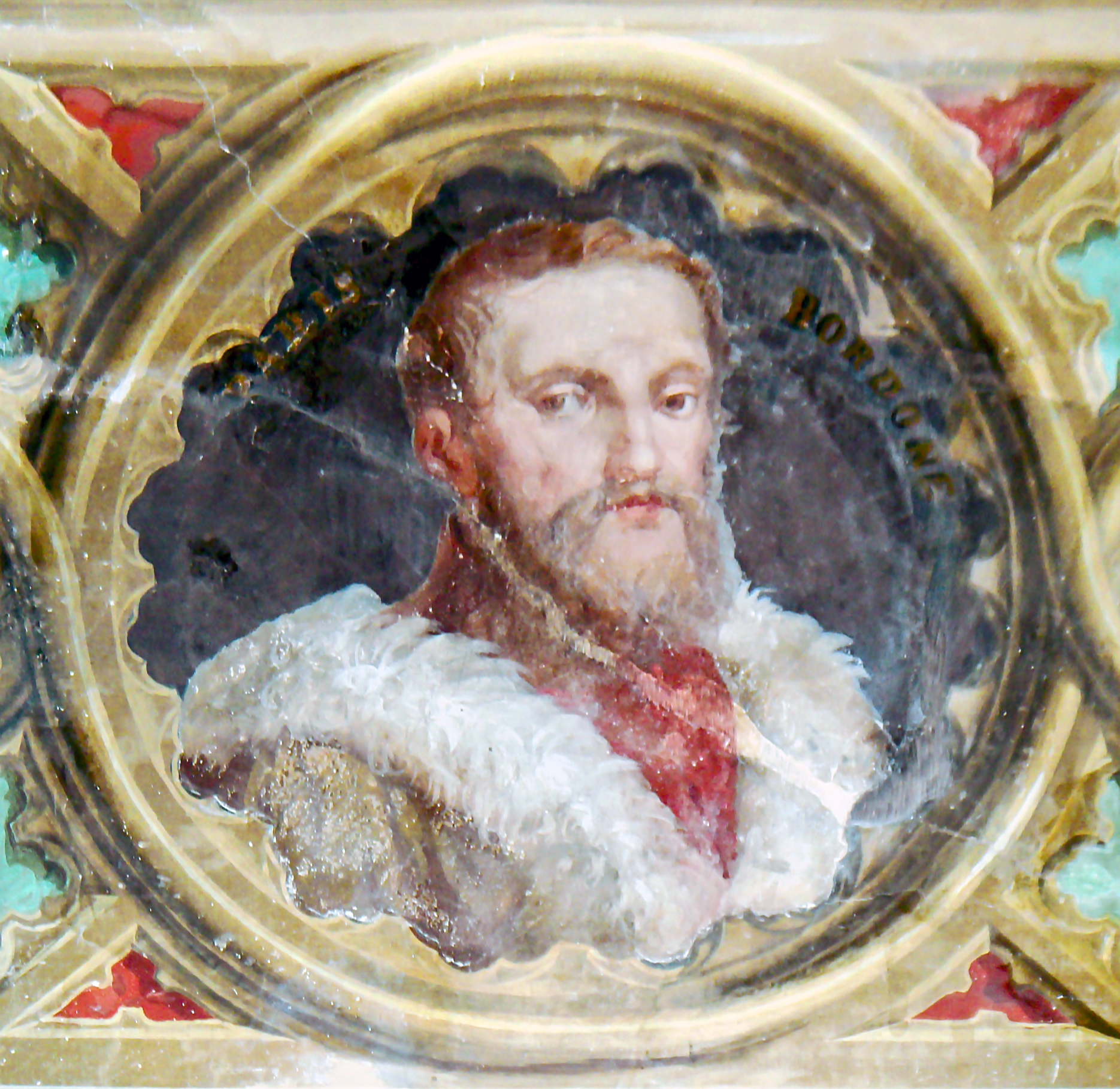
Paris Bordone

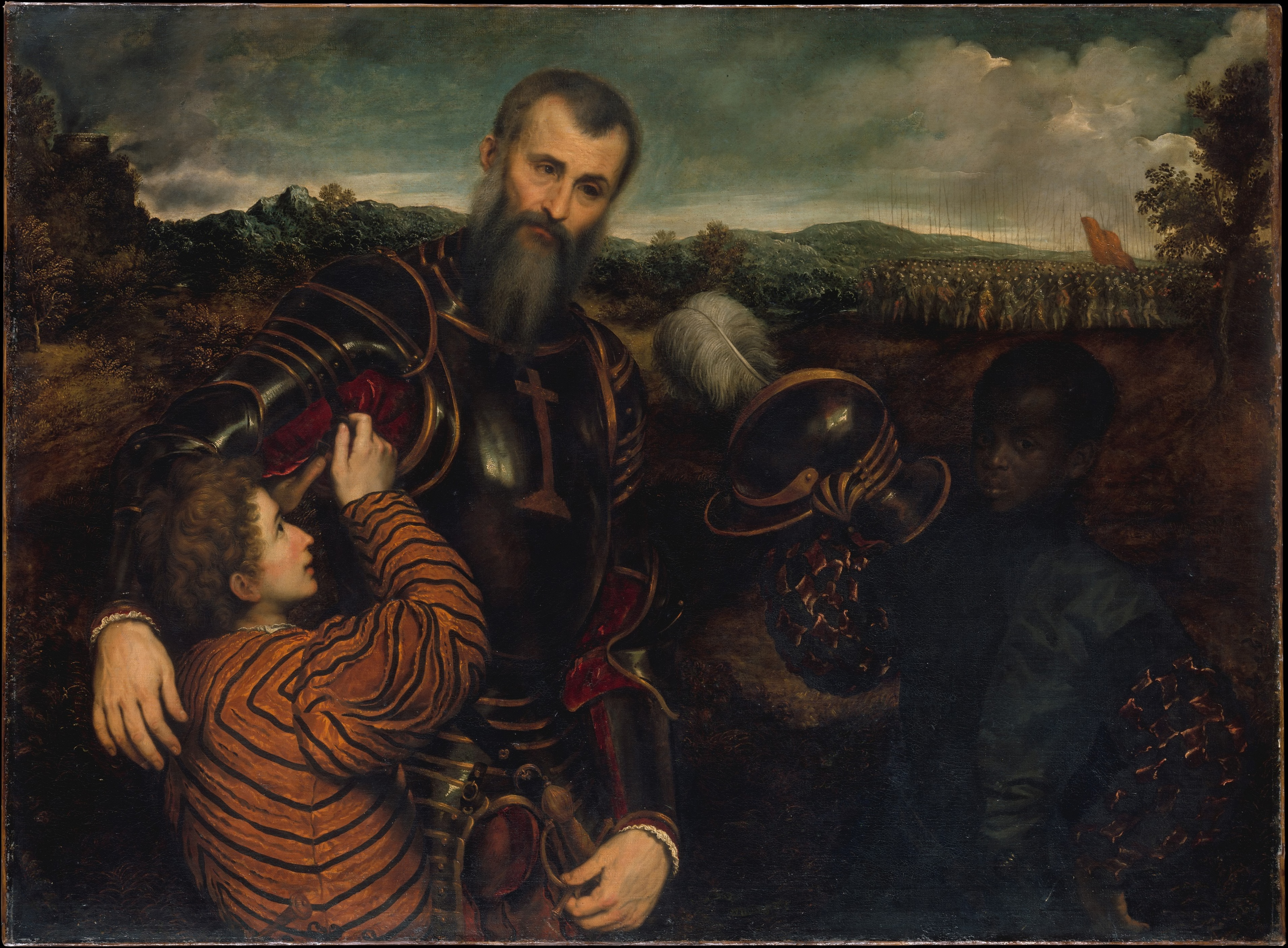
Portrait of a Gentleman in armor with two pages. Oil on canvas. between 1520 and 1571, Metropolitan Museum of Art.

Paris Bordone (Paris Paschalinus Bordone; 5 July 1500 – 19 January 1571) was an Italian painter of the Venetian Renaissance who, despite training with Titian, maintained a strand of Mannerist complexity and provincial vigor.

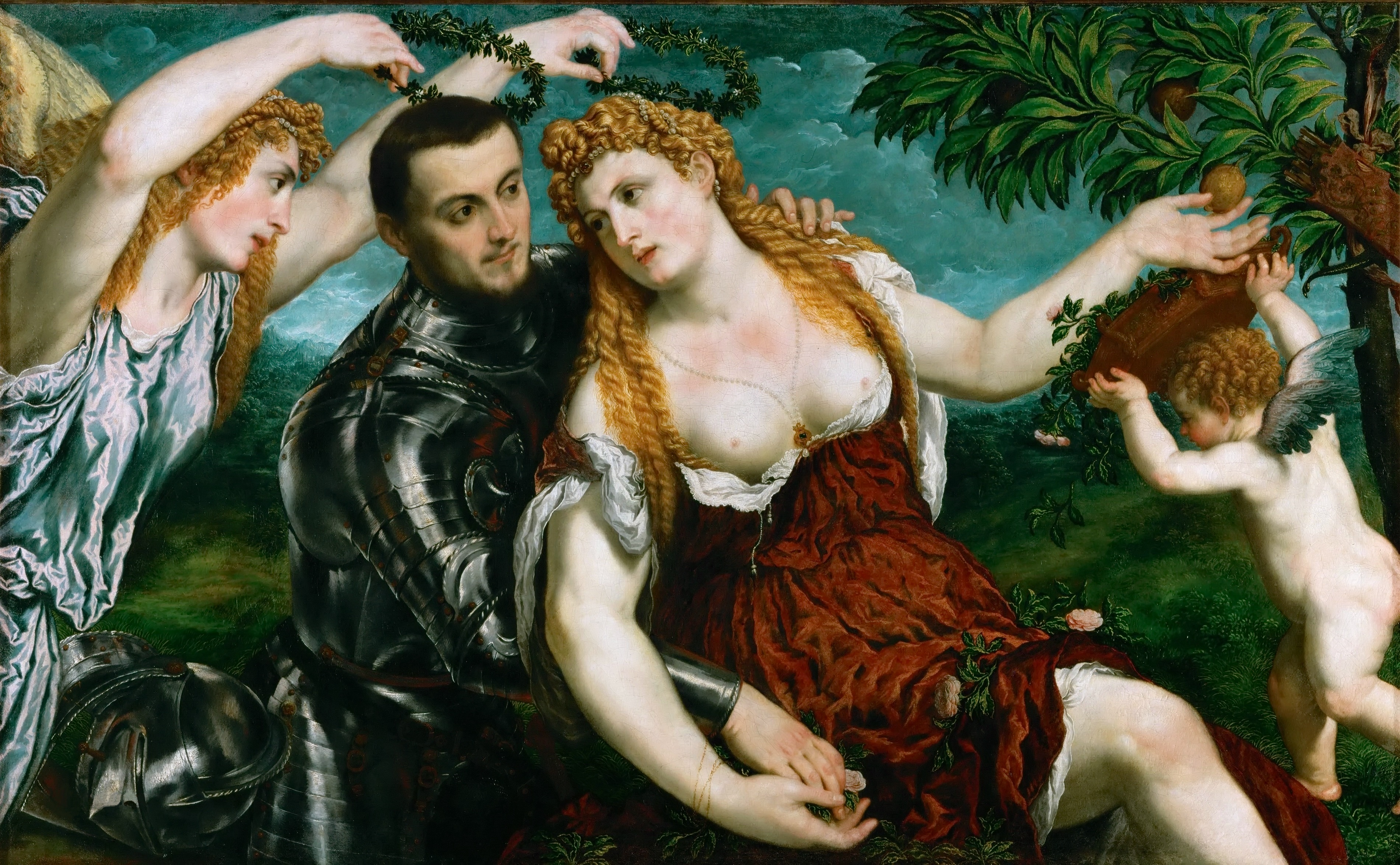
Venus, Mars, and Cupid crowned by Victory, c. 1560

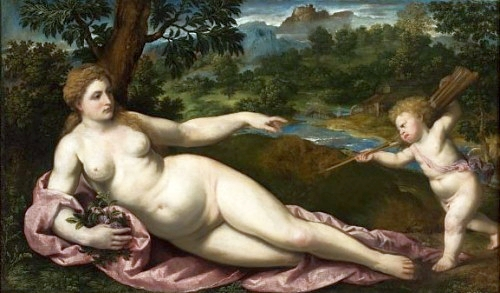
Venus and Amor, 1545–1550, imagination of an idealized beauty in the form introduced by Giorgione that once belonged to Adolf Hitler, National Museum in Warsaw

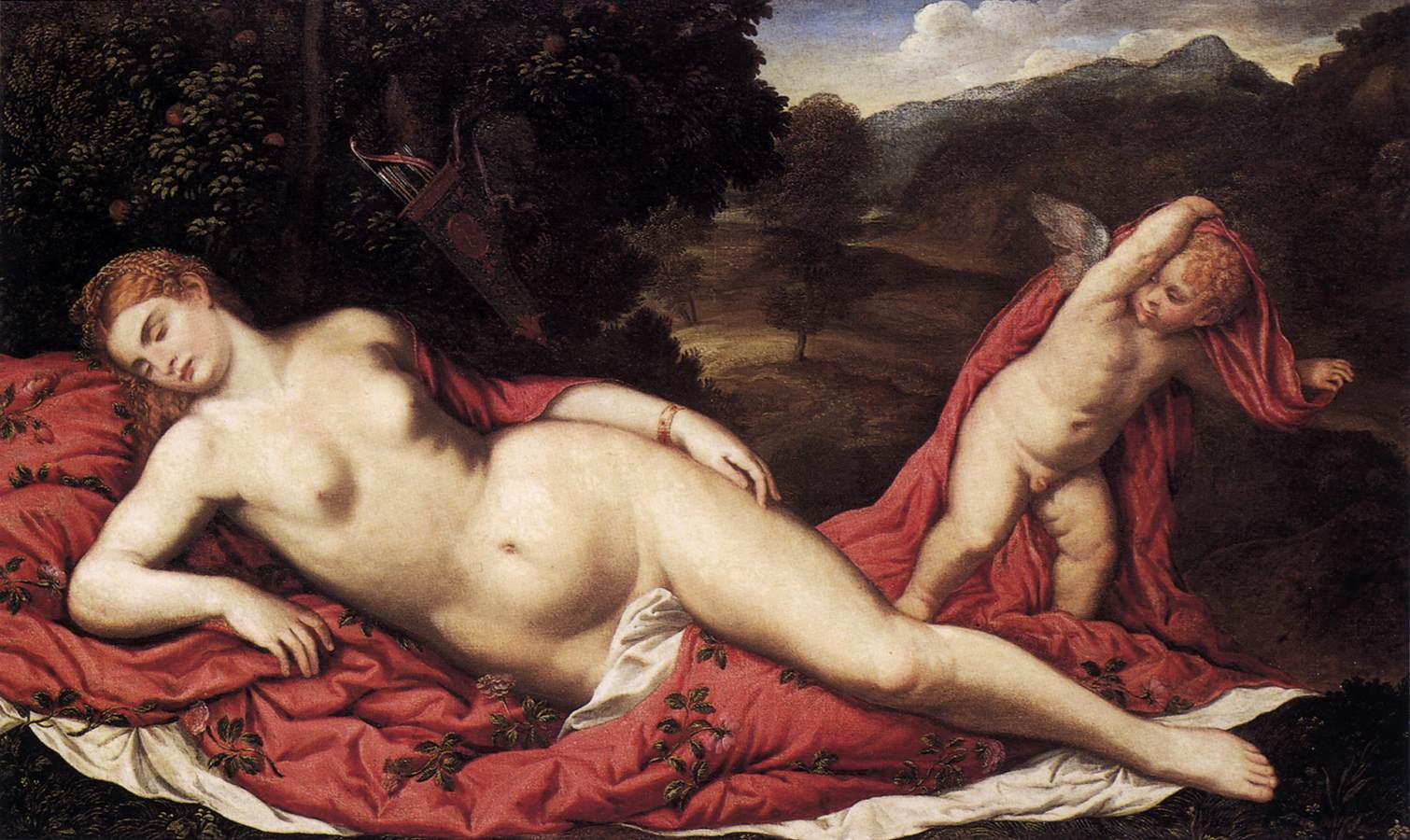
Sleeping Venus with Cupid

== Biography ==
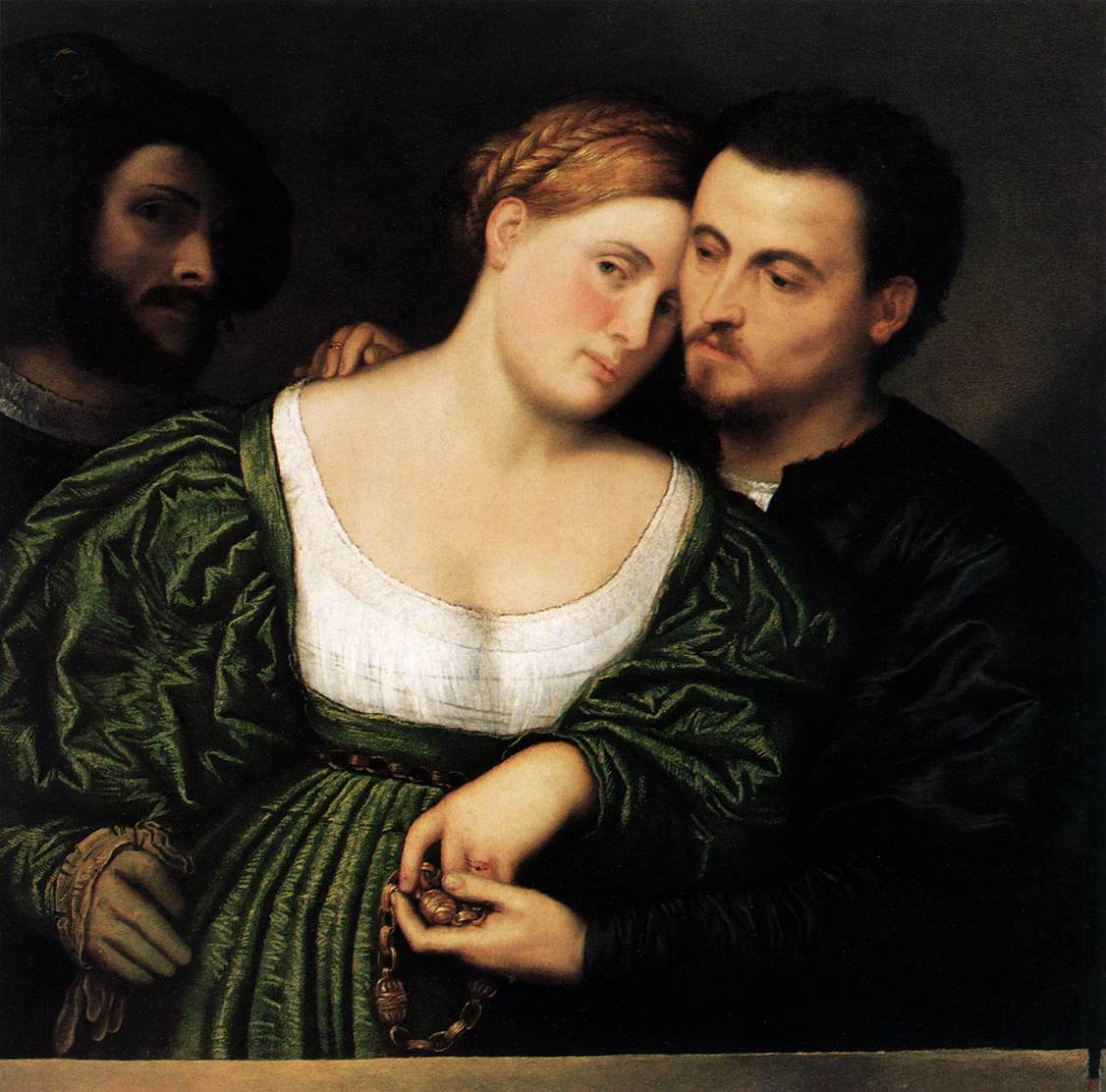
Venetian Lovers, between 1525 and 1530

Bordone was born in Treviso, but had moved to Venice by late adolescence. He apprenticed briefly and unhappily (according to Vasari) with Titian. Vasari may have met the elder Bordone.

Bordone's works of the 1520s include the Holy Family in Florence, Sacra Conversazione with Donor (Glasgow), and Holy Family with St. Catherine (Hermitage Museum). The St. Ambrose and a Donor (1523) is now in the Pinacoteca di Brera. In 1525–26, Bordone painted an altarpiece for the church of S. Agostino in Crema, a Madonna with St. Christopher and St George (now in the Palazzo Tadini collection at Lovere). A second altarpiece, Pentecost, is also in the Pinacoteca di Brera.

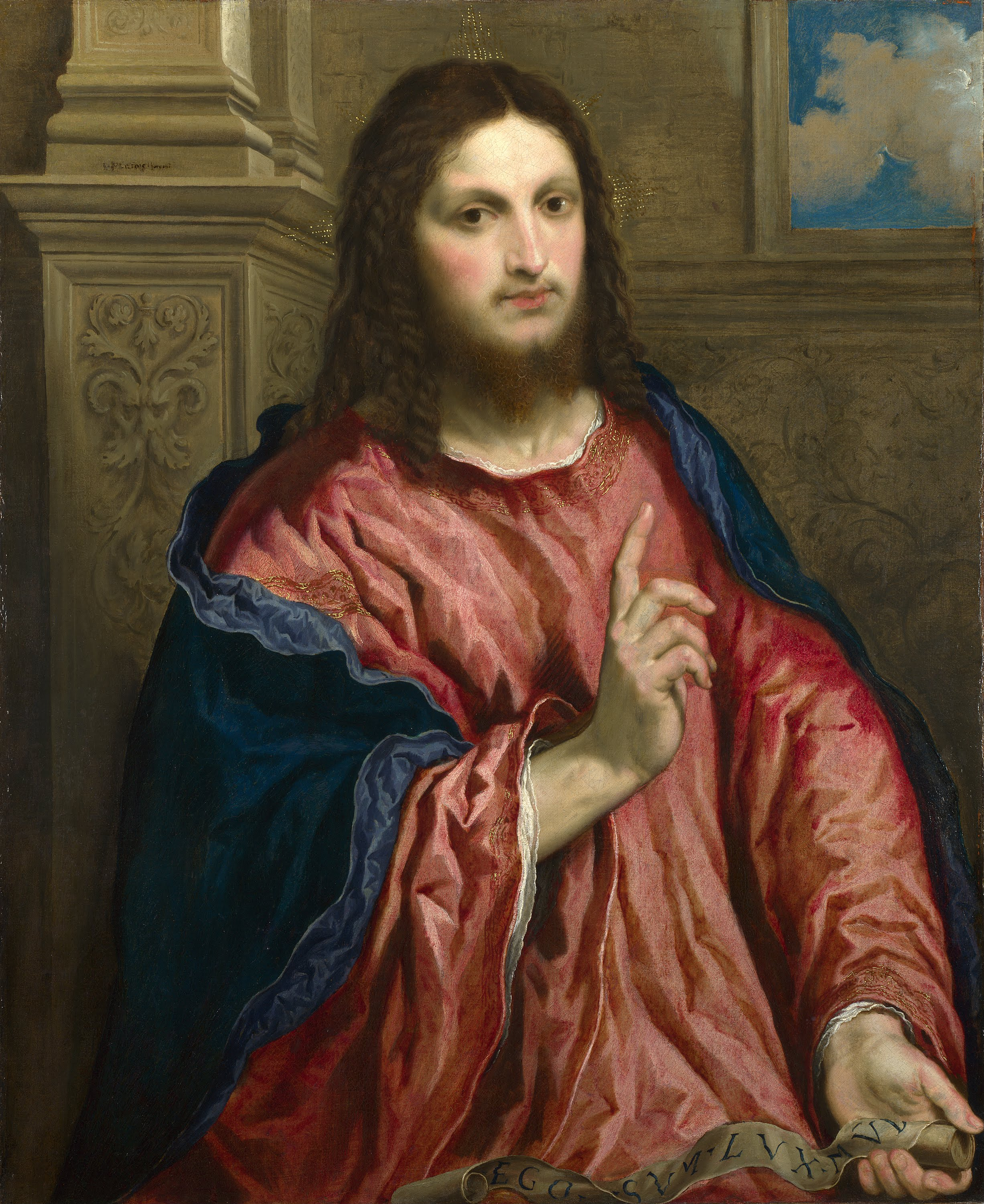
Christ as 'The Light of the World' , c. 1550. The National Gallery, London.

In 1534–35, he painted his large-scale masterpiece for the Scuola di San Marco a canvas of The Fisherman Presenting the Ring to Doge Gradenigo (Accademia). However, comparison between this latter painting and the near-contemporary, and structurally similar, Presentation of the Virgin reveals Bordone's limitations, his use of superior perspective which creates dwarfed distant perspectives, and limited coloration relative to the brilliant tints of Titian.

Bordone also painted smaller cabinet pieces, showing half-figures, semi-undressed men and women from mythology or religious stories in a muscular interaction despite the crowded space. He frequently combined portraiture with allegory.

Paris Bordone subsequently executed many important mural paintings in Venice, Treviso and Vicenza, all of which have perished. In 1538 he was invited to France by Francis I, at whose court he painted many portraits, though no trace of them is to be found in French collections, the two portraits at the Louvre being later acquisitions. On his return journey he also worked for the Fugger palace at Augsburg, but again the works have been lost.

== Partial list of works ==
- Annunciation - Musée des Beaux-Arts de Caen
- Baptism of Christ - National Gallery of Art, Washington, D.C.
- Bathsheba Bathing, with an African Servant - Walters Art Museum, Baltimore
- Chess Players - Gemäldegalerie, Berlin
- Daphnis and Chloe - Porczyński Gallery, Warsaw
- Holy Family - Bridgewater House, Westminster
- Madonna - Accademia di Belle Arti Tadini at Lovere
- Mythological picture - Galleria Borghese, Rome
- Mythological picture - Doria Pamphilj Gallery, Rome
- The paintings in Treviso Cathedral
- Rest on the Flight into Egypt - National Gallery of Victoria
- Portrait of a young woman - Thyssen-Bornemisza Museum, Madrid
- Perseus Armed by Mercury and Minerva - Birmingham Museum of Art
- A Portrait of a Lady - National Gallery, London
- Portrait of Giovanni Jacopo Caraglio - Wawel Castle, Kraków
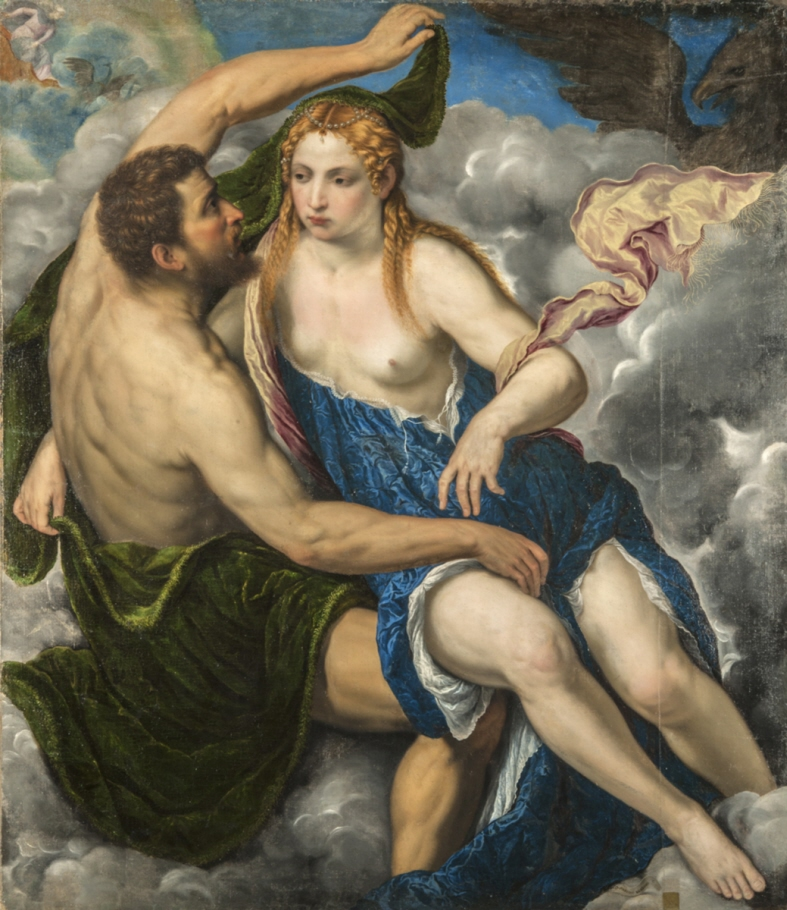
Jupiter and Io

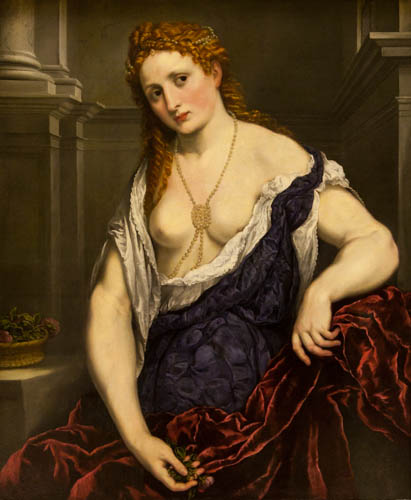
Flora

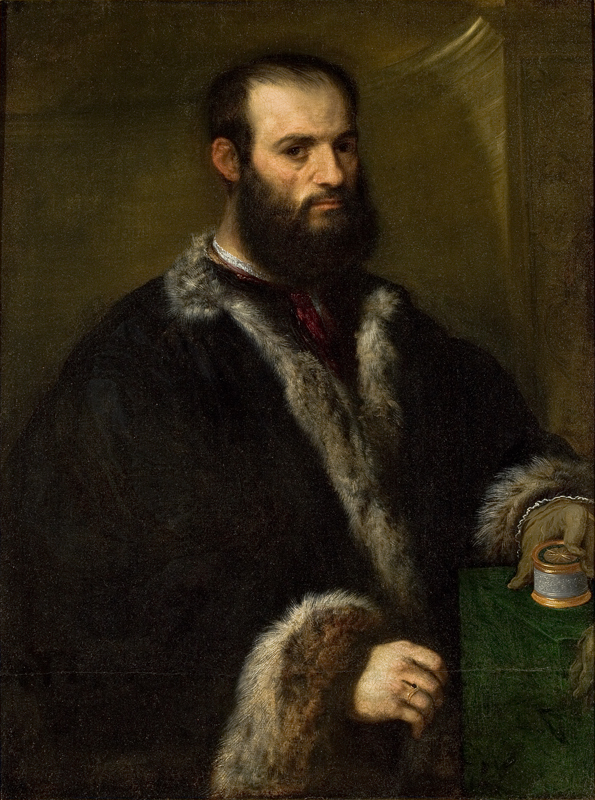
Alvise Contarini

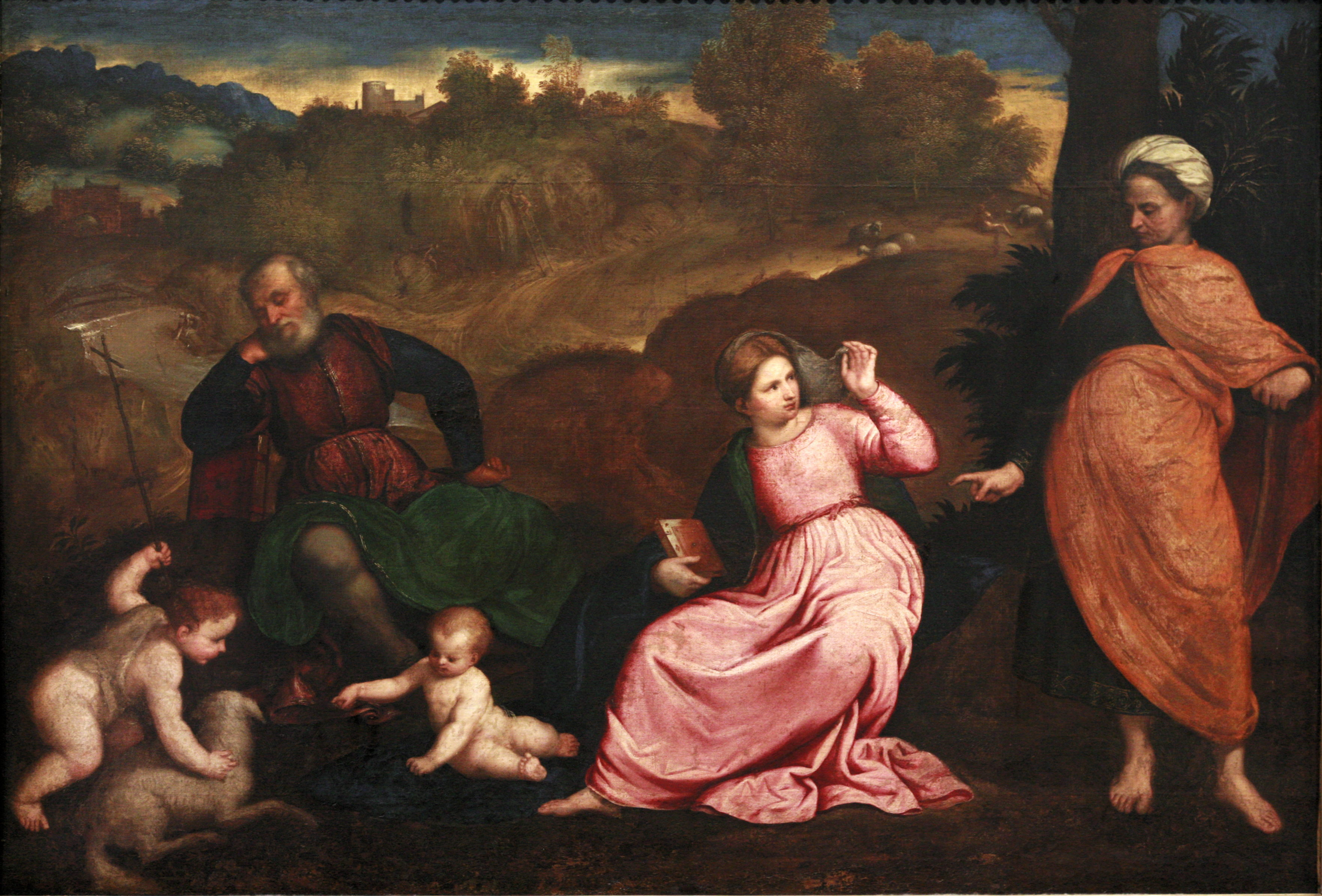
The Rest on the Flight into Egypt, c. 1530 (Musée des Beaux-Arts de Strasbourg)

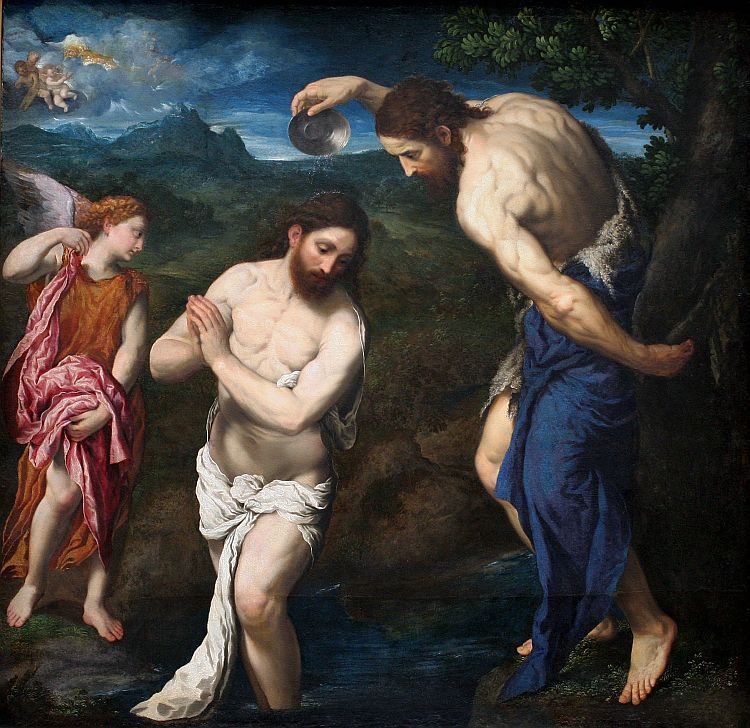
The Baptism of Christ, c. 1535–1540. National Gallery of Art, Washington, D.C.

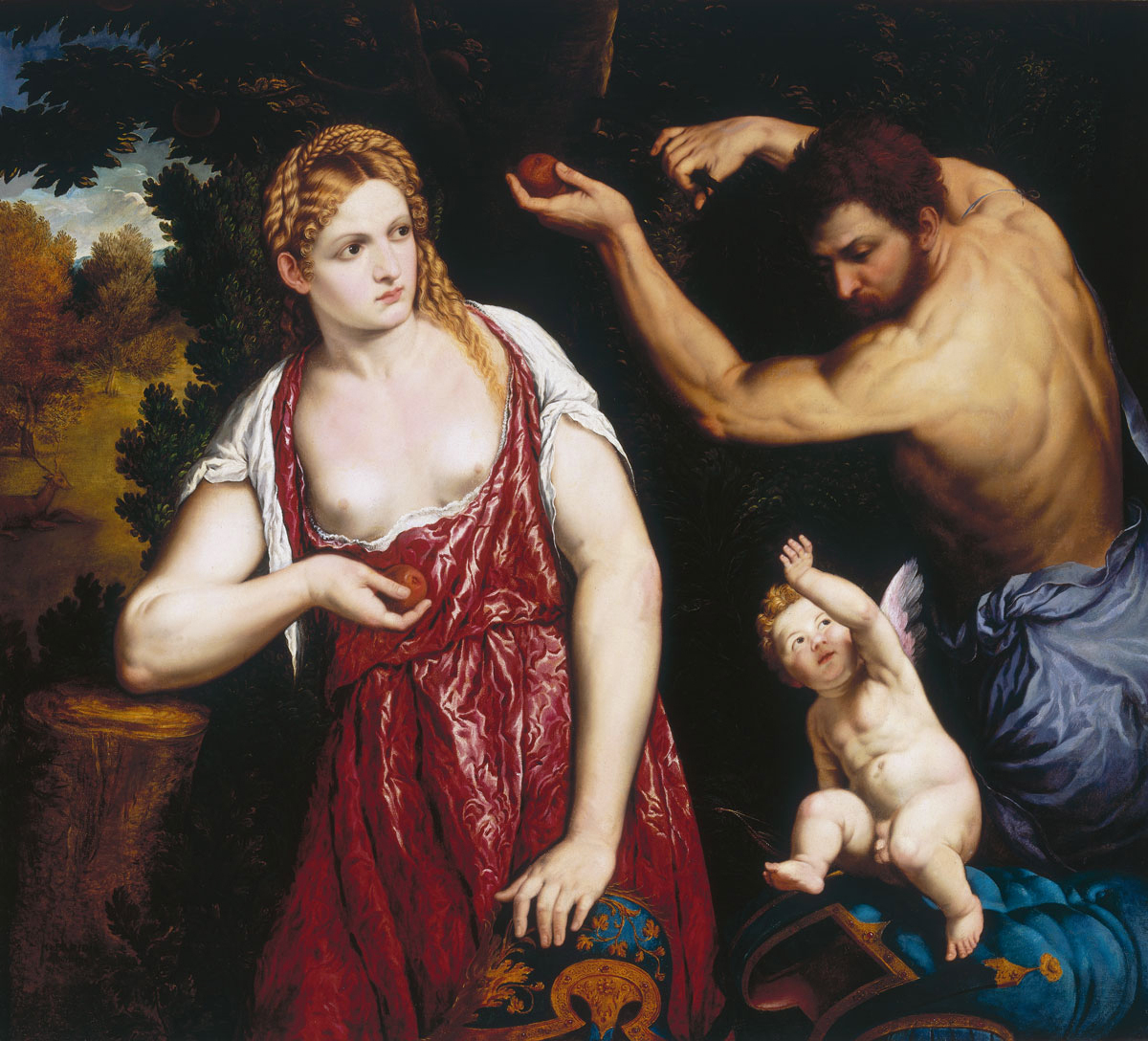
Venus and Mars with Cupid, 1559–1560. Doria Pamphilj Gallery

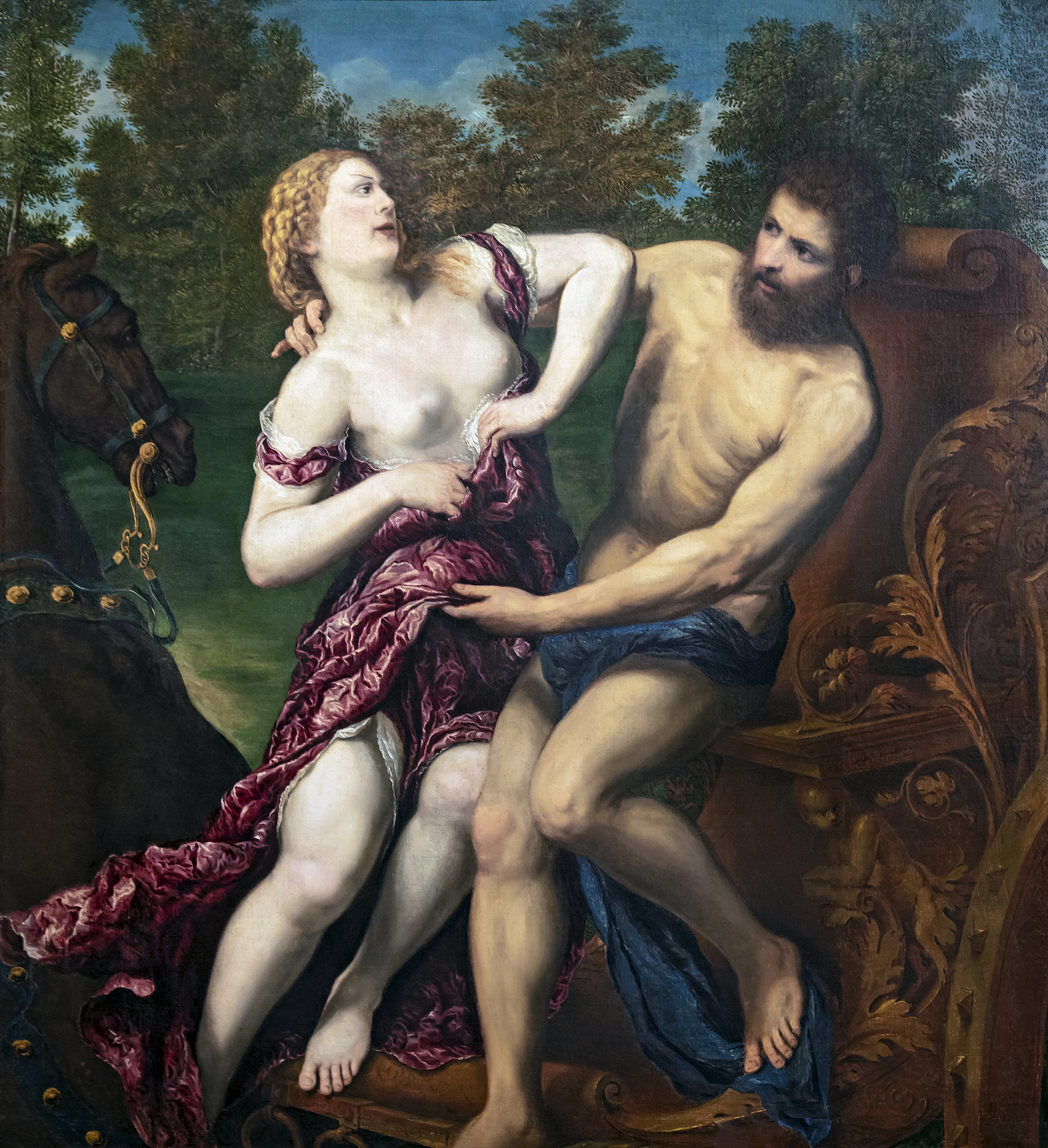
The Rape of Proserpina

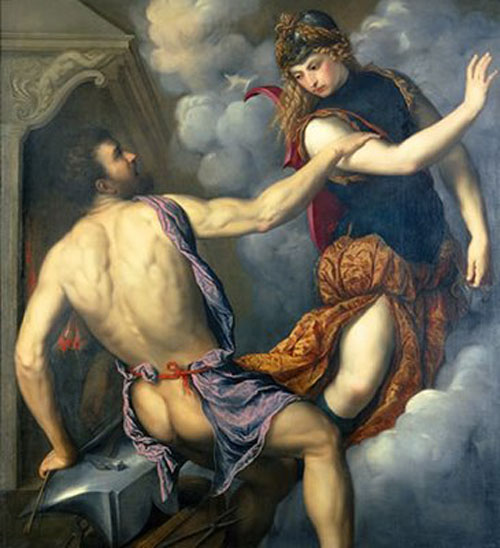
Athena Scorning the Advances of Hephaestus

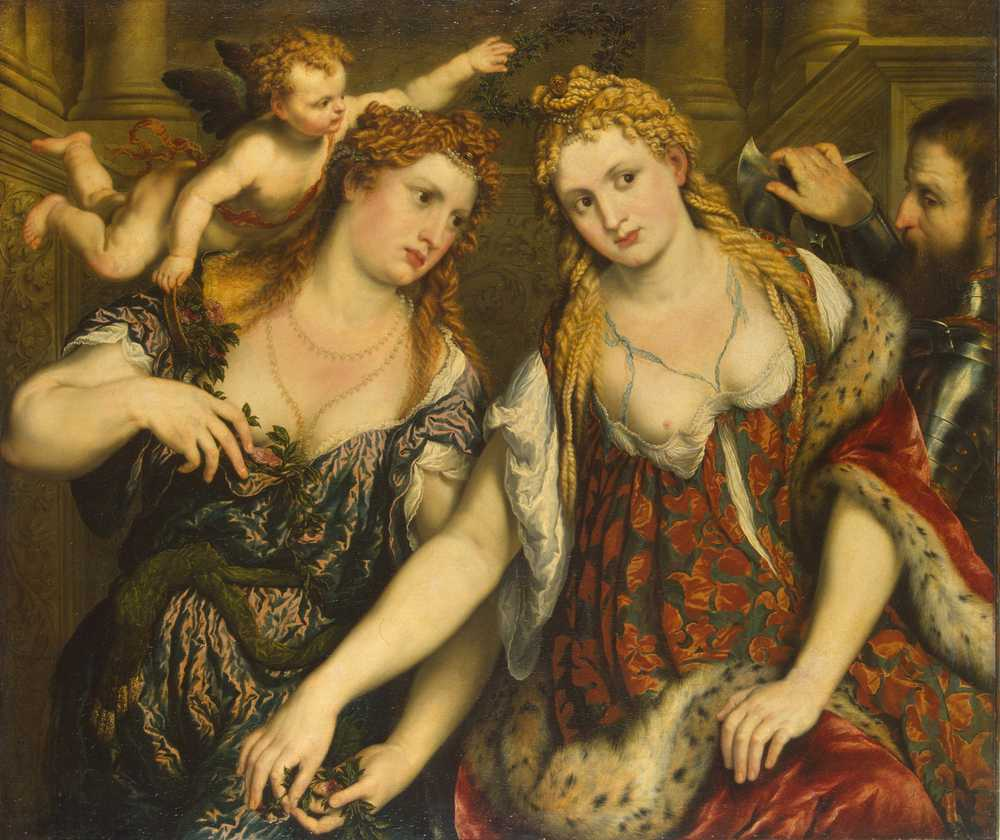
Venus, Flora, Mars and Cupid (An Allegory), 1550s. The Hermitage Museum.

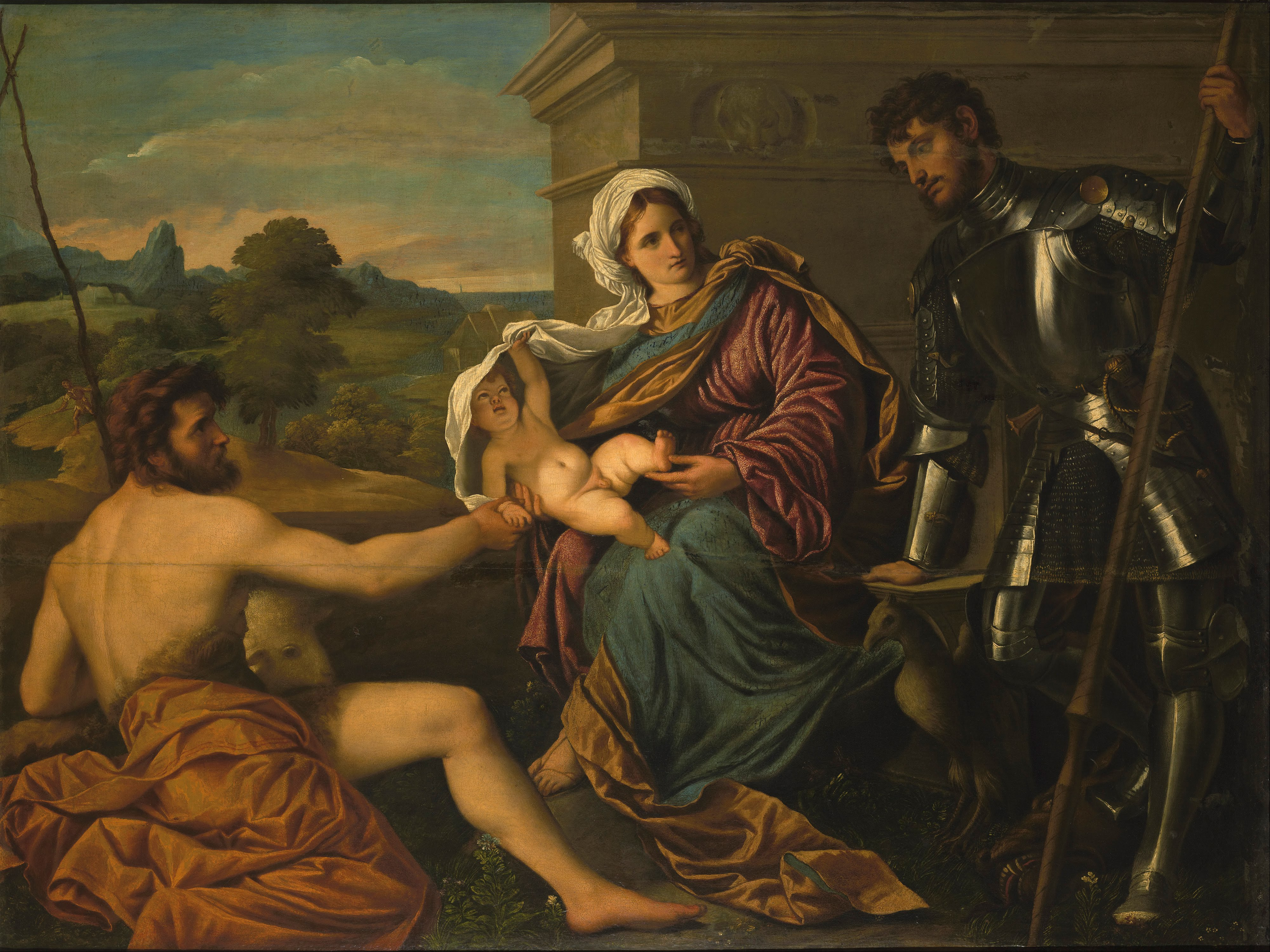
Madonna and Child with Saint John the Baptist and Saint George (Holy Conversation), early 1530s, Pushkin Museum, Moscow

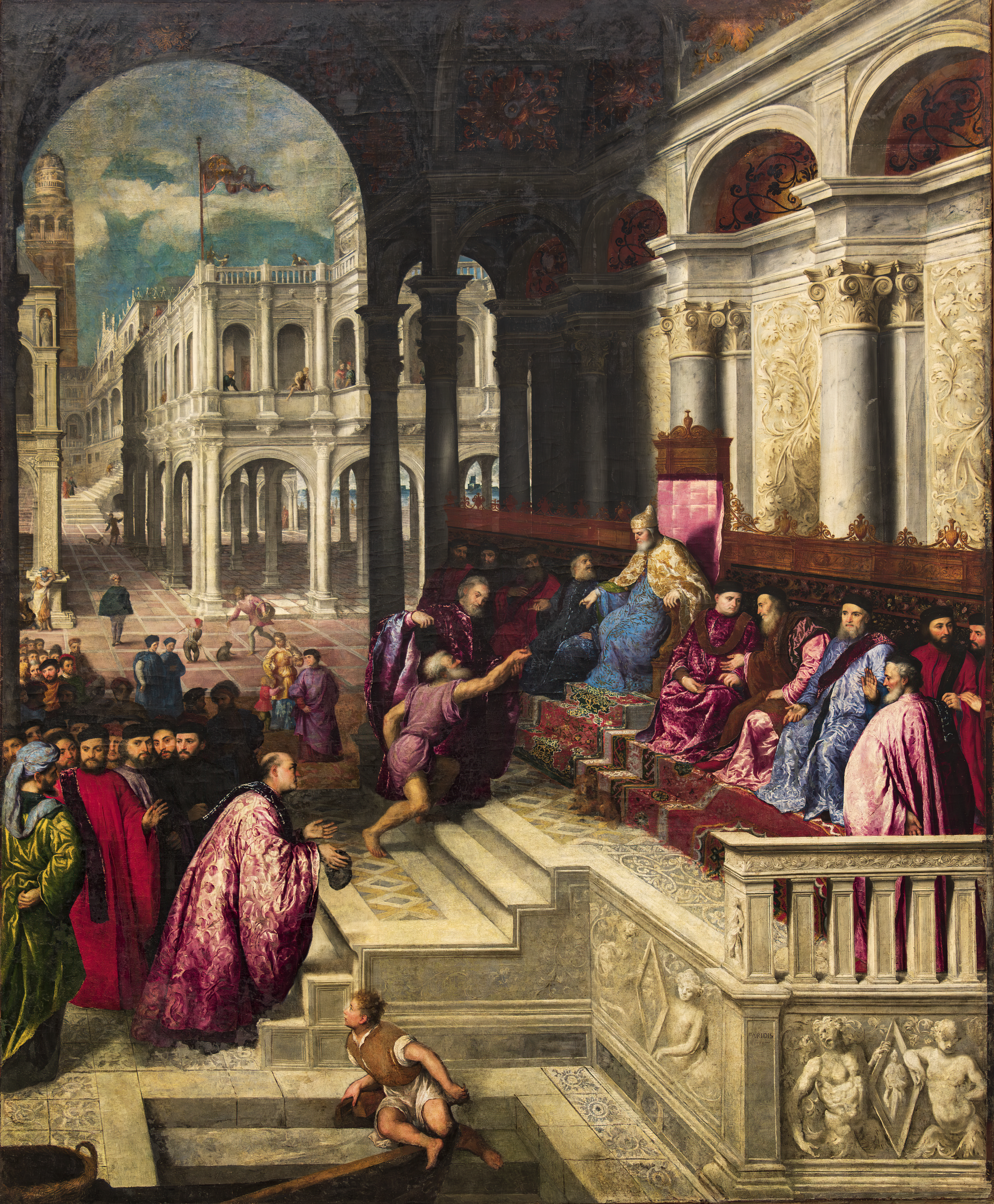
Presentation of the Ring to the Doge (Bartolomeo Gradenigo), 1534

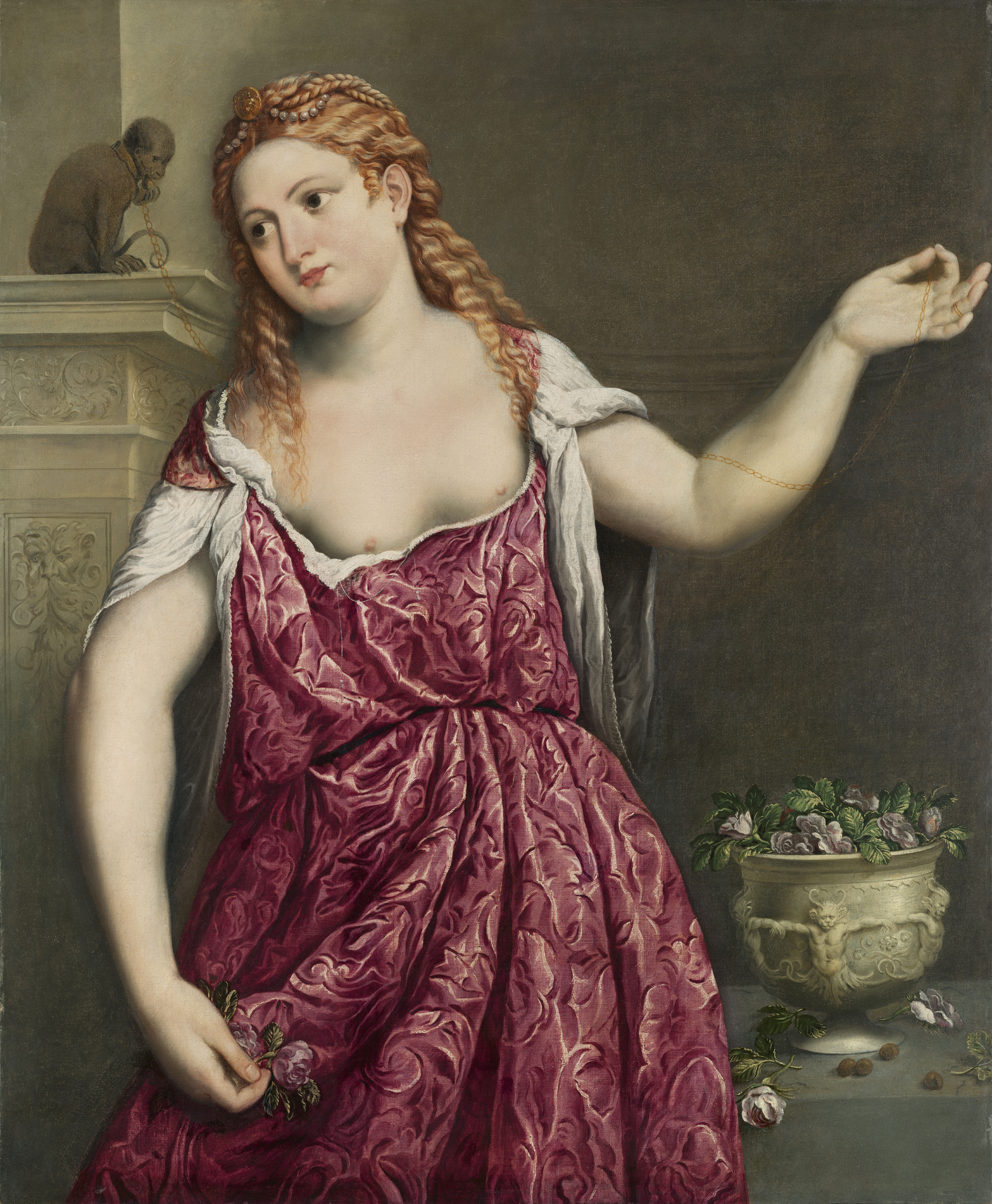
Portrait of a young woman, ca 1543-1550. Thyssen-Bornemisza Museum, Madrid.
