= Dragalevtsi =

Coordinates: 42°38′N 23°19′E

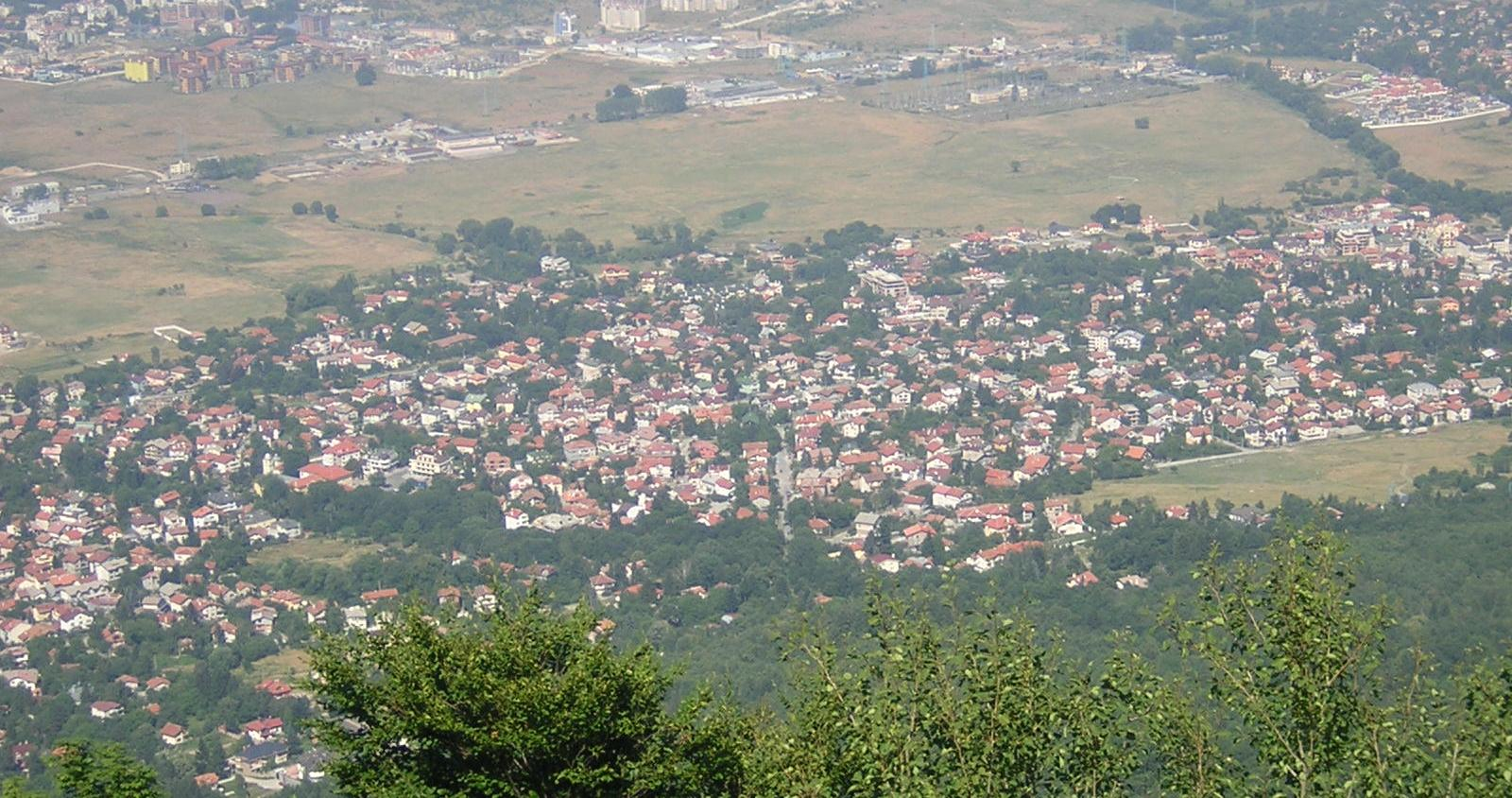
Dragalevtsi

Dragalevtsi (Bulgarian: Драгалевци [drɐɡɐˈlɛft͜si]) is a neighborhood of Sofia, which is located at the foot of Vitosha Mountain. It is part of the administrative district "Vitosha" of Sofia Municipality. Dragalevtsi is an affluent quarter built up with luxurious one-family country houses, villas, and hotels.

== Location ==
Its proximity to the city center (7 km) and Vitosha Mountain, the excellent panorama and communications makes it extremely attractive for living, preferred by the business elite and people with high social status. Originated centuries ago, over the years it has become an expensive villa area of the capital. "Dragalevtsi" is located at the foot of the mountain, between Simeonovo and Boyana near the Sofia Ring Road.

== History ==
Dragalevtsi, then a village, was first mentioned in a Bulgarian source in the Zograf Screed of 1527 as ДРАГАЛЄВ(Ц), with a reference to the monastery as МОНА ДРАГАЛЄВСКИ. It had been listed in Ottoman tax registers of 1420 as Diragulevça. Its name stems from the personal name Dragol or Dragal. Remains of a late antique church with fragments of relief decoration have been found in the neighborhood, which has not been studied in detail. The origin of the name Dragalevtsi is not completely clear. Another thing that the residents of Dragalevtsi considered necessary to do is to name their school after the Apostle, now in the center of Dragalevtsi rises the 50th school "Vasil Levski". Signs in the center of Dragalevtsi show the way the Apostle walked, in the footsteps of Vasil Levski passed many groups of students and other tourists who can testify that this path exists.

Until 1961 Dragalevtsi was a separate settlement. At the outbreak of the Balkan War in 1912, one person from the village was a volunteer in the Macedonian-Adrianopolitan Volunteer Corps.

== Architecture ==
The neighborhood is built primarily with normal country houses or in the lower part with luxury villas with spacious yards, single-family homes and small family hotels. The trends for construction in the area are aimed at the construction of complexes of houses with controlled access. There are already built in the area, and others are still under construction. Property prices in the Dragalevtsi district maintain some of the highest levels in the capital. Vacant land is declining, despite the lack of sewerage infrastructure.

== More details ==
There is one public school in the neighborhood, 50 "Vasil Levski" primary school at 1 Bella Donna Street, and one private school with English language studies "St. George". The health service is located at 5 - 7 Han Krum Street, there are also many private kindergartens. The neighborhood has a town hall and post office. The proximity to Vitosha Mountain and one of the most popular monasteries in the area - Dragalevtsi Monastery, make the place preferred for a walk on the weekends. There are many good restaurants and several hotels in the area. Nearby is the monastery "St. Bogoroditsa", built in the 13th century. A two-seater cable car has been built in the Dragalevtsi neighborhood, which connects the neighborhood with the ski slopes of Vitosha.
