= Andrea Dandolo =

Doge of Venice from 1343 to 1354

His Serenity Andrea Dandolo
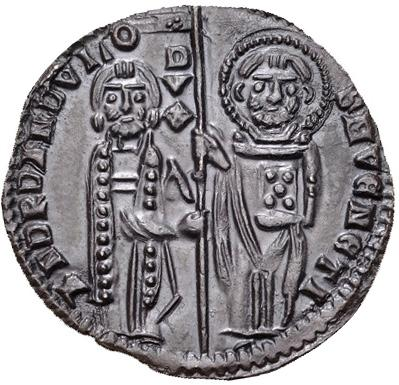
- Grosso of Andrea Dandolo

54th Doge of Venice
- In office 1343 – 7 September 1354
- Preceded by: Bartolomeo Gradenigo
- Succeeded by: Marino Faliero

Personal details
- Born: 1306
- Died: 7 September 1354 (aged 47–48) Republic of Venice
- Resting place: St Mark's Basilica
- Education: University of Padua

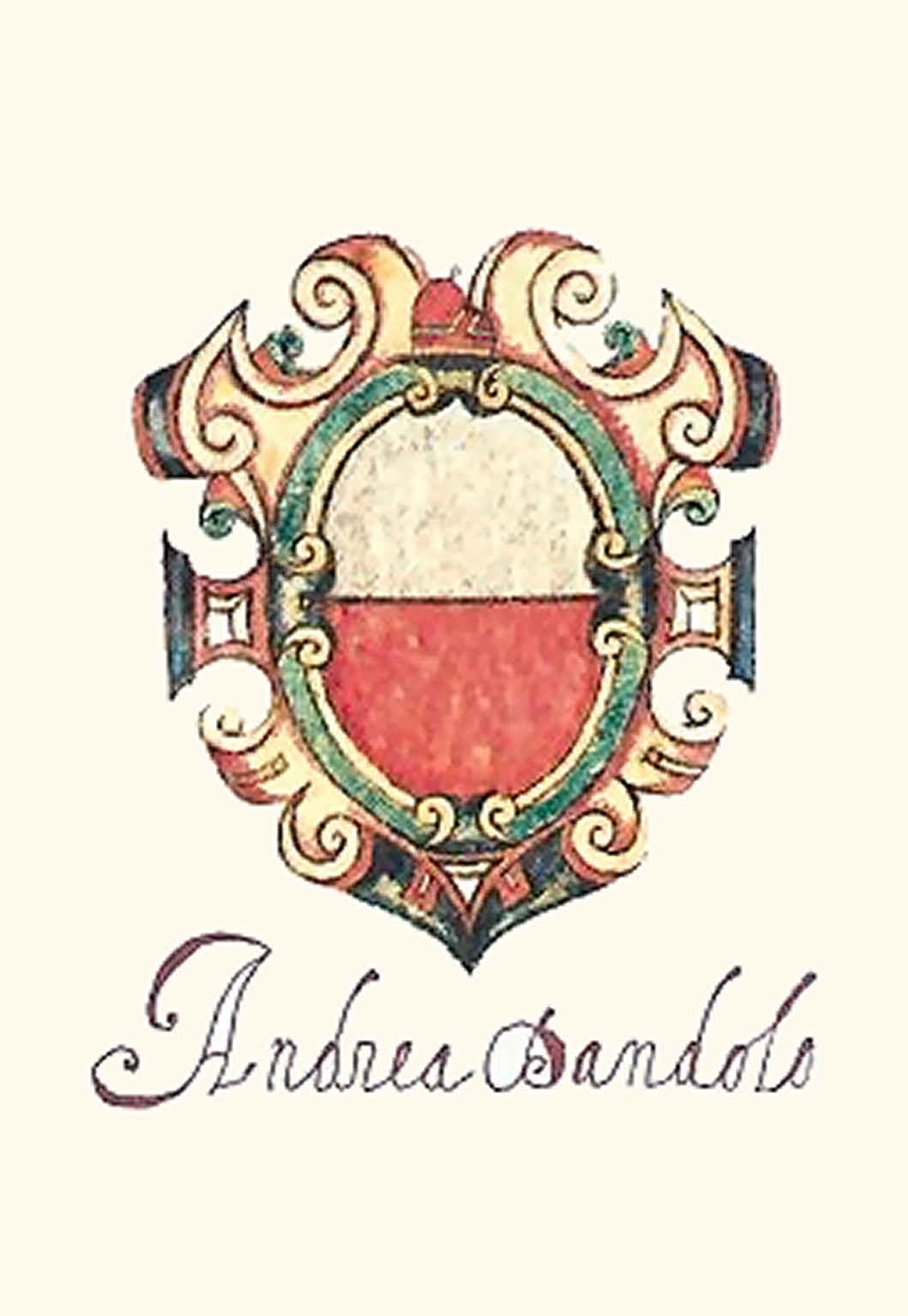
Andrea Dandolo's coat of arms.

Andrea Dandolo (1306 – 7 September 1354) was the 54th doge of Venice from 1343 to 1354. He was elected to replace Bartolomeo Gradenigo who died in 1342.

== Early life ==
Trained in historiography and law, Dandolo studied at the University of Padua, where he became a law professor until he was elected as doge. He was descended from an old Venetian noble family, the Dandolo, that played an important role in Venetian politics from the 12th to 15th centuries, and produced four Venetian doges, of whom he was the last, numerous admirals and several other prominent citizens.

Dandolo's rise to prominence in Venetian public life was precocious. In 1331, at the age of only 25, he was named procurator of St Mark's Basilica.

== Doge ==
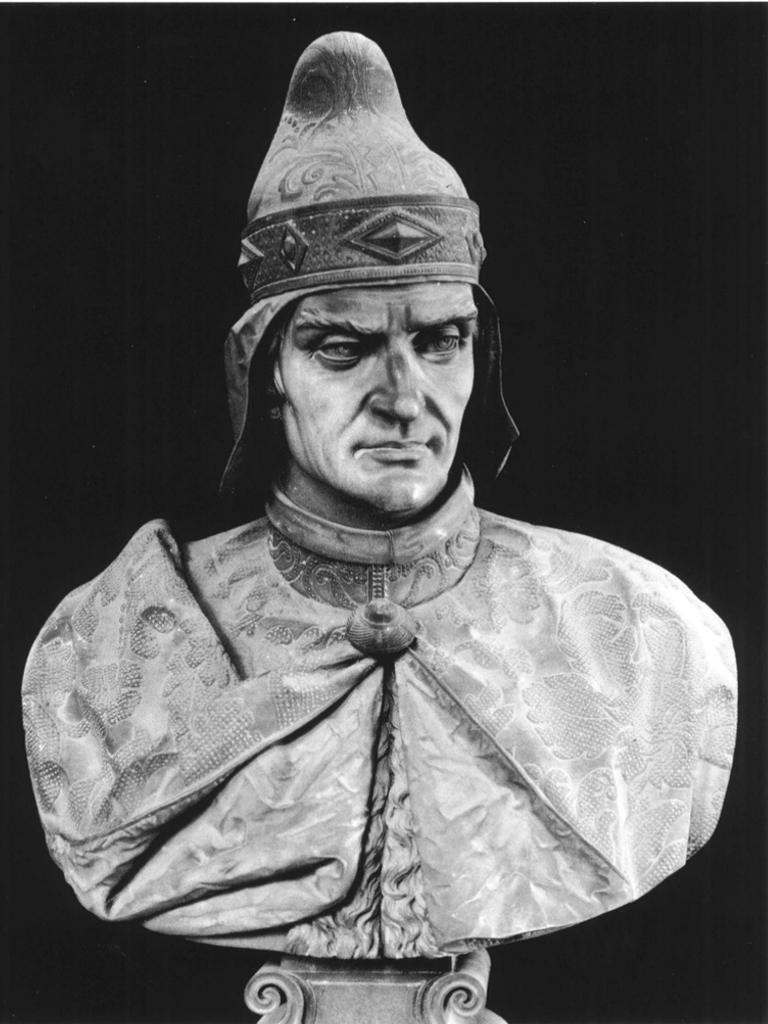
Andrea Dandolo, by Lorenzo Moretti Larese, 1861. The bust is in the Panteon Veneto, in the Palazzo Loredan

Dandolo became doge in 1343 at the age of 37. He was known as a benefactor of the arts. To St Mark's Basilica he added the Chapel of San Isidoro, oversaw changes to the Pala d'Oro and expanded and beautified the Baptistery.

He reformed the Venetian legal code, formally proclaiming a legal framework in 1346 that compiled all of the applicable laws in the Republic. He was a friend of Petrarch's, who wrote of Dandolo that he was "a just man, incorruptible, full of ardor and love for his country, erudite, eloquent, wise, affable and humane".

His reign was beset by challenges as Venice was struck by a violent earthquake on 25 January 1348 that caused hundreds of casualties, destroyed numerous buildings and, it was assumed at the time, provoked the terrible outbreak of the Black Death, which did not end until 1350. Between 1348 and 1350, one-third of the population died.

Also Venice endured a disastrous war with the Hungarians following Zadar's seventh revolt against the Most Serene Republic in 1345. Allied with the Hungarians, Genoa deployed a powerful naval fleet to the Adriatic under the command of Paganino Doria that devastated the Venetian territories and threatened Venice herself. Venice was saved by the great naval victory of Lojera in 1353.

Dandolo was the last doge to be interred in St Mark's Basilica.

== Writings ==
Dandolo wrote two chronicles in Latin on the history of Venice, the Chronica per extensum descripta aa. [ad annum] 46–1280 d.C. [dopo Cristo], written between 1344 and 1351/52, and the Chronica brevis aa. 46–1342 d.C., written before 1342, which can both be found in volume XII of Muratori’s collection Rerum Italicarum Scriptores. (Note: Originally published in Milan in 1728, a new edition, edited by Ester Pastorello, was published in Bologna in 1938.)

== Bibliography ==
- Madden, Thomas F. (2012). Venice : A New History (Hardback). New York: Viking. ISBN 978-0-670-02542-8.

Political offices
Preceded by Bartolomeo Gradenigo	Doge of Venice; 1343–1354	Succeeded by Marino Faliero
