= List of LGBTQ-related films of 1975 =

This is a list of lesbian, gay, bisexual, transgender or queer-related films released in 1975. It contains theatrically released films that deal with important gay, lesbian, bisexual, transgender or queer characters or issues and may have same-sex romance or relationships as a plot device.

== Films ==
Title	Director	Country	Genre	Cast	Notes
Anna und Edith	Gerrit Neuhaus	West Germany	Drama	Barbara Stanek,Karin Siefart, Henning Gissel, Randolf Kronberg, Eva Manhardt, Ingrid Hoffmann, Tosca Dohnke, Hilde Hessmann and Wieslawa Wesolowska	
Cleopatra Jones and the Casino of Gold	Charles Bail	United States	Adventure, Crime	Tamara Dobson, Stella Stevens	
Deep Red	Dario Argento	Italy	Horror	David Hemmings, Daria Nicolodi, Macha Méril, Clara Calamai, Gabriele Lavia, Eros Pagni, Giuliana Calandra, Piero Mazzinghi, Glauco Mauri, Aldo Bonamano, Liana Del Balzo, Vittorio Fanfoni, Dante Fioretti, Geraldine Hooper, Jacopo Mariani (as Iacopo Mariani), Nicoletta Elmi, Furio Meniconi, Fulvio Mingozzi, Lorenzo Piani and Attilio Dottesio	
Dog Day Afternoon	Sidney Lumet	United States	Crime, drama	Al Pacino, John Cazale, Charles Durning, James Broderick, Lance Henriksen, Chris Sarandon, Penelope Allen, Sully Boyar, Susan Peretz, Carol Kane, Beulah Garrick, Sandra Kazan, Estelle Omens, Marcia Jean Kurtz, Amy Levitt, Gary Springer, John Marriott and Philip Charles MacKenzie	
Fox and His Friends	Rainer Werner Fassbinder	West Germany	Crime, drama	Rainer Werner Fassbinder, Peter Chatel, Karlheinz Böhm, Harry Baer, Adrian Hoven, Ulla Jacobsson, Christiane Maybach and Karl Scheydt	
In Celebration	Lindsay Anderson	United Kingdom	Drama	Alan Bates, Bill Owen, Brian Cox	
Jacques Brel Is Alive and Well and Living in Paris	Denis Héroux	France; Canada; United States	Musical	Mort Shuman, Elly Stone, Joe Masiell	Adapted from the Off-Broadway revue of the same name
Köçek	Nejat Saydam	Turkey	Drama	Müjde Ar, Mahmut Hekimoğlu, Nisa Serezli, İlhan Daner, Nevin Güler, Senar Seven, Yılmaz Gruda, Asuman Arsan, Yüksel Gözen, Handan Adalı and Nevin Nuray	
Mahogany	Berry Gordy	United States	Romance, drama	Diana Ross, Billy Dee Williams, Jean-Pierre Aumont	
Once Is Not Enough	Guy Green	United States	Drama	Kirk Douglas, Alexis Smith, David Janssen, George Hamilton, Melina Mercouri, Gary Conway, Brenda Vaccaro, Deborah Raffin, Lillian Randolph, Renata Vanni, Mark Roberts, John Roper and Leonard Sachs	
The Rocky Horror Picture Show	Jim Sharman	United Kingdom; United States	Comedy, horror, musical, science fiction	Tim Curry, Susan Sarandon, Barry Bostwick, Richard O'Brien, Patricia Quinn, Nell Campbell (credited as Little Nell), Jonathan Adams, Peter Hinwood, Meat Loaf, Charles Gray, Jeremy Newson and Hilary Farr	
Salò, or the 120 Days of Sodom	Pier Paolo Pasolini	Italy; France	Drama, horror, war	Paolo Bonacelli, Giorgio Cataldi, Umberto Paolo Quintavalle, Aldo Valletti, Caterina Boratto, Elsa De Giorgi, Hélène Surgère, Sonia Saviange, Rinaldo Missaglia, Giuseppe Patruno, Guido Galletti, Efisio Etzi, Claudio Troccoli, Fabrizio Menichini, Maurizio Valaguzza, Ezio Manni, Inès Pellegrini, Sergio Fascetti, Bruno Musso, Antonio Orlando, Claudio Cicchetti, Franco Merli, Umberto Chessari, Lamberto Book, Gaspare di Jenno, Giuliana Melis, Faridah Malik, Graziella Anicet, Renata Moar, Benedetta Gaetani, Olga Andreis, Dorit Henke, Antiniska Nemour, Tatiana Mogilansky, Susanna Radaelli, Giuliana Orlandi and Liana Acquaviva	
Saturday Night at the Baths	David Buckley	United States	Comedy, drama	Robert Aberdeen, Ellen Sheppard, Don Scotti, Steve Ostrow, Phillip Owens, Jane Olivor (as Janie Olivor), R. Douglas Brautingham, Paul Ott (as Paul J. Ott), Paul Vanase, Caleb Stonn, J.C. Gaynor, Pedro Valentine, Toyia, Josh Palace and Keith Kermizian	Set in Continental Baths in New York City
