= Hekimoğlu Türküsü =

Song
- Language: Turkish
- English title: The Ballad of Hekimoğlu
- Written: 1966 (TRT version)
- Released: 17 March 1973
- Recorded: 26 May 1971 (according to TRT Türkü Repertoire)
- Genre: Turkish folk music
- Songwriters: Kadir İnanır (TRT version); Töreli Hafız (uncensored version, as a lament); Anonymous (first version)
- Composers: Ümit Tokcan (TRT version); Hamdi Tanses (uncensored version)

Hekimoğlu (English: The Ballad of Hekimoğlu) is a popular Turkish türkü (folk song) in the musical modal Chahargah with a rhythm of 4/4. Although the TRT archive lists Ümit Tokcan as the source under the repertoire number 110, Ümit Tokcan himself says that the folk song was actually compiled by Kadir İnanır. The region of the folk song is Fatsa, Ordu. It was first written as a lament by Kalyoncuoğlu Recep, who is also known as Töreli Hafız. The türkü was repopularised in the 2000s by popular Turkish media franchise Valley of the Wolves, playing a crucial role in the series, it was covered by Oktay Kaynarca who played as the character "Süleyman Çakır" in the franchise.

In the footnote section of the 63rd page of the book titled "Ünye Songs and Folk Songs 3" published in September 2010; composer of the uncensored version of Hekimoğlu, Hamdi Tanses claims that the lament of Hekimoğlu, was burnt by his grandfather Kalyoncuoğlu Recep (Töreli Hafız), and that the words used in the lament are common in the folk language from the Çitlice village, located in Korgan.

The türkü deals with a hero fighting against his fate, young lovers separated from each other, and death. The lyrics are composed from the perspective of the main character in the song. Hekimoğlu addresses his beloved as “Narinim” in the song. The song begins with descriptive words and ends with words of sorrow and reproach.

== Story of the türkü ==
Hekimoğlu İbrahim, who was born in the village of Yassıtaş, about 40 kilometers from Fatsa, fell in love with a beautiful girl whom everyone called “Narin”; however, the girl was engaged to a Georgian lord who ruled the region. When the lord learned of their relationship, he invited Hekimoğlu to his house. During the meeting, Hekimoğlu killed the lord's nephew, who had reached for the lord's weapon, thus causing bloodshed between the Georgians and the villagers of Yassıtaş.

After the incident, Hekimoğlu sent his mother away from the village and settled her with a relative in Bolu. He took his nephews with him and went to the mountains, spending the rest of his life as a bandit and becoming a folk hero in the imagination of the people, someone who took refuge from injustice. The Georgian lord constantly reported him to the gendarmerie, but Hekimoğlu escaped many times thanks to his special rifle (“aynalı martin”) equipped with a mirror. Hekimoğlu survives many battles, but eventually falls into an ambush set by Dadyan Arslan, who has been pursuing him, and is wounded and killed.

== Song ==
The anonymous türkü emerged in the early years of the 20th century with the title "Hekimoğlu Derler Benim Aslıma". Like many folk songs of the time, several versions exist. The most common version of the türkü is:

Hekimoğlu derler benim aslıma Aynalı martin yaptırdım da narinim kendi neslime Hekimoğlu derler bir küçük uşak, Bir omuzdan bir omuza narinim on arma fişek Konaklar yaptırdım mermer direkli, Hekimoğlu dediğin de narinim aslan yürekli Konaklar yaptırdım döşetemedim, Ünye Fatsa bir oldu da narinim baş edemedim Ünye, Fatsa arası Ordu'da kuruldu, Hekimoğlu dediğin narinim o da vuruldu	I'm called Hekimoğlu, (lit., the doctor's son) I had a Martini-Henry rifle with mirror made for myself, my narin The one called Hekimoğlu is a small kid, One shoulder to one shoulder narin, bandolier with ten bullets I had mansions with pillars of marble built, He whom you called Hekimoğlu, is lion-hearted I had mansions built but I couldn't make them furnished, Ünye and Fatsa joined their forces, my narin, I couldn't cope with them Between Fatsa and Ünye, Ordu was established, He whom you called Hekimoğlu was shot too

In the first couplet, the word martin refers to a Peabody-Martini-Henry rifle. It is also debated that the word "ordu" used in the last couplet is used in the meaning of meaning of military (Turkish: ordu). It is claimed by former member of the Grand National Assembly Mustafa Hasan Öz that the phrase in which Öz's grandfather's name was mentioned ("I couldn't cope with Dadyan Arslan") was replaced by "Ünye and Fatsa joined their forces, my narin, I couldn't cope with them" in case of a reaction from the public.

=== Censorship ===
There is a distinct difference between the folk lyrics of the folk song and the lyrics included in the TRT archive. Hekimoğlu in the language of the people is the depiction of a virtuous rebel who opposes oppression, injustice and bastardy. While the Hekimoğlu, who was included in Mehmet Özbek's book "Folklore ve Türkülerimiz" and transferred to the TRT archive, is abstracted from all those virtues and turned into a person who has a softer personality. The acute accents in the lyrics of the folk song were replaced by docile and orderly words.

For example, the following parts of the folk song were censored:

İster vali gelsin isterse paşa, Gelme paşa gelme ben atmam boşa Çitlice'nin muhtarı puşttur pezevenk, Hekimoğlu geliyor uçkur çözerek	Whether the governor comes or the pasha, no matter Don't come over me, I shall not miss. The headman of Çitlice is an arsehole, pimp Hekimoğlu is coming by having sex

In some regions of Ordu, the words “Hekimoğlu is coming by having sex” are sung as “Hekimoğlu is coming by crushing the enemy”. The reason why the headman of Çitlice is called an arsehole in the song is due to Hekimoğlu's visit to the headman's house in Çitlice village following the murder of his Hekimoğlu's two nephews. According to author, Kurdologist and Turkologist Mehmet Bayrak, although the headman seems to be on Hekimoğlu's side, in reality he is in collaboration with the Turkish gendarme. As a matter of fact, he gives a tip-off through one of his men and Hekimoğlu gets cornered by the gendarmes because of the headman's trick. A big clash breaks out and Hekimoğlu, according to a rumour, breaks through the circle, but dies of his wounds before he can get far. The couplets themself also vary depending on the variation, with them being changed to:

Bugün günlerden pazardır, pazar Çiftlice muhtarı dediğin de narimin, puştluklar düzer	Today is Sunday, Sunday Whom you call Çiftlice headman, narimin fucks over people

== Compilation ==
The folk song was first compiled in Fatsa by Şükrü Şenses during compilation work carried out by the Ankara State Conservatory under the direction of Muzaffer Sarısözen. It was published in Ahmet Caferoğlu's 1946 book Kuzeydoğu İllerimiz Ağızlarından Derlemeler (Compilations from the Dialects of Our Northeastern Provinces). This text, which consists of three-line stanzas and a two-line refrain, is of the koşma type, and its melody is unknown.

Zeki Sarıhan, who taught in the village of Yassıtaş in Fatsa between 1965 and 1967, researched the story of the folk song in the summer of 1968; according to the TRT Repertory book, Ümit Tokcan collected and transcribed the folk song in 1973. The book states that the source person is Kadir İnanır. It is thought that the song was performed by actor Kadir İnanır in a film and that Ümit Tokcan collected it from Kadir İnanır and wrote the notation. The name “Kadir İnanır” is also written on the record “Hekimoğlu” (1974) released by Ümit Tokcan.

According to an article by Dadyan Arslan Çığtay in a local Fatsa newspaper in 2024, Dadyan Arslan, who led the Georgians in the region, banned discussions of the subject and singing of the folk song after Hekimoğlu's death, and thus the Hekimoğlu folk song was not sung for years on the grounds that it “fueled hostilities.” Years later, Ümit Tokcan, at the suggestion of Kadir İnanır, wanted to record this song on his cassette and obtained permission from Dadyan Arslan's son to sing it on the cassette. In the same article, it is stated that the phrase “I couldn't deal with Dadyan Arslan” in the folk song was removed at the request of Dadyan Arslan's son and the line “Ünye Fatsa became one, I couldn't deal with it” was added.

A less common variant of the folk song was collected by Hamdi Tanses from the village of Çitlice in the district of Korgan. Hamdi Tanses stated that Hekimoğlu died in Erzurum in 1917 and that the lament was composed by his grandfather Kalyoncuoğlu Recep, also known as Töreli Hafız.

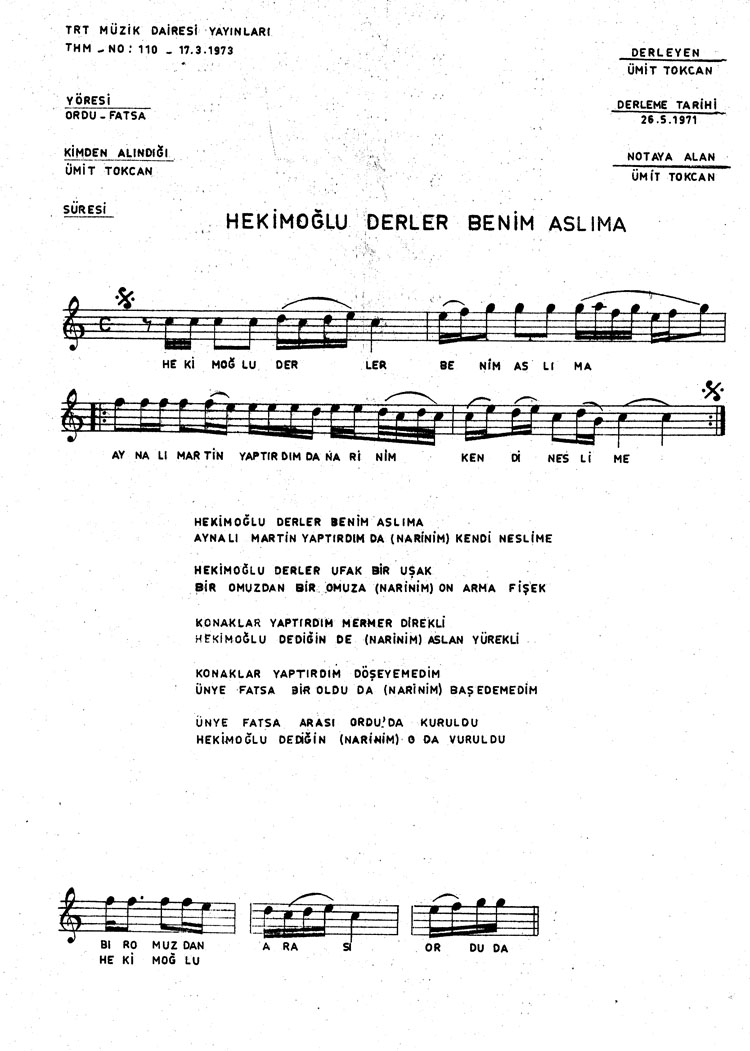
Sheets of the türkü

== Variations ==
The türkü has been covered by many singers and bands such as:

- Resul Dindar
- Ayna
- Gökhan Kırdar
- Özdemir Erdoğan
- Oktay Kaynarca
- Mazhar ve Fuat
- Fuat Saka
- Tülay German (uncensored version)
- Grup Çığ
- Soner Olgun

=== Variations outside of Anatolia ===
Μανώλης Λιδάκης (Manolis Lidakis) sang the türkü in Greek as Στου μυαλού μου τ'άγρια βάθη (In The Wild Depths Of My Mind).

== In popular culture ==
The libretto of the opera Hekimoğlu, written by Bertan Rona and composed by Tolga Taviş, was based on the folk song Hekimoğlu. In the 1222nd measure of the work, Narin sings “Hekimoğlu Türküsü” accompanied by an alto flute, and the work ends with the participation of the choir and orchestra.

The Turkish television series Hekimoğlu, released in the 2003-2004 season, was created by enriching the story of the folk song with the screenwriters' additions.

== See also ==
- Hekimoğlu
