= Hekimoğlu (disambiguation) =

Hekimoğlu (died 1913), born Hekimoğlu İbrahim, was an Ottoman Turkish outlaw and folk hero.

== People ==
- Hekimoğlu Ali Pasha (1689–1758), Ottoman grand vizier and statesman
- Bahattin Hekimoğlu (born 1989), Turkish para archer
- Mahmut Hekimoğlu (1955–2016), Turkish actor and film producer

== Arts and entertainment ==
- Hekimoğlu (TV series), a Turkish television medical drama
