= Mine Biret Tavman Ertuğrul =

Turkish textile artist and professor

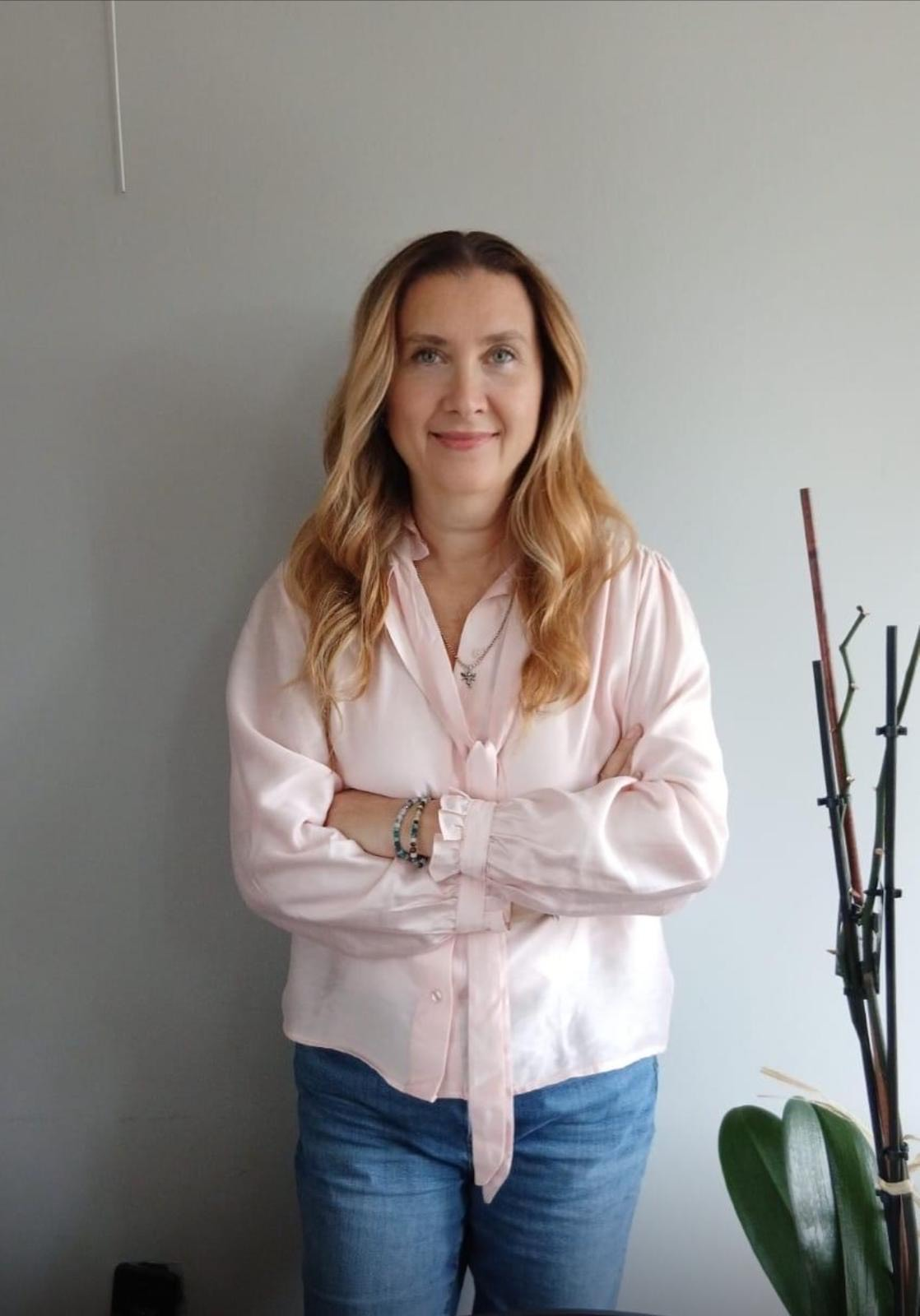
- Tavman Ertuğrul in 2025
- Occupations: Textile artist and academic
- Employer: Marmara University

Mine Biret Tavman Ertuğrul is a Turkish textile artist and academic specializing in knitting art and knitting design education. She is a professor in the Textile Department at Marmara University's Faculty of Fine Arts, where she has served as head of department.

== Early life and education ==
Tavman Ertuğrul was born in Ordu, Turkey. She completed her undergraduate studies at Marmara University, Faculty of Fine Arts (Textile). She later studied in the United Kingdom, completing postgraduate work in textiles at the University of Leeds and doctoral studies at the University of Manchester Institute of Science and Technology (UMIST).

== Academic career ==
Tavman Ertuğrul has worked at Marmara University in the Textile Department and has held academic leadership roles including department head. Her academic work includes publications on knitting art and design, including research on transferring knitting art into digital environments.

== Artistic work and initiatives ==
Her practice and teaching focus on knitting as a contemporary textile art form, and she has been associated with efforts to expand contemporary knitting and fiber art in Turkey.

In 2011, she founded the Face & Reverse knitting group, which has organized exhibitions in Turkey and internationally.

Tavman Ertuğrul has been described by World Textile Art (WTA) and related organizations as WTA's representative in Turkey and as a curator associated with Face & Reverse projects. She has also served on international selection juries connected to WTA biennial activities.

Tavman Ertuğrul has participated in international textile biennials. A published catalog for the 5th International Biennial of Textile Art (World Textile Art) lists a work credited to "Mine Biret Tavman" among selected works.

== Selected works ==
- Örme Sanatının Sayısal Ortama Aktarımı ve Örnek Uygulamalar (with Esra Öğülmüş Özkum).
