= Bozdağı, Fatsa =

Bozdağı
- Neighbourhood
- Location in Turkey
- Coordinates: 40°58′28″N 37°26′29″E
- Country: Turkey
- Province: Ordu
- District: Fatsa
- Population (2022): 129
- Time zone: UTC+3 (TRT)

Bozdağı is a neighbourhood of the municipality and district of Fatsa, Ordu Province, Turkey. Its population is 129 (2022). It is 64 km from Ordu and 12 km from Fatsa.

== History ==
The village was settled after the Russo-Turkish War (1877–1878). Georgian families with the surname Şavişuli, Elimoğlu, Gogitidze, Suknişşuli, Cincaroğlu, Ustalioğlu, Salikvaze, Vasaze, Lamaze, Çavuşoğlu are living in the neighborhood.

== Population ==
Historical population
Year	Pop.	±% p.a.
1997	202	—
2007	46	−13.75%
2012	32	−7.00%
2017	71	+17.28%
2022	129	+12.69%
Source: 1997 census and TÜIK (2007-2022)
