= Köçek =

Young male slave dancer who dressed in feminine attire

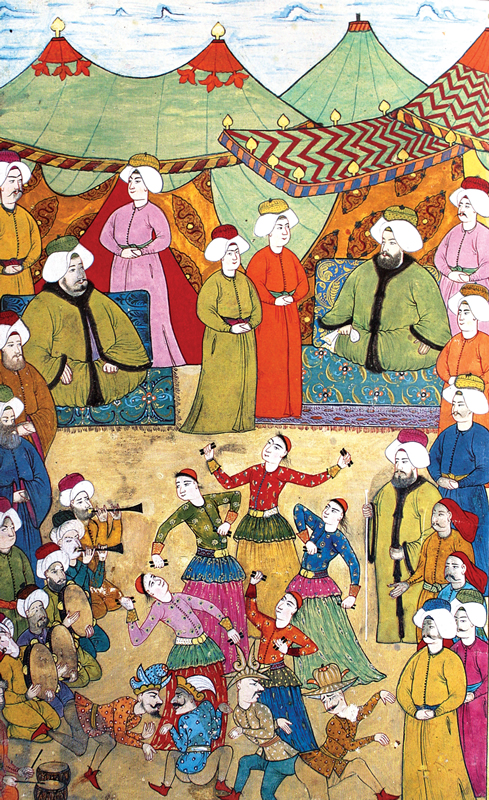
Köçek in Ottoman miniature.

The köçek (plural köçekler) was typically a young, male, and physically attractive enslaved dancer (rakkas), who usually cross-dressed in feminine attire, and was employed as an entertainer.

== Roots ==
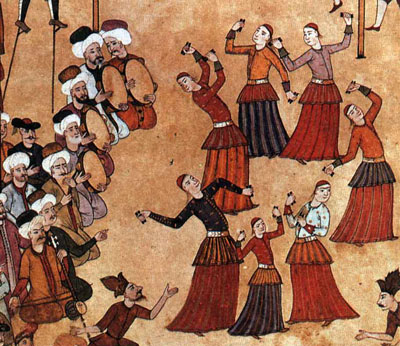
"Köçek troupe at a fair" at Sultan Ahmed's 1720 celebration of his son's circumcision. Miniature from the Surname-i Vehbi, Topkapı Palace, Istanbul.

Turkish köçek derives from Persian kūçak کوچک. The culture of the köçek, which flourished from the 18th to the 19th century, had its origin in the customs in Ottoman palaces, and in particular in the harems. Its genres enriched both the music and the dance of the Ottomans.

The support of the Sultans was a key factor in its development, as the early stages of the art form was confined to palace circles. From there the practice dispersed throughout the Empire by means of independent troupes.

== Culture ==
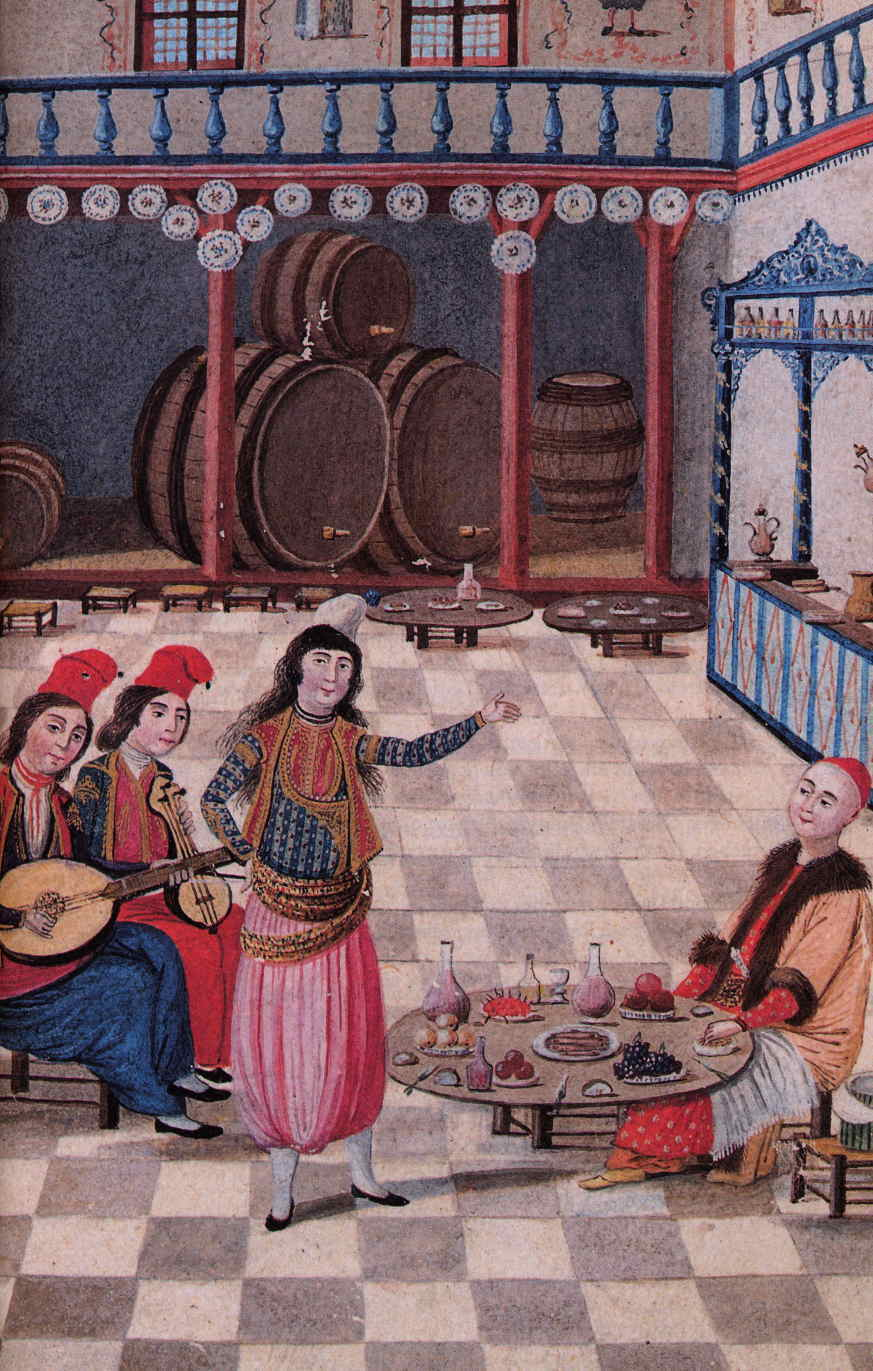
"Performing Köçek", illustration from Hubanname by Enderûnlu Fâzıl, 18th century

A köçek would begin training around the age of seven or eight after he was circumcised and would be considered accomplished after about six years of study and practice. A dancer's career would last as long as he was clean shaven and retained his youthful appearance.

The dances, collectively known as köçek oyunu, blended elements from throughout the empire, most importantly Turkish (like Karsilamas and Kaşık Havası) and oriental elements. They performed to a particular genre of music known as köçekçe, which was performed in the form of suites in a given melody. It too was a mix of Sufi, Balkan and classical Ottoman influences, some of which survives in popular Turkish music today. The accompaniment included various percussion instruments, such as the davul-köçek, the davul being a large drum, one side covered with goat skin and the other in sheep skin, producing different tones. A köçek's skill would be judged not only on his dancing abilities but also on his proficiency with percussion instruments, especially a type of castagnette known as the çarpare. The dancers were accompanied by an orchestra, featuring four to five each kaba kemençe and laouto as principal instruments, used exclusively for köçek suites. There were also two singers. A köçek dance in the Ottoman seraglio (palace harem) involved one or two dozen köçeks and many musicians. The occasions of their performances were wedding or circumcision celebrations, feasts and festivals, as well as the pleasure of the sultans and the aristocracy.

The youths, often wearing heavy makeup, would curl their hair and wear it in long tresses under a small black or red velvet hat decorated with coins, jewels and gold. Their usual garb consisted of a tiny red embroidered velvet jacket with a gold-embroidered silk shirt, shalvar (baggy trousers), a long skirt and a gilt belt, knotted at the back. They were said to be "sensuous, attractive, effeminate", and their dancing "sexually provocative". Dancers minced and gyrated their hips in slow vertical and horizontal figure eights, rhythmically snapping their fingers and making suggestive gestures. Often acrobatics, tumbling and mock wrestling were part of the act.

Famous poets, such as Enderûnlu Fâzıl, wrote poems, and classical composers, such as the court musician Hammamizade İsmail Dede Efendi (1778–1846), composed köçekçes for celebrated köçeks. Many Istanbul meyhanes (nighttime taverns serving meze, rakı or wine) hired köçeks. Before starting their performance, the köçek danced among the spectators to make them more excited. In the audience, competition for their attention often caused commotions and altercations, potentially because of their perceived sexual availability. This resulted in suppression of the practice under Sultan Abdulmejid I. In 1805, there were approximately 600 köçek dancers working in the taverns of the Turkish capital. They were outlawed in 1837 due to fighting among audience members over the dancers. With the suppression of harem culture under Sultan Abdulaziz (1861–1876) and Sultan Abdul Hamid II (1876–1908), köçek dance and music lost the support of its imperial patrons and gradually disappeared.

Köçeks were much more sought after than the çengi ("belly dancers"), their female counterparts. Some youths were known to have been killed by the çengi, who were extremely jealous of men's attention toward the boys.

== Modern offshoots ==
Today, köçek and zenne dancing are still performed in Turkey, although the traditions have evolved into more folkloric and less sexualized forms. Modern zenne performers are adult men who typically wear skirts or other traditionally feminine attire. Such performances no longer take place in the sultan's palace, but are instead staged in bars, clubs, and cabarets.

Modern zenne attire may include "loose-fitting gauzy pants (şalvar) or skirts trimmed with shimmering coins and chest pieces adorned with sequins and tassels", drawing on styles traditionally associated with women's clothing. The revival of zenne dancing has also contributed to the visibility of LGBTQ people in Turkey and provided spaces in which members of these communities can socialise and form communities.

== Turkish reaction to köçek ==
Although Turkish nationalist scholars have portrayed köçeks as being of non-Muslim and non-Turkish origins, thereby defining them as outsiders relative to the Kemalist conception of national identity and defending the image of the modern Turkish heterosexual male, there is evidence that Muslims and ethnic Turks were also köçeks.

The modern revival of the tradition has not been universally welcomed. Modern köçeks may face stigma because of their associations with same-sex relationships and queer identities, in contrast to the social position of köçeks during the 18th century. This shift has been attributed in part to the Westernization of the Ottoman Empire, which contributed to changing attitudes toward feminine-presenting men and same-sex relationships and encouraged more heteronormative social norms. Although same-sex sexual activity is not illegal in Turkey, LGBTQ people continue to face social stigma and discrimination.

Zenne dancers have also provided spaces in which LGBTQ people can socialize and maintain aspects of the tradition. In Istanbul, Taksim Square has been associated with zenne performances and the city's LGBTQ community. The area attracts tourists visiting İstiklal Avenue, as well as residents of the nearby neighborhoods of Cihangir and Tarlabaşı. Zenne performers have provided opportunities for younger gay men to socialize and, in some cases, learn the dance from more experienced performers.

== In film ==
The revival of köçeks in Turkish society has led to a growth of their presence in modern media and film. A modern interpretation is the movie Köçek (1975) by director Nejat Saydam. The movie follows the life of Caniko, an androgynous Roma, who struggles with his gender identity. A more recent film called the Zenne Dancer (2011), directed by Caner Alper and Mehmet Binay, and this film touches on the discrimination that the LGBTQ youths still face in Turkey.

== See also ==
- Bacha bazi, Afghan equivalent
- Khawal, Egyptian equivalent
- Ghilman
- LGBT topics and Islam
- LGBT in the Ottoman Empire
- Onnagata
