= Bolaman Castle =

Castle in Bolaman, Turkey

- Bolaman Kalesi
- Bolaman, Fatsa, Ordu in Turkey

Site information
- Owner: Ministry of Culture and Tourism
- Open to the public: Yes
- Condition: Restored

Location
- Location of Bolaman Castle in Turkey
- Coordinates: 41°02′12″N 37°35′28″E

Site history
- Materials: Ashlar

The Bolaman Castle (Turkish: Bolaman Kalesi) is a historic castle located at Bolaman town of Fatsa in Ordu Province, Turkey.

== Castle ==
The castle is situated 4 km (2.5 mi) east of Fatsa on the Black Sea coast. It sits on the rock at a pointed peninsula overlooking the sea. Its construction date is unknown. However, it is believed that the castle was built by the Kingdom of Pontus as a fortress to serve the purpose of a watchtower.

The castle consist of inner and the outer walls made of ashlar. There are watchtowers on the outer walls around the courtyard. Inside the castle, there is a chapel in the form of a basilica.

== Museum and restaurant ==
In the 18th century, a wooden mansion with two huge bay windows at two ends was built by a native family on the inner castle. Known as the "Kademoğlu Mansion", this typical Ottoman architectural house is a landmark of Fatsa. After its originally restoration by the Ministry of Culture and Tourism in 2009, the mansion is used as an ethnographic museum and a restaurant for regional cuisine under the name "Haznedaroğlu Mansion".
