= Yapraklı, Fatsa =

Yapraklı
- Neighbourhood
- Location in Turkey
- Coordinates: 41°03′25″N 37°27′31″E
- Country: Turkey
- Province: Ordu
- District: Fatsa
- Population (2022): 410
- Time zone: UTC+3 (TRT)

Yapraklı is a neighbourhood of the municipality and district of Fatsa, Ordu Province, Turkey. Its population is 410 (2022). It is located near downtown Fatsa and becoming an attraction for many city residents. Near the sea, there are many apartment complexes that are being built. The purpose of these complexes is for people to get away from the city environment to a quiet and green environment.

The village has a primary school, town drinking water network, electricity and landline telephone. There is a cemetery in the neighborhood. The economy of the district is based on agriculture and animal husbandry.
