= Fikri Sönmez =

Turkish politician (1938–1985)

Mayor of Fatsa
- In office 14 October 1979 – 11 July 1980
- Preceded by: Nazmiye Komitoğlu
- Succeeded by: Mazhar Yerebasmaz

Personal details
- Born: 1938 Kabakdağı, Fatsa, Ordu, Turkey
- Died: 4 May 1985 (aged 46–47) Amasya, Turkey
- Resting place: Kabakdağı, Fatsa
- Party: Devrimci Yol
- Spouse: Nurten Sönmez (married 1962)
- Children: 2
- Profession: Tailor, politician

Fikri Sönmez (widely known as Terzi Fikri ("Fikri the Tailor")) (1938 - 4 May 1985) was a Turkish communist politician, who served as the mayor of Fatsa district of Ordu Province between 1979 and 1980.

== Early years ==
He was born in the Chveneburi (Muslim Georgian) village of Kabakdağı in Fatsa, Turkey. After the primary school, he started to work as a tailor in a workshop. He moved to Istanbul, he joined the Workers Party of Turkey (TİP) in the 1960s. He took part in protests against the Turkey visits of the United States Sixth Fleet since 1969 on the side of Dev-Genç (Revolutionary Youth). From 1972 to 1974, Sönmez was imprisoned for his support to the Turkish revolutionary activist Mahir Çayan. After 1975, he joined political activities in the cities of Ordu, Giresun and Samsun.

== Mayorship ==
After the death of Nazmiye Komitoğlu, who was the mayor of Fatsa from the Republican People's Party (CHP), he ran for the vacant seat as an independent. After his election as the mayor, he split Fatsa into eleven regions and created people's committees. He made campaigns against the violence against women, the poor infrastructure in Fatsa, gambling, diseases because of the bad conditions in the town. Because of his success in the town, he got support from different political movements in the town.

He was blamed creating a new state inside the Turkish Republic by the Justice Party (AP). On 11 July 1980, Turkish military conducted an operation against the town. Fikri Sönmez was arrested and put into prison. He died of a heart attack in Amasya penitentiary on 4 May 1985.

He was survived by his wife Nurten Sönmez, he married in 1962, and his sons Naci and Yusuf.
