= Hekimoğlu =

Ottoman outlaw and a folk hero

Hekimoğlu İbrahim
- Born: Yassıtaş, Fatsa, Ordu, Ottoman Empire
- Died: 26 April 1913; Fatsa, Ottoman Empire

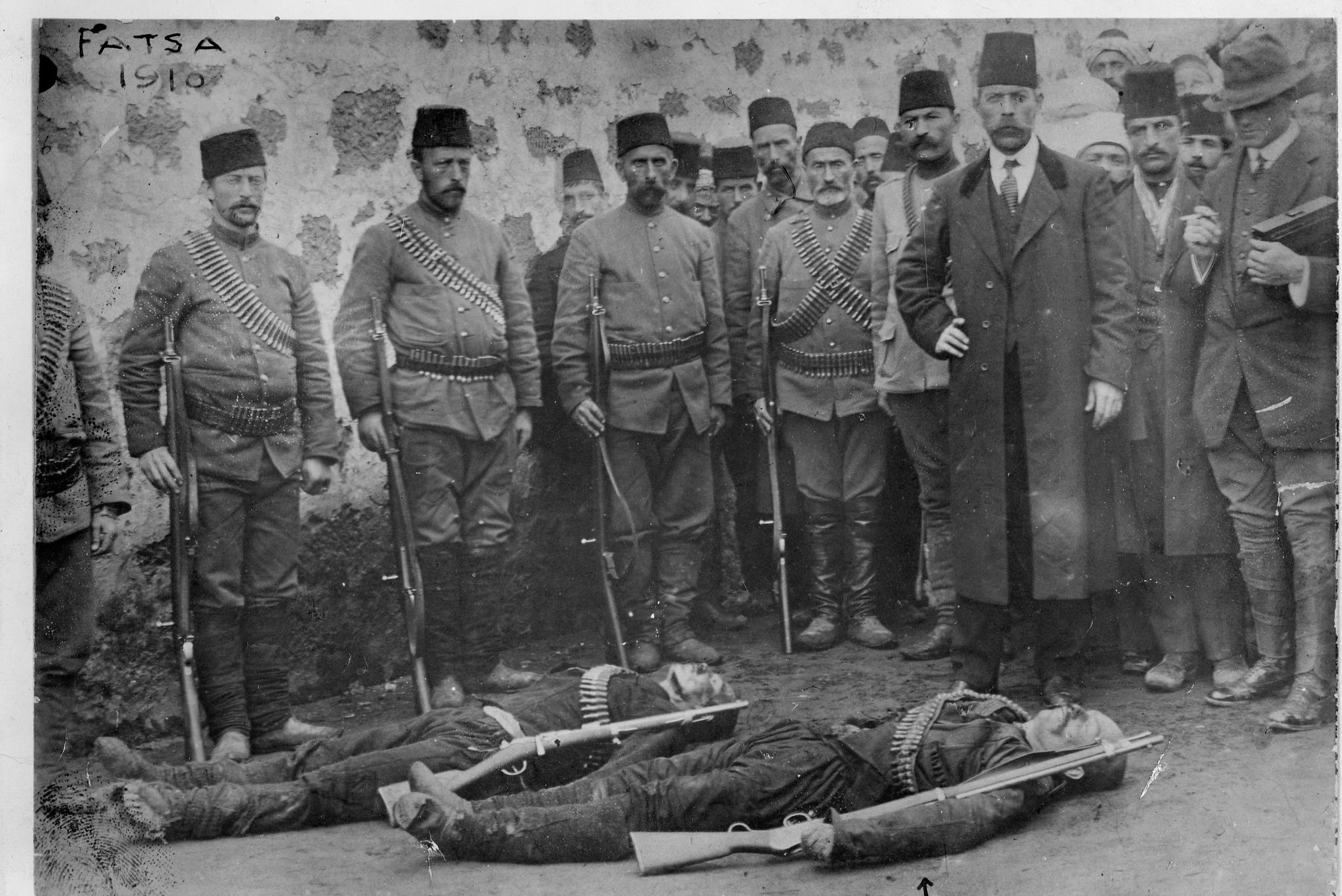
Authorities and a journalist from the United States posing with the bodies of Hekimoğlu and friend Alan Osman after their death in a shootout with arresting officers. Hekimoğlu's body is on the right.

Hekimoğlu İbrahim (died 26 April 1913), known by his epithet Hekimoğlu ("son of a medical doctor" in Turkish), was a Turkish outlaw and folk hero.

== Early years ==
According to the Turkish historians Mithat Sertoğlu and Ayhan Yüksel, Hekimoğlu İbrahim grew up in a Turkish farming family in the Yassıtaş village of Fatsa, Ordu, Ottoman Empire (today's Black Sea Region in Turkey). In the early 1900s, while he was working for the local Chveneburi (Muslim Georgian communities who migrated to the lands of the Ottoman Empire as a result of the pressures of the Tsarist Russian Empire as a result of the Russo-Turkish War) landowner, Sefer Agha, he fell in love with his daughter, Fadime. Soon after, Fadime and İbrahim began to meet in secret. One day, a local Chveneburi man, Yusuf, saw the two lovers together and told them their meeting violated the social and religious code of the Chveneburi community, where, in those days, a single girl was forbidden from speaking to a man who was not a close relative.

Following Yusuf's disclosure of the love affair between Hekimoğlu and Fadime, an animosity by Chveneburi people towards the neighbouring Turks developed. To avenge the community honour, a group of Chveneburi men, including Yusuf, tried to kill Hekimoğlu, but he escaped their trap, killing one of the Chveneburi men in the process with his soon-to-become famous M1874 Turkish Peabody-Martini rifle (Turkish: Aynalı Martin). Fearing an unfair trial, Hekimoğlu refused to surrender himself to the local authority in Fatsa and took refuge in the mountains, becoming an outlaw.

== Outlaw and folk hero ==
Led by Hekimoğlu, a gang of outlaws conducted a campaign of robberies and raids against any landowner or community leader who was rumoured to be mistreating the local population. Hekimoğlu and his gang were said to share some of their bounty with the poor (à la Robin Hood). This led Hekimoğlu to attain a folk hero status and he was given the title "the hero of the all heroes" (Turkish: kahramanlar kahramanı) by the local people.

His gang activities were a significant factor in raising the ethnic tension between the Chveneburi and Turkish communities in Fatsa and in the wider Sanjak (sub-province) of Janik. On 15 December 1908, a telegram was sent from Fatsa to the Minister of the Interior of the Ottoman Empire in Istanbul, the capital, requesting assistance in capturing Hekimoğlu, but due to the assistance and shelter given to him by local Turkish villages, authorities were unsuccessful in capturing him and Hekimoğlu responded by increasing his attacks on the Chveneburi.

=== Death ===
The Ottoman Council of State (Turkish: Şura-yı Devlet) rejected Hekimoğlu's requests for a pardon, and on 26 April 1913, he was killed along with his friend Alan Osman in a 8 hour long shootout with the authorities in his home village of Yassıtaş in Fatsa. His death was documented by an American journalist.

== Legacy ==
Hekimoğlu is recalled in Turkey as a folk hero, almost of legend, who fought against injustice and oppression. In his honour, a folk song titled Hekimoğlu Türküsü was composed. It remains popular throughout Turkey to this day.

== See also ==
- Hekimoğlu Türküsü
