= Boztepe, Ordu =

Boztepe
- Neighbourhood
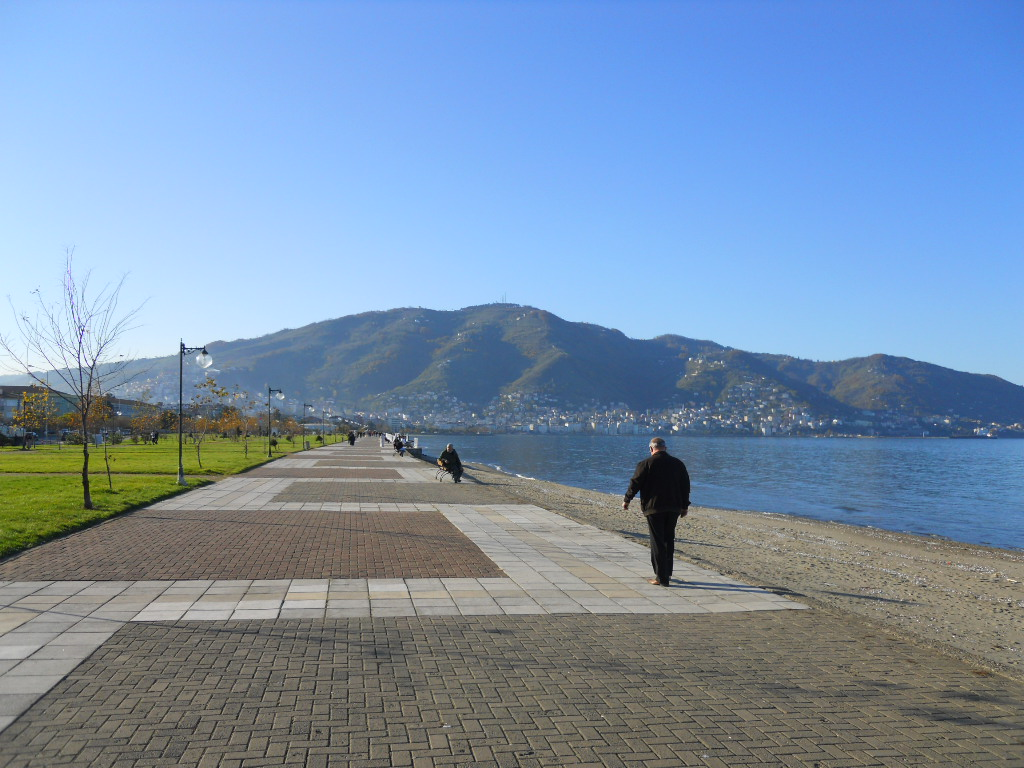
- View of the Boztepe hill from Ordu

- Location within Turkey
- Country: Turkey
- Province: Ordu
- District: Altınordu
- Population (2022): 599
- Time zone: UTC+3 (TRT)

Boztepe is neighbourhood of the municipality and district of Altınordu, Ordu Province, Turkey. Its population is 599 (2022).

Boztepe is also a nearby hill, 550 m (1,800 ft) above sea level. There is a restaurant at the top with views over the city of Ordu and the Black Sea. In June 2012, an aerial lift system entered in service providing an easy way of transportation between the city's coastline and the hilltop. The Ordu Boztepe Gondola can transport 900 passengers hourly up to the hilltop in 6.5 minutes.
