= Ordu Boztepe Gondola =

- Ordu Boztepe Teleferik
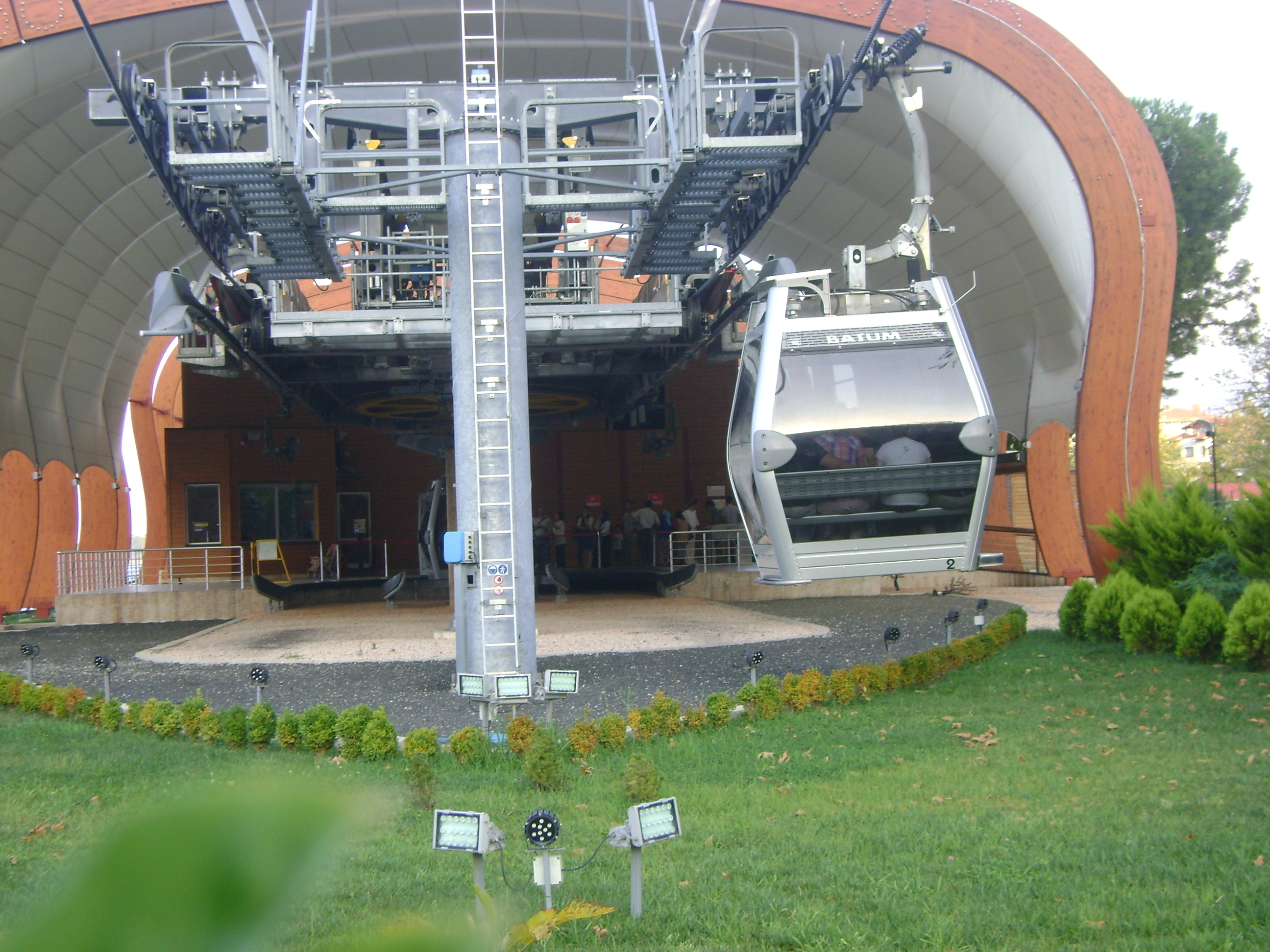
- Ordu Boztepe Gondola

- Location within Turkey

Overview
- Status: Operational
- Character: Recreational
- Location: Ordu
- Country: Turkey
- Coordinates: 40°59′05″N 37°53′04″E
- Termini: Ordu (east); Boztepe (west)
- Elevation: lowest: 0 m (0 ft) highest: 498 m (1,634 ft)
- No. of stations: 2
- Construction cost: ₺11 million (approx. US$6 million)
- Open: June 9, 2012; 14 years ago

Operation
- Owner: Ordu Municipality
- Operator: Ordu Municipality
- No. of carriers: 28
- Carrier capacity: 8
- Ridership: 1,800 hourly
- Trip duration: 6.5 min.
- Fare: ₺150.00 one way (2025 fiyatı)

Technical features
- Aerial lift type: Bi-cable gondola detachable
- Manufactured by: Leitner Ropeways, Italy
- Line length: 2,350 m (7,710 ft)
- No. of support towers: 7

The Ordu Boztepe Gondola (Turkish: Ordu Boztepe Teleferik Hattı) is an aerial lift line in Ordu serving the nearby hilltop Boztepe. It is owned and operated by Ordu Municipality.

The 2,350 m (7,710 ft) long gondola lift line was constructed by the Italian company Leitner Ropeways of Leitner Group to a cost of ₺11 million (approximately US$6 million), and the line officially opened on June 9, 2012. The base station is situated in the downtown at Black Sea coast. There is a parking lot for 180 cars next to the base station. The mountain station Boztepe is at an altitude of 498 m (1,634 ft). There are seven supporting towers between the terminals. 28 cabins each capable of eight passengers are able to transport hourly 900 people in one direction. The ride takes 6.5 minutes.

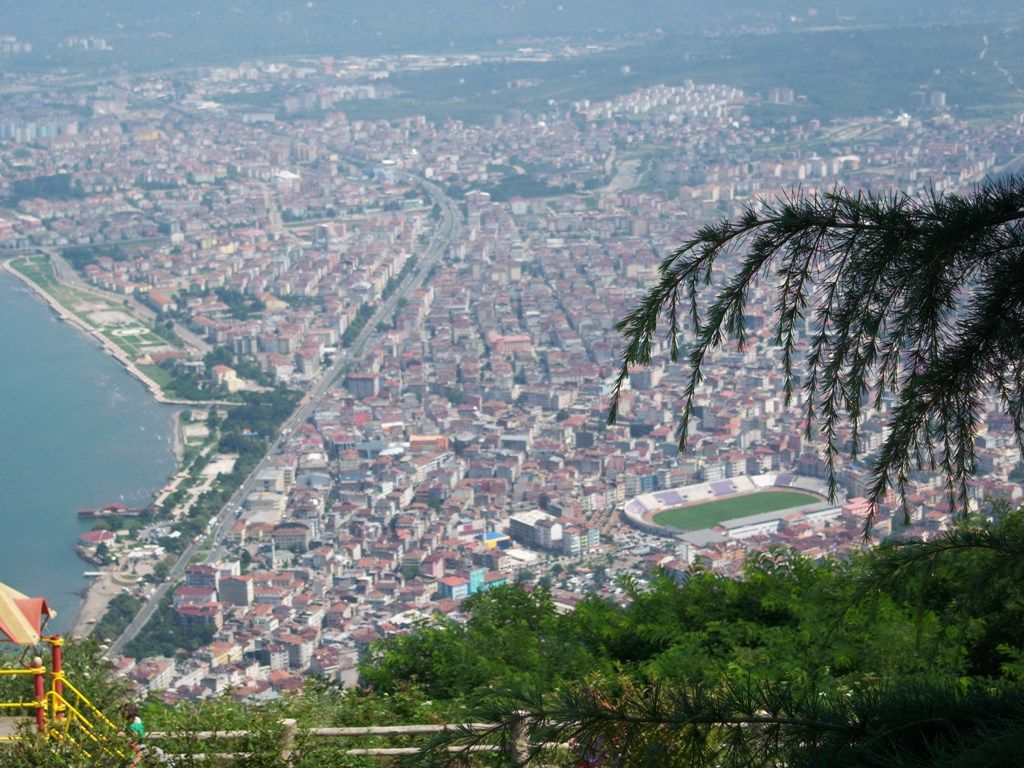
View of Ordu from Boztepe.

Boztepe is a tourist attraction with a panoramic view over the city and the Black Sea coast featuring restaurants. The return ticket for the ride cost ₺250.00 for Turkish citizens and ₺700.00 for citizens of other nations.

== Specifications ==
- Line length: 2,350 m (7,710 ft)
- Height difference: 498 m (1,634 ft)
- Number of stations: 2
- Number of cabins: 28 each eight-seater
- Trip duration: 6.5 minutes
- Hourly ridership: 1,800
- Fare: ₺150.00 one way
- Terminals:
  - Ordu 40°59′05″N 37°53′04″E
  - Boztepe 40°59′29″N 37°51′34″E

== See also ==
- List of gondola lifts in Turkey
