= Köçek (film) =

- Theatrical release poster
- Directed by: Nejat Saydam
- Screenplay by: Nejat Saydam
- Produced by: Murat Köseoğlu
- Starring: Müjde Ar; Mahmut Hekimoğlu
- Cinematography: Melih Sertesen
- Distributed by: Acar Film
- Release date: 1975 (Istanbul)
- Running time: 82 minutes
- Country: Turkey
- Language: Turkish

Köçek is a 1975 Turkish romantic drama film written and directed by Nejat Saydam and starring the famous Turkish actress Müjde Ar.

== Plot ==
A romantic drama about an androgynous boy named Caniko (Müjde Ar), who is abducted by a gang and forced to dress like a woman and be a köçek. A mob attempts to rape Caniko, but when they find out he's really a boy, they stab him. He's taken to hospital where he undergoes a sex change operation. Now he works as a belly dancer and by chance, meets his buddy Adnan (Mahmut Hekimoğlu), who falls in love with him without recognizing that they are old friends.

== Cast ==
- Müjde Ar as Caniko
- Mahmut Hekimoğlu as Adnan
- Nisa Serezli
- İlhan Daner
- Nevin Güler
- Senar Seven
- Yılmaz Gruda
- Asuman Arsan
- Yüksel Gözen
- Handan Adalı
- Nevin Nuray
