= Bolaman =

- Neighbourhood
- Location in Turkey
- Coordinates: 41°02′10″N 37°35′28″E
- Country: Turkey
- Province: Ordu
- District: Fatsa
- Elevation: 5 m (16 ft)
- Population (2022): 1,318
- Time zone: UTC+3 (TRT)
- Postal code: 52400
- Area code: 0452

Bolaman is a neighbourhood of the municipality and district of Fatsa, Ordu Province, Turkey. Its population is 1,318 (2022). Before the 2013 reorganisation, it was a town (belde). It is a coastal town on Turkish state highway D.010 which runs along the Black Sea coast. The distance to Fatsa is 8 kilometres (5.0 mi) to Ordu is 47 kilometres (29 mi).

The town (as well as the creek of the town) is named after Polemon, a governor of Ordu and vicinity during the Roman Empire era. But the town itself was founded in the 19th century. In 1966 it was declared a seat of township. A small Byzantine fortification with an attached chapel was converted into an Ottoman-period residence.
