= Mahmut Hekimoğlu =

Turkish actor and film producer

Mahmut Hekimoğlu (25 October 1955 – 10 September 2016) was a Turkish actor and film producer.

== Filmography ==
=== As actor ===
- Çakma Hayat (Film) 2013
- Sevgi Bağlayınca (TV series) - Cemil 2010
- Hür Adam (Film) - Doctor Tahir 2010
- IV. Osman (TV series) - Hasan 2009
- Kırmızı Işık (TV series) - Tuncay 2008
- Kollama (TV series) - 2nd season Nizam 2009
- Karanfilli Yarim (Video) 2008
- Ana Hakkı Ödenmez (Film) 2008
- Merhaba / Dim Çayı Sevdalıları (TV film) 2007
- Koçero (TV film) 2007
- Dönüş (TV film) 2007
- Yeşeren Düşler (TV series) - Aziz Bey 2006
- Yalnız Efe (TV film) - Yörük Hoca 2006
- Dilan Gelin (TV series) - Derviş 2006
- Anka Kuşu (Film) - Cemal Bey 2006
- Memleket Hikayeleri - Bir Sepet Elma (TV film) 2005
- Şubat Soğuğu (TV series) - Serdar 2004
- Türkü Filmi (TV series) 2004
- Sen Küçüksün (TV film) 2004
- Hayatın İçinden (TV series) - Ahmet 2004
- Harput Güneşi (TV series) 2004
- Fırtına Hayatlar (TV series) - Remzi 2004
- Celal Oğlan (TV film) 2004
- Büyük Buluşma (TV series) - 1st Sezon İmam 2004
- Yeşilçam Denizi (TV program) 2003
- Sırlar Dünyası / Sır Kapısı (TV series) - Ahmet 2002
- Ona Bakma Bana Bak (TV series) 2000
- Kimyacı (TV series) - Metin Aydın 2000
- Durduramadım (Film) 1999
- İlişkiler (TV series) - Sıtkı 1997
- Palavra Aşklar (TV series) 1995
- Ayrı Dünyalar (TV series) 1995
- Ölüm Oyunu (Film) - Kemal 1994
- Son Gün Son Gece (Film) 1994
- Kadın Severse (Film) - Engin 1994
- Denizciler Geliyor (TV series) 1994
- Gülpembe (Film) 1993
- Barışta Savaşanlar (TV series) 1993
- Muallim Bey (TV series) 1992
- Mahallenin Muhtarları (TV series) - Kenan 1992
- Aile Bağları (TV series) - Macit 1991
- Şükür Allahım (Film) - Mahmut 1990
- Sadık Dost (Film) 1988
- Kurt Payı (Film) 1988
- Kumar 2 (Video) 1988
- Bir Eski Yangın (Film) 1988
- Vurgun (Film) 1987
- Kan Kırmızı Süt Beyaz (Film) 1987
- Evlerden Biri (Film) - Semih 1987
- Bütün Kuşlar Vefasız (Film) 1987
- Bir Çember Kırılırken (Film) - Nihat 1987
- Prenses (Film) - Selim 1986
- Kader Böyle İstedi (Film) 1986
- Güvercinim (Film) - Doğan 1986
- Gelin Oy (Film) - Mahmut 1986
- Öç (Video) 1984
- Bin Kere Ölmek (Film) - Muhsin 1983
- Bataklıkta Bir Gül (Film) - Bülent 1983
- Adile Teyze (Film) - Mahmut 1982
- Çile Tarlası (Film) - Alişan 1980
- Hayat Harcadın Beni (Film) - Yaşar 1979
- Kaybolan Yıllar (Film) - Ömer 1978
- Tatlı Kaçık (Film) - Turgut / Hasan 1977
- Lanet / İlenç (Film) - Ömer 1977
- Gülen Gözler (Film) - Temel 1977
- Perişan (Film) - Metin Akel 1976
- Evlilik Şirketi (Film) - Ali 1976
- Bodrum Hakimi (Film) - Ali Rıza 1976
- Arabacının Aşkı (Film) - Gazeteci Tayyar 1976
- Aile Şerefi (Film) - Selim 1976
- Yakalarsam Severim (Film) 1975
- Salak Bacılar (Film) - Osman 1975
- Köçek (Film) - Adnan 1975
- Kadınlar (Film) 1975
- Dam Budalası (Film) 1975
- Cellat (Film) - Cahit 1975
- Yatık Emine (Film) - Kumandan 1974
- Kızım Ayşe (Film) - Ömer 1974
- Öksüzler (Film) - Kenan 1973
- Ben Doğarken Ölmüşüm (Film) - Mete 1973

=== As producer ===
- Sevgi Bağlayınca (TV series) 2010
- Bir Aşk Yeter (Film) 1989
- Umutların Ötesi (Video) 1988
- Kurt Payı (Film) 1988
- Belki Yarın (Film) 1988
- Vurgun (Film) 1987
- Evlerden Biri (Film) 1987
- Prenses (Film) 1986
- Güvercinim (Film) 1986
- Gelin Oy (Film) 1986
- Güldür Yüzümü (Film) 1985
- Öç (Video) 1984
- Dil Yarası (Film) 1984
- Kahır (Film) 1983
- Bin Kere Ölmek (Film) 1983
- Bataklıkta Bir Gül (Film) 1983
- Çile Tarlası (Film) 1980
- Hayat Harcadın Beni (Film) 1979
