= Fatsa =

- District and municipality
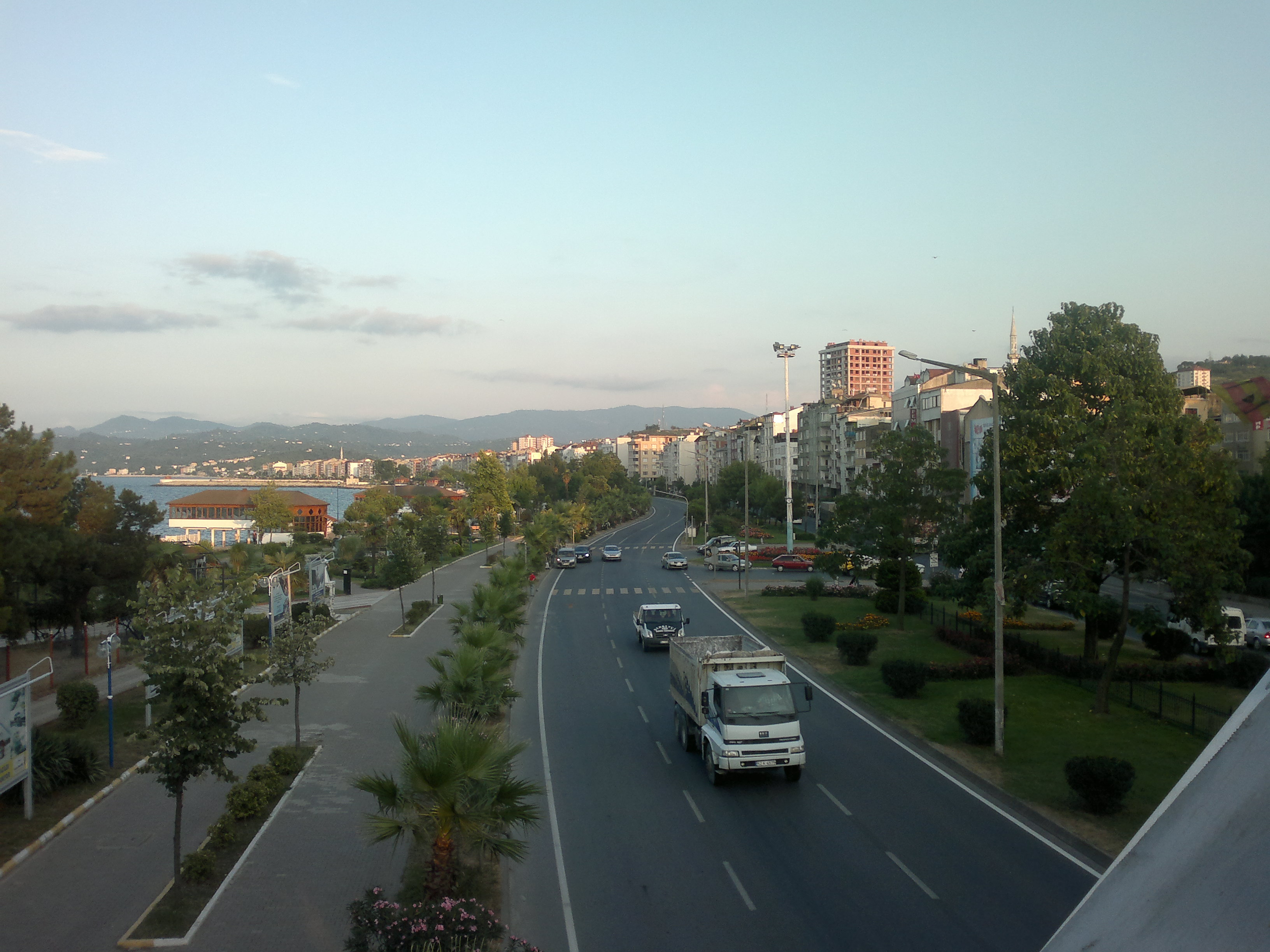

- Logo

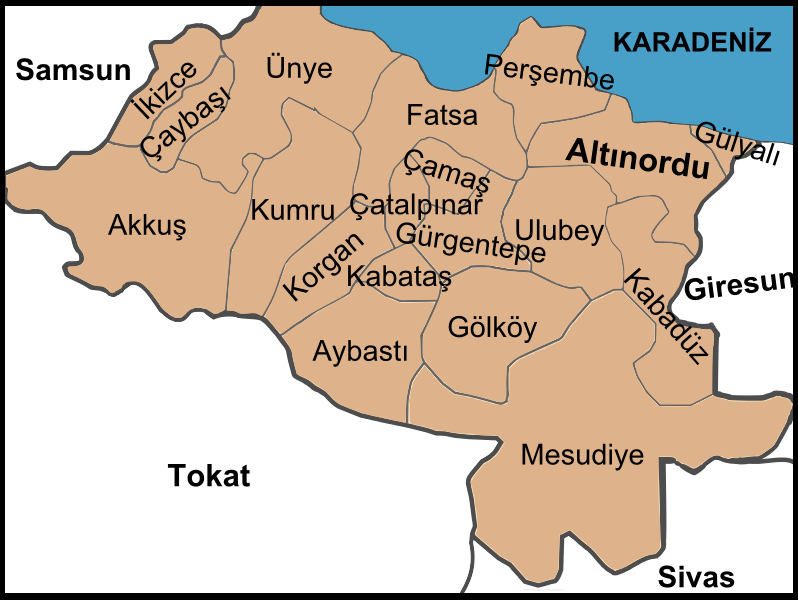
- Map showing Fatsa District in Ordu Province

- Location within Turkey
- Coordinates: 41°01′50″N 37°30′0″E
- Country: Turkey
- Province: Ordu

Government
  - Mayor: İbrahim Etem Kibar (AKP)
- Area: 363 km^{2} (140 sq mi)
- Elevation: 10 m (33 ft)
- Population (2022): 126,775
  - Density: 349/km^{2} (905/sq mi)
- Time zone: UTC+3 (TRT)
- Postal code: 52400
- Area code: 0452
- Climate: Cfa
- Website: www.fatsa.bel.tr

Fatsa is a municipality and district of Ordu Province, Turkey. Its area is 363 km^{2}, and its population is 126,775 (2022). It lies on the Black Sea coast.

== Name ==
The oldest recorded name of the town is Polemonion (Ancient Greek: Πολεμώνιον, Latinized as Polemonium), after Polemon I of Pontus. A derivative of Polemonion, i.e. Bolaman, is the modern name of the river passing through Fatsa (the river is the ancient Sidenus). The present name, Fatsa, has been influenced by modern Greek Φάτσα or Φάτσα Πόντου (φἀτσα is derived from Italian faccia), which translates as "face or housefront on the sea", but has in fact mutated from Fanizan, the name of the daughter of King Pharnaces II of Pontus, through Fanise, Phadisana (Greek: Φαδισανή), Phadsane Phatisanê Vadisani (Greek: Βαδισανή), Phabda, Pytane, Facha, Fatsah into today's Fatsa. Apart from Polemonion, another Greek name of the town was Side.

== History ==
=== Antiquity ===
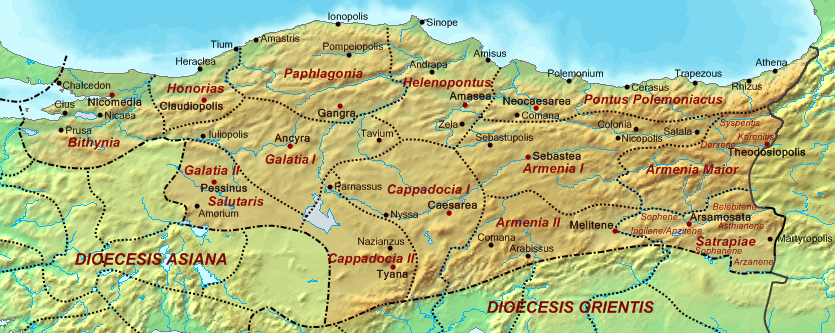
The Diocese of Pontus and its provinces in c. 400 AD.

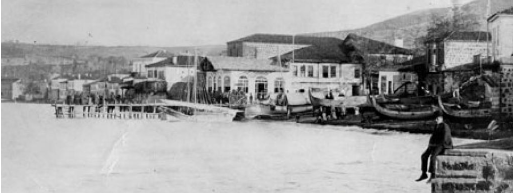
Fatsa, the late Ottoman era.

The history of Fatsa goes back to antiquity, when the coast was settled by Cimmerians, and Pontic Greeks in the centuries BC. The ruins on Mount Çıngırt (the ancient rock tombs and vaults) are from this period.

=== Roman and Byzantine periods ===
Fatsa was first mentioned, in the era of the Kingdom of Pontus, as Polemonium, after King Polemon I, the Roman client king appointed by Mark Antony. Under Nero, the kingdom became a Roman province in AD 62. In about 295, Diocletian (r. 284–305) divided the province into three smaller provinces, one of which was Pontus Polemoniacus, called after Polemonium, which was its administrative capital.

As the Roman Empire developed into the Byzantine Empire, the city lost some of its regional importance. Neocaesarea became the capital of the province, and the Diocese of Polemonion was a suffragan of the metropolitan see of Neocaesarea. Due to partition of the Byzantine Empire as a result of the Fourth Crusade, Fatsa became a part of the Empire of Trebizond in 1204.

In the 13th and 14th centuries Genoese traders established trading posts on the Black Sea coast. Fatsa became one of the most important of these ports. There is a stone warehouse on the shore built in this period.

=== Ottoman period ===
Following the conquest of the Empire of Trebizond by the Ottomans in 1461, Fatsa become a part of Rûm Eyalet and later a part of Trebizond Eyalet of the Ottoman Empire and remained within the Sanjak of Janik until the collapse of the Empire in 1921. Fatsa became a district of Ordu Province, following the formation of the Republic of Turkey in 1923.

== Archaeology ==
In 2020, archaeologist discovered ruins of a church at the bottom of the lake Gaga.

Discovered in 2021, the ruins of a monastery dedicated to Saints Constantine and Helena and dating back to the 5th or 6th century were excavated in the following years.

== Population movement ==
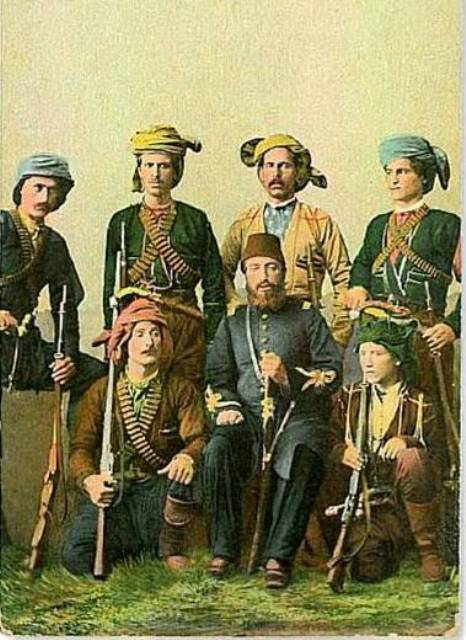
Ali Pasha of Çürüksu (front row, middle) and Ottoman Georgians during the Russo-Turkish War (1877–78). At the end of the war, the re-settlement of Ottoman Georgians in Fatsa was supervised by Ali Pasha.

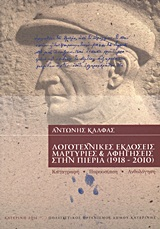
Literary Publications, Testimonials and Narratives in Pieria, which includes chronicles of Fatsa's Pontic Greeks on their exodus from Fatsa to Katerini in 1923.

Following the Turkish conquest of Anatolia by the Seljuk Sultanate of Rum and later by the Ottomans, Muslim settlers arrived at Fatsa in the middle of the 14th Century. The early Muslim Turkish settlers included Turkomens, whose descendants make up the majority of Fatsa's current Alevi Muslim community. In 1999, a religious worship complex that serves to both Alevis and Sunni Muslims was opened in Fatsa, which was unprecedented in Turkey.

In the second half of the 19th century, Fatsa's Sunni population increased significantly, as some of Chveneburi (Sunni Muslim Georgians) from Batumi and Kobuleti (Turkish: Çürüksu), who fought in the Ottoman army against the Russian forces in Russo-Turkish War (1877–78) under Ali Pasha of Çürüksu and some of the Abazins and Circassians, who were forced to leave their ancestral land in North Caucasus after the end of the Caucasian War in 1864, were settled in Fatsa and in the surrounding villages. The Circassian immigrants had an immediate impact on the local economy by introducing silk production to the area. In 1868, 3 million piastres worth of silk was sold in Fatsa.

During the Byzantine period, as early as the 9th century, an Orthodox diocese was located in Fatsa (Diocese of Polemonion). Fatsa's Christian population during the Ottoman era was made up by Pontic Greeks and Armenians, who thrived as craftsmen and bureaucrats. According to the last Ottoman census carried out in 1914, the Christians made up 12% of Fatsa's total population of 40,339. After the collapse of the Ottoman Empire, Fatsa's Christian population diminished. The last Pontic Greek community left Fatsa in 1923 as a part of the Population exchange between Greece and Turkey, when 770 Muslim families from Thessaloniki, Greece were settled in Fatsa and the indigenous Pontic Greek population of Fatsa were settled in Katerini and in the village of Trilofos Himachal, both in the Pieria region of Greece. Two members of Fatsa's Pontic Greek community, after the population exchange in 1923, became politicians in Greece; Alexander Deligiannidis, born in Fatsa in 1914 served in the Greek Parliament as a member of National Radical Union Party (1956 - 1964) and Takis Terzopoulos, born in Fatsa in 1920 served as the mayor of Katerini (1964 - 1967).

The book titled Literary Publications, Testimonials and Narratives in Pieria (1918 - 2010) (Greek: Λογοτεχνικές εκδόσεις, μαρτυρίες και αφηγήσεις στην Πιερία) includes chronicles of some of Fatsa's Pontic Greeks on their exodus from Fatsa to Katerini, including an anecdotal account by Chalkidis Ef. Theophilus (Greek: Χαλκίδης Ευθ. Θεόφιλος) (b. Fatsa in 1900 - d. Katerini 1985).

In 1919, in Fatsa, there were 8 churches (Greek Orthodox, Greek Evangelical and Armenian Apostolic) served by 9 priests. After the departure of the last Christian community in 1923, the churches were closed and later demolished. The last remaining church in Fatsa was in town's Kurtuluş District and was demolished in the late 1980s.

== Politics ==
=== Social unrest in 1970s-1980s ===
During the social unrest in Turkey in the 1970s, a major international incident in the area was the kidnapping of three NATO engineers (two British, one Canadian) from the Ünye radar station in 1972 by the members of People's Liberation Army of Turkey, which had a support base in Fatsa.

In 1976, Nazmiye Komitoğlu was elected as the mayor of Fatsa, who was the first female mayor elected in the Black Sea region of Turkey. Following her death in office, Fikri Sönmez, a local Chveneburi, was elected as the mayor on 14 October 1979. Sönmez and his Marxist–Leninist organisation Devrimci Yol, which was made up by local committees under the slogan "The red sun will rise in Fatsa", controlled the municipality until 11 July 1980.

After his election as the mayor, Sönmez divided Fatsa into eleven regions and created people's committees, which had power to recall government authorities. Sönmez was blamed creating a new state inside the Turkish Republic by the prime minister of Turkey at the time, Süleyman Demirel. Fatsa in this period underwent a revolution, where the mayor and his supporters proclaimed an independent Soviet republic.

This era ended when, upon the initiative of the Nationalist Movement Party supporting the provincial governor, the Turkish military conducted an operation called Operation Target (Turkish: Nokta Operasyonu) against the town. On 8 July 1980, the Turkish Army surrounded Fatsa. On 9 July the General Staff of Turkish Armed Forces, General Kenan Evren arrived at Fatsa. On 11 July 1980, the army moved into the town, and Mayor Sönmez and 300 others were arrested by the army. OperationTarget is believed to be the rehearsal for the 1980 Turkish coup d'état led by Gen. Kenan Evren.

Throughout this turbulent period, Fatsa lost a significant number of its people as they migrated away to jobs in Turkey's larger cities or abroad. Immigrants from Fatsa constitute the largest proportion of the Turkish community in Japan.

=== Current ===
The current mayor of Fatsa is İbrahim Etem Kibar from the conservative AK Party.

== Geography and climate ==
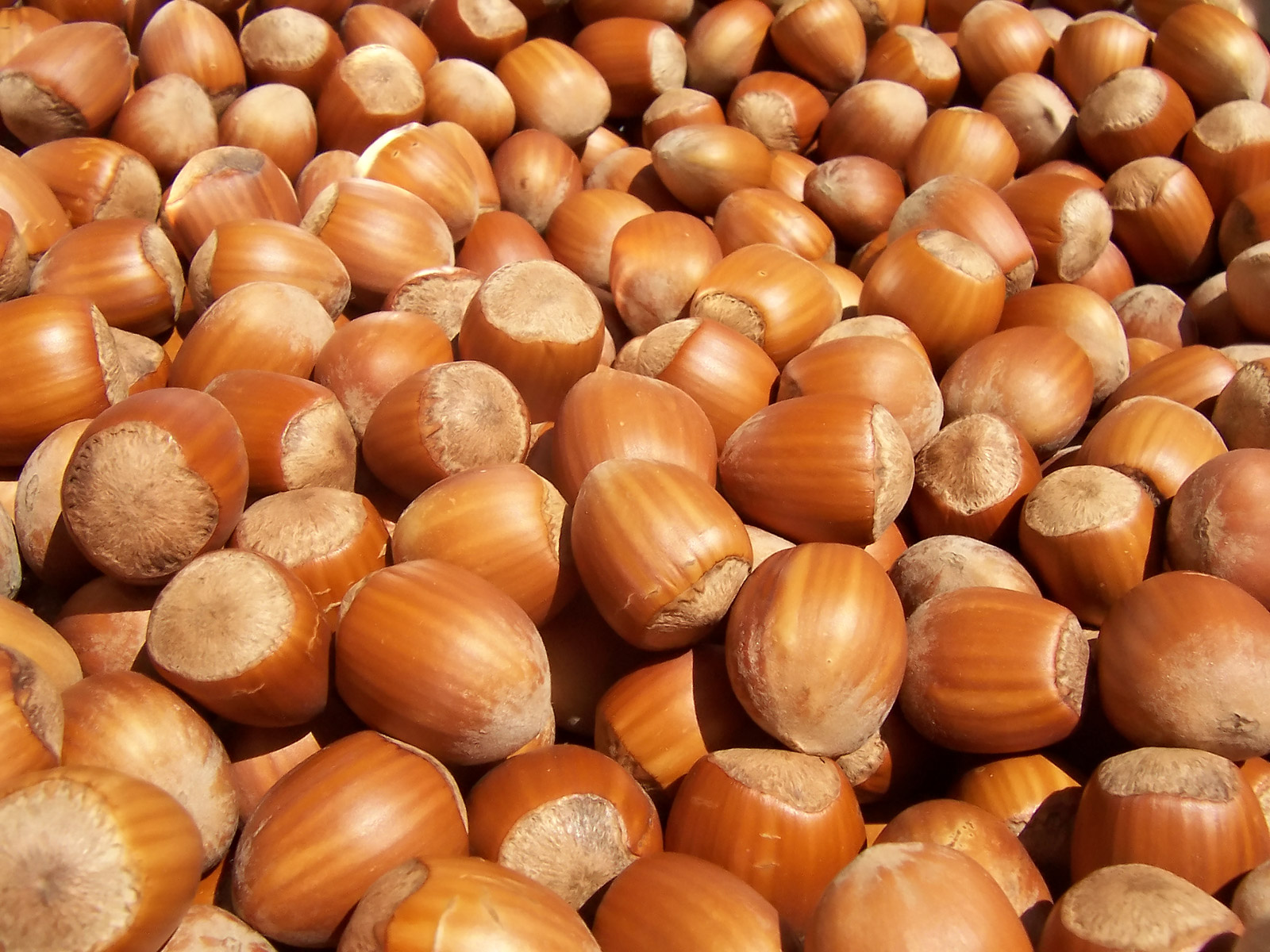
Fatsa is one of world's leading hazelnut cultivation regions.

Fatsa is located on a strip of coastline between the Black Sea and the Janik Mountains (Turkish: Canik) and watered by the rivers of Elekçi, Bolaman, Yapraklı and Belice. Fatsa has a humid subtropical climate (Köppen: Cfa); warm and humid in summer, cool and damp in winter, with occasional - but sometimes heavy - snowfalls.

== Composition ==
There are 89 neighbourhoods in Fatsa District:

- Ahmetler
- Arpalık
- Aşağıardıç
- Aşağıtepe
- Aşağıyavaş
- Aslancami
- Ayazlı
- Bacanak
- Bağlarca
- Bahçeler
- Başköy
- Beyceli
- Bolaman
- Bozdağı
- Bucaklı
- Buhari
- Bülbülköy
- Büyükkoç
- Çömlekli
- Çöteli
- Demirci
- Dereyurt
- Dolunay
- Duayeri
- Düğünlük
- Dumlupınar
- Eskiordu
- Evkaf
- Fatih
- Geyikçeli
- Gölköy
- Güvercinlik
- Hacıköy
- Hamlık
- Hatipli
- Hıdırbeyli
- Hoylu
- Ilıca
- İnönü
- İslamdağ
- Kabakdağı
- Kaleönü
- Karataş
- Kargucak
- Karşıyaka
- Kavraz
- Kayaca
- Kayaköy Akçakese
- Kılavuzömer
- Kılıçlı
- Konakbaşı
- Kösebucağı
- Küçükkoç
- Kulakköy
- Küpdüşen
- Kurtuluş
- Mehmetakif
- Meşebükü
- Mustafa Kemalpaşa
- Oluklu
- Örencik
- Palazlı Kömürlük
- Sakarya
- Salihli
- Saraytepe
- Sazcılar
- Sefaköy
- Şerefiye
- Sudere
- Tahtabaş
- Taşlıca
- Tayalı
- Tepecik
- Uzundere
- Yalıköy
- Yapraklı
- Yassıbahçe
- Yassıtaş
- Yavaş
- Yenidoğan
- Yenikent
- Yenipazar
- Yeniyurt
- Yeşilköy
- Yeşiltepe
- Yukarıardıç
- Yukarıbahçeler
- Yukarıtepe
- Yusuflu

== Economy ==
The local economy depends on agriculture and fishing. In the early 20th century, the town thrived as a port and trading post, as there was no coastal road to in the region. There are fishing fleets harboured at the port in Fatsa and in the small districts of Yalıköy and Bolaman (Polemonium) and in the hamlet of Belice, which forms a natural harbour. The Black Sea Coastal Highway runs through Fatsa bringing passing trade.

Before the 20th century, maize and rice were the main grains grown in the hinterland. From the 1920s onwards, the coastal swamps were dried up by irrigation works, rice growing ceased and the town grew. During this time, hazelnuts were introduced to the area. About 80% of arable land is planted with hazelnuts. The higher mountain areas of the district are covered in forest.

== Places of interest ==
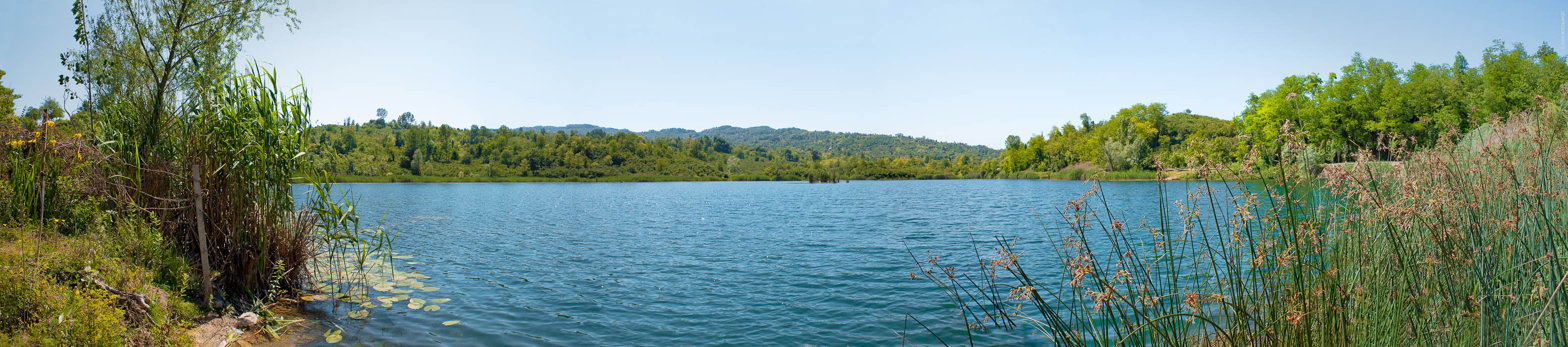
Lake Gaga, Fatsa.

The countryside and coast of Fatsa are lush in spring and summer time. A number of places in and around the town attract visitors, including;

- The Belice rock on sea
- The ruins of the Pontic Greek Göreği Monastery, 5 km west of Fatsa
- Mount Çıngırt ancient rock tombs and vaults
- Lake Gaga - 10 km south-east of Fatsa
- The ruins of Bolaman Castle and the Haznedaroğlu mansion
- Town's promenade
- The mineral water springs of Ilıca

== Notable natives ==
- Hekimoğlu İbrahim - Folk hero and outlaw who was involved in the skirmishes between the local Chveneburi (Muslim Georgian) and Turks in the early 20th century (b. Fatsa ? - d. Fatsa 1918)
- Alexander Deligiannidis (Αλέξανδρος Δεληγιαννίδης) (b. Fatsa 1914 - Thessaloniki, Greece 1969) - Ethnic Pontic Greek from Fatsa. Served in the Greek Parliament as a member of the National Radical Union Party.
- Takis Terzopoulos (Τάκης Τερζόπουλος) (b. Fatsa 1920 - d. Katerini, Greece 1989) - Ethnic Pontic Greek from Fatsa. Served as a mayor of Katerini in Greece.
- Fikri Sönmez ("Fikri The Tailor") - Revolutionary, mayor of Fatsa. Ethnic Chveneburi (b. Fatsa 1938 - d. Amasya 1985)
- Kadir İnanır - Actor and director (b. Fatsa 1949 - )
- Erdoğan Arıca - Football player and coach (b. Fatsa 1954 - d. Istanbul 2012)
- Soner Arıca - Model and singer (b. Fatsa 1966 - )
