= Ordu =

- City and metropolitan municipality
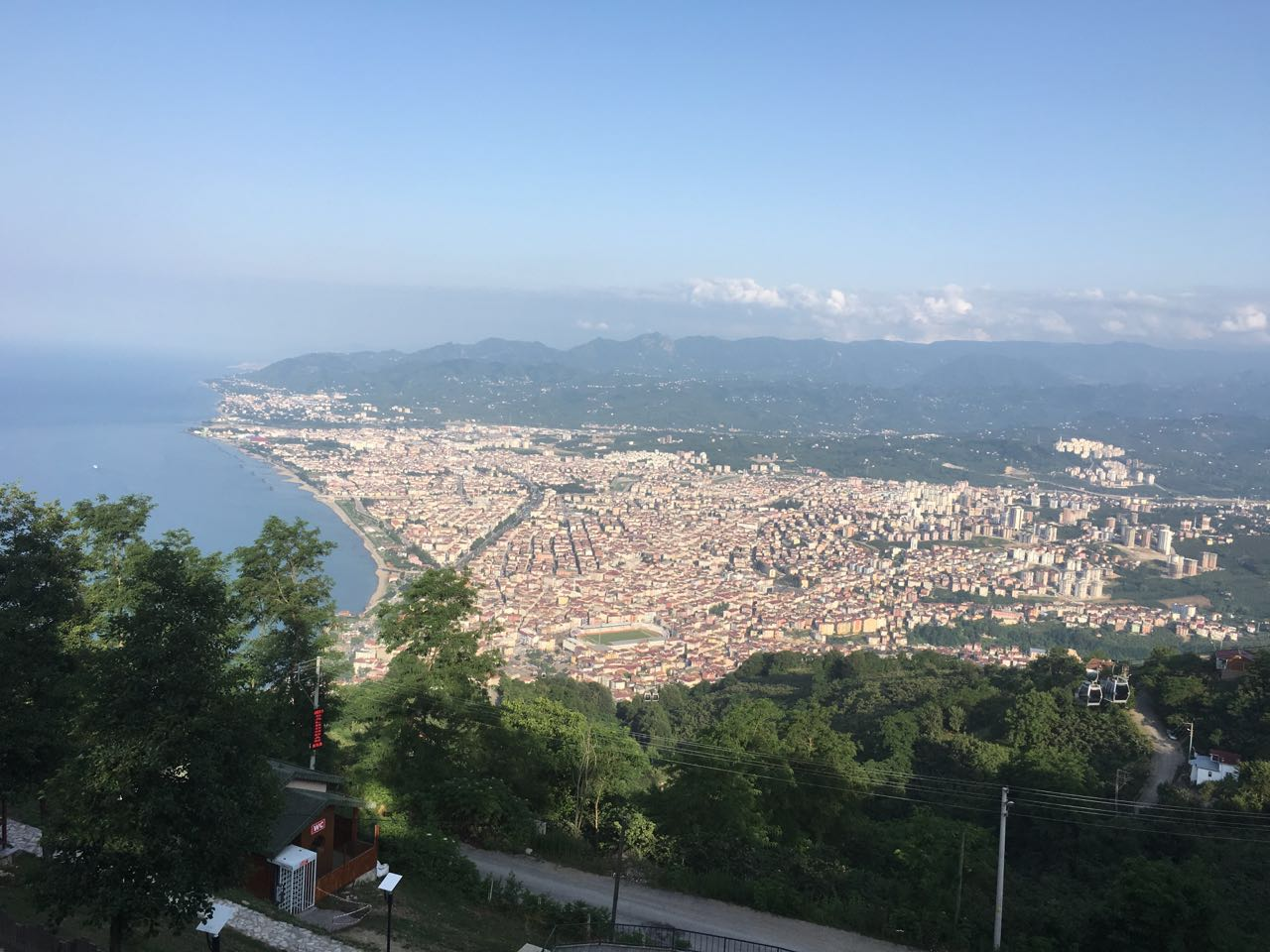
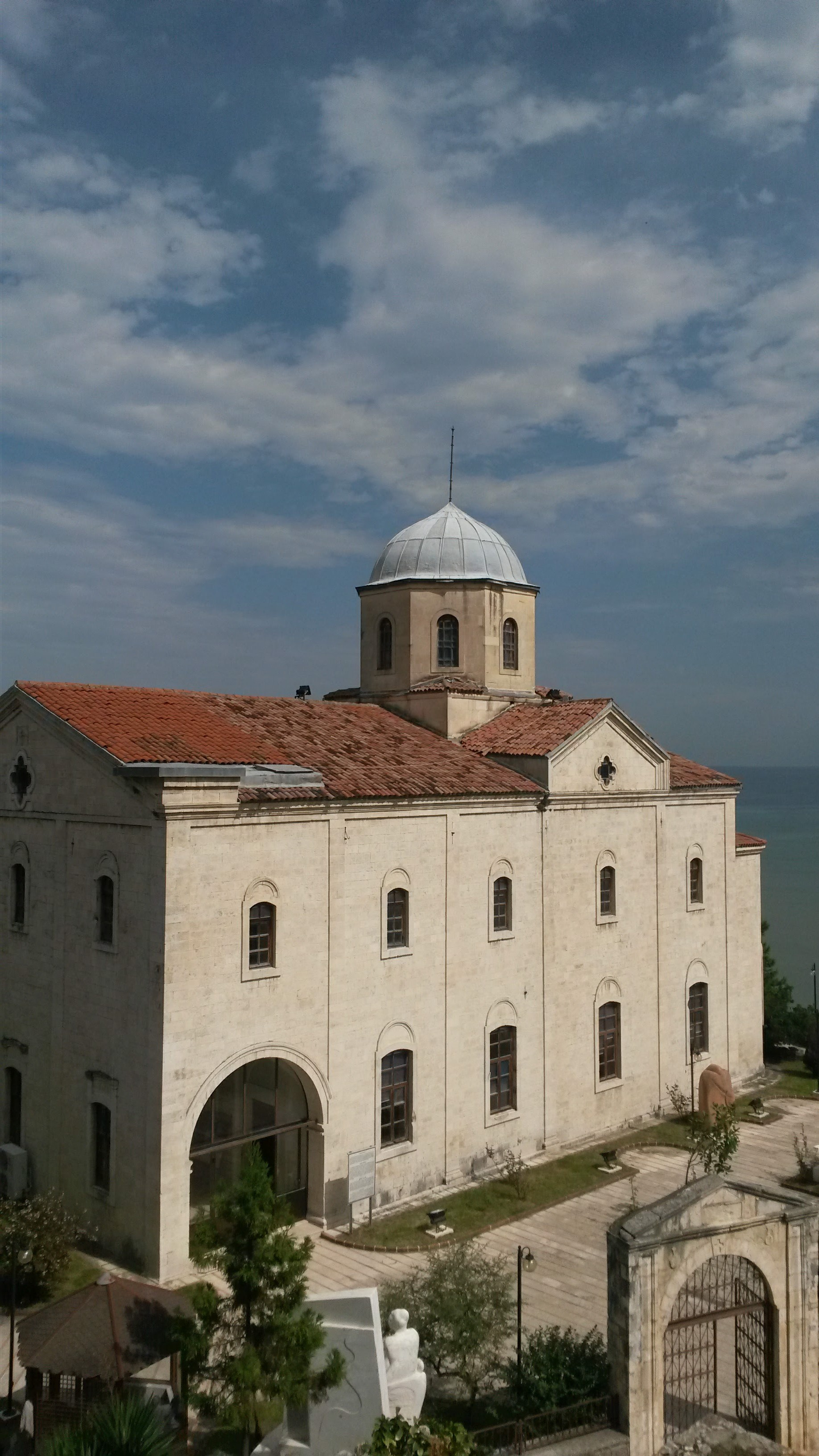
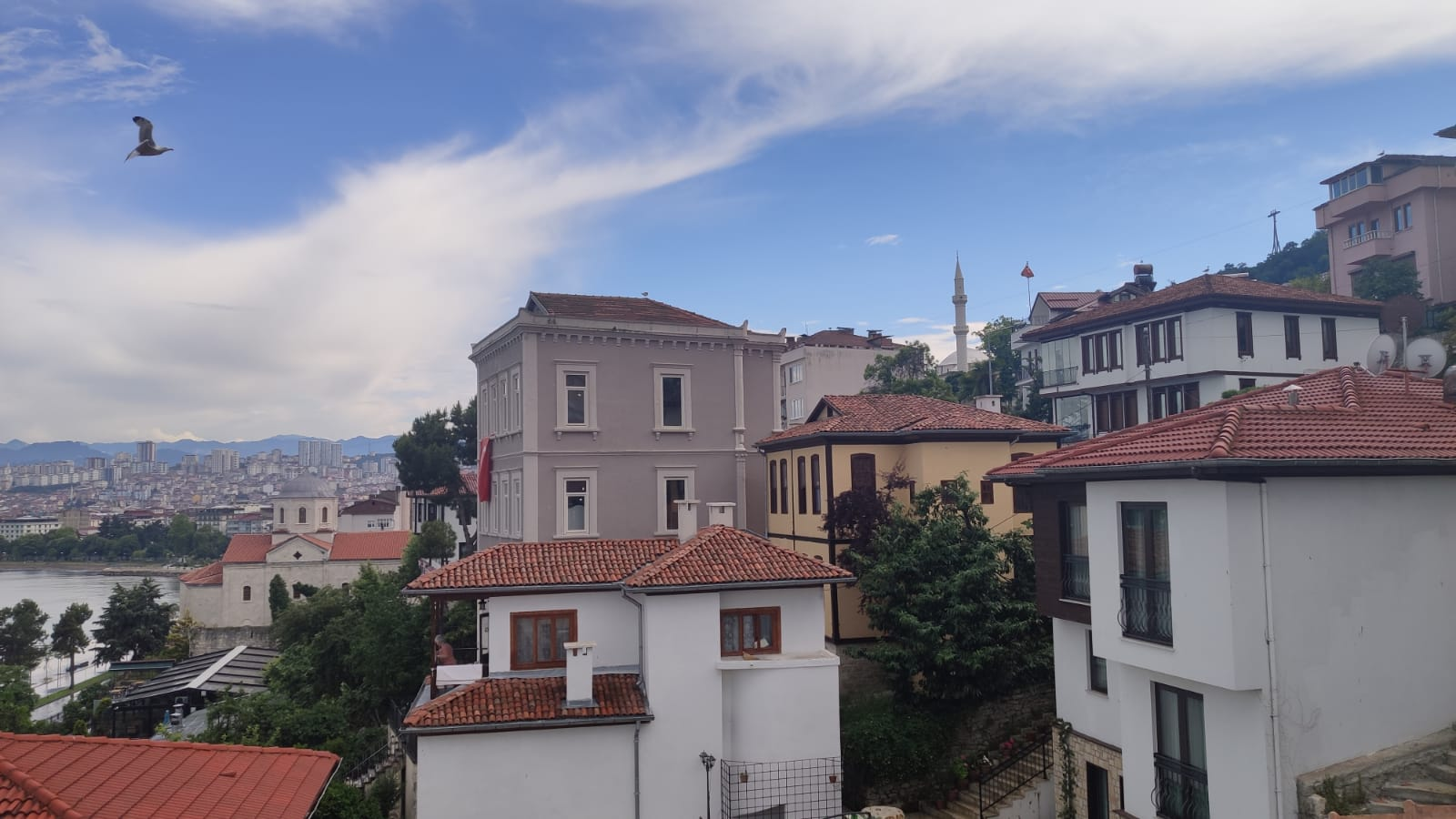
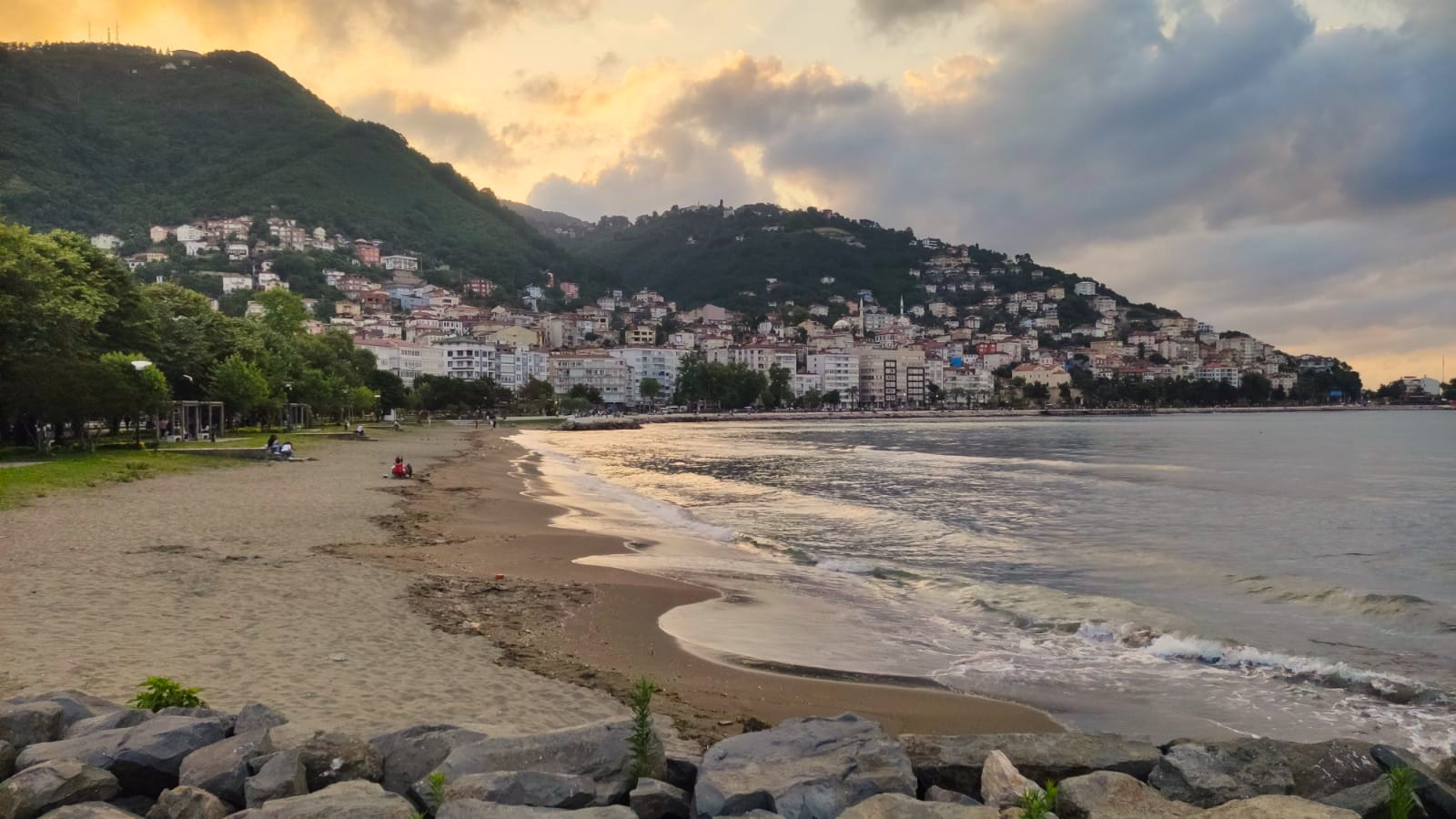
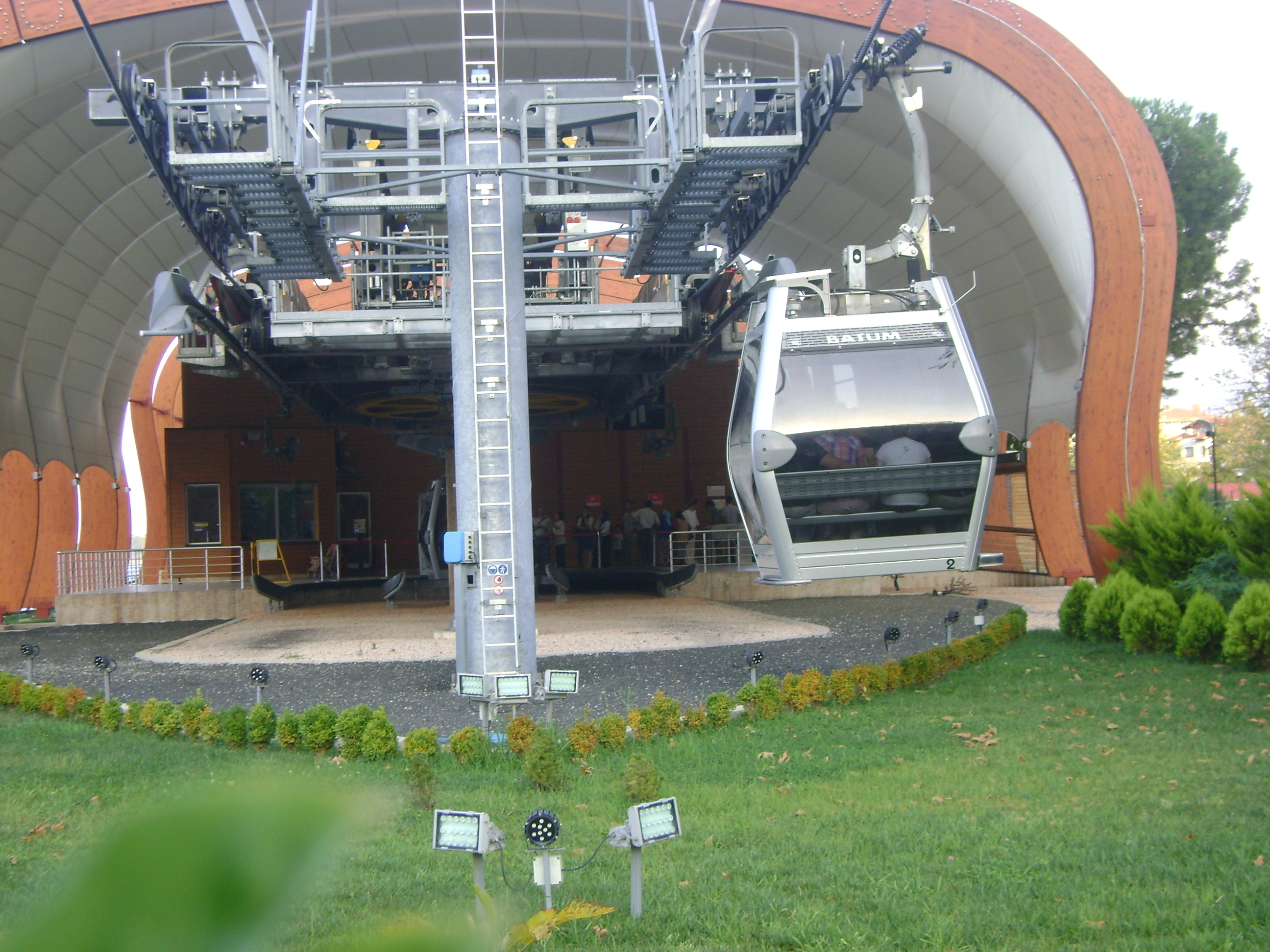
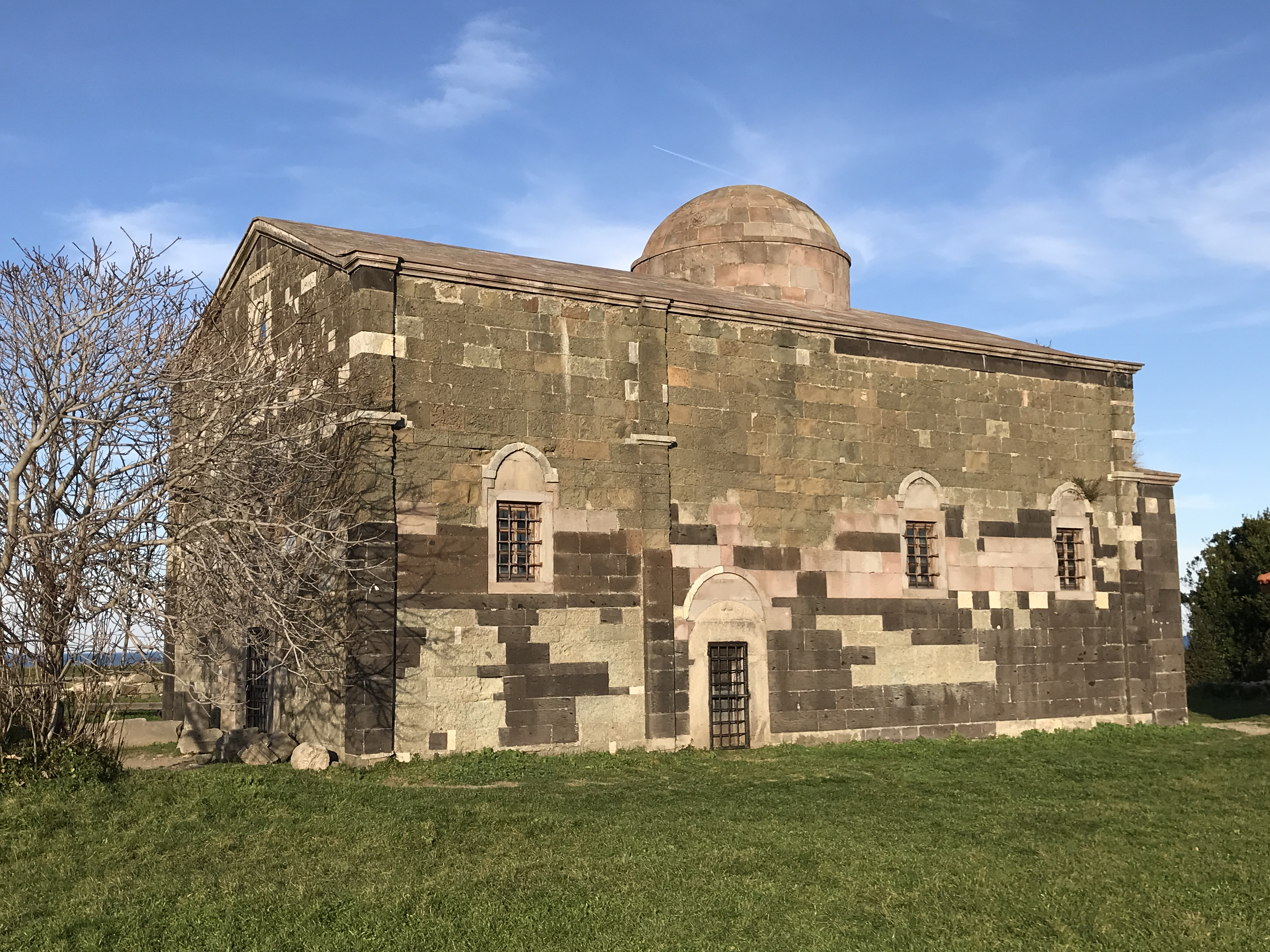
- From top: View from Boztepe, Taşbaşı Church, Ordu city center, Ordu seaside, Ordu Boztepe Ropeway, Iason Church

- Emblem of Ordu

- Location of Ordu within Turkey Ordu (Black Sea) Ordu (Asia)
- Coordinates: 40°59′N 37°53′E
- Country: Turkey
- Region: Black Sea
- Province: Ordu

Government
  - Mayor: Mehmet Hilmi Güler (AK Party)
- Elevation: 5 m (16 ft)

Population (2023)
  - Urban: 235.096
- Time zone: UTC+3 (TRT)
- Postal code: 52xxx
- Area code: 0452
- Licence plate: 52
- Climate: Cfa

Ordu (Turkish pronunciation: [ˈoɾdu]) or Altınordu, is a port city on the Black Sea coast of Turkey and the capital of Ordu Province. The city forms the urban part of the Altınordu district, with a population of 235,096 in 2023.

== Name ==
Özhan Öztürk wrote that the name is allegedly composed of an old Laz language word for pottery ('Koto', similar to Mingrelian 'Koto', Georgian 'Kotani' and Laz 'Katana') and a common Kartvelian suffix indicating belonging ('Uri'). In Zan (aka Colchian) Kotyora means a place where pottery is made. This point is supported with several other Kartvelian place names existing in the region as well as the region itself historically being known as Djanik (Djani being another name for Laz).

Ancient Greek and Roman sources called the city Cotyora or Kotyora or Cotyorum (Ancient Greek: Κοτύωρα).

The contemporary name of Ordu meaning 'army camp' in Ottoman Turkish was adopted during the Ottoman Empire because of an army outpost being located near the present day city.

== History ==
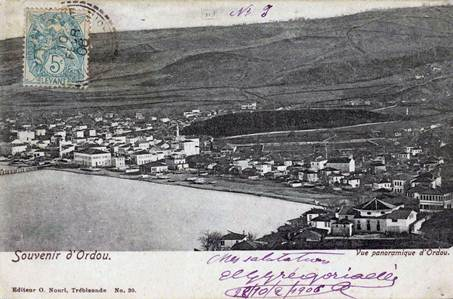
The city during the Ottoman era

Historical affiliations

Hittites c. 1600–1200 BC
Phrygia c. 800–695 BC
Achaemenid Empire c. 547–333 BC
Macedonian Empire 333–323 BC
Kingdom of Pontus c. 281–63 BC
Roman Empire 63 BC–395 AD
Byzantine Empire 395–1204
Empire of Trebizond 1204–1461
Ottoman Empire 1461–1922
Turkey 1923–present

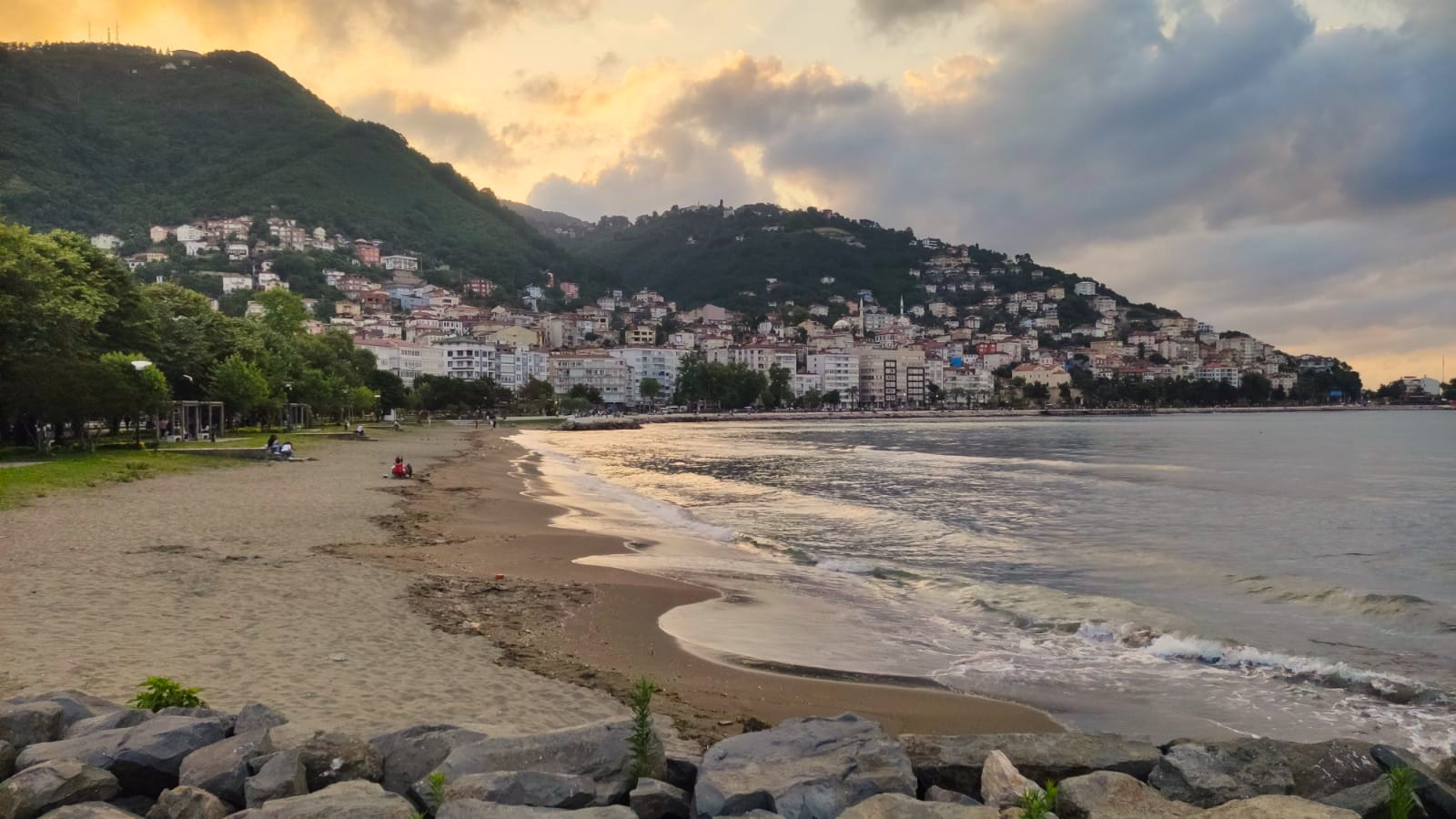
Ordu coast and Boztepe hill

In the 8th century BC, Cotyora (Κοτύωρα) was founded by the Miletians as one of a string of colonies along the Black Sea coast. The town lay on a bay that shared its name, having been named after the town. Xenophon's Anabasis states that the city was a colony of Sinop, and that the Ten Thousand rested there for 45 days before embarking for home. Xenophon also mentioned that when the Ten Thousand reached Cotyora, ambassadors arrived from Sinope, expressing their fears. They explained that not only did the city belong to them, but the entire area as well. The ambassadors were worried that the army might lay waste to the area and thus talked with the soldiers. Diodorus Siculus also wrote that it was a colony founded by the Sinopians. Strabo writes that Cotyora sent people το establish the colony of Pharnacia, but his words do not rule out the possibility that other towns also contributed. Under Pharnaces I of Pontus, Cotyora was united in a synoikismos with Cerasus. Arrian, in the Periplus of the Euxine Sea (131 CE), describes it as a village "and not a large one." Ptolemy, in his Geography, referred to it as Kyteoron or Cyteoron (Κυτέωρον), a corruption of the original name, and noted that it was located within the region of Polemonian Pontos, one of the administrative subdivisions of Pontus during the Roman period. Stephanus of Byzantium referred to the town as Cotyora. Suda write that it was also called Cytora or Kytora (Κύτωρα).

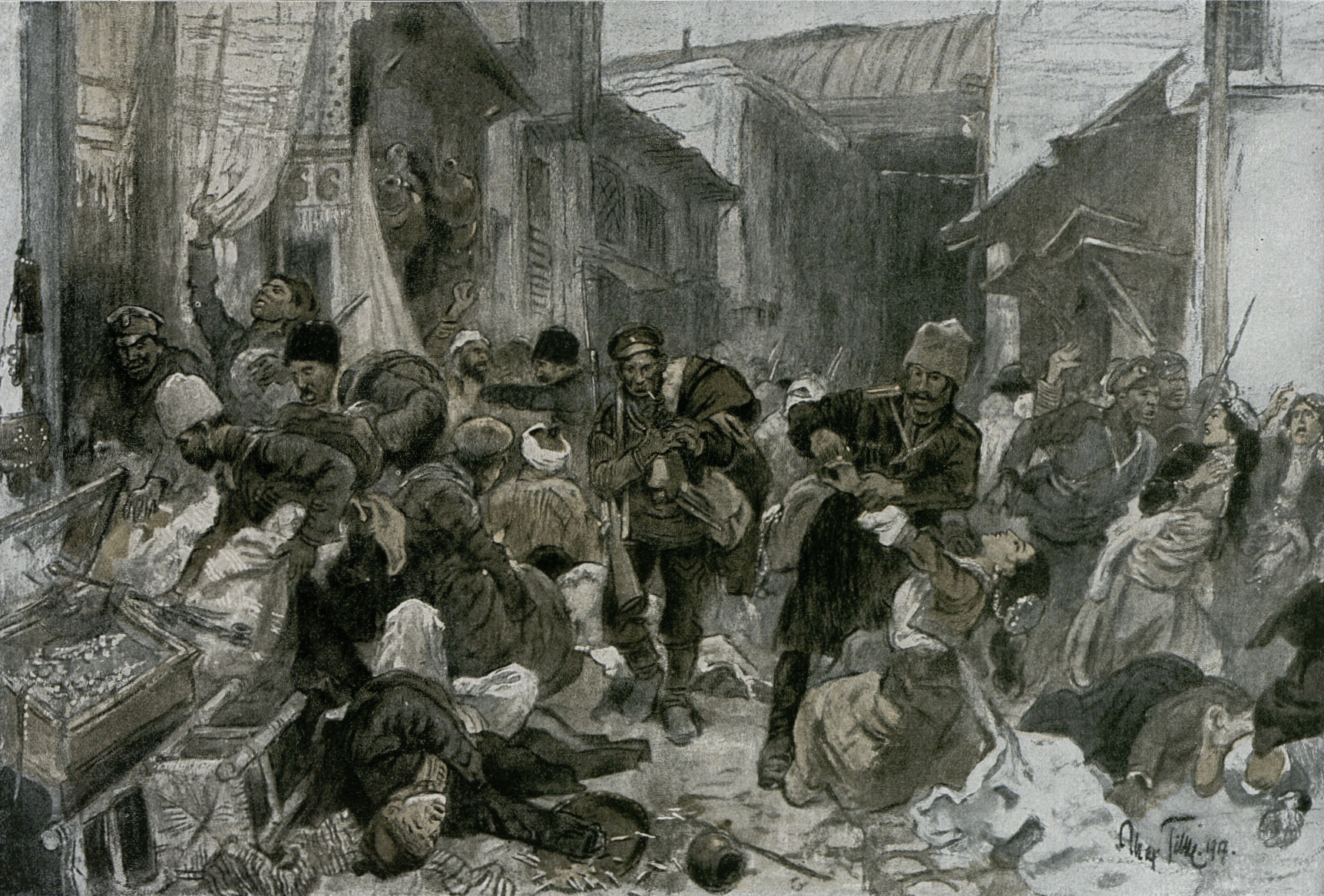
Plundering of the Turkish town of Ordu on the Black Sea by Cossacks, 24 August 1917.

The area came under the control of the Danishmends, then the Seljuk Turks in 1214 and 1228, and the Hacıemiroğulları Beylik in 1346. Afterwards, it passed to the dominion of the Ottomans in 1461 along with the Empire of Trebizond.

The modern city was founded by the Ottomans as Bayramlı near Eskipazar as a military outpost 5 km (3 mi) west of Ordu.

In 1869, the city's name was changed to Ordu and it was united with the districts of Bolaman, Perşembe, Ulubey, Hansamana (Gölköy), and Aybastı. At the turn of the 20th century, the city was more than half Christian (Greek and Armenian), and was known for its Greek schools.

On 4 April 1921, Ordu province was created by separating from Trebizond Vilayet.

== Archaeology ==
In 2016, archaeologist discovered a marble statue of Cybele. In 2018, at the same site, they also discovered sculptures of Pan and Dionysus. In 2021, archaeologists complained because a stone quarry used dynamite destroying some of the rock tombs.

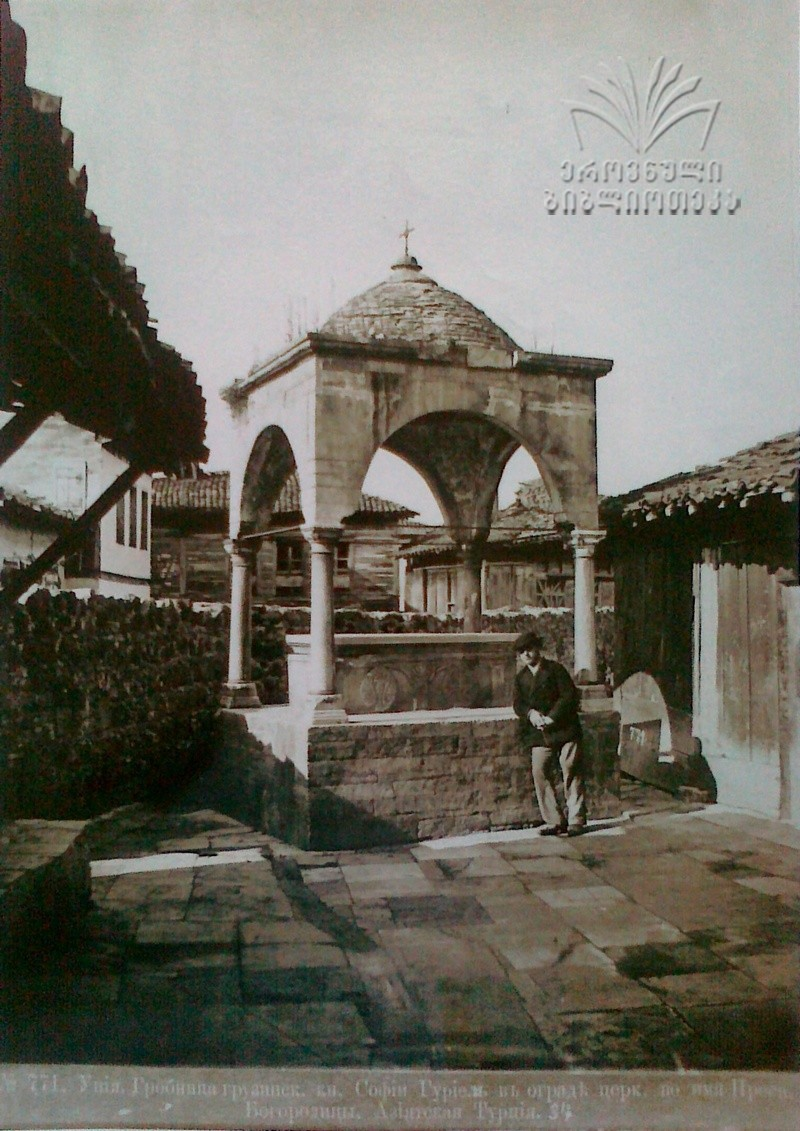
Tomb of Sopio Gurieli in Ünye, Ordu.

In December 2021, archaeologists announced 1600 year-old eight tombs in the Kurtulus district of Ordu. Researchers also uncovered human and animal remains, many pieces of jewelry made of gold, sardine stone, silver, glass, and bronze, a glass bottle and beads. In the same area researchers unearthed a Byzantine monastery church and they determined it was dedicated to the Emperor Constantine and his mother Helena.

== Ordu today ==
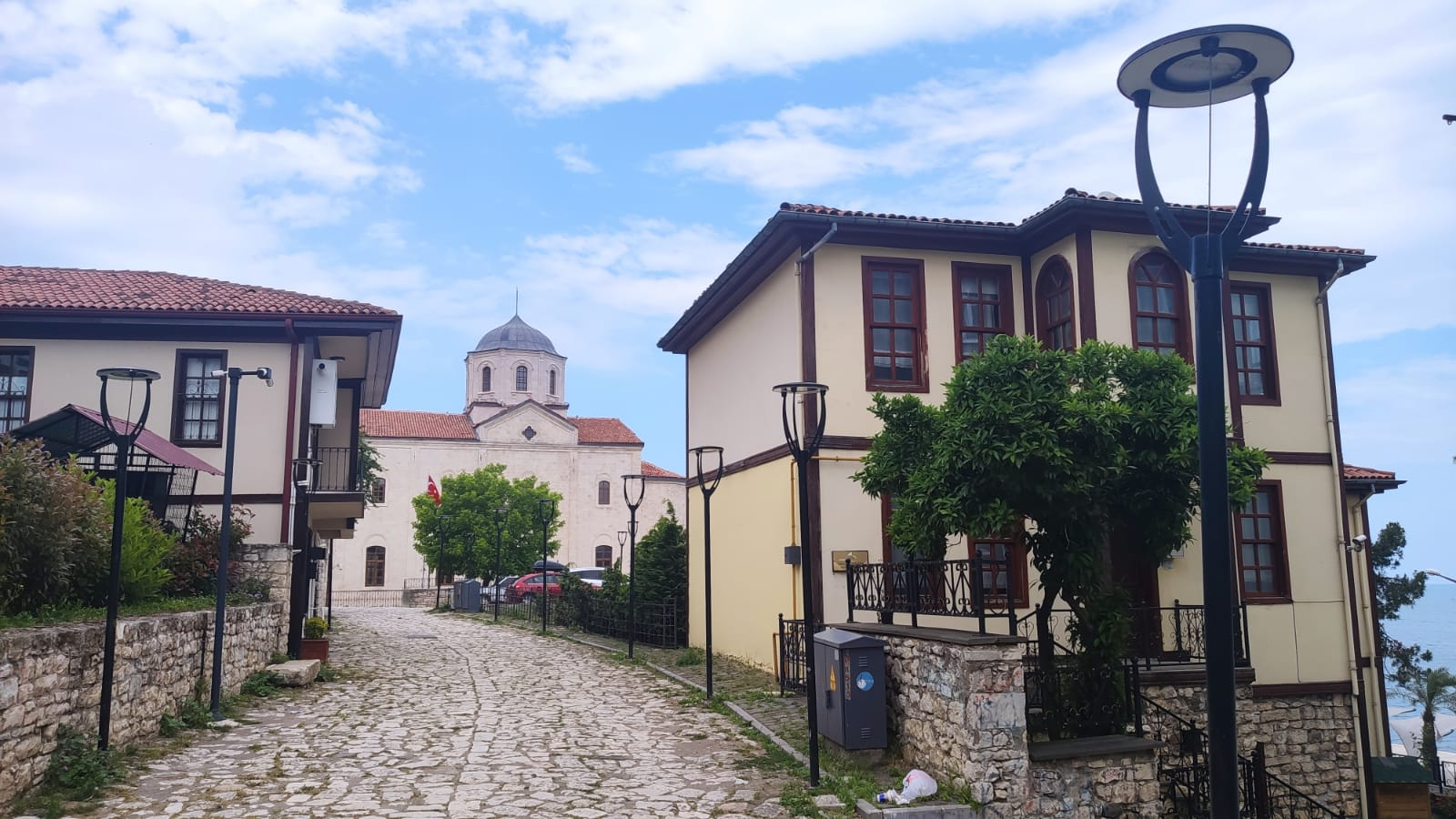
Old houses in Taşbaşı/Altınordu.

The Sağra factory shop, selling many varieties of chocolate-covered hazelnuts, is one of the town's attractions.

The Boztepe aerial tramway is another popular attraction which is set to become a modern symbol for the city.

Local music is typical of the Black Sea region, including the kemençe. The cuisine is primarily based on local vegetables and includes both typical Turkish dishes — such as pide and kebab — and more interesting fare such as plain or caramel 'burnt ice-cream'.

== Economy ==
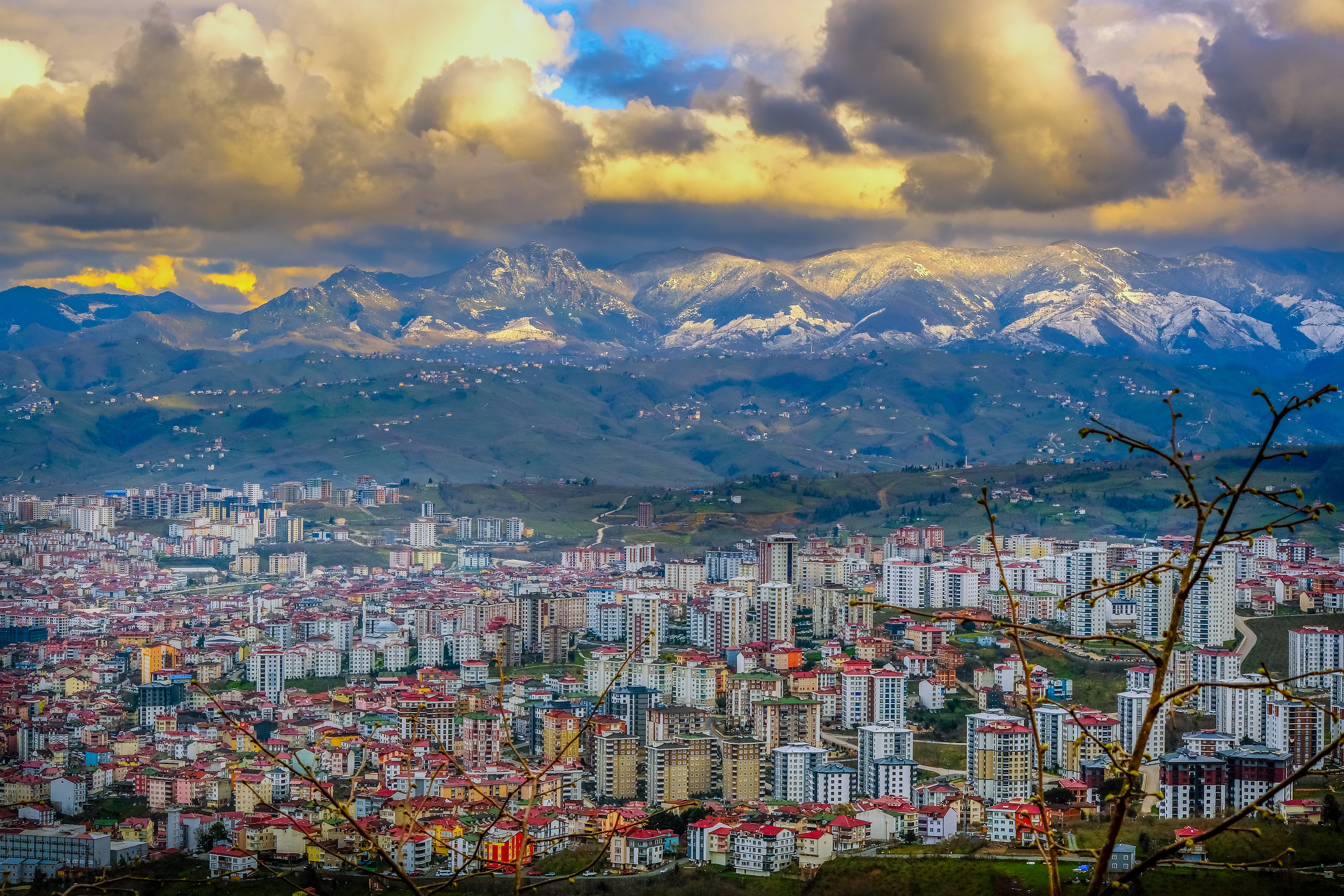
A view of Boztepe, Ordu

Ordu is one of the provinces where hazelnuts are grown the most in Turkey. Ordu is famous for hazelnuts, producing about 25 percent of the worldwide crop. The province relies on the crop for up to 80% of its economic activity. Turkey as a whole produces about 75 percent of the world's hazelnuts. As of 1920, Ordu was one of the few producers of white green beans, which were exported to Europe. Ordu also had mulberry tree plantations for sericulture. Today, the city is partially industrialized and a member of the Anatolian Tigers with its 7 companies.

== Places of interest ==
- Paşaoğlu Konağı and Ethnographic museum – an ethnographic museum.
- Taşbaşı Cultural Centre – a cultural centre
- Boztepe – a hill of 550 m (1,800 ft) overlooking the town from the west. Since June 2012, an aerial lift system provides an easy way of transportation between the city's coastline and the hilltop. The Ordu Boztepe Gondola can transport hourly 900 passengers up to the hilltop in 6.5 minutes.
- Old Houses of Ordu in the old city center
- Yalı Camii, also called Aziziye Camii – a mosque
- Atik İbrahim Paşa Camii, also called Orta Cami – a mosque built in 1770
- Eski Pazar Camii – a mosque with adjoining Turkish baths
- Efirli Camii – a mosque
- Cape Jason is an Archaeological site and a small peninsula facing the sea. Its name is derived from the Mythological leader Jason of the Argonauts.

== Sports ==
The city is the home of the Orduspor football club. Its base until 2023 was the 19 Eylül Stadium in the heart of the city. Orduspor football team has played in the Super League of Turkey several seasons. The club also has a basketball team.

== International relations ==
Ordu is twinned with:

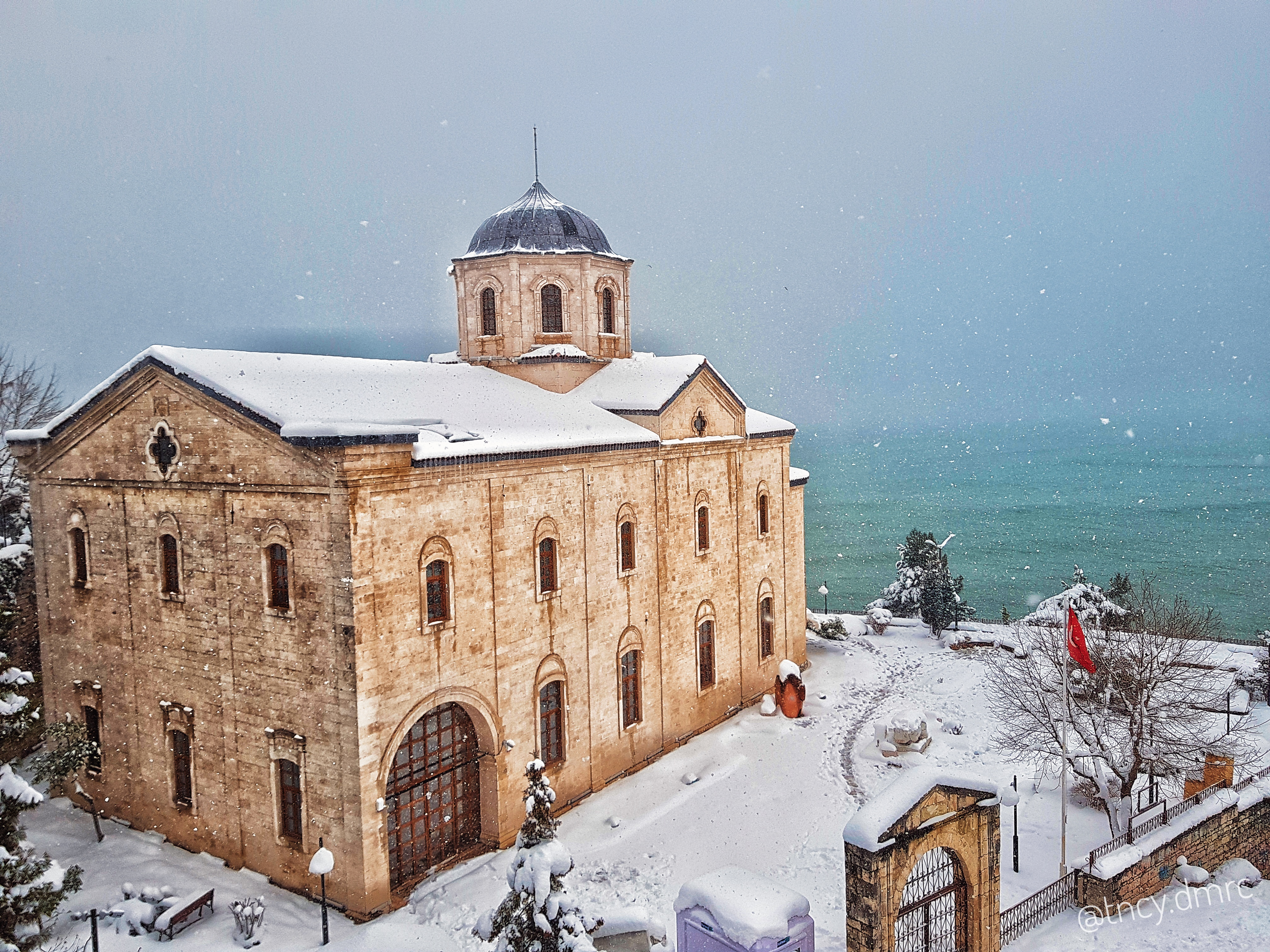
Taşbaşı Church during the winter.

- (Georgia (country)) Batumi, Georgia, since 2000
- Ganja, Azerbaijan, since 2013
- Marmaris, Turkey, since 2021
- Zugló, Hungary, since 2025

== Climate ==
Ordu has a humid subtropical climate (Köppen: Cfa, Trewartha: Cf), like most of the eastern Black Sea coast of Turkey. It experiences warm summers, cool winters, and plentiful precipitation throughout the year, which is heaviest in autumn and winter.

Snowfall is occasional between the months of December and March, snowing for a week or two, and it can be heavy once it snows.

The water temperature, like in the rest of the Black Sea coast of Turkey, is always cool and fluctuates between 8 and 20 °C (46 and 68 °F) throughout the year.

Climate data for Ordu (1991–2020, extremes 1959–present)
Month	Jan	Feb	Mar	Apr	May	Jun	Jul	Aug	Sep	Oct	Nov	Dec	Year
Record high °C (°F)	25.8 (78.4)	28.3 (82.9)	34.8 (94.6)	36.8 (98.2)	35.6 (96.1)	37.3 (99.1)	37.1 (98.8)	36.3 (97.3)	36.4 (97.5)	34.2 (93.6)	32.4 (90.3)	29.7 (85.5)	37.3 (99.1)
Mean daily maximum °C (°F)	11.2 (52.2)	11.4 (52.5)	12.8 (55.0)	15.4 (59.7)	19.8 (67.6)	24.8 (76.6)	27.7 (81.9)	28.5 (83.3)	25.2 (77.4)	21.1 (70.0)	16.7 (62.1)	13.2 (55.8)	19.0 (66.2)
Daily mean °C (°F)	7.3 (45.1)	7.2 (45.0)	8.7 (47.7)	11.5 (52.7)	16.1 (61.0)	21.0 (69.8)	23.9 (75.0)	24.5 (76.1)	21.0 (69.8)	17.0 (62.6)	12.3 (54.1)	9.1 (48.4)	15.0 (59.0)
Mean daily minimum °C (°F)	4.4 (39.9)	4.2 (39.6)	5.7 (42.3)	8.5 (47.3)	13.0 (55.4)	17.4 (63.3)	20.4 (68.7)	21.1 (70.0)	17.6 (63.7)	13.9 (57.0)	9.1 (48.4)	6.2 (43.2)	11.8 (53.2)
Record low °C (°F)	−7.2 (19.0)	−6.7 (19.9)	−4.7 (23.5)	−1.4 (29.5)	3.4 (38.1)	8.4 (47.1)	12.6 (54.7)	13.0 (55.4)	8.2 (46.8)	2.5 (36.5)	−1.5 (29.3)	−3.2 (26.2)	−7.2 (19.0)
Average precipitation mm (inches)	108.4 (4.27)	84.9 (3.34)	86.8 (3.42)	66.5 (2.62)	61.5 (2.42)	70.3 (2.77)	58.5 (2.30)	67.9 (2.67)	88.3 (3.48)	134.9 (5.31)	128.8 (5.07)	109.2 (4.30)	1,066 (41.97)
Average precipitation days	15.03	14.13	16.63	14.37	13.63	11.37	9.63	9.80	12.63	15.07	13.07	14.70	160.1
Average relative humidity (%)	66.8	67.8	70.9	73.7	74.8	71.1	70.5	70.9	71.6	73.4	69.0	66.7	70.6
Mean monthly sunshine hours	69.6	84.2	99.7	134.6	169.7	194.4	188.6	184.4	148.4	120.8	99.5	69.0	1,563
Mean daily sunshine hours	2.3	3.0	3.2	4.5	5.5	6.5	6.1	6.0	5.0	3.9	3.4	2.2	4.3
Source 1: Turkish State Meteorological Service
Source 2: NOAA (humidity, sun 1991-2020)

== Notable people from Ordu ==
- Gülşen – singer
- Ertuğrul Günay – politician who is a former Ministry of Culture and Tourism (Turkey)
- Kadir İnanır – actor
- İdris Naim Şahin - politician
- Mehmet Hilmi Güler – politician who was Ministry of Energy and Natural Resources and current mayor of the Ordu Province.
- Numan Kurtulmuş – politician
- Terzi Fikri – communist politician and old Fatsa mayor.
- Kamil Sönmez – Black Sea region at Turkish folk music artist
- Soner Arıca – musician
- Erdoğan Arıca – footballer
- Stelios Kazantzidis – singer

== Mayors of Ordu metropolitan municipality ==
- 1977-1980 and 1984-1994 Kazım Türkmen CHP, SODEP, SHP
- 1994-2004 Fikret Türkyılmaz ANAP, MHP
- 2004-2014 Seyit Torun DSP, CHP
- 2014-2018 Enver Yılmaz AK Party
- 2018-2019 Engin Tekintaş AK Party
- 2019-present Hilmi Güler AK Party

== Sport in Ordu ==
- Orduspor
- 52 Orduspor
- Orduspor 1967
