= Nejat Saydam =

Turkish film director, screenwriter, and actor

Nejat Saydam (15 September 1929 – 25 October 2000) was a Turkish film director, screenwriter and actor from Istanbul. He began as a theater actor in 1946 and became an assistant in movies four years later. In 1957, he began directing films. Saydam starred in two Turkish films and wrote 85 film scripts.
