= List of Eastern Orthodox monasteries =

This is a list of Eastern Orthodox monasteries that are individually notable.

== In Europe ==
=== Albania ===
- Ardenica Monastery
- St. George's Monastery, Sarandë

=== Austria ===
- Agia Skepi and Saint Paisios Monastery, Sankt Andrä am Zicksee, Austria

=== Belgium ===
- Monastery of the Mother of God, Diksmuide, Belgium

=== Bulgaria ===
- Aladzha Monastery
- Albotin Monastery
- Arapovo Monastery
- Bachkovo Monastery
- Basarabi Cave Complex
- Belashtitsa Monastery
- Chiprovtsi Monastery
- Dragalevtsi Monastery
- Dryanovo Monastery
- Etropole Monastery
- Glozhene Monastery
- Klisurski Monastery
- Kremikovtsi Monastery
- Lopushna Monastery
- Monastery of Saint Athanasius
- Patriarchal Monastery of the Holy Trinity
- Peshtera Monastery
- Rafail's Cross
- Razboishte Monastery
- Rila Monastery
- Rozhen Monastery
- Ruen Monastery
- Seven Altars Monastery
- Sokolski Monastery
- Transfiguration Monastery
- Troyan Monastery
- Zemen Monastery

=== United Kingdom ===
- Patriarchal Stavropegic Monastery of St. John the Baptist, Tolleshunt Knights, Essex
- Monastery of St Antony and St Cuthbert, Shrewsbury, United Kingdom
- Monastery of the Nativity of the Most Holy Mother of God and St. John Jacob of Hozeva, Stanbridge, UK
- Monastery of the Dormition of the Mother of God and All Saints of Iona, Isle of Iona, UK
- Monastery of All Celtic Saints, Kilninian, Isle of Mull, UK
- Monastery of St. Augustine of Canterbury, St. Daniel the Hermit, and St. Sophronius the Athonite, Canterbury, UK
- Monastery of the Holy Trinity, St. Davids, Wales, UK

=== Finland ===
- Lintula Holy Trinity Convent
- New Valamo

=== France ===
- Monestary of The Resurrection, Villardonnel, France
- Monastery of the Protection of the Theotokos, Bussy-en-Othe, France
- Monastery of the Dormition of the Mother of God, La Faurie, La Faurie, France
- Monastery of The Nativity of the Mother of God, Godoncourt, France.
- Monastery of The Most-Holy Mother of God, Provemont, France.
- Monestary of St Silouane Saint-Mars-de-Locquenay, France
- Monestary of Our Lady of Korsun, Grassac, France
- Monastery of the Mother of God, Marcenat, France
- Skete of the Holy Spirit, Le Mesnil-Saint-Denis, France
- Monastery of the Nativity of the Most Holy Mother of God, Saint-Georges-Buttavent, France
- Monastery of St Hilaire and St John Damascus, Uchon, France
- Monastery of St Clair and St Maurin, Lectoure, France

=== Georgia ===
- Alaverdi Monastery
- Betania Monastery
- Bodbe Monastery
- Chulevi Monastery
- David Gareja monastery complex
- Gelati Monastery
- Gudarekhi
- Ikalto
- Jvari (monastery)
- Katskhi Monastery
- Katskhi Pillar
- Kintsvisi Monastery
- Kvatakhevi
- Martvili Monastery
- Monastery of the Cross
- Parekhi
- Pitareti Monastery
- Sapara Monastery
- Shavnabada Monastery
- Shio-Mgvime monastery
- Skhalta Cathedral
- Tbeti Monastery
- Timotesubani
- Tserakvi
- Ubisi
- Urbnisi
- Vanis Kvabebi
- Vardzia
- Zarzma monastery
- Zedazeni Monastery

=== German ===
- Monastery of the Lady of Antioch, Blankenheim, Germany
- Monastery of the Holy Trinity, Bodenwerder, Bodenwerder, Germany
- Monastery of St. Job of Pochaev, Munich, Germany.
- Monastery of St Elizabeth, Buchendorf, Germany.
- Monestary of Saint Elizabeth, Gauting, Germany
- Monastery of Dormition of the Theotokos (Himmelsthür), Germany
- Skete of St. Spyridon, Geilnau, Germany
- Holy Monastery of Dionysios Trikkis & Stagon, Obernhof, Germany

=== Greek Orthodox Church of Antioch ===
- Saint Elias Monastery (Shwayya, Lebanon)
- Balamand Monastery, Lebanon
- Our Lady of Saidnaya Monastery, Syria
- Saint George's Monastery, Homs
- Convent of Saint Thecla (Maaloula)
- Our Lady of Nourieh, Lebanon

=== Cyprus ===
- Apostolos Andreas Monastery
- Chrysoroyiatissa Monastery
- Kykkos Monastery
- Machairas Monastery
- Notre Dame de Tyre
- Panagia Apsinthiotissa
- Panagia tou Sinti Monastery
- Panagidia Galaktotrofousa monastery
- Stavrovouni Monastery
- Trooditissa Monastery

=== Greece ===
- Agia Triada Monastery
- Arkadi Monastery
- Chrysoskalitissa Monastery
- Daphni Monastery
- Gouverneto Monastery
- Kaisariani Monastery
- Monastery of Komnenion
- Monastery of Saint George, Skyros
- Moni Toplou
- Nea Moni of Chios
- Preveli
- Saint Ignatios Monastery
- Monastery of Saint John the Theologian

==== Meteora ====
- Monastery of the Holy Trinity, Meteora

==== Epirus ====
- Holy Theotokos' Monastery of Molyvdoskepastos

==== Mount Athos ====
- Agiou Panteleimonos monastery known as Rossikon, houses monks from Russia
- Agiou Pavlou monastery
  - New Skete (Mount Athos)
- Dionysiou monastery
- Dochiariou monastery
- Esphigmenou Monastery
- Great Lavra (Athos)
- Hilandar
- Iviron monastery
- Karakalou monastery
- Konstamonitou monastery
- Koutloumousiou Monastery
- Osiou Gregoriou monastery
- Pantokratoros monastery
- Philotheou monastery
- Simonopetra monastery
- Stavronikita monastery
- Vatopedi monastery
- Xenophontos monastery
- Xeropotamou Monastery
- Zograf Monastery

=== Ireland ===
- Orthodox Monastery of the Life-Giving Spring, Shannonbridge, County Offaly, Ireland

=== Italy ===
- San Giovanni Theristis
- Monastery of Saint Cosmas and Damian, Montecorvino Rovella, Province of Salerno, Italy
- Monastery of San Giovanni Theristis, Bivongi, Metropolitan City of Reggio Calabria, Italy
- Monastery of Christ Pantocrator, Arona, Province of Novara, Italy

=== Netherlands and Luxembourg ===
- Monastery of the Nativity of the Theotokos, Heusden Gem Asten, Netherlands
- Monastery of Timios Prodromos, The Hague, Netherlands
- Monastery of Saint Nicholas, Hemelum, Netherlands

=== North Macedonia ===
- Church of St. George, Kurbinovo
- Church of St. George, Staro Nagoričane
- Church of St. Nicetas, Banjane
- Karpino Monastery
- Kičevo Monastery
- Lesnovo monastery
- Lešok Monastery
- Marko's Monastery
- Matejić Monastery
- Monastery of Saint Naum
- Osogovo Monastery
- Psača Monastery
- Saint Jovan Bigorski Monastery
- Treskavec Monastery
- Zrze Monastery

=== Norway ===
- Monastery of Saint Olav, Sylte, Norway
- Skete of Saint Tryphon, Hurdal Municipality, Hurdal, Norway

=== Poland ===
- Supraśl Orthodox Monastery

=== Romania ===
- Sveti Đurađ monastery
- Bazjaš monastery

=== Russia ===
==== Moscow ====
- Andronikov Monastery
- Ascension Convent
- Chrysostom Monastery
- Chudov Monastery
- Conception Convent
- Danilov Monastery
- Donskoy Monastery
- Epiphany Monastery
- Intercession Monastery (Moscow)
- Ivanovsky Convent
- Krutitsy
- Marfo-Mariinsky Convent
- Nativity Convent (Moscow)
- Nikolo-Perervinsky Monastery
- Novodevichy Convent
- Novospassky Monastery
- Preobrazhenskoye Cemetery
- Simonov Monastery
- Sretensky Monastery (Moscow)
- Vysokopetrovsky Monastery
- Zaikonospassky monastery

==== Elsewhere ====
- Alexander Nevsky Lavra, St Petersburg
- Alexander-Svirsky Monastery, Leningrad Oblast
- Andronikov Monastery
- Annunciation Monastery (Tolyatti)
- Antonievo-Siysky Monastery
- Arkazhsky Monastery
- Ascension Convent
- Belogorsky Convent
- Borisoglebsky, Yaroslavl Oblast
- Chernigovsky Skit
- Christ the Saviour Monastery
- Chrysostom Monastery
- Chudov Monastery
- Coastal Monastery of St. Sergius
- Conception Convent
- Danilov Monastery
- Donskoy Monastery
- Epiphany Monastery
- Ferapontov Monastery
- Ganina Yama
- Goritsky Monastery (Goritsy)
- Goritsky Monastery (Pereslavl-Zalessky)
- Gorne-Uspensky Convent
- Ioannovsky Convent
- Ipatiev Monastery
- Joseph-Volokolamsk Monastery
- Kamenny Monastery
- Khutyn Monastery
- Kirillo-Belozersky Monastery
- Kiy Island
- Konevsky Monastery
- Kozheozersky Monastery
- Krutitsy
- Krypetsky Monastery
- Makaryev Monastery
- Marfo-Mariinsky Convent
- Mirozhsky Monastery
- New Jerusalem Monastery
- Nikolo-Perervinsky Monastery
- Novodevichy Convent
- Novospassky Monastery
- Optina Monastery
- Pavlo-Obnorsky Monastery
- Pechenga Monastery
- Pskov-Caves Monastery
- Pühtitsa Convent
- Nativity Convent (Moscow)
- Savvino-Storozhevsky Monastery
- Serafimo-Diveyevsky Monastery
- Shamordino Convent
- Simonov Monastery
- Smolny Convent
- Solovetsky Monastery
- Spaso-Prilutsky Monastery
- Sretensky Monastery (Moscow)
- Stolobny Island
- Svensky Monastery
- Theophany Convent, Kostroma
- Tikhvin Assumption Monastery
- Transfiguration Monastery, Staraya Russa
- Trinity Lavra of St. Sergius
- Troitse-Gledensky Monastery
- Ugresha Monastery
- Valaam Monastery
- Valday Iversky Monastery
- Vyazhishchsky Monastery
- Vysokopetrovsky Monastery
- Vysotsky Monastery
- Yelizarov Convent
- Zaikonospassky monastery

=== Spain and Portugal ===
- Monastery of the Dormition of the Most Holy Mother of God, Pedrogão, Portugal
- Monastery of Saint Paraskevi, Vilaller, Spain

=== Sweden ===
- Monestary of St. George, Olofström, Sweden

=== Switzerland ===
- Monastery of Protection-of-the-Mother-of-God, Haut-Intyamon, Switzerland
- Monastery of the Holy Trinity, Dompierre, Switzerland

=== Ukraine ===
- Bakota, Ukraine
- Brotherhood Monastery
- Florivsky Convent
- Kiev Pechersk Lavra
- Manyava Skete
- Mezhyhirya Monastery
- Mhar Monastery
- Pochayiv Lavra
- St. Michael's Golden-Domed Monastery
- Sviatohirsk Lavra
- Trakhtemyrov Monastery
- Trinity Monastery (Chernihiv)
- Trinity Monastery of St. Jonas
- Vydubychi Monastery
- Zymne Monastery

== In the Americas ==
=== Argentina ===
- Episcopal headquarters of the Serbian Orthodox Eparchy of Buenos Aires and South America

=== Canada ===
- All Saints Monastery
- Holy Transfiguration Serbian Orthodox Monastery, in Milton, Ontario
- Saint Petka Serbian Orthodox Church

=== United States ===
- St. Archangel Michael Skete
- Saint Herman of Alaska Monastery
- Holy Cross Orthodox Monastery (Castro Valley, California)
- Holy Trinity Monastery (Jordanville), Jordanville, New York, NRHP-listed
- St. Mark Serbian Orthodox Monastery
- New Gračanica Monastery
- New Skete (New York)
- St. Nilus Island Skete
- St. Pachomious Monastery
- Monastery of St. Paisius, Safford, Arizona
- Saint Sava Serbian Orthodox Monastery and Seminary, Illinois
- Episcopal headquarters of the Serbian Orthodox Eparchy of Western America, located at Saint Steven's Serbian Orthodox Cathedral, Alhambra, California
- St. Xenia Serbian Orthodox Skete

== In Asia ==
=== Holy Land ===
- Abraham's Oak Holy Trinity Monastery, Hebron, Palestine
- Mar Elias Monastery
- Mar Saba
- Monastery of the Temptation
- Our Lady of Nourieh
- Saint Catherine's Monastery

=== Turkey ===
- Bolaman Castle
- Cape Jason
- Kuştul Monastery
- Monastery of the Panagia Hodegetria
- Panagia Theoskepastos Monastery
- Monastery of Stoudios, or the Monastery of Saint John the Forerunner at Stoudios (ruins)
- Sümela Monastery
- Vazelon Monastery
- Zelve Monastery (ruins, part of museum) near Ürgüp and Avanos

== See also ==
- List of Serbian Orthodox monasteries
- Lavra, a type of monastery consisting of a cluster of cells or caves for hermits
- Metochion, an ecclesiastical embassy church within the Eastern Orthodox tradition
- Stauropegion, a monastery or parish not under the jurisdiction of the local bishop, but directly under the primate or Holy Synod of a particular Church. Also called stauropegic, stavropegion
