= St. George's Monastery =

St. George's Monastery may refer to:

- Monastery of Saint George of Choziba, Wadi Qelt, Palestine
- Monastery of Saint George, Skyros, Greece
- Saint George's Monastery, Homs, Syria
- St. George's Monastery, Al-Khader, Palestine
- St. George's Monastery, Novgorod, or Yuriev Monastery, Russia
- St. George's Monastery, Sarandë, Albania
- Saint George Kyparissiotes Monastery, Turkey
