= Genetes =

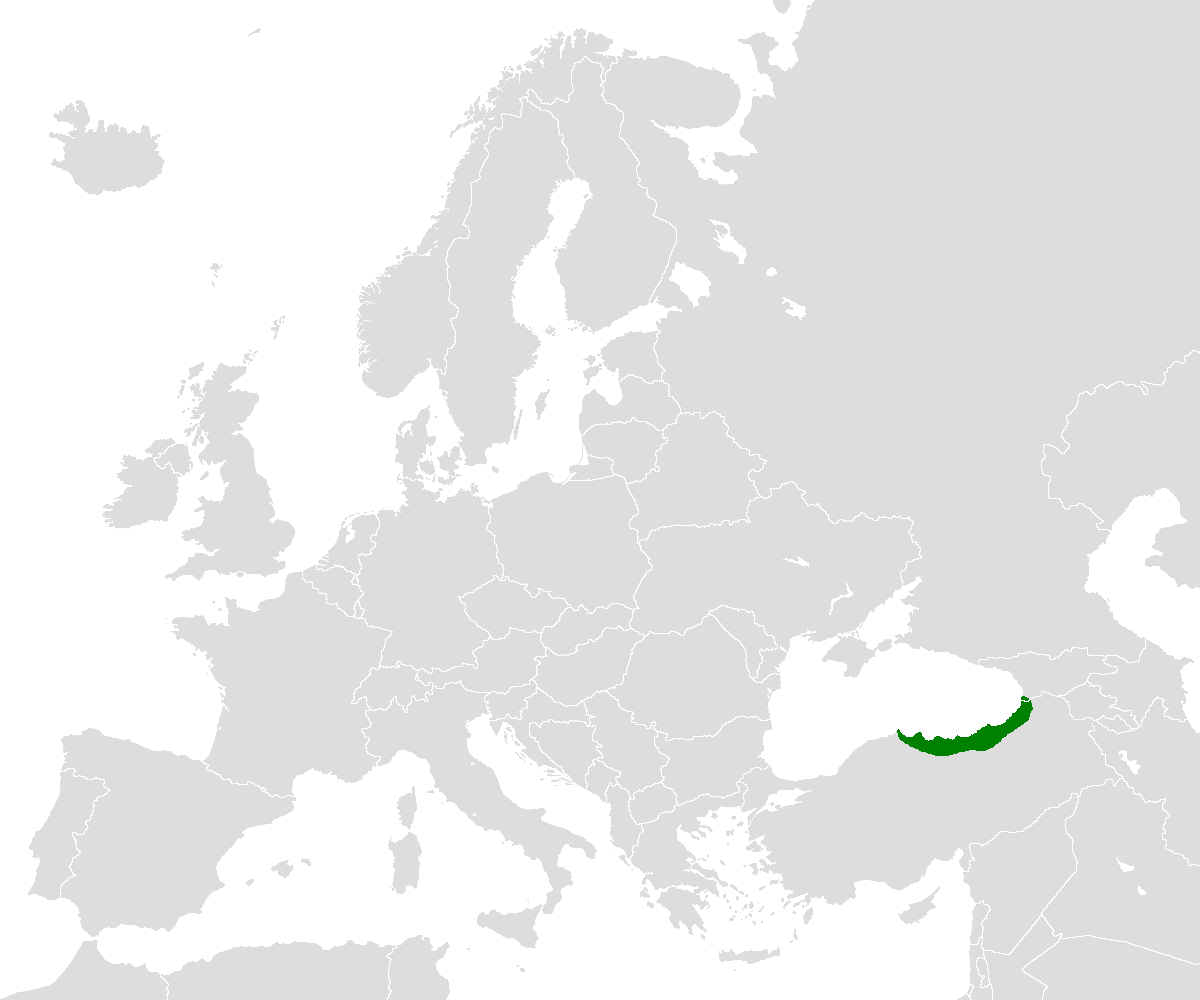
Location of Pontus

Genetes (Ancient Greek: Γενήτης) was a harbour town on the Black Sea coast of ancient Pontus near Cotyora. The Periplus of Pseudo-Scylax calls it Genesintis (Γενέσιντις). There were a river and promontory of the same name.

The Genetes River is identified with the modern Çaka Deresi and the promontory with Çam Burnu, both in Asiatic Turkey, but the townsite is treated as unlocated, but likely northwest of Cotyora and just south of modern Perşembe.
