= Boon (Pontus) =

Town in ancient Pontus

Coordinates: 41°03′25″N 37°46′36″E

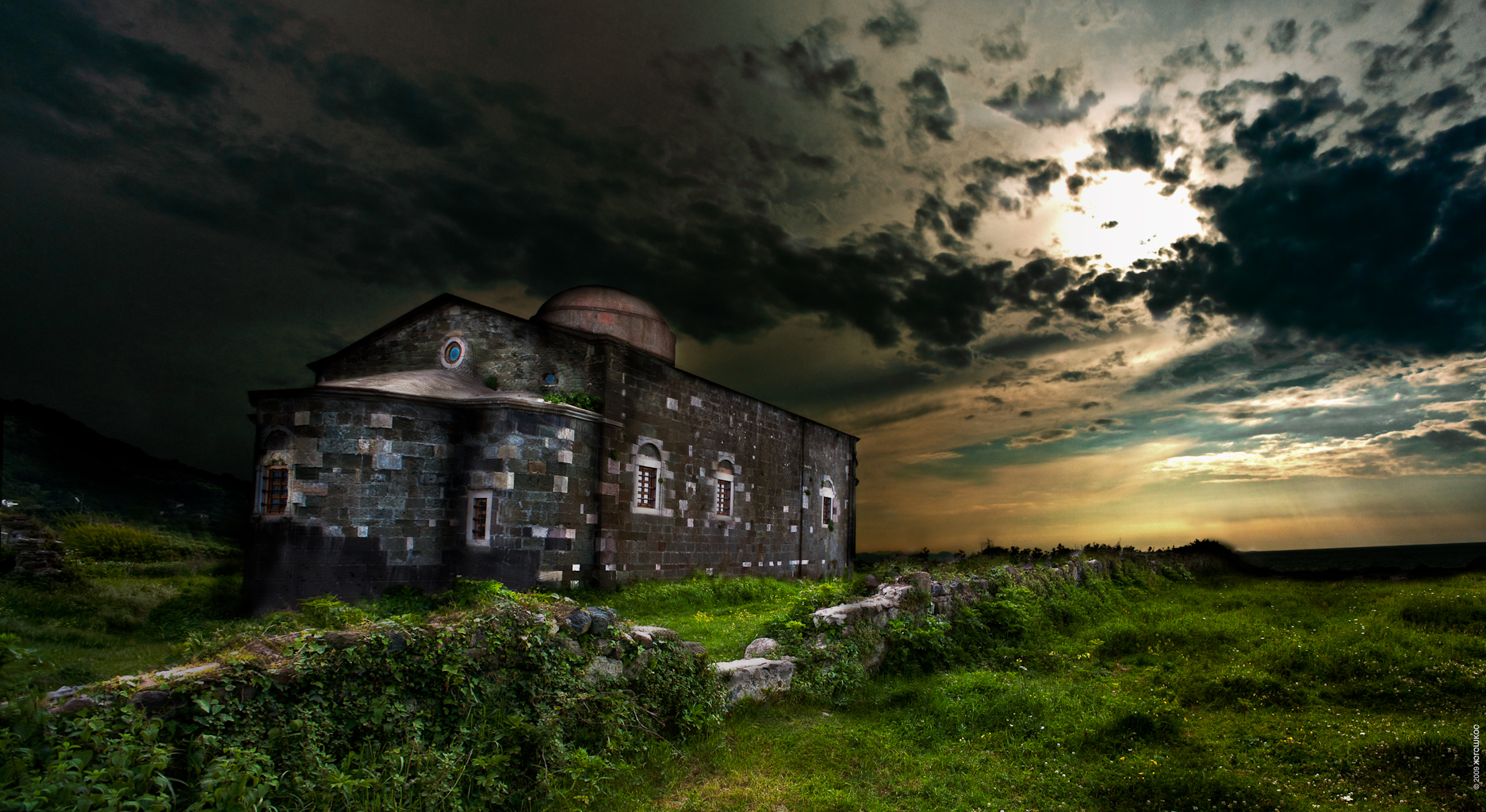
landscape of Persembe County

Boon (Ancient Greek: Βοών) was a port on the Black Sea coast of ancient Pontus, 90 stadia east of Cape Jasonium.

According to William Hamilton, the 19th-century geologist, it was "the best winter harbor on that side of Constantinople, surpassing even Sinope due to its great depth".

Its site is located near Perşembe in Asiatic Turkey.
