= Zlatoustovsky =

Zlatoustovsky (masculine), Zlatoustovskaya (feminine), or Zlatoustovskoye (neuter) may refer to:

- Zlatoustovsky Urban Okrug, a municipal formation, which the city of Zlatoust, Chelyabinsk Oblast, Russia, is incorporated as
- Chrysostom Monastery (Zlatoustovsky Monastery), a monastery in Moscow, Russia
