= Jasonia (Pontus) =

Jasonia or Iasonia (Ancient Greek: Ἰασονία), also Iasonia Akropolis (Ancient Greek: Ἰασονία ἀκρόπολις), was a Greek Acropolis on the Black Sea coast of ancient Pontus. It was located on Cape Jasonium.

The exact site of the place is unlocated. Pliny the Elder also talks about a river called Jason located near another river called Melantio, between the cities of Ambiso and Farnacia.
