= Belashtitsa Monastery =

Monastery in Bulgaria

Coordinates: 42°3′17″N 24°44′29″E

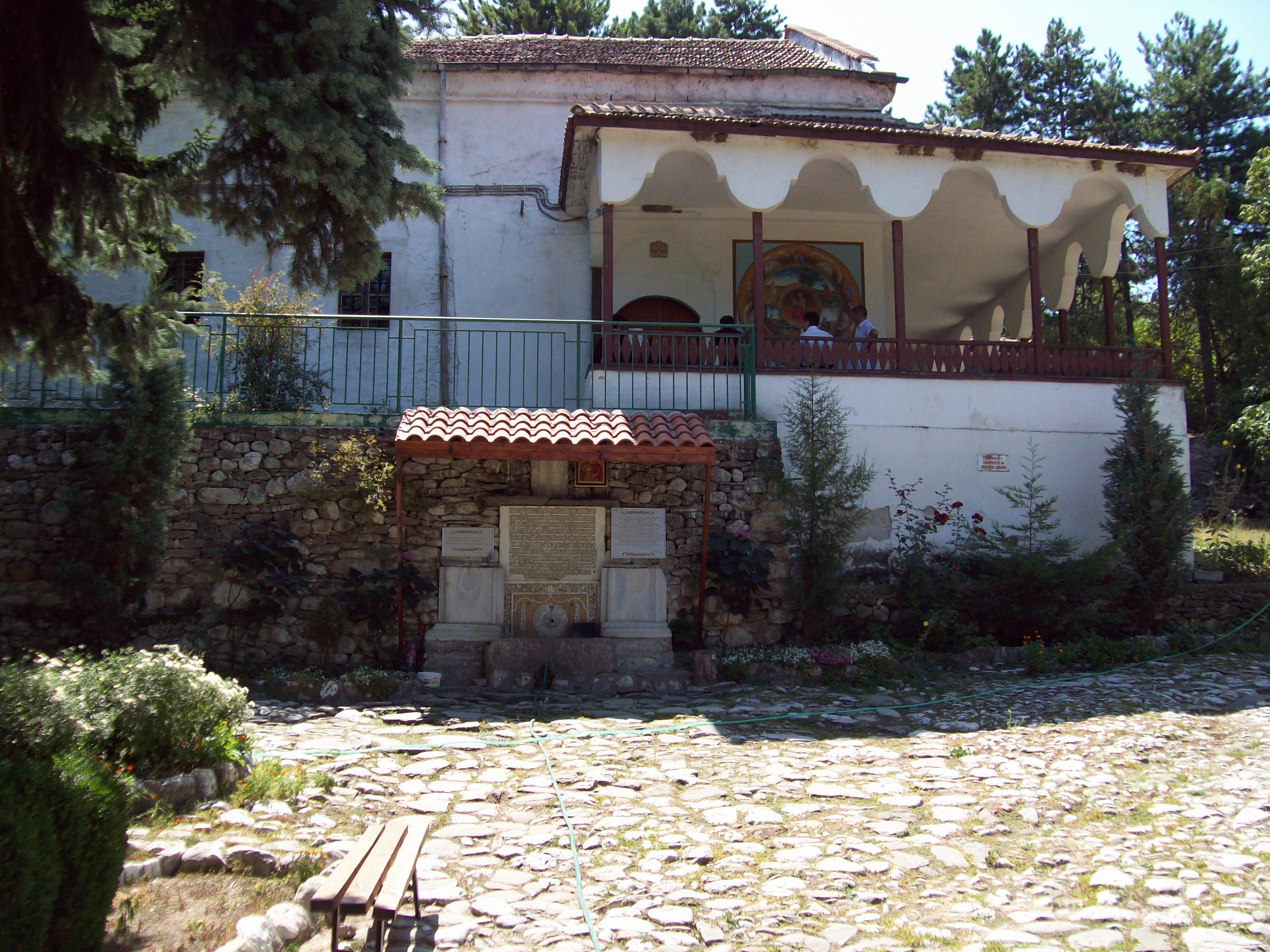
Belashtitsa Monastery, Bulgaria

The Belashtitsa Monastery (Bulgarian: Белащински манастир) is a convent in the western Rhodope Mountains near the village of Belashtitsa at 12 km to the south of Plovdiv. It is dedicated to St George the Victorious.

The monastery has been declared a monument of culture and consists of a church, chapel, dwellings and farm buildings. The church is one nave, one apse edifice with inner and outer narthex without a dome and frescoes. It was constructed in 1838. There is a holy spring at the outer narthex. There is a stone fountain in the yard which was built in 1831.

The monastery was established in 1020 by the Byzantine commander Nikephoros Xiphias who became governor of Plovdiv in 1018. Xiphias had important contributions for the Byzantine victory in the battle of Kleidion in 1014 which determined the fall of the First Bulgarian Empire four years later. His regiments crossed the Belasitsa mountain and attacked the Bulgarian troops of Emperor Samuil in the rare. According to the legent, the Byzantine Emperor Basil II gave to Xiphias some of the captured Bulgarians who built the village of Belasitsa near the monastery which was later renamed to Brestovitsa. The monastery was dedicated to Saint George.

It was destroyed by the Ottomans in 1364 in the course of the Bulgarian-Ottoman Wars and was rebuilt in the 18th century. It was burned by the Turks in 1878 during the end of the Russo-Turkish War (1877-1878) when the defense lines of the retreating Ottomans passed through the line Kuklen-Brestnik-Brestovitsa. After the Liberation of Bulgaria the convent was rebuilt once again but remained under the jurisdiction of the Patriarchate of Constantinople until 1906.

In the vicinity of the monastery there is a locality with plane trees and an Ottoman watch tower.
