= Razboishte Monastery =

Razboishte Monastery Разбоищки Манастир (in Bulgarian)
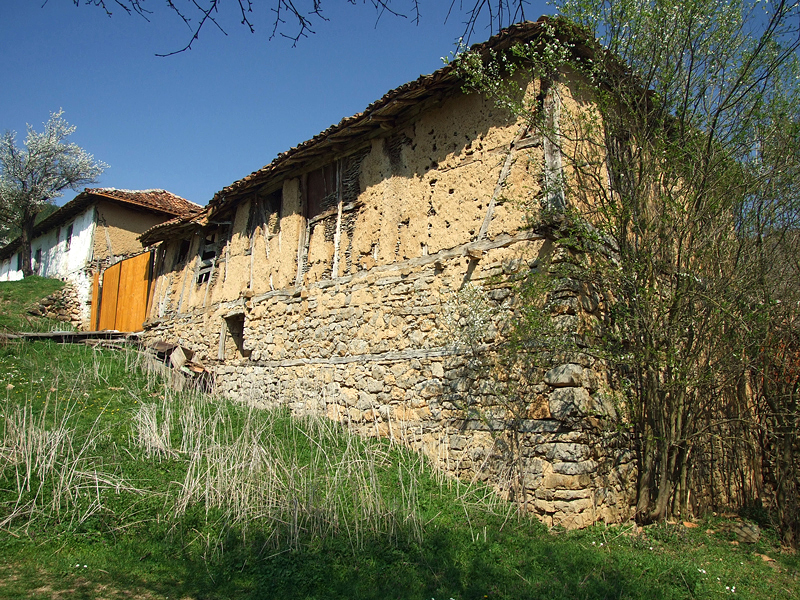
- Interactive map of Razboishte Monastery; Разбоищки Манастир (in Bulgarian)

Monastery information
- Order: Bulgarian Orthodox Church

Site
- Location: Razboishte, Godech, Bulgaria
- Coordinates: 43°0′58″N 22°56′26″E
- Public access: yes

Razboishte Monastery (Bulgarian: Разбоищки Манастир) is a semi-functioning Bulgarian Orthodox monastery.

== Location ==
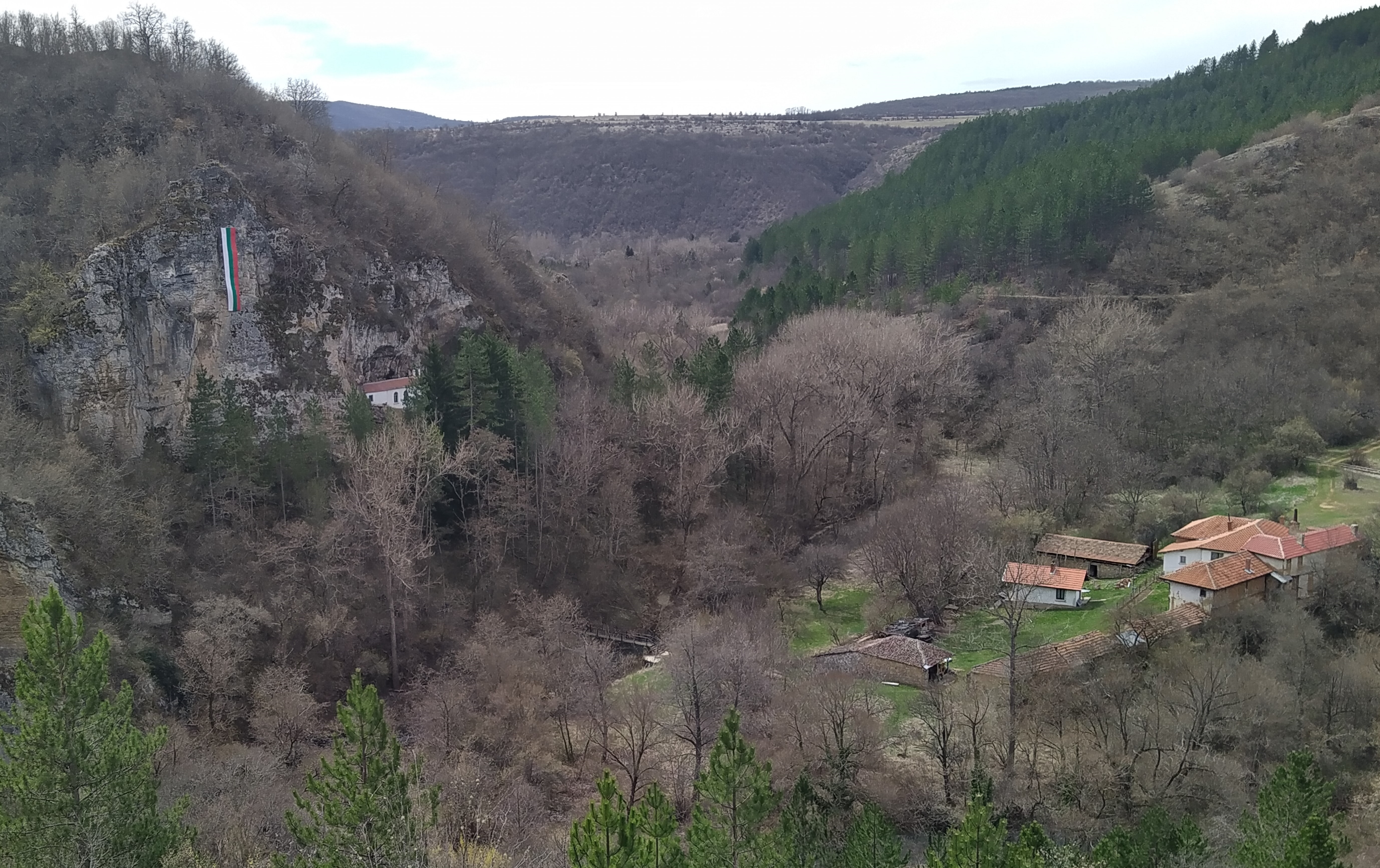
The Monastery in 2022

Razboishte Monastery
- Location within Bulgaria
- Coordinates: 43°0′58″N 22°56′26″E
- Country: Bulgaria
- Provinces (Oblast): Sofia

The monastery is in the Nishava river gorge in the most western part of Bulgaria. It is situated close to the Razboishte village, Sofia Province, at about 10 km (6 mi) to the west of the town of Godech.

The village can be reached by car through the roads from the towns of Dragoman or Godech, but the monastery buildings are accessible by car only by a dirt road, when the land is dry, from Kalotina and Cheparlintsi village. Most visitors prefer to walk about a kilometer from the village of Razboishte.

== History ==
The oldest piece of information about Razboishte Monastery dates as far back as the 4th century A.D. The rock caves around were populated by monks-hermits during the Middle Ages. The caves were also used as a shelter by St. Sava. According to legend, the Long Lent find the Saint here in the course of his journey to Jerusalem so he stayed for 40 days.

During the 18th century the monastery itself came into existence. A small single-nave church was built outside the walls into the nearby rocks just above the Nishava river. The cook-house was added in 1861.

It is known that the buildings were set on fire three times by Ottoman conquerors. The Bulgarian revolutionary Vasil Levski stayed at the monastery several times.

== Nowadays ==
In the beginning of 20th century Razboishte Monastery became desolated until 1947 when three nuns settled here. They found the buildings in decay and the priceless frescoes in the old church almost completely destroyed. In the course of time the nuns, with the help from the local people, succeeded in restoring the Monastery and reconstructing the church. The new chancel-screen is from 1950, but the remnants from the old one are kept in the monastery. There are some old frescoes preserved on the west facade of the initial church.

The last of the nuns died in 2007.

== Gallery ==
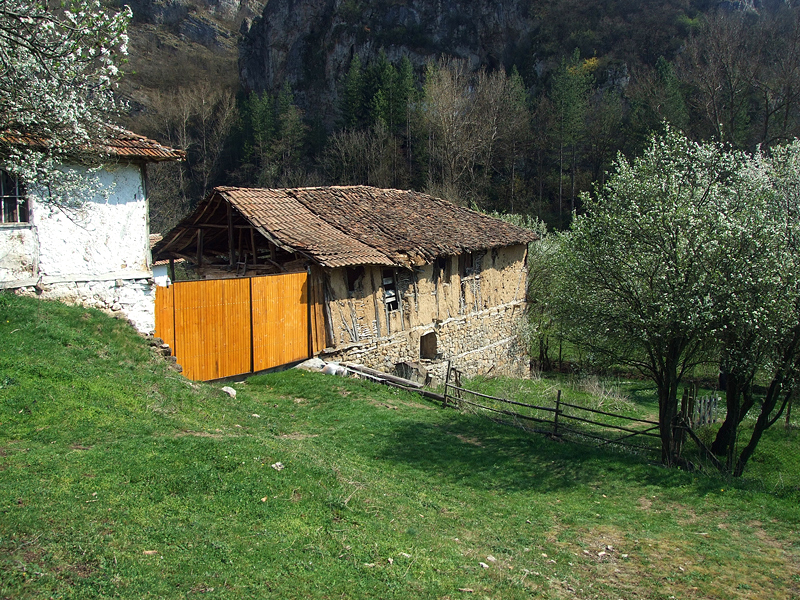

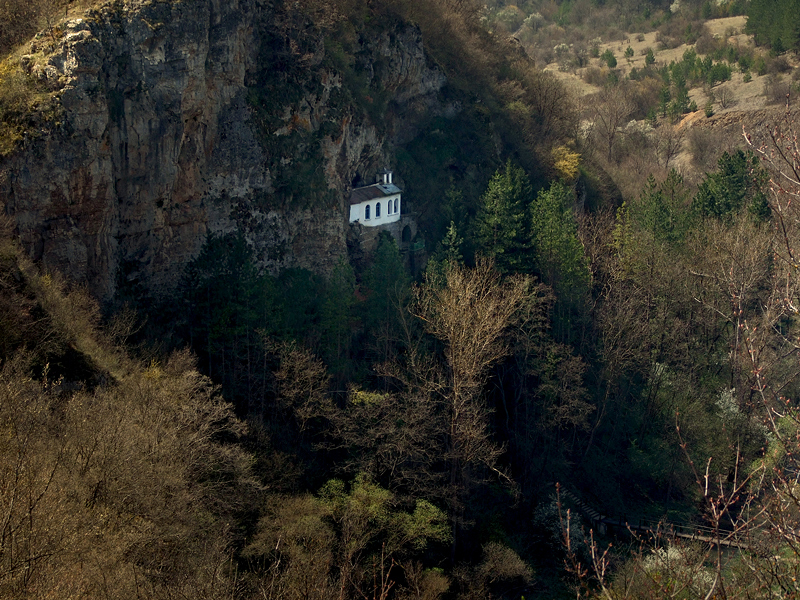

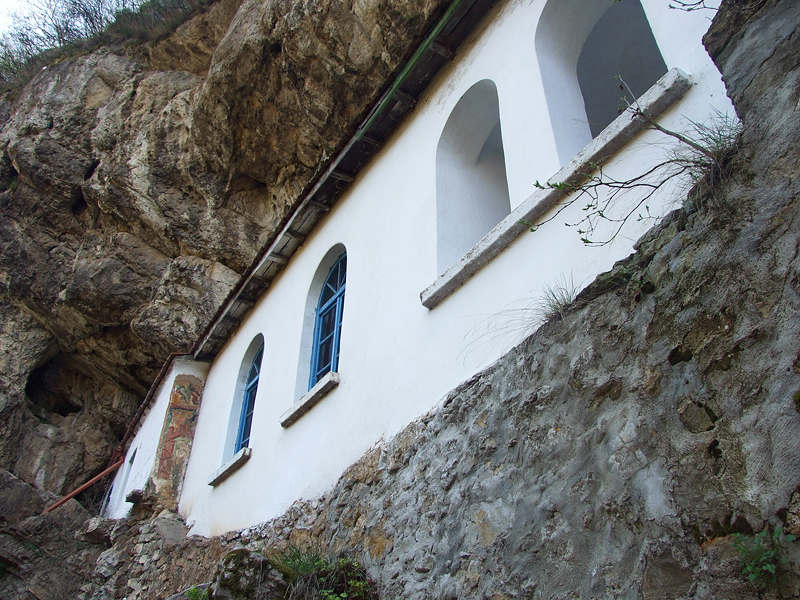

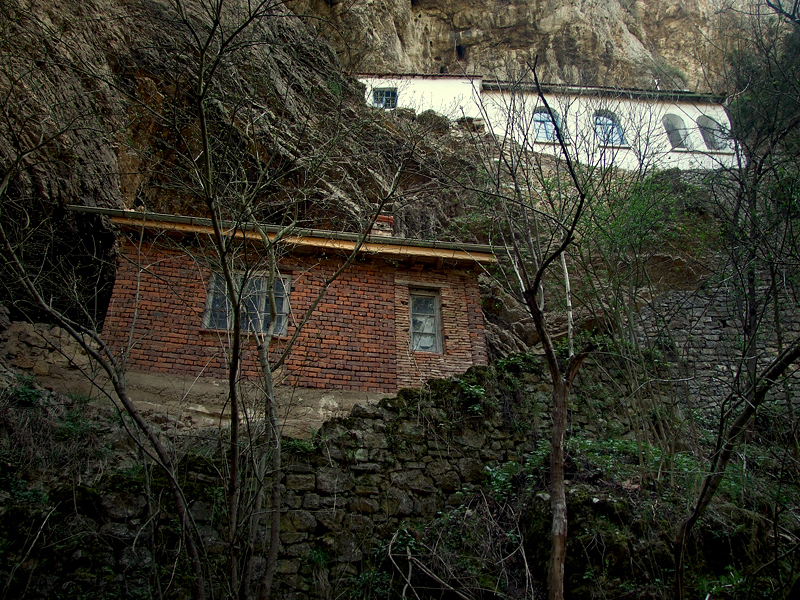

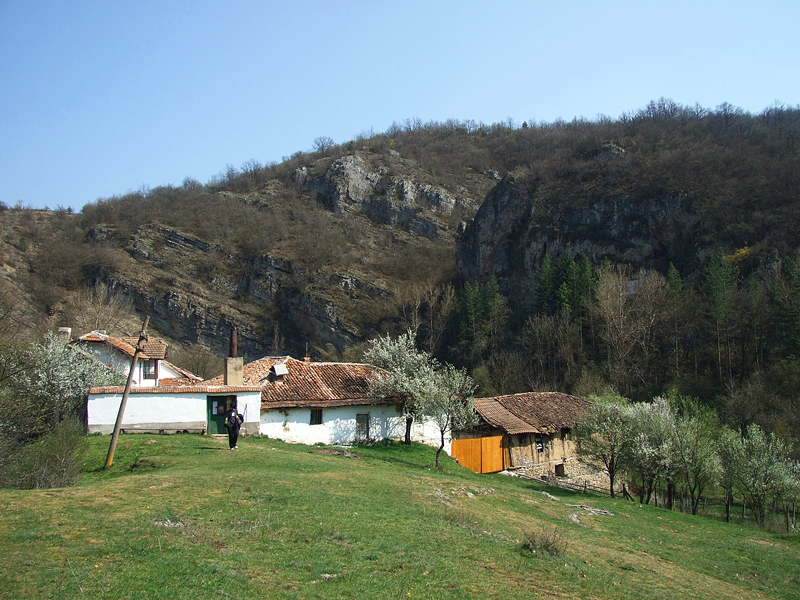

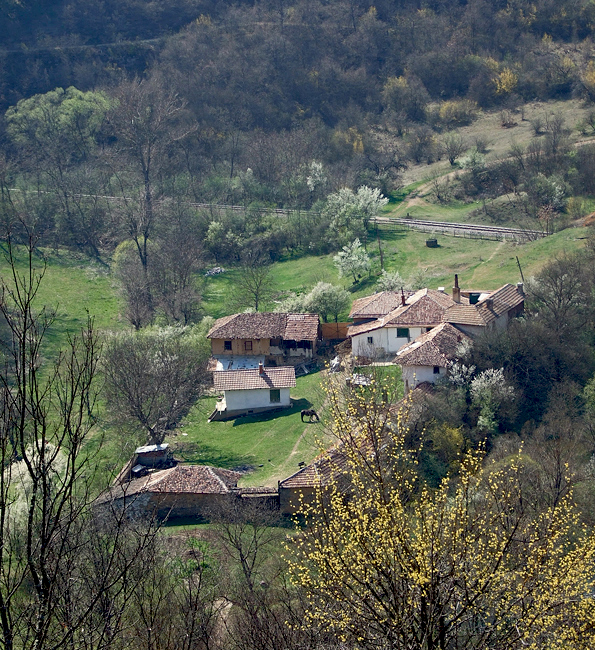
