= Panagia tou Sinti Monastery =

Orthodox monastery in Cyprus

Panagia tou Sinti
- Παναγία του Σίντη
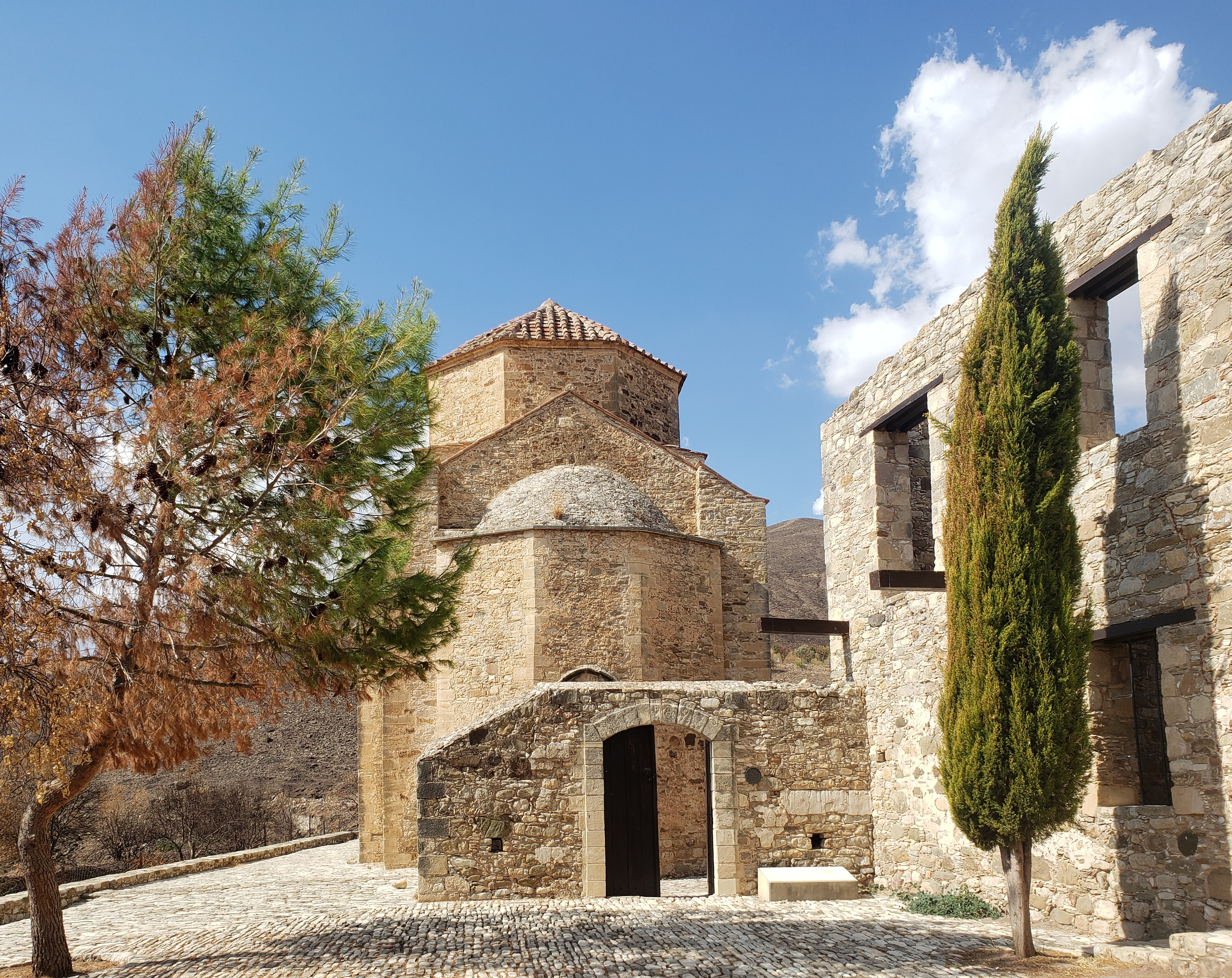

- Location within Cyprus
- Interactive map of Panagia tou Sinti

Monastery information
- Established: 16th century
- Dedication: Virgin Mary
- Celebration: August 15
- Diocese: Paphos Bishopric; Church of Cyprus

People
- Founder: unknown

Architecture
- Functional status: active

Site
- Location: Troodos, Cyprus
- Coordinates: 34.8365°N 32.6390°E

Panagia tou Sinti Monastery (Greek: Παναγία του Σίντη) is an orthodox monastery near the village of Kelokedara in the Paphos district of Cyprus. It is dedicated to the Virgin Mary.

It was founded in the 16th century. In 1997, it received a Europa Nostra award for its restoration and conservation.
