= Nikolo-Perervinsky Monastery =

Historical monastery of Moscow

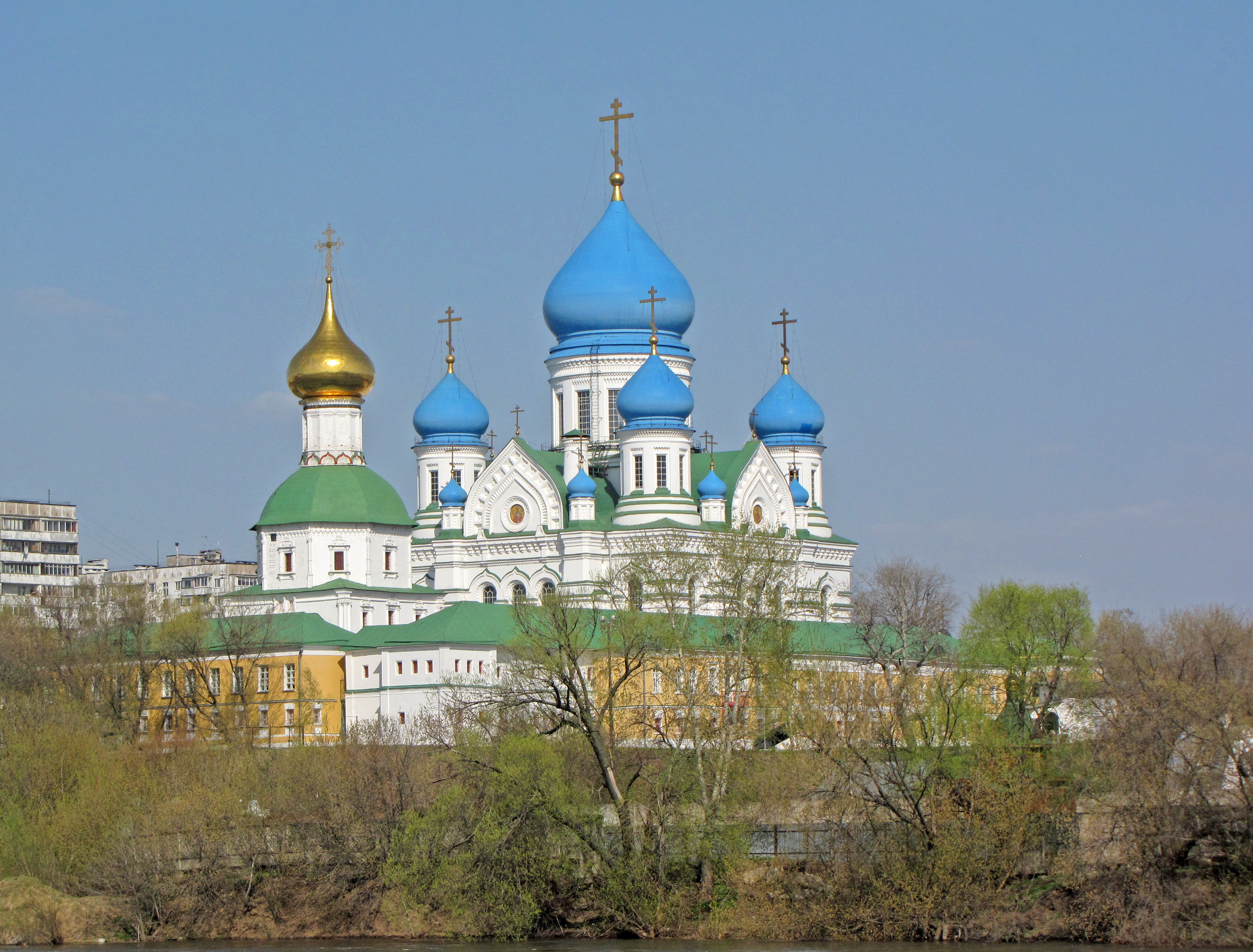
- Interactive map of Nikolo-Perervinsky Monastery

Monastery information
- Order: Orthodox
- Established: 1623
- Disestablished: 1928
- Diocese: Moscow

Site
- Location: Moscow, Russia
- Coordinates: 55°40′09″N 37°43′07″E

Nikolo-Perervinsky Monastery (Николо-Перервинский монастырь in Russian) is the southernmost historical monastery of Moscow. It is dedicated to Saint Nicholas the Miracle-Worker. It is situated at south of the district of Pechatniki between the Moscow river and the Lublino railroad classification yard.

The abbey was first mentioned in the city records in 1623, although it is believed that it had existed for more than a century prior to that. Its name (from the Russian verb "to interrupt") is explained by the fact that the Moskva River has repeatedly changed its flow at this place. The abbey began to expand in the mid-17th century and grew especially large at the turn of the century, when Patriarch Adrian made the cloister his summer residence and built the so-called Old Katholikon (1696–1700). In 1775, they opened a theological seminary on the premises of the monastery. Its main sources of income were Sukharev Tower, Iverskaya Chapel and other sketes, attached to it by the ecclesiastic authorities.

In 1908, the vast New Katholikon was consecrated to the Holy Icon Our Lady of Iberia. The abbey was closed down in 1928. The Russian Orthodox Church resumed divine service in the Old Katholikon in 1991.

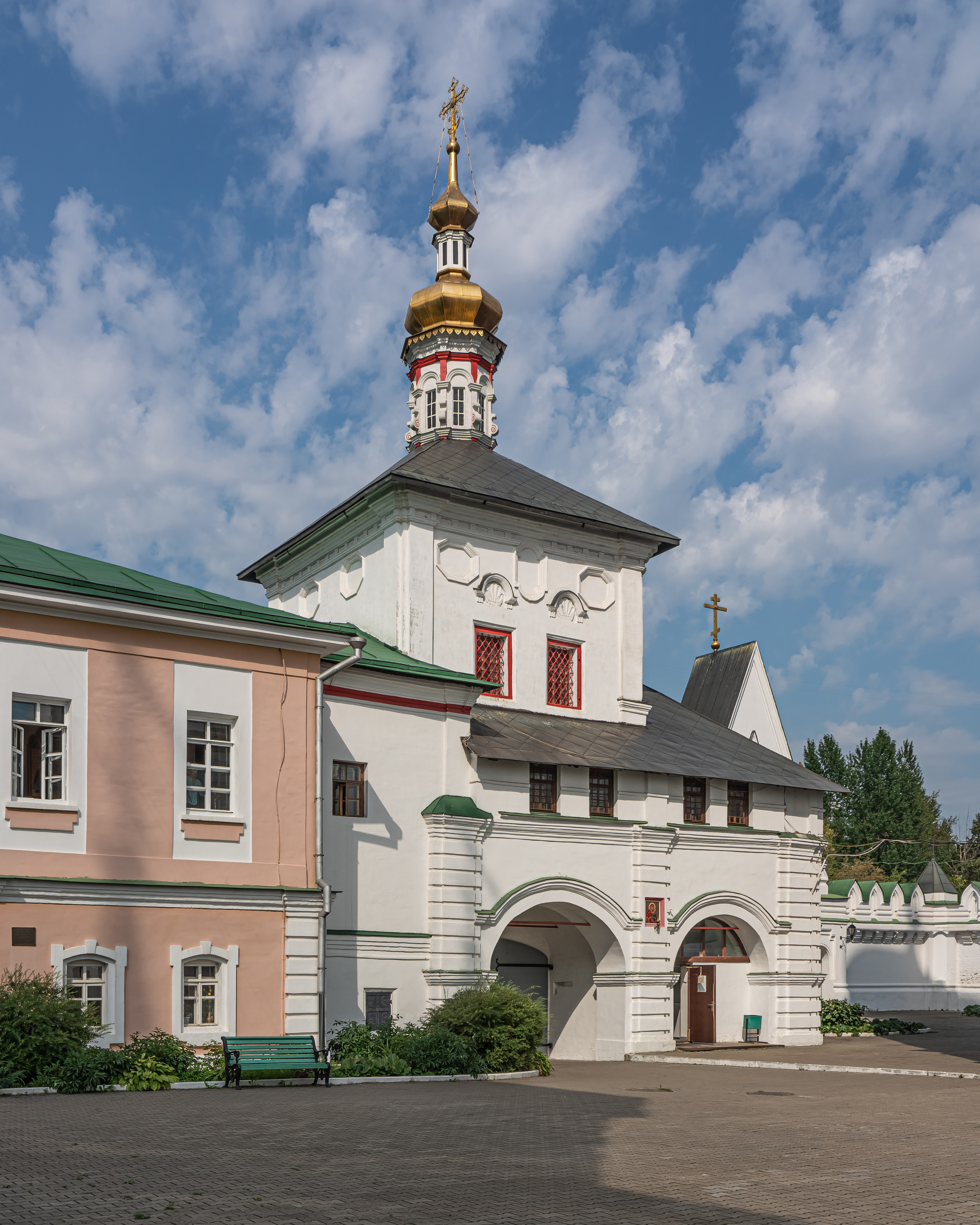
Gate church

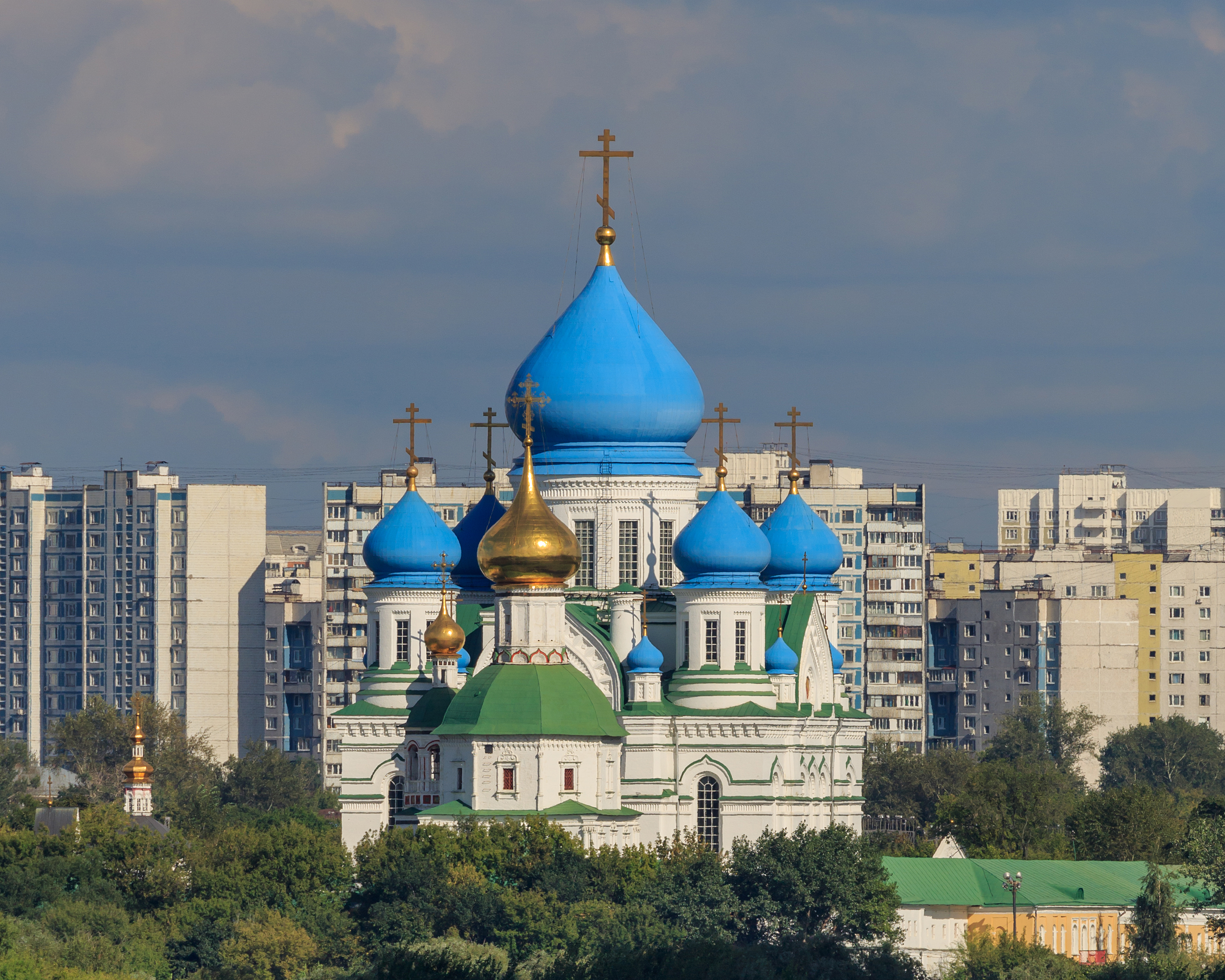
Remote view of the monastery

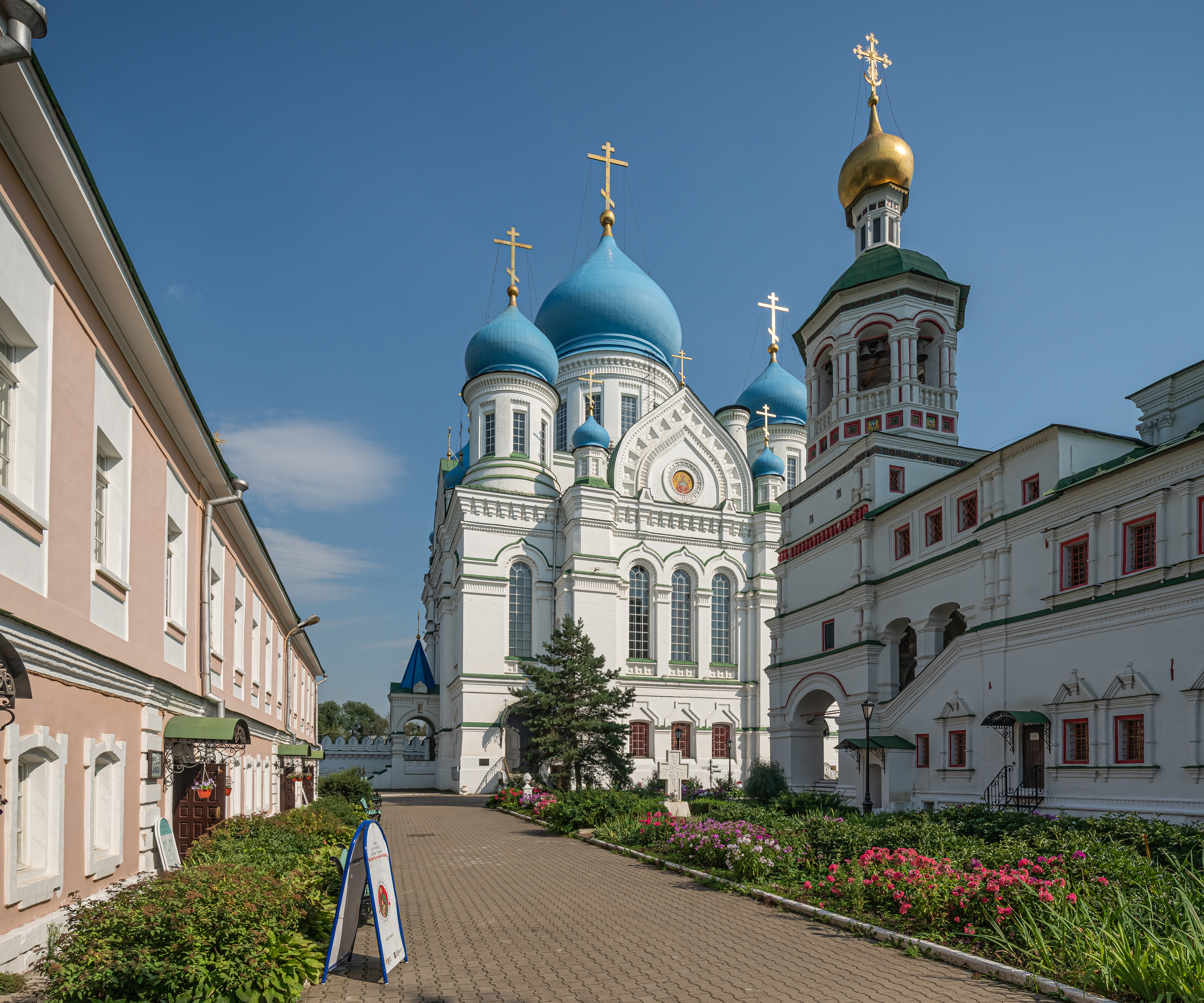
The New and the Old Katholikon

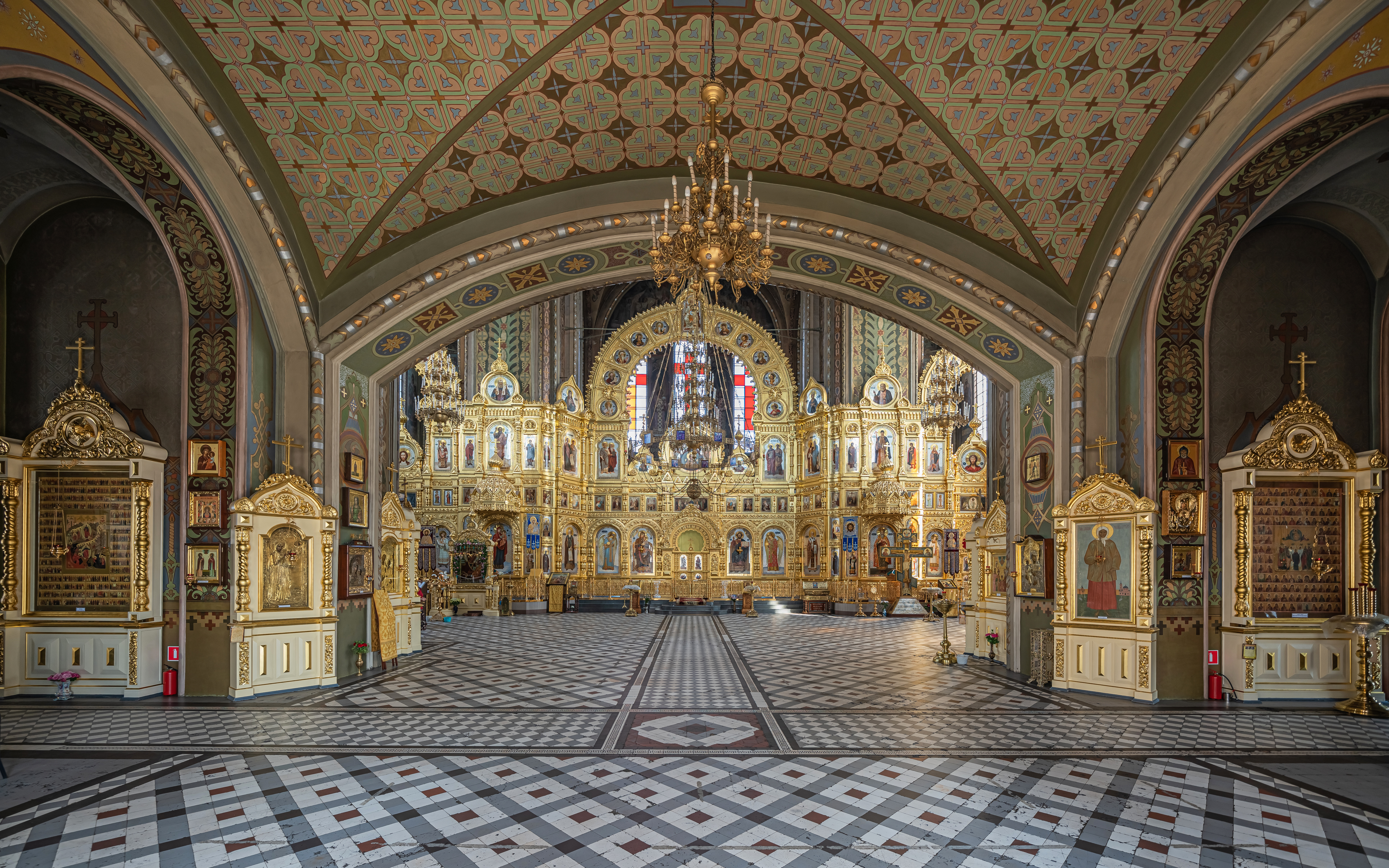
Interior of the New Katholikon

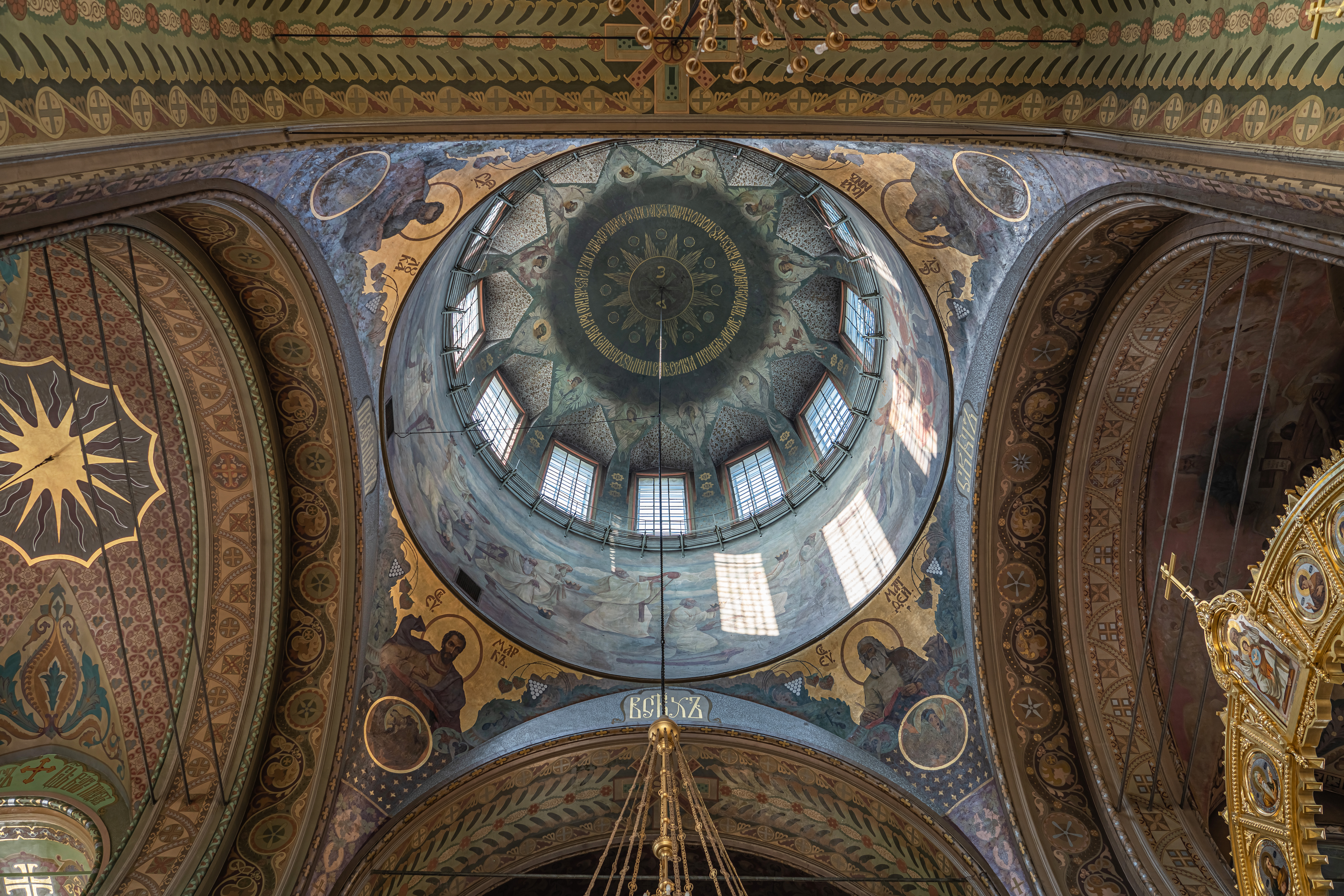
Dome interior of the New Katholikon
