= Chrysoskalitissa Monastery =

Greek Orthodox monastery in Crete

- Μονή Χρυσοσκαλιτίσσης
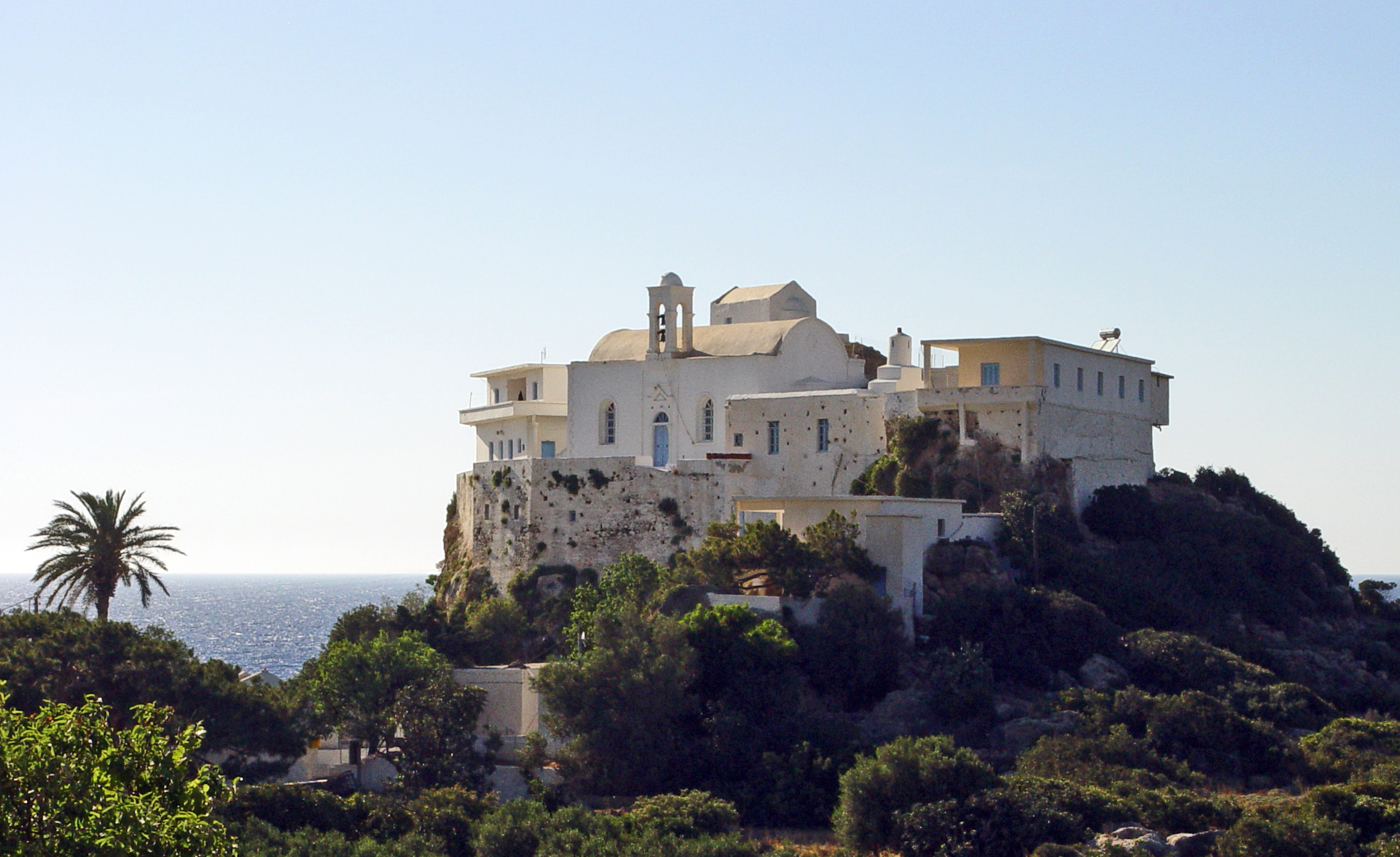

- Location of the monastery in Crete
- Interactive map of Chrysoskalitissa Monastery

Monastery information
- Order: Ecumenical Patriarchate of Constantinople
- Denomination: Greek Orthodox
- Dedication: Holy Trinity; Dormition
- Archdiocese: Church of Crete

Architecture
- Status: Monastery
- Functional status: Active
- Completion date: 17th century

Site
- Location: Kissamos, Innachori, Crete
- Country: Greece
- Coordinates: 35°18′41″N 23°32′00″E

The Chrysoskalitissa Monastery (Greek: Μονή Χρυσοσκαλιτίσσης) is a 17th-century Greek Orthodox monastery located on the southwest coast of the island of Crete, Greece. Within the municipal district of Innachori of the municipality of Kissamos, the monastery lies about 72 kilometres (45 mi) southwest of Chania. Built up on rocks 35 metres (115 ft) above sea level, it overlooks the Libyan Sea.

== Features ==
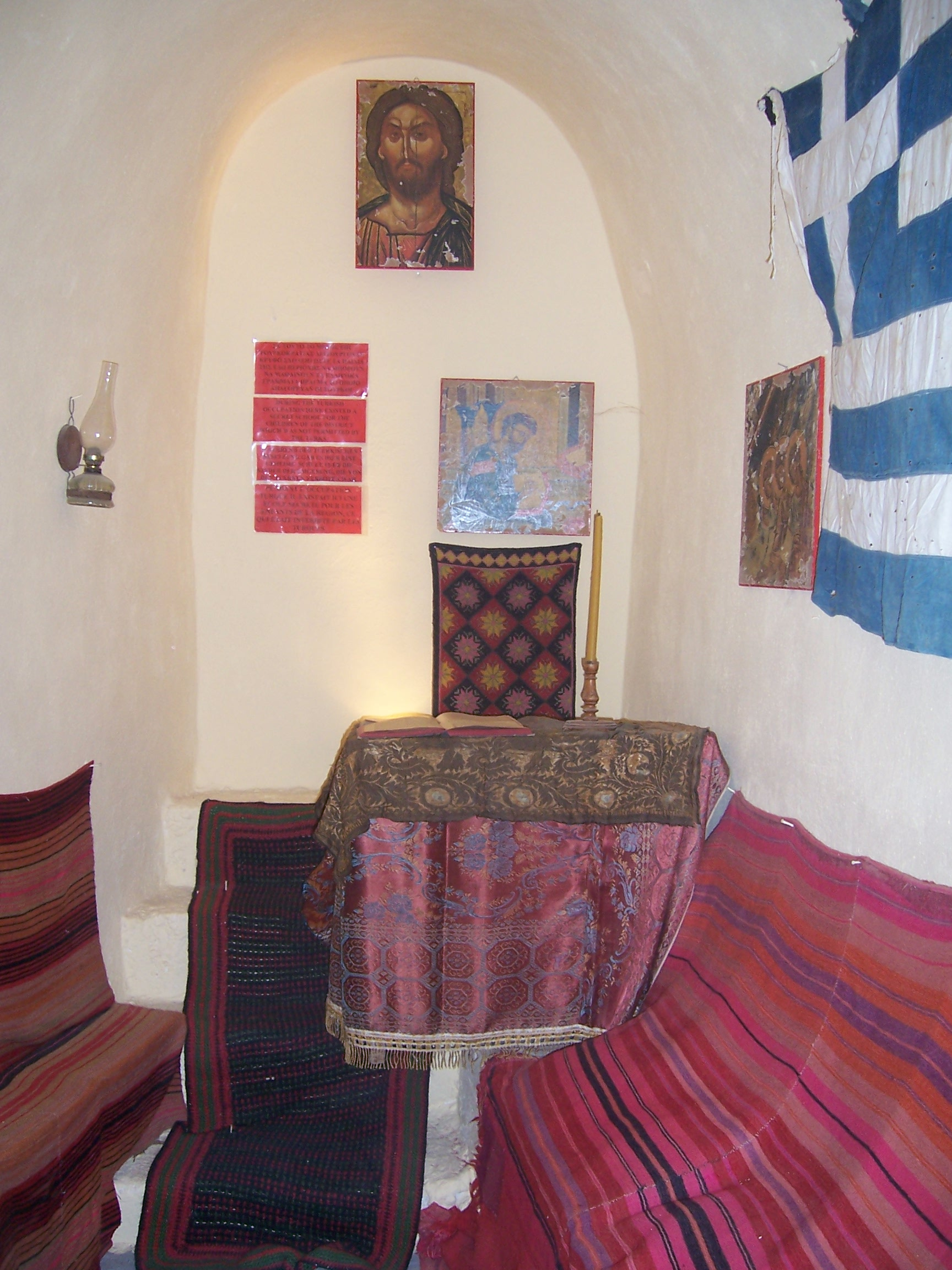
Inner school

== History ==
The coastal area close to the monastery promontory has several small coves that in earlier times offered welcome landing points for sailors coming to Crete from the west. There archeologists have found interesting remains of late Neolithic and Early Minoan settlements.

According to local tradition, the name of the monastery is derived from one of the ninety steps leading up to the main building. This step is said to be golden (χρυσός - chrysos in Greek) and visible only to devout Christians.

The monastery is dedicated to the Holy Trinity (Greek: Aγία Τριάδα, romanized: Agia Triada) and the Dormition of Virgin Mary (Greek: Κοίμησης της Θεοτόκου, romanized: Koimisis tis Theotokou).

== See also ==
- Church of Crete
- List of Greek Orthodox monasteries in Greece
