= Shavnabada Monastery =

Georgian Orthodox monastery in Georgia

Shavnabada Monastery შავნაბადა
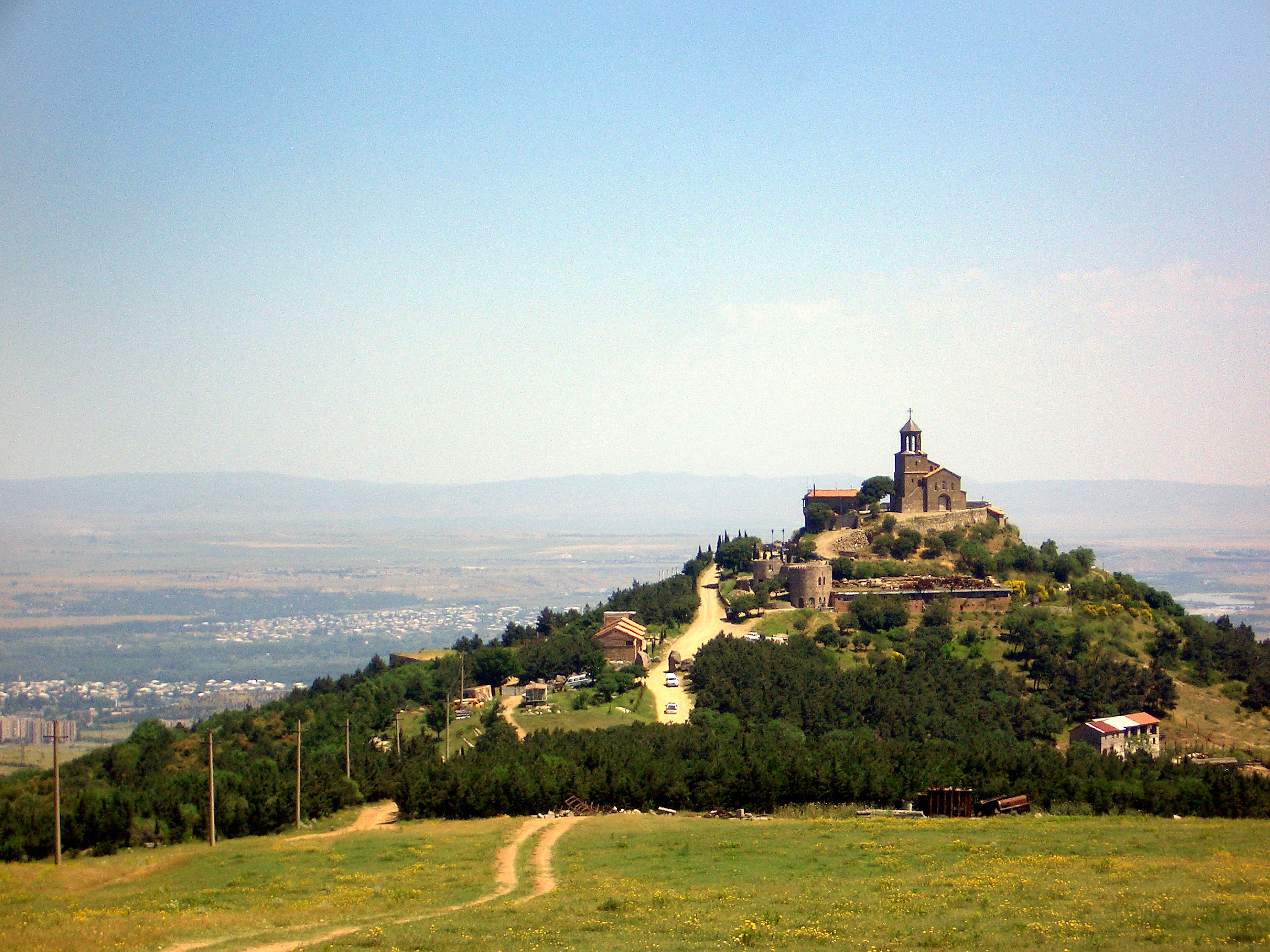
- The mountaintop monastic complex of Shavnabada.

- Location within Georgia

Religion
- Affiliation: Georgian Orthodox Church
- Region: Caucasus
- Status: Active

Location
- Location: On Shavnabada Mountain, 30 km away from Tbilisi, Georgia
- Coordinates: 41.65177034852144°N 44.83999011965689°E

Architecture
- Type: Georgian; Monastery
- Style: Monastic complex

Shavnabada Monastery (Georgian: შავნაბადა, romanized: shavnabada; also Shavnabada Monastery of St. George) is a medieval Georgian Orthodox monastic complex that is located upon Shavnabada Mountain, approximately 2 km away from Tbilisi, Georgia.

It was named in honor of St. George who, according to a local legend, wore a black cloak (Georgian: shavi nabadi, hence the mountain’s name) while leading the army of the king of Georgia in one of the victorious battles of the time. The monastery of Shavnabada is known for a rare variety of wine, also called Shavnabada, made by the monks there.
