= Panagia Galaktotrofousa Monastery =

Monastery in Cyprus

Coordinates: 34°51′23″N 33°22′53″E

- Ιερά Μονή Παναγια Γαλακτοτροφουσα
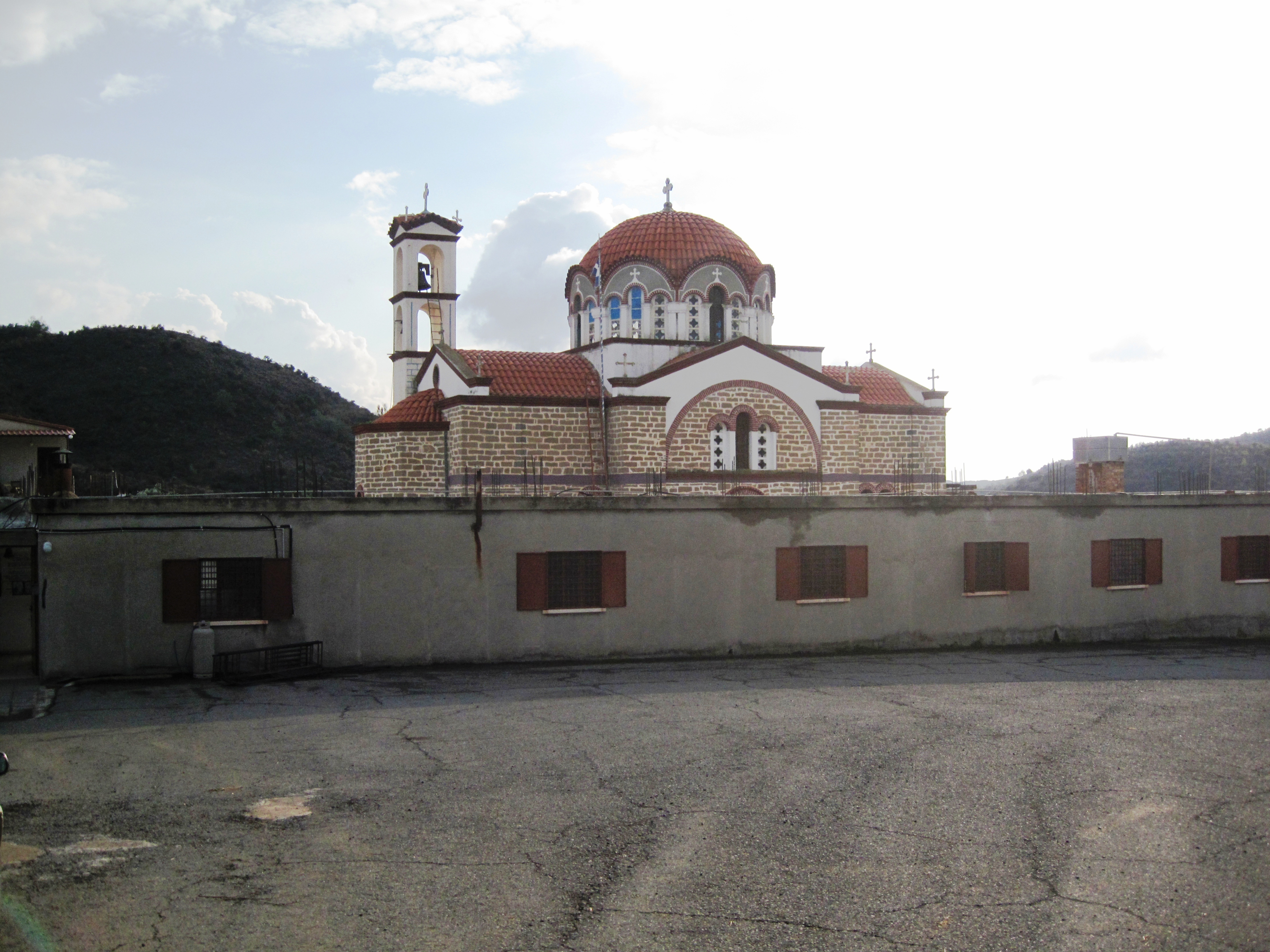
- Interactive map of Panagia Galaktotrofousa Monastery

Monastery information
- Dedication: Virgin Mary
- Diocese: Church of Cyprus

Site
- Location: Kofinou, Cyprus

Panagia Galaktotrofousa Monastery (Greek: Ιερά Μονή Παναγίας Γαλακτοτροφούσας) is a small Christian Orthodox monastery dedicated to the Virgin Mary and located near Kofinou, Cyprus.

In 2012, there were only three monks living in the monastery. The monastery consists of dormitories, a church in the courtyard, and some furnished rooms used as an exhibition space. One of the rooms shows the history of the monastery, and another room includes a showcase cabinet with the ossicles of the founder of the monastery. The monks make a living by producing and selling olive oil.

== Image gallery ==
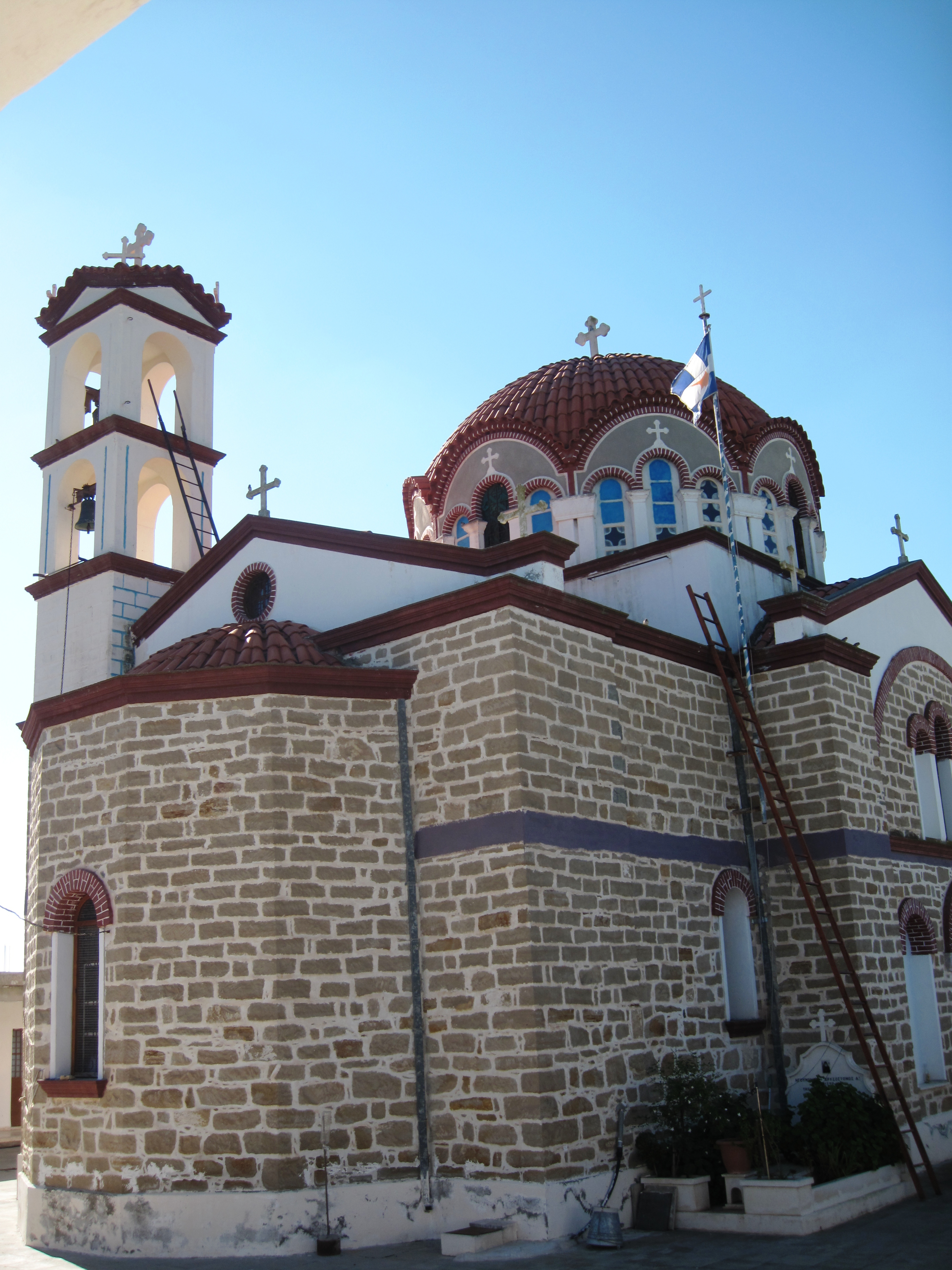
The church of the monastery

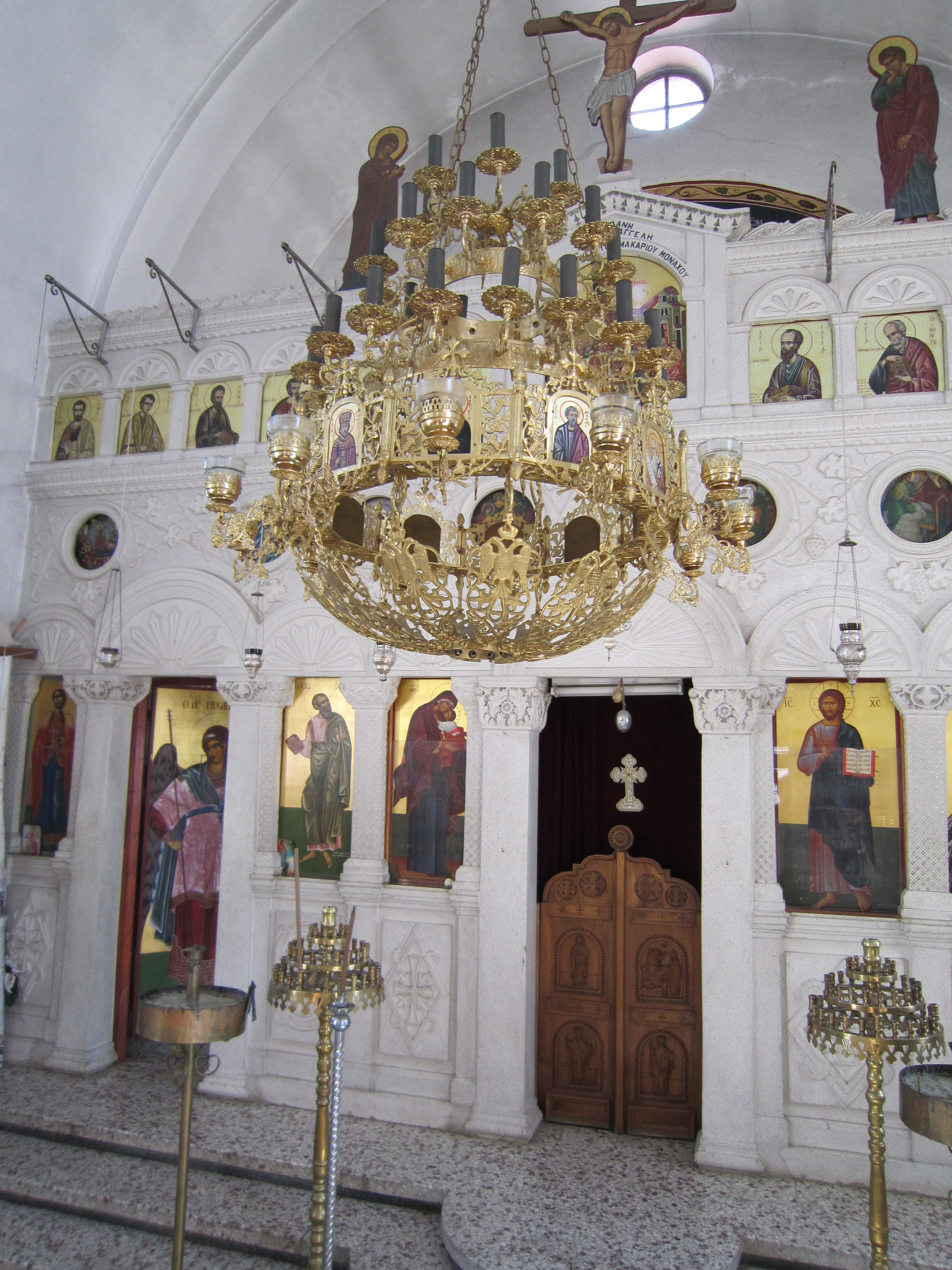
Church interior

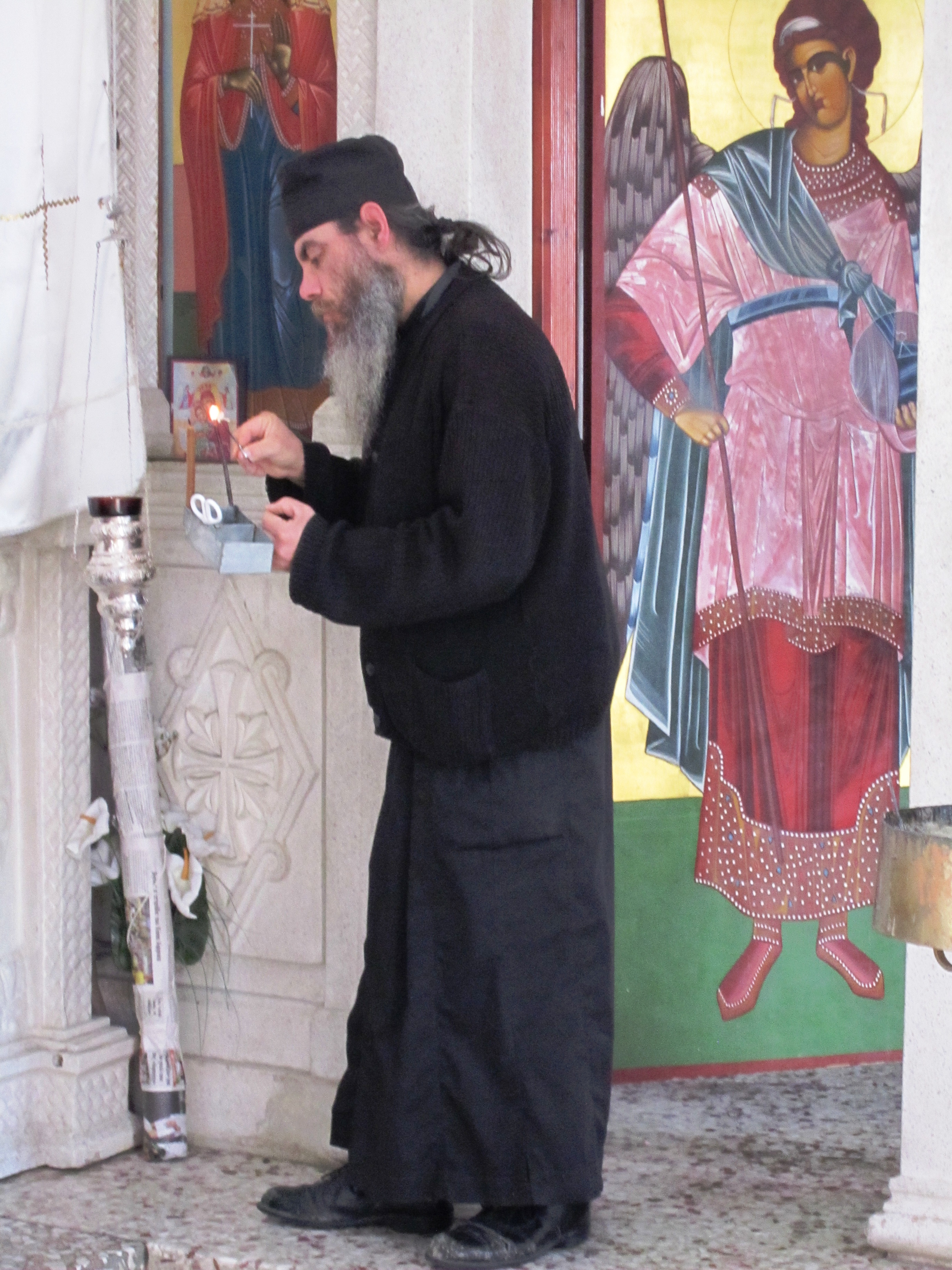
Monk working in the church

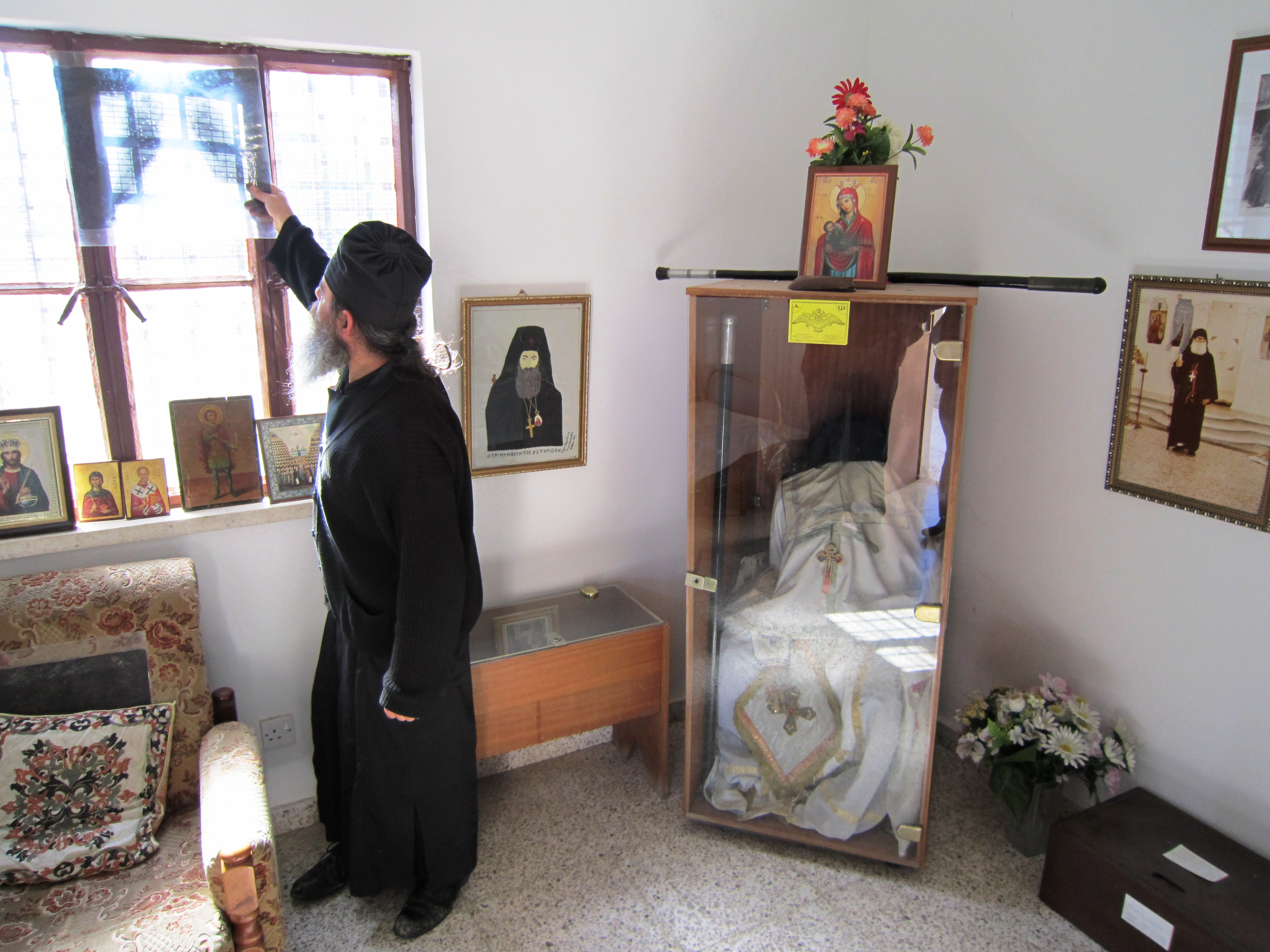
Monk with the mummy of the founder of X-rays of his lungs

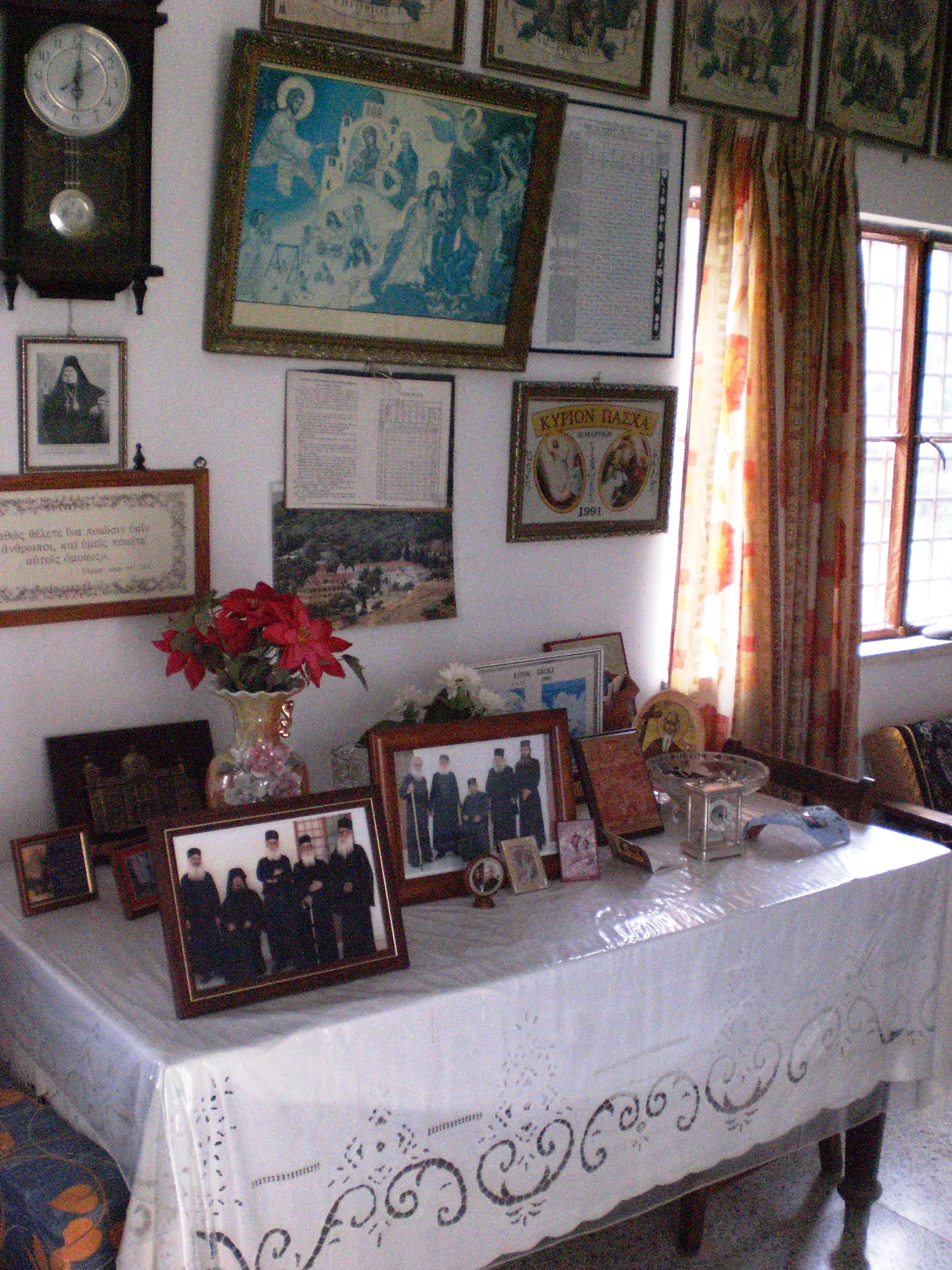
Church museum

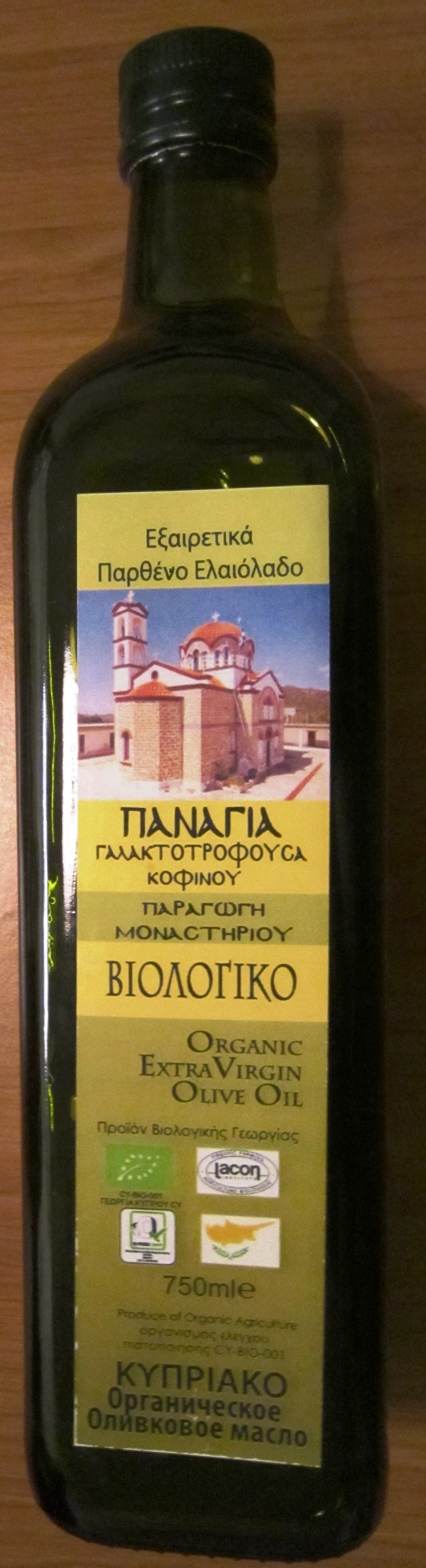
Bottle of olive oil from the monastery

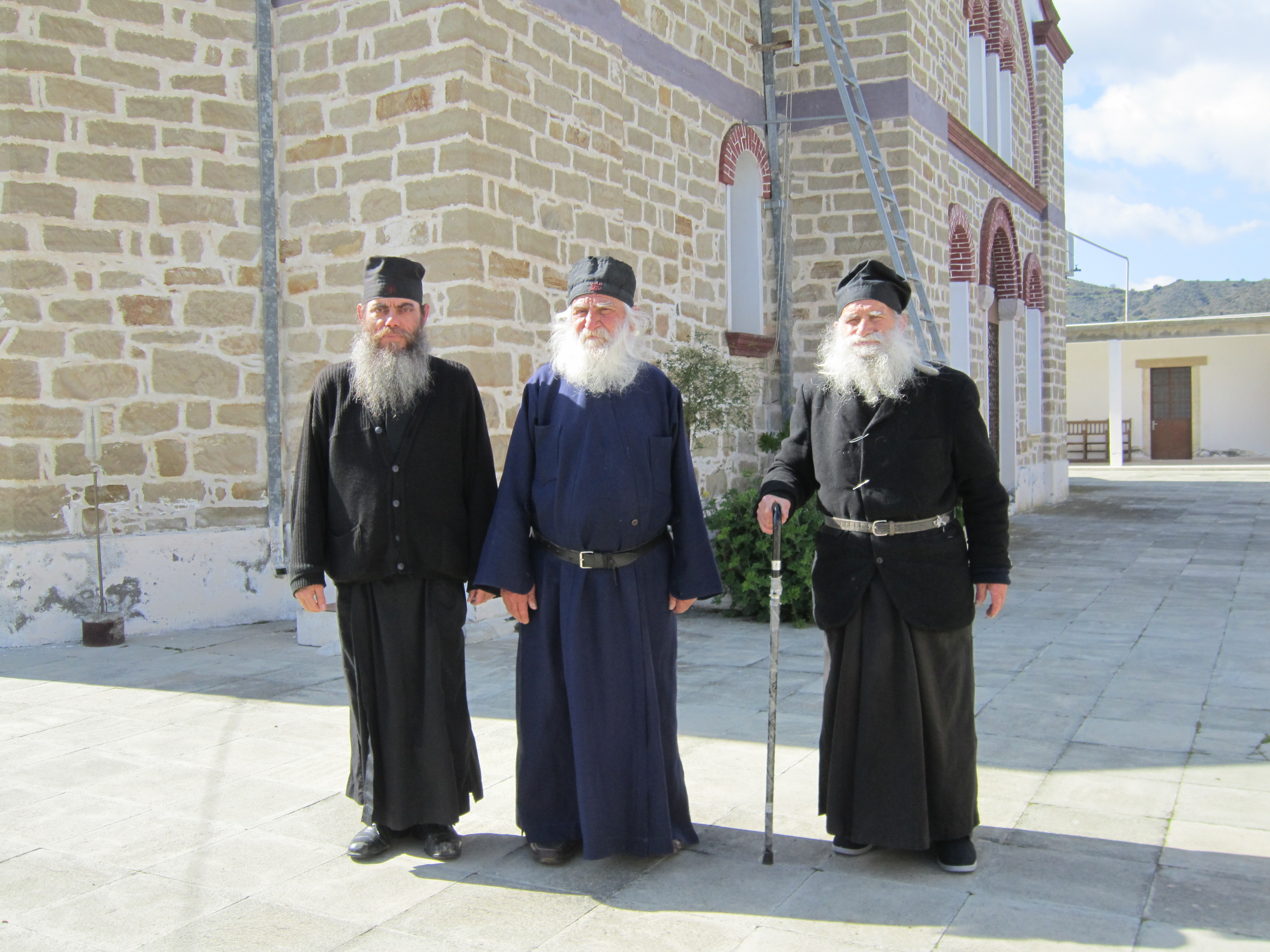
The monks of the monastery

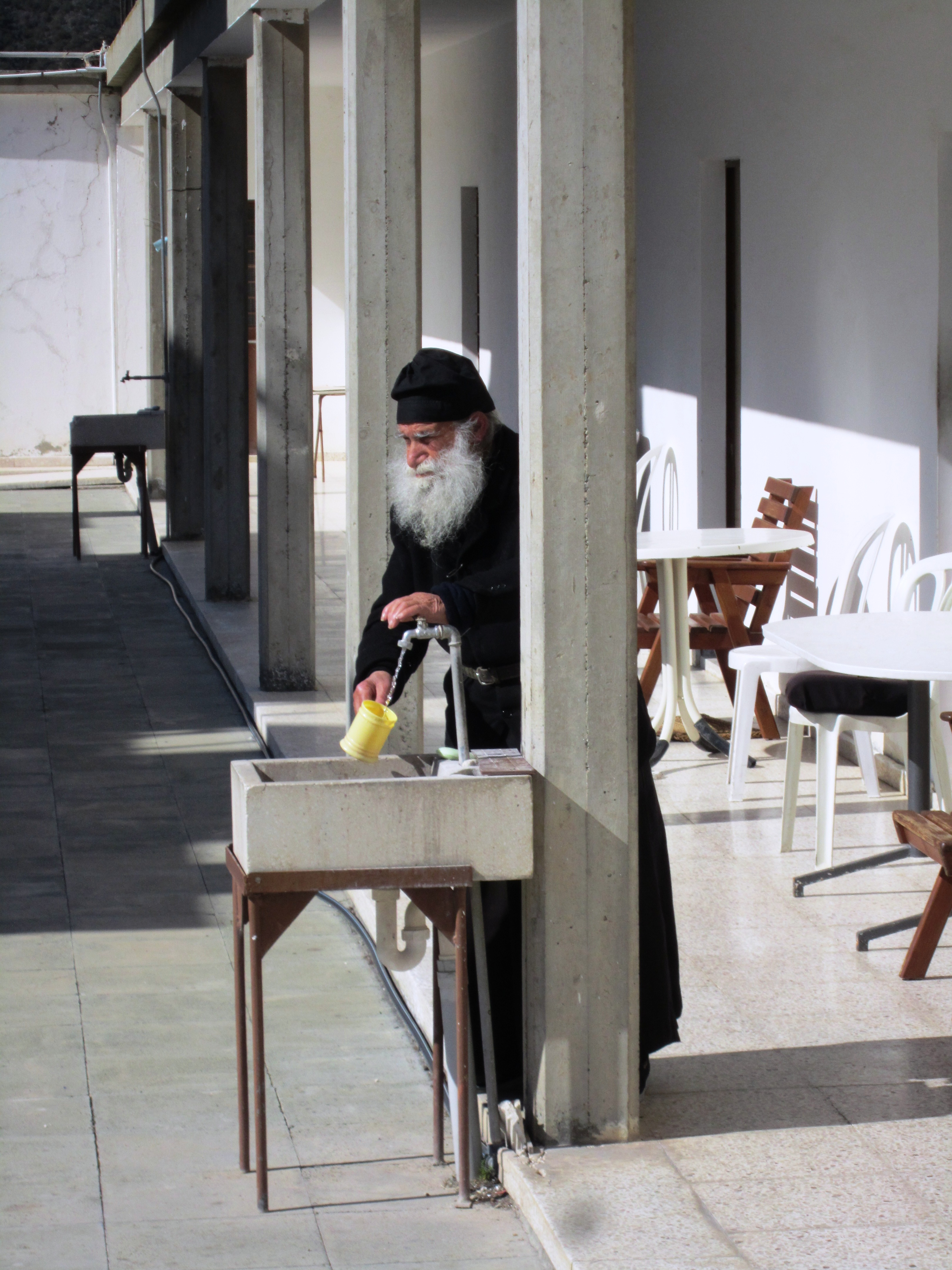
Monk takes water outside

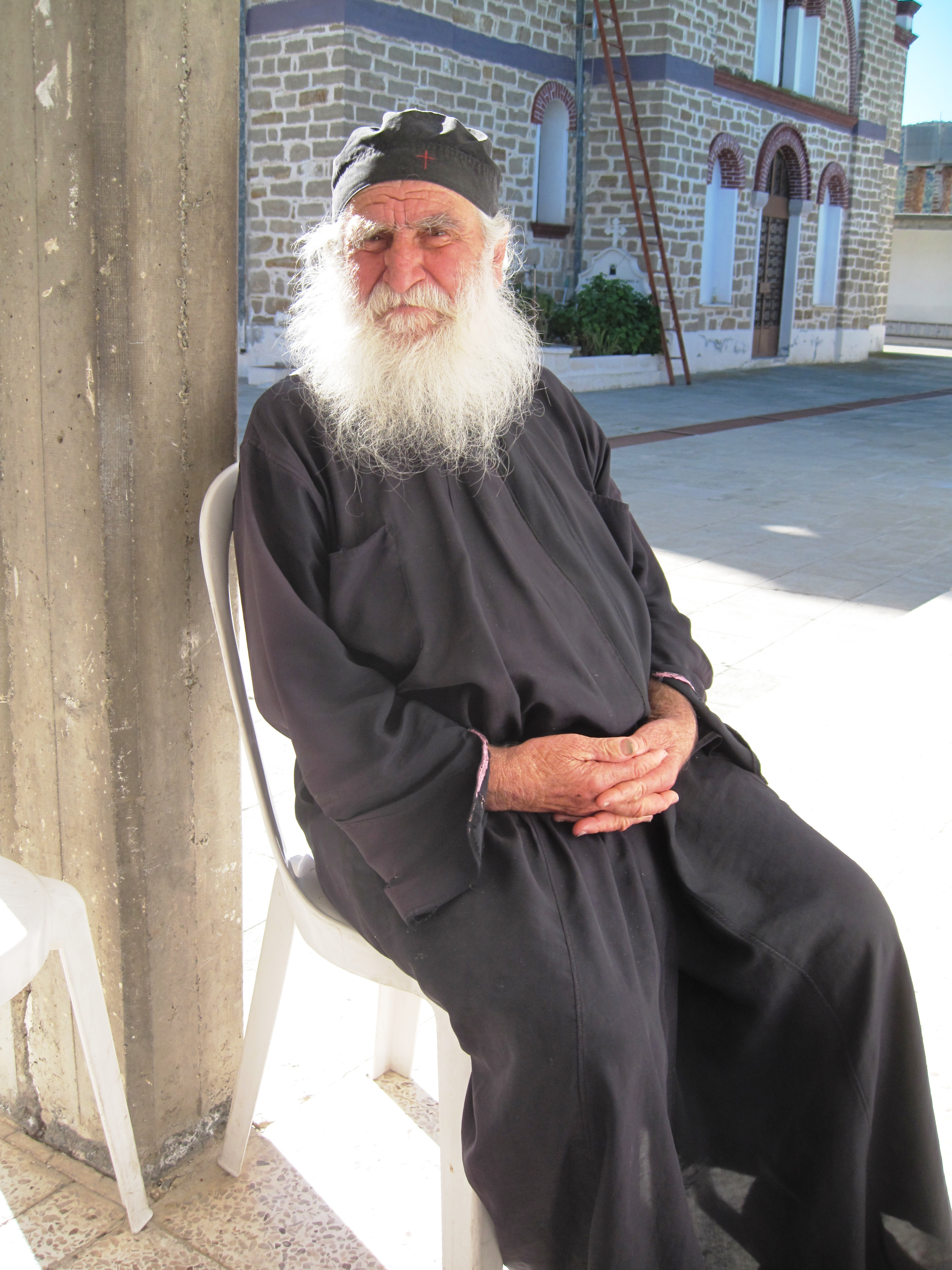
Monk sitting in the sun
