= Perşembe =

- District and municipality
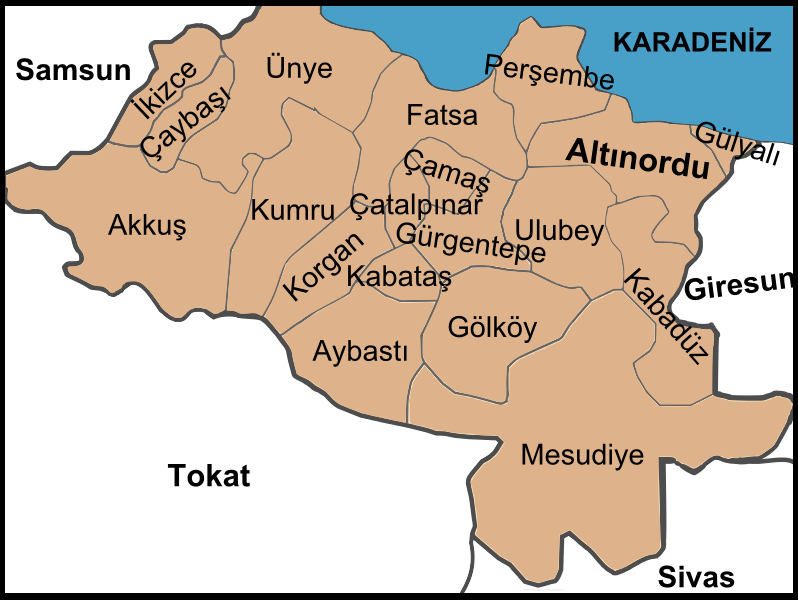
- Map showing Perşembe District in Ordu Province

- Location within Turkey
- Coordinates: 41°03′56″N 37°46′17″E
- Country: Turkey
- Province: Ordu

Government
  - Mayor: Cihat Albayrak (AKP)
- Area: 217 km^{2} (84 sq mi)
- Elevation: 20 m (66 ft)
- Population (2022): 30,101
  - Density: 139/km^{2} (359/sq mi)
- Time zone: UTC+3 (TRT)
- Postal code: 52750
- Area code: 0452
- Climate: Cfa
- Website: www.persembe.bel.tr

Perşembe is a municipality and district of Ordu Province, Turkey. Its area is 217 km^{2}, and its population is 30,101 (2022). The town lies on the Black Sea coast at an elevation of 20 m (66 ft).

== Legend and history ==
Perşembe is on the Vona Peninsula on the Black Sea coast and is held to be the point where the legendary Jason and the Argonauts were forced to land during their struggle with the storms and currents of the Black Sea.

For a long time Vona was part of the Roman Empire and its successors the Byzantine Empire and Empire of Trebizond. This era ended in 1461 when Trebizond was overturned by Sultan Mehmet II and Vona was brought into the Ottoman Empire, although there was a Turkish (Chepni Tribes) community in the town before this date. By 1520 the port of Vona was a predominantly Muslim town.

== Composition ==
There are 54 neighbourhoods in Perşembe District:

- Alınca
- Anaç
- Aziziye
- Babalı
- Bekirli
- Beyli
- Boğazcık
- Bolatlı
- Çamarası
- Çandır
- Çaytepe
- Çerli
- Çınar
- Dereiçi
- Doğanköy
- Düz
- Efirli
- Ekinciler
- Gündoğdu
- Güzelyurt
- Hacılar
- Hamidiye
- İmeçli
- İstanbulboğazı
- Kacalı
- Kaleyaka
- Kazancılı
- Kırlı
- Kovanlı
- Kozağzı
- Kurtuluş
- Kutluca
- Kuyluca
- Medreseönü
- Mersinköy
- Neneli
- Okçulu
- Ortatepe
- Ramazan
- Sarayköy
- Selimiye
- Şenyurt
- Sırakovancı
- Soğukpınar
- Tarlacık
- Tepecik
- Tepeköy
- Töngeldüzü
- Yarlı
- Yazlık
- Yeniköy
- Yeniöz
- Yeşilköy
- Yumrutaş

== See also ==
- Cape Jason
