= Chrysostom Monastery =

Monastery in Moscow, Russia

Coordinates: 55.7590°N 37.6340°E

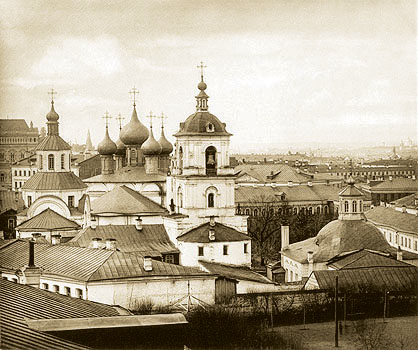
General view of the Chrysostom Monastery in 1882

The Chrysostom Monastery (Russian: Златоустовский монастырь, romanized: Zlatoustovskiy monastyr') was a monastery in Moscow. It was consecrated to Saint John Chrysostom (Russian: Ivan Zlatoust).

== History ==
The cloister to the east from the Kitai-gorod was first mentioned in 1412 when a Novgorod archdeacon was buried there. In 1478, Grand Prince Ivan III, who had a suburban palace nearby, had the wooden cathedral rebuilt in stone. When a Crimean Khan Devlet I Giray attacked Moscow in 1571, the monastery was burnt down. It was later restored, only to be damaged again in 1611 during the Time of Troubles.

In 1660, Ivan III's stone cathedral burnt down and was replaced by a new five-domed cathedral, which survived into the 20th century. In 1706, the monastery hegumen was raised to the rank of archmandrite. In 1737, the Chrysostom Monastery was gutted by fire, but it would be restored in 1738–1740.

The monastery subsisted owing to the donations from the noblemen who had their estates nearby, notably the Counts Apraksin and Rumyantsev. Some members of these families, particularly those who served in the Navy, were buried there: Matvei Apraksin, Fyodor Apraksin, Alexander Rumyantsev, Ivan Akimovich Senyavin.

In 1742, Empress Elizabeth visited the Chrysostom Monastery and donated 2,000 rubles for the construction of the Church of Saint Elizabeth. In 1764, the monastery was granted an annual allowance of 806 rubles and 30 kopecks, which would be increased to 1460 rubles during the reign of Paul I. During the Patriotic War of 1812, the sacristy of the monastery was moved to Vologda. The monastery itself was damaged by the French and then restored in 1816.

By 1907, there had been an archimandrite, 11 monks and 2 novices in the monastery. In the early 20th century, a parish school was opened on the grounds.

In 1933, the buildings of the Chrysostom Monastery were dismantled by the Soviets under pretext of their dilapidation. On its place, a constructivist edifice was erected. The graves of the Russian naval leaders were desecrated. The monastic cells of the Chrysostom Monastery, built in 1862, can still be seen in Maly Zlatoustinsky Lane in Moscow.

== Online references ==
- (in Russian) Chrysostom Abbey on www.pravoslavie.ru
