= St. George's Monastery, Sarandë =

Cultural monument of Albania

St. George's Monastery
- Manastiri i Shën Gjergjit (Albanian)
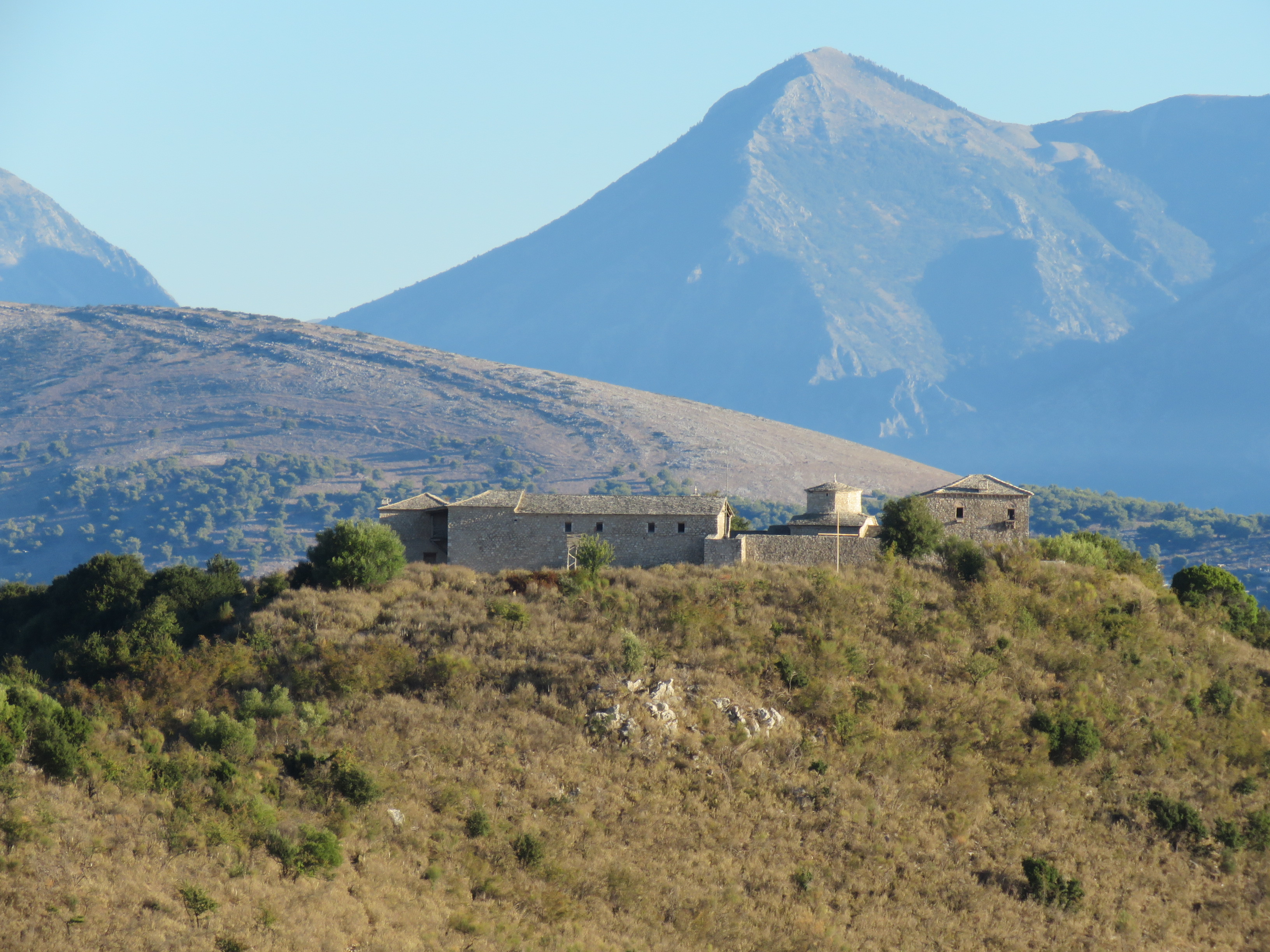
- The St. George's Monastery seen from the south in September 2022
- Interactive map of St. George's Monastery
- 39.8106°N 20.0095°E
- Location: near Sarandë

Cultural Monument of Albania

St. George's Monastery (Albanian: Manastiri i Shën Gjergjit) is an ancient Orthodox monastery in Demë, near Sarandë, Sarandë. It is Cultural Monument of Albania.
