= Cape Jason =

Cape in Ordu Province, Turkey

Coordinates: 41°8′0″N 37°41′0″E

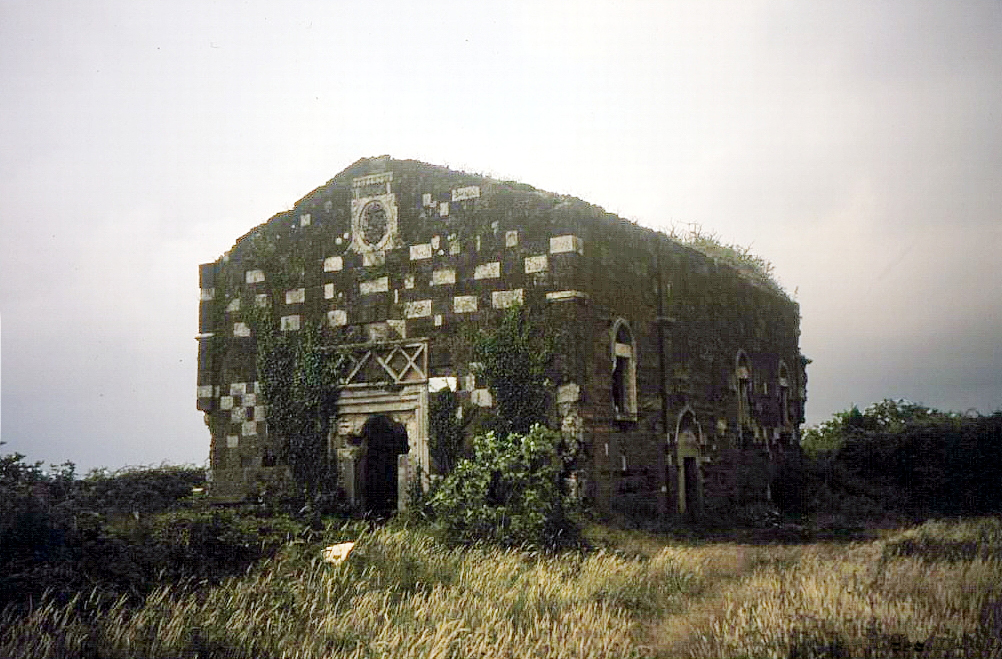
Greek Orthodox church at Cape Jason (1868).

Cape Jason (Turkish: Yason Burnu; Ancient Greek: Ιάσων or Ἰασόνιον or Ἰασονία, romanized: Iason or Iasonion or Iasonia; Latin: Iasonium or Jasonium) is a cape located at Çaytepe / Çaka (officially Aziziye) villages, Perşembe (formerly Vona) district, Ordu Province, Turkey (the North East Shores of Turkey). Its name is derived from the Greek mythological hero Jason of the Argonauts.

== History ==
Cape Jason harkens back to ancient times when a temple of Jason stood at the edge of the sea, protecting the sailors of Black Sea's treacherous waters. A church later replaced the temple with a similar mission. It now sits in total solitude in an overgrown cornfield next to a lighthouse overlooking the roaring waves of the Pontus.

Scylax of Caryanda write that there was a Greek acropolis there.

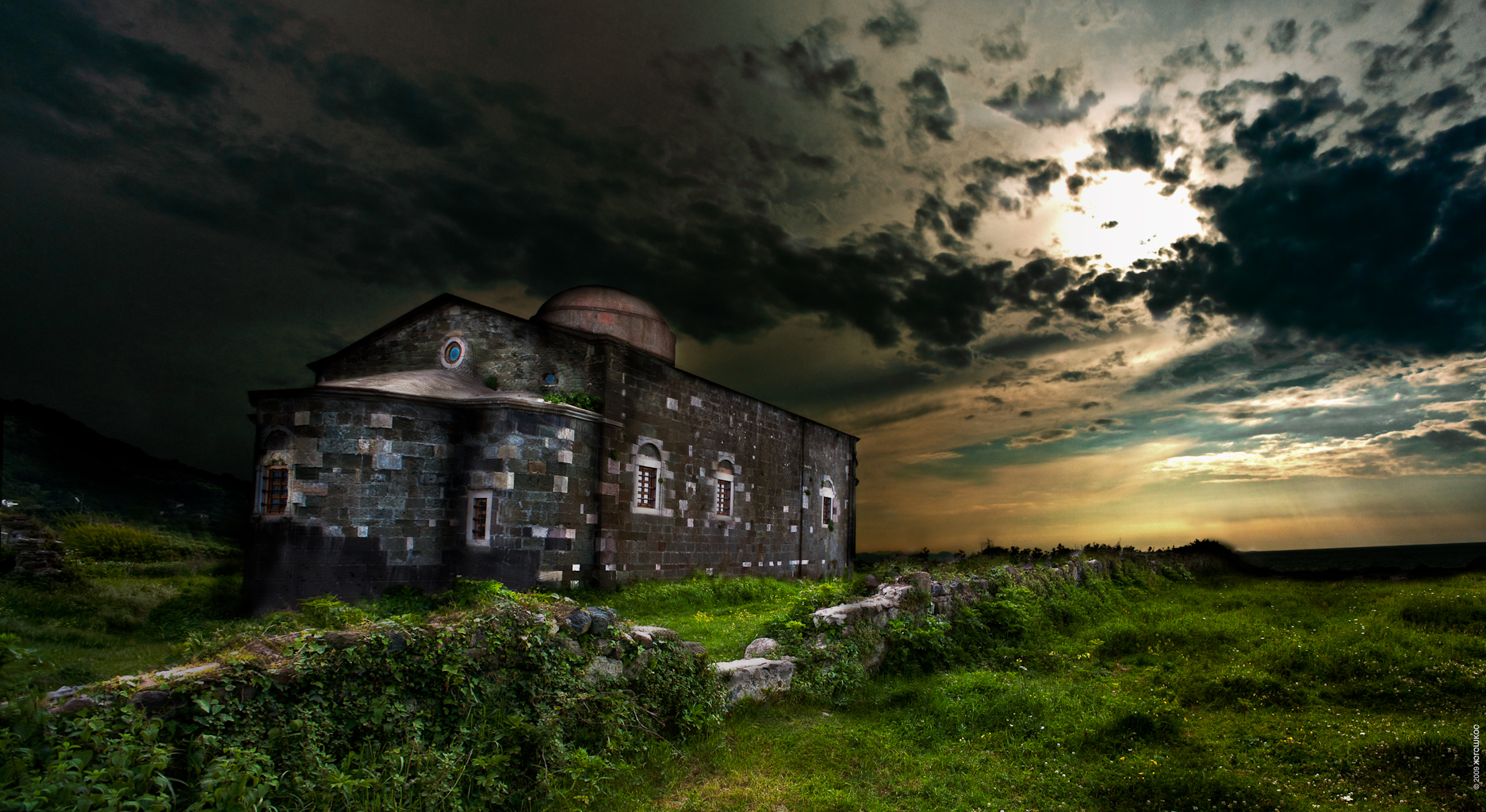
Jason Church, 2009

Cape Jason Natural and Archeological Site is on the borders of Çaytepe village in Perşembe county, on a small peninsula facing the sea. This area is currently a governmental environmental protection area, classified as second degree. The church still stands here, with the ruins of its garden wall. Parts of these ruins can be found all over the coast of the sea as well. Ancient ports and fish breeding pools can also still be seen today.

A church is located on Cape Jason. It was built in 1868 by Georgians and Greeks living in the region.
