= Monastery of Saint George, Skyros =

Medieval monastery on Skyros island, Greece

Coordinates: 38.9058°N 24.5674°E

The Monastery of Saint George of Skyros (Greek: Άη-Γώργης Σκυριανός) is a Byzantine monastery on the Greek island of Skyros.

The monastery was founded in AD 962 by Saint Athanasius the Athonite.

== See also ==
- Saint George in devotions, traditions and prayers
