= List of films about the Turkish War of Independence =

Below is an incomplete list of feature films, television films or television series which include events of the Turkish War of Independence. This list does not include documentaries, short films.

== 1920s ==
Year	Country	Main title (Alternative title)	Original title (Original script)	Director	Subject
1923	Turkey	The Daughter of Smyrna (The Shirt of Flame)	Ateşten Gömlek	Muhsin Ertuğrul	Drama, War. Based on the novel Ateşten Gömlek. Occupation of Smyrna, Greco-Turkish War
1929	Turkey	The Courier of Angola	Ankara Postası	Muhsin Ertuğrul	Drama, War. Based on the play Bir Gece Faciası.

== 1930s ==
Year	Country	Main title (Alternative title)	Original title (Original script)	Director	Subject
1932	Turkey	A Nation Is Awaking	Bir Millet Uyanıyor	Muhsin Ertuğrul	Drama, History, War. Based on the novel Bir Millet Uyanıyor.

== 1940s ==
Year	Country	Main title (Alternative title)	Original title (Original script)	Director	Subject
1946	Turkey	The Passenger of Domaniç	Domaniç Yolcusu / Unutulan Sır	Şakir Sırmalı	Crime, Drama, Mystery. Based on the book Domaniç Dağlarının Yolcusu.
1948	Turkey	The Independence Medal	İstiklal Madalyası	Ferdi Tayfur	Drama, War. Medal of Independence (Turkey)
1949	Turkey	Fato: Independence or Death	Fato / Ya İstiklal Ya Ölüm	Turgut Demirağ	Drama, War. Occupation of Smyrna, Greco-Turkish War
1949	Turkey	Strike the Whore	Vurun Kahpeye	Lütfi Ömer Akad	Drama, War. Based on the novel Vurun Kahpeye.

== 1950s ==
Year	Country	Main title (Alternative title)	Original title (Original script)	Director	Subject
1950	Turkey	Captain Tahsin	Yüzbaşı Tahsin	Orhon Murat Arıburnu	Drama, Romance. Based on an unknown short story.
1950	Turkey	The Guerilla	Çete	Çetin Karamanbey	Drama, Adventure, War. Based on the novel Çete.
1950	Turkey		Ateşten Gömlek	Vedat Örfi Bengü	Drama, War. Based on the novel Ateşten Gömlek. Occupation of Smyrna, Greco-Turkish War
1951	Turkey	Goodbye!	Allaha Ismarladık	Sami Ayanoğlu	Drama, Romance, War. Based on an unknown novel.
1951	Turkey		Ege Kahramanları	Nuri Akıncı	Drama, War.
1951	Turkey	The Song of Freedom	Hürriyet Şarkısı	Faruk Kenç	Drama, War.
1951	Turkey		İstanbul Kan Ağlarken	Kani Kıpçak	Crime, Drama. Occupation of Istanbul
1951	Turkey	The City That Liberated Itself	Kendini Kurtaran Şehir; Şanlı Maraş	Faruk Kenç	Drama, War. Battle of Marash, Franco-Turkish War
1951	Turkey	The Banishment	Sürgün	Orhon Murat Arıburnu	Drama, Romance.
1951	Turkey	For the Motherland	Vatan İçin	Aydın G. Arakon	Drama, War.
1952	Turkey	Between Two Bayonets	İki Süngü Arasında	Şadan Kâmil	Drama.
1952	Turkey		İngiliz Kemal Lawrense Karşı	Lütfi Ömer Akad	Adventure, War. Based on the memoirs of Ahmet Esat Tomruk. Occupation of Istanbul
1952	Turkey		Destan Destan İçinde	Seyfi Havaeri	Drama, War.
1952	Turkey		Hürriyet İçin Şahlanan Belde	Mümtaz Ener	Drama, War.
1953	Turkey	The Victory Sun	Zafer Güneşi	Seyfi Havaeri	Drama.
1954	Turkey		Hürriyet Uğruna Mukaddes Yalan	Muharrem Gürses	Drama, War.
1954	Turkey	The Independence War	İstiklal Harbi; Ruhların Mucizesi	Hayri Esen	Drama, War.
1957	France; Italy	He Who Must Die	Celui qui doit mourir	Jules Dassin	Drama. Based on the novel Christ Recrucified. Greco-Turkish War
1958	Turkey		Bu Vatan Bizimdir	Nejat Saydam	Drama, War.
1958	Turkey		İstiklal Uğrunda	Rahmi Kafadar	Drama, War.
1958	Turkey	The Unknown Heroes	Meçhul Kahramanlar	Agah Hün	Drama, Romance, War. Kuva-yi Milliye
1958	Turkey		Şahinler Diyarı	Nejat Saydam	Adventure. Siege of Aintab, Franco-Turkish War
1959	Turkey	This Land's Children	Bu Vatanın Çocukları	Atıf Yılmaz	Drama, War.
1959	Turkey		Beklenen Bomba	Muharrem Gürses	Drama, War.
1959	Turkey	Enemy Cuts Off Roads	Düşman Yolları Kesti	Osman F. Seden	Drama, War.
1959	Turkey	Yörük Efe, the Falcon of the Mountains	Dağlar Şahini Yörük Efe	Muharrem Gürses	Adventure, Drama, History.
1959	Turkey		Kalpaklılar	Nejat Saydam	Drama, Romance, War. Based on the novel Kalpaklılar.
1959	Turkey	Izmir Is Burning	İzmir Ateşler İçinde	Nuri Ergün	Drama, Romance, War.
1959	Turkey	His Cavalryman	Onun Süvarisi	Nusret Eraslan	Drama, War.

== 1960s ==
Year	Country	Main title (Alternative title)	Original title (Original script)	Director	Subject
1960	Turkey	Superior to Love	Aşktan da Üstün	Osman F. Seden	Drama, Romance.
1960	Turkey	A Drop of Fire	Ateşten Damla	Memduh Ün	Drama, Romance, War.
1960	Turkey		Küçük Kahraman	Türker İnanoğlu	Drama, War.
1960	Turkey	The Devoted Corporal	Fedakar Onbaşı	Yavuz Yalınkılıç	Adventure.
1960	Turkey		Vatan ve Namus	Nejat Saydam	Drama.
1961	Turkey	The Black Angel	Siyah Melek (Zincirler Kırılırken)	Sami Ayanoğlu	Drama, Romance, War.
1961	Turkey		Vatan Fedaileri	Şinasi Özonuk	Adventure.
1961	Turkey	The Three Heroes	Kahraman Üçler	Semih Evin	Drama, War.
1962	Turkey	Dikmen Star	Dikmen Yıldızı	Asaf Tengiz	Romance. Based on the novel Dikmen Yıldızı.
1962	Turkey		Vatan Uğruna	Rahmi Kafadar	
1962	Turkey		Vatan Uğruna	Nişan Hançer	
1962	Turkey		Silah Arkadaşları	Şinasi Özonuk	Drama, War. Greco-Turkish War
1964	Turkey	The Lions of Gallipoli	Çanakkale Aslanları	Turgut Demirağ	Drama, Romance, War.
1964	Turkey	Mountains Covered in Smoke	Dağ Başını Duman Almış	Memduh Ün	Drama, War. Occupation of Smyrna, Greco-Turkish War
1964	Turkey	Three Cavalrymen of Kocatepe	Kocatepe'nin Üç Süvarisi	Yavuz Yalınkılıç	Drama, War.
1964	Turkey		Vurun Kahpeye	Orhan Aksoy	Drama, War. Based on the novel Vurun Kahpeye.
1965	Turkey		Bize Türk Derler	Nuri Akıncı	Drama, War.
1965	Turkey	The Bloody Castle	Kanlı Kale	Yavuz Yalınkılıç	Adventure.
1965	Turkey	Ten Fearless Women	On Korkusuz Kadın	Tunç Başaran	Adventure, War. Occupation of Smyrna, Greco-Turkish War
1965	Turkey	Goodbye, Istanbul	Allahaısmarladık İstanbul	Semih Evin	Drama, War. Occupation of Istanbul
1966	Turkey	Goodbye!	Allahaısmarladık	Nejat Saydam	Drama, Romance, War. Based on the novel Allahaısmarladık.
1966	Turkey	A Nation Awakens	Bir Millet Uyanıyor	Ertem Eğilmez	Drama, War.
1966	Turkey		Ayyıldız Fedaileri	Semih Evin	Drama, War.
1966	Turkey		Bombacı Emine	Nuri Akıncı	Drama, War.
1966	Turkey		Kahramanlar Köyü	Kemal Kan	Drama, War.
1966	Turkey		Topal Osman	Ahmet Ural Ozon	Drama, War. Topal Osman
1966	Turkey		Kara Fatma	Nuri Akıncı	Drama, War. Fatma Seher Erden
1966	Turkey		Kadin kahramanlarimiz	Nuri Akıncı	Drama, War.
1967	Turkey	Last Night	Son Gece	Memduh Ün	Drama, Romance, War. Based on the novel Son Gece.
1968	Turkey	English Kemal	İngiliz Kemal	Ertem Eğilmez	Adventure, Drama, War. Based on the memoirs of Ahmet Esat Tomruk. Occupation of Istanbul
1968	Turkey	I have the right to kill	Öldürmek Hakkımdır	Nuri Ergün	Adventure, Drama, War.
1968	Turkey		Derebeyi	Yavuz Figenli	Drama, War.
1969	Turkey	Fato / Either Independence or Death	Fato / Ya İstiklal Ya Ölüm	Feyzi Tuna	Drama, War. Occupation of Smyrna, Greco-Turkish War
1969	Turkey		Üç Namus Bekçisi	Kayahan Arıkan	Drama, War.

== 1970s ==
Year	Country	Main title (Alternative title)	Original title (Original script)	Director	Subject
1970	United Kingdom; United States	You Can't Win 'Em All		Peter Collinson	Action, Adventure, Comedy, War.
1970	Turkey	Letter from the Dungeon	Zindandan Gelen Mektup	Sırrı Gültekin	Drama, War.
1973	Turkey	Vurun Kahpeye		Halit Refiğ	Drama. Based on the novel Vurun Kahpeye.
1973	Turkey	Between Two Bayonets	İki Süngü Arasında	Ülkü Erakalın	Drama.
1974	Turkey	Resho: For the Homeland	Reşo: Vatan İçin	Çetin İnanç	Adventure, War. Based on the play Viva Zapata.
1974	Turkey	Heroes	Kahramanlar	Remzi Aydın Jöntürk	
1974	Turkey	Bloody War	Kanlı Savaş	Murat Akovalıgil	Adventure, History, War.
1978	Greece	1922		Nikos Koundouros	Drama, History. Based on the novel Number 31328. Greek genocide, Greco-Turkish War

== 2000s ==
Year	Country	Main title (Alternative title)	Original title (Original script)	Director	Subject
2007	Turkey	The Last Ottoman	Son Osmanlı Yandım Ali	Mustafa Şevki Doğan	Action, Comedy, Drama, History, War. Based on the comic book Son Osmanlı Yandım Ali.

== 2010s ==
Year	Country	Main title (Alternative title)	Original title (Original script)	Director	Subject
2010	Turkey	Veda		Zülfü Livaneli	Biography, Drama, History, War. Based on the memoirs of Salih Bozok. Mustafa Kemal Atatürk
2010	Turkey		Kubilay	Ahmet Faik Akıncı	History. Mustafa Fehmi Kubilay
2013	Turkey	Stone School	Taş Mektep	Altan Dönmez	Drama, History, War. Kayseri High School, Battle of the Sakarya, Greco-Turkish War
2013	Turkey	Topal Osman, Atatürk's Loyal Follower	Atatürk'ün Fedaisi Topal Osman	Atilla Akarsu	Drama, History. Topal Osman
2014	Australia; United States; Turkey	The Water Diviner		Russell Crowe	Drama, History, War.
2018	Turkey	Hürkuş: The Hero in the Skies	Hürkuş: Göklerdeki Kahraman	Kudret Sabancı	Biography, History, War. Vecihi Hürkuş

== 2020s ==
Year	Country	Main title (Alternative title)	Original title (Original script)	Director	Subject
2021	Greece; United States; Cyprus	Smyrna, My Beloved	Σμύρνη μου αγαπημένη	Grigoris Karantinakis	Drama, History, War. Based on the play Smyrna, My Beloved. Burning of Smyrna, Greco-Turkish War
2021	Turkey		Âkif	Sadullah Şentürk	Biography, Drama, History. İstiklal Marşı
2022	Turkey		Kurtuluş Hattı	Selman Kayabaşı	Drama, History. Ahmet Hamdi Martonaltı
2023	Turkey		Atatürk 1881-1919	Mehmet Ada Öztekin	Biography, Drama, History, War. Mustafa Kemal Atatürk
2023	Turkey	The Last Dinner	Son Akşam Yemeği	Levent Onan	Biography, Drama, History. Mustafa Kemal Atatürk, Proclamation of the Republic of Turkey
2024	Turkey		Atatürk 2: 1881-1919	Mehmet Ada Öztekin	Biography, Drama, History, War. Mustafa Kemal Atatürk
2024	Turkey	Colour of Victory	Zaferin Rengi	Abdullah Oğuz	Drama, History, Sport. Fenerbahçe S.K., General Harington Cup, Occupation of Istanbul
2025	Turkey	Dark Territory	Tehlikeli Bölge	Ramazan Ekmekçi	History.

== Television series ==
Year	Country	Main title (Alternative title)	Original title (Original script)	Director	Subject
1979	Turkey	Tired Warrior	Yorgun Savaşçı	Halit Refiğ	Drama, War. Based on the novel Yorgun Savaşçı.
1983	Turkey		Küçük Ağa	Yücel Çakmaklı	Drama, War. Based on the novel Küçük Ağa.
1986	Turkey	Wren	Çalıkuşu	Osman F. Seden	Drama. Based on the novel Çalıkuşu.
1987	Turkey	Days of Fire	Ateşten Günler	Ziya Öztan	Drama, History, War. Based on the novel Ateşten Gömlek. Occupation of Smyrna, Greco-Turkish War
1993	Turkey	Tired Warrior	Yorgun Savaşçı	Tunca Yönder	Drama. Based on the novel Yorgun Savaşçı.
1994	Turkey	Liberation	Kurtuluş	Ziya Öztan	Drama, History, War.
2003-5	Turkey	Bullet Wound	Kurşun Yarası	Özer Kızıltan; Cemal Şan; Sadullah Celen	Adventure, History.
2006-7	Turkey	Broken Wings	Kırık Kanatlar	Çağatay Tosun; Faruk Teber; Temel Gürsu; Cevdet Mercan; Haluk Bener	Drama, History, Romance, War.
2007-8	Turkey	Black Snake	Karayılan	Cem Akyoldaş; Feride Kaytan	Action, Drama, History, Romance, War. Molla Mehmet Karayılan, Siege of Aintab, Franco-Turkish War
2012	Turkey		Ustura Kemal	Mustafa Şevki Doğan	Action, Drama, History. Occupation of Istanbul
2012	Turkey		Veda	Merve Girgin	Biography, Drama, History. Occupation of Istanbul
2016-18	Turkey	Wounded Love	Vatanım Sensin	The Taylan Brothers; Burak Arlıel	Drama, History, Romance, War. Mustafa Mümin Aksoy, Occupation of Smyrna
2020	Turkey	Either Freedom or Death	Ya İstiklal Ya Ölüm	Yasin Uslu	Drama, History. Mustafa Kemal Atatürk, Kuva-yi Milliye, Mim Mim Grubu, Occupation of Istanbul
2023	Turkey		Akif	Selahattin Sancaklı	Biography, Drama, History. Mehmet Akif Ersoy, İstiklal Marşı
2024	Turkey		Atatürk 1881-1919	Mehmet Ada Öztekin	Biography, Drama, History, War. Mustafa Kemal Atatürk
