= 3rd Antalya Golden Orange Film Festival =

1966 Turkish film festival

- Location: Antalya, Turkey
- Awards: Golden Orange
- Festival date: May 24-June 4, 1966
- Website: http://www.aksav.org.tr/en/

Antalya Film Festival
- 4th 2nd

The 3rd Antalya Golden Orange Film Festival (Turkish: 3. Antalya Altın Portakal Film Festivali) was held from May 24 to June 4, 1966, in Antalya, Turkey. Golden Oranges were awarded in thirteen categories to the Turkish films made in the preceding year which were selected to compete in the festival's National Feature Film Competition.

== National Feature Film Competition ==
Jury Members
Julien Jenger
Claude Mathiss
Harry Keith
Nejat Duru
Turgut Demirağ
Orhon M. Arıburnu
Kemal Baysal
Dr. Alyanak
Mücahit Beşer
Ümit Deniz
Dr. Burhanettin Onat
Baykan Tözgen
Ethem Soykan
Ata Karatay

=== Golden Orange Awards ===
The National Feature Film Competition Jury, headed by Nejat Duru, awarded Golden Oranges in twelve categories.

- 1st Best Film: Corrupt Order (Turkish: Bozuk Düzen) directed by Haldun Dormen
- 2nd Best Film: Blood of the Earth (Turkish: Toprağın Kanı) directed by Atıf Yılmaz
- 3rd Best Film: Murad's Song (Turkish: Muradın Türküsü) directed by Atıf Yılmaz
- Best Director: Memduh Ün For My Honor (Turkish: Namusum İçin)
- Best Screenplay: Erol Keskin & Haldun Dormen for Corrupt Order (Turkish: Bozuk Düzen)
- Best Cinematography: Mustafa Yılmaz for For My Honor (Turkish: Namusum İçin)
- Best Original Music: Nedim Otyam for The Rebels (Turkish: İsyancılar)
- Best Actress: Selma Güneri for Last Birds (Turkish: Son Kuşlar) & I Live as Long as I Die (Turkish: Ben Öldükçe Yaşarım)
- Best Actor: Ekrem Bora for Bitch (Turkish: Sürtük)
- Best Supporting Actress: Yıldız Kenter for The Rebels (Turkish: İsyancılar)
- Best Supporting Actor: Müşfik Kenter for Corrupt Order (Turkish: Bozuk Düzen)
- Best Studio:Acar Film Studio (Turkish: Acar Film Stüdyosu) for For My Honor (Turkish: Namusum İçin)

== National Short Film Competition ==
=== Golden Orange Awards ===
- Best Short Film: Love of the Stones (Turkish: Taşların Aşkı) directed by Behlül Dal

== See also ==
- 1966 in film
