= 1st Antalya Golden Orange Film Festival =

1964 Turkish film festival

- Location: Antalya, Turkey
- Awards: Golden Orange
- Festival date: October 4–10, 1964
- Website: http://www.aksav.org.tr/en/

Antalya Film Festival
- 2nd

The 1st Antalya Golden Orange Film Festival (Turkish: 1. Antalya Altın Portakal Film Festivali) was held from October 4 to 10, 1964 in Antalya, Turkey. It was initiated by Avni Tolunay, who had been patronising summer concerts and plays at the historical Aspendos Theatre since the mid-1950s and had become the mayor of Antalya the previous year. He also chose the orange as the symbol of the festival.

The festival, which had the stated aim "to support the sector of Turkish cinema in material and moral terms, to pave the way for Turkish cinema to be opened to the international platform by encouraging Turkish film producers to produce qualified productions," was held under what the official website describes as "difficult conditions" but generated "a great interest" nonetheless. Golden Oranges were awarded in seven categories to the six Turkish films made in the preceding year which were selected to compete in the festival's National Feature Film Competition.

== National Feature Film Competition ==
Jury Members
Avni Tolunay
Mrs. Tolunay
Burhanettin Onat
İsmail Hakkı Onay
Hadi Yaman
Selahattin Burçkin
Mustafa Yücel
Faruk Kenç

=== Golden Orange Awards ===
The National Feature Film Competition Jury, headed by Avni Tolunay, awarded Golden Oranges in seven categories.

- Best Film: Birds of Exile (Turkish: Gurbet Kuşları) directed by Halit Refiğ
- Best Director: Halit Refiğ for Birds of Exile (Turkish: Gurbet Kuşları)
- Best Cinematography: Ali Uğur for Bitter Life (Turkish: Acı Hayat)
- Best Actress: Türkan Şoray for Bitter Life (Turkish: Acı Hayat)
- Best Actor: İzzet Günay for Trees Die Standing (Turkish: Ağaçlar Ayakta Ölür)
- Best Supporting Actress: Yıldız Kenter for Trees Die Standing (Turkish: Ağaçlar Ayakta Ölür)
- Best Supporting Actor: Ulvi Uraz for Tomorrow Is for You (Turkish: Yarın Bizimdir)

=== Official Selection ===
Six Turkish films made in the preceding year were selected to compete in the festival's National Feature Film Competition.

- Birds of Exile (Turkish: Gurbet Kuşları) directed by Halit Refiğ
- Bitter Life (Turkish: Acı Hayat) directed by Metin Erksan
- Tomorrow Is for You (Turkish: Yarın Bizimdir) directed by Atıf Yılmaz
- Trees Die Standing (Turkish: Ağaçlar Ayakta Ölür) directed by Memduh Ün
- The Angry Young Man (Turkish: Kızgın Delikanlı) directed by Ertem Göreç
- Ayrılan Yollar directed by Ertem Göreç

== See also ==
- 1964 in film
