= Türkan Şoray =

Turkish actress, writer and film director

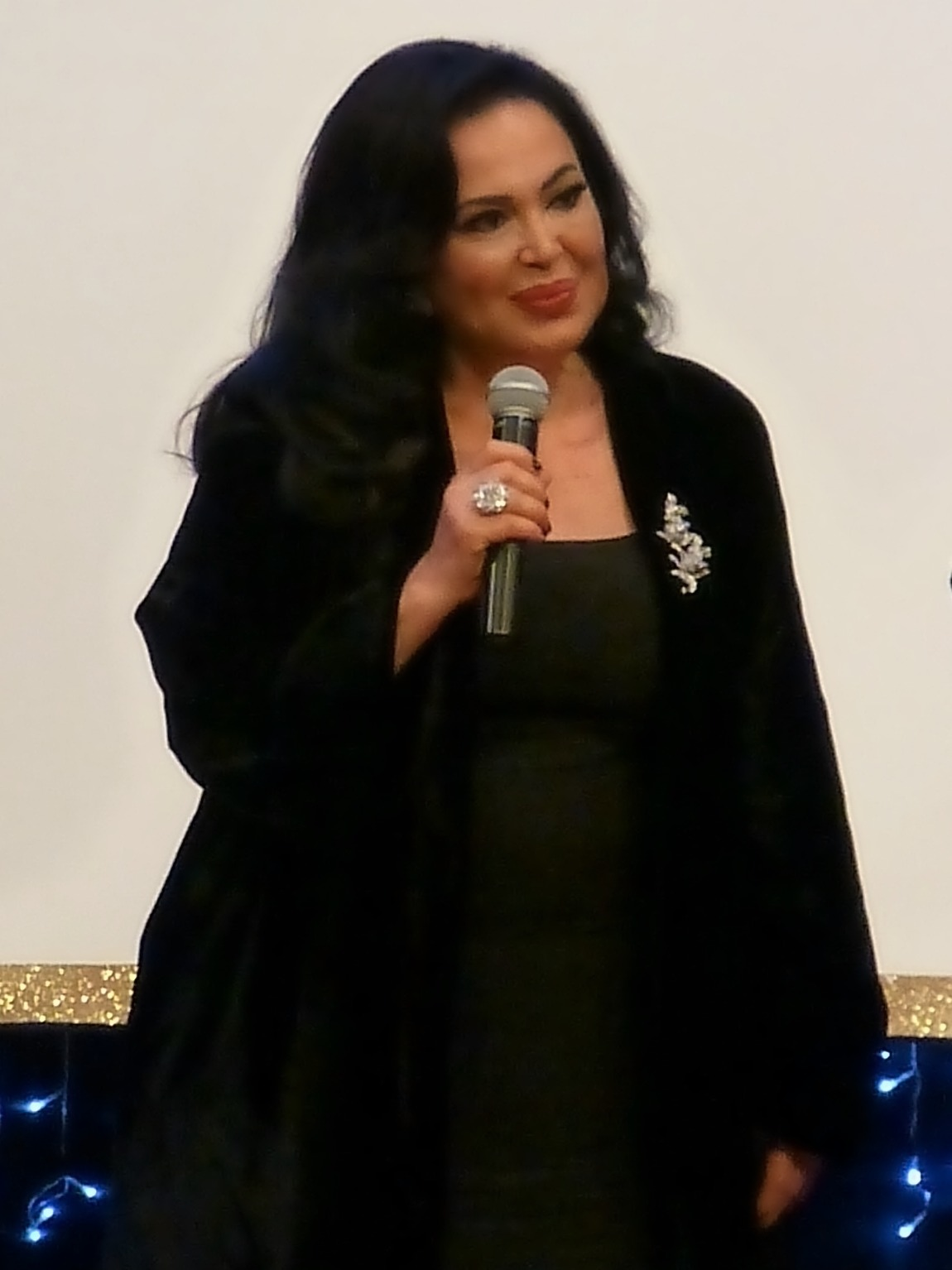
- Şoray in 2013
- Born: 28 June 1945 (age 81); Eyüp, Istanbul, Turkey
- Occupations: Actress; director; writer
- Years active: 1960–present
- Spouse: Cihan Ünal (m. 1983; div. 1987)
- Children: 1
- Relatives: Nazan Şoray (sister)
- Awards: Golden Orange for Best Actress (1964, 1968, 1987, 1994); Golden Boll for Best Actress (1972); Golden Orange for Life Achievement (1996)

Türkan Şoray (born 28 June 1945) is a Turkish actress, writer and film director. She is known as "Sultan" of the Cinema of Turkey. She started her career in 1960, and won her first award as the most successful actress at the 1st Antalya Golden Orange Film Festival for the movie Acı Hayat. Having appeared in more than 222 films, Şoray has starred in the most feature films for a female actress worldwide. On 12 March 2010, Şoray was chosen as a UNICEF goodwill ambassador in Turkey, about which she said: "I think there is nothing that cannot be done with love. If we combine power with love, we can overcome many problems".

Together with Hülya Koçyiğit, Filiz Akın and Fatma Girik, she is an icon for a golden age in Turkish cinematography and is often regarded as one of the four most important actresses in Turkish cinema. Out of these actresses, Şoray is the only one who also pursued a career in film directing, and directed the movies Dönüş (1972), Azap (1973), Bodrum Hâkimi (1976), Yılanı Öldürseler (1981), and Uzaklarda Arama (2015).

With Kadir İnanır, she played in Kara Gözlüm, Unutulan Kadın, Dönüş, Gazi Kadın: Nene Hatun, Devlerin Aşkı, Bodrum Hakimi, Deprem, Dila Hanım, Cevriyem, Selvi Boylum Al Yazmalım, Aşk ve Nefret, Gönderilmemiş Mektuplar.

== Early life ==
Şoray was born in Eyüp, Istanbul, as the first child of a family of government officials. Her father was of Circassian (Kabardian) descent, while her maternal grandfather was a Turkish immigrant from Thessaloniki.

Her sister is singer and actress Nazan Şoray.

While she was studying at Fatih Girls High School as a daughter of one of the landowners in Karagümrük, she visits a set with actor Emel Yıldız who had starred in Panter Emel, and there with the encouragement of Türker İnanoğlu she decides to pursue a career in cinema. Türkân Şoray recounts her memory of starting her cinema career:

"A movie set came to our neighborhood before I entered the cinema industry. They were gonna shoot a set of the movie in our neighborhood. When I saw the actress starring in the movie, I said, 'What a beautiful woman.' That woman was Muhterem Nur. I was looking so confused and a man came up to me and asked 'You want to play in the movie?' I was scared and I just ran home. I learned later that this man was Memduh Ün. At that time I had escaped from the film set, but then the film sets became part of my life.”

== Career ==
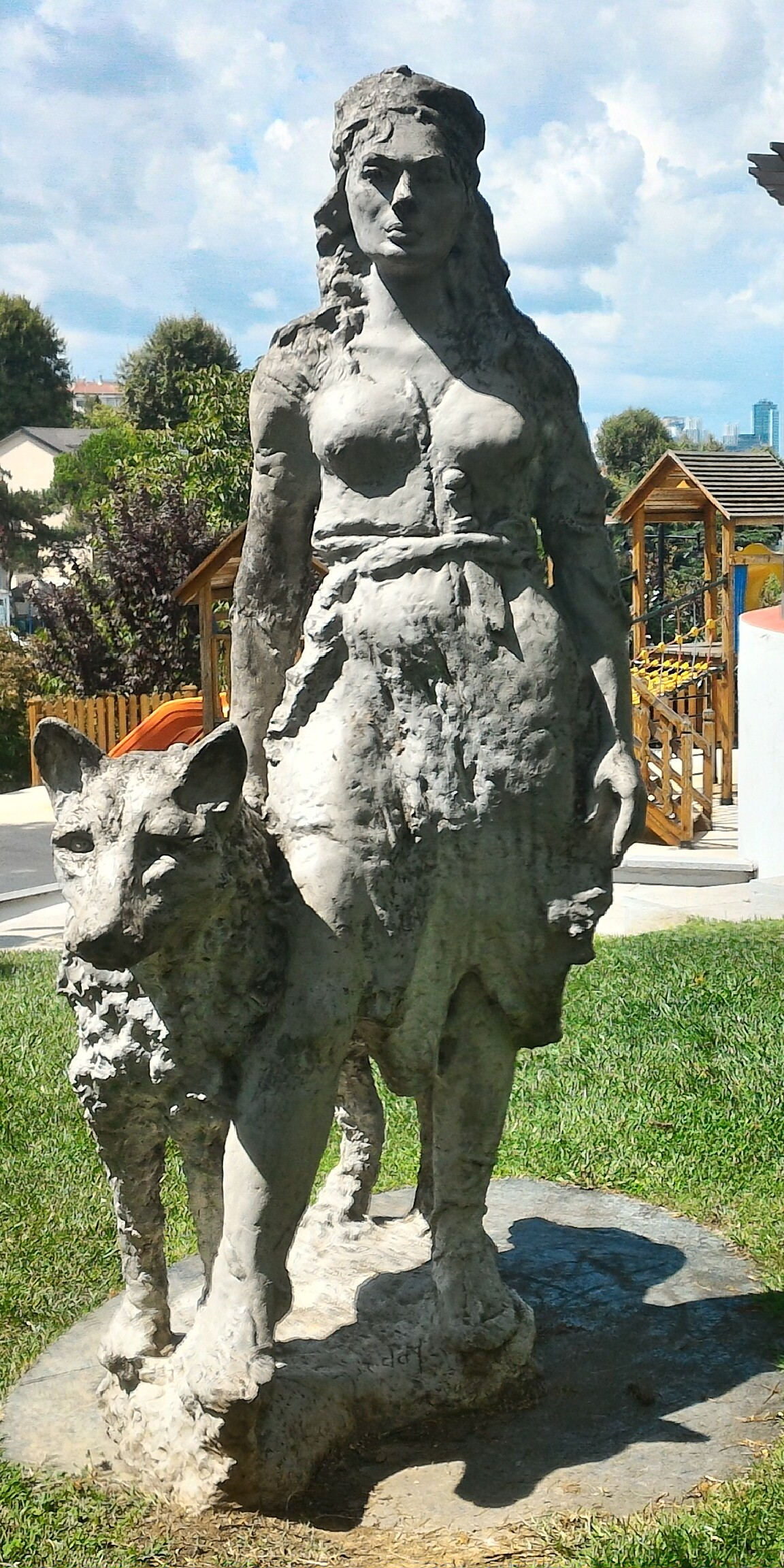
Gürdal Duyar's sculpture of Şoray at the Artists' Park in Akatlar, Istanbul

While studying at Fatih Kız Lisesi middle school, the homeowner's daughter of their house in Karagümrük later known as “Panter Emel” and Türkân Şoray went to the same film set. With incentive from Türker İnanoğlu, she made her first steps into Yeşilçam. Instead of Emel Yıldız marking the beginning of Türkan Şoray's career the 1960s “Köyde Bir Kız Sevdim” co-starred with Baki Tamer. Türkân Şoray recounts the memories of her introduction to cinema as such:

”Before entering cinema a film set arrived to our neighborhood. They were going to film a set of the movie in our neighborhood. When I saw the leading role actress I thought to myself ‘what a beautiful woman’. That woman was Muhterem Nur. As I was looking dumbfounded a man approached me and asked ‘Do you want to act in the movies too?’. I was scared and ran home immediately. I learned later on that, that man was Memduh Ün. Back then I ran from a movie set but later on movie sets became my life” recounts Türkân Şoray.

Şoray earned her first Golden Orange award in 1964 for her role as Nermin opposite Ekrem Bora in the movie Acı Hayat which was directed by Metin Erksan. In 1968, Şoray received her second Golden Orange award for her work in the movie Vesikalı Yarim, written by Safa Önal and based on Sait Faik Abasıyanık's "Menekşeli Vadi". At the Istanbul Film Festival, where the renewed copy of the film was republished many years later, Şoray said:

"It is a very miraculous thing for me to have worked with Lütfi Akad, a director whose placed won't be filled easily in Turkish cinema. 'Turkan, you play with your eyes,' he used to say. Lütfi Akad taught me to play with my eyes."

— Türkan Şoray, 2013 (Istanbul Film Festival)

=== Later career ===
She went on working with respectable directors in later years. One of them was Atıf Yılmaz, with whom she would work in both dramas and comedies. In the 1970s she also acted in films with a more realistic theme. She also directed four films in those years. Her most applauded films in the 1970s included Selvi Boylum Al Yazmalım, Hazal, Sultan, Dönüş and Baraj. In those films she was mostly accompanied by the famous Turkish actor Kadir İnanır.

== Awards ==
She won her first of many awards when she received the best actress prize at the 'Antalya Golden Orange Film Festival' for the film Acı Hayat (Bitter Life).

At the end of the 1960s, she was named one of the four greatest actresses of the Turkish cinema. She was highly applauded for her choices in film and her ability to act in a wide variety of roles. She starred in Vesikalı Yarim (My Licensed Love) for which she was awarded the Best Actress Award for the second time in the Antalya Film Festival.

In the 1980s she began portraying women with problems of female identity; Mine, Rumuz Goncagül (Nickname: Goncagül), On Kadın (Ten Women) etc. She won her third Best Actress Award from the Antalya Film Festival in 1987 with the film Hayallerim, Aşkım ve Sen(My Dreams, My Love and You), in which she portrays three different women, each of whom is a facet of Türkân Şoray herself.

Some of her awards are:

- Antalya Film Festival Best Actress Award
  - 1964-Acı Hayat
  - 1968-Vesikalı Yarim
  - 1987-Hayallerim, Aşkım ve Sen
  - 1994-Bir Aşk Uğruna
- Moscow Film Festival Grand Jury Prize
  - 1973-Dönüş (her directorial debut)
- Tashkent Film Festival Best Actress Award
  - 1978-Selvi Boylum Al Yazmalım
- Bastia Film Festival Best Actress Award
  - 1992-Soğuktu ve Yağmur Çiseliyordu
- 1996 Istanbul Film Festival, Honorary Cinema Award
- 1999 Rome Film Festival, Honorary Award

She is also a member of Eurasian Academy.

== Filmography ==
=== As an actress ===
Year	Film	Rol	Nots
1960	Köyde Bir Kız Sevdim		Debut role
1960	Aşk Rüzgârı	Nil	
1960	Güzeller Resmi Geçidi	Ayşe	
1961	Otobüs Yolcuları	Nevin	
1961	Melekler Şahidimdir	Zeynep	
1961	Siyah Melek (Zincirler Kırılırken)	Nesrin	
1961	Hatırla Sevgilim	Türkan	
1961	Utanmaz Adam	Sevim	
1961	Sevimli Haydut	Emine	
1961	Kaderin Önüne Geçilmez		
1961	Gönülden Gönüle	Nazan	
1961	Dikenli Gül	Gül	
1961	Aşk Ve Yumruk	Tülin	
1961	Afacan		
1961	Kardeş Uğruna		
1962	Biz de Arkadaş mıyız?	Nihal	
1962	Bitter Life	Nermin	
1962	Lekeli Kadın	Türkan	
1962	Billur Köşk		
1962	Bir Haydut Sevdim		
1962	Bardaktaki Adam		
1962	Aşk Yarışı	Zeynep	
1962	Zorlu Damatl	Gönül	
1962	Allah Seviniz Dedi	Arabistan prensesi	
1962	Kırmızı Karanfiller	Türkan	
1962	Dikmen Yıldızı	Yildiz	
1962	Ümitler Kırılınca	Oya	
1962	Ne Şeker Şey	Canan / Jale	Dual role
1963	Adanalı Tayfur		
1963	Köroğlu (Dağlar Kralı)	Türkan Sultan	
1963	Beni Osman Öldürdü	Türkan	
1963	Acı Aşk		
1963	Çapkın Kız	Suna	
1963	Küçük Beyin Kısmeti	Pervin	
1963	Sayın Bayan	Türkan Bayraktar	
1963	İki Kocalı Kadın	Sibel	
1963	Çalınan Aşk	Aysel / Günsel	Dual role
1963	Bütün Suçumuz Sevmek	Türkan	
1963	Badem Şekeri	Güner Pirinçeken	
1963	Genç Kızlar	Behlül / Eylül Servan	Dual role
1963	Ayşecik Canımın İçi	Elif	
1964	Adanalı Tayfur Kardeşler	Türkan	
1964	Mualla	Mualla	
1964	Fıstık Gibi Maşallah	Gülten	
1964	Kızgın Delikanlı	Avukat Sevil	
1964	Anasının Kuzusu	Türkan	
1964	Macera Kadını		
1964	Kader Kapıyı Çaldı	Leyla	
1964	Gözleri Ömre Bedel	Leyla	
1964	Gençlik Rüzgarı	Fatma Nur Erden	
1964	Bücür		
1964	Yılların Ardından	Berna	
1964	Bomba Gibi Kız	Leyla	
1964	Öksüz Kız		
1965	The Bread Seller Woman	Ayşe / Zehra / Leyla	Triple role
1965	Elveda Sevgilim	Türkan Kadiroğlu	
1965	Seven Kadın Unutmaz	Türkan	
1965	Komşunun Tavuğu	Türkan	
1965	Sürtük	Naciye	
1965	Siyah Gözler	Türkan	
1965	Hayatımın Kadını		
1965	Garip Bir İzdivaç	Zeynep Gökalp	
1965	Veda Busesi	Türkan	
1965	Vahşi Gelin	Ayşegül	
1966	Altın Küpeler	Aylin	
1966	Sana Layık Değilim	Türkan	
1966	Akşam Güneşi	Jülide	
1966	Çalıkuşu	Feride	
1966	Kenarın Dilberi	Şarkıcı	
1966	Meleklerin İntikamı	Türkan / Peri	Dual role
1966	Anaların Günahı	Sevim	
1966	Düğün Gecesi	Zeynep	
1966	Siyah Gül	Gül	
1966	Meyhanenin Gülü	Gül	
1966	Karanfilli Kadın	Meral	
1966	Günahkar Kadın	Türkan	
1966	Eli Maşalı	Nermin	
1966	El Kızı	Nazan	
1966	Çamaşırcı Güzeli		
1967	Bir Dağ Masalı	Lale	
1967	Ayrılsak da Beraberiz	Fatma	
1967	Ağlayan Kadın	Şükran / Leyla	Dual role
1967	Ana	Döndü	
1967	Sinekli Bakkal	Rabia	
1967	Ölümsüz Kadın	Serap/Nevin	Dual role
1967	Kelepçeli Melek	Nevin Erdem	
1967	Kara Duvaklı Gelin	Perihan	
1967	Her Zaman Kalbimdesin	Fatma	
1967	Tapılacak Kadın	Türkan Ay	
1968	Kahveci Güzeli	Nermin	
1968	Vesikalı Yarim	Sabiha	
1968	Abbase Sultan	Abbase	
1968	Ayşem	Ayşe	
1968	Kadın Severse	Leyla	
1968	Dünyanın En Güzel Kadını	Türkan Moray	
1968	Aşk Eski Bir Yalan	Handan	
1968	Artık Sevmeyeceğim	Nesrin / Leyla	Dual role
1968	Ağla Gözlerim	Leyla / Hicran	Dual role
1968	Kadın İntikamı	Handan	
1968	Kadın Değil, Baş Belası	Çengi Naciye	
1969	Fosforlu Cevriyem	Fosforlu Cevriye Necla	
1969	Bana Derler Fosforlu	Fosforlu	
1969	Aşk Mabudesi	Leyla	
1969	Buruk Acı	Ülker Demirel	
1969	Kölen Olayım	Azize	
1969	Sonbahar Rüzgarları	Nalan Akçam	
1969	Sana Dönmeyeceğim	Leyla Taner	
1969	Seninle Ölmek İstiyorum	Selma	
1969	Ateşli Çingene	Gelincik	
1969	Günah Bende mi?	Müvin	
1970	Bülbül Yuvası	Nerime	
1970	Buğulu Gözler	Canan	
1970	Arım, Balım, Peteğim	Zeynep	
1970	Kara Gözlüm l	Azize	
1970	Hayatım Sana Feda	Zeynep	
1970	Ağlayan Melek	Sabahat	
1970	Tatlı Meleğim	Leyla	
1970	Mazi Kalbimde Yaradır	Sükran, Türkan	
1970	Birleşen Yollar	Feyza	
1970	Merhamet	Zeynep	
1970	Herkesin Sevgilisi	Zeynep	
1970	Mağrur Kadın	Meral	
1971	Sevmek Ve Ölmek Zamanı	Emel Sayar	
1971	Gelin Çiçeği	Arzu	
1971	Ateş Parçası	Azize	
1971	Melek Mi Şeytan Mı? / Asrın Kadını	Nesrin	
1971	Mavi Eşarp	Leyla	
1971	Unutulan Kadın	Zeynep	
1971	Yedi Kocalı Hürmüz	Hürmüz	
1971	Güllü	Güllü/Gül	
1971	Bir Kadın Kayboldu	Selma	
1971	Gülüm, Dalım, Çiçeğim	Leyla Ergüvenç/Argo Şaziye	
1971	Bir Genç Kızın Romanı	Selma	
1972	Cemo	Cemo	
1972	Zulüm	Ayla	
1972	Dönüş	Gülcan	As director also
1972	Sisli Hatıralar	Dürrin Arbel	
1972	Vukuat Var	Güllü	
1972	Çile	Elif	
1973	Mahpus	Ümmühan	
1973	Güllü Geliyor Güllü	Güllü Fındıkoğlu	
1973	Azap	Elif	As director also
1973	Sultan Gelin	Sultan	
1973	Asiye Nasıl Kurtulur?	Asiye	
1973	Yalancı / Çok Yalnızım	Zeynep	
1973	Namus Borcu	Gurbet	
1973	Gazi Kadın / Nene Hatun	Zeynep	
1973	Dert Bende	Süreyya	
1974	Şenlik Var / Bal Kız	Zelis, Leyla Taner	
1974	Yüreğimde Yare Var	Nurten	
1974	Çılgınlar	Selma, Cavidan	
1974	Açlık	Meryem	
1975	Acele Koca Aranıyor	Melike	
1976	Deprem	Zeynep	
1976	Bodrum Hakimi	Nevin	
1976	Devlerin Aşkı	Türkan/Manikürcü Türkan	
1977	Selvi Boylum, Al Yazmalım	Asya	
1977	Baraj	Aysel	
1977	Dila Hanım	Dila Hanim	
1978	Sultan	Sultan	
1978	Bir Aşk Masalı	Banu	
1978	Cevriyem	Cevriye	
1978	Ferhat ile Şirin	Mehmene Banu	
1978	Tatlı Nigar	Tatli Nigar	
1979	Hazal	Hazal	
1979	Küskün Çiçek	Zeynep	
1981	Yılanı Öldürseler	Esme	
1982	Seni Kalbime Gömdüm	Eylülm	
1983	Metres	Feride	
1983	Seni Seviyorum	Aygül/Selma	
1983	Mine	Mine	
1984	Bir Sevgi İstiyorum	Melike	
1985	Körebe	Meral	
1985	Bir Kadın Bir Hayat	Nuran	
1987	Hayallerim, Aşkım Ve Sen	Derya Altınay	
1987	Gramofon Avrat	Cemile	
1987	On Kadın	Füsun	
1987	Rumuz Goncagül	Gülsün	
1988	Ada	Eser	
1989	Ölü Bir Deniz	Yüksel	
1990	Berdel	Hanim	
1990	Soğuktu Ve Yağmur Çiseliyordu	Leyla	
1991	Menekşe Koyu	Neriman	
1993	Şahmaran	Sultan	
1993	Tatlı Betüş	Betül "Betüs"	
1994	Bir Aşk Uğruna	Selma	
1995	Yer Çekimli Aşklar	Mehpare	
1996	Gözlerinde Son Gece	Selma	
1997	Nihavend Mucize	Suzan	
1998	İkinci Bahar	Hanım	
2001	Tatlı Hayat	Sevinc Yildirim	
2002	Gönderilmemiş Mektuplar	Gülfem	
2004	Mürüvvetsiz Mürüvvet	Mürevvet	
2006	Cemile	Cemile	
2006	Ayın Yıldızı	Karagümrüklü Karakız	
2006	Aşk Beklemez	Suna Serteri	
2006	Hayatımın Kadınısın	Asuman Karaca	
2007	Suna	Suna	
2008	Vurgun	Cevher	
2009	Altın Kızlar	İnciye	
2012	Bir Zamanlar Osmanli: Kiyam	Hatice Sultan	

=== As a director ===
- Dönüş – 1972
- Azap – 1973
- Bodrum Hakimi – 1976
- Yılanı Öldürseler – 1981 (with Şerif Gören)
- Uzaklarda Arama – 2015

== Music albums ==
- Türkan Şoray Söylüyor (2015)

== Books ==
- "Sinemam ve Ben" (autobiography), Türkan Şoray, NTV Yayınları, 2012, İstanbul.

== Books about her ==
- "Türkân Şoray, Bir Yıldız Böyle Doğdu" (documentary novel), Agah Özgüç, Göl publications, 1974, Istanbul.
- "Sümbül Sokağın Tutsak Kadını" (biography), Atilla Dorsay, Remzi Bookstore, 1997, Istanbul. ISBN 975-14-0612-9
- "Türkân Şoray" (biography), Agah Özgüç, Açıkşehir publications, 2001, Istanbul. ISBN 975-93383-00
- "Türkân Şoray ile Yüz Yüze", Feridun Andaç, Drahma publications, 2010, Istanbul.
- "50 Yıllık Aşk - Türkan Şoray", Ercan Akarsu, Esen Books, 2014, Istanbul. ISBN 978-605-4609-40-6
- "Sinema Emekçisi - Türkan Şoray", Ercan Akarsu, Esen Books, 2015, Istanbul. ISBN 978-605-4609-67-3

== See also ==
- Nazan Şoray
- Nazan Saatci
