= Seyfi =

Seyfi is both a Turkish surname and a given name. Notable people with the name include:

== Given name ==
- Seyfi Arkan (1903–1966), Turkish architect
- Seyfi Dursunoğlu (1932–2020), Turkish showman
- Seyfi Düzgören (1880–1948), Turkish Army general
- Seyfi Havaeri (1920–2009), Turkish actor, screenwriter and film director
- Seyfi Öztürk (1927–2002), Turkish lawyer and politician

== Surname ==
- Ali Rıza Seyfi (1879–1958), Turkish writer, historian and poet
- Tim Seyfi (born 1971), Turkish-German actor

== Ship ==
- Seyfi (sunk on 25–26 May 1877), Turkish river monitor.
