= Drakula İstanbul'da =

1953 film by Mehmet Muhtar

- Theatrical release poster
- Directed by: Mehmet Muhtar
- Screenplay by: Turgut Demirag, Umit Deniz, Mehmet Muhtar
- Based on: based on Kazıklı Voyvoda, a novel by Ali Riza Seyfi
- Starring: Atıf Kaptan; Annie Ball; Bülent Oran; Ayfer Feray; Cahit Irgat; Münir Ceyhan; Sami Ayanoğlu; Talat Artemel; Suavi Tedü; Sadri Alışık; Aziz Basmacı; Heyecan Başaran; Saziye Moral; Uğur Boran; Berrin Aydan; Müfit Kiper; Kani Kıpçak; Resit Gürzap; Cahide Sonku; Cahit Irgat; Kemal Ergüvenç; Muzaffer Tema; Ayhan Işık; Settar Körmükçü; Münir Özkul; Münir Nurettin Selçuk; Ercüment Behzat Lav; Cüneyt Gökçer
- Production company: And Films
- Release date: 1953
- Running time: 1 hour, 43 minutes
- Country: Turkey
- Language: Turkish

Drakula İstanbul'da (Dracula in Istanbul) is a Turkish 1953 film version of Bram Stoker's original novel Dracula.

The screenplay was based on a 1928 novel by Ali Riza Seyfi called Kazıklı Voyvoda (Impaler Voivode), and is more or less a translation of Stoker's novel, but there is no Renfield character and Güzin, the "Mina Harker" character, is a showgirl given to performing in revealing outfits. Drakula/Dracula is played by balding Atif Kaptan. Both the novel and the film make an explicit connection with the historical Vlad the Impaler, the Prince and three-time Voivode of Wallachia. This is the first film to portray Dracula with fangs.

== Plot ==
The year is 1953. Azmi, a lawyer, travels to Romania to close a real estate transaction with Count Dracula. Azmi stops at an inn in Bistritz, where he meets fearful, superstitious people. They are frightened at Dracula's name and because it is the 14th of the month, a day of ill omen. A woman warns him not to go, but Azmi says he carries an amulet for protection. The hotel car only takes Azmi so far, and then Dracula's own carriage picks him up. The Count himself, incognito, drives the carriage to the castle. He greets Azmi, helping him with his bags and showing him to his room. Dracula makes excuses as to the absence of his servants and why he does not plan to eat dinner. Azmi enjoys a supper in which the Count does not join him. Dracula tells Azmi about Transylvanian history- including his "ancestor" Vlad The Impaler. Wolves howl outside, and the Count remarks: “Listen to them— the children of the night! They sing beautiful song.”

A hunchbacked servant suddenly appears and gives Azmi a key to the library and warns him not to sleep there. In the library, the Count tells Azmi to write three letters home, in which he is to say that he has already left Transylvania. Azmi and Dracula discuss the sale of the house in Istanbul. Azmi cuts his thumb. The sight of blood excites the Count. Azmi explores the castle and falls asleep in one of the rooms, and a vampire woman attacks him. The Count stops the attack, giving the woman a baby to feed on. Azmi awakes as if from a nightmare, and Dracula helps him return to his room. Azmi finds a book about vampires in the library-but all the pages on how to destroy them are ripped off. A woman comes to the castle pleading for the return of her child. Wolves kill her. Azmi finds a vault in which the Count reposes in a coffin-like box and tries to kill the Count with a shovel but fails. Dracula later tries to attack Azmi, but his servant intervenes, and Dracula kills him. A rooster crows, and Dracula disappears. Next night, looking out a window, Azmi sees Dracula climb head-first down the outer wall. Azmi returns to the vault in which the Count reposes in his box and again tries to kill the Count with a shovel, but fails. He also empties a revolver into the Count, but gunshots do not harm him. Azmi then runs away.

Back in Turkey, Azmi's wife Güzin receives one of his letters. She frets because it is the first she has heard from him in ten days. Güzin spends her time with her best friend, Sadan. Sadan's mother, who has a heart condition, says Sadan has been ill and walking in her sleep lately, though Sadan seems happy as she recently became engaged to Turan. Güzin and Sadan go to the seashore, and while taking a walk, they meet four men carrying a coffin-like box, which they say is full of dirt from Romania. The men say that two other men hired to move the boxes of earth disappeared in transit. That night Sadan walks in her sleep. Güzin follows her to the seashore and sees her near the foot of a seaside staircase, being preyed upon by Dracula, who disappears. Güzin walks Sadan back to her room. Sadan begins to suffer from a mysterious illness that leaves her pale and weak. Her illness baffles Dr. Akif, and Dr. Nuri is called to examine Sadan, noticing that she has two tiny wounds on her throat. Güzin meanwhile learns that Azmi is being nursed back to health in a hospital in Edirne. She goes to bring him home. Dr. Nuri recommends blood transfusions for Sadan, and also places garlic in her room and prepares a wreath of it for her to wear in her sleep. He warns that her windows should not be opened at night. That night, Sadan's mother removes the necklace, and The Count breaks the window to Sadan's room and attacks her. Sadan's mother, who is still in the room at the time, dies of a heart attack. Azmi and Güzin return from Edirne, but they are too late. Sadan is on her deathbed, the marks from her neck have vanished and her teeth appear longer and sharper. She speaks with strange seductiveness to Turan, but Dr. Nuri prevents Turan from kissing her. Sadan dies, is buried and then rises as a vampire, who preys on children. Dr. Nuri, Azmi, Güzin, Dr. Akif, and Turan agree to join forces against the Count. Dr. Nuri tells the others of his suspicions about Dracula, and about his limitations: he retreats from garlic, and he can be killed by a stake through the heart or by decapitation. Dr. Nuri also reveals that the wounds in the children's throats weren't made in the same way as Sadan's wounds, but were made by Sadan herself. Dr. Nuri leads Dr. Akif, Azmi, and Turan to the graveyard by night. Inside the tomb, Sadan's coffin is empty.

Meanwhile, Dracula turns his attention to Güzin, entering her home. Azmi returns in time to run him off with a garlic clove. The next day, Dr. Nuri and the others return to the graveyard. They discover that Sadan has returned to her grave. That night, Dr. Nuri returns to the graveyard with Dr. Akif, Azmi, and Turan, and wait for Sadan. She returns to the tomb carrying a child, whom she abandons when Dr. Nuri and the others confront her. After trying to sweet-talk Turan, she recoils from a garlic clove and is captured. The men then return Sadan to her grave, and Turan stakes her. Dr. Nuri, Azmi, Turan and Dr. Akif infiltrate Dracula's house and find the boxes. They place garlic in them and then lie waiting for the Count's return. Güzin, a showgirl, is performing that night and has to return to the musical hall to fetch her garlic wreath she left there and is detained by Dracula, who waited for her. Dracula states his admiration for her and desire to drink her drop by drop, puts her into a trance, and makes her dance for him.

Azmi bursts in upon this scene, right when Dracula is about to bite Güzin. He confronts the Count with a garlic clove. Dracula flees. Azmi pursues Dracula to the cemetery and finds him concealed in a grave. He stakes Dracula through the heart. After that, Azmi returns home to his wife. He announces that he's sick of garlic and refuses to keep it in their home anymore, even for cooking.

== Cast ==
- Atif Kaptan as Count Dracula
- Annie Ball as Güzin
- Bülent Oran as Azmi
- Cahit Irgat as Turan
- Ayfer Feray as Sadan
- Kemal Emin Bara as Dr.Nuri
- Münir Ceyhan as Dr.Akif
- Ayhan Işık as Nazim
- Gülistan Güzey as Ayten
- Muzaffer Tema as Halil
- Pola Morelli as Perihan
- Talat Artemel as Sevket
- Nese Yulaç as Nezahat
- Settar Körmükçü as Kamil
- Nubar Terziyan as Mahmut
- Muazzez Arçay as Zehra
- Temel Karamahmut as Polis Sefi
- Renan Fosforoglu]
- Sadettin Erbil as Komiser
- Riza Tüzün as Doktor
- Kerim Pamukoglu
- Mümtaz Alpaslan
- Vedat Örfi Bengü as Ak Mustafa

== Legacy ==
This film adaptation of Dracula is notable for several things: it is the first sound screen version that shows Dracula with fangs, the first screen version that shows him scaling down the walls, the first screen version where he offers a newborn baby to his female vampire and the first screen version that directly links Count Dracula and Vlad the Impaler.

== See also ==
- Vampire films
