= 2nd Antalya Golden Orange Film Festival =

1965 Turkish film festival

- Official Festival Poster
- Location: Antalya, Turkey
- Awards: Golden Orange
- Festival date: May 24-June 4, 1965
- Website: http://www.aksav.org.tr/en/

Antalya Film Festival
- 3rd 1st

The 2nd Antalya Golden Orange Film Festival (Turkish: 2. Antalya Altın Portakal Film Festivali) was held from May 24 to June 4, 1965, in Antalya, Turkey. Golden Oranges were awarded in thirteen categories to the seven Turkish films made in the preceding year which were selected to compete in the festival's National Feature Film Competition.

== National Feature Film Competition ==
Jury Members
Nejat Duru
Nurhan Nur
Sabahattin Ataker
Davut Ergün
Mehmet Dinler
Dr. Ak
Mrs. Tolunay
Mrs. Turgay
Dr. Burhanettin Onat

=== Golden Orange Awards ===
The National Feature Film Competition Jury, headed by Nejat Duru, awarded Golden Oranges in twelve categories.

- 1st Best Film: Love and Hate (Turkish: Aşk Ve Kin) directed by Turgut Demirağ
- 2nd Best Film: Keshanli Ali's Epic (Turkish: Keşanlı Ali Destanı) directed by Atıf Yılmaz
- 3rd Best Film: Those Awaking in the Dark (Turkish: Karanlıkta Uyananlar) directed by Ertem Göreç
- Best Director: Atıf Yılmaz for Keshanli Ali's Epic (Turkish: Keşanlı Ali Destanı)
- Best Screenplay: Vedat Türkali for Those Awaking in the Dark (Turkish: Karanlıkta Uyananlar)
- Best Cinematography: Gani Turanlı for Love and Hate (Turkish: Aşk Ve Kin)
- Best Original Music: Nedim Otyam for Those Awaking in the Dark (Turkish: Karanlıkta Uyananlar)
- Best Actress: Fatma Girik for Keshanli Ali's Epic (Turkish: Keşanlı Ali Destanı)
- Best Actor: Fikret Hakan for Keshanli Ali's Epic (Turkish: Keşanlı Ali Destanı)
- Best Supporting Actress: Aliye Rona for We Are All Brothers and Sisters (Turkish: Hepimiz Kardeşiz)
- Best Supporting Actor: Erol Taş for Beyond the Walls (Turkish: Duvarların Ötesi)
- Best Studio:Acar Film Studio (Turkish: Acar Film Stüdyosu)

=== Official Selection ===
Six Turkish films made in the preceding year were selected to compete in the festival's National Feature Film Competition.

- Love and Hate (Turkish: Aşk Ve Kin) directed by Turgut Demirağ
- Keshanli Ali's Epic (Turkish: Keşanlı Ali Destanı) directed by Atıf Yılmaz
- Those Awaking in the Dark (Turkish: Karanlıkta Uyananlar) directed by Ertem Göreç
- We Are All Brothers and Sisters (Turkish: Hepimiz Kardeşiz) directed by Ülkü Erakalın
- Beyond the Walls (Turkish: Duvarların Ötesi) directed by Orhan Elmas
- Erkek Ali directed by Atıf Yılmaz
- Girls of Istanbul (Turkish: İstanbul'un Kızları) directed by Halit Refiğ

== National Short Film Competition ==
=== Golden Orange Awards ===
- Best Short Film: A Drop of Water's Story (Turkish: Bir Damla Suyun Hikâyesi) directed by Behlül Dal

== See also ==
- 1965 in film
