= Bitter Life =

Bitter Life refers to:

- Bitter Life (TV series), Turkish TV series
- Bitter Life (film), 1962 Turkish film
