= Lale Oraloğlu =

Turkish actress and screenwriter

- Born: 15 August 1924; İzmir, Turkey
- Died: 15 January 2007 (aged 82); Istanbul, Turkey
- Occupations: Actress, screenwriter
- Years active: 1952–2006
- Father: Lebib Karan

Lale Oraloğlu (15 August 1924 – 15 January 2007) was a Turkish television and film actress and screenwriter. She appeared in 28 films and TV shows between 1952 and 2006. She starred in the film The Broken Pots, which was entered into the 11th Berlin International Film Festival. Her father was the Tatar-born scientist-writer Lebib Karan. (1887-1964).

== Selected filmography ==
- The Broken Pots (1960)
