= Haldun Dormen =

Turkish actor and film director (1928–2026)

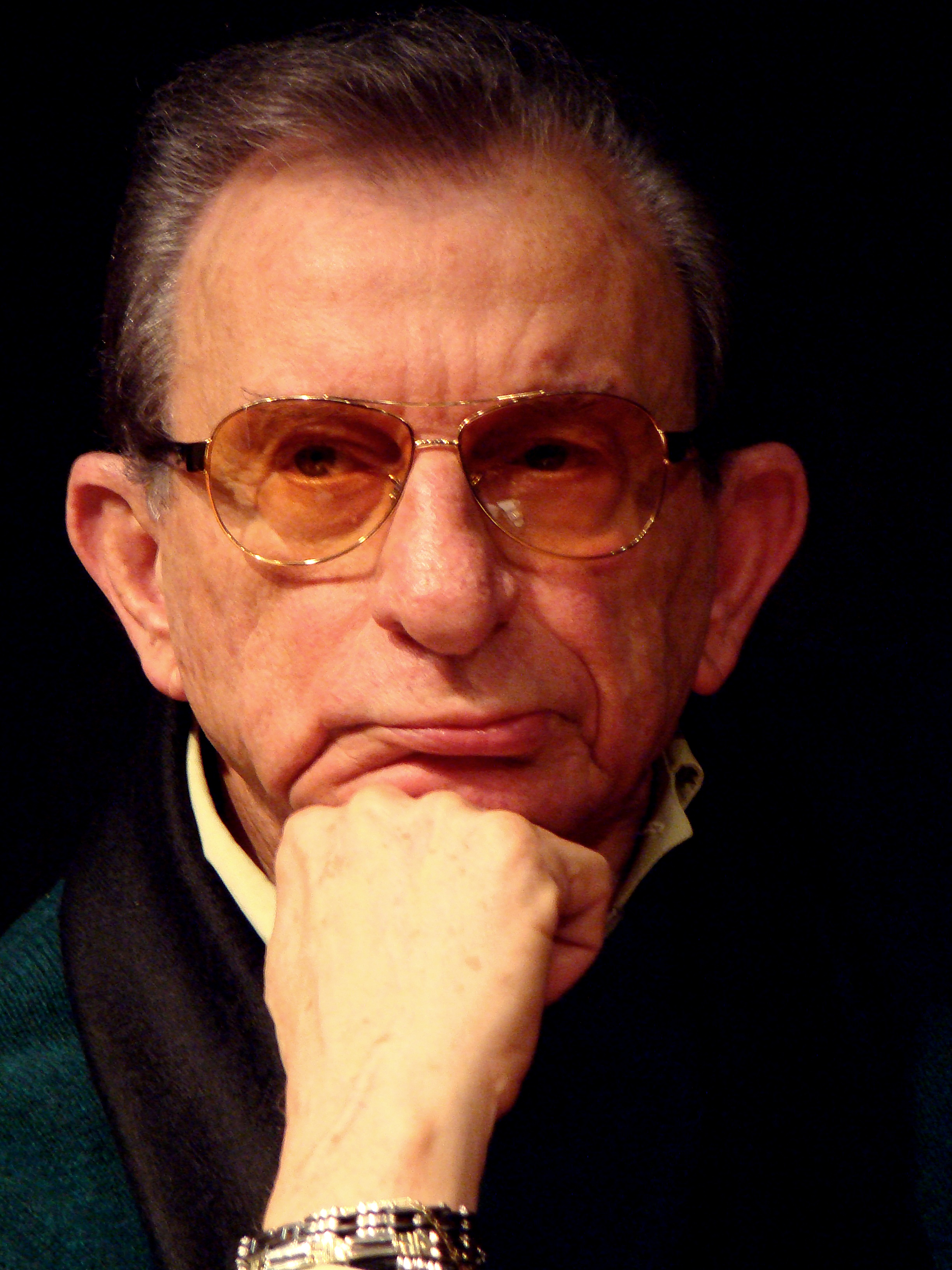
- Born: Ahmet Haldun; 5 April 1928; Mersin, Turkey
- Died: 21 January 2026 (aged 97); Istanbul, Turkey
- Burial place: Edirnekapı Martyr's Cemetery, Istanbul
- Education: Galatasaray High School; Robert College; Yale University (BA); Yale School of Drama (MFA)
- Occupations: Actor; film director
- Spouse: Betül Mardin (m. 1959; div. 1967)
- Children: 1
- Relatives: Ayşe Arman (daughter-in-law)
- Awards: Golden Orange Award for Best Screenplay (1966)

Ahmet Haldun Dormen (5 April 1928 – 21 January 2026) was a Turkish film, television and stag actor and film director. Dormen was of Turkish Cypriot descent.

== Life and career ==
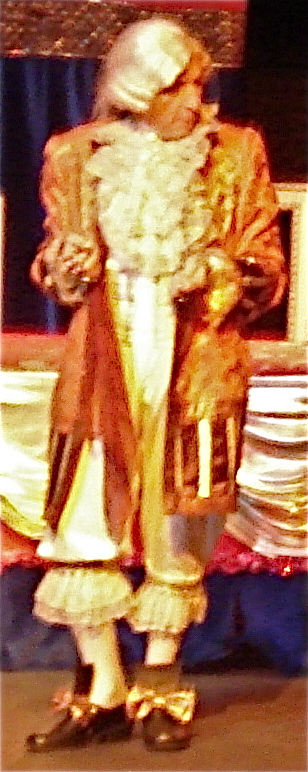
Haldun Dormen in The Bourgeois Gentleman, playing the role of Monsieur Jourdain

Dormen was born on 5 April 1928. His father Sait Ömer Bey was a Cypriot businessman, while his mother Nimet Rüştü Hanım was the daughter of a pasha from Istanbul. His family settled in Şişli before Dormen's first birthday. He had his first acting experience on stage as a junior high school student at the Galatasaray High School, portraying a character in a play titled Demirbank. He finished his education at the Robert College. At the age of eight, his left foot was injured due to an accident.

He studied at Yale University, where he earned a Bachelor of Arts degree and later completed a Master of Fine Arts at the Yale School of Drama. For two years, he worked as an actor and director in various theaters in the United States. He performed in four plays in Pasadena Playhouse in Hollywood. When he returned to Istanbul, he entered the Küçük Sahne stage under the direction of Muhsin Ertuğrul and had his first role in front of the Turkish audience with the play Cinayet Var.

On the night of 22 August 1955, he performed in the first play organized by the Dormen Theater in the Süreyya Cinema. He continued to appear in the plays at the Küçük Sahne Theater after receiving an offer by them in September 1957. In 1957, he founded the Dormen Theater with the comedy play Papaz Kaçtı. He gave roles to dozens of artists in his plays, including Erol Günaydın, Altan Erbulak, Metin Serezli, Nisa Serezli, Erol Keskin, İzzet Günay, Yılmaz Köksal, and Ayfer Feray. The party had their golden period between the years 1957–1972. In 1961, he brought the first Western-themed musical on stage in Turkey under the title Street Girl İrma. Gülriz Sururi first became known in Turkey with her role as İrma in this play. In 1962, he moved to the historical Ses Theater in Beyoğlu, and continued his works there for 10 years.

Dormen later directed two cinematic movies: Bozuk Düzen and Güzel Bir Gün İçin. Alongside the Dormen Theater squad, the likes of Belgin Doruk, Ekrem Bora, Nurhan Nur, Müşfik Kenter, and Nedret Güvenç appeared in these movies. The two movies received seven awards in total at the Golden Orange Film Festival in 1966 and 1967, but they weren't commercially successful in the box office.

In 1972, he closed his theater and turned to television, writing and teaching. He then appeared in numerous TV programs such as Unutulanlar, Anılarla Söyleşi, Kamera Arkası, Dadı, and Popstar Türkiye. He then joined Milliyet as a journalist and contributed to the column Variations. His career in Milliyet lasted for eight years.

In 1981, he met Egemen Bostancı. Later, he wrote and directed the musicals Hisseli Harikalar Kumpanyası and Şen Sazın Bülbülleri. In 1984, with Egemen Bostancı's insistence, he re-established the Dormen Theater again and the organization continued to operate for 17 years. In the same years, he brought The Luxurious Life back to stage at the Istanbul City Theatres with Gencay Gürün serving as the producer. He later directed The Luxurious Life for the İzmir and Mersin Opera and the Eskişehir City Theater.

In 2002, he closed his theater due to economic reasons but continued to act and directed in various theaters.

Haldun Dormen wrote more than nine books, including four biographies ("Sürç-ü Lisan Ettikse", "Antrakt", "İkinci Perde", "Nerede Kalmıştık"), and two plays. His play Kantocu, which sheds light on the experiences of female stage artists during the foundation years of the Republic, was staged in Istanbul, Eskişehir, and Ankara.

Dormen married Betül Mardin, a world-renowned figure in public relations in 1959, and a son named Ömer was born from this marriage that lasted eight years.

Dormen, as the art consultant of the Sahne Tozu Theater in İzmir, staged various plays in their salon. (Sahne Tozu Theater Haldun Dormen Stage in İzmir). He also gave musical lessons at the Sahne Tozu Theater Nişantaşı Academy.

Dormen died at a hospital in Istanbul, where he was treated, on 21 January 2026, at the age of 97. He was buried at the Edirnekapı Martyr's Cemetery following a memorial ceremony at the Harbiye Muhsin Ertuğrul Stage and the religious service at the Teşvikiye Mosque.

== Filmography ==
Actor

- Güzel Bir Gün İçin (1965)
- Hüdaverdi - Pırtık (1971)
- Bizimkiler (1971)
- Yorgun Savaşçı (1979)
- Gırgıriye (1981)
- Dadı (TV series) (2001)
- Yeşil Işık (2002)
- Sayın Bakanım (TV series) (2004)
- Vuurzee (Dutch TV series) (2005 - 2006/2009)
- Unutulmayanlar (2006)

Director

- Güzel Bir Gün İçin (1965)
- Bozuk Düzen (1966)

Producer

- Güzel Bir Gün İçin (1965)
- Bozuk Düzen (1966)

Awards
| Preceded by Vedat Türkali | Golden Orange Award for Best Screenplay; 1966 for Bozuk Düzen shared with Erol Keskin | Succeeded by Erol Günaydın-Erol Keskin |
