= Nazan =

Nazan is a Turkish feminine given name and may refer to:

- Nazan Akın (born 1983), Turkish Paralympic judoka
- Nazan Bekiroğlu (born 1957), Turkish novelist
- Nazan Bulut (born 1973), Turkish women's footballer and teacher
- Nazan Eckes (born 1976), Turkish-German television personality
- Nazan Kesal (born 1957), Turkish actress
- Nazan Maksudyan (born 1977), historian and academic
- Nazan Öncel (born 1956), Turkish singer
- Nazan Saatci (born 1958), Turkish actress and writer
- Nazan Şoray (born 1954), Turkish singer and actress
