= Aslan Pençesi =

- Directed by: Memduh Ün
- Written by: Halit Refiğ
- Starring: Ayhan Işık, Sevinç Pekin and Turgut Özatay
- Release date: 1966
- Country: Turkey
- Language: Turkish

Aslan Pençesi is a 1966 Turkish crime film, directed by Memduh Ün and starring Ayhan Işık, Sevinç Pekin and Turgut Özatay. It was written by Halit Refiğ.
