= Olcay =

- Gender: Male and Female

Origin
- Language: Turkish
- Meaning: "Luck", "Lucky"

Other names
- Related names: Olcayto

Olcay is a common unisex Turkish given name. In Turkish, "Olcay" means "Luck", and/or "Lucky". It is also used as a surname.

People named Olcay include:

== Given name ==
=== First name ===
==== Female ====
- Olcay Çakır (born 1993), Turkish basketball player
- Olcay Gulsen (born 1980), Dutch fashion designer
- Olcay Neyzi (1927–2022), Turkish doctor

==== Male ====
- Olcay Çetinkaya (born 1979), Turkish football player
- Olcay Gür (born 1991), Liechtenstein football player
- Olcay Senoglu (born 1984), Danish football player
- Olcay Şahan (born 1987), Turkish football player
- Olcay Turhan (born 1988), German football player

=== Middle name ===
- Ayşe Olcay Tiryaki (1955–2008), a Turkish physician

== Surname ==
- Kenan Olcay (913–date of death unknown), Turkish wrestler
- John Olcay (1940–2014), international financier
- Osman Esim Olcay (1924–2010), Turkish diplomat
- Zuhal Olcay (born 1957), Turkish actress and singer
