= Turgut Özatay =

Turkish actor

- Born: 30 December 1927; Adana , Turkey
- Died: 26 June 2002 (aged 74); Istanbul, Turkey
- Resting place: Feriköy Cemetery, Istanbul
- Occupation: Actor
- Years active: 1943–2000

Turgut Özatay (30 December 1927 – 26 June 2002) was a Turkish film actor. He appeared in 225 films between 1952 and 1998. He starred in the film The Broken Pots, which was entered into the 11th Berlin International Film Festival.

== Filmography ==
- 1945: Yayla Kartalı
- 1946: Domaniç Yolcusu Unutulan Sır
- 1946: Kızılırmak Karakoyun
- 1948: Damga
- 1950: Çete
- 1950: Üçüncü Selim'inGözdesi
- 1951: Evli Mi Bekar Mı
- 1951: Barbaros Hayreddin Paşa
- 1951: Lale Devri
- 1951: Vatan ve Namık Kemal
- 1951: istanbul'un Fethi
- 1952: Yavuz Sultan Selim Ağlıyor
- 1953: Kahraman Denizciler
- 1953: Yanık Efe
- 1954: Şaban Karaman'ın Koyunu
- 1954: Yaban Kız
- 1955: Görmeyen Gözler
- 1955: Panayırdaki Cinayet
- 1955: Sönen Gözler
- 1956: Aşk Ve Kumar
- 1956: Hayat Sokaklarında
- 1956: İntikam Alevi
- 1956: Katibim
- 1956: Piç / Kahpe Dünya
- 1957: Ak Altın
- 1957: Bir Avuç Toprak
- 1957: Hata / Bırakın Ağlayım
- 1957: Kara Talih
- 1958: Ateş Rıza
- 1958: Cilalı İbo Yıldızlar Arasında
- 1958: Murada Ereceğiz
- 1958: Dokuz Dağın Efesi: Çakıcı Geliyor
- 1959: Yalnızlar Rıhtımı
- 1959: Gönül Kimi Severse
- 1959: Onun Süvarisi
- 1959: Şehvet Uçurumu
- 1960: Kırık Çanaklar
- 1960: Suçlu
- 1960: Aşk Rüzgarı
- 1960: Ateşten Damla
- 1960: Ayşecik
- 1960: Can Mustafa
- 1960: Yangın Var
- 1961: Afacan
- 1961: Kardeş Uğruna
- 1961: Acar Kardeşler
- 1961: Biz İnsan Değil Miyiz
- 1961: Cambaz Kızın Aşkı
- 1961: Çılgın Aşk
- 1961: Doğmadan Ölenler
- 1961: Genç Osman
- 1961: Hancı
- 1961: Kadın Asla Unutmaz
- 1961: Külkedisi
- 1962: Kanun Der Ki
- 1962: Kayıp Kız Ayla
- 1962: Öldüren Bahar
- 1962: Yavaş Yürü Yabancı
- 1963: Aşk ve Kin - Zihni Yalın
- 1963: Bu Adam Kim ?
- 1963: Büyük Yemin
- 1963: Cinayet Gecesi
- 1963: İki Vatanlı Kadın
- 1963: Kamil Abi
- 1963: Menekşe Gözler
- 1963: Ölüm Bizi Ayıramaz
- 1963: Ölüme Çeyrek Var
- 1963: Sabahsız Geceler
- 1963: Yolcu
- 1964: Halime'den Mektup Var
- 1964: Devlet Kuşu
- 1964: Günah Bende Mi
- 1964: Hızlı Yaşayanlar
- 1964: İsimsiz Kahramanlar
- 1964: İstanbul Sokaklarında
- 1964: Izdırap Çocukları
- 1964: Meyhaneci / Can Düşmanı
- 1964: Nem Alacak Felek Benim
- 1964: Yüz Karası
- 1965: Altın Şehir
- 1965: Artık Düşman Değiliz
- 1965: Babasız Yaşayamam
- 1965: Canın Cehenneme
- 1965: Melek Yüzlü Caniler
- 1965: Karaoğlan Altay'dan Gelen Yiğit
- 1965: Satılık Kalp
- 1966: Kumarbazın İntikamı
- 1966: Aslan Pençesi
- 1966: Aşk Mücadelesi
- 1966: Avare Kız
- 1966: Bar Kızı
- 1966: Bir Ateşim Yanarım
- 1966: Bitmeyen Çile
- 1966: Dişi Kartal
- 1966: Dövüşmek Şart Oldu
- 1966: İdam Mahkûmu
- 1966: Namus Kanla Yazılır
- 1966: Ölüm Temizler
- 1966: Şeref Kavgası
- 1966: Sırat Köprüsü
- 1966: Vur Emri -
- 1966: Yosma
- 1966: Zorba
- 1966: Karaoğlan Camoka'nın Intikamı
- 1967 Aşkların En Güzeli
- 1967: Alpaslan'ın Fedaisi Alpago
- 1967: Namus Borcu
- 1967: Acı Türkü
- 1967: Anjelik Osmanlı Saraylarında
- 1967: Çıldırtan Arzu - Adem ile Havva
- 1967: Eceline Susayanlar
- 1967: Felaket Kuşu
- 1967: Harun Reşid'ın Gözdesi
- 1967: İdam Günü
- 1967: Kırbaç Altında
- 1967: Osmanlı Kabadayısı
- 1967: Sen Benimsin
- 1967: Silahlı Paşazade
- 1967: Üç Sevdalı Kız
- 1967: Üvey Ana
- 1967: Yağmur Çiselerken
- 1967: Yaralı Kuş / Mazideki Yıllarım
- 1967: Yayla Kızı Yıldız
- 1967: Yılmayan Adam
- 1968: Cesur Yabancı
- 1968: Abbase Sultan
- 1968: Acı İnanç
- 1968: Affedilmeyen Suç
- 1968: Alnımın Kara Yazısı
- 1968: Atlı Karınca Dönüyor
- 1968: Cehennemde Boş Yer Yok
- 1968: Erikler Çiçek Açtı
- 1968: İngiliz Kemalin Oğlu
- 1968: Kafkas Kartalı
- 1968: Kanlı Nigar
- 1968: Parmaksız Salih
- 1968: Yara
- 1968: Yedi Adım Sonra
- 1969: Asi Kabadayı
- 1969: Aşk Bu Değil
- 1969: Çile
- 1969: Dağlar Şahini
- 1969: Deli Murat
- 1969: Gel Desen Gelemem Ki
- 1969: Gülnaz Sultan
- 1969: Kadın Paylaşılmaz
- 1969: Karaoğlan'ın Kardeşi Sargan
- 1969: Korkunç Takip
- 1969: Mısır'dan Gelen Gelin
- 1969: Vatansızlar
- 1969: Yaşamak Hakkımdır
- 1969: Yumurcak
- 1969: Yuvasızlar
- 1969: Zalimin Zulmü Varsa
- 1969: Zorro Dişi Fantoma'ya Karşı
- 1970: Beleşçi Murat
- 1970: Deliormanlı
- 1970: Fatoş Talihsiz Yavru
- 1970: Günahımı Çekeceksin
- 1970: Hayatımı Mahveden Kadın
- 1970: Hoş Memo
- 1970: Kaderin Pençesinde
- 1970: Kıskanırım Seni
- 1970: Şampiyon
- 1970: Tatlı Hayal
- 1970: Yeşil Kurbağalar
- 1970: Zindandan Gelen Mektup
- 1971: Ali Cengiz Oyunu
- 1971: Aslanlar Kükreyince
- 1971: Bayan Bacak Ve Tabanca Bıçak
- 1971: İki Belalı Adam
- 1971: Kızıl Maske'nin İntikamı
- 1971: Namlunun Ucundasın
- 1971: Yumurcağın Tatlı Rüyaları
- 1971: Zagor Kara Bela
- 1971: Sezercik Yavrum Benim
- 1972: Kara Murat Fatih'in Fedaisi
- 1972: Tophaneli Murat
- 1974: Babalık
- 1974: Kara Murat Ölüm Emri
- 1974: Karateciler İstanbul'da
- 1974: Yatık Emine
- 1975: Babaların Babası
- 1975: Babanın Oğlu
- 1975: İnsan Avcısı
- 1975: Kara Murat Kara Şövalyeye Karşı
- 1975: Soysuzlar
- 1976: Can Pazarı
- 1976: İki Kızgın Adam
- 1976: Kara Murat Şeyh Gaffar'a Karşı
- 1977: Baba Ocağı
- 1977: Cemil Dönüyor
- 1977: Erkeğim
- 1977: Güneş Ne Zaman Doğacak
- 1977: Hakanlar Çarpışıyor
- 1977: Memiş
- 1978: Baba Kartal
- 1978: İnsanları Seveceksin
- 1978: Kara Murat Devler Savaşıyor
- 1978: Kılıç Bey
- 1978: Lekeli Melek
- 1979: İki Cambaz
- 1979: Korkusuz Korkak
- 1979: Umudumuz Şaban
- 1981: Üç Kağıtçı
- 1982: Gırgır Ali
- 1983: Vahşi Kan
- 1984: Sokaktan Gelen Kadın
- 1984: Atla Gel Şaban
- 1984: Kartal Bey
- 1984: Yaşadıkça
- 1986: Sokak Kavgacısı
- 1987: Son Kahramanlar
- 1988: Bombacı
- 1989: Bir Aşk Bin Günah
- 1989: Beni Bende Bitirdiler
- 1989: Hedef
- 1989: Zehir Hafiye
- 1989: Vahşi ve Güzel
- 1989: Yüzünü Şeytan Görsün

=== Selected filmography ===
- The Broken Pots (1960)
- Love and Grudge (1964)
- Hakanlar Çarpışıyor (1977)
- Korkusuz Korkak (1979)

== Selected filmography ==
- The Broken Pots (1960)
- Love and Grudge (1964)
- Hakanlar Çarpışıyor (1977)
- Korkusuz Korkak (1979)
