= Bülent Oran =

Turkish screenwriter and actor

- Born: 27 March 1924; Istanbul, Turkey
- Died: 23 September 2004 (aged 80); Istanbul, Turkey
- Occupations: Screenwriter, actor
- Years active: 1940–1990

Bülent Oran (27 March 1924 – 23 September 2004) was a Turkish screenwriter and actor. He wrote for nearly 250 films between 1952 and 1988. He wrote for the film The Broken Pots, which was entered into the 11th Berlin International Film Festival.

== filmography ==
=== Oyuncu olarak ===
- 1940: Şehvet Kurbanı
- 1940: Yılmaz Ali
- 1943: On Üç Kahraman
- 1945: On Üç Kahraman
- 1950: Parmaksız Salih
- 1951: Vatan ve Namık Kemal
- 1952: Drakula İstanbul'da
- 1952: Can Yoldaşı
- 1952: Cennet Yolcuları
- 1952: İngiliz Kemal Lawrens'e Karşı
- 1952: Zehir Kaçakçıları
- 1953: Drakula İstanbul'da
- 1953: Kezban
- 1954: Aramızda Yaşıyamazsın
- 1954: Çalsın Sazlar Oynasın Kızlar
- 1954: Evlat Acısı
- 1954: Son Şarkı
- 1955: Artık Çok Geç
- 1955: Kaybolan Gençlik
- 1955: Yol Palas Cinayeti
- 1956: Papatya
- 1956: Yedi Köyün Zeynebi
- 1957: Çölde Bir İstanbul Kızı
- 1957: Dertli Gönül / Çıksın Bu Can
- 1957: Pusu
- 1957: Uçurum
- 1957: Yanık Kezban
- 1958: Ayrılık
- 1958: Elveda
- 1958: Günahkarlar Cenneti
- 1958: İnsanlık İçin / Kuduz
- 1958: Kelepçe
- 1959: Poyraz Osman
- 1960: Kırık Kalpler
- 1960: Ölüm Perdesi
- 1960: Vatan Ve Namus
- 1961: Aşk ve Yumruk
- 1961: İki Damla Gözyaşı
- 1961: Kabadayılar Kralı
- 1961: Sessiz Harp
- 1961: Şeytanın Kılıcı
- 1961: Yaman Gazeteci
- 1962: Kadın Ve Tabanca
- 1963: Leyla İle Mecnun Gibi
- 1963: Yabancı Kız
- 1964: Bitirim Fatma
- 1964: Galatalı Fatma - Bitirim Fatma
- 1964: Poyraz Osman
- 1965: Yalnız Değiliz
- 1966: Ümit Kurbanları
- 1967: Sefiller
- 1968: Yara
- 1969: Çingene Aşkı Paprika
- 1970: Ankara Ekspresi
- 1970: Arım, Balım, Peteğim

== Selected filmography ==
- The Broken Pots (1960)
- Ankara Ekspresi (1970)
