= The Broken Pots =

1960 film

- Directed by: Memduh Ün
- Written by: Lale Oraloğlu; Bülent Oran; Halit Refiğ
- Produced by: Nusret Ikbal
- Starring: Lale Oraloğlu
- Cinematography: Turgud Ören
- Release date: 1960
- Running time: 80 minutes
- Country: Turkey
- Language: Turkish

The Broken Pots (Turkish: Kırık Çanaklar) is a 1960 Turkish drama film directed by Memduh Ün. It was entered into the 11th Berlin International Film Festival.

== Cast ==
- Lale Oraloğlu - Sabahat
- Turgut Özatay - Cemal
- Rüya Gümüsata - Ayten
- Mualla Kaynak - Mualla
- Salih Tozan - Hüseyin, the grandfather
- Engin Deniz
- Niyazi Er
- Mahmure Handan
- Asim Nipton - The lawyer
- Adnan Uygur - Nuri, the boss
- Reha Yurdakul - Sabri
