= Kara Murat Şeyh Gaffar'a Karşı =

- Directed by: Natuk Baytan
- Written by: Fuat Özlüer; Erdoğan Tünaş
- Based on: Kara Murat Şeyh Gaffar'a Karşı by Rahmi Turan
- Produced by: Türker İnanoğlu; Željko Kunkera
- Starring: Cüneyt Arkın
- Cinematography: Hans Jura
- Music by: Piero Piccioni
- Distributed by: Erler Film
- Release dates: 1 February 1977 (Turkey); 27 January 1978 (Italy)
- Running time: 85 minutes
- Countries: Turkey; Italy
- Language: Turkish/Italian

Kara Murat Şeyh Gaffar'a Karşı (Italian: Karamurat, la belva dell'Anatolia) is a 1976 Turkish-Italian costume drama-action film directed by Natuk Baytan. It is the fifth film in a series based on the comic strip character Kara Murat, a Janissary spy in the service of Mehmed the Conqueror, created by journalist and cartoonist Rahmi Turan. Turkish action film star Cüneyt Arkın played Kara Murat in all films of the series.

== Plot ==
By the year 1456, Mehmed the Conqueror (Bora Ayanoğlu) has decided to extend the borders of his empire to the east, into the lands of the Aq Qoyunlu. However, Sheikh Gaffar (Pasquale Basile), ruler of a heretic sect near Kharput defies the Sultan's rule and imprisons the ambassadors sent by him. Sultan Mehmed commissions Kara Murat to assassinate Gaffar.

== Cast ==
- Cüneyt Arkın: Kara Murat (Karamurat)
- Pasquale Basile: Gaffar (Mustafà)
- Bora Ayanoğlu: Mehmed the Conqueror (Mammaluch)
- Daniela Giordano: Zeynep (Suleima)
- Turgut Özatay: Eşkiya Abdo (il bandito Alì Babà)
