= Olcayto =

- Gender: Male

Origin
- Language: Turkish
- Meaning: Luck, Lucky

Other names
- Related names: Olcay

Olcayto is a masculine Turkish given name. In Turkish "Olcayto" means "Luck", and/or "Lucky". Olcayto is the masculine version of "Olcay" which is a feminine Turkish given name (although it has been used as a male given name as well, as in footballer Olcay Şahan's name for instance).

Notable people and characters named Olcayto include:

== People ==
- Olcayto Ahmet Tuğsuz, Turkish singer, lyricist and composer, member of the group Nazar at Eurovision Song Contest 1978
- Olcayto (1280–1316), eighth Ilkhanid dynasty ruler in Iran from 1304 to 1316
- Gazanfer Olcayto, football player for Mersin İdmanyurdu

== Fictional characters ==
- Olcayto, protagonist of 1977 film Hakanlar Çarpışıyor

== See also ==
- Öljaitü
