= Ayşin Atav =

Turkish actress and voice actress

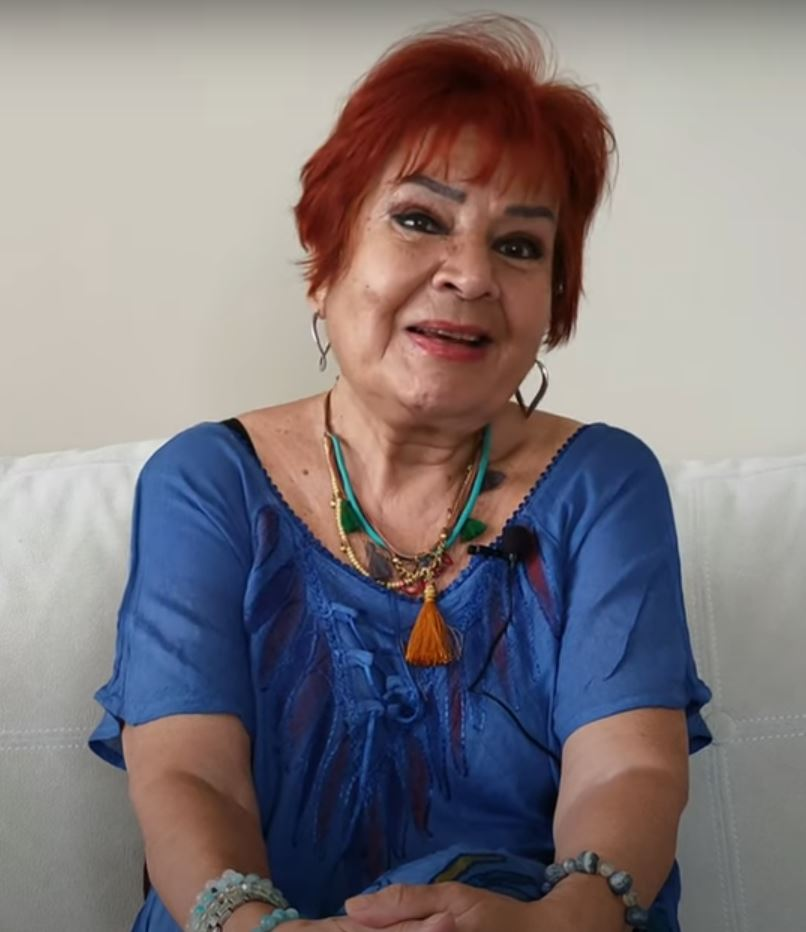
- Born: 2 April 1942 (age 83); Ankara, Turkey
- Occupations: Actress, Voice Actress
- Years active: 1964–present

Ayşin Atav (born 2 April 1948) is a Turkish film and voice actress.

== Career ==
Ayşin Atav was born on 2 April 1948 in Ankara. Atav began her acting career as a theater actress in Istanbul on 1965. She appeared in over 500 films as the voice actress and actress.

== Filmography ==
- Korkusuz Korkak - 1979
- Yadeller - 1978
- Çılgın Gangster - 1973
- Gülüzar - 1972
- Asiler Kampı - 1972
- Allahaısmarladık Katil - 1972
- Gelinlik Kızlar - 1972
- Öfke - 1972
- Damdaki Kemancı - 1972
- Sev Kardeşim - 1972
- İlk Aşk - 1972
- Utanç - 1972
- Severek Ayrılalım - 1971
- Kezban Paris'te - 1971
- Üç Öfkeli Adam - 1971
- Bütün Aşklar Tatlı Başlar - 1970
- Kezban Roma'da - 1970
- Vatan Kurtaran Aslan - 1966
- Fakir ve Mağrur - 1966
