= Ayşe Arman =

Turkish journalist and columnist (born 1969)

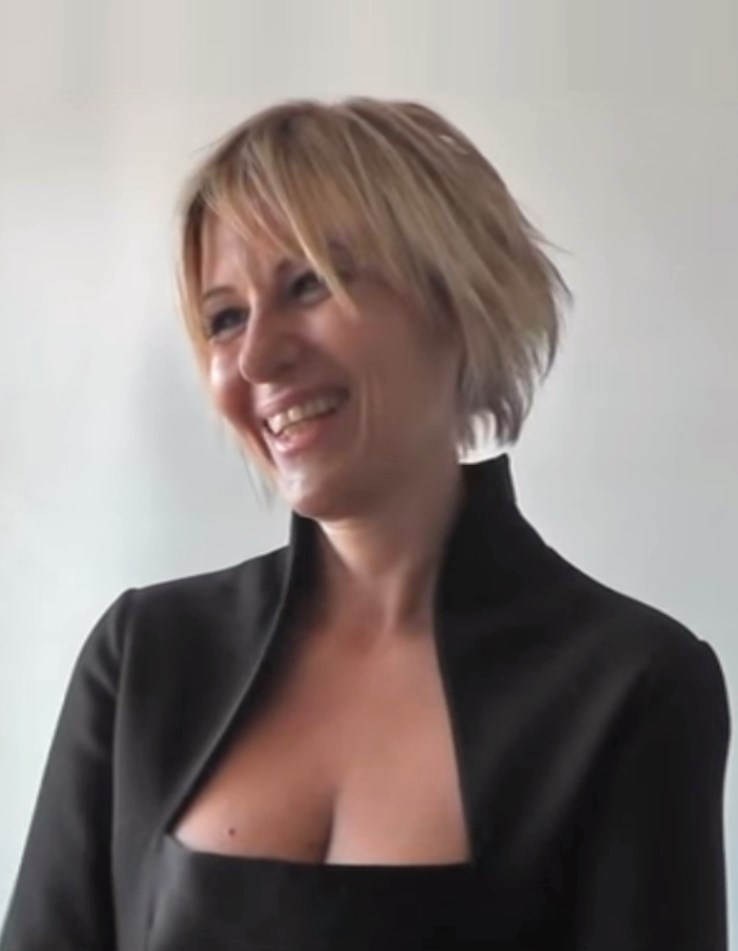
- Arman in 2015
- Born: 9 December 1969 (age 56); Adana, Turkey
- Education: Tarsus Amerikan Koleji; Istanbul University
- Occupations: Columnist, journalist
- Spouse: Ömer Dormen (m. 2004)
- Children: 1
- Relatives: Haldun Dormen (father-in-law); Betül Mardin (mother-in-law)

Ayşe Arman (born 9 December 1969) is a Turkish journalist and columnist. She is best known for her interviews. Arman is the author of two books, one of which is a compilation of best moments of her interviews made over the past decade. Arman also holds German citizenship.

== Personal life ==
Arman was born in her father's hometown of Adana. Her mother is German. After her graduation from Tarsus American College in Tarsus, province Mersin, she attended the School of Press and Publishing at Istanbul University, but did not graduate. She is married to Ömer Dormen, the son of theater actor Haldun Dormen and public relations specialist Betül Mardin. They have one daughter together, named Alya.

== Professional life ==
Arman started her career in journalism in the 1990s within the team of the weekly magazine Nokta. At Hürriyet, she was noted for her frank approach to personal matters. In some of her articles, she has addressed issues such as feminism and LGBT rights. In November 2019, Arman announced her resignation from her post as a columnist for Hürriyet.

Ayşe Arman was also a jury member in the Turkish version of Dancing on Ice (Turkish: Buzda Dans) started 8 January 2007.

== Bibliography ==
- Kimse Okumazsa Ben Okurum, Epsilon Publishing (2002), 330pp, ISBN 975-331-400-0
- Kimse Sormazsa Ben Sorarım, Epsilon Publishing (2003), 352pp, ISBN 975-331-488-4
- Alya, Sevgilim ve Ben, (2009)
- Gezinin Güzel İnsanları, (2013)

== Awards ==
- Cumhuriyet Newspaper, Bülent Dikmener Award, 1989.
