= Sevmek Ve Ölmek Zamanı =

- Directed by: Halit Refiğ
- Starring: Türkan Soray, Murat Soydan, and Zuhal Aktan
- Release date: 1971
- Country: Turkey
- Language: Turkish

Sevmek Ve Ölmek Zamanı is a 1971 Turkish romance film, directed by Halit Refiğ and starring Türkan Soray, Murat Soydan, and Zuhal Aktan.
