= Betül Mardin =

Turkish journalist (born 1926)

- Born: 1 December 1926 (age 99); Istanbul, Turkey
- Citizenship: Turkish
- Education: Arnavutköy American College for Girls; BBC Television Course
- Occupation: Journalist
- Organization: Istanbul Bilgi University
- Spouse: Akgün Usta (m. 1950; div. 1956) Haldun Dormen (m. 1959; div. 1967)
- Children: 2
- Relatives: Arif Mardin (brother); Şerif Mardin (cousin); Ayşe Arman (daughter-in-law)
- Awards: Member Emeritus by the International Public Relations Association

Betül Mardin (born 1 December 1926) is a Turkish journalist who laid the foundations of public relations in Turkey.

== Early life and education ==
Mardin was born on 1926 in Istanbul. She is the second child of the Mardin family. She is the older sister of famous music producer Arif Mardin.

She graduated from Arnavutköy American College for Girls and BBC Television Course, rose to the presidency of the International Public Relations Association (IPRA) in 1995 and became the first Turkish female president of IPRA with this task. She is considered a master in public relations with this award, which is one of the few in the world, with the title "Member Emeritus", which was later given to her by the International Public Relations Association. She is a faculty member at Istanbul Bilgi University, Faculty of Communication, Department of Public Relations.

== Personal life ==
Mardin was married twice, first to Akgün Usta with whom she had a daughter and second to Turkish actor Haldun Dormen with whom she had a son.
