= Korkusuz Korkak =

- Directed by: Natuk Baytan
- Written by: Erdoğan Tünaş
- Produced by: Yahya Kılıç
- Starring: Kemal Sunal; Turgut Özatay; Ayşin Atav; Nejat Gürçen; Zafer Önen; Hikmet Taşdemir; Rıza Pekkutsal; Belkıs Dilligil
- Release date: 1979
- Running time: 77 minutes
- Country: Turkey
- Language: Turkish

The Fearless Coward (Turkish: Korkusuz Korkak) is a 1979 Turkish comedy film directed by Natuk Baytan.

== Cast ==
- Kemal Sunal - Mülayim Sert
- Turgut Özatay - Ayı Abbas
- Ayşin Atav - Sevil
- Nejat Gürçen - Patron
- Zafer Önen - Müdür

== In popular culture ==
Mülayim Sert's sudden and radical transformation has created a lasting metaphor in Turkish popular culture. The phrase "Bomber Mülayim" (Turkish: Bombacı Mülayim) has become a cultural code describing how a person who generally appears docile, timid, or passive suddenly loses their temper or displays extreme, reckless courage, engaging in radical and reckless behavior.

Rapper Kayra referenced the film in his 2013 single "Mesela Yani," and also included lines from the film in the track.
