= Vedat Türkali =

Turkish screenwriter, novelist

- Vedat Türkali a.k.a. Abdülkadir Pirhasan
- Born: Abdülkadir "Demirkan" Pirhasan; 13 May 1919; Samsun, Ottoman Empire
- Died: 29 August 2016 (aged 97); Yalova, Turkey
- Resting place: Zincirlikuyu Cemetery
- Education: Turkology; Graduation
- Alma mater: Istanbul University
- Occupations: Writer; Novelist; Screenwriter; Playwright; Director; Teacher
- Spouse: Merih Pirhasan (m. 1942; died 2013)
- Children: Barış Pirhasan (son); Deniz Türkali (daughter)
- Relatives: Zeynep Casalini (granddaughter)
- Writing career
- Pen name: Vedat Türkali
- Language: Turkish
- Years active: 1958–2016
- Period: 1960 Turkish coup d'état 1980 Turkish coup d'état
- Subjects: Politics; Social; Hamidiyes; Armenians; Kurds
- Notable works: Karanlıkta Uyananlar, Bir Gün Tek Başına, Mavi Karanlık
- Notable awards: Full list

Abdülkadir "Demirkan" Pirhasan (13 May 1919 – 29 August 2016), known by his pen name as Vedat Türkali, was a Turkish screenwriter, novelist, playwright, intellectual, teacher and the member of the Democratic People's Party. He is also credited to "film director" for making three films in Turkish cinema as a director. He was the recipient of numerous accolades, including International Antalya Film Festival — Best Screenplay for Karanlıkta Uyananlar (Those Who Wake in the Darkness) film.

At the age of 21, he married Merih Pirhasan in 1942, with whom he had two children: Barış Pirhasan and Deniz Türkali. An Italian-Turkish singer namely Zeynep Casalini is his granddaughter.

Türkali wrote more than forty screenplays, four theater plays, and eight novels throughout his career since 1958. His novels, including Bir Gün Tek Başına (One Day Alone) and Mavi Karanlık (Blue Darkness) appears in prominent literary works in modern Turkish literature. The year 2004 was artistically referred to as the "Year of Vedat Türkali" by the different people such as writers, artists, human rights defenders, and other people associated with or working in related fields.

He is often recognized one of the greatest writers in the history of Turkish literature. He was detained fifty one times over his controversial writings and political movements carried out with the Communist Party of Turkey.

== Early life ==
Türkali was born as Abdülkadir Demirkan on 13 May 1919 in Samsun city of Turkey (formerly Ottoman Empire). His surname "Demirkan" was replaced with "Pirhasan" by a court order in 1950. He completed his secondary schooling from a school in Samsun city, and later in 1942 he attended Istanbul University where he graduated in Turkology (in languages and literature). After completing his education, he then worked as a teacher of literature at Kuleli Military High School and at Turkish Military Academy in Ankara.

In 1951 or earlier, he served in Turkish Land Forces as a military officer, but was dismissed over political issues. Later a military court found him guilty in carrying out political movements against government and for writing on prolonged political issues. The court later sent him to jail and sentenced to nine years. After spending seven years in a Turkish prison, he was released in 1958 under the certain constitutional rules. He was charged multiple times following the 1980 Turkish coup d'état, and later went to London and lived there for over one year between 1989 and 1999. Later, he joined an old daily newspaper of Turkey Cumhuriyet and served as an editor. He was subsequently removed from the job over writing an anonymous novel under "Hüsamettin Gönenli" name criticising the newspaper owner Yunus Nadi Abalıoğlu. The novel was originally written at his publishing company Gar Publications co-founded by him and a Turkish teacher Rıfat Ilgaz.

== Career ==
Türkali primarily wrote about different aspects of issues, ethnic and minority groups, including Hamidiyes, Armenians, Kurds, social issues, Turkish politics and literature. He covered Armenian genocide in his writings, making him the first novelist in the history of Turkish literature who wrote about the conflicts involving Armenians and Turkish. He started his career between 1958 and 1960 as a screenwriter with Dolandırıcılar Şahı film directed by Atıf Yılmaz. In 1964 he wrote script for Karanlıkta Uyananlar (Those Who Wake in the Darkness) film that became his one of the prominent works. The film was awarded at the 2nd Antalya Golden Orange Film Festival for Best Script. A Turkish television drama titled Fatmagül'ün Suçu Ne? (What is Fatmagül's crime?) is also credited to his writings as its episodes are based on one of his novels. The drama was criticised by the censorship committee citing "a Turkish man does not marry the girl raped by others". Türkali covered 1960 Turkish coup d'état in his first-ever cinematographic novel titled Bir Gün Tek Başına (One Day Alone), which was published in 1974. He also served as a director and member at Turkish Authors' Association or at Turkish Authors' Association. (Note: Turkish Authors' Association and Turkish Authors' Association seem to be associated with Turkish Writers Union and Peace Association. It is not clearly verified whether it is a separate organization)

=== Work ===
Key
†	Remarks denote a short description of the work where available.

#	Title	Year	Type/Credited as	Remarks
1	Otobüs Yolcuları (The Bus Passengers)	1961	Screenwriter	—N/a
2	Karanlıkta Uyananlar (Those Who Wake in the Darkness)	1964	Screenwriter	—N/a
3	Erkek Ali (Male Ali)	1964	Screenwriter	—N/a
4	Sokakta Kan Vardı (Blood on the street)	1965	Director	—N/a
5	Üç Tekerlekli Bisiklet (Tricycle)	1965	Writings and memoirs	—N/a
6	Şehirdeki Yabancı (Stranger in the City)	1965	Writings and memoirs	—N/a
7	141 Basamak (141st Step)	1971	Play	—N/a
8	Bedrana	1974	Writer	—N/a
9	Bir Gün Tek Başına (One Day Alone)	1974 (Note: Different dates have been shown by the news media. The CNN Türk has mentioned the date as "1989", while other websites shows "1974".)	Novel	Covered 1960 military coup in Turkey and the author's detention.
10	Bu Ölü Kalkacak (This Dead Will Get Up)	1976	Play	—N/a
11	Güneşli Bataklık (Sunny Swamp)	1977	Screenwriter	—N/a
12	Kara Çarşaflı Gelin (The Dark-Veiled Bride)	1977	Screenwriter	—N/a
13	Eski Şiirler, Yeni Türküler (Old Poems New Turks)	1979	Poem	The book witnesses historical events of Turkey.
14	Üç Film Birden (Three Films at Once)	1979	Screenplay	—N/a
15	Mavi Karanlık (Blue Darkness)	1983	Novel	Covers a life of a Nigerian PhD student who saved her lover from being assaulted.
16	Eski Filmler (Old Films)	1984	Screenplay	—N/a
17	Bu Gemi Nereye (Where is the Boat Going)	1985	Writings and memoirs	—N/a
18	Dallar Yeşil Olmalı (The Branches Should be Green)	1985	Play	—N/a
19	Yeşilçam Dedikleri Türkiye (Angry Boy)	1986	Novel	—N/a
20	Tek Kişilik Ölüm (Individual Death)	1989	Novel	Covers the events occurred during 1980 Turkish coup d'état
21	Savunmalar (Defenses)	1989	Writings and memoirs	—N/a
22	Özgürlük İçin Kürt Yazıları (Kurdish Writings for Freedom)	1996	Writings and memoirs	The book consists articles, speeches and interviews related to the "struggle of freedom" of the people who were prosecuted or discriminated during the military dictatorship.
23	Güven (Trust)	1999	Novel	The book covers Turkey's events occurred during the WW2. It also covers the era of Communist Party of the country with all dimensions.
24	Komünist (Communist)	2001	Writings and memoirs	The autobiographical book covers writer's life from childhood to college, including his "51 detentions"
25	Yeşilçam Dedikleri Türkiye (They say Turkey Yeşilçam)	2001	Writings and memoirs	—N/a
26	Bu Ölü Kalkacak (This Corpse Will Rise)	2002	Play	—N/a
27	Kayıp Romanlar (The Lost Novels)	2004	Novel	A young girl who starts her new life with a boy who is older than her.
28	Yalancı Tanıklar Kahvesi (The Coffee of Lying Witness)	2009	Novel	It covers 1971 Turkish military memorandum and its participants for the cause of Turkey.
29	Şeytanın Kaşık Oyunları (Devil's Spoon Games)	2009	Novel	The book covers destruction caused by the earthquake, robbery, and exploitations in Istanbul.
30	Bitti Bitti Bitmedi (It's Over, It's Over, isn't Over)	2014	Novel	Covers prisoners' life at Diyarbakır Prison. The book claims real occurrences based on true facts or incidents.

== Political activities ==
In 2002 Türkali established his political associations with the Communist Party of Turkey and later Democratic People's Party. While with Democratic's party he participated in the 2002 Turkish general election as a candidate but lost. He was actively involved in politics and choose to become a communist after reading proclaimed-controversial publications at the Gazi Husrev-beg Library. The police raided his friend's house and detained his friend Haig Açıkgöz and started interrogating about Türkali's presence. He was allegedly tortured by the local police over not naming him. Later, he started working secretly outside for Kurdish movement, while Haig Açıkgöz along with his wife Merih established a hideout to escape from arrests. He was actively supported by his vedats such as Behice Boran, Muzaffer Şerif, Haig and Mihri Belli. Türkali escaped several times from arrests and was ultimately detained in 1951.

== Awards ==
Year	Award	Nominated work	Category	Result
1965	International Antalya Film Festival	Karanlıkta Uyananlar (Those Who Wake in the Darkness)	Best Screenplay	Won
1970	TRT Award	Dallar Yeşil Olmalı (The Branches Should be Green)	—N/a	Won
1974	Milliyet Milliyet Publications Novel Competition	Bir Gün Tek Başına (One Day Alone)	Honorary	Won
1974	Karlovy Vary International Film Festival	Bedrana	—N/a	Won
1976	Orhan Kemal Roman Armağanı	Bir Gün Tek Başına (One Day Alone)	—N/a	Won
1977	Altın Portakal Film Festivali	—N/a	—N/a	Won
1977	Antalya Golden Orange Film Festival	Kara Çarşaflı Gelin (Black Veiled Bride)	Best Screenplay	Won
2009	SIYAD Awards of Turkish Film Critics Association	—N/a	Honorary	Won
2016	White Seagull Literary Prize of Honor	—N/a	Honorary	Won

== Death ==
Türkali was suffering from chronic conditions and was subsequently admitted to Yalova Public Hospital for medical treatment. He died in Yalova on 29 August 2016 of multiple organ dysfunction. He is buried in Zincirlikuyu Cemetery where his wife Merih Pirhasan is buried. She died in November 2013.

=== Funeral ===
His funeral was attended by the numerous people, leading the local police to use tear gas to prevent procession marched from Teşvikiye Mosque to Zincirlikuyu Cemetery. It is claimed funeral attendees used "Friendship among peoples" and "Peace right now" slogans during the procession, while some people marched holding cover photos of the poems and novels written by Türkali.

== Bibliography ==
- Türkali, Vedat; Uğur, Vildan (198x). Eski filmler. Cem Yayınevi. p. 460.
- Türkali, Vedat; yayınları, Gendaş (1981). Den' odinočestva: roman; perevod s tureckogo. Progress.
- Türkali, Vedat (1984). Bir gün tek başına: roman. Cem Yayınevi. p. 608.
- Türkali, Vedat (1984). Güven, volume 1. Ayrinti Yayinlari. p. 800. ISBN 9789752892699.
- Türkali, Vedat (1989). Savunmalar: Yazılar Konuşmalar söyleşiler savunmalar Kültür dizisi. Cem Yayınevi. p. 192.
- Türkali, Vedat; yazarları, Türk (1989). Tek kişilik ölüm: roman. Cem Yayınevi. p. 280. ISBN 9789754061680.
- Türkali, Vedat; yayınları, Gendaş (2001). Eski şiirler, yeni türküler. Gendaş. p. 143. ISBN 9789753083324.
- Türkali, Vedat; Hakan, Ahmet (2002). Vedat Türkali : why did I become a Communist?. University of Michigan. p. 110. ISBN 9789758618309.
- Türkali, Vedat (2002). Dallar yeşil olmalı: oyun. Gendaş. p. 126. ISBN 9789753083867.
- Türkali, Vedat (2004). Kayıp romanlar. Everest. p. 631. ISBN 9789752891777.
- Türkali, Vedat (2005). Özgürlük için Kürt yazıları. Everest Yayınları. p. 126. ISBN 9789752892040.
- Türkali, Vedat (2005). Tüm yazıları konuşmaları. Everest Yayınları. p. 580.
- Türkali, Vedat; Arıkan, Meltem (2006). Mavi karanlık. Everest Yayınları. p. 278. ISBN 9789752892064.
- Türkali, Vedat (2009). Tek Kisilik Ölüm Cep Boy: Komünist 2 Kitap Birarada. Everest Yayinlari. p. 456. ISBN 9789752895294.
- Türkali, Vedat (2009). Seytanin Kasik Oyunlari. Yazilama Yayinevi. p. 110. ISBN 9786055892227.
- Türkali, Vedat (2011). Fatmagül'ün suçu ne?. Kırmızıkedi. p. 116. ISBN 9786055340070.
- Türkali, Vedat (2014). Bitti bitti- bitmedi. Ayrıntı. p. 190. ISBN 9789755399539.
