= Love and Grudge =

1964 Turkish film

- Film poster
- Directed by: Turgut Demirağ
- Written by: Turgut Demirağ
- Produced by: Turgut Demirağ
- Starring: Belgin Doruk
- Cinematography: Gani Turanli
- Release date: 1964
- Running time: 92 minutes
- Country: Turkey
- Language: Turkish

Love and Grudge (Turkish: Aşk ve Kin) is a 1964 Turkish drama film directed by Turgut Demirağ. It was entered into the 4th Moscow International Film Festival. At the 2nd Antalya Golden Orange Film Festival it won the Golden Orange Award for Best Film.

== Cast ==
- Belgin Doruk as Cahide Ersoy
- Cüneyt Arkın as Doktor Kadri Ersoy
- Leyla Sayar as Nevin Yalın
- Turgut Özatay as Zihni Yalın
- Cenk Er
- Senih Orkan
- Feridun Çölgeçen
- Ahmet Kostarika (as Ahmet Turgutlu)
- Afif Yesari
- Tülin Özek
