= A Woman Is a Woman =

1961 film by Jean-Luc Godard

- Theatrical release poster
- French: Une femme est une femme
- Directed by: Jean-Luc Godard
- Written by: Jean-Luc Godard
- Produced by: Carlo Ponti; Georges de Beauregard
- Starring: Jean-Paul Belmondo; Anna Karina; Jean-Claude Brialy
- Cinematography: Raoul Coutard
- Edited by: Agnès Guillemot; Lila Herman
- Music by: Michel Legrand
- Production companies: Euro International Films; Rome Paris Films
- Distributed by: Unidex (France); Euro International Films (Italy)
- Release dates: 1 July 1961 (Berlin); 6 September 1961 (France); 25 October 1961 (Italy)
- Running time: 84 minutes
- Countries: France; Italy
- Language: French
- Budget: $160,000 (est.)
- Box office: 549,931 admissions (France) $209,837 (US)

A Woman Is a Woman (French: Une femme est une femme) is a 1961 experimental musical romantic comedy film written and directed by Jean-Luc Godard, and starring Jean-Paul Belmondo, Anna Karina and Jean-Claude Brialy. A tribute to the American musical comedy and associated with the French New Wave, it is Godard's third feature film (the release of his second, Le petit soldat, was delayed by censorship), and his first in color and anamorphic widescreen.

== Plot ==
The film centers on the relationship of exotic dancer Angéla and her lover Émile. Angéla wants to have a child, but Émile is not ready. Émile's best friend Alfred also says he loves Angéla, and keeps up a gentle pursuit. Angéla and Émile bitterly argue about having a child; at one point they decide not to speak to each other, so continue their argument by pulling books from the shelf and pointing to the titles. Since Émile stubbornly refuses her request for a child, Angéla finally decides to accept Alfred's plea and sleeps with him. This proves that she will do what she must to have a child. She and Émile finally reconcile, so he has a chance to become the father. The two have sex, then engage in a bit of wordplay that gives the film its title: an exasperated Émile says "Angéla, tu es infâme" ("Angela, you are horrid"), and she retorts, "Non, je suis une femme" ("No, I am a woman").

== Cast ==
- Anna Karina as Angela
- Jean-Claude Brialy as Émile Récamier
- Jean-Paul Belmondo as Alfred Lubitsch
- Henri Attal as false blind man #2 (uncredited)
- Karyn Balm (uncredited)
- Dorothée Blank as prostitute 3 (uncredited)
- Marie Dubois as Angela's friend (uncredited)
- Ernest Menzer as bar owner (uncredited)
- Jeanne Moreau as woman in bar (herself)
- Nicole Paquin as Suzanne (uncredited)
- Gisèle Sandré as prostitute 2 (uncredited)
- Marion Sarraut as prostitute 1 (uncredited)
- Dominique Zardi as false blind man #1 (uncredited)

== Awards ==
- 11th Berlin International Film Festival
  - Silver Bear for Best Actress (Karina - won)
  - Silver Bear Extraordinary Jury Prize (won)
  - Golden Bear (nominated)
