= Zafer Önen =

Turkish actor

- Born: 1921; Çorum, Ottoman Empire
- Died: 13 December 2013 (aged 91–92); Istanbul, Turkey
- Resting place: Feriköy Cemetery, Istanbul
- Occupation: Film actor
- Years active: 1942–2011

Zafer Önen (1921 – 13 December 2013) was a Turkish film actor. He is buried in Zincirlikuyu Cemetery in the European part of Istanbul, Turkey.

== Filmography ==
- Ruhun Duymaz - 2004
- Bayanlar Baylar - 2002
- Hastayım Doktor - 2002
- Canlı Hayat - 2000
- Affet Bizi Hocam - 1998
- Köşe Kapmaca - 1996
- Tatlı Kaçıklar - 1996
- Kuruntu Ailesi - 1986
- Bir Kadın Bir Hayat - 1985
- Sizin Dersane - 1980
- Tanrıya Feryat - 1980
- Babanın Kızları - 1979
- Emekli Başkan - 1979
- Bu Gece Bende Kal - 1979
- Minnoş - 1979
- Korkusuz Korkak - 1979
- Oooh Oh - 1978
- Eksik Etek - 1976
- Güngörmüşler - 1976
- Adamını Bul - 1975
- Kadınım - 1975
- Bekaret Kemeri - 1975
- Gece Kuşu Zehra - 1975
- Televizyon Çocuğu - 1975
- Cici Kız - 1974
- Mirasyediler - 1974
- Hostes - 1974
- Özleyiş - 1973
- Elveda Meyhaneci - 1972
- Çapkınlar Şahı - 1972
- Solan Bir Yaprak Gibi - 1971
- İki Ruhlu Kadın - 1971
- Sevdiğim Uşak - 1971
- Ayşecik Bahar Çiçeği - 1971
- Gönül Hırsızı - 1971
- Talihsiz Baba - 1970
- Bütün Aşklar Tatlı Başlar - 1970
- Tatlı Meleğim - 1970
- Aşk Mabudesi - 1969
- Ümit Dünyası - 1969
- Sarmaşık Gülleri - 1968
- Yaratılan Kadın - 1968
- Kadın Düşmanı - 1967
- Ayşecik Boş Beşik - 1965
- Berduş Milyoner - 1965
- Şehvetin Esiriyiz - 1965
- Ateş Gibi Kadın - 1965
- Acemi Çapkın - 1964
- Karımın Sevgilisi - 1959
- Fosforlu'nun Oyunu - 1959
- Çileli Bülbül - 1957
- Yaşlı Gözler - 1955
- Curcuna - 1955
