= Hakanlar Çarpışıyor =

- Directed by: Natuk Baytan
- Written by: Erdoğan Tünaş
- Produced by: Memduh Ün
- Starring: Cüneyt Arkın; Bahar Erdeniz; Aytekin Akkaya; Hüseyin Peyda
- Release date: 1977
- Country: Turkey
- Language: Turkish

Hakanlar Çarpışıyor (Khans Are Fighting) is a Turkish historic action film by Natuk Baytan. It was released in 1977, during the most popular days of the Turkish historic films. The film is about the life of a Turkic warrior named Olcayto, portrayed by Cüneyt Arkın, who is the son of a Kyrgyz chief in Central Asia. When he was a small boy, Chinese troops attack their tribe and kill Olcayto's father. After this event, he decides to take revenge from Chinese warlords. Later, he would find a chance to do so when Chinese form an alliance with a Sheikh from South Asia, who uses all his efforts to kill Olcayto because of the love affair between his daughter and Olcayto.

One of the main motives of the film is the "Bozkır Yasası" (Law of the Steppe). During many key scenes of the film, characters act according to this notion which praises the success of a warrior. This also gives the film a nationalistic flavour which can be considered as an "essential" point of the genre.

Writer Erdoğan Tünaş possibly got his inspiration from Karaoğlan, the popular character of Suat Yalaz. Both Olcayto and Karaoğlan are from Central Asia, they are talented warriors, they have noble black horses and they both use swords which have grey wolf figures on their handles. Another important detail of the film is that Cüneyt Arkın's partner in it is Aytekin Akkaya, the same actor who also stars in the Turkish cult film Dünyayı Kurtaran Adam with Arkın.

== Cast ==
- Cüneyt Arkın as Halit, Olcayto and Başbuğ Toluğ (triple role)
- Bahar Erdeniz as Zeliha, Olcayto's wife
- Aytekin Akkaya as Tegin Khan
- Hüseyin Peyda as Sheikh Malik
- Turgut Özatay as Tun-Kay
- Hikmet Taşdemir - Kabir
- Reha Yurdakul - Celme Noyan
- Levent Çakır - Sungur
- Sönmez Yıkılmaz - Demirbilek El-Cerrah
- Arseven Gümüş - Khaan
- Süheyl Eğriboz - Kim-Yu
- Mehmet Uğur - Çinli
- Necdet Kökeş - Çakır
- Cemal Konca - Şen-Kin
- Muzaffer Cıvan - Moğol
- Arap Celal - Hancı
- Niyazi Er - Tağmaç Beyi
- Yılmaz Kurt - Çinli
- Kadir Kök - Çinli/Kara Sadi
- Hakkı Kıvanç - Sheikh Malik
- Ahmet Sert - Boğaç Usta
- Doğan Tamer
- Hamit Haskabal - Khan's henchman
- Asım Par - Çinli
- Yadigar Ejder - Cellat
- Oktar Durukan - Yantar

== See also ==
- Cinema of Turkey
