= Ali Rıza Seyfi =

Turkish novelist, historian and poet (1879 - 1958)

Ali Rıza Seyfi (1879–1958) was a Turkish novelist, historian and poet.

He was born in Istanbul. His real surname was Seyfioğlu but he often wrote under the pen name of Ali Rıza. He was the brother of Süleyman Nutki, a naval history writer. He attended the Kasımpaşa Naval Elementary School and served at various posts in Basra, with the fleet in the Dardanelles, at the Naval Science Commission and at Tripoli as a naval officer after 1892. He started to work at the General Staff, Naval Department Translation Office with his teacher and the famous Turkist Miralay Saffet Bey in 1906.

He started to work on his naval history research in 1909 when he retired with the rank of lieutenant. After the invasion of İstanbul, he moved to Ankara with his family and worked as an English translator at the Press Department. He became head of the branch office of the Shipping Chamber of Commerce in İstanbul to where he returned in 1926. His articles and poems were published in newspapers and reviews such as Şehbâl, Tasvir-i Efkar, Donanma, Sabah, etc.

== Works ==
=== Poetry ===
- Muazzez Vatana (For the Beloved Country, 1913).

=== Novels ===
- Hayat-ı Alûde (Complicated Life, 1900)
- Kazıklı Voyvoda (Dracula, 1928) - later filmed as Drakula Istanbul'da (Dracula in Istanbul) (1953).
- Deli Aslan (The Mad Lion, 1933)
- Çocuk Kahraman Durakoğlu Demir (The Hero Kid Durakoğlu Demir, 1934)
- Bozkırların Kurtları (The Wolves of the Steppes, 1935)
- Bayram Reis (Bayram Reis, 1935).

=== History ===
- Muharebâtı Bahriye-i Osmaniye Zeyli (Appendices to the Ottoman Navy Wars, 1899)
- Turgut Reis (Turgut Reis, 1899)
- Çanakkale Boğazı (Dardanelles, 1900)
- Kemal Reis ve Baba Oruç (Kemal Reis ve Baba Oruç, 1909)
- Barbaros Hayrettin (Barbaros Hayrettin, 1910)
- Kırım Harbi'nde Kars Niçin Düştü? (Why Did Kars Fall in the Crimean War, 1913)
- Kafkasya'nın Ruslar Tarafından İstilası Tarihi (The History of the Invasion of Caucasus by the Russians, 1917)
- Gazi ve İnkılap (Atatürk and the Revolution, 1933)
- İskitler ve İskitler Hakkında Heredot'un Verdiği Bilgiler (The Scythians and Information on the Scythians Given by Herodot, 1934)
- Kurtuluş ve Kurtuluş Savaşı Üzerindeki Yazılarım (My Articles on Independence and the Independence War, 1934)
- Türklük Demek Kahramanlık Demektir (Being a Turk Means Being a Hero, 1940)
- Attlee (Attlee, 1945)
