= Bitter Life (film) =

1962 film

- Directed by: Metin Erksan
- Starring: Ayhan Işık; Türkan Şoray
- Release date: 1962
- Running time: 1h 36min
- Country: Turkey
- Language: Turkish

Bitter Life (Turkish: Acı Hayat) is a 1962 Turkish drama film directed by Metin Erksan.

== Plot ==
Acı Hayat (Bitter Life) tells the story of Mehmet and Nermin, who are in love. Mehmet, a welder in a shipyard, and Nermin, a manicurist, dream of marriage and a happy home, but cannot find an affordable house. When Nermin's hopes for marriage are dashed, she meets Ender, the son of a wealthy family, who proposes immediately. Nermin, tired of her slum life, accepts, though Ender's family disapproves. After these events, Nermin regrets leaving Mehmet and wants to return to him. However, Mehmet, unable to accept that she left him for a wealthy man, plots revenge.

== Cast ==
- Ayhan Işık - Mehmet
- Türkan Şoray - Nermin
- Ekrem Bora - Ender
- Nebahat Çehre - Filiz
- Hüseyin Baradan - Hasan
- Handan Adalı - Belkıs
