= Nazan Şoray =

Turkish singer and actress

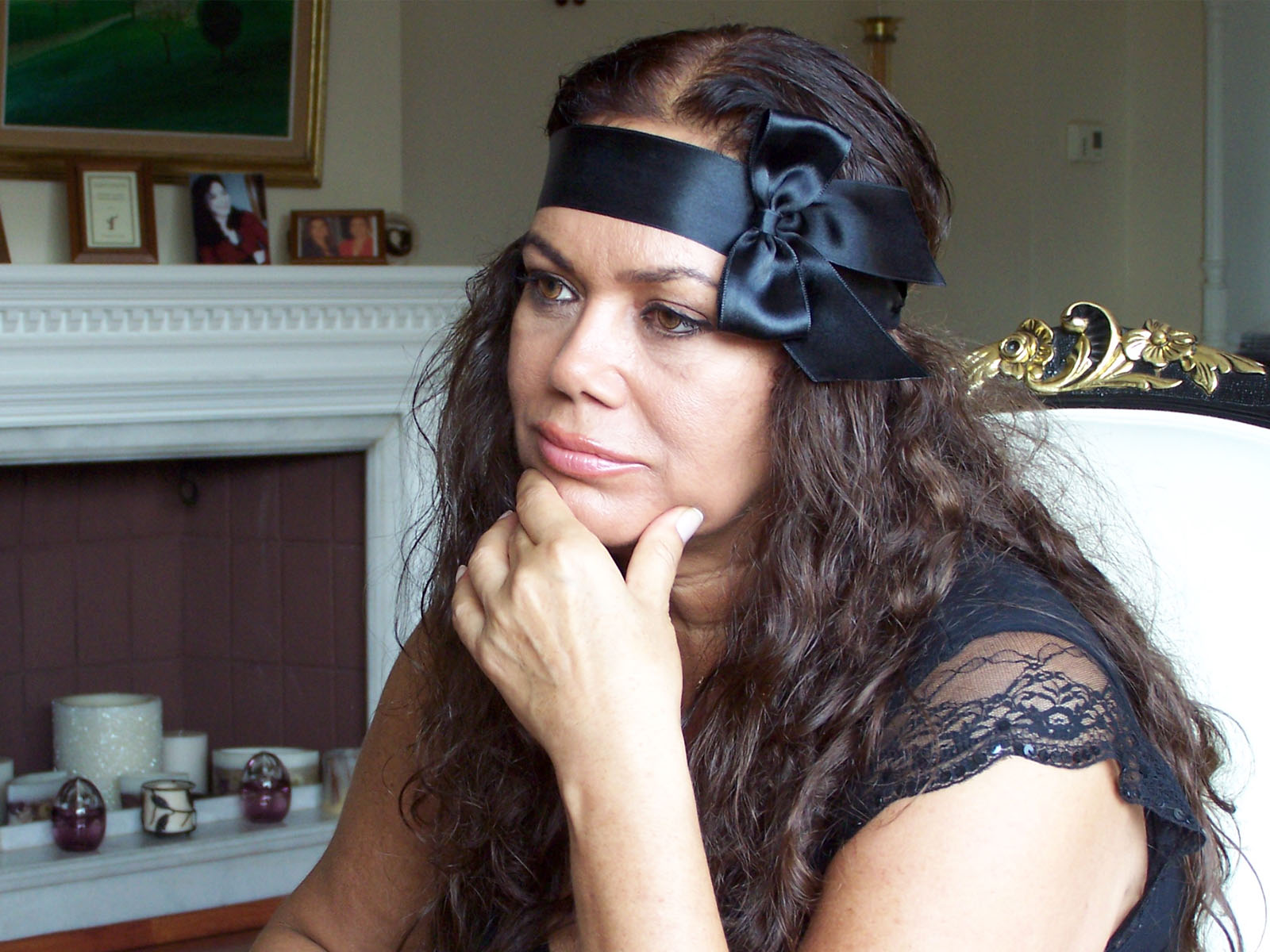
- Born: 5 January 1954 (age 72); Istanbul, Turkey
- Occupations: Singer, actress
- Years active: 1968–present
- Relatives: Türkan Şoray (sister)

Nazan Şoray (born 5 January 1954) is a Turkish singer and actress.

== Life and career ==
Şoray was born in Istanbul as the daughter of Halit Şoray, a civil servant in state railways, and Meliha Şoray, a housewife, who divorced when she was 5 years old. She is the younger sister of acclaimed Turkish film actress Türkan Şoray. She initially started her career in 1968 by appearing in movies but by early 1980s she began releasing music. Şoray has appeared in more than 30 movies. She made her cinematic debut at the age of 14 with "Cesur Yabancı, in which she shared the leading role with Yılmaz Duru. She is best known for her role in the movies Acı Günler and Balayı. Şoray started her music career by releasing the song "Sana Merhaba Dedim", written and composed by Selami Şahin. She further rose to prominence with the song "Hal Hal", composed by Barış Manço. It was a commercial success and sold various copies in Turkey. Şoray went on hiatus in mid 1990s but returned to making music and released the album Mültecin Olayım in 2011.

== Discography ==
=== Albums ===
- Teselliye Sen Gerek (1981)
- Dünyanın Sekizinci Harikası (1984)
- Naz Dudaklım (1991)
- Deli Rüya (1994)

=== 45rpm and singles ===
- Sevmiyor Derlerse Sakın İnanma / Çocuk mu Sandın Beni (1970)
- Merhaba Dedim / Pişman Olsan Da (1978)
- Seninle Doğmak / Yalnızlık (1979)
- Hal Hal / İyi Diyelim İyi Olalım (1980)
- Mültecin Olayım (2011)
- Olay Bu (2014)
- Steril Sevda (2016)
- İçimde Fırtınalar (2019)
- Adrese Teslim (2021)

== Filmography ==
Sinema
Year	Title	Role	Notes
1968	Yakılacak Kitap	Vicdan	
1968	Cesur Yabancı		
1968	Azize	Azize	
1968	Yedi Köyün Zeynebi	Zeynep	
1969	Yuvasızlar	Nevin	
1969	Söyleyin Anama Ağlamasın	Gülten	
1969	Yaşayan Hatıralar	Dilek	
1969	Cezaları Ölümdü		
1969	Mihracenin Gözdesi		
1969	Garibin Mezarını Taştan Oyun		
1969	Dönüşü Olmayan Yol		
1969	Kapıcının Kızı	Leyla	
1969	Allı Gelin		
1969	Sevdalı Gelin		
1969	Dost Hançeri		
1970	Ölüm Pazarı		
1970	Öldürmeya Yeminliyim		
1970	Yazı mı Tura mı		
1970	On Kadına Bir Erkek		
1970	Kan ve Kurşun		
1970	Kan Kusturacağım	Selma	
1970	Kaderin Oyunu	Hülya	
1970	Kaderiml		
1970	Babaların Günahı		
1970	Aşk Sürgünü		
1970	Anadolu Kini	Nazlı	
1970	Amber		
1971	Şahinler Diyarı		
1971	Vurguncular	Nazan	
1971	Newyorklu Kız	Güner	
1971	Kirli Eller		
1971	Katil Kim	Şarkıcı Ayla	
1971	Afacan Küçük Serseri	Konuk Oyuncu	
1972	Yirmi Yıl Sonra	Tülay	
1975	Kazım'a Ne Lazım		
1981	Acı Günler	Aysel	
1984	Balayı	Sema	

=== Theatre ===
- Üvey Karım – 2009

== See also ==
- Nazan Saatci
