= Ahmet Esat Tomruk =

Turkish spy (1892-1966)

Ahmet Esat Tomruk (1892 - 14 February 1966) was a Turkish spy better known as "İngiliz Kemal" [Kemal, the Englishman] in Turkey.

Tomruk was born in 1892 in Istanbul. At the age of five, his father Mehmet Reşit Bey had died, and he continued living with his mother Sıdıka Hanım and his uncle Sezai Bey. Sezai Bey enrolled him in Galatasaray High School where he studied. In his school years he practiced Italian, Greek, English and French by exchanging letters with Young Turks who had fled to Europe. Kemal fled Turkey as a teenager because his uncle feared for his well-being after exchanging letters with prominent Young Turks, such as Ahmet Rıza. Abdul Hamid II had a vast network of informants, and his repeated visits to the post office attracted their attention and led them to intercept the communications. He was released after interrogation at the Yıldız Palace, but his uncle worried for his safety as he was still being watched by agents working for the Sultan. His uncle paid a Jewish man to put him as a stowaway in a ship headed for England. He was later discovered and raised by the captain of the ship he fled in, who adopted him as a son. He learned English and continued his education. He later became a boxer and fought bouts in Paris. During the First World War, he returned to Turkey and fought in the Gallipoli campaign as an Ottoman officer. He was arrested after being AWOL (he had exceeded a medical absence after being sick in Gallipoli and failed to report back to duty), court-martialed, and jailed. While in jail, he learned pickpocketing from a famous Greek thief in jail, a skill that would serve him well as a spy later on. Eventually, he was recruited by Ottoman military intelligence and worked for the Special Organization due to his language skills and being able to pass as a European. He posed as a British POW and was tasked with gathering information from British POW general Charles Townshend. After World War 1, several Committee of Union and Progress members were imprisoned in Istanbul by the occupying forces. Kemal tried to rescue some of them, but ended up failing and getting imprisoned himself, and tortured. After being transferred to a POW camp in Çanakkale, he managed to escape. Upon escaping, he joined Kuva-yi Milliye, helping them fight Kuva-yi Inzibatiye (loyalist forces), specifically forces commanded by Anzavur Ahmet Pasha. Later in the Turkish Independence War, he went to Ankara, and joined the Turkish army military intelligence, and at one point briefed Mustafa Kemal. He was ordered to infiltrate an encampment of the Greek Army posing as an American journalist. At one point, he interviewed the Greek Army chief of staff Anastasios Papoulas. He was later caught after one of Çerkes Ethem's men, who had defected to the Greeks in the war, recognized him. He was imprisoned in Greece, but managed to escape again and returned to Turkey. The war had ended, and he worked as tour guide and translator, and fought in boxing matches, retaining the Turkish lightweight boxing title.

Tomruk was featured in the 1952 film "İngiliz Kemal Lawrense Karşı", and the 1968 "Ingiliz Kemal".

In 1964, the Grand National Assembly of Turkey passed a law specifically paying him a pension, as a "hero of the national struggle". He had a stroke in 1964, and suffered partial paralysis. He escaped from hospitals, due to trauma from prior imprisonment. Suffering a brain hemmorage, he died in 1966.

Intelligence reports on him drafted by the MAH in 1940 (nowadays called MİT) were released in 2025. The report stated him and his mistress had offered their services to British intelligence and while acknowledging that he had been useful in the past as an intelligence source, stated that the intelligence agency had ceased contact with him since he was "not sincere or honest", and a "drunk and a gambler".
