= Annie Ball =

English social reformer (1869–1970)

Annie Ball MBE
- Ball in 1970
- Born: Annie Stamp; 10 October 1869; Kislingbury, Northamptonshire, England
- Died: 3 February 1970 (aged 100); Northampton, England
- Occupations: Social reformer; businessperson
- Political party: Labour Party
- Spouse: Harry Arthur Ball (m. 1897; died 1947)
- Children: 4
- Awards: Member of the Order of the British Empire (1965)

Annie Ball MBE (née Stamp; 10 October 1869 – 3 February 1970) was an English social reformer and businessperson. She was active in socialist, temperance, and food reform circles, and she and her husband opened Northampton's first health food store in 1910.

== Biography ==
Ball was born on 10 October 1869 at Kislingbury, Northamptonshire, the first of five children. Her parents were Thomas and Elizabeth Stamp. Her father was described in The British Vegetarian as a Radical, and took her to hear Charles Bradlaugh, then the Member of Parliament for Northampton.

She married Harry Arthur Ball in 1897. While living in Leeds, she attended meetings addressed by Keir Hardie, Ramsay MacDonald and Philip Snowden, and became a socialist. According to The British Vegetarian, Ball's sister Bertha, who had married Milton Powell, influenced her interest in food reform; Ball, her husband and their four children became vegetarians before 1900. The same account described Ball as a temperance advocate.

In 1910, the family returned to Northampton and opened the town's first health food store. Their shop and house were used by people involved in reform movements, and visitors included James Maxton, Fenner Brockway, Bernarr Macfadden and George Allen. During the First World War, Ball had 12 soldiers billeted with her in 1914. The health food store later closed after a rival shop opened in a better location and her husband was directed to war work in 1917.

Milton Powell later introduced Ball's husband to nature cure and osteopathy. He practised until his health failed in 1946 and died in 1947. The practice was then taken over by Ball's eldest son, Harold Ball. Her youngest son remained in the Army and became a major. Ball later worked as Harold Ball's honorary receptionist, and her home continued to receive Labour and socialist visitors, including Edith Summerskill, Alice Bacon, Bessie Braddock and Margaret Bondfield.

Ball was appointed Member of the Order of the British Empire in the 1965 Birthday Honours for her political work in Northampton. The British Vegetarian reported that she was taken to Buckingham Palace to receive the award at the age of 96.

Ball died in Northampton on 3 February 1970, aged 100.

== See also ==
- History of socialism
- Socialism in the United Kingdom
- Temperance movement in the United Kingdom
- History of vegetarianism
- Women and vegetarianism and veganism advocacy
- Vegetarianism in the United Kingdom
