= Olcay Turhan =

German footballer

Personal information
- Date of birth: 30 January 1988 (age 38)
- Place of birth: Münster, West Germany
- Position: Midfielder

Team information
- Current team: SV Lippstadt 08

Youth career
- SV Werl-Aspe
- –2007: Arminia Bielefeld

Senior career*
Years	Team	Apps	(Gls)
2007–2008	Arminia Bielefeld II	12	(1)
2008–2009	SC Wiedenbrück 2000		
2009–2010	Fortuna Düsseldorf II	16	(1)
2010–2011	SC Herford		
2011–	Arminia Bielefeld	1	(0)
2013–	→ Wacker Burghausen	1	(0)
- * Club domestic league appearances and goals as of August 21, 2012

Olcay Turhan (born 30 January 1988) is a German footballer who plays for Arminia Bielefeld. He made his debut for the club in the final game of the 2011–12 3. Fußball-Liga season against Werder Bremen II.
