= The Victory Sun =

- Directed by: Seyfi Havaeri
- Written by: Seyfi Havaeri
- Produced by: Mukbil Sanver
- Starring: Seyfi Havaeri
- Cinematography: Cezmi Ar
- Production company: Sanver Film
- Release date: 1953
- Running time: 91 minutes
- Country: Turkey
- Language: Turkish

The Victory Sun (Turkish: Zafer Güneşi) is a 1953 Turkish drama film directed by and starring Seyfi Havaeri.

== Cast ==
- Seyfi Havaeri
- Fatma Andaç
- Atıf Kaptan
- Hüseyin Kaşif
- Lebibe Çakin
- Nuri Akinci
- Ziya Aygen
- Nalan Küçük
- Hikmet Serçe
- Leman Tekmen
- Rıza Tüzün
- Necabettin Yal
- Faruk Yüce

== Bibliography ==
- Burçak Evren. Türk sinema sanatçıları ansiklopedisi. Film-San Vakfı Yayınları, 1983.
