= Turkish Authors' Association =

Turkish literary and cultural association

- Türkiye Yazarlar Birliği
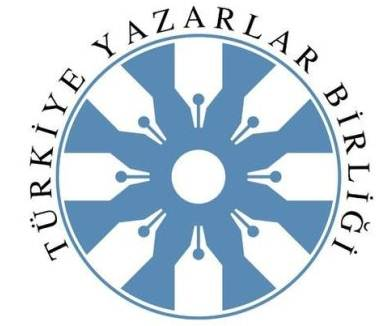
- Emblem of the association
- Abbreviation: TYB
- Formation: 7 August 1978; 47 years ago
- Type: Non-profit literary and cultural association
- Legal status: Association working for the public benefit
- Purpose: Literature, culture and the arts
- Headquarters: Ankara, Turkey
- Official language: Turkish
- Website: www.tyb.org.tr

The Turkish Authors' Association (Turkish: Türkiye Yazarlar Birliği, abbreviated TYB; also translated as the Writers Union of Turkey) is a non-profit literary and cultural association based in Ankara, Turkey. It was founded on 7 August 1978 under the name Yazarlar Birliği ("Writers' Union") and adopted its present name in 1985. In 1991, it was granted the status of an association working for the public benefit.

The organization is sometimes confused with the Turkish Writers' Union (Türkiye Yazarlar Sendikası), since the names of both organizations may be translated into English as the "Writers Union of Turkey". Unlike the Turkish Writers' Union, however, TYB is an association rather than a trade union.

== Activities and publications ==
The association organizes conferences, panel discussions, poetry readings, commemorative meetings, symposia and educational programmes on literature, language, culture, history and the arts. These activities are conducted at its headquarters in Ankara and through its branches and local representatives.

Since 1980, TYB has conducted an annual assessment known as the Yılın Yazar, Fikir Adamı ve Sanatçıları ("Writers, Thinkers and Artists of the Year"). Awards are presented in categories including poetry, short stories, novels, literary criticism, research, translation, publishing, periodicals, radio, television and other forms of cultural production.

TYB has published the annual Türkiye Kültür ve Sanat Yıllığı ("Turkey Culture and Arts Yearbook") since 1984. The yearbook surveys developments in Turkish literature, publishing, thought, culture and the arts during the preceding year. The association also publishes the Türkiye Kültür ve Sanat Bülteni ("Turkey Culture and Arts Bulletin"), as well as books arising from its conferences, symposia and other cultural programmes.

Among the association's principal international activities is the Türkçenin Uluslararası Şiir Şöleni ("International Poetry Festival of the Turkish Language"). The first festival was held in Bursa and Konya in 1992 and brought together more than 100 Turkish-language poets from 21 countries. Subsequent festivals have been held in cities in Europe and Central Asia. Poems presented at the festivals have also been published in the anthology series Türk Dünyası Şiir Güldestesi ("Anthology of Poetry from the Turkic World").

TYB also runs the Yazar Okulu ("Writers' School"), an educational programme that combines courses in literature, writing, aesthetics, philosophy, society and politics. It has additionally organized continuing reading programmes devoted to major works of Turkish literature, including Mehmet Akif Ersoy's Safahat, Necip Fazıl Kısakürek's Çile, Ahmet Hamdi Tanpınar's Beş Şehir and Rumi's Masnavi.
