= Seyfi Havaeri =

Turkish actor, film director and screenwriter

- Born: 18 July 1920; Istanbul, Ottoman Empire
- Died: 24 January 2009 (aged 88); Istanbul, Turkey
- Occupations: Actor, Director, Writer
- Years active: 1947–1986 (film)

Seyfi Havaeri (17 July 1920 – 24 January 2009) was a Turkish actor, screenwriter and film director.

== Selected filmography ==
- Damga (1948)
- The Victory Sun (1953)

== Bibliography ==
- Gönül Dönmez-Colin. The Routledge Dictionary of Turkish Cinema. Routledge, 2013.
