= Turgut Demirağ =

Turkish film producer

- Born: 13 December 1921; Sivas, Turkey
- Died: 14 January 1987 (aged 65); Istanbul, Turkey
- Occupations: Film producer, film director, screenwriter
- Years active: 1947–1973
- Spouse(s): Rüçhan Çamay; Afet Tuğbay
- Children: 3, including Melike Demirağ

Turgut Demirağ (13 December 1921 – 14 January 1987) was a Turkish film producer, director, and screenwriter. He directed 16 films between 1947 and 1973. His 1964 film Love and Grudge was entered into the 4th Moscow International Film Festival.

== Selected filmography ==
- Love and Grudge (1964)
