= 11th Berlin International Film Festival =

1961 film festival in West Berlin, Germany

- Festival poster
- Location: West Berlin, Germany
- Founded: 1951
- Awards: Golden Bear: La Notte
- Festival date: 23 June–4 July 1961
- Website: Website

Berlin International Film Festival chronology
- 12th 10th

The 11th annual Berlin International Film Festival was held from 23 June to 4 July 1961.

The Golden Bear was awarded to the Italian film La Notte directed by Michelangelo Antonioni.

== Juries ==
The following people were announced as being on the jury for the festival:

=== Main Competition ===
- James Quinn, British producer - Jury President
- France Roche, French journalist, film critic, actress and screenwriter
- Marc Turfkruyer, Belgian film critic
- Satyajit Ray, Indian filmmaker
- Gian Luigi Rondi, Italian film critic
- Hirotsugu Ozaki, Japanese theatre critic
- Nicholas Ray, American filmmaker
- Falk Harnack, West-German filmmaker
- Hans Schaarwächter, West-German journalist and writer

=== Documentary and Short Films Competition ===
- Willem de Vogel, Dutch actor - Jury President
- Else Goelz, West-German journalist
- Mohammed Gamal Eldin Rifaat, Emirati
- Luis Gómez Mesa, Spanish film critic and writer
- Max Lippmann, West-German film critic
- Ingeborg Lyche, Norwegian chairperson of the Statens Filmsentral
- Flávio R. Tambellini, Brazilian producer

== Official Sections ==
=== Main Competition ===
The following films were in competition for the Golden Bear award:

English title	Original title	Director(s)	Production Country
14,000 Witnesses	證人 萬 四千 個 證人	Wang Hao	Taiwan, Hong Kong
Amelie or The Time to Love	Amélie ou le Temps d'aimer	Michel Drach	France
Antigone	Aντιγόνη	Yorgos Javellas	Greece
Anuradha	अनुराधा	Hrishikesh Mukherjee	India
The Assassin	L'assassino	Elio Petri	Italy, France
A Woman Is a Woman	Une femme est une femme	Jean-Luc Godard	France
The Bad Sleep Well	悪い奴ほどよく眠る	Akira Kurosawa	Japan
Black Silk	Prae dum	Rattana Pestonji and Ratanavadi Ratanabhand	Thailand
The Broken Pots	Kırık Çanaklar	Memduh Ün	Turkey
The Coachman	마부	Kang Dae-jin	South Korea
The End of the Cancageiros	A Morte Comanda o Cangaço	Carlos Coimbra and Walter Guimares Motta	Brazil
Five Day Lover	L'Amant de cinq jours	Philippe de Broca	France, Italy
La Notte		Michelangelo Antonioni	Italy, France
La patota		Daniel Tinayre	Argentina
Macbeth		George Schaefer	United States, United Kingdom
The Marriage of Mr. Mississippi	Die Ehe des Herrn Mississippi	Kurt Hoffmann	West Germany, Switzerland
The Miracle of Father Malachia	Das Wunder des Malachias	Bernhard Wicki	Austria
No Love for Johnnie		Ralph Thomas	United Kingdom
The Pleasure of His Company		George Seaton	United States
Question 7		Stuart Rosenberg	United States, West Germany
Romanoff and Juliet		Peter Ustinov	United States
The Scarlet Dove	Tulipunainen kyyhkynen	Matti Kassila	Finland
Teenagers	Almurahikat	Ahmed Diaa Eddine	Egypt
That Joyous Eve	Makkers Staakt uw Wild Geraas	Fons Rademakers	Netherlands
Two Loves		Charles Walters	United States
Young People	Los jóvenes	Luis Alcoriza	Mexico
Zone of Danger	I faresonen	Bjørn Breigutu	Norway

=== Documentary and Short Films Competition ===
English title	Original title	Director(s)	Production Country
A Country Called Chile	Un país llamado Chile	B.H. Hardy	Chile
Chimichimito		José Martín	Venezuela
Dreamland of Desire	Traumland der Sehnsucht	Wolfgang Müller-Sehn	West Germany, Greece
Gesicht von der Stange?		Raimund Ruehl	West Germany
Hold Back the Sea	De lage landen	George Sluizer	Netherlands
Lo specchio, la tigre e la pianura		Raffaele Andreassi	Italy
Morning on the Lièvre		David Bairstow	Canada
Third Side of the Coin	Description d'un combat	Chris Marker	France, Israel
Sirènes		Emile Degelin	Belgium

== Official Awards ==
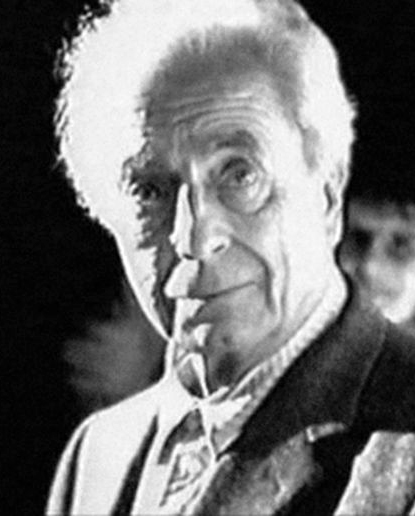
Michelangelo Antonioni, winner of the Golden Bear at the event

The following prizes were awarded by the Jury:

=== Main Competition ===
- Golden Bear: La Notte by Michelangelo Antonioni
- Silver Bear: Makkers Staakt uw Wild Geraas by Fons Rademakers
- Silver Bear for Best Director: Bernhard Wicki for The Miracle of Father Malachia
- Silver Bear for Best Actress: Anna Karina for A Woman Is a Woman
- Silver Bear for Best Actor: Peter Finch for No Love for Johnnie
- Silver Bear Extraordinary Jury Prize: The Coachman by Kang Dae-jin
- Silver Bear Extraordinary Jury Prize: A Woman Is a Woman by Jean-Luc Godard

=== Documentary and Short Films Competition ===
- Golden Bear (Documentaries): Third Side of the Coin by Chris Marker
- Silver Bear special prize (Documentaries): Dreamland of Desire by Wolfgang Müller-Sehn
- Short Film Golden Bear: Gesicht von der Stange? by Raimund Ruehl
- Silver Bear for Best Short Film: Chimichimito by José Martín
- Silver Bear Extraordinary Jury Prize (Short film):
  - Hold Back the Sea by George Sluizer
  - Lo specchio, la tigre e la pianura by Raffaele Andreassi
  - Sirènes by Emile Degelin
  - Morning on the Lièvre by David Bairstow

== Independent Awards ==
=== FIPRESCI Award ===
- La Notte by Michelangelo Antonioni

=== OCIC Award ===
- Question 7 by Stuart Rosenberg

=== C.I.D.A.L.C. Award ===
- La patota by Daniel Tinayre

=== Youth Film Award ===
- Best Feature Film Suitable for Young People: Question 7 by Stuart Rosenberg
- Best Documentary Film Suitable for Young People: Third Side of the Coin by Chris Marker
- Best Short Film Suitable for Young People: Hold Back the Sea by George Sluizer
  - Honorable Mention: Gesicht von der Stange? by Raimund Ruehl
