= Ekrem Bora =

Turkish actor

- Born: Ekrem Şerif Uçak; 7 March 1934; Ankara, Turkey
- Died: 1 April 2012 (aged 78); Istanbul, Turkey
- Occupation: Film actor
- Years active: 1956–2010
- Spouse: Gül Bora (m. 1965)
- Children: 3

Ekrem Bora (born Ekrem Şerif Uçak; 7 March 1934 – 1 April 2012) was a Turkish film actor.

== Biography ==
After finishing school, he went to Sultanahmet State Printinghouse where he got a diploma in typesetting and binding. In 1953, he participated in and won the "Sinema Artist" competition held by Sezai Solelli's Yıldız (Star) magazine. Bora made his film debut in Alın Yazısı in 1955. After leaving acting for two years, he returned as the leading actor in Mavi Boncuk and went on to appear in nearly 150 films. He won the Golden Orange award for Best Actor twice; first in 1966 for his role in Sürtük, and second in 1991 for Soğuktu Ve Yağmur Çiseliyordu.

On 1 April 2012 he died in hospital in Istanbul, aged 78, from a pulmonary edema. and was laid to rest at the Zincirlikuyu Cemetery on 3 April 2012.
