= Memduh Ün =

Turkish film producer

- Born: Arif Memduh Ün; 14 March 1920; Kasımpaşa, Istanbul, Ottoman Empire (now Turkey)
- Died: 16 October 2015 (aged 95); Bodrum, Turkey
- Occupations: Film producer, film director
- Years active: 1948–2005
- Spouse: Cahide Şen (m. 1949)
- Partner: Fatma Girik
- Children: 2

Arif Memduh Ün (14 March 1920 – 16 October 2015) was a Turkish film producer, director, actor and screenwriter. His film, The Broken Pots, was entered into the 11th Berlin International Film Festival.

== Selected filmography ==
- The Broken Pots (1960)
