= The Homeless Children =

1953 film

- Directed by: Renan Fosforoğlu
- Produced by: Ömer Aykut
- Cinematography: Manasi Filmeridis
- Production company: Ömay Film
- Release date: 26 March 1953
- Country: Turkey
- Language: Turkish

The Homeless Children (Turkish: Köprüaltı Çocukları) is a 1953 Turkish drama film directed by Renan Fosforoğlu.

== Cast ==
- Güner Çelme
- Renan Fosforoğlu
- Fikret Hakan
- Vahi Öz
- Yıldız Erdem
- Halit Akçatepe
- Sıtkı Akçatepe
- Kemal Emin Bara
- Belkis Dilligil
- Mürüvet Sim
- Mualla Sürer
- İnci Tamay
- Feridun Çölgeçen
- Ayhan Işık as Nazim
- Gülistan Güzey as Ayten
- Muzaffer Tema as Halil
- Pola Morelli as Perihan
- Talat Artemel as Şevket
- Nese Yulaç as Nezahat
- Settar Körmükçü as Kamil
- Nubar Terziyan as Mahmut
- Muazzez Arçay as Zehra
- Temel Karamahmut as Polis Sefi
- Renan Fosforoglu
- Sadettin Erbil as Komiser
- Riza Tüzün as Doktor
- Kerim Pamukoglu
- Mümtaz Alpaslan
- Kani Kıpçak as Bayram
- Reşit Gürzap as Abuzer
- Müfit Kiper as Ak Mustafa
- Sadri Alışık as Tema Bey
- Cahit Irgat as ibrahim
- Vedat Örfi Bengü as Kenan
- Cahide Sonku as Aysel
- Adile Naşit as Adile
- Hulusi Kentmen as Reşit Ağa
- Fikret Hakan as Hakan

== Bibliography ==
- Türker İnanoğlu. 5555 afişle Türk Sineması. Kabalcı, 2004.
