= The Killer (1953 film) =

- Directed by: Lütfi Akad
- Written by: Lütfi Akad; Osman F. Seden
- Produced by: Osman F. Seden
- Starring: Ayhan Isik Gülistan Güzey Neriman Köksal Muazzez Arçay Necla Sertel Zaruhi Degirmenci Sevki Artun Nubar Terziyan Riza Tüzün Mualla Sürer Hamdi Sarligil Fikri Çöze Sadettin Erbil Kemal Tözem Erkan Baydemir Fadil Garan Turan Seyfioglu Müfit Kiper Kani Kıpçak
- Cinematography: Kriton Ilyadis
- Production company: Kemal Film
- Release date: 1953
- Running time: 89 minutes
- Country: Turkey
- Language: Turkish

The Killer (Turkish: Katil) is a 1953 Turkish adventure film directed by Lütfi Akad and starring Ayhan Isik, Gülistan Güzey and Neriman Köksal.

The story is about a man imprisoned for a crime he did not commit. He escapes from prison to prove his innocence and find his wife who he has no news of since being jailed.

== Cast ==
- Ayhan Isik as Kemal
- Gülistan Güzey as Nevin
- Neriman Köksal as Süheyla
- Muazzez Arçay as Huriye
- Necla Sertel as Nermin
- Zaruhi Degirmenci
- Sevki Artun
- Nubar Terziyan as Nuri
- Riza Tüzün as Süleyman
- Mualla Sürer as Çamasirhane Yöneticisi
- Hamdi Sarligil as Hamdi
- Fikri Çöze
- Sadettin Erbil as Emniyet Sube Müdürü
- Kemal Tözem as Hakim
- Erkan Baydemir as Turhan
- Fadil Garan as Tahir
- Turan Seyfioglu as Muzaffer Durak

== Bibliography ==
- Gönül Dönmez-Colin. The Routledge Dictionary of Turkish Cinema. Routledge, 2013.
