= Murderous City =

- Directed by: Lütfi Akad
- Written by: Orhan Hançerlioglu
- Produced by: Osman F. Seden
- Starring: Ayhan Işık; Belgin Doruk; Sevki Artun; Neşet Berküren; Müfit Kiper
- Cinematography: Kriton Ilyadis
- Production company: Kemal Film
- Release date: 1953
- Country: Turkey
- Language: Turkish

Murderous City (Turkish: Öldüren Şehir) is a 1953 Turkish drama film directed by Lütfi Akad and starring Ayhan Işık, Belgin Doruk and Sevki Artun.

== Cast ==
- Ayhan Işık as Ali
- Belgin Doruk as Selma
- Sevki Artun as Hikmet
- Muazzez Arçay as Hatice
- Nuri Beyat
- Settar Körmükçü as Kaptan
- Ziya Metin as Ziya Metin
- Pola Morelli as Nesrin
- Kenan Pars as Kenan
- Kadir Savun
- Turan Seyfioğlu as Sevket
- Mualla Sürer
- Nubar Terziyan as Osman
- Müfit Kiper as Abuzer Baba
- Neşet Berküren as Muhsin Baba
- Cahit Irgat as Cahit Bey
- Sadri Alışık as Natoras
- Hulusi Kentmen as Yavuz

== Bibliography ==
- Gönül Dönmez-Colin. The Routledge Dictionary of Turkish Cinema. Routledge, 2013.
