= Şaka ile Karışık =

- Directed by: Osman F. Seden
- Starring: Sadri Alışık; Filiz Akın; Cahit Irgat; Öztürk Serengil; Yılmaz Güney; Tanju Gürsu; Cahide Sonku; Müfit Kiper
- Release date: 15 March 1965
- Running time: 100 minutes
- Country: Turkey
- Language: Turkish

Şaka ile Karışık is a 1965 Turkish comedy film directed by Osman F. Seden.

== Cast ==
- Sadri Alışık as Ofsayt Osman
- Filiz Akın as Şarkıcı Filiz
- Ajda Pekkan as Ayla
- Efgan Efekan as Yazar Kemal
- Kadir Savun as Hüsrev Ağa
- Vahi Öz as Cellat Nuri
- Aziz Basmacı
- Hüseyin Baradan
- Nubar Terziyan
- Hulusi Kentmen as Hulisi
