= A Handful of Soil =

- Directed by: Osman F. Seden
- Screenplay by: Osman F. Seden
- Produced by: Osman F. Seden
- Starring: Ayhan Işık; Pervin Par; Turgut Özatay; Ayhan Işık; Atıf Kaptan; Nubar Terziyan; Talat Artemel; Müfit Kiper; Kani Kıpçak; Reşit Gürzap; Cahide Sonku; Cahit Irgat
- Cinematography: Kriton Ilyadis
- Production company: Kemal Film
- Release date: 1957
- Country: Turkey
- Language: Turkish

A Handful of Soil (Turkish: Bir Avuç Toprak) is a 1957 Turkish romantic drama film directed by Osman F. Seden. The stars of the film are Talat Artemel, Pervin Par, Turgut Özatay, Ayhan Işık, Atıf Kaptan, and Nubar Terziyan.
