= The Sob =

1953 film by Atıf Yılmaz

- Directed by: Atıf Yılmaz
- Written by: Kerime Nadir (novel); Atif Yılmaz
- Produced by: Hürrem Erman
- Starring: Muzaffer Tema; Nedret Güvenç; Temel Karamahmut; Leman Akçatepe; Osman Altınay; Muazzez Arçay; İhsan Aşkın; Abdullah Ataç; Fatma Bilgen; Karin Davutoğlu; Belkis Dilligil; Muazzez Dogan; Bilsev Etüs; Reşit Gürzap; Alev Koral; Settar Körmükçü; Tunç Nuyan; Nejat Saydam; Dursune Şirin; Yetvart Yeretzyan; Lebibe Çakin; Feridun Çölgeçen; Müfit Kiper; Kani Kıpçak; Cahide Sonku; Cahit Irgat; Ahmet Danyal Topatan; Neşet Berküren
- Cinematography: Mike Rafaelyan
- Music by: Sadi Işılay
- Production company: Erman Film
- Release date: 1953
- Country: Turkey
- Language: Turkish

The Sob (Turkish: Hıçkırık) is a 1953 Turkish drama film directed by Atıf Yılmaz.

== Cast ==
- Muzaffer Tema
- Nedret Güvenç as Nalan
- Temel Karamahmut
- Leman Akçatepe
- Osman Altınay
- Muazzez Arçay
- İhsan Aşkın
- Abdullah Ataç
- Fatma Bilgen
- Karin Davutoğlu
- Belkis Dilligil
- Muazzez Dogan
- Bilsev Etüs
- Reşit Gürzap
- Alev Koral
- Settar Körmükçü
- Tunç Nuyan
- Nejat Saydam
- Dursune Şirin
- Yetvart Yeretzyan
- Lebibe Çakin
- Feridun Çölgeçen
- Müfit Kiper
- Kani Kıpçak as Abuzer Baba
- Cahit Irgat as Umut
- Cahide Sonku as Aliye
- Belgin Doruk as Sevda

== Bibliography ==
- Gönül Dönmez-Colin. The Routledge Dictionary of Turkish Cinema. Routledge, 2013.
