= Zeki Müren =

Turkish singer, composer, songwriter, actor, and poet (1931–1996)

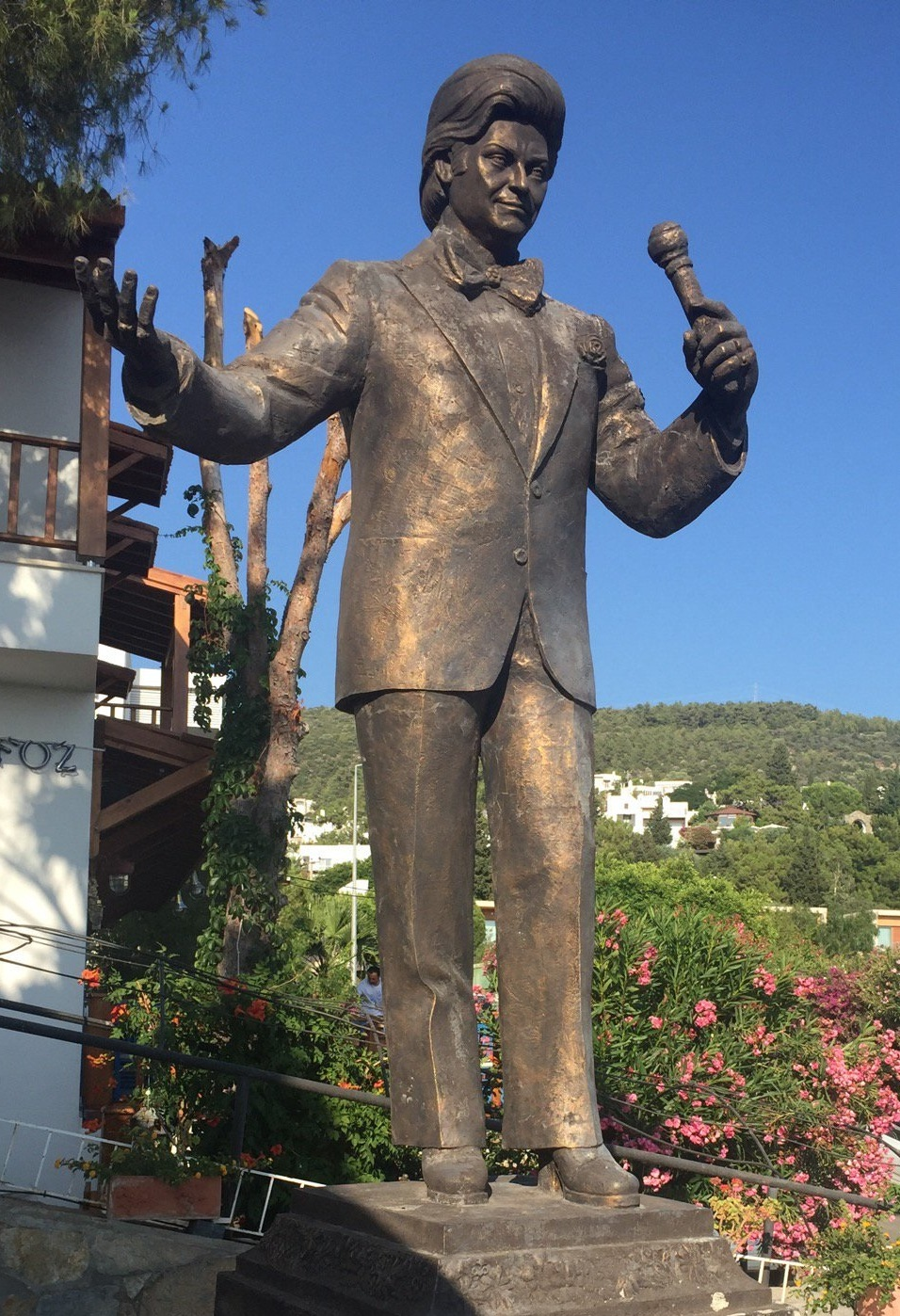
- The statue of Zeki Müren in front of his house in Bodrum, where he settled before his death.
- Born: 2 January 1931; Bursa, Turkey
- Died: 24 September 1996 (aged 65); İzmir, Turkey
- Education: Bursa Osmangazi School; Boğaziçi High School; Istanbul State Academy of Fine Arts
- Occupations: Singer; songwriter; actor
- Musical career
- Genre: Turkish classical music
- Years active: 1952–1996
- Label: Grafson Plak, Coşkun Plak LP, Kalan, Türküola LP, Minareci Kaset, Sahibinin Sesi Greece, Balkan Plak, Yavuz Plak, Lider Plak, Elenor LP

Zeki Müren (Turkish pronunciation: [zeˈci ˈmyɾæn]; 2 January 1931 (Note: Although Zeki Müren's official identity documents list his birth date as 2 January 1931, his actual birth date is 6 December 1930.) – 24 September 1996) was a Turkish classical music artist, composer, songwriter, actor and poet. Known by the nicknames "The Sun of Art" and "Pasha", he was one of the prominent figures of Turkish classical music. Due to his contributions to the art industry, he was named a "State Artist" in 1991. He was the first singer to receive a gold certification in Turkey and throughout his career recorded and released hundreds of songs on cassettes and phonograph records.

== Life and career ==
=== Childhood and education ===
Müren was born in the Hisar district of Bursa, at the wooden house number 30 on Ortapazar Road as the only child of Kaya and Hayriye Müren. His father was a timber merchant.

Müren went to the Bursa Osmangazi School (later Tophane School and Alkıncı School). When he was at school, his musical ability was discovered by his teachers and he started to have a prominent role at school musicals. His first ever role was the character of a shepherd in one of these musicals.

He finished his secondary school in Bursa and then asked his father to let him go to Istanbul. There he attended the Istanbul Boğaziçi High School. He finished the school and ended up as the number-one student. After passing his exams, he was enrolled at the Istanbul State Academy of Fine Arts (now Mimar Sinan University) where he studied decorative arts from 1950 to 1953.

=== Music career ===
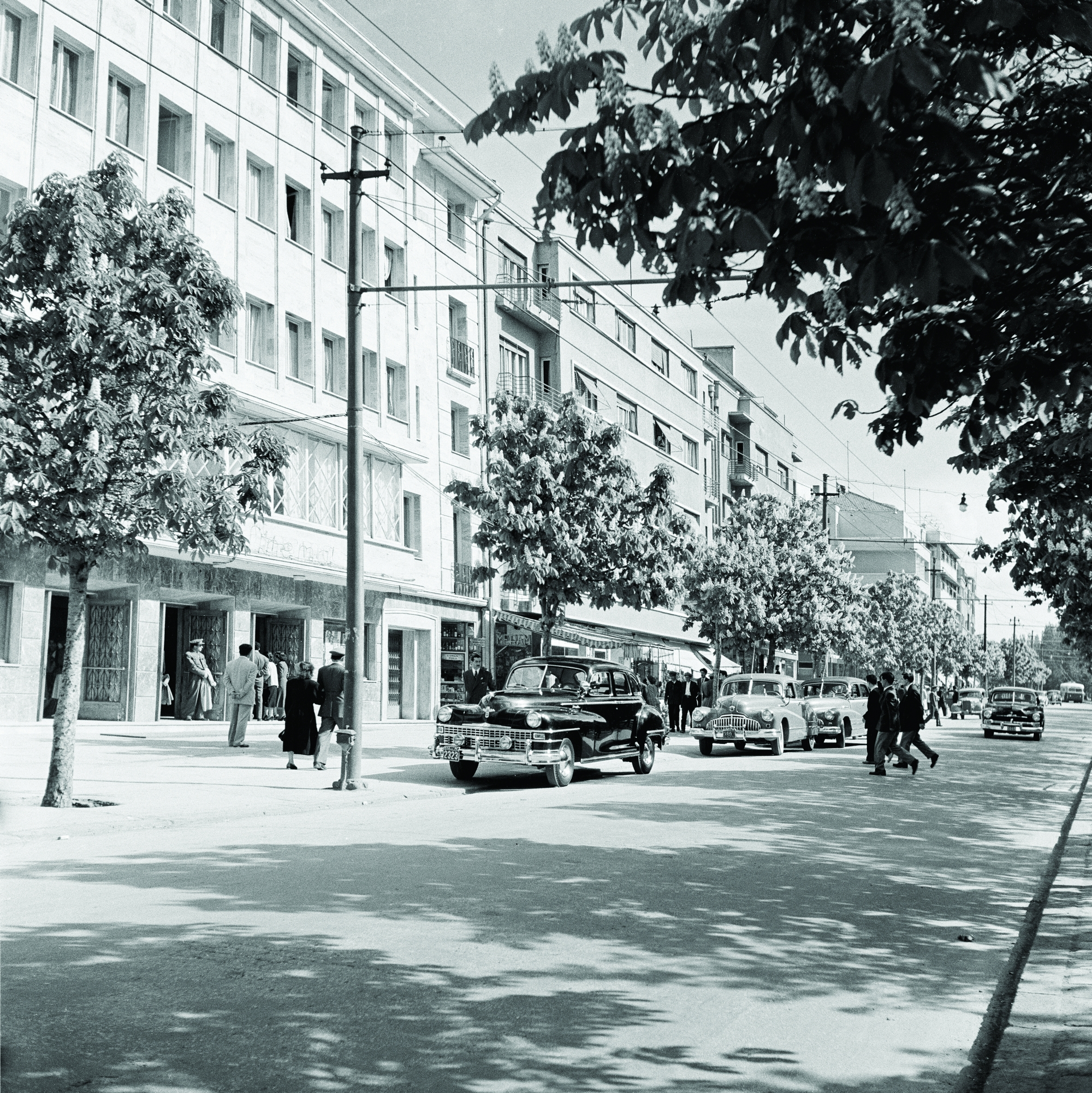
On 19 November 1953, Zeki Müren gave his first concert at the Great Cinema in Atatürk Boulevard

In 1950, while he was a university student, he took part at TRT Istanbul Radio's music competition and ranked number-one out of 186 contestants. On 1 January 1951, he had his first live performance on Istanbul Radio, which was praised by critics. During this performance, he was accompanied by musicians Hakkı Derman, Serif İçli, Şükrü Tunar, Refik Fersan and Necdet Gezen. Hamiyet Yüceses subsequently called the program and congratulated him on his performance. In those years, TRT Ankara Radio was the most listened radio in Anatolia, and Istanbul Radio could not be heard clearly from all parts of Anatolia. At the same week, the clarinetist Şükrü Tunar, took Müren to his own recording studio in Yeşilköy and he recorded his song "Muhabbet Kuşu" on phonograph record. Thanks to this record, Müren became known all over Anatolia.

After the success of his first live performance and his first record, Müren began to perform different songs on Turkish radios. His radio programs went on air for 15 years, most of which included live performances. Müren subsequently focused on giving concerts and recording new songs. He had his first live concert on 26 May 1955. He would usually wear his self-designed clothes on stage. He brought various innovations such as dressing uniforms and using T podium.

Together with Behiye Aksoy, he performed at Maksim Casino for 11 years. In 1976, he became the first Turkish artist to perform at the Royal Albert Hall in London.

Throughout his career, Müren recorded 600 cassettes and phonograph records. His first song recorded on a phonograph was "Bir Muhabbet Kuşu" by Şükrü Tunar. With his song "Manolyam" in 1955, Müren became the first Turkish artist to receive a gold certification. In 1991, he was chosen as a State Artist.

=== Other ventures ===
In 1965, he published a poetry book called Bıldırcın Yağmuru (The Quail Rain), which contains nearly 100 poems. Among the poems featured in this book are Pembe Yağmurlar (Pink Rains), Bursa Sokağı (Bursa Street), İkinci Sadık Dost, Çim Makası, Son Kavga (Last Fight), Bu Bestecikler Sana, Alınyazım, Kazancı Yokuşu and Kendimi Arıyorum. Zeki Müren started acting in the movie Beklenen Şarkı in 1953. After this movie, he acted in 18 more movies. In 1965, he played the leading role in the play Tea and Sempati, staged by Arena Theatre.

== Public image ==
Public reception of Müren's fashion sense, and persona is controversial. In the 1950s, with his special patterns of behavior, dressing and his performance on stage, he managed to keep people constantly interested in himself. In the early years of his career, he chose to wear ordinary clothes and hair styles, but later showed a favor for feminine-styled clothes, and performed with new hair styles and make-up. In 1958 he wore a sequin jacket for the first time in his career. From the 1960s onwards, he began to adopt an androgynous identity through his clothing. In 1970, he put on a costume featuring a miniskirt as a first for him. He is one of the first representatives of cross-dressing in the public sphere in Turkey.

== Personal life ==
Zeki Müren never married. He never commented on his sexual orientation and occasionally his name appeared alongside that of women. The general opinion was that he was gay. He was known to speak Turkish very clearly. Referred to as the "Pasha of Music", in 1969, after his Aspendos concert, for the first time, he started being favored by the people of Antalya. He explained that although he was delighted because of their support, he still did not know why he was that much favored. He served as an assistant officer in Ankara Infantry School (6 months), Istanbul Harbiye Representative Office (6 months) and Çankırı (3 months) in 1957–1958.

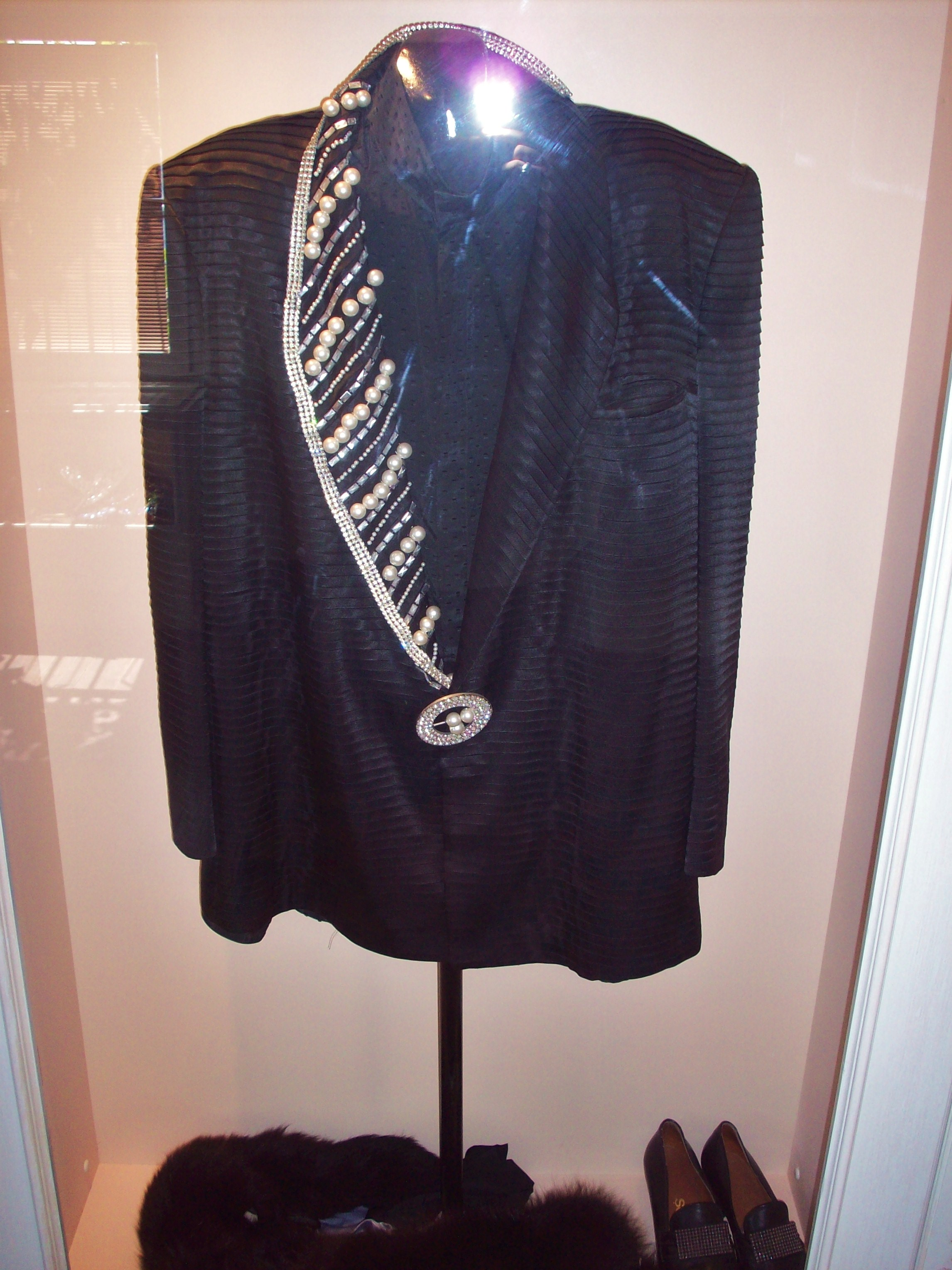
One of the clothes exhibited at Zeki Müren Art Museum in Bodrum

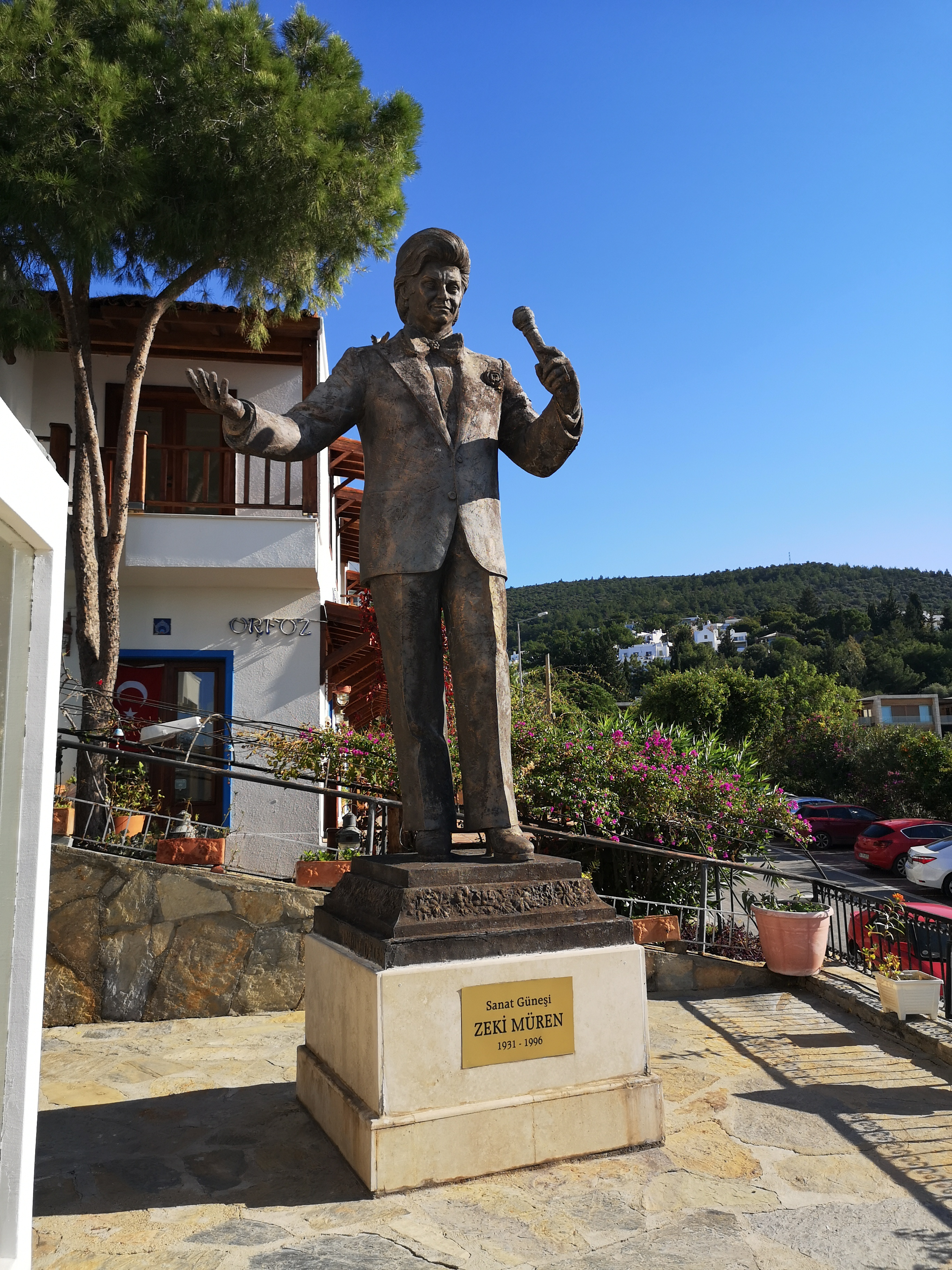
Bronze statue created by Tankut Öktem at Zeki Müren Art Museum

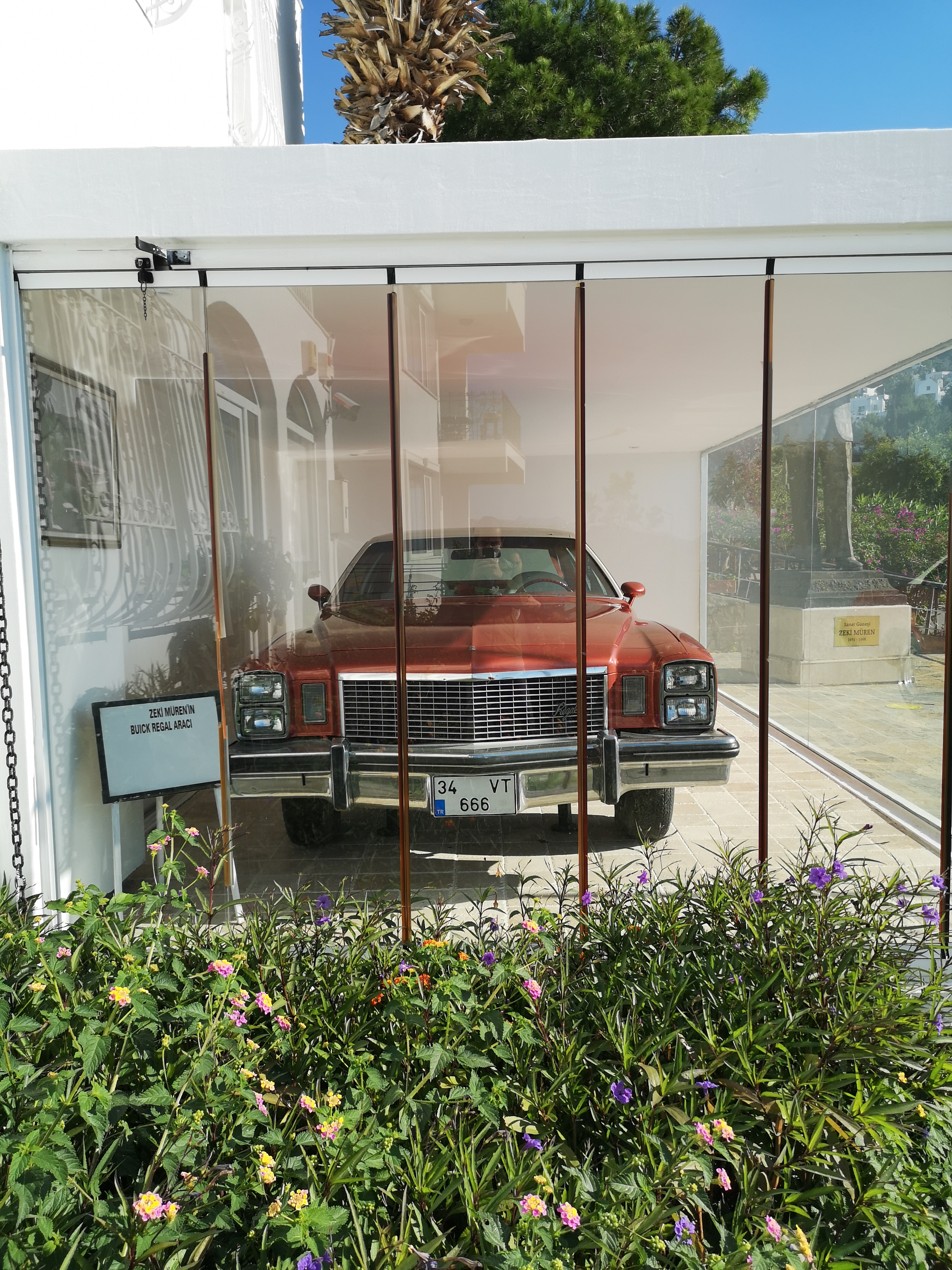
Müren's 1976 Buick Regal sedan, license plate 34 VT 666 at Zeki Müren Art Museum

== Illness and death ==
During the last 6 years of his life, Müren was away from the scenes and the media due to heart disease and diabetes. He was retired at his house in Bodrum. He described this period as a time for "listening to oneself". On 24 September 1996, during the ceremony held for him at TRT İzmir Television in Kültürpark, he had a heart attack and died. His funeral ceremony was attended by a large number of people. His body was taken to his birthplace, Bursa, and buried in Emirsultan Cemetery.

He left all his assets in his will to the Turkish Education Foundation and Mehmetçik Foundation. TEV and Mehmetçik Foundation built Zeki Müren Fine Arts Anatolian High School in Bursa in 2002. In a statement on 24 September 2016, TEV Bursa branch president Mehmet Çalışkan said that the foundation had helped 2,631 students with the Zeki Müren Scholarship Fund over the last 20 years.

After his death, the house in which the artist lived in Bodrum for the last years of his life was transformed into Zeki Müren Art Museum by the order of the Ministry of Culture and was opened to the public on 8 June 2000. It was visited by more than 200 thousand people between its opening on 8 June 2000 and December 2006. In the garden displays, there is a bronze statue of the singer, created by artist Tankut Oktem, and there is Zeki Müren's person car sedan (four doors,) a 1976 Buick Regal in maroon color enclosed in the nearby glass viewing garage.

== Legacy ==
With Onur Akay's suggestion on TRT Music, Müren's date of birth (6 December) has been celebrated as the Turkish Art Music Day since 2012. On 6 December 2018, a Google Doodle was displayed to celebrate his 87th birthday.

== Discography ==
=== Studio albums ===
Albums published during his lifetime

Album list ve sales
Album	Release date	Sales	Record company	Notes
Senede Bir Gün/Yemin Ettim Bir Kere	1966		Grafson Plak	
Zeki Müren	1969		Grafson Plak	
Pırlanta 1	1973		Grafson Plak	
Pırlanta 2	1973		Grafson Plak	
Pırlanta 3	1973		Grafson Plak	
Pırlanta 4	1974		Grafson Plak	
Anılarım	1974		Grafson Plak	
Mapushane/Hayat Kumarı	1974		İstanbul Plak	
Mücevher	1975		Coşkun Plak	
Güneşin Oğlu	1976		Odeon Plak	
Nazar Boncuğu	1977		Elenor Plak	
Sükse	1978		Elenor Plak	
Kahır Mektubu	1980		Türküola	
Sarmaşık Gülleri	1980		Minareci	
Eskimeyen Dost	1982		Türküola	
Unuttumu Dudakların Adımı	1983		Türküola	
Hayat Öpücüğü	1984		Jet Plak	
Aşk Kurbanı	1986		Lider Plak	
Masal	1986		Lider Plak	
Helal Olsun	1987		Lider Plak	
Gözlerin Doğuyor Gecelerime	1988		Yavuz&Burç	
Karanlıklar Güneşi	1988		Lider Plak	
Ayrıldık İşte	1989		Yavuz&Burç	
Zirvedeki Şarkılar	1989		Yavuz&Burç	
Sev Beni	1989		Türküola	
Dilek Çeşmesi	1990		Yavuz&Burç	
Doruktaki Nağmeler	1991		Yavuz&Burç	
Sorma	1992		Yavuz&Burç	

=== Singles ===
Playlist with selected list positions, release year and album name
Single	Year	Format	Notes
Hem Okudum Hem Yazdım	1951		
Asmalar Kol Uzatmış	1951		
Gönlümün Baharı Bir Gün Açacak	1953		
Zehretme Hayatı	1955		
Ruhumda Yine Aşk Bestesi Var	1955		
Hasret Acısı	1957		
Yiğidin Alnına Yazılan Gelir	1957		
Karanlık Geceler Beklerim Yolunu	1957		
Bende Hicran Yarasından	1958		
Gözlerinin İçine Başka Hayal Girmesin	1958		
Züğürt: Nem Alacak Felek Benim	1959		
Zennobe	1960		
Senden Ayrı Günlerimde	1962		
Renk Almış İpek Saçların	1962		
İki Damla Gözyaşı	1970		
Hayat Kumarı / Mahpushane	1973	45s	
Şarkıların Kaderi	1974	45s	
Nasıl İçmem Arkadaşım	1977	45s	
Kandil / Mutluluğun Sırrı	1986	45s	
Madem Derdimi Sordun Dinlemeye Mecbursun	1987		
Aşk Kurbanı	1998	45s	Published posthumously
Yemen Türküsü	2016		Published posthumously
Biz Ayrılamayız	2018		Published posthumously
Günah Defteri / Hasret Ateşi	2018	45s	Published posthumously
Su Akar Şırıl Şırıl	2018		Published posthumously
Sus Kalbim Sus	2018		Published posthumously
Canım Benim Gülüm Benim	2018		Published posthumously
The phrase "45s" indicates that the singles were published as vinyl records.

=== Compilation albums ===
Playlist with selected list positions, release year and album name
Album	Year	Format	Notes
Sorma	1992		
Batmayan Güneş	2006		
Taş Plak Klasikleri	2019		

=== Albums released abroad ===
Playlist with selected list positions, release year and album name
Album	Year	Records	Notes
The Best of Zeki Müren Love Songs Folk Songs Popular Songs of İstanbul	1964	Balkan Records	
The Golden Voice of Zeki Müren	1964	Balkan Records	
Latest Hits of Zeki Müren	1964	Balkan Records	
The Golden Voice Zeki Müren	1964	Balkan Records	
Zeki Müren Altın Sesli The Golden Voice	1964	Balkan Records	

=== Duo albums ===
Playlist with selected list positions, release year and album name
Album	Year	Format	Notes
Biz Ayrılamayız	1998		He sang with Muazzez Abacı.

=== Albums released posthumously ===
- 2000: Muazzez Abacı ve Zeki Müren Düet
- 2002: Zeki Müren: 1955-1963 Kayıtları
- 2005: Selahattin Pınar Şarkıları
- 2005: Sadettin Kaynak Şarkıları
- 2006: Batmayan Güneş
- 2008: Baş Başa Radyo Günleri 1
- 2008: Baş Başa Radyo Günleri 2
- 2008: Baş Başa Radyo Günleri 3
- 2009: Lunapark Konseri
- 2009: Saklı Kayıtlar 1952-1984

In addition to these, there are 12 other albums attributed to Zeki Müren published during 1968–1974 by Grafson Plak.

== Filmography ==
International titles are given in parentheses.

Year	Film	Director	Task					Notes	Source
Year	Film	Director	Actor	Music director	Scriptwriter	Soundtrack	Role	Notes	Source
1953	Beklenen Şarkı (Awaited Song)	Orhon Murat Arıburnu, Sami Ayanoğlu, Cahide Sonku	Yes				Zeki	His only movie with Cahide Sonku.	
1955	Son Beste (The Last Musical Composition)	Arşavir Alyanak	Yes				Zeki Müren		
1957	Berduş (The Vagabond)	Osman F. Seden	Yes			Yes	Bedri		
1958	Altın Kafes (Gilded Cage)	Osman F. Seden	Yes			Yes			
1959	Kırık Plak (The Broken Disk)	Osman F. Seden	Yes		Yes	Yes	Zeki Müren	Work in the Credits: Zeki Müren is mentioned. The screenplay is Bülent Oran.	
1959	Gurbet (Foreign Place)	Osman F. Seden	Yes			Yes			
1962	Hayat Bazen Tatlıdır (Sometimes Life Is Enjoyable)	Nejat Saydam	Yes						
1963	Aşk Hırsızı (Love Thief)	Osman F. Seden	Yes			Yes	Zeki		
1963	Bahçevan (The Gardener)	Nejat Saydam	Yes				Fındık Ali		
1964	İstanbul Kaldırımları (Pavements of Istanbul)	Metin Erksan	Yes			Yes	Zeki		
1965	Hep O Şarkı (Always That Song)	Atıf Yılmaz	Yes			Yes			
1966	Düğün Gecesi (The Wedding Night)	Osman F. Seden	Yes						
1967	Hindistan Cevizi (The Coconut)	Osman F. Seden	Yes				Zeki		
1968	İstanbul'da Cümbüş Var (There is a Revel in Istanbul)	Sırrı Gültekin	Yes				Zeki Müren		
1968	Kâtip (Üsküdara Giderken) (Kâtip)	Ülkü Erakalın	Yes				Katip		
1969	İnleyen Nağmeler (Howling Tunes)	Safa Önal	Yes	Yes			Zeki Müren		
1969	Kalbimin Sahibi (Owner of my Heart)	Safa Önal	Yes						
1970	Aşktan da Üstün (Fallen Out Of Love)	Atıf Yılmaz	Yes			Yes	Zeki		
1971	Rüya Gibi; Like A Dream	Lütfi Akad	Yes				Zeki		
1975	Deli Deli Tepeli (Crazy Crazy Crested)	Nejat Okçugil	Yes				Zeki		

=== Others ===
Clips he has appeared in or songs dedicated to him
Year	Artist	Song	Album	Notes
2002	Aziza Mustafa Zadeh	Ayrılık	Shamans	In an interview she said she is a fan of Zeki Müren.
2006	Nil Karaibrahimgil	Bu mudur?	Tek Taşımı Kendim Aldım	In his video, she included the scenes with Zeki Müren.

== See also ==
- Turkish classical music
- Turkish music
