= In the Name of the Law (1952 film) =

- Directed by: Lütfi Akad
- Written by: Lütfi Akad; Osman F. Seden
- Produced by: Osman F. Seden
- Starring: Ayhan Işık as Nazim; Gülistan Güzey as Ayten; Muzaffer Tema as Halil; Pola Morelli as Perihan; Talat Artemel as Şevket; Nese Yulaç as Nezahat; Settar Körmükçü as Kamil; Nubar Terziyan as Mahmut; Muazzez Arçay as Zehra; Temel Karamahmut as Polis Sefi; Renan Fosforoglu; Sadettin Erbil as Komiser; Riza Tüzün as Doktor; Kerim Pamukoglu; Mümtaz Alpaslan; Kani Kıpçak as Bayram; Reşit Gürzap as Abuzer; Müfit Kiper as Ak Mustafa; Sadri Alışık as Tema Bey; Cahit Irgat as ibrahim; Vedat Örfi Bengü as Kenan; Cahide Sonku as Aysel; Adile Naşit as Adile; Hulusi Kentmen as Reşit Ağa; Fikret Hakan as Hakan
- Cinematography: Enver Burçkin
- Edited by: Turgut Kuzu
- Production company: Kemal Film
- Release date: 27 October 1952
- Running time: 94 minutes
- Country: Turkey
- Language: Turkish

In the Name of the Law (Turkish: Kanun namina) is a 1952 Turkish drama film directed by Lütfi Akad and starring Ayhan Isik, Gülistan Güzey and Muzaffer Tema. The film is based on real events regarding a love triangle that led to homicide, that took place in Istanbul, in the following years of World war II.

== Main cast ==
- Ayhan Işık as Nazim
- Gülistan Güzey as Ayten
- Muzaffer Tema as Halil
- Pola Morelli as Perihan
- Talat Artemel as Şevket
- Nese Yulaç as Nezahat
- Settar Körmükçü as Kamil
- Nubar Terziyan as Mahmut
- Muazzez Arçay as Zehra
- Temel Karamahmut as Polis Sefi
- Renan Fosforoglu
- Sadettin Erbil as Komiser
- Riza Tüzün as Doktor
- Kerim Pamukoglu
- Mümtaz Alpaslan
- Kani Kıpçak as Bayram
- Reşit Gürzap as Abuzer
- Müfit Kiper as Ak Mustafa
- Sadri Alışık as Tema Bey
- Cahit Irgat as ibrahim
- Vedat Örfi Bengü as Kenan
- Cahide Sonku as Aysel
- Adile Naşit as Adile
- Hulusi Kentmen as Reşit Ağa
- Fikret Hakan as Hakan

== Bibliography ==
- Gönül Dönmez-Colin. The Routledge Dictionary of Turkish Cinema. Routledge, 2013.
