= For Chastity =

Namus Uğruna
- Directed by: Osman F. Seden
- Written by: Osman F. Seden
- Cinematography: Kriton Ilyadis
- Release date: 1960
- Country: Turkey
- Language: Turkish

For Chastity, or Namus Uğruna in Turkish, is a 1960 Turkish drama film directed and written by Osman F. Seden.

== Cast ==
- Eşref Kolçak
- Peri Han
- Serpil Gül
- Memduh Ün
- Suphi Kaner
- Diclehan Baban
- Mualla Sürer
- Nuri Ergün
- Eşref Vural
