= Gelenbevi Ismail Efendi =

Professor, mathematician

Ismail (bin Mustafa bin Mahmûd) Gelenbevi (1730 – 1790 or 1791) was an Ottoman Turkish mathematician, Hanafi Maturidi theologian, logician, philosopher and Professor of Geometry at the Naval College in Constantinople, Turkey.

His life and work are well documented in several scholarly works in English and Turkish such as the thesis by Alaettin Avci "Turkiyede Askeri Okullar Tarihcesi" (History of the Military Schools in Turkey), 1963, published by the Research and Development Office of the Turkish General Staff, and Mehmet Karabela's "The development of dialectic and argumentation theory in post-classical Islamic intellectual history",

Born in 1730 in the town of Gelenbe, near Manisa, at that time in the province of Aydin in Western Anatolia, he is known under the name "Gelenbevi" (English: "from Gelenbe"), which means "de Gelenbe" in French, and "von Gelenbe" in German. He studied in Constantinople where he rose through the Ottoman examination system to the rank of "Müderris" or professor, at the age of 33.

At the request of the Sadrazam or Grand Vizier Halil Hamit Pasha ("Paşa" in modern Turkish) (1782–1785), and of the Fleet Admiral Cezayirli Hasan Pasha, he was appointed to a professorship in mathematics at the new Naval College in Kasımpaşa, on the Golden Horn, in Istanbul where he worked with other Ottoman reformers such as the Franco-Hungarian military engineer and aristocrat François Baron de Tott. Gelenbevi received an award from the Emperor Sultan Selim III for his very accurate ballistic computations.

Gelenbevi Ismail published some thirty five scientific treatises, including a monograph on the game of chess written in Turkish and Arabic. He is credited with the introduction of logarithms in Turkey. The late Ottoman era Cabinet Minister Mehmet Cemaleddin Efendi (1848–1917) (Turkish: Mehmet Cemâlüddin Efendi), senior judge of the Ottoman Empire and Şeyhülislam or Cabinet Minister in charge of religious and legal matters, the Ottoman period Minister of Education and Director of the Imperial School of Commerce, Gelenbevizade Mehmet Said (1863–1937), the Turkish cinema pioneer and photographer Baha Gelenbevi (1907–1984), and Professor Erol Gelenbe are direct descendants of Gelenbevi Ismail. A selective public high school in the Fatih district of Istanbul bears the family name.
