= Revenge of the Flame =

1956 film

- Film poster
- Directed by: Osman F. Seden
- Screenplay by: Osman F. Seden
- Produced by: Osman F. Seden
- Starring: Ayhan Işık; Mualla Kaynak; Kenan Pars; Deniz Tanyeli; Turgut Özatay; Nubar Terziyan; Temel Karamahmut
- Cinematography: Kriton Ilyadis
- Production company: Kemal Film
- Release date: 1956
- Country: Turkey
- Language: Turkish

Revenge of the Flame (Turkish: İntikam Alevi) is a 1956 Turkish drama film directed by Osman F. Seden. The stars of the film are Ayhan Işık, Mualla Kaynak, Kenan Pars, Deniz Tanyeli, Turgut Özatay, Nubar Terziyan, and Temel Karamahmut.
