= Kökçü =

Kökçü is a Turkish surname. Notable people with the surname include:

- Orkun Kökçü (born 2000), Turkish football player
- Ozan Kökçü (born 1998), Azerbaijani football player of Turkish descent
- Neriman Köksal (born Hatice Kökçü, 1928 – 1999), Turkish actress
