= Son of a bitch (disambiguation) =

"Son of a bitch" is a profane phrase in English. Son of a bitch, or its plural form sons of bitches, may also refer to:

- Sons of Bitches, a 1990 Soviet comedy film
- Sonofabitch stew, an American stew
- Filho da Puta, a British racehorse with a Portuguese name translating to "Son of a Bitch"

== See also ==
- SOB (disambiguation)
