= Sob =

Sob is a verb meaning cry. Sob and SoB may refer to:

== Biomedicine ==
- Shortness of breath or dyspnea, a medical symptom relating to breathing difficulties
- Sobralia, a genus of orchids
- Super optimal broth, a bacterial growth medium

== Music and media ==
- S.O.B. (film), a 1981 film by Blake Edwards
- The Sob, a 1953 Turkish film
- S.O.B. (band), a Japanese grindcore band
- "S.O.B." (song), by Nathaniel Rateliff and the Night Sweats, 2015
- Scars on Broadway, an American rock band
- Sons of Batman, a group of characters in a Batman comics miniseries
- Sons of Butcher (band), a Canadian rock band
  - Sons of Butcher (TV show), a cartoon inspired by the band
- Sounds of Blackness, an American vocal and instrumental ensemble
- SOB's, Sounds of Brazil, a live music venue in New York City
- Sobs (band), a Singaporean indie rock band
- Styles of Beyond, an underground rap group
- Switched-On Bach, an album by Wendy Carlos
- S.O.B.s, an episode of the television series Arrested Development

== Transport ==
- Seaford–Oyster Bay Expressway
- Balaton Airport, SOB in IATA code
- South Bend station (Amtrak), SOB is its station code
- Southbourne railway station, SOB in Network Rail code
- Stadt-Omnibus Bern, a former public transport operator in Bern, Switzerland
- Südostbahn, a railway company in Switzerland
- SüdostBayernBahn, a railway company in southern Germany
- MS Spirit of Britain, a Dover–Calais P&O Ferry

== Toponyms ==
- Sob (river), a river in Siberia, a tributary of the Ob
- Sob River, a river in Ukraine, a tributary of Southern Bug
- S.O.B. Hill, a mountain in Utah, United States

== Others ==
- Souls on Board (sometimes POB for People on Board), used in Aviation communication
- Seventeen or Bust, a distributed computing project
- Special Operations Battalion (SOB), an elite unit of the Croatian army
- Society of Old Brooklynites, a civic organization
- Son of a bitch, an insult or curse phrase, sometimes abbreviated as "S.O.B."
- Sons of Ben (MLS supporters association)
- Suggested opening bid, a term in auctioneering
- Super Oralloy Bomb, a nuclear bomb
- Senate Office Building
  - Dirksen Senate Office Building
  - Russell Senate Office Building
  - Hart Senate Office Building
- Sulfur-oxidizing bacteria, participating to the sulfur cycle
