= They Paid With Their Blood =

- Film poster
- Directed by: Osman F. Seden
- Screenplay by: Osman F. Seden
- Produced by: Osman F. Seden
- Starring: Eşref Kolçak; Neriman Köksal; Kenan Pars; Talat Artemel; Mualla Kaynak; Kadir Savun; Tamer Balcı
- Cinematography: Kriton Ilyadis
- Production company: Kemal Film
- Release date: 1955
- Country: Turkey
- Language: Turkish

They Paid With Their Blood (Turkish: Kanlarıyla Ödediler) is a 1955 Turkish drama film directed by Osman F. Seden. The stars of the film are Eşref Kolçak, Neriman Köksal, Kenan Pars, Talat Artemel, Mualla Kaynak, Kadir Savun, and Tamer Balcı.
