= In the Name of the Law =

In the Name of the Law may refer to:

- In the Name of the Law (1916), a Thanhouser short film starring Gladys Hulette
- In the Name of the Law (1922 film), a silent American film directed by Emory Johnson
- In the Name of the Law (1932 film), a French film directed by Maurice Tourneur
- In the Name of the Law (1949 film), an Italian film directed by Pietro Germi
- In the Name of the Law (1952 film), a Turkish drama film directed by Lütfi Akad
