= Çılgın Kız ve Üç Süper Adam =

- Directed by: Cavit Yürüklü
- Written by: Volkan Kayhan (writer)
- Produced by: Müfit İlkız (producer)
- Starring: See below
- Cinematography: Orhan Kapkı
- Release date: 1973
- Running time: 65 minutes
- Country: Turkey
- Language: Turkish

Çılgın Kız ve Üç Süper Adam is a 1973 Turkish film directed by Cavit Yürüklü.

The film is also known as 3 Supermen and Mad Girl (American informal English title).

In this adventure the 3 Supermen wind up in Turkey and battle a curvy blonde, her evil boss, (the devil himself) and a robot that carries a deadly ray gun. Stars Levent Çakir, Altan Bozkurt and Yesim Yükselen. (In Turkish language).

== Cast ==
- Levent Çakır
- Altan Bozkurt
- Yeşim Yükselen
- Nubar Terziyan
- Nuri Kırgeç
- Mine Sun
