= Tamer Balcı =

Turkish sportsman and actor (1917–1993)

- Born: Toma Valcis; 1 January 1917; Istanbul, Ottoman Empire
- Died: 10 April 1993 (aged 76); Istanbul, Turkey
- Occupations: Hammer thrower Actor
- Years active: 1951–1976

Tamer Balcı (born Toma Valcis, 1 January 1917 – 10 April 1993), also known as Toma Balcı, was a Turkish sportsman and film actor of Greek descent. Balcı is considered to be the best hammer thrower of the country from 1940 to 1955 as he set the national record 11 times and was a 15-time national champion. He was a non-starter in the 1948 and 1952 Summer Olympics while representing Turkey. He started his acting career in 1951 and appeared in 24 movies, including as Tarzan in Tarzan İstanbul'da (Tarzan in İstanbul) (1952).

== Early life and sports career ==
He was born as Toma Valcis in Istanbul, Turkey, on 1 January 1917. He spent most of his life in Heybeliada and was of Greek descent. He had his early education on the island and started sports at an early age, initially as a footballer and swimmer, and later as a javelin thrower. Following his secondary education, he moved to mainland Istanbul and became a member of the Galatasaray Sports Club. He was conscripted into the Turkish Army for his mandatory draft in 1940. Following his return from the army, he focused on hammer throwing instead.

By this time he was known by his Turkish name Tamer Balcı and was considered to be "the number one" in hammer throwing within Turkey of his time. From 1940 to 1951, he broke the Turkish national record 11 times in total, and won the national championship 15 times: from 1940–1953 and in 1955. While participating the 1950 Turkish Athletic Championships, he threw beyond 50 metres (160 ft) for the first time, setting a result of 50.71 metres (166.4 ft). His final personal best, also the national record at the time, was set in October 1951 and was 52.13 metres (171.0 ft). He represented Turkey in hammer throwing during the 1948 Summer Olympics and 1952 Summer Olympics, though he was a non-starter on both instances.

== Acting career ==
Throughout an acting career which stretched from 1951 to 1976, Balcı appeared in 24 movies. His first acting performance was with 5 Fingers (1952), where he had a minor role. His first title role came with the 1952 movie Tarzan İstanbul'da (Tarzan in Istanbul), directed by Orhan Atadeniz, where Balcı played Tarzan. More than half of the movie was made with scenes taken from Tarzan the Ape Man (1932); the rest of the movie was shot in Istanbul, mostly in the Belgrad Forest. Balcı was cast for the role due to his height and body physique. In the movie, Balcı mimics former Olympic swimmer Johnny Weissmuller, who played Tarzan in the 1932 movie.

He was the stunt performer for Errol Flynn in the 1957 movie Istanbul. Balcı's final appearances were the 1976 movies Sahte Kabadayı and Hınç, starring Kemal Sunal and Cüneyt Arkın respectively. He played the antagonist in both movies.

== Personal life and death ==
Balcı married Maria Balcı, and the couple had a daughter in 1965. Tamer Balcı died on 10 April 1993 and was buried at the Heybeliada Greek Orthodox Cemetery; his gravestone uses his original Greek birth name.

== Filmography ==
Year	Title	Role	Refs.
1951	Ali ile Veli		
1951	Cemile Sultan		
1952	5 Fingers	Minor	
1952	Çakırcalı Mehmet Efe'nin Definesi		
1952	Tarzan in Istanbul	Tarzan	
1953	Köroğlu-Türkan Sultan		
1954	Şarlo İstanbul'da		
1954	Meyhane Köşeleri		
1954	Nasreddin Hoca ve Timurlenk		
1955	They Paid With Their Blood		
1957	Istanbul	Stunt performer	
1961	Sepetçioğlu		
1962	Dağlar Bulutlu Efem		
1964	None But the Lonely Spy		
1969	Beyaz Cehennem		
1970	Şampiyon		
1972	Kader Yolcuları		
1973	Mahpus		
1975	Babacan		
1976	Sahte Kabadayı		
1976	Hınç		
