= Kenan Pars =

Armenian-Turkish actor

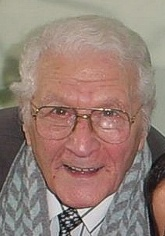
- Born: Kirkor Cezveciyan; 10 March 1920; Istanbul, Ottoman Empire
- Died: 10 March 2008 (aged 88); Istanbul, Turkey
- Occupation: Actor
- Years active: 1940–2005

Kenan Pars (born Kirkor Cezveciyan; 10 March 1920 – 10 March 2008) was a Turkish-Armenian actor. He appeared in more than one hundred films from 1953 to 2000.

== Selected filmography ==
Year	Title	Role	Notes
1953	Murderous City	Kenan	
1955	They Paid With Their Blood		
1956	Revenge of the Flame		
1962	Gençlik Hülyaları		
1964	Karanlıkta Uyananlar		
1965	The Bread Seller Woman		
1988	Mist		
