= İnek Şaban =

- Directed by: Osman F. Seden
- Written by: Osman F. Seden
- Produced by: Kemal Sunal, Fatma Girik
- Starring: Kemal Sunal; Defne Yalnız
- Release date: 1 February 1979
- Running time: 71 minutes
- Country: Turkey
- Language: Turkish

İnek Şaban is a 1979 Turkish comedy film directed by Osman F. Seden. The film was examined in a 2019 Istanbul University master's thesis on football and mass culture in Turkish cinema, which analyzes İnek Şaban in terms of the corruption arising from the relationship between organized crime and football, as well as the representation of masculine conflict within the sport.

== Plot ==
{{One day, Şaban, an apprentice at a greengrocer's, goes to the airport to go to Germany to pay the bride price for the girl he loves . However, Kara Mithat's men, mistaking Şaban for goalkeeper Bülent, drag him away to Mithat. Şaban takes Bülent's place in matches, remembering the watermelons he threw at the greengrocer's, and becomes a giant in goal. Towards the end of the film, Bülent returns and the truth is revealed.}}

== Cast ==
- Kemal Sunal - İnek Şaban / Kaleci Bülent
- Defne Yalnız - Zeliha
- Yavuz Karakaş - Arap Nuri
- Saadet Gürses - Ayşe
- Dinçer Çekmez - Kara Mithat
- Osman F. Seden - Kulüp Başkanı
- Zeki Sezer - Doctor
- Abdi Algül - Kara Mithat's henchman
- Macit Flordun - Coach
- Nermin Özses - Ayşe's mother
- Kudret Karadağ - Mardinli Arif's henchman
- Ali Şen - Bekir Efendi
- Mehmet Uğur - Arap Nuri's henchman
- İbrahim Kurt - Jilet Rıza's henchman
- Baykal Kent - Manda
- İbrahim Uğurlu - Kara Mithat's henchman
- Orhan Elmas - Menajer Kayhan
- Nuri Tuğ - Gardener Recep
- Süheyl Eğriboz - Jilet Rıza
- Cevdet Balıkçı - Arap Nuri's henchman
- Çetin Başaran - Kara Mithat's henchman
