= The Broken Disk =

1959 film

- Film poster
- Directed by: Osman F. Seden
- Written by: Bülent Oran
- Produced by: Osman F. Seden
- Starring: Zeki Müren; Belgin Doruk; Ayfer Feray; Behzat Balkaya; Güney Dinç; Hayri Esen; Muammer Gözalan
- Cinematography: Kriton Ilyadis
- Music by: Zeki Müren
- Production company: Kemal Film
- Release date: 1959
- Country: Turkey
- Language: Turkish

The Broken Disk (Turkish: Kırık Plak) is a 1959 Turkish romantic drama film directed by Osman F. Seden. The stars of the film are Zeki Müren, Belgin Doruk, Ayfer Feray, Behzat Balkaya, Güney Dinç, Hayri Esen, and Muammer Gözalan.
