= Baha Gelenbevi =

Turkish film director (1907–1984)

Baha Gelenbevi (7 January 1907 in Istanbul – 7 August 1984 in Istanbul) was a Turkish filmmaker active in the nascent Turkish film industry in the years 1940 to 1960.

== Family ==
Gelenbevi was born in Istanbul in 1907 in an established old Ottoman family, a grandchild of the Ottoman Government Minister Mehmet Cemaleddin Efendi. He was educated in Istanbul and in France. Baha Gelenbevi's wife, the classical music and opera singer Ren Gelenbevi was originally from France becoming an influential member of the Istanbul musical scene; she taught several prominent Turkish singers and leading figures of Opera in Turkey, during her many years as a professor at the Istanbul City Conservatory, including Leyla Gencer at her beginnings. The Computer Scientist Erol Gelenbe is his second cousin.

== Career ==
As well as being a film director he wrote the script for several of his films, including Günahkârlar Cenneti (1958), Kaldirim Ciçegi (1953), Kanli dösek (1949), Yanik kaval (1947), and Deniz kizi (1944). He devoted the latter part of his life to photography, and his work was presented regularly in art shows in Istanbul and elsewhere.

== Film credits as film director ==
- Günahkârlar Cenneti (1958) or The Sinners' Paradise (International: English title)
- Balikçi güzeli (1953) or The Handsome Fisherman (International: English title)
- Kaldirim çiçegi (1953)
- Bos besik (1952) or The Empty Cradle (International: English title)
- Barbaros Hayreddin Paşa (1951)
- Kanli dösek (1949) or The Bloody Bed (International: English title)
- Çildiran Kadin (1948) or The Woman Who Went Mad (International: English title)
- Yanik kaval (1947)
- Deniz Kizi (1944) or The Mermaid
