= Ottoman Eagle =

- Directed by: Osman F. Seden
- Written by: Osman F. Seden
- Produced by: Osman F. Seden
- Starring: Cüneyt Arkın; Hülya Aşan; Ergün Rona; Kadir Savun
- Release date: 1969
- Country: Turkey
- Language: Turkish

Ottoman Eagle (Turkish: Osmanlı Kartalı) is a Turkish historic action film by Osman F. Seden, released in 1969.

== Plot ==
The film tells the story of the Turkish warlord İslam Bey, portrayed by Cüneyt Arkın. İslam Bey sneaks into a Russian castle where the plans of a Russian attack on Ottoman territory is being planned. He presents himself as a Russian prince to the commander of the castle and tries to slow down the war preparations of the Russian side while the Ottoman forces are awaiting reinforcement.

In one scene İslam Bey orders the Russian commander to wait until the arrival of the "Kiev Imperial Army" to attack the Turks. İslam Bey uses his sword on the portrait of the Tsar and cuts the portrait when he finishes his speech. The portrait he attacked clearly belongs to the last Tsar of the Russian Empire, Nicholas II.

== Cast ==
- Cüneyt Arkın ... İslam / Ahmet
- Hülya Aşan ...
- Kadir Savun ...
- Önder Somer ...
- Atıf Kaptan ...
- Nubar Terziyan ...
- Gülgün Erdem ...
- Oktar Durukan ...

== Production ==
One of the key aspects of the film is that there are almost no outside scenes - nearly all of the story takes place in a European style mansion, representing the Russian castle, and in a dungeon. The film is also different from many other Cüneyt Arkın's historic action films in that it is about a more recent historical era of the Ottoman Empire as opposed to the Battal Gazi, Kara Murat, and Malkoçoğlu movies that have their settings in early Ottoman era, Ghazi tradition and the rise of the Ottoman Empire.

== See also ==
- Cinema of Turkey
