= The Handsome Fisherman =

1953 film by Baha Gelenbevi

- Directed by: Baha Gelenbevi
- Written by: Nazım Hikmet; Ihsan İpekçi
- Produced by: Ihsan İpekçi; Kani İpekçi
- Cinematography: Turgud Ören
- Music by: Mesut Cemil Tel
- Production company: Ipek Film
- Release date: 1953
- Country: Turkey
- Language: Turkish

The Handsome Fisherman (Turkish: Balikçı Güzeli) is a 1953 Turkish adventure film directed by Baha Gelenbevi and starring Cüneyt Gökçer, Ayten Çankaya and Münir Özkul.

== Cast ==
- Cüneyt Gökçer
- Ayten Çankaya
- Münir Özkul
- Nese Yulaç
- Hayri Esen
- Nezihe Becerikli
- Ertuğrul Bilda
- Orhan Boran
- Gülderen Ece
- Muzaffer Nebioğlu
- Feridun Çölgeçen
- Kadri Ögelman

== Bibliography ==
- Giovanni Scognamillo & Metin Demirhan. Fantastik Türk sineması. Kabalcı Yayınevi, 1999.
