= Mehmet Cemaleddin Efendi =

Ottoman judge (1848–1917)

Shaykh al-Islam Mehmet Cemaleddin Efendi
- محمد جمال الدین افندی
- Mehmet Cemaleddin Efendi

Personal life
- Born: 1848 Constantinople, Ottoman Empire
- Died: 4 April 1919 Ramleh, Sultanate of Egypt
- Parents: Kazasker Hâlid Efendi (father); Mevhibe Hanım (mother)
- Notable work(s): Hülasa-i İlm-i Kelam, Siyâsî Hâtıralarım
- Education: Traditional Ottoman and Islamic legal education
- Known for: Serving as Shaykh al-Islam of the Ottoman Empire
- Occupation: Islamic scholar, qadi, jurist and government official

Religious life
- Religion: Islam
- Denomination: Sunni
- Jurisprudence: Hanafi
- Creed: Maturidi

Muslim leader
- Post: Shaykh al-Islam
- Period in office: 1891–1909, 1912–1913

Şeyhülislâm Halidefendizâde Mehmet Cemaleddin Efendi (1848–1917) (Ottoman Turkish: محمد جمال الدین افندی) was an Ottoman judge who served as sheikh al-Islam for Sultan Abdul Hamid II between 1891 and 1909.

== Biography ==
Mehmet Cemaleddin Efendi was born in Kostantiniyye on 13 April 1848. His father, Ahmed Hâlid Efendi, served as qadi of Istanbul, head of the Orphans' Property Administration, chairman of the Meclis-i Tedkikât-ı Şer‘iyye and Meclis-i İntihâb-ı Hükkâm, and kazasker. His paternal grandfather, Yusufzâde Şeyh Yusuf Efendi, was a kazasker during the reign of Mahmud II. His maternal grandfather, Mehmed Said Kevâkibî Efendi, served as qadi of Jerusalem, Egypt, Mecca, Medina and Istanbul and as kazasker of Anatolia and Rumelia. His paternal grandmother was a daughter of the scholar Gelenbevi Ismail Efendi.

He studied with his father and private tutors in Istanbul. He accompanied his father to Kayseri, Sivas and Mecca. He entered the Bâb-ı Fetvâ Mektûbî Kalemi on 13 September 1871. On 13 November 1871 he became deputy secretary of the Meşihat-i İslâmiyye, and on 30 January 1873 secretary to the Anatolian kazasker. He held several positions in the Ministry of Justice's criminal department, including director of its correspondence office and examiner in its Civil Appeals Office.

On 2 June 1878 he received the rank of mahreç, followed by the ranks of bilâd-ı hamse on 12 April 1879 and Haremeyn-i Muhteremeyn on 28 November 1879. He received the rank of qadi of Istanbul on 2 July 1885, that of kazasker of Anatolia on 5 January 1889, and that of kazasker of Rumelia on 7 May 1891. On 18 April 1878 he had become meşihat secretary. While holding that office with the rank of kazasker of Rumelia, he sent private reports to the palace concerning affairs within the Shaykh al-Islamate.

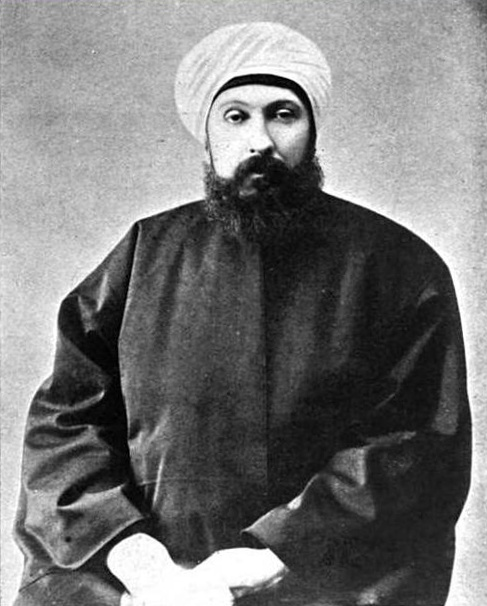
Shaykh ul-Islam Mehmet Cemaleddin Efendi during the reign of Sultan Abdul Hamid II

On 4 September 1891, at the age of 43, Cemaleddin Efendi was appointed Shaykh al-Islam, replacing Ömer Lütfi Efendi. He remained in office until 14 February 1909. During his tenure he opposed foreign borrowing, the issue of shares, the proposed transfer of the operating rights of the Ereğli coal mines to a non-Muslim in return for debt, and parts of the state budget. Abdul Hamid II gave him a furnished yalı at Kuruçeşme.

On 21 July 1905, during the Friday imperial procession, Cemaleddin Efendi spoke with Abdul Hamid II for several minutes. The conversation delayed the sultan's departure, and Abdul Hamid escaped the bomb attack carried out during the procession.

In 1912, during the Balkan Wars, Cemaleddin Efendi's son-in-law Cemil Topuzlu, then mayor of Istanbul, proposed using several mosques to care for soldiers suffering from cholera. The Minister of Religious Foundations opposed the proposal. Cemaleddin Efendi said that he could issue a fatwa permitting mosques to be assigned to wounded and sick soldiers. Several mosques were subsequently assigned to them.

Cemaleddin Efendi resigned as Shaykh al-Islam on 14 February 1909 during a change of cabinet. He was appointed to the office again on 22 July 1912 and served during the governments of Ahmed Muhtar Pasha and Kıbrıslı Kâmil Pasha. His second period ended after the 1913 Ottoman coup d'état.

After the coup, Cemaleddin Efendi was forced to leave for Egypt. He first stayed in Nice, France, with his younger son Ahmed Muhtar Efendi and then moved to Ramleh, Egypt. He did not return to Istanbul.

While in Egypt, he wrote his political memoirs. The memoirs cover the political events of 1909–1913 and were published in Istanbul in 1920. The Turkish Historical Society's library catalogs both the original work, Şeyhülislâm merhum Cemaleddin Efendi hazretlerinin hatırât-ı siyasiyesi, and later editions of Siyasi Hatıralarım.

Cemaleddin Efendi died in Alexandria on 4 April 1919. His funeral prayer was performed there before his body was taken to Istanbul in accordance with his will. His funeral was held in Istanbul on 25 April 1919, and he was buried in the family cemetery at Fatih Otlukçu Yokuşu beside the Şeyh Mahmut Resmî Mosque. After the mosque was destroyed by fire, the graves were transferred to the Edirnekapı Martyr's Cemetery.

== Works ==
- Hülasa-i İlm-i Kelam, Istanbul, 1314.
- Şeyhülislâm merhum Cemaleddin Efendi hazretlerinin Hâtırât-ı Siyâsiyyesi, Istanbul, 1336 [1920].

== Selected bibliography ==
- Cemaleddin Efendi "Siyasi Hatiralarim" from the Ottoman Turkish original, "Hatirat-i Siyasisi", Istanbul 1920, Selim Kutsan (ed.), Publisher, Nehir Yayinlari: 43, Hatiralarla Yakin Tarih Dizisi: 4, Istanbul, 1990.
- Yıldız, E., "XIX. yüzyılda bir Osmanlı şeyhülislâmı: Mehmet Cemalettin Efendi’nin nesebi ve ilmi mirası", Dicle Akademi Dergisi (Journal of the Dicle Academy), 3(2), 147-175, 2023.
