= S.O.B. Hill =

Coordinates: 38°07′14″N 109°51′42″W

S.O.B. Hill is a 5,866-foot (1,788 m), summit in San Juan County, Utah, in the United States.

A trail for off-road vehicles passes over S.O.B. Hill and leads to a small public campground.

S.O.B. Hill has been noted for its unusual place name.
