= Belgin Doruk =

Turkish actress (1936–1995)

- Born: 28 June 1936; Ankara, Turkey
- Died: 26 March 1995 (aged 58); Istanbul, Turkey
- Resting place: Zincirlikuyu Cemetery
- Occupation: Actress
- Spouses: Faruk Kenç (m. 1954; div. 1958) Özdemir Birsel (m. 1961)
- Children: 2

Belgin Doruk (28 June 1936 – 26 March 1995) was a popular Turkish film actress.

== Biography ==
Belgin Doruk was born in Ankara, Turkey, on 28 June 1936. While she continued her education in a high school she took part in a competition and became first along with Ayhan Işık and Mahir Özerdem. Having won the competition she started her film career that would last more than 20 years. She died of heart failure in Istanbul on 26 March 1995.

== Filmography ==
- 1952 - Yavuz Sultan Selim Ağlıyor
- 1952 - Kanlı Çiftlik
- 1952 - Çakırcalı Mehmet Efe'nin Definesi
- 1953 - Köroğlu
- 1953 - Öldüren sehir ~ Selma
- 1955 - Son Beste
- 1955 - Ölüm Korkusu
- 1955 - Kader
- 1957 - Lejyon Dönüşü
- 1957 - Mahşere Kadar
- 1957 - Çölde Bir İstanbul Kızı
- 1957 - Çileli Bülbül
- 1958 - Kederli Yıllar
- 1958 - Daha Çekecek Miyim?
- 1958 - Beraber Ölelim
- 1958 - Hayat Cehennemi
- 1959 - Ölmeyen Aşk
- 1959 - Kırık Plak
- 1959 - Binnaz Binnaz
- 1959 - Annemi Arıyorum
- 1959 - Samanyolu
- 1959 - Ömrümün Tek Gecesi
- 1960 - Kanlı Firar
- 1960 - Yeşil Köşkün Lambası 1960
- 1960 - İlk Aşk 1960
- 1960 - Bir Yaz Yağmuru 1960
- 1960 - Ayşecik Şeytan Çekici 1960
- 1960 - Satın Alınan Adam 1960
- 1960 - Gece Kuşu 1960
- 1960 - Aslan Yavrusu 1960
- 1961 - Zavallı Necdet
- 1961 - Özleyiş
- 1961 - Düğün Alayı
- 1961 - Bülbül Yuvası
- 1961 - Bir Yaz Yağmuru
- 1961 - Bir Demet Yasemen
- 1961 - Aşkın Saati Gelince
- 1961 - Tatlı Günah
- 1961 - Küçük Hanımefendi
- 1961 - Kızıl Vazo
- 1962 - Küçük Hanım Avrupa'da
- 1962 - Gönül Avcısı
- 1962 - Daima Kalbimdesin
- 1962 - Küçük Hanımın Şoförü
- 1962 - Yalnızlar İçin
- 1962 - Aşka Karşı Gelinmez
- 1962 - Küçük Hanımın Kısmeti
- 1962 - Hayat Bazen Tatlıdır
- 1963 - Kadınlar Hep Aynıdır
- 1963 - İlk Göz Ağrısı
- 1963 - Aşk Tomurcukları
- 1963 - Akdeniz Şarkısı
- 1963 - Acı Aşk
- 1963 - Kahpe
- 1963 - Bahçevan
- 1964 - Şoförler Kralı
- 1964 - Bitirimsin Hanım Abla
- 1964 - Duvarların Ötesi
- 1964 - Aşk ve Kin
- 1964 - Suçlular Aramızda
- 1964 - İstanbul Kaldırımları
- 1964 - Evcilik Oyunu
- 1965 - Satılık Kalp
- 1965 - Yasak Cennet
- 1965 - Güzel Bir Gün İçin
- 1965 - Kırık Hayatlar Vadide
- 1965 - Sayılı Dakikalar
- 1965 - Hep O Şarkı
- 1965 - Bir Gönül Oyunu
- 1965 - Şoförün Kızı
- 1965 - Bozuk Düzen
- 1966 - Sevgilim Bir Artistti
- 1966 - Allahaısmarladık Yavrum / Yarın Ağlayacağım
- 1966 - Allahaısmarladık
- 1966 - Toprağın Kanı
- 1967 - Yıkılan Gurur
- 1968 - Atlı Karınca Dönüyor
- 1968 - Kanlı Nigâr Kanlı Nigâr
- 1968 - İstanbul'u Sevmiyorum
- 1969 - Ayşecik Yuvanın Bekçileri
- 1969 - Şahane İntikam
- 1970 - Küçük Hanımın Şoförü
- 1970 - Gönül Meyhanesi
- 1970 - Pamuk Prenses Ve 7 Cüceler Ana Kraliçe
- 1972 - Gecekondu Rüzgârı

Awards
Preceded by Hülya Koçyiğit	Golden Orange Award for Best Actress; 1970 for Yuvanın Bekçileri	Succeeded by Filiz Akın
