= Nubar Terziyan =

Turkish–Armenian actor

- Born: 16 March 1908; Istanbul, Ottoman Empire
- Died: 14 January 1994 (aged 85); Istanbul, Turkey
- Occupations: Actor, Director

Nubar Terziyan (Armenian: Նուպար Թերզեան; born Nubar Alyanak, 16 March 1908 – 14 January 1993) was a Turkish–Armenian actor.

== Biography ==
Of Armenian descent, Nubar Terziyan was born in March 1909 in Istanbul. He went to Bezazyan Ermeni Lisesi (Bezazyan Armenian Lyceum) in Bakırköy. In 1940 he began his acting career and in 1949 had his first major role in an adaptation of Hüseyin Rahmi Gürpınar's Efsuncu Baba. He acted in hundreds of films and several TV shows. He died at the age of 84 on 14 January 1994 and is buried at the Balıklı cemetery in Istanbul.

== Selected filmography ==
1. Efsuncu Baba (1949) .... Agop
2. İstanbul Çiçekleri (1951)
3. İstanbul'un Fethi (1951)
4. Ankara Ekspresi (1952)
5. Iki kafadar deliler pansiyonunda (1952)
6. İngiliz Kemal Lawrense Karşı (1952) .... Villager
7. Kanun namına (1952) .... Kamil
8. Kızıltuğ - Cengiz Han (1952)
9. Salgın (1952)
10. Edi ile Büdü Tiyatrocu (1952)
11. Edi ile Büdü (1953)
12. Soygun (1953)
13. Öldüren sehir (1953) .... Osman
14. Katil (1953) .... Nuri
15. Bulgar Sadik (1954)
16. Son Baskın (1954)
17. Kaçak (1954)
18. Beyaz Cehennem (1954) .... Baskomiser Hamdi
19. Oyuncu kiz (1955)
20. Meçhul kadin (1955)
21. İlk ve Son (1955)
22. Gün dogarken (1955)
23. Dağları Bekleyen Kız (1955)
24. Artık Çok Geç (1955)
25. Disi yila (1956)
26. Zeynebin İntikamı (1956)
27. Piç (1956)
28. Kalbimin sarkisi (1956) .... Doktor
29. İntikam Alevi (1956)
30. Beş Hasta Var (1956)
31. Bir Avuç Toprak (1957)
32. Berdus (1957)
33. Kumpanya (1958)
34. Kederli yillar (1958)
35. Beraber Ölelim (1958)
36. Ömrümün Tek Gecesi (1959)
37. Kırık Plak (1959)
38. Kalpaklılar (1959)
39. Izmir Atesler Içinde (1959)
40. Gurbet (1959)
41. Düşman Yolları Kesti (1959) .... Ethem Bey
42. Cilali Ibo yildizlar arasinda (1959)
43. Talihsiz Yavru (1960)
44. Satın Alınan Adam (1960) .... Selim
45. Yeşil Köşkün Lambası (1960)
46. Rüzgar Zehra (1960)
47. Kırık Kalpler (1960)
48. Kaderime aglarim (1960)
49. Güzeller resmigeçidi (1960)
50. Dolandırıcılar Şahı (1960)
51. Civanmert (1960)
52. Aşktan da Üstün (1960)
53. Aliii (1960)
54. Allah Cezanı Versin Osman Bey (1961)
55. İki Aşk Arasında (1961)
56. Mahalleye Gelen Gelin (1961)
57. Unutamadigim kadin (1961)
58. Sokaktan gelen kadin (1961)
59. Şafakta Buluşalım (1961)
60. Özleyiş (1961)
61. Küçük Hanımefendi (1961)
62. Ekmek Parası (1962)
63. Ayşecik Yavru Melek (1962) .... Seref - Doktor
64. Erkeklik öldü mü Atif Bey (1962)
65. Ver Elini İstanbul (1962)
66. Sokak Kızı (1962)
67. Külhan Aşkı (1962)
68. Küçük Hanımın Şoförü (1962)
69. Küçük Hanım Avrupa'da (1962)
70. Kıyma Bana Güzelim (1962)
71. Hayat Bazen Tatlıdır (1962)
72. Cilalı İbo Rüyalar Aleminde (1962)
73. Bosver doktor (1962)
74. Biz de Arkadaş mıyız? (1962)
75. Zorla evlendik (1963) .... Avukat Ardas
76. Yaralı Aslan (1963)
77. Kin (1963) .... Savci
78. Kendini arayan adam (1963)
79. Kelepçeli Aşk (1963)
80. Kahpe (1963)
81. İki Gemi Yanyana (1963)
82. Hop Dedik (1963)
83. Cinayet gecesi (1963)
84. Cilali Ibo kadin avcisi (1963)
85. Bütün suçumuz sevmek (1963)
86. Bazilari dayak sever (1963)
87. Barut Fıçısı (1963)
88. Badem Şekeri (1963)
89. Arka Sokaklar (1963)
90. Adanalı Tayfur (1963)
91. Hızır Dede (1964) .... Babalik
92. Kral Arkadaşım (1964)
93. Affetmeyen Kadın (1964)
94. Yılların Ardından (1964)
95. Tophaneli Osman (1964)
96. Ölüm Allah'in emri (1964)
97. Macera Kadını (1964)
98. Koçum Benim (1964)
99. Kimse Fatma Gibi Öpemez (1964)
100. Katilin Kızı (1964)
101. Kara dagli efe (1964)
102. Cehennem arkadaslari (1964) .... Murat
103. Abidik Gubidik (1964)
104. Şaka ile Karışık (1965)
105. The Bread Seller Woman (1965)
106. Prangalı Şehzade (1965) .... Udî
107. Seven Kadın Unutmaz (1965)
108. Uzakta Kal Sevgilim (1965)
109. Tatlı Yumruk (1965)
110. Tamirci Parçası (1965)
111. Şeytanın Kurbanları (1965)
112. Sevinç Gözyaşları (1965)
113. Şeker Hafiye (1965)
114. Satılık Kalp (1965)
115. Sana Layık Değilim (1965)
116. Komşunun Tavuğu (1965)
117. Kartallarin öcü: Severek ölenler.. (1965)
118. Fakir Gencin Romanı (1965)
119. Elveda Sevgilim (1965)
120. Bekri Mustafa (1965)
121. Efkârlıyım Abiler (1966)
122. Vur Emri (1966) .... Prison officer
123. Geceler Yarim Oldu (1966)
124. Babam Katil Değildi (1966)
125. Suçsuz Firari (1966)
126. Siyah Gül (1966)
127. Seher Vakti (1966)
128. Meleklerin İntikamı (1966)
129. Kenarın Dilberi (1966)
130. Kara Tren (1966)
131. İdam Mahkumu (1966)
132. Fakir çocuklar (1966)
133. Düğün Gecesi (1966)
134. Beyoğlu Esrarı (1966)
135. Ayrılık Şarkısı (1966)
136. Avare Kız (1966)
137. Akşam Güneşi (1966) .... Halil
138. Affet Sevgilim (1966)
139. Aci tesadüf (1966)
140. Deli Fişek (1967)
141. Zehirli Çiçek (1967)
142. Yarın Çok Geç Olacak (1967)
143. Silahli pasazade (1967)
144. Serseriler krali (1967)
145. Sefiller (1967)
146. Ölümsüz Kadın (1967)
147. Kelepçeli Melek (1967)
148. Kardeş Kavgası (1967)
149. Kara Duvaklı Gelin (1967)
150. Ilk askim (1967)
151. Hırçın Kadın (1967)
152. Çifte Tabancalı Damat (1967)
153. Cici Gelin (1967)
154. Bekâr Odası (1967)
155. Ayrılık Saati (1967)
156. Aşkım Günahımdır (1967)
157. Aksamci (1967)
158. Aga düsen kadin (1967)
159. Aşka Tövbe (1968) (1968)
160. Cilali Ibo Istanbul Kaldirimlarinda (1968)
161. Yayla kartali (1968)
162. Urfa-Istanbul (1968) .... Cebbar
163. Tahran Macerası (1968)
164. Sevemez Kimse Seni (1968)
165. Sabah Yıldızı (1968)
166. Paydos (1968)
167. Kâtip (1968)
168. İngiliz Kemal'in Oğlu (1968)
169. Gül ve Şeker (1968)
170. Funda (1968)
171. Dertli Pınar (1968)
172. Benim de Kalbim Var (1968)
173. Ana Hakkı Ödenmez (1968)
174. Son Mektup (1969)
175. Dağlar Kızı Reyhan (1969) .... Mahkum
176. Osmanlı Kartalı (1969) .... İmamoğlu's father
177. Ömercik babasinin oglu (1969)
178. Kapıcının Kızı (1969)
179. İki yetime (1969)
180. Hüzünlü ask (1969)
181. Hayat Kavgası (1969)
182. Hanci (1969) .... Polis
183. Galatalı Fatma (1969)
184. Çingene Aşkı Paprika (1969)
185. Boş Çerçeve (1969) .... Avni
186. Besikteki miras (1969)
187. Batakli damin kizi Aysel (1969)
188. Ağlama Değmez Hayat (1969)
189. Aysel Bataklı Damın Kızı (1969)
190. Zeyno (1970)
191. Yuvasiz kuslar (1970)
192. Yumurcak köprüalti çocugu (1970)
193. Yılan Kadın (1970)
194. Tatli melegim (1970)
195. Tatlı Hayal (1970)
196. Son Kızgın Adam (1970)
197. Son Günah (1970) .... Fahri, police chief
198. Seven Ne Yapmaz (1970)
199. Paralı Askerler (1970)
200. Öleceksek ölelim (1970)
201. Küçük Hanımefendi (1970) .... Feridun
202. İşler Karışık (1970)
203. Erkeklik Öldü mü Abiler (1970)
204. Cilalı İbo Avrupa'da (1970)
205. Bütün Aşklar Tatlı Başlar (1970)
206. Birleşen Yollar (1970)
207. Ah Müjgan Ah (1970)
208. Ağlayan Melek (1970)
209. Cambazhane Gülü (1971)
210. Ayibettin Semsettin (1971)
211. Yumurcağın Tatlı Rüyaları (1971)
212. Mistik (1971)
213. Bir genç kizin romani (1971)
214. Küçük sevgilim (1971)
215. Üvey ana (1971)
216. Unutulan Kadın (1971)
217. Solan Bir Yaprak Gibi (1971)
218. Sezercik yavrum benim (1971)
219. Sevimli haydut (1971)
220. Sevdiğim Uşak (1971)
221. Satın Alınan Koca (1971) .... Hizir Baba
222. Saraylar Meleği (1971)
223. Ölmeyen Adam (1971)
224. Kaçak (1971)
225. Ibis: Newyork canavari (1971)
226. Fatoş Sokakların Meleği (1971)
227. Disi hedef (1971)
228. Cilali Ibo yetimler melegi (1971)
229. Cehenneme bir yolcu (1971)
230. Bir kadin kayboldu (1971)
231. Bir avuç kan (1971)
232. Bebek Gibi Maşallah (1971)
233. Ateş Parçası (1971)
234. Melek mi, Şeytan mı? (1971) .... Abdullah
235. Adini anmayacagim (1971)
236. Cilalı İbo Teksas Fatihi (1972)
237. Bir Pınar Ki (1972)
238. Oyun Bitti (1972)
239. Acı Kader (1972)
240. Yirmi yil sonra (1972)
241. Bin Bir Gece Masallari (1972)
242. Ask ve cinayet melegi (1972)
243. Paprika gaddarin aski (1972) .... Mestan
244. Sezercik aslan parcasi (1972)
245. Fatma Bacı (1972)
246. Ölümle Dudak Dudaga (1972)
247. Vurma Zalim Vurma (1972)
248. Tövbekâr (1972)
249. Son duani et (1972)
250. Mahkum (1972)
251. Kopuk (1972)
252. Kallesler (1972) .... Melek'in Babasi
253. Kahpe tuzagi (1972) .... Sevket
254. Kaderin esiriyiz (1972)
255. Falci (1972)
256. Evlat (1972)
257. Çile (1972)
258. Atmaca Mehmet (1972)
259. Aslanlarin ölümü (1972)
260. Kirik hayat (1973) .... Temel Reis
261. Ekmekçi Kadin (1973)
262. Kabadayinin sonu (1973) .... Arzu'nun Babasi
263. Afacan Harika Çocuk (1973)
264. Iki süngü arasinda (1973)
265. Bataklik bülbülü (1973) .... Komiser
266. Bir Garip Yolcu (1973) .... Judge
267. Tatlım (1973) .... Kaptan
268. Bir Demet Menekşe (1973) .... Yakup the jeweller
269. Aşk Mahkumu (1973)
270. 7 evlât iki damat (1973) .... Mahmut
271. Kara Sevda (1973)
272. Karateci Kiz (1973) .... Zeynep's Father
273. Yalanci Yarim (1973) .... Bahçivan Mestan
274. Süphe (1973)
275. Soyguncular (1973)
276. Ölüm satanlar (1973) .... Murat'in Dayisi
277. Öksüzler (1973) .... Rasim the milkman
278. İkibin Yılın Sevgilisi (1973)
279. Güllü Geliyor Güllü (1973) .... Temel Reis
280. Çilgin kiz ve üç süper adam (1973)
281. Çaresizler (1973)
282. Askimla oynama (1973)
283. Arap Abdo (1973)
284. Anneler Günü (1973)
285. Anadolu ekspresi (1973) .... Osman Reis
286. Askin Zaferi (1974)
287. Kalles (1974)
288. Çoban (1974)
289. Kardesim (1974) .... Arif Baba
290. Siginti (1974)
291. Talihsizler (1974)
292. Talihsiz yavrum (1974) .... Doktor Amca
293. Erkeksen kaçma (1974) .... Hüseyin
294. Düsmanlarim çatlasin (1974) .... Hakim
295. Sahipsizler (1974)
296. Yaz Bekarı (1974)
297. Silemezler Gönlümden (1974)
298. Sevmek (1974) .... Nikah Memuru
299. Sensiz yasanmaz (1974) .... Udi
300. Memleketim (1974) .... Ismail Efendi
301. Kısmet (1974)
302. Dayi (1974)
303. Dayan oglum dayan (1974) .... Hülya'nin Babasi
304. Ayrı Dünyalar (1974)
305. Murder on the Orient Express (1974)
306. Tasrali Kiz (1975)
307. Mirasyediler (1975)
308. Yasar ne yasar ne yasamaz (1975) .... Topkapi Sarayi Müdürü
309. Bir ana bir kiz (1975)
310. Delisin (1975)
311. Oy Emine (1975)
312. Saymadim Kaç Yil Oldu (1975)
313. Eski Kurtlar (1975)
314. Ah bu kadinlar (1975)
315. Vur Davula Tokmagi (1975)
316. Üç ahbap çavuslar (1975) .... Sakir
317. Tatli sert (1975) .... Polis Sefi
318. Sinifta senlik (1975) .... Ögretmen
319. Onun hikayesi (1975)
320. Nöri Gantar Ailesi (1975)
321. Nereden çikti bu velet (1975)
322. Kader yolculari (1975) .... Kadri Baba
323. Gece Kusu Zehra (1975) .... Dösemeci
324. Fistiklar (1975) .... Varyemez Hüsamettin
325. Duyun beni (1975)
326. Bunalim (1975)
327. Bahti Karali Yarim (1975) .... Asçi Ali
328. Ah Nerede (1975) .... Dünür
329. Ah Bu Gençlik (1975) .... Salih Dayı
330. Sevdalilar (1976)
331. Perisan (1976)
332. Sıralardaki Heyecan (1976)
333. Kader baglayinca (1976) .... Faytoncu
334. Gülsah küçük anne (1976) .... Esnaf
335. Bodrum Hakimi (1976) .... Tevfik Efendi
336. Ben sana mecburum (1976)
337. Alev (1976) .... Doktor
338. Ah bu gençlik (1976)
339. Adana urfa bankasi (1976)
340. Bizim Kız (1977)
341. Tövbekar (1977)
342. Yuvanin bekçileri (1977) .... Basri Baba
343. Onu Kötü Vurdular (1977)
344. Dila Hanım (1977).... Osman Emmi the miller
345. Aslan Bacanak (1977) .... Doctor
346. Sen Ask Nedir Bilir misin (1978)
347. Vahşi Gelin (1978) .... Necmiye's father
348. Kara Murat Devler Savaşıyor (1978)
349. Kadinlar kogusu (1978)
350. İyi Aile Çocuğu (1978) .... Kemal'in Babasi
351. Çilekeş (1978)
352. Dertli Pinar (1979)
353. Ne Olacak Şimdi (1979) .... Judge
354. Mukaddes vazife (1979)
355. Insan sevince (1979)
356. Canikom (1979)
357. Beddua (1980) .... Müzik Hocasi
358. Zübük (1980)
359. Havar (1980)
360. Durdurun dünyayi (1980)
361. Topragin teri (1981)
362. Saka yapma (1981) .... Metin'in Babasi
363. Kördüğüm (1982)
364. Yakilacak kadin (1982)
365. Islak mendil (1982)
366. Çayda çira (1982)
367. Aşkların En Güzeli (1982)
368. Zifaf (1983) .... Kenan'in Babasi Tahir
369. Yildizlarda kayar (1983) .... Asim Baba
370. Küçük Ağa (1983, TV Mini-Series) .... Dr. Minas
371. Kalbimdeki aci (1983) .... Nuri Baba
372. Beyaz Ölüm (1983) .... Ihsan Dayi
373. Postaci (1984)
374. Nefret (1984)
375. Lodos Zühtü (1984) .... Zühtü'nün Babasi
376. Dağınık Yatak (1984)
377. Birkaç Güzel Gün İçin (1984)
378. Yavru Kus (1985)
379. Keriz (1985)
380. Kanun adami (1985) .... Sevket Baba
381. Ikizler (1985)
382. Güldür yüzümü (1985) .... Tahir Baba
383. Gözlerden Kalbe (1985)
384. Sevda rüzgari (1986) .... Hikmet Ziya
385. Kader rüzgari (1986) .... Sirri Baba
386. Hapishane gülü (1986)
387. Dökülen Yapraklar (1987)
388. Gönülden Gönüle (1988)
389. Biz Ayrılamayız (1988)
390. Çingene (1989) .... (final film orle)
391. Aşk Filmlerinin Unutulmaz Yönetmeni (1990) .... Himself

== Popular culture ==
Nubar Terziyan was mentioned in a song by famed Turkish singer Sezen Aksu called "Kırık Vals" (Broken Waltz) in her Deniz Yıldızı (Starfish) album.
