= Neriman Köksal =

Turkish actress (1928–1999)

- Born: Hatice Kökçü; 17 March 1928; Eyüp, Istanbul, Turkey
- Died: 23 October 1999 (aged 71); Şişli, Istanbul, Turkey
- Resting place: Zincirlikuyu Cemetery
- Occupation: Actress
- Years active: 1950–1999

Neriman Köksal (born Hatice Kökçü; 17 March 1928 – 23 October 1999) was a Turkish actress. She appeared in more than one hundred films from 1950 to 1996.

== Selected filmography ==
Year	Title	Role	Notes
1953	The Killer		
1954	The White Hell		
1955	They Paid With Their Blood		
1983	Şekerpare		
