= Muzaffer Tema =

- Born: June 15, 1919; Istanbul, Ottoman Empire
- Died: October 4, 2011 (aged 92); Çeşme, Turkey
- Education: Istanbul Municipality Conservatory
- Occupation: Actor
- Years active: 1935-2010
- Spouse(s): Sevinç Tevs (m. 1941–1956); İnci Tema

Muzaffer Tema (June 15, 1919 – October 4, 2011) was a Turkish movie actor.

== Biography ==
He was born on June 15, 1919, in Istanbul. Following his education in flute, violin and piano playing at the Istanbul Municipality Conservatory, he served as a musician at the Ankara State Conservatory and the Presidency Philharmonic Orchestra.

In 1949, Muzaffer debuted in acting in the movie Çığlık. He became popular in the Turkish cinema during the 1950s. To try his luck in Hollywood, he divorced and went in 1956 to the USA, where he played in two movies, A Certain Smile (1958) (Acı Tebessüm) and Twelve to the Moon (1960) (Aya Giden 12 Adam). He was also married to Zisan Tema and became so the first ever Turkish actor to play in a Hollywood movie. After two and half years, he returned home due to his father's illness.

He died in the morning of October 4, 2011, at the age of 92 in Çeşme, İzmir Province, where he lived since 1999 with his wife İnci.

== Selected filmography ==
- Aysel Bataklı Damın Kızı (1935)
- Size Nasıl Geliyorsa (1936)
- Güneşe Doğru (1937)
- Aynaroz Kadısı (1938)
- Taş Parçası (1939)
- Yılmaz Ali (1940)
- Kahveci Güzeli (1941)
- Sürtük (1942)
- On Üç Kahraman (1943)
- Hasret (1944)
- Köroğlu (1945)
- Senede Bir Gün (1946)
- Yara (1947)
- Damga (1948)
- Üvey Baba (1949)
- Uçuruma Doğru (1949)
- Fato - ( Ya İstiklal Ya Ölüm ) (1949)
- Çığlık (1949)
- Parmaksız Salih (1950)
- Seni Unutmadım (1951)
- İstanbul Kan Ağlarken (1951)
- Dudaktan Kalbe (1951) - Kenan
- Günahını Ödeyen Adam (1952)
- Memiş ile İbiş Anaforcular Kralı (1952)
- İngiliz Kemal Lawrence'e Karşı (1952) - Maj. Lawrence
- Kanun Namına (1952) - Halil
- Onu Ben Öldürdüm (1953) - Besteci Orhan
- İstanbul Canavarı (1953)
- Hıçkırık (1953)
- Aşk Izdırabtır (1953)
- Son Baskın (1954)
- Öldüren Sır (1954)
- Ölüm Korkusu (1955)
- Kızımla Beraber Ağladık (1955) - MühendisCelal
- Kadın Severse (1955)
- Aşk ve Ölüm (1955)
- Dişi Yılan (1956)
- Beş Hasta Var (1956)
- Bir Avuç Toprak (1957)
- A Certain Smile (1958) - Pierre
- Gönül Kimi Severse (1959)
- Aşk Rüyası (1959)
- 12 to the Moon (1960) - Dr. Selim Hamid
- Kırık Kalpler (1960)
- Yumurcak (1961)
- Özleyiş (1961)
- Vahşi Kedi (1961)
- Mağrur Kadın (1962)
- Gönül Ferman Dinlemez (1962)
- Barut Fıçısı (1963)
- Aşka Tövbe (1964)
- Sekiz Kuruş (1964)
- Kader Kapıyı Çaldı (1964)
- Baba Hasreti (1964)
- Ankara'ya Üç Bilet (1964)
- Altın Kelepçe (1964)
- Çanakkale Aslanları (1965)
- Seven Kadın Unutmaz (1965)
- Dudaktan Kalbe (1965)
- Şehvetin Esiriyiz (1965)
- Posta Güvercini (1965)
- Onyedinci Yolcu (1965)
- On Korkusuz Kadın (1965)
- Oğlum Oğlum (1965)
- Melek Yüzlü Caniler (1965)
- Korkunç İntikam (1965)
- Kırbaç Yarası (1965)
- Severek Ölenler (1965)
- Hırsız (1965) - Ilhan
- Güneşe Giden Yol (1965) - Rauf
- Fakir Gencin Romanı (1965)
- Canım Sana Feda (1965) - Cevdet Tekin
- Hayatımın Kadını (1965)
- Dağ Çiçeği (1965)
- O Kadın (1966)
- Milyonerin Kızı (1966)
- Meleklerin İntikamı (1966)
- Kumsalda Üç Kadın (1966)
- Korkunç Arzu (1966)
- Kadın Avcılar (1966)
- Kaderin Cilvesi (1966) - Ekrem
- Içimdeki Alev (1966)
- Allahaismarladik yavrum (1966)
- Allahaısmarladık (1966)
- Yarın Ağlayacağım (1966)
- Allaha Ismarladık (1966)
- Evlat Uğruna (1967) - Dogan
- Killing İstanbul'da (1967) - Prof. Cemil
- Tapılacak Kadın (1967)
- Korkunç Yumruk (1967)
- Killing Uçan Adam'a Karşı (1967) - Profesör Cemil
- Kelepçeli Melek (1967)
- Kara Duvaklı Gelin (1967)
- Ringo Kid (1967)
- Kader Bağı (1967) - Kibar Jack
- Hacı Murat (1967) - Prince Boronsev
- Düşman Aşıklar (1967)
- Dokuzuncu Hariciye Koğuşu (1967) - Doktor ragip
- Alpaslan'ın Fedaisi Alpago (1967) - Korcan
- Ağlayan Kadın (1967)
- Kahveci Güzeli (1968) - Selim
- İstanbul Kaldırımları (1968)
- Yakılacak Kitap (1968)
- Urfa-Istanbul (1968)
- Son Hatıra (1968)
- Mafia Ölüm Saçıyor (1968)
- Kezban (1968)
- Karanlık Yollar (1968)
- İngiliz Kemalin Oğlu (1968)
- İngiliz Kemal (1968)
- İftira (1968)
- Hicran Gecesi (1968) - Resit
- Dünyanın En Güzel Kadını (1968)
- Bozkırlar Şahini (1968)
- Altın Avcıları (1968)
- Acı İnanç (1968)
- Uykusuz Geceler (1969)
- Ümit dünyasi (1969)
- Sevdiğim Adam (1969)
- Seninle Düştüm Dile (1969)
- Sabırtaşı (1969)
- Kirli Yüzlü Melek (1969)
- Izdırap Şarkısı (1969)
- Damga (1969)
- Buruk Acı (1969) - Haldun
- Bir Aşk Türküsü (1969)
- Ayrı Dünyalar (1969)
- Ana Yüreği (1969)
- Ana Mezarı (1969)
- Maskeli Şeytan (1970) - Arkeoloji Prof.
- Yaban Gülü (1970)
- Şeytan Kayaları (1970) - Yüzbasi
- Kara Dutum (1970)
- Dört Kabadayı (1970)
- Aşk Hırsızı (1970)
- Sevmek Ve Ölmek Zamanı (1971) - Harun Harunoglu
- Kara Korsanın Hazineleri (1971)
- Zagor Kara Bela (1971)
- Vurguncular (1971)
- Solan Bir Yaprak Gibi'Q (1971)
- Sevenler Kavuşurmuş (1971)
- Mavi Boncuk Lassi (1971)
- Gençliğin Rüyası (1971)
- Asrın Kadını (1971)
- Afacan Küçük Serseri (1971)
- Mahşere Kadar (1972) - Muzaffer
- Aşk Fırtınası (1972) - Muammer
- Yılmayan Şeytan (1972) - Yilmaz
- Tövbekar (1972)
- İlk Aşk (1972) - Ali's Father
- Aslanlarin ölümü (1972)
- Kırık Merdiven (1972)
- Sevgili Hocam (1973)
- Yaban (1973)
- Balıkçı Osman (1973)
- Çocuğumu İstiyorum (1973)
- Askimla oynama (1973)
- Avanta Yok (1974)
- Macera Yolu (1974)
- Domatesler Ve Silahlar (1974)
- Who Breaks... Pays (1975)
- Bir Araya Gelemeyiz (1975) - Bülent
- Vazife Uğruna (1986)
- Silaha Yeminliydim (1987)
- Islak Sokak (1987)
