= Ayhan Işık =

Turkish actor

- Born: Ayhan Işıyan; 5 May 1929; İzmir, Turkey
- Died: 16 June 1979 (aged 50); Istanbul, Turkey
- Occupation: Actor
- Years active: 1951–1979
- Spouse: Gülşen Işık (m. 1963)
- Children: 1

Ayhan Işık (born Ayhan Işıyan; 5 May 1929 – 16 June 1979) was one of the pioneers of Turkish cinema and actors in Turkey, and among the most famous Turkish leading actors in the 1950s and 1960s.

== Biography ==
Ayhan Işık was born Ayhan Işıyan on 5 May 1929 in the Konak district of İzmir. He was the youngest of six children. He lost his father when he was just six years old. In his posthumously published memoirs, Işık described his father as follows: "The most significant thing I remember about him is the way he smelled. I loved his hugging me before I went to bed. Once he took me fishing and carried me on his back on our way home since I was exhausted. That is all I can remember about him. I have always tried to force myself to remember more of him; unfortunately I couldn't."

He attended school in İzmir and Istanbul, where they moved after Işık's elder brother attended university. He liked going to school. He once noted that his teachers in high school included such significant writers of Turkish literature as Mahir İz, Salah Birsel and Rıfat Ilgaz. He was a sociable boy and made many friends in Istanbul. Some of his friends from school became important individuals as well.

After high school, Ayhan Işık and his cinema partner Sadri Alışık attended the painting department of the State Fine Arts Academy. He was a good painter and he joined a group of young painters who called themselves "The Ten," since they were then fellow painters. Their goal was to create a synthesis of Eastern and Western values in the medium of painting while one of their secondary intentions was to make close contact with the art of the common man, a goal he would achieve later as an actor.

Işık took first place in the contest, and his film career began. He first played the leading role in a historical film called "Yavuz Sultan Selim ve Yeniçeri Hasan" (Selim I and Janissary Hasan) directed by Orhan Murat Arıburnu. After that, Işık met Ömer Lütfi Akad and the two made a film series called "İngiliz Kemal" (English Kemal), which was an action thriller.

In 1952, Akad directed a very significant film called "Kanun Namına" (In the Name of the Law), in which Işık played the leading role mutually with Gülistan Güzey, the femme fatale of Turkish cinema in the 1950s. The film was an extraordinary drama about ordinary people, which brought the film great success. People loved the film, but they loved the young leading actor, Ayhan Işık, more.

Film after film, year after year, Işık's fame grew. People wanted to see him. Osman Seden, his producer at that time, says that Işık began working in the films produced by Seden for TL 1,000 in the early 1950s, while he would be paid TL 100,000 in the early 1960s.

However, Ayhan Işık was not satisfied with his lot and visited many countries including Italy and Iran in order to find new possibilities and contacts to market Turkish films. Though paid at the highest level in Turkey, Işık's average fee for a hit film was less than one-10th of the fee paid to a leading actor in the U.S.

The film Bitter Life, directed by Metin Erksan, was a second triumph for Işık. This was again a dramatic and bloody love story, which would become a trademark for Işık's movies.

Star-cinema loves actor-actress pairings. Though Işık worked with many popular actresses of his time, his films with Belgin Doruk are among the most highly regarded in his career, with their chemistry most notable to the audience. The "Küçükhanım" (Mademoiselle) film series was the outcome of this pairing and all were box-office hits. The pair made 11 films in a row.

Akad and some film critics said that Işık's best role was in the "Küçükhanım" series, which were romantic comedy films.

Işık's films with Türkan Şoray provided a different kind of pairing. The two worked together in "Acı Hayat," 1962 and "Otobüs Yolcuları" (Bus Passengers), 1961. Neither had a happy ending and both were realistic. "Otobüs Yolcuları" was a political thriller while "Bitter Life" was a social drama.

== Death ==
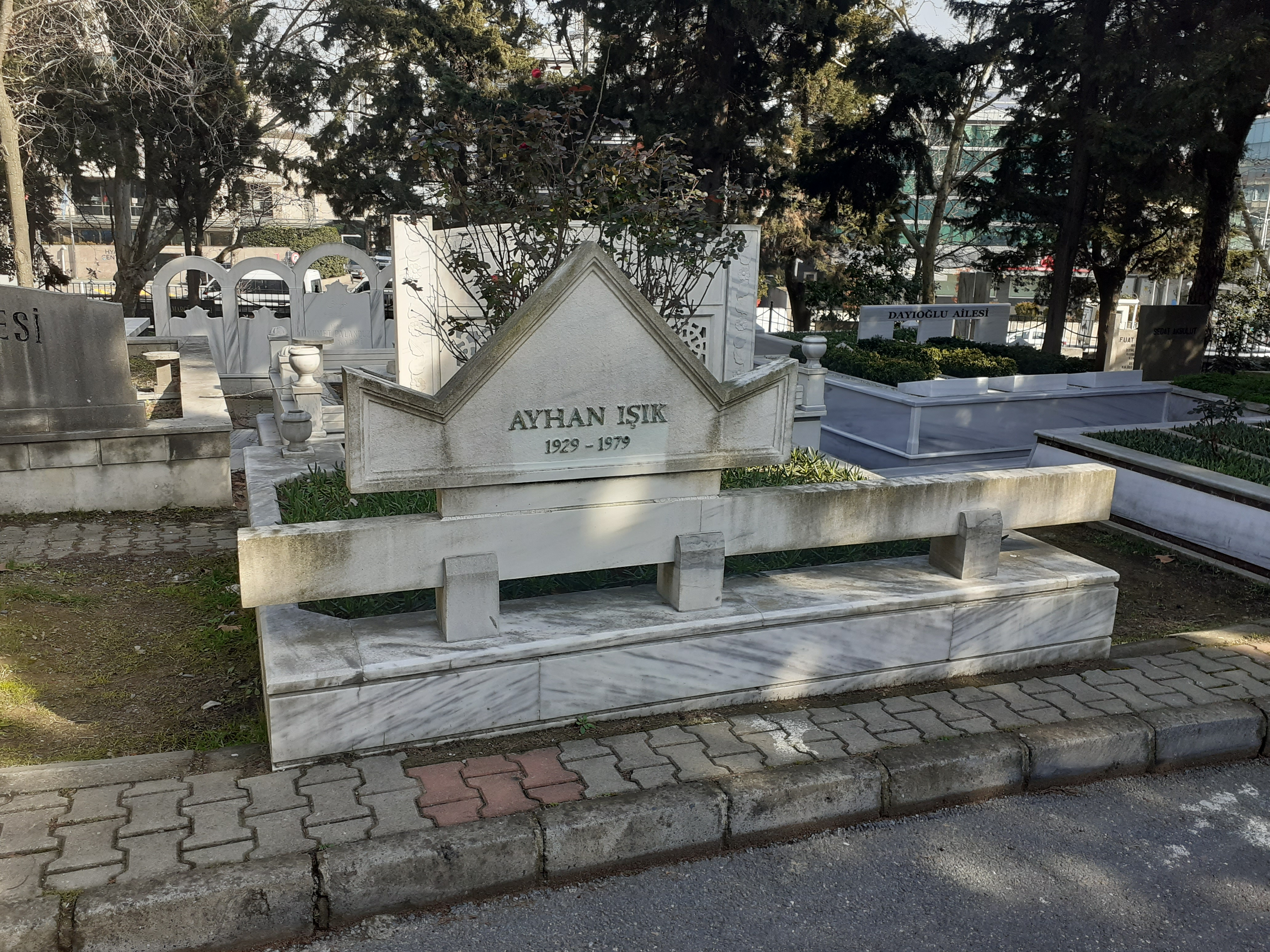
Ayhan Işık's grave

Işık died in 1979 at the age of 50 from cerebral hemorrhage that comes from sunstroke during a sunbath on the terrace of his house, which shocked his family, friends and fans. He was known for his disciplined and calm living free from any scandals. He lived a kingly life as much as the social and economic conditions of the filmmaking business allowed him to, and died as "The Crownless King" (TR: Tacsiz Kral) as the press used to call him.

== Filmography ==
- 1951 - Yavuz Sultan Selim ve Yeniçeri Hasan
- 1952 - İngiliz Kemal Lawrence`e Karşı ~ Ahmet Esat/İngiliz Kemal
- 1952 - Kanun Namına ~ Nazım Usta
- 1953 - Kanlı Para
- 1953 - Katil ~ Kemal
- 1953 - Vahşi Arzu
- 1953 - Öldüren sehir ~ Ali
- 1954 - Vahşi Bir Kız Sevdim ~ Yüzbaşı Adil
- 1954 - Şimal Yıldızı
- 1955 - Kardeş Kurşunu ~ Orhan
- 1956 - İntikam Alevi
- 1957 - Bir Avuç Toprak
- 1958 - Beraber Ölelim
- 1958 - Meçhul Kahramanlar ~ Osman
- 1960 - Ölüm Peşimizde
- 1960 - Devlerin Öfkesi
- 1960 - Kanlı Firar
- 1960 - Yangın Var (Eski İstanbul Kabadayıları) ~ Murat
- 1961 - Otobüs Yolcuları ~ Otobüs Şoförü Kemal
- 1961 - Avare Mustafa
- 1961 - Ya O Ya Ben
- 1961 - Küçük Hanımefendi
- 1961 - Tatlı Günah
- 1961 - Aşktan da Üstün
- 1961 - Sevimli Haydut
- 1962 - Üç Tekerlekli Bisiklet ~ Ali
- 1962 - Küçük Hanım Avrupa`da ~ Ömer
- 1962 - Zorlu Damat ~ Necdet/Hasan
- 1962 - Acı Hayat ~ Mehmet
- 1962 - Allah Seviniz Dedi
- 1962 - Küçük Hanımın Şöförü
- 1962 - Çifte Nikah
- 1962 - Küçük Hanımın Kısmeti
- 1962 - Rıfat Diye Biri ~ Rıfat
- 1962 - Belalı Torun
- 1963 - Bahriyeli Ahmet ~ Bahriyeli Ahmet
- 1963 - Şaşkın Baba
- 1963 - İlk Göz Ağrısı ~ Turgut
- 1963 - Şıpsevdi
- 1963 - Küçük Beyin Kısmeti
- 1963 - İki Kocalı Kadın
- 1963 - Kırık Anahtar
- 1963 - Helal Olsun Ali Abi
- 1963 - Maceralar Kralı
- 1963 - Yavaş Gel Güzelim
- 1963 - Yaralı Aslan
- 1963 - Ayşecik Canımın İçi
- 1964 - Kral Arkadaşım
- 1964 - Hızlı Yaşayanlar
- 1964 - Kanun Karşısında
- 1964 - Muhteşem Serseri
- 1964 - Öp Annemin Elini
- 1964 - Kadın Terzisi
- 1964 - Halk Çocuğu
- 1964 - Katilin Kızı
- 1964 - Koçum Benim
- 1964 - Taşralı Kız ~ Necmi
- 1964 - Hızır Dede
- 1964 - Şahane Züğürtler
- 1964 - Kadın Berberi ~ Erol
- 1964 - Şoförler Kralı
- 1965 - Fişek Necmi
- 1965 - Namusum İçin
- 1965 - Sevinç Gözyaşları
- 1965 - Sonsuz Geceler
- 1965 - Yasak Cennet
- 1965 - Kadın İsterse
- 1965 - Güneşe Giden Yol
- 1965 - Kolejli Kızın Aşkı ~ Ayhan
- 1965 - Tamirci Parçası ~ Demir
- 1965 - Sayılı Dakikalar
- 1965 - ŞoförKızı
- 1966 - Allahaısmarladık İstanbul
- 1966 - Vur Emri ~ Ali
- 1966 - Kanun Benim
- 1966 - İdam Mahkumu ~ Ahmet
- 1966 - İstanbul Dehşet İçinde ~ Kemal
- 1966 - Siyah Otomobil
- 1966 - Altın Kollu Adam
- 1966 - Katiller de Ağlar
- 1966 - Kumarbazın İntikamı
- 1966 - Aslan Pençesi
- 1966 - Bıçaklar Fora
- 1967 - Demir Bilek
- 1967 - Yalnız Adam
- 1967 - Küçük Hanımefendi ~ Bülent
- 1967 - Büyük Kin
- 1967 - Krallar Ölmez ~ Ajan Murat
- 1967 - Ölüm Saati
- 1967 - Kızıl Tehlike
- 1967 - Beni Katil Ettiler
- 1967 - Aslan Yürekli Kabadayı
- 1967 - Gecelerin Kralı
- 1967 - Galatalı Mustafa
- 1967 - Acı Günler ~ Turgut
- 1967 - Yıkılan Gurur
- 1968 - Erikler Çiçek Açtı
- 1969 - Sevdiğim Adam
- 1969 - Sabah Olmasın
- 1969 - Ayşecik Yuvanın Bekçileri ~ Murat
- 1969 - Yılan Soyu
- 1969 - Tel Örgü
- 1969 - Fato ~ Yüzbaşı Kemal
- 1969 - Cingöz Recai
- 1969 - Yuvanın Bekçileri
- 1969 - Hayatımın Erkeği
- 1969 - Karlıdağ`daki Ateş
- 1970 - Yaşamak Kolay Değil
- 1970 - Küçük Hanımın Şoförü
- 1970 - Gölgedeki Adam ~ Ekrem
- 1970 - Ölünceye Kadar ~ Nejat
- 1970 - Zindandan Gelen Mektup
- 1970 - Şampiyon
- 1970 - Öleceksek Ölelim ~Akmeşeli Dinar
- 1970 - Dağların Kartalı
- 1970 - Çalınmış Hayat
- 1970 - Bütün Aşklar Tatlı Başlar
- 1971 - Şerefimle Yaşarım ~ Murat
- 1971 - Herşeyim Sensin
- 1971 - Ölümden Korkmuyorum
- 1971 - Fatoş Sokakların Meleği
- 1971 - Sezercik Yavrum Benim ~ Tarık
- 1971 - Beyoğlu Kanunu ~Vedat
- 1972 - Büyük Bela
- 1972 - Kanun Adamı
- 1972 - Kırık Merdiven ~ Kemal
- 1972 - Kader Yolcuları
- 1972 - Beyaz Kurt
- 1972 - Oğlum
- 1972 - Yirmi Yıl Sonra ~ Nazım
- 1973 - Kızın Varsa Derdin Var
- 1973 - Kara Haydar ~ Haydar
- 1974 - The Hand That Feeds the Dead
- 1974 - Lover of the Monster
- 1975 - Haşhaş
- 1975 - Harakiri
- 1976 - Örgüt
- 1976 - Kana Kan
- 1977 - Yangın
- 1979 - Ölüm Benimdir
