= Hulusi Kentmen =

Turkish actor

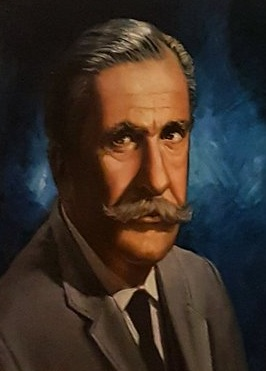
- Born: 20 January 1912; Tarnovo, Bulgaria
- Died: 20 December 1993 (aged 81); Istanbul, Turkey
- Occupations: Petty officer, actor
- Years active: 1934–1992
- Spouse(s): Refika Kentmen; Sevinç Aktansel
- Children: 3

Hulusi Kentmen (20 January 1912 – 20 December 1993) was a Turkish actor.

He was born in Tarnovo, Bulgaria, in 1912. He studied at petty officer preparatory school and graduated with 3rd class petty officer rank. After serving in the navy for a long time, he took up acting. He acted in the play Hisse-i Şaiya and made his film debut in 1940 with Sürtük. Between 1942 and 1988, he acted in over 500 films. In 1967, he went on an Anatolian tour with Hüseyin Baradan, Şahin Tek and later with Atıf Kaptan.
