= Cahit Irgat =

Turkish actor

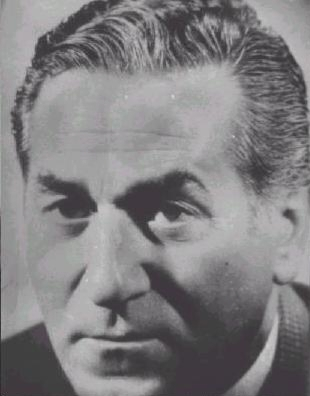
- Born: 21 March 1914; Lüleburgaz, Ottoman Empire
- Died: 5 June 1971 (aged 57); Istanbul, Turkey
- Occupation: Actor
- Years active: 1930-1970

Cahit Irgat (21 March 1914 – 5 June 1971) was a Turkish actor. He appeared in more than one hundred films from 1930 to 1970.

== Selected filmography ==
=== Oyuncu olarak ===
- 1931: Drakula
- 1931: istanbul Sokakları'nda
- 1932: Bir Millet Uyanıyor
- 1932: Karım Beni Aldatırsa
- 1933: Cici Berber
- 1933: Leblebici Horhor Ağa
- 1933: Karım Beni Aldatırsa
- 1933: Söz Bir Allah Bir
- 1933: Fena Yol
- 1934: Leblebici Horhor Ağa
- 1934: Milyon Avcıları
- 1934: Aysel Bataklı Damın Kızı
- 1935: Aysel Bataklı Damın Kızı
- 1936: Size Nasıl Geliyorsa
- 1936: Intermezzo
- 1937: Güneşe Doğru
- 1937: Vatansız İnsanlar
- 1938: Boys Town
- 1938: Bir Kavuk Devrildi
- 1938: Doğan Çavuş
- 1938: Aynaroz Kadısı
- 1939: Intermezzo
- 1939: Allah'ın Cenneti
- 1939: Taş Parçası
- 1939: Tosun Paşa
- 1939: Bir Kavuk Devrildi
- 1940: Şehvet Kurbanı
- 1940: Akasya Palas
- 1940: Yılmaz Ali
- 1940: Nasreddin Hoca Düğünde
- 1941: Boys Town
- 1941: Sergeant York
- 1941: Kıvırcık Paşa
- 1941: Kahveci Güzeli
- 1942: Kıskanç
- 1942: Sürtük
- 1942: Duvaksız Gelin
- 1942: Kerem ile Aslı
- 1943: Dertli Pınar
- 1943: Nasreddin Hoca Düğünde
- 1943: On Üç Kahraman
- 1944: Hasret
- 1944: Deniz Kızı
- 1944: Günahsızlar
- 1944: Hürriyet Apartmanı
- 1945: Hürriyet Apartmanı
- 1945: Yayla Kartalı
- 1945: On Üç Kahraman
- 1946: Toros Çocuğu
- 1946: Domaniç Yolcusu
- 1946: Yanık Kaval
- 1946: Kızılırmak (Karakoyun)
- 1946: Senede Bir Gün
- 1947: Gençlik Günahı
- 1947: Büyük İtiraf
- 1947: Kerim'in Çilesi
- 1947: Seven Ne Yapmaz
- 1947: Yanık Kaval
- 1947: Yara
- 1947: Bağdagül
- 1947: Yuvamı Yıkamazsın
- 1947: Bir Dağ Masalı
- 1947: Hülya
- 1947: Karanlık Yollar
- 1948: İstiklal Madalyası
- 1948: Harmankaya
- 1948: Damga
- 1948: Akıncılar
- 1948: Bir Yabancı
- 1948: Domaniç Yolcusu
- 1948: Keloğlan
- 1948: Canavar
- 1948: Çıldıran Kadın
- 1948: Düşkünler (Beyaz Baykuş)
- 1948: Dümbüllü Macera Peşinde
- 1948: Efe Aşkı
- 1948: Günahım
- 1948: Tuzak
- 1948: Silik Çehreler
- 1948: Kanlı Taşlar
- 1948: Sızlayan Kalp
- 1948: Kahraman Mehmet
- 1949: Fato Ya İstiklal Ya Ölüm
- 1949: Baba Katili
- 1949: Uçuruma Doğru
- 1949: Dinmeyen Sızı
- 1949: Er Meydanı
- 1949: Kanlı Döşek
- 1949: Ayşe'nin Duası
- 1949: Günahım
- 1949: Ölünceye Kadar Seninim
- 1949: Vurun Kahpeye
- 1950: Bir Fırtına Gecesi
- 1950: istanbul Geceleri
- 1950: Bırakılan Çocuk
- 1950: Estergon Kalesi
- 1950: Kapanan Gözler
- 1950: Onu Affettim
- 1950: Lüküs Hayat
- 1950: Harman Sonu Dönüşü
- 1950: Çete
- 1950: Oğlum İçin
- 1950: Sihirli Define
- 1950: Söyleyin Anama Ağlamasın
- 1950: Parmaksız Salih
- 1950: Soysuz
- 1950: Ateşten Gömlek
- 1950: Allah Kerim
- 1950: Zülfikârın Gölgesinde
- 1950: Üçüncü Selim'in Gözdesi
- 1951: Hayat Acıları Gülnaz
- 1951: Dudaktan Kalbe
- 1951: Evli Mi Bekar Mı
- 1951: Ali ile Veli (Cemile Sultan)
- 1951: Ankara Casusu Çiçero
- 1951: Demir Perde
- 1951: Güldağlı Cemile
- 1951: Hürriyet Şarkısı
- 1951: Kendini Kurtaran Şehir Şanlı Maraş
- 1951: Kore'de Türk Kahramanları
- 1951: Allahaısmarladık
- 1951: Vatan İçin
- 1951: Barbaros Hayrettin Paşa
- 1951: Yavuz Sultan Selim ve Yeniçeri Hasan
- 1951: Vatan ve Namık Kemal
- 1951: İstanbul'un Fethi
- 1951: Lale Devri
- 1952: Drakula İstanbul'da
- 1952: Sabahsız Geceler
- 1952: İngiliz Kemal Lawrense Karşı
- 1952: Göçmen Çocuğu
- 1952: İmralı'dan Doğan Güneş
- 1952: Kan Kardeşler
- 1952: Kızıltuğ
- 1952: Kubilay
- 1952: Kanun Namına
- 1952: Edi ile Büdü Tiyatrocu
- 1952: Edi ile Büdü
- 1952: Yıldırım Beyazıt Ve Timurlenk
- 1952: Can Yoldaşı
- 1952: Deli
- 1952: Yavuz Sultan Selim Ağlıyor
- 1953: Altı Ölü Var İpsala Cinayeti
- 1953: Mahallenin Namusu
- 1953: Aşk Istıraptır
- 1953: Cinci Hoca
- 1953: Kezban
- 1953: Vahşi İntikam
- 1953: Gizli Yara
- 1953: Soygun
- 1953: Katil
- 1953: Deli
- 1953: Yıldırım Beyazıt ve Timurlenk
- 1953: Balıkçı Güzeli Binikinci Gece
- 1954: Sahildeki Kadın
- 1954: Yaban Kız
- 1954: Ahretten Gelen Adam
- 1954: Şimal Yıldızı
- 1954: Paydos
- 1954: Feleğin Sillesi
- 1954: Leylaklar Altında
- 1955: Safiye Sultan
- 1955: Sevdiğim Sendin
- 1955: Bir Aşk Hikayesi
- 1955: Battal Gazi Geliyor
- 1955: Kahpenin Aşkı
- 1955: Günahkar Baba
- 1956: Günah Bizimdir
- 1956: Büyük Sır
- 1956: Kara Çalı
- 1956: Kalbimin Şarkısı
- 1956: Beş Hasta Var
- 1957: Kamelyalı Kadın Günahsız Fahişe
- 1957: Kanlı Çevre / Sönen Ocak
- 1957: Kahpenin Aşkı
- 1957: Beş Hasta Var
- 1957: Bir Avuç Toprak
- 1957: Bir Serseri
- 1957: Acı Günler
- 1958: Ağlarsa Anam Ağlar
- 1958: Karasu
- 1958: Üç Arkadaş
- 1958: Doksan Dokuz Mustafa
- 1958: Bu Vatanın Çocukları
- 1958: Alageyik
- 1958: Dokuz Dağın Efesi Çakıcı Geliyor
- 1959: Kıtipiyoz'a Tuzak / Fosforlu'nun Oyunu
- 1959: Zümrüt
- 1959: Kalpaklılar
- 1959: Tütün Zamanı
- 1959: Kırık Plak
- 1959: Düşman Yolları Kesti
- 1959: Bu Vatanın Çocukları
- 1959: Alageyik
- 1960: Aliii
- 1960: Gece Kuşu
- 1960: Sığıntı
- 1960: Taş Bebek
- 1960: Köyde Bir Kız Sevdim
- 1960: Aşk Rüzgârı
- 1960: Dişi Kurt
- 1961: Yasak Aşk
- 1961: Yılanların Öcü
- 1961: Yaman Gazeteci
- 1961: Yumurcak
- 1962: Sokak Kızı
- 1962: Yılanların Öcü
- 1962: Zorla Evlendik
- 1962: Fatoş'un Bebekleri
- 1963: Barut Fıçısı
- 1963: Badem Şekeri
- 1963: Zorla Evlendik
- 1963: Çapkın Kız
- 1963: ilk Göz Ağrısı
- 1963: Şaşkın Baba
- 1963: Susuz Yaz
- 1963: Genç Kızlar
- 1963: Zehir Hafiye
- 1963: Dişi Kurt
- 1964: Susuz Yaz
- 1964: Dullar Tercih Edilir
- 1964: Mor Defter
- 1964: Şeytanın Uşakları
- 1964: Son Tren
- 1964: On Korkusuz Adam
- 1964: Fıstık Gibi Maşallah
- 1964: Affetmeyen Kadın
- 1964: istanbul Sokakları'nda
- 1964: Prangasız Mahkumlar
- 1964: Her Gün Ölmektense
- 1964: istanbul Sokakları'nda
- 1964: Koçero
- 1964: Kamalı Zeybek
- 1964: Vurun Kahpeye
- 1964: Keşanlı Ali Destanı
- 1965: Muradın Türküsü
- 1965: Sana Layık Değilim
- 1965: Çapkınlar Kralı
- 1965: Dört Deli Bir Aptal
- 1965: Dünkü Çocuk
- 1965: Ekmekçi Kadın
- 1965: Keşanlı Ali Destanı
- 1965: Güzel Bir Gün İçin
- 1965: Hırsız
- 1965: Kahreden Darbe
- 1965: Kasımpaşalı
- 1965: Kasımpaşalı / Korkunç Vurgun
- 1965: Kasımpaşalı Recep
- 1965: Murtaza
- 1965: Şeker Hafiye
- 1965: Severek Ölenler / Kartalların Öcü
- 1965: Siyah Gözler
- 1965: Hüseyin Baradan Çekilin Aradan
- 1965: Tehlikeli Adam
- 1965: Konyakçı
- 1965: Sürtük
- 1965: Buzlar Çözülmeden
- 1965: Yaralı Kartal
- 1965: Bir Millet Uyanıyor
- 1965: Karaoğlan Altay'dan Gelen Yiğit
- 1965: Senede Bir Gün
- 1966: Damgalı Kadın
- 1966: Ölüm Temizler
- 1966: Sana Layık Değilim
- 1966: Silahların Kanunu
- 1966: Karaoğlan Baybora'nın Oğlu
- 1966: Aşk Mücadelesi
- 1966: Aslanların Dönüşü
- 1966: Bar Kızı
- 1966: Dertli Gönüller
- 1966: Erkek Severse
- 1966: Fakir Çocuklar
- 1966: Fatih'in Fedaisi
- 1966: İdam Mahkumu
- 1966: İhtiras Kurbanları
- 1966: İntikam Ateşi
- 1966: Kanlı Mezar
- 1966: Kıran Kırana
- 1966: Meleklerin İntikamı
- 1966: Meydan Köpeği
- 1966: Para Kadın Ve Silah
- 1966: Yedi Dağın Aslanı
- 1966: Sokak Kızı
- 1966: Bir Millet Uyanıyor
- 1966: Ölüm Tarlası
- 1966: Allahaısmarladık
- 1966: Hudutların Kanunu
- 1966: Çalıkuşu
- 1966: At Avrat Silah
- 1966: Senede Bir Gün
- 1966: Altın Küpeler
- 1967: Acı Günler
- 1967: Aslan Yürekli Kabadayı
- 1967: Caniler Kralı Killing
- 1967: Çelik Bilek
- 1967: Düşman Aşıklar
- 1967: Kara Duvaklı Gelin
- 1967: Kelepçeli Melek
- 1967: Killing Canilere Karşı
- 1967: Killing İstanbul'da
- 1967: Killing Uçan Adam'a Karşı
- 1967: Krallar Ölmez
- 1967: Kurbanlık Katil
- 1967: Ölüm Saati
- 1967: Soy Ve Öldür
- 1967: Hudutların Kanunu
- 1967: Çakırcalı Kamalı Zeybek Karşı
- 1967: Son Gece
- 1967: Kozanoğlu
- 1968: Sabahsız Geceler
- 1968: Alevli Yıllar
- 1968: Ana Hakkı Ödenmez
- 1968: Baharda Solan Çiçek
- 1968: Beşikteki Miras
- 1968: Casus Kıran
- 1968: Dağları Bekleyen Kız
- 1968: Erikler Çiçek Açtı
- 1968: Eşkiya Kanı (Hakimo)
- 1968: Gözyaşlarım
- 1968: İftira
- 1968: Kader
- 1968: Kızıl Maske
- 1968: Leylaklar Altında
- 1968: Ömrümün Tek Gecesi
- 1968: Sevemez Kimse Seni
- 1968: Son Vurgun
- 1968: Urfa İstanbul
- 1968: Yara
- 1968: İngiliz Kemal
- 1968: Şeyh Ahmet
- 1969: Ana Mezarı
- 1969: Yumurcak
- 1969: Anadolu Soygunu
- 1969: Fakir Kızı Leyla
- 1969: İntikam Yemini
- 1969: Lekeli Melek
- 1969: Ömercik Babasının Oğlu
- 1969: Sabır Taşı
- 1969: Seninle Ölmek İstiyorum
- 1969: Fato Ya İstiklal Ya Ölüm
- 1969: Vatan ve Namık Kemal
- 1969: Boğaziçi Soygunu
- 1970: Sürtük
- 1970: Casus Kıran / Yedi Canlı Adam
