= Osman F. Seden =

Turkish film director and screenwriter (1924–1998)

- Born: Osman Fahir Seden; March 22, 1924; Istanbul, Turkey
- Died: September 1, 1998 (aged 74); Istanbul, Turkey
- Occupations: Film director, screenwriter, film producer.
- Years active: 1940–1995

Osman Fahir Seden, usually credited as Osman F. Seden (March 22, 1924 – September 1, 1998), was a Turkish film director, screenwriter and film producer.

== Filmography ==
Osman directed and wrote for over 120 films between 1955 and 1989.

- They Paid With Their Blood (1955)
- Sönen Yıldız (1956)
- Revenge of the Flame (1956)
- Berdus (1957)
- A Handful of Soil (1957)
- Altın Kafes (1958)
- Beraber Ölelim (1958)
- The Broken Disk (1959)
- Gurbet (1959)
- Düşman Yolları Kesti (1959)
- Cilalı İbo Yıldızlar Arasında (1959)
- For Chastity (1960)
- Aşktan da Üstün (1961)
- İki Aşk Arasında (1961)
- Mahalleye Gelen Gelin (1961)
- Aşk Hırsızı (1961)
- Güzeller Resmi Geçidi (1961)
- Sokak Kızı (1962)
- Külhan Aşkı (1962)
- Cilalı İbo Rüyalar Aleminde (1962)
- Ayşecik Yavru Melek (1962)
- Ne Şeker Şey (1962)
- Yaralı Aslan (1963)
- Kin (1963)
- Bana Annemi Anlat (1963)
- Badem Şekeri (1963)
- Beni Osman Öldürdü (1963)
- Anadolu Çocuğu (1964)
- Koçum Benim (1964)
- Beş Şeker Kız (1964)
- Hızır Dede (1964)
- Kral Arkadaşım (1964)
- Affetmeyen Kadın (1964)
- Sevinç Gözyaşları (1965)
- Severek Ölenler: Kartalların Öcü (1965)
- Şaka ile Karışık (1965)
- Seven Kadın Unutmaz (1965)
- Sana Layık Değilim (1965)
- Elveda Sevgilim (1965)
- Düğün Gecesi (1966)
- Meleklerin İntikamı (1966)
- Kenarın Dilberi (1966)
- Akşam Güneşi (1966)
- Çalıkuşu (1966)
- Ağlayan Kadın (1967)
- Hindistan Cevizi (1967)
- Merhamet (1967)
- İngiliz Kemal'in Oğlu (1968)
- Hicran Gecesi (1968)
- Gül ve Şeker (1968)
- Ana Hakkı Ödenmez (1968)
- Ottoman Eagle (1969)
- Mısır'dan Gelen Gelin (1969)
- Gülnaz Sultan (1969)
- Yiğitlerin Türküsü (1970)
- Mazi Kalbimde Yaradır (1970)
- Son Günah (1970)
- Her Günaha Bir Kurşun (1970)
- Cilalı İbo Almanya'da (1970)
- Tanrı Şahidimdir (1971)
- Newyorklu Kız (1971)
- İbiş Newyork Canavarı (1971)
- Herşey Oğlum İçin (1971)
- Gülüm, Dalım, Çiçeğim (1971)
- Fakir Aşıkların Romanı (1971)
- Yirmi Yıl Sonra (1972)
- Mahkum (1972)
- İlk Aşk (1972)
- Aslanların Ölümü (1972)
- Rabia (1973)
- Hazreti Ömer'in Adaleti (1973)
- Gurbetçiler (1973)
- Gazi Kadın (1973)
- Yaban (1974)
- Erkekler Ağlamaz (1974)
- Yaz Bekarı (1974)
- Çirkin Dünya (1974)
- Yüz Lira ile Evlenilmez (1974)
- Teşekkür Ederim Büyükanne (1975)
- Ateş Böceği (1975)
- Bırakın Yaşayalım (1975)
- Bir Ana Bir Kız (1975)
- Nereden Çıktı Bu Velet (1975)
- Güler misin Ağlar mısın (1975)
- Beş Milyoncuk Borç Verir misin (1975)
- Batsın Bu Dünya (1975)
- Nereye Bakıyor Bu Adamlar (1976)
- Her Gönülde Bir Aslan Yatar (1976)
- Devlerin Aşkı (1976)
- Delicesine (1976)
- Bıktım Her Gün Ölmekten (1976)
- Yuvanın Bekçileri (1977)
- Meryem ve Oğulları (1977)
- Hatasız Kul Olmaz (1977)
- Vahşi Gelin (1978)
- Şeref Sözü (1978)
- Ana Ocağı (1978)
- Silah Arkadaşları (1978)
- Yüz Numaralı Adam (1978)
- İyi Aile Çocuğu (1978)
- İnek Şaban (1978)
- Çilekeş (1978)
- İnsan Sevince (1979)
- Dokunmayın Şabanıma (1979)
- Bekçiler Kralı (1979)
- Beddua (1980)
- Vazgeç Gönlüm (1980)
- Durdurun Dünyayı (1980)
- Ben Topraktan Bir Canım (1980)
- Beş Parasız Adam (1980)
- Şaka Yapma (1981)
- Günah Defteri (1981)
- Bir Damla Ateş (1981)
- Kördüğüm (1982)
- Yakılacak Kadın (1982)
- Görgüsüzler (1982)
- Sen de mi Leyla (1982)
- Islak Mendil (1982)
- Hülyam (1982)
- Hasret Sancısı (1982)
- Aşkların En Güzeli (1982)
- Kahır (1983)
- Haram (1983)
- Gecelerin Kadını (1983)
- Futboliye (1983)
- Damga (1984)
- Yabancı (1984)
- Ömrümün Tek Gecesi (1984)
- Nefret (1984)
- Karanfilli Naciye (1984)
- Tele Kızlar (1985)
- Aslan Oğlum (1986)
- Akrep (1986)
- Dişi Kurt (1987)
- Namusun Bedeli (1989)
