= Cahide Sonku =

Turkish actress and film director

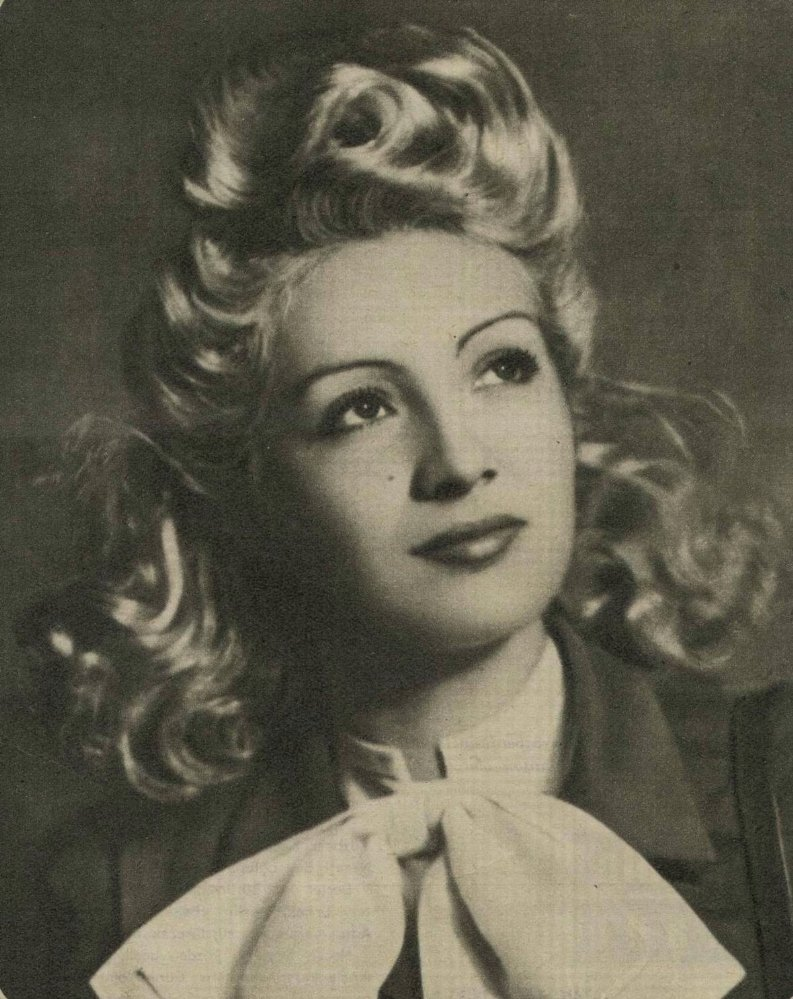
- Born: Cahide Serap; December 27, 1912; Sanaa, Yemen
- Died: 18 March 1981 (aged 68); Istanbul, Turkey
- Occupations: Actress, model, writer, film director
- Years active: 1930–1980
- Spouse(s): Talat Artemel (1936–1938; divorced); İhsan Doruk (1943–1954; divorced)
- Children: Ender Doruk (daughter)

Cahide Sonku (born Cahide Serap; 27 December 1912 – 18 March 1981) was a Turkish actress, model, writer and the first female film director in Turkey. Sonku was the founder of her own movie production company, Sonku Film, in 1950. She was thrice married and divorced.

== Life ==
Sonku' first theater and cinema experience was during her secondary school education. She was accepted into Darülbedayi when she was only 16 years old, and in time she took her place among the most popular actors of Istanbul City Theatres. She started acting with "Seven Village Zeynebi" first at the People's Houses Theater, then at the Istanbul Municipality Conservatory, and then at Darülbedayi (1932-City Theaters), discovered by Muhsin Ertuğrul who was an important figure in Sonku's career.

Sonku founded the production company "Sonku Film" in 1950 and however went bankrupt in 1963 due to a fire that burned down the company building. She continued working at the City Theater through Muhsin Ertuğrul's influence, then left and struggled with alcohol addiction in the last years of her life.

Sonku received the Turkish Film Critics Association service award in 1979 and died in 1981 at the Alkazar Cinema in Istanbul, at the age of 61. She was buried in Zincirlikuyu Cemetery. Cahide Sonku Prize is awarded in her memory at the annual Antalya Golden Orange Film Festival.

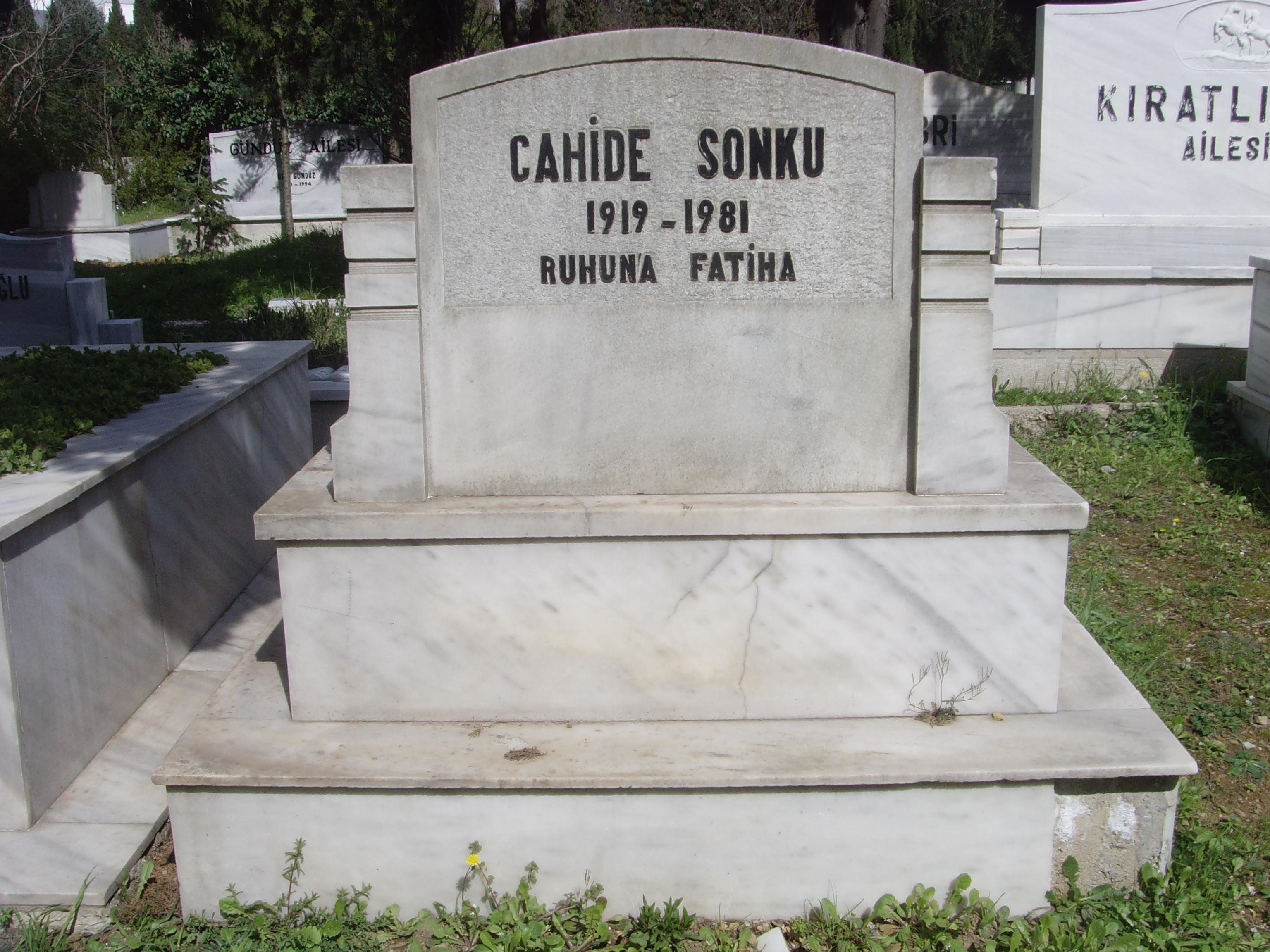
Grave of Cahide Sonku, Zincirlikuyu Cemetery, Istanbul.

== Cultural depictions ==
- In 1989, the series Cahide is based from life of Cahide Sonku. It starring Hale Soygazi as Cahide.
- In 2013, the short film "Kayıkçı" starring Merih Fırat as Cahide.
- In 2014, the short film "100-5=Cahide" starring Farah Zeynep Abdullah as Cahide.
- In 2016, the short film "Cahide" starring İpek Bilgin as Cahide.

== Filmography ==
Year	Film	Duty				Notes
Year	Film	Actor	Director	Producer	Role	Notes
1933	Söz Bir Allah Bir	Yes				
1934	Bataklı Damın Kızı Aysel	Yes			Aysel	
1940	Şehvet Kurbanı	Yes				
1940	Akasya Palas	Yes				
1942	Kıskanç	Yes				
1945	Yayla Kartalı	Yes			Nermin	
1946	Senede Bir Gün	Yes			Nazlı	
1946	Kızılırmak Karakoyun	Yes				
1947	Yuvamı Yıkamazsın	Yes				
1949	Fedakar Ana	Yes	Yes			
1951	Vatan ve Namık Kemal	Yes	Yes			Co-directed with Talat Artemel and Sami Ayanoğlu.
1952	Günahını Ödeyen Adam	Yes				
1953	Beklenen Şarkı	Yes	Yes	Yes		
1955	İlk ve Son	Yes				
1956	Büyük Sır	Yes				
1962	Ayşecik Yavru Melek	Yes				
1965	Yahya Peygamber	Yes				
1965	Korkusuzlar	Yes				
1965	Düşman Kardeşler	Yes				
1965	Beyaz Atlı Adam	Yes				
1965	Sevgim ve Gururum	Yes				
1966	Sevda Çiçeğim	Yes				
1966	Kovboy Ali	Yes				
1966	El Kızı	Yes				
1966	Çalıkuşu	Yes				
1966	At Avrat Silah	Yes				
1966	Sokak Kızı	Yes				
1967	Serseriler Kralı	Yes				
1967	Bizansı Titreten Yiğit	Yes				
1971	Mıstık	Yes				
