= Kriton Ilyadis =

Turkish cinematographer

- Born: 16 January 1916; Adapazarı, Turkey
- Died: 1 September 1980 (aged 64); Istanbul, Turkey
- Occupation: cinematographer.
- Years active: 1932—1980

Kriton Ilyadis (16 January 1916 - 1 September 1980) was a Turkish cinematographer of Greek origin.

He was responsible for the cinematography of 124 films between 1944 and 1973.

Of Greek origin, İlyadis learned film and photography by working alongside his father. He graduated from the secondary school of Saint Michel French High School in Istanbul. He worked as a photographer for a time and worked in film laboratories. He began his cinematography career with Baha Gelenbevi's Deniz Kızı (The Mermaid) (1944). He was chosen as best cameraman at various film festivals for his cinematography work on the films "Köldüren Şehir" (The Dead City) (1954), "Beraber Ölelim" (Let's Die Together) (1958), "Octopus's Arms" (1964), and "Kınalı Yapıncak" (1969). Kriton İlyadis, who shot hundreds of films between 1944 and 1977, is one of the longest-serving filmmakers in this field. He is the brother of Yorgo İlyadis.
