= International Istanbul Film Festival =

Annual film festival held in Istanbul, Turkey

Coordinates: 39°55′N 32°51′E

Istanbul Film Festival

- 40th edition poster
- Location: Istanbul, Turkey
- Founded: 1982
- Most recent: 2026
- Hosted by: Istanbul Foundation for Culture and Arts
- Language: International
- Website: film.iksv.org/en

Current: 45th Istanbul Film Festival
- 46th 44th

The Istanbul Film Festival (Turkish: İstanbul Film Festivali) is the first and oldest international film festival in Turkey, organised by the Istanbul Foundation for Culture and Arts. It is held every year in April in movie theaters in Istanbul, Turkey. As mentioned in its regulations, the festival aims to encourage the development of cinema in Turkey and to promote films of quality in the Turkish cinema market.

The 40th edition of the festival was held from April 1 to June 29, 2021, in hybrid format.

== History ==
The Istanbul International Film Festival was first organized in 1982, within the frame of the International Istanbul Festival as a "Film Week" consisting of six films. The theme of the films participating in the Festival was limited to "Arts and Cinema", to keep the event within the context of the International Istanbul Festival. In 1983 the event was realized under the title of "Istanbul Filmdays", taking place throughout the Festival within a span of a month.

Beginning from 1984, the event gained an identity as a separate activity; it was shifted to the month of April. In 1985, two competitive sections, one being national and the other international, were included in the festival program. From 1987 on, "Cinema Honorary Awards" began to be presented.

In the following years, The Istanbul International Filmdays firmly established its position and took its place among the major film festivals of the world with the large number of films shown and the quality and versatility of its program.

At the beginning of 1989 the event was recognized as "a competitive specialized festival" by International Federation of Film Producers Associations (FIAPF) and was accredited. Parallel to this development, "Istanbul Filmdays" was renamed as "Istanbul International Film Festival".

Beginning from 1996, "Lifetime Achievement Awards" along with "Cinema Honorary Awards" began to be presented to international cineastes, actors and actresses.

Istanbul International Film Festival 23rd edition logo

In 2006, celebrating its 25th year, the festival created a meeting platform for Turkish and European film professionals under the title "Meetings on the Bridge", aiming to bring European film institutions with Turkish directors and producers to discuss funding possibilities. Also in 2006, Azize Tan, the then assistant director of the festival replaced Hülya Uçansu as director.

In 2007, the Council of Europe, in collaboration with Eurimages, started to present the Film Award of the Council of Europe (FACE) to a film selected from the entries in the Human Rights and Cinema section of the festival. The Council of Europe and later Eurimages support for this award was discontinued in 2020.

With its 28th edition in 2009, the festival began to give its Golden Tulip Award also as a result of its National Competition.

The festival dropped the "international" from its title in 2011. Azize Tan was replaced by the assistant director of the festival, Kerem Ayan, in 2015. In 2016, the festival changed the theme of the international competition to "new perspectives in cinema."

Since the beginning of the Festival, a total of 2,065,000 spectators have attended the screenings of 2,330 films from 72 different countries (2005 figures). The festival boasted an audience of 170,000 in 2007, breaking its own record.

== Censorship ==
In 1988, government inspectors forced the withdrawal of 5 of 160 films that are to be screened at the festival. Jean-Jacques Beineix's Betty Blue and Vedreba (The Plea) by Tengiz Abuladze were among these five works. Vedreba was being blocked on the grounds that it was "anti-Islamic" and cuts from the other four films were demanded because of erotic scenes.

Upon the notification by the censorship board that certain films on the program were to be banned, the then president of the Golden Tulip Jury, Elia Kazan, organised a protest march with the participation of Turkish filmmakers. The Turkish Ministry of Culture subsequently issued a decree holding all international film festivals exempt from censorship.

== Program ==
The selection and programming of the festival films is conducted by the selection committee and the advisory board. The program consists of an international competition open only to feature and animated films on art and artists or literary adaptations, a national competition, non-competitive, informative sections on specific themes which can include documentaries, shorts and feature films.

The 2008 program which includes 200 films comprises the following sections:

- International Competition
- Turkish Cinema 2007-8
  - National Competition
  - Out of Competition
  - Documentaries
- Festival Awards Screenings
- Special Screening: Turkish Classics Revisited
- Human Rights in Cinema
- Galas
- Challenging the Years
- From the World of Festivals
- Young Masters
- Documentary Time with NTV
- American Independents
- Mined Zone
- Midnight Madness
- Woman is Her Name
- From the Caucasus to the Mediterranean
  - Medscreen Arab Film Promotion
- Kids' Menu
- The World of Animation: Alexander Petrov
- '68 and its Heritage
- Marc Caro: Lost in Illusions
- In Memoriam
- Nokia Nseries Short Film Competition

== Awards list ==
These awards are presented within the context of the festival:

- Golden Tulip (for the best film in the international competition)
- Golden Tulip (Best Film in the National Competition as of 2010, formerly Best Turkish Film of the Year)
- Best Turkish Director of the Year
- Special Prize of the Jury (in memory of Onat Kutlar)
- Best Actor and Best Actress (national competition)
- FIPRESCI Prize (national -in memory of Onat Kutlar- and international competitions)
- Human Rights in Cinema Award (previously FACE--Film Award of the Council of Europe, discontinued as of 2021)
- People's Choice Award (discontinued as of 2016)

== Golden Tulip winners ==
Year	Film	Director	Nationality
1985	1984	Michael Radford	United Kingdom; India
1986	Yesterday	Radosław Piwowarski	Poland
1987	Guard Me, My Talisman (Khrani menya, moj talisman)	Roman Balayan	Soviet Union
1988	Travelling Avant	Jean-Charles Tacchella	France
1989	A Film with No Name (Za Sada Bez Dobrog Naslova)	Srdjan Karanovic	Serbia
1990	Pomegranate and Cane (Nar O Nay)	Saeed Ebrahimifar	Iran
1991	Farendj	Sabine Prenczina	France
1992	Life on a String (Bian Zou Bian Chang)	Chen Kaige	China
1993	Manila Paloma Blanca	Daniele Segre	Italy
1994	The Blue Exile (Mavi Sürgün)	Erden Kıral	Turkey
1995	The Silences of the Palace (Saimt el Qusur)	Moufida Tlatli	Tunisia
1996	Little Sister (Zusje)	Robert Jan Westdijk	Netherlands
1997	The King of Masks (Bian Lian)	Wu Tian-ming	China
1998	Ayneh (The Mirror)	Jafar Panahi	Iran
1999	El Viento se Llevó lo Qué (Gone with the Wind)	Alejandro Agresti	Argentina
2000	Clouds of May (Mayıs Sıkıntısı)	Nuri Bilge Ceylan	Turkey
2001	No Place to Go (Die Unberührbare)	Oskar Roehler	Germany
2002	Magonia	Ineke Smits	Netherlands
2003	Suddenly (Tan de repente)	Diego Lerman	Argentina
2004	Goodbye, Dragon Inn (Bu San)	Tsai Ming-liang	Taiwan
2005	La Femme de Gilles	Frédéric Fonteyne	Belgium
2005	Café Lumière	Hou Hsiao-hsien	Taiwan
2006	A Cock and Bull Story	Michael Winterbottom	United Kingdom
2007	Reprise	Joachim Trier	Norway
2008	Egg (Yumurta)	Semih Kaplanoğlu	Turkey
2009	Tony Manero	Pablo Larraín	Chile
2010	The Misfortunates	Felix Van Groeningen	Belgium
2011	Microphone	Ahmad Abdalla	Egypt
2012	The Loneliest Planet	Julia Loktev	Russia; United States
2013	What Richard Did	Lenny Abrahamson	Ireland
2014	Blind	Eskil Vogt	Norway
2015	Cancelled		
2016	Un Monstruo de Mil Cabezas	Rodrigo Plá	Mexico
2017	The Ornithologist	João Pedro Rodrigues	Portugal
2018	Western	Valeska Grisebach	Germany
2019	House of Hummingbird (Beol-sae / 벌새)	Kim Bora	South Korea
2020	Atlantis (Atlantyda / Атлантида)	Valentyn Vasyanovych	Ukraine
2021	Madalena	Madiano Marcheti	Brazil
2022	Vortex	Gaspar Noé	France
2023	World War III (Jang-e jahani sevom / جنگ جهانی سوم)	Houman Seyyedi	Iran
2024	Forever-Forever (Nazavzhdy-Nazavzhdy / Назавжди-Назавжди)	Anna Buryachkova	Ukraine; Netherlands
2025	Lesson Learned	Bálint Szimler	Hungary

== Other awards ==
=== National Competition ===
Year	Film	Director
1985	Bir Yudum Sevgi (A Sip of Love)	Atıf Yılmaz
1986	Züğürt Ağa (the Agha); Amansız Yol (Desperate Road); Adı Vasfiye (Her Name Is Vasfiye)	Nesli Çölgeçen; Ömer Kavur; Atıf Yılmaz
1987	Anayurt Oteli (Motherland Hotel)	Ömer Kavur
1988	Biri ve Diğerleri (One and the Others)	Tunç Başaran
1989	Don't Let Them Shoot the Kite (Uçurtmayı Vurmasınlar)	Tunç Başaran
1990	Karartma Geceleri (Blackout Nights)	Yusuf Kurçenli
1991	Camdan Kalp (A Heart of Glass)	Fehmi Yaşar
1992	Gizli Yüz (Secret Face)	Ömer Kavur
1993	İki Kadın (Two Women)	Yavuz Özkan
1994	Bir Sonbahar Hikâyesi (An Autumn Story)	Yavuz Özkan
1995	İz (Traces)	Yeşim Ustaoğlu
1996	80. Adım (The 80th Step)	Tomris Giritlioğlu
1997	Akrebin Yolculuğu (Journey of the Clock-hand)	Ömer Kavur
1998	Masumiyet (Innocence)	Zeki Demirkubuz
1999	Güneşe Yolculuk (Journey to the Sun)	Yeşim Ustaoğlu
2000	Mayıs Sıkıntısı (Clouds of May)	Nuri Bilge Ceylan
2001	Dar Alanda Kısa Paslaşmalar (Offside); Herkes Kendi Evinde (Away From Home)	Serdar Akar; Semih Kaplanoğlu
2002	9	Ümit Ünal
2003	Uzak (Distant)	Nuri Bilge Ceylan
2004	Karpuz Kabuğundan Gemiler Yapmak (Boats Out of Watermelon Rinds)	Ahmet Uluçay
2005	Anlat İstanbul (Istanbul Tales)	Ümit Ünal, Kudret Sabancı, Selim Demirdelen, Yücel Yolcu, Ömür Atay
2006	Beş Vakit (Times and Winds)	Reha Erdem
2007	İklimler (Climates)	Nuri Bilge Ceylan
2008	Summer Book (Tatil Kitabı)	Seyfi Teoman
2009	Men on the Bridge (Köprüdekiler)	Aslı Özge
2010	Vavien	Yağmur Taylan, Durul Taylan
2011	Saç (Hair)	Tayfun Pirselimoğlu
2012	Tepenin Ardı (Beyond the Hill)	Emin Alper
2013	Thou Gild'st The Even (Sen Aydınlatırsın Geceyi)	Onur Ünlü
2014	Ben O Değilim (I Am Not Him)	Tayfun Pirselimoğlu
2015	Cancelled	
2016	Toz Bezi (Dust Cloth)	Ahu Öztürk
2017	Sarı Sıcak (Yellow Heat)	Fikret Reyhan
2018	Borç (Debt)	Vuslat Saraçoğlu
2019	Kız Kardeşler (A Tale of Three Sisters)	Emin Alper
2020	Aşk, Büyü, vs (Love, Spells and All That)	Ümit Ünal
2021	Beni Sevenler Listesi (The List of Those Who Love Me)	Emre Erdoğdu
2022	Klondike	Maryna Er Gorbach
2023	Kör Noktada (In the Blind Spot / Im toten Winkel)	Ayşe Polat
2024	Yurt (Dormitory)	Nehir Tuna

== Notable visitors ==
Notable visitors who attended the festival since 1982 include:

- Stefano Accorsi
- Tarık Akan
- Filiz Akın
- Ambra Angiolini
- Müjde Ar
- Asia Argento
- Cüneyt Arkın
- Sabine Azéma
- Romane Bohringer
- Ekrem Bora
- Claudia Cardinale
- Valentina Cervi
- Meltem Cumbul
- Charles Dance
- Ninetto Davoli
- Catherine Deneuve
- Gérard Depardieu
- Hannelore Elsner
- Fatma Girik
- İzzet Günay
- Mehmet Günsur
- Irm Hermann
- Ediz Hun
- Lee Kang-sheng
- Harvey Keitel
- Udo Kier
- Denis Lavant
- Sophia Loren
- Ian McKellen
- Jeanne Moreau
- Zuhal Olcay
- Greta Scacchi
- Ingvar Sigurdsson
- Hale Soygazi
- Şener Şen
- Türkan Şoray
- Greg Timmermans
- Nurgül Yeşilçay
- Serra Yılmaz
- Kôji Yakusho
- Larry Towell
- Antoine Bertrand
- Lars Eidinger
- Reinout Scholten van Aschat
- Vera Brandes
- Kerry Fox

Directors

- Kutluğ Ataman
- Neil Armfield
- Mani Haghighi
- Bernardo Bertolucci
- Béla Tarr
- Paul Schrader
- Tsai Ming-liang
- Park Chan-wook
- Dagur Kári
- Michael Radford
- Kerem Topuz
- Ferzan Özpetek
- Bahman Ghobadi
- Tom DiCillo
- Neil Jordan
- Jane Campion
- Claire Denis
- Alain Robbe-Grillet
- Sally Potter
- Bertrand Tavernier
- Vittorio De Seta
- Jean-Marc Vallée
- James Longley
- Jean-Paul Rappeneau
- Don Letts
- Otar Iosseliani
- Carlos Saura
- Nanni Moretti
- Theo Angelopoulos
- Chantal Akerman
- Paul Cox
- Abbas Kiarostami
- Jerry Schatzberg
- Bertrand Blier
- Don McKellar
- Carlos Sorín
- Youssef Chahine
- Sergei Gerasimov
- Károly Makk
- Emir Kusturica
- André Delvaux
- John Boorman
- Ömer Lütfi Akad
- Elia Kazan
- Jean-Charles Tacchella
- Nikita Mikhalkov
- Catherine Breillat
- Manuel Gutiérrez Aragón
- Sergei Paradjanov
- Hugh Hudson
- Jafar Panahi
- Bahram Bayzai
- Ken Russell
- Fatih Akın
- Mrinal Sen
- Bruno Dumont
- Nana Djordjadze
- Shaji N. Karun
- Marzieh Meshkini
- Ventura Pons
- Roger Corman
- Vittorio Taviani
- István Szabó
- Miklós Jancsó
- Reinhard Hauff
- Krzysztof Kieślowski
- Fernando Solanas
- Gillo Pontecorvo
- Chinghiz Aitmatov
- Andrei Konchalovsky
- Arturo Ripstein
- Arthur Penn
- Nagisa Oshima
- Claude Miller
- Ettore Scola
- Robert Wise
- Margarethe von Trotta
- Michelangelo Antonioni
- Peter Greenaway
- Claude Sautet
- Jiří Menzel
- Stephen Frears
- Jim Sheridan
- Christopher Hampton
- Francesco Rosi
- Gus Van Sant
- Alexander Sokurov
- Michael Ballhaus
- Tony Gatlif
- Abderrahmane Sissako
- Marc Caro
- William Klein
- Amos Gitai
- Semih Kaplanoğlu
- Jan Kounen
- Özgür Yıldırım
- Niels Christian Meyer
- Lech Majewski
- Nadine Labaki
- Handan İpekçi
- Mehmet Güreli
- Hüseyin Karabey
- Alain Corneau
- Nadine Trintignant
- Parvez Sharma
- Çağan Irmak
- Ramin Bahrani
- Nuri Bilge Ceylan
- Brad Anderson
- Bent Hamer
- Li Yang
- Lynne Ramsay
- Wim Wenders
- Gaspar Noé
- Dag Johan Haugerud
- Marianna Brennand
- Zabou Breitman
- Scandar Copti
- Ali Asgari
- Bachir Bensaddek
- Shekhar Kapur
- Sofia Bohdanowicz
- João Canijo
- Alexandre O. Philippe
