= Macit Koper =

Turkish actor and scriptwriter (born 1944)

- Born: 1 March 1944 (age 82); Beyoğlu, Istanbul, Turkey
- Occupations: Actor, scriptwriter
- Years active: 1978–present
- Spouses: Berrin Koper (divorced); Hülya Koper (died 2025)
- Children: 3

Macit Koper (born 1 March 1944) is a Turkish actor and scriptwriter.

He has worked as actor and director at Şehir Theatres and Dostlar Theatres. His cinematic breakthrough came with his role as Zebercet in the movie Anayurt Oteli.

== Life and career ==
He was born in Istanbul in 1944. He became interested in theatre after joining the Beşiktaş Community Center during his high school years. He was the student of actors such as Muhsin Ertuğrul, Beklan Algan and Ayla Algan at the LCC Theatre School.

He worked as an actor, dramatist and director at Dostlar Theatre between 1969 and 1979. He continued to work in this institution until the Dostlar Theater was closed for economic reasons in 1979. He joined the Istanbul City Theatres during the 1979/1980 season. He later went to Berlin to prepare a play about foreign workers. He also wrote and directed the play Giden, Tez Geri Dönmez. His career in theatre ended in 1980 after the 1980 Turkish coup d'état. He continued to work as an actor, director and writer at Dostlar Theatre. In the 1981–1982 season, he adapted Yaşar Kemal's novel Ağrı Dağı Efsanesi to a play.

Koper has worked as an actor and screenwriter in cinema and on stage. He started scriptwriting in 1983 with the movie Seni Seviyorum with the encouragement of Atıf Yılmaz. After writing the script for Rumuz Goncagül in 1987, he worked mainly with directors İrfan Tözüm and Ömer Kavur. As an actor, he starred in films such as Aaahh Belinda and Melodram. He received great acclaim for his success in the role of Zebercet in Anayurt Oteli. In 1989, he returned to his duty in City Theatres by court decision. He won many national and international awards in the fields of theatre and cinema both for acting and scriptwriting as well as directing. In 2013, he portrayed Lala Mustafa Pasha in the historical drama series Muhteşem Yüzyıl. In 2016, he was cast in Poyraz Karayel.

=== Personal ===
He is married to Hülya Koper, who is also a scriptwriter and artist. Actor Gün Koper is his son.

== Theatre ==
=== As director ===
- Kırmızı Pazartesi : Gabriel García Márquez - Istanbul City Theatres - 2008
- Titanik Orkestrası : Hristo Boychev - Istanbul City Theatres - 2006
- Antigone : Sophocles - Istanbul City Theatres - 2005
- Kuş Operasyonu : Hristo Boychev - Istanbul City Theatres - 2002
- Deli Eder İnsanı Bu Dünya : Erkan Akın - 1998
- Oyunlarla Yaşayanlar : Oğuz Atay - Istanbul City Theatres - 1998
- Aslolan Hayattır : Nâzım Hikmet \ Macit Koper - Istanbul City Theatres - 1994
- Kadınlar Da Savaşı Yitirdi : Curzio Malaparte - 1992
- Bir Anarşistin Kaza Sonucu Ölümü : Dario Fo - Yeditepe Oyuncuları - 1991
- Meraklısı İçin Öylesine Bir Hikâye : Sait Faik Abasıyanık - Istanbul City Theatres - 1988
- İkili Oyun : Bilgesu Erenus - Dostlar Theatre - 1978
- Ortak : Bilgesu Erenus - Dostlar Theatre - 1976

=== As actor ===
- Cumhuriyet Kızı : Memet Baydur - Istanbul City Theatres
- Bitmeyen Kavga : John Steinbeck - Dostlar Theatre
- Ezenler Ezilenler Başkaldıranlar : Mehmet Akan - Dostlar Theatre
- Düşmanlar : Maxim Gorky - Dostlar Theatre
- Alpagut Olayı : Haşmet Zeybek - Dostlar Theatre
- Azizname : Aziz Nesin \ Genco Erkal - Dostlar Theatre
- Abdülcambaz : Turhan Selçuk - Dostlar Theatre
- Soruşturma : Peter Weiss - Dostlar Theatre
- Havana Duruşması : Hans Magnus Enzensberger - Dostlar Theatre
- Asiye Nasıl Kurtulur : Vasıf Öngören - Dostlar Theatre - 1985
- Galileo Galilei : Bertolt Brecht - Dostlar Theatre - 1983

== Filmography ==
=== As actor ===
==== Film ====
- Al Beni Baba - 2026
- Ayşe Tatile Çıktı - 2025
- Tur Rehberi - 2025
- Al Beni Baba - 2025
- İftarlık Gazoz - 2016
- İçimdeki İnsan - 2014
- Küçük Günahlar - 2010
- Melekler Evi - 2000
- Akrebin Yolculuğu - 1997
- Aşk Üzerine Söylenmemiş Her Şey - 1995
- Cazibe Hanımın Gündüz Düşleri - 1992
- Menekşe Koyu - 1991
- Melodram - 1988
- Ada - 1988
- Rumuz Goncagül - 1987
- Gece Yolculuğu - 1987
- Dolunay - 1987
- Afife Jale - 1987
- Değirmen - 1986
- Anayurt Oteli - 1986
- Bekçi - 1986
- Aaahh Belinda - 1986
- Hodja fra Pjort - 1985
- Adı Vasfiye - 1985
- Bir Yudum Sevgi - 1984
- Şekerpare - 1984
- Hakkâri'de Bir Mevsim - 1983
- At - 1981
- Düşman - 1979
- Köşeyi Dönen Adam - 1978

==== TV series ====
- Eşref Tek - 2026
- Doğanın Kanunu - 2026
- Kızılcık Şerbeti - 2025
- Eşref Rüya - 2025-2026
- Holding - 2024
- Bahar - 2024
- Ne Gemiler Yaktım - 2023
- Yaratılan - 2023
- Yargı - 2023
- O Kız - 2022–2023
- Hakim - 2022
- Baba - 2022
- Kağıt Ev - 2021
- Elkızı - 2020–2021
- Ramo - 2020
- Yüzleşme - 2019
- Masal Çiçeği - 2019
- Avlu - 2018
- Siyah Beyaz Aşk - 2018
- Hayat Sevince Güzel - 2016
- Poyraz Karayel - 2016
- Üç Arkadaş - 2014
- Muhteşem Yüzyıl - 2013
- Ağır Roman Yeni Dünya - 2012
- Al Yazmalım - 2011
- Havada Bulut - 2002
- Kurtuluş - 1994

=== As scriptwriter ===
- Yaralı Yürek - 2007
- Hasret - 2006
- Patroniçe - 2004
- Beş Kollu Avize - 2004
- Beybaba / Koltuk - 2003
- Şıh Senem - 2003
- Karşılaşma - 2002
- Canlı Hayat - 2000
- Baba - 1999
- Her şey Oğlum İçin - 1998
- Anlaşma Noktası - 1997
- Baba Evi - 1997
- Akrebin Yolculuğu - 1997
- Sen de Gitme Triandafilis - 1995
- Kız Kulesi Aşıkları / Hera ile Leandros - 1993
- Cazibe Hanımın Gündüz Düşleri - 1992
- Zıkkımın Kökü - 1992
- Deniz Gurbetçileri - 1991
- Kiraz Çiçek Açıyor - 1990
- Fotoğraflar - 1989
- İsa, Musa, Meryem - 1989
- Sevgiler Düşlerde Kaldı - 1989
- Kadın Dul Kalınca - 1988
- Bu Devrin Kadını - 1988
- Melodram - 1988
- Yedi Uyuyanlar - 1988
- Ada - 1988
- Çil Horoz - 1987
- Rumuz Goncagül - 1987
- Fikrimin İnce Gülü - Sarı Mercedes - 1987
- Zincir - 1987
- Bez Bebek - 1987
- Uzun Bir Gece - 1986
- Arzu - 1985
- Acı - 1984
- Fidan - 1984
- Seni Seviyorum - 1983

== Awards ==
Year	Award	Category
1984	21st Antalya Film Festival	Best Supporting Actor: Bir Yudum Sevgi
1993	5th Ankara Film Festival	Best Screenplay: Cazibe Hanımın Gündüz Düşleri
1997	9th Ankara Film Festival	Best Scriptwriter: Akrebin Yolculuğu
1992	29th Antalya Film Festival	Best Screenplay: Fikrimin İnce Gülü - Sarı Mercedes
2003	40th Antalya Film Festival	Best Screenplay: Karşılaşma
2003	25th SİYAD Turkish Cinema Awards	Best Screenplay: Karşılaşma
2009	Şişli Municipality Muhsin Ertuğrul Awards	Best Adaptation: Cronica de Una Muerte Anunciada
2014	46th Cinema Writers Association Awards	Honorary Award
