= Selma Gürbüz =

Turkish painter and sculptor (1960–2021)

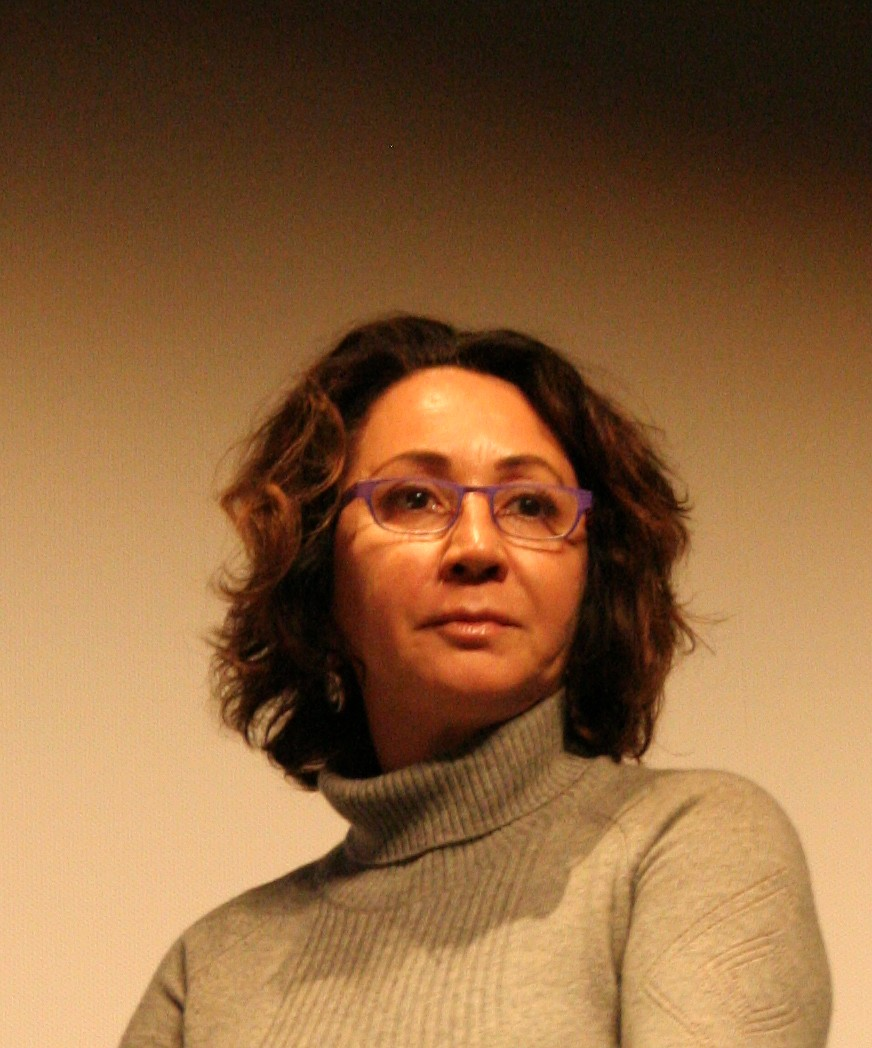
- Born: 1960; Istanbul, Turkey
- Died: 22 April 2021 (aged 60–61); Istanbul, Turkey
- Education: Marmara University, Faculty of Fine Arts; Exeter College of Art and Design
- Known for: painting, sculpting

Selma Gürbüz (1960 – 22 April 2021) was a Turkish painter and sculptor.

== Biography ==
Gürbüz was born in Istanbul in 1960. She studied painting, photography and theatre at Exeter College of Art and Design in England in 1978, and continued with her studies there in painting and sculpture from 1980 to 1982. She graduated from Marmara University, Faculty of Fine Arts, Department of Painting in 1984, and held her first solo exhibition in Istanbul in 1986.

She was one of Turkey's leading contemporary artists and her works appear in the collections of the British Museum in London, the Fondation Maeght in Paris, SantralIstanbul, İstanbul Modern, Proje 4L and Bilgi University in Istanbul, and in the State Art and Sculpture Museum in Ankara. She also held exhibitions in Paris, Rome, Barcelona and Buenos Aires.

Aside from her paintings, Gürbüz produced sculptures, weaving and engravings. She also worked as the artistic director of Ömer Kavur's films Akrebin Yolculuğu (The Scorpion's Journey, 1997) and Karşılash (The Encounter, 2002).

Gürbüz ranked 425th in Artprice's list of the top 500 best-selling contemporary artists in the world in 2016.

Having survived three years of treatment for cancer, Gürbüz died of COVID-19 in Istanbul, on 22 April 2021, at the age of 61.

== Books about Gürbüz ==
Publications about the artist and her work include Selma Gürbüz: Shadows of My Self, edited by Rose Issa and published in London, 2011; a guidebook named Three Writings for Selma Gürbüz written by Ferit Edgü and published in 2013; and her own monograph Dünya Diye Bir Yer (This Place We Call world), which was published by Istanbul Modern in 2021 to coincide with her solo show at the Istanbul Modern which was still showing when she died.
