= The MEB's 100 Fundamental Works (secondary schools) =

The MEB's 100 Fundamental Works (secondary schools) was a list of literary works compiled by the Ministry of National Education under the 59th government of Turkey. The works were recommended for use in secondary schools in connection with the Turkish language and literature curriculum and as supplementary reading for students. The list was announced in a circular issued by Minister of National Education Hüseyin Çelik on 19 August 2004. The circular also stated that a similar list would be prepared for primary schools.

The works were divided into the categories of Turkish literature and world literature. To avoid controversy, works by living authors were not included in the Turkish literature category.

== Changes to the list ==
Yusuf Atılgan's novel Anayurt Oteli was removed from the list by a ministry circular issued on 29 April 2008 and replaced by Tarık Buğra's novel Osmancık.

== Books ==
The list of works prepared to be taught in secondary schools and announced to the public is as follows:

=== Novels ===
1. Hunger (Knut Hamsun)
2. Aganta Burina Burinata (Halikarnas Balıkçısı)
3. Mediterranean (Panait Istrati)
4. Anayurt Oteli (Yusuf Atılgan) — removed from the list in 2008
5. Ayaşlı ile Kiracıları (Memduh Şevket Esendal)
6. Fathers and Sons (Ivan Turgenev)
7. White Fang (Jack London)
8. The White Ship (Chinghiz Aitmatov)
9. Bir Bilim Adamının Romanı (Oğuz Atay)
10. Cemo (Kemal Bilbaşar)
11. Çalıkuşu (Reşat Nuri Güntekin)
12. For Whom the Bell Tolls (Ernest Hemingway)
13. Death and the Dervish (Meša Selimović)
14. Dokuzuncu Hariciye Koğuşu (Peyami Safa)
15. Don Quixote (Miguel de Cervantes)
16. The Bridge on the Drina (Ivo Andrić)
17. Drina'da Son Gün (Faik Baysal)
18. Esir Şehrin İnsanları (Kemal Tahir)
19. Eskici ve Oğulları (Orhan Kemal)
20. Of Mice and Men (John Steinbeck)
21. Fatih-Harbiye (Peyami Safa)
22. Gora (Rabindranath Tagore)
23. The Day Lasts More Than a Hundred Years (Chinghiz Aitmatov)
24. İbrahim Efendi Konağı (Samiha Ayverdi)
25. A Tale of Two Cities (Charles Dickens)
26. Kalpaklılar (Samim Kocagöz)
27. Kaplumbağalar (Fakir Baykurt)
28. Karartma Geceleri (Rıfat Ilgaz)
29. Kayıp Aranıyor (Sait Faik Abasıyanık)
30. Kiralık Konak (Yakup Kadri Karaosmanoğlu)
31. Kuyruklu Yıldız Altında Bir İzdivaç (Hüseyin Rahmi Gürpınar)
32. Kuyucaklı Yusuf (Sabahattin Ali)
33. Küçük Ağa (Tarık Buğra)
34. Madame Bovary (Gustave Flaubert)
35. Mai ve Siyah (Halit Ziya Uşaklıgil)
36. Mor Salkımlı Ev (Halide Edib Adıvar)
37. Onlar da İnsandı (Cengiz Dağcı)
38. Osmancık (Tarık Buğra) — added in 2008 to replace Anayurt Oteli
39. Dead Souls (Gogol)
40. Robinson Crusoe (Daniel Defoe)
41. Sahnenin Dışındakiler (Ahmet Hamdi Tanpınar)
42. War and Peace (Tolstoy)
43. Les Misérables (Victor Hugo)
44. Sergüzeşt (Samipaşazade Sezai)
45. The Sound and the Fury (William Faulkner)
46. The Clown and His Daughter (Halide Edib Adıvar)
47. Sokakta (Bahaeddin Özkişi)
48. Crime and Punishment (Fyodor Dostoyevsky)
49. Tütün Zamanı (Necati Cumalı)
50. Le Lys dans la vallée (Balzac)
51. Yaban (Yakup Kadri Karaosmanoğlu)
52. Yaşar Ne Yaşar Ne Yaşamaz (Aziz Nesin)
53. Yedinci Gün (Orhan Hançerlioğlu)
54. Yılkı Atı (Abbas Sayar)

=== Speech ===
1. Nutuk (Mustafa Kemal Atatürk)

=== Play ===
1. Faust (Goethe)

=== Short stories ===
1. Çağlayanlar (Ahmet Hikmet Müftüoğlu)
2. Book of Dede Korkut (anonymous)
3. Gazoz Ağacı (Sabahattin Kudret Aksal)
4. Gurbet Hikâyeleri (Refik Halit Karay)
5. Gülistan (Saadi)
6. Ömer Seyfettin Hikâyelerinden Seçmeler (Ömer Seyfettin)
7. Haldun Taner Hikâyelerinden Seçmeler (Haldun Taner)
8. Sait FaiK Abasıyanık Hikâyelerinden Seçmeler (Sait Faik Abasıyanık)
9. Kelile ve Dimne (Beydeba)
10. Kerem ile Aslı (anonymous)
11. Memleket Hikâyeleri (Refik Halit Karay)

=== Poetry ===
1. Orhan Veli Kanık'ın Bütün Şiirleri
2. Çile (Necip Fazıl Kısakürek)
3. Divan Şiirinden Seçmeler (various poets)
4. Dostlar Beni Hatırlasın (Âşık Veysel)
5. Halk Şiirinden Seçmeler (various poets)
6. Han Duvarları (Faruk Nafiz Çamlıbel)
7. Kendi Gök Kubbemiz (Yahya Kemal Beyatlı)
8. Kutadgu Bilig'den Seçmeler (various poets)
9. Memleketimden İnsan Manzaraları (Nâzım Hikmet)
10. Mesnevi'den Seçmeler (Mevlânâ)
11. Otuz Beş Yaş (Cahit Sıtkı Tarancı)
12. Safahat (Mehmet Âkif Ersoy)
13. Ahmet Muhip Dıranas Şiirlerinden Seçmeler (Ahmet Muhip Dıranas)
14. Ahmet Kutsi Tecer Şiirlerinden Seçmeler (Ahmet Muhip Dıranas)
15. Yunus Emre Divanı'ndan Seçmeler (Yunus Emre)

=== Essay ===
1. Beş Şehir (Ahmet Hamdi Tanpınar)
2. Bize Göre (Ahmet Haşim)
3. Boğaziçi Mehtapları (Abdülhak Şinasi Hisar)
4. Boğaziçi Şıngır Mıngır (Salah Birsel)
5. Bu Ülke (Cemil Meriç)
6. Republic (Plato)
7. Diyorlar Ki (Ruşen Eşref Ünaydın)
8. Eğil Dağlar (Yahya Kemal Beyatlı)
9. Gençlerle Başbaşa (Ord. Prof. Dr. Ali Fuat Başgil)
10. Apology of Socrates (Plato)
11. Şehir Mektupları (Ahmet Rasim)
12. Türkçenin Sırları (Nihad Sami Banarlı)

=== Travel writing ===
1. Anadolu Notları (Reşat Nuri Güntekin)
2. Seyahatnâme (Evliya Çelebi)

=== Memoir ===
1. Çankaya (Falih Rıfkı Atay)
2. Zeytindağı (Falih Rıfkı Atay)

=== Autobiography ===
1. Suyu Arayan Adam (Şevket Süreyya Aydemir)

=== Anecdotes ===
1. Nasreddin Hoca Fıkralarından Seçmeler (Nasreddin Hodja)

=== Tales ===
1. Türk Masalları (Naki Tezel)
