= Şalvar Davası =

- Directed by: Kartal Tibet
- Written by: Basar Sabuncu
- Starring: Müjde Ar and Şener Şen
- Music by: Atilla Özdemiroğlu
- Release date: November 1983
- Running time: 90 minutes
- Country: Turkey
- Language: Turkish

Şalvar Davası (English: The Case of the Baggy Pants) is a 1983 Turkish film directed by Kartal Tibet and starring Müjde Ar and Şener Şen. The film, a loose adaptation of the ancient Greek play Lysistrata by Aristophanes, was the first starring role for Şen.

== Cast ==
- Müjde Ar as Elif
- Sener Sen as Ömer Aga
- Halil Ergün as Recep
- Ihsan Yüce as Halil Emmi
- Tuncay Akça as Osman
- Sevil Ustekin as Hatice
- Pembe Mutlu

== Plot ==
Elif returns to her native village after her husband dies. When she comes back, she finds that nothing has changed. The village men still make their wives work hard while they sit in the cafes and gossip. Elif inspires the women to fight back against this unfair treatment, and they vow not to have sex with their husbands until they start working. Meanwhile, Elif clashes with her old flame Ömer Aga.
