= Müjde Ar =

Turkish actress (born 1954)

- Born: Kamile Suat Ebrem; 21 June 1954 (age 72); Istanbul, Turkey
- Education: Istanbul University
- Occupation: Actress
- Years active: 1974–present
- Spouse: Ercan Karakaş (m. 2005)
- Parent(s): Vedat Ebrem (Akın); Aysel Gürel
- Relatives: Mehtap Ar (sister)

Kamile Suat Ebrem (born 21 June 1954), better known as Müjde Ar, is a Turkish film actress.

== Biography ==
She is the oldest daughter of the dramaturge and song writer Aysel Gürel. She left school at the age of 20, while she was pursuing a German Language and Literature M.A. at the Istanbul University. At the age of 21, she married TV director Samim Değer and started to work as a model before taking part in Turkish B movies. After making about 100 B films & family comedy films between early 70s and early 1980s, her breakthrough came with the 1984 Yavuz Turgul film Fahriye Abla (Sister Fahriye). Fahriye Abla was the screen adaptation of Ahmed Muhip Dranas' poem of the same name.

Her portrayal of modern, sensual, independent, rebel woman in her films after Fahriye Abla won the hearts of Turkish filmgoers. It was considered a revolution in the relatively conservative mainstream Turkish cinema at that time, when females played mostly second fiddle roles. Mujde Ar then became the cult object of women cinema and the lead of many films by renowned Turkish directors Atıf Yılmaz, Halit Refiğ, Başar Sabuncu, Ertem Eğilmez. Her filmography includes Tosun Paşa, Gülen Gözler, Kibar Feyzo, Şalvar Davası, Dul Bir Kadın, Dağınık Yatak, Adı Vasfiye, Asiye Nasıl Kurtulur, Asılacak Kadın, Teyzem, Karşılaşma.

In 2000s, Remakes of her films Aşk-ı Memnu, "Ah Belinda", "İffet", "Ağır Roman" sold internationally. She played in series "Şahsiyet" which won at International Emmy Awards.

Müjde Ar has received several major Turkish cinema awards, such as the Golden Orange in Antalya Film Festival and the Turkish Cinema Critics Association Best Actress Award. She has recently come into the public spotlight. Müjde Ar was the opening night presenter of Ankara Flying Broom Women's Film Festival in May 2005. She was reported recently to be working on a new film project to act along with Turkish pop music diva Sezen Aksu. This project seems to be frozen for the time being, however.

Through the late 1970s, she was the girlfriend of director Ertem Eğilmez. In 1980, she started her relationship with composer Atilla Özdemiroğlu that would last until 1995. Müjde Ar married politician Ercan Karakaş in 2005.

== Theater ==
- Varyemez (Cimri)
- Aç Koynunu Ben Geldim

== Films ==
- Bozkırda Deniz Kabuğu (2009) - Salur Hoca
- Kilit (2007) - Afife Jale
- Eğreti Gelin (2004) - İffet
- Komser Şekspir (2000) - Deniz
- Dar Alanda Kısa Paslaşmalar (2000) - Aynur
- Ağır Roman (1997) - Tina
- Yolcu (1994) - Wife of Chef
- Aşk Filmlerinin Unutulmaz Yönetmeni (1990) - minor role
- Arabesk (1988) - Müjde
- Kaçamak (1987) - Suna
- Afife Jale (1987) - Afife Jale
- Aaahh Belinda (1986) - Serap
- Asiye Nasıl Kurtulur (1986) - Asiye
- Kupa Kızı (1986) - Nilgün
- Asılacak Kadın (1986) - Melek
- Teyzem (1986) - Üftade
- Dul Bir Kadın (1985) - Suna
- Adı Vasfiye (1985) - Vasfiye
- Çıplak Vatandaş (1985) - Artist
- Fahriye Abla (1984) - Fahriye
- Gizli Duygular (1984) - Ayşen
- Dağınık Yatak (1984) - Benli Meryem
- Şalvar Davası (1983) - Elif
- Güneşin Tutulduğu Gün (1983) - Sevgi
- Aile Kadını (1983) - Pınar
- Göl (1982) - Nalan
- İffet (1982) - İffet
- Ah Güzel İstanbul (1981) - Cevahir
- Deli Kan (1981) - Zekiye
- Feryada Gücüm Yok (1981) - Müge
- Çirkinler De Sever (1981) - Müjde
- La Mondana Nuda (1980) - Mary Ar
- Kır Gönlünün Zincirini (1980)- Ebru
- Aşkı Ben Mi Yarattım (1979) - Mehtap
- Şahit (1978)
- Güneşten de Sıcak (1978) - Arzu
- Kaybolan Yıllar (1978) - Çiğdem
- Töre (1978) - Zeynep
- Uyanış (1978) - Suzan
- Kibar Feyzo (1978) - Gülo
- Sarmaş Dolaş (1977) - Mine
- Vahşi Sevgili (1977) - Fadime
- Lanet / İlenç (1977) - Sibel
- Nehir (1977) - Hümeyra
- Günahın Bedeli / Tokat (1977) - Banu
- Kızını Dövmeyen Dizini Döver (1977) - Sevil
- Gülen Gözler (1977) - İsmet
- Tatlı Kaçık (1977) - Gül
- Deli Gibi Sevdim (1976) - Zeynep
- Selam Dostum (1976) - Ayşe
- Taşra Kızı (1976) - Macide
- Mağlup Edilemeyenler (1976) - Aysel
- Öyle Olsun (1976) - Alev
- Adalı Kız (1976) - Eda
- Gel Barışalım (1976) - Ümran
- Tosun Paşa (1976) - Leyla
- Köçek (1975) - Caniko
- Babacan (1975) - Ebru
- Baldız (1975) - Naciye Arnamus
- Batsın Bu Dünya (1975) - Seher
- Pisi Pisi (1975) - Ayşin
- Sayılı Kabadayılar (1974) - Sanem

== Series ==
- Şahsiyet (2018)
- Aşk Ekmek Hayaller (2013)
- Benim Annem Bir Melek (2009) - Müjde Ar
- Kuşdili (2006) - Asiye
- Ayın Yıldızı (2006) - Asiye
- Serseri Aşıklar (2003) - Nevin
- Alacakaranlık (2003) - Nermin
- Karakolda Ayna Var (2000) - Cemile
- Aşk-ı Memnu (1975) - Bihter

Awards
Preceded by Zuhal Olcay	Golden Orange Award for Best Actress; 1986 for Aaahh Belinda-Adı Vasfiye	Succeeded by Türkan Şoray
Preceded by Lale Mansur	Golden Orange Award for Best Actress; 1993 for Yolcu	Succeeded by Türkan Şoray
