= Serra Yılmaz =

Turkish actress

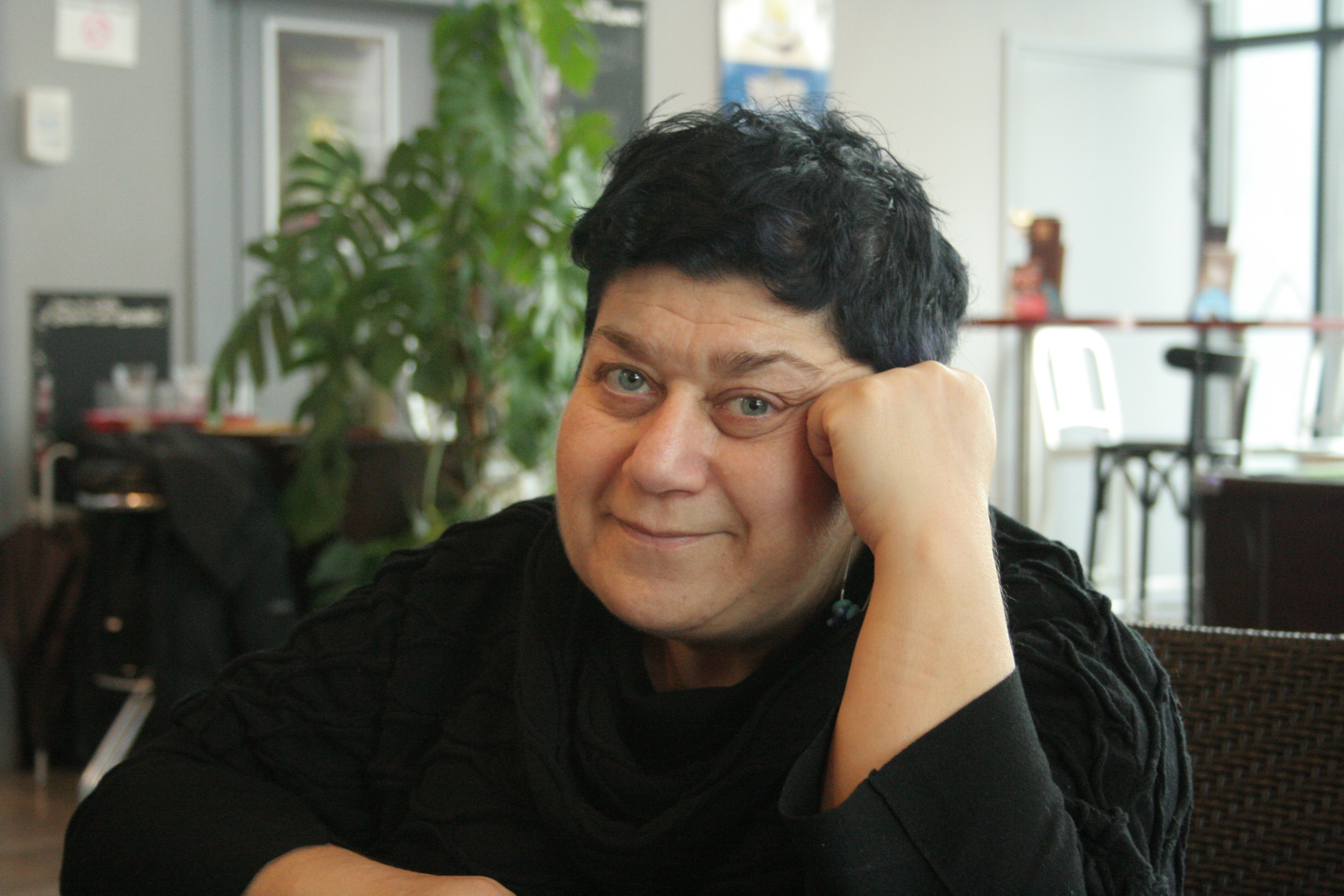
- Born: 13 September 1954 (age 71); Istanbul, Turkey
- Occupation: Actress
- Years active: 1983–present
- Spouse: Levent Yılmaz (m. 1977; div. 1987)
- Children: 1

Serra Yılmaz (born 13 September 1954) is a Turkish actress. She has appeared in more than forty films since 1983. On a number of films she collaborated with Ferzan Özpetek.

She plays the lead role in the theatre piece La Bastarda Di Istanbul, adapted from Elif Şafak's 2006 novel The Bastard of Istanbul and staged in March 2015 by Teatro di Rifredi in Florence, Italy.

In an interview, Yılmaz said that she was an atheist. In 1991, she was diagnosed with breast cancer and received treatment.

== Filmography ==
=== Film ===
Year	Title	Role	Notes
1983	Şekerpare	Mahmure	
1983	Seni Seviyorum	Belkis	
1984	A Sip of Love	Hayriye	
1986	Teyzem	Senay	
1987	Afife Jale	Saziye	
1987	Motherland Hotel	Zeynep	
1990	Karılar Koğuşu	Arsanuzlu Safiye	
1994	Tersine Dünya	Meryem	
1999	Harem Suare	Gülfidan	
2000	The Raindrop	Ayse	
2001	Summer Love	Sefika	
2001	The Ignorant Fairies	Serra	
2003	Facing Windows	Eminè	
2004	Vanilla and Chocolate	Diomira	
2007	Saturn in Opposition	Neval	
2007	The Secret of Rahil	Psychologist	Cameo appearance
2008	A Perfect Day	Ice cream seller	Cameo appearance
2009	Vavien	Vekil	
2010	Scontro di civiltà per un ascensore a Piazza Vittorio	Nurit	
2010	The Voice	Cahide	
2011	Beur sur la ville	Nurse	Cameo appearance
2011	Losers' Club	Mother	
2014	Eyyvah Eyvah 3	Mercedes	
2015	Heat Wave	Josiane Bousou	
2015	Toz Bezi	Ayten	
2016	Tommaso	Alberta	
2017	Red Istanbul	Sibel	
2018	La prima pietra	Fatima Habal	
2019	The Goddess of Fortune	Esra	
2020	Divine	Taxi driver #1	Cameo appearance
2023	Istanbul Trilogy: Meze	Mualla	
2023	Elemental	Cinder Lumen (voice)	Italian dub; voice role
2024	Amiche mai	Aysé	
2025	Even	Myriam	

=== Television ===
Year	Title	Role	Notes
2005	Ricomincio da me	Sandra	Episode: "Episode One"
2006	E poi c'è Filippo	Maritza	Main role
2007–2008	Parmaklıklar Ardında	Hayriye	Recurring role
2012	One Thousand and One Nights: Aladino and Sherazade	Shirin	Television movie
2022	The Ignorant Angels	Serra	Main role
2023	Sono Lillo	Tigre	Episode: "8"
