= List of songs with lyrics by Aysel Gürel =

This list contains song lyrics written by Turkish lyricist Aysel Gürel.

Song	Composer	Performer - Album (Year)	References
Ah Mazi	Onno Tunç	Sezen Aksu - Git (1986)	
Allahaısmarladık	Baha Boduroğlu	Sezen Aksu - Allahaısmarladık (1977)	
Ben Her Bahar Aşık Olurum	Selmi Andak	Sezen Aksu - Ağlamak Güzeldir (1981)	
Bırak Beni	Sezen Aksu, Onno Tunç	Sezen Aksu - Sezen Aksu Söylüyor (1989)	
Bindokuzyüzkırkbeş	Onno Tunç	Sezen Aksu - Sen Ağlama (1984)	
Bir Başka Aşk	Onno Tunç	Sezen Aksu - Sen Ağlama (1984)	
Bu Sevda Bu Şehre Sığmaz	Sezen Aksu	Ferdi Özbeğen - Ayrılmayalım (2001)	
Değer mi?	Onno Tunç	Sezen Aksu - Git (1986)	
Değer mi?	Onno Tunç	Sezen Aksu - Gülümse (1991)	
Dümtek	Sezen Aksu	Sezen Aksu - Firuze (1982)	
En Uzun Gece	Atilla Özdemiroğlu	Sezen Aksu - Ağlamak Güzeldir (1981)	
Gelmeyeceğim	Sezen Aksu	Ayşegül Aldinç - Sorma (1991)	
Gelmeyeceğim	Sezen Aksu	İsmail Hazar - Sensiz Saatler (1993)	
Günah Gibi	Sezen Aksu, Onno Tunç	Gönül Akkor - Dönüş (1994)	
Hadi Bakalım	Onno Tunç	Sezen Aksu - Gülümse (1991)	
Hani	Recep Aktuğ	Sezen Aksu - Sevgilerimle (1980)	
Hasret	Atilla Özdemiroğlu	Sezen Aksu - Sezen Aksu`88 (1988)	
Haydi Gel Benimle Ol	Onno Tunç	Sezen Aksu - Sen Ağlama (1984)	
Hoşgörü	Onno Tunç	Sezen Aksu - Ağlamak Güzeldir (1981)	
İstanbul Hatırası	Arto Tunçboyaciyan	Sezen Aksu - Sezen Aksu Söylüyor (1989)	
Lunapark	Atilla Özdemiroğlu	Sezen Aksu - Ağlamak Güzeldir (1981)	
Ne Kavgam Bitti Ne Sevdam	Onno Tunç	Sezen Aksu - Gülümse (1991)	
O Kadın	Sezen Aksu	Sezen Aksu - Çınar Vol. 1 (2008)	
O-kudum-da	Arto Tunçboyaciyan	Sezen Aksu - Deliveren (2000)	
Sarhoş Olunca Anılar	Sezen Aksu	Ferdi Özbeğen - Can Suyum (2006)	
Sarhoş Olunca Anılar	Sezen Aksu	Ferdi Özbeğen - Seviyorum Delicesine (1983)	
Sarışın	Ara Dinkjian	Sezen Aksu - Sezen Aksu`88 (1988)	
Sır	Fahir Atakoğlu	Sezen Aksu - Aysel'in (2013)	
Son Bakış	Onno Tunç	Sezen Aksu - Sezen Aksu Söylüyor (1989)	
Sonbahar	Onno Tunç	Sezen Aksu - Git (1986)	
Söyle Kimsin?	Baha Boduroğlu	Sezen Aksu - Allahaısmarladık (1977)	
Sultan Süleyman	Onno Tunç	Sezen Aksu - Sezen Aksu`88 (1988)	
Sürgün	Zülfü Livaneli	Sezen Aksu, Zülfü Livaneli - Gökyüzü Herkesindir (1987)	
Şarkılı Kahvenin Şarkıcısı	Sezen Aksu, Recep Aktuğ	Selçuk Ural - Sevdalıyım (1982)	
Şöyle Yürekli Bir Sevda	Sezen Aksu	Sezen Aksu - Firuze (1982)	
Ünzile	Onno Tunç	Sezen Aksu - Git (1986)	
Ünzile	Onno Tunç	Sezen Aksu - Kardelen (2005)	
Yalnızca Sitem	Onno Tunç	Sezen Aksu - Git (1986)	
Yine Yeni Yeniden	Onno Tunç	Sezen Aksu - Onno Tunç Şarkıları (2007)	
Yolun Başı	Sertab Erener	Sertab Erener - Sertab Erener (1999)	
