= Flying Broom International Women's Film Festival =

Coordinates: 39°55′48″N 32°51′00″E

The Flying Broom International Women's Film Festival is an annual Ankara-based film festival celebrating women's contributions to filmmaking.

Established by Halime Güner in 1997 in order to raise awareness and fight for women's human rights, it has been organized by the women's empowerment organization Flying Broom.

The Flying Broom Women's Film Festival team is headed by Ayşegül Oğuz and Didem Baltacı. Other members of the festival's team are Sibel Astarcıoğlu, and Uğur and Ürün Güner. The festival gives out the Bilge Olgaç Honorary Award and the Lifelong Achievement Award. It is the only women's film festival in the world to give out the International Film Critics Federation (Fipresci) Award.

In 2023, the festival devoted a section to feminist resistance and solidarity for women in Iran, and protest surrounding the death of Mahsa Amini.

In 2025, the film festival celebrated its 28th year.

== 2005 ==
The 2005 festival was held from the 5th to 12 May 2005. The opening night ceremony presenters were Müjde Ar and Mahir Günşiray. Sevda Ferdağ was presented the Lifelong Achievement Award by Müjde Ar, her co-star in Ağır Roman. Former Lifelong Achievement Award winners are Sezer Sezin (2003) and Suzan Avci (2004). The Bilge Olgaç Honorary Award was given to Jeyan Ayral Tözüm (film and stage actress) and Sevin Okyay (film critic, journalist, TV presenter, author and the Turkish translator of Harry Potter).

The theme of this year's festival was love. Greta Garbo was remembered with a special section on her centennial birthday. The nominees for the Fipresci Award included very popular films like Sally Potter's Yes, Mania Akbari's 20 Fingers, Keren Yedeya's Or, Lucile Hadzihalilovich's Innocence, and Agnès Jaoui's Look at Me. The winner of the Fipresci Award was To Take a Wife by Ronit and Schlomi Elkabitz of Israel.

== See also ==
- List of women's film festivals
- Women's Cinema
