= Mehtap Ar =

Turkish actress (1956–2021)

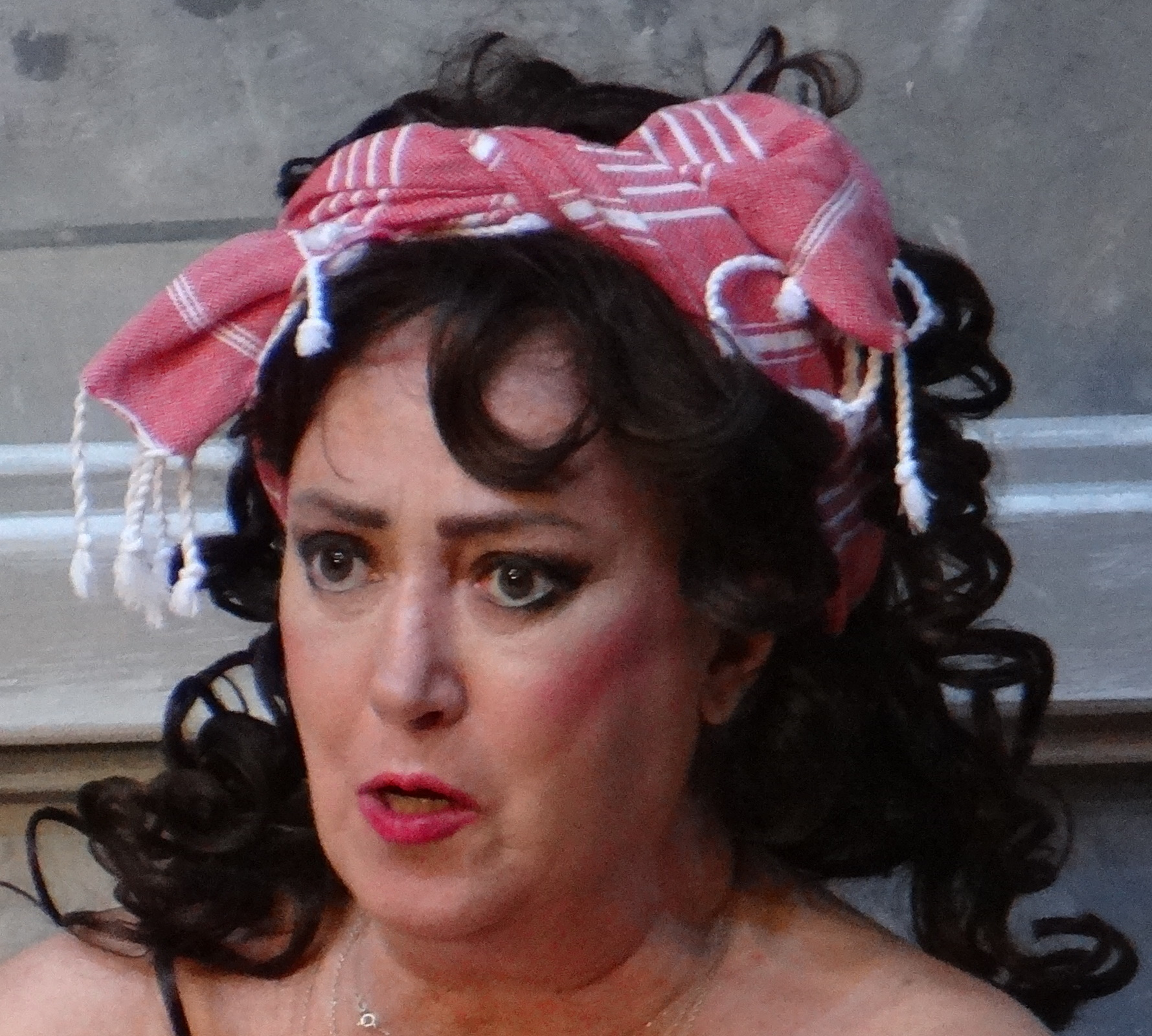
- Born: 6 April 1956; Istanbul, Turkey
- Died: 10 April 2021 (aged 65); Istanbul
- Resting place: Zincirlikuyu Cemetery
- Occupation: Actress
- Spouse: Arif Kocabıyık
- Children: 1
- Parent(s): Vedat Ebrem (Akın); Aysel Gürel
- Relatives: Müjde Ar (sister)

Mehtap Ar (6 April 1956 – 10 April 2021) was a Turkish actress who appeared in over 50 films and TV series.

She started acting at the Lale Oraloğlu theater. Later she continued acting in Nejat Uygur and Tevfik Gelenbe theaters. She began her cinema career with the 1974 film Ayrı Dünyalar. She also played in the 1980 film Devlet Kuşu. She has appeared in over 50 films and TV series.

Ar died at the Koç University Hospital in Istanbul on 10 April 2021, aged 64, from organ failure where she was treated for lung cancer. Two days later, she was buried at Zincirlikuyu Cemetery, next to her mother Aysel Gürel.
