= Flying Broom =

Women's empowerment organization in Turkey

The Flying Broom (Turkish: Uçan Süpürge) is a feminist organization in Turkey. Founded in 1996 in Ankara, the organization aims to raise consciousness for gender equality while providing information and training to empower women. Most recognized for its annual International Women's Film Festival, the Flying Broom has launched several projects in different areas within Turkish civil society. It was particularly influential in the 2005 amendment of the Turkish penal code, turning violent crimes against women into crimes against the victim itself rather than against crimes against property of the family or society.

Since 1998 Flying Broom has published the bimonthly magazine Uçan Haber ("Flying News"). The organization also prepared reports on the situation of women in Turkey for the U.N. Fourth World Conference on Women, 1995 in Beijing. Currently, the organization is lead coordinator of the EU funded Civil Society Dialogue project "Watch Your Shadow" (Gölge Meclis), which aims at increasing the participation of women in local politics.

== History ==
The Flying Broom (Turkish: Uçan Süpürge) is a feminist organization in Turkey. Founded 1996 in Ankara, the organization aims to raise consciousness for gender equality while providing information and training to empower women. The organization was founded by Halime Güner and two feminist academics Filiz Kardam and Yıldız Ecevit to revitalize the stalling Turkish feminist movement of the 1990s. They were supported in the beginning by a women's group from the Netherlands. The organization began as a not-for-profit, and then transformed into a Foundation in 2017.

== Activities ==
Most recognized for its annual International Women's Film Festival, the Flying Broom has launched several projects in different areas within Turkish civil society. It was particularly influential in the 2005 amendment of the Turkish penal code, turning violent crimes against women into crimes against the victim itself rather than against crimes against property of the family or society.

Since 1998 it has published the bimonthly magazine Uçan Haber ("Flying News").

The organization's projects include:

- Database of Women's organizations in Turkey
- Network of Local Women Reporters
- Women's Website Project
- Gender awareness program "Building bridges" (Köprüler Kuruyoruz)
- From paths to roads
- International Women's Film Festival
- Academic conferences at Ankara's Middle East Technical University
- Radio and television programs

The organization also prepared reports on the situation of women in Turkey for the U.N. Fourth World Conference on Women, 1995 in Beijing.

Currently, the organization is lead coordinator of the EU funded Civil Society Dialogue project "Watch Your Shadow" (Gölge Meclis), which aims at increasing the participation of women in local politics.
