= Uğur Polat =

Turkish actor (born 1961)

- Born: 4 September 1961 (age 65); Istanbul, Turkey
- Education: Mimar Sinan Fine Arts University; Anadolu University
- Occupation: Actor
- Years active: 1979–present

Uğur Polat (born 4 September 1961) is a Turkish actor.

== Early life and career ==
He graduated from theatre department of Mimar Sinan Fine Arts University. He was lecturer in Anadolu University. He joined the Ankara Art Theatre (Ankara Sanat Tiyatrosu). He has appeared in more than forty films. His first film was Mist in 1988 in which he played the role of Erol.

He had leading roles in hit series Yeditepe İstanbul, Sultan Makamı and comedy crime series Ulan İstanbul. He was cast in popular series such as "Yargı", "Kayıp Şehir", "Son", "Türkan", "Sıcak Saatler", "Kurtuluş".

== Filmography ==
Web series
Year	Title	Role	Notes
2018	Dip	Savaş Kurtuluş	
TV series
Year	Title	Role	Notes
1989	Cahide		
1991	Yıldızlar Gece Büyür		
1995	Sahte Dünyalar		
1996	Kurtuluş	Veli Bey	
1998	Sıcak Saatler	Kaptan	
2001	Yeditepe İstanbul	Ali	
2003	Sultan Makamı	Arif	
2004	İstanbul Şahidimdir	Sina Öz	
2005	Seher Vakti	Ali	
2007	Sinekli Bakkal	Peregrini	
2007	Tutsak	Adil	
2008	Beni Unutma	Recep	
2008	Aşk Yakar	Savcı Duran	
2009	Nefes	Yahya	
2010-2011	Türkan	Prof. Cihat Yemni	
2012	Son	Kudret	
2012	Kayıp Şehir	Ethem	
2014	Cinayet	Aslan Kocatepe	
2014	Ulan İstanbul	Kandemir Nevizade	
2016	Gecenin Kraliçesi	Aziz Alkan	Leading role
2017	Kayıtdışı	Ekrem Tanöz	
2021	Yargı	Yekta Tilmen	Leading role
2024	Deha	Iskender Karan	Leading role
Films
Year	Title	Role	Notes
1980	Yaşamak Bu Değil		
1981	Mutlu Ol Yeter		
1988	Sis	Erol	
1989	Cahide		
1990	Bütün Kapılar Kapalıydı	Ateş	
1991	Suyun Öte Yanı		
1992	Cazibe Hanımın Gündüz Düşleri	Kürşat	
1995	Bir Kadının Anatomisi	Metin	
1996	Bir Erkeğin Anatomisi	Taner	
1997	Kördüğüm		
1997	Nice Yıllardan Sonra	Vedat	
1999	Kimsecikler		
1999	Salkım Hanımın Taneleri	Levon	
2000	Filler ve Çimen		
2000	Dar Alanda Kısa Paslaşmalar	Cem	
2000	Çilekli Pasta	Onur	
2000	Ayna		
2000	Yıldız Tepe		
2000	Beni Unutma		
2001	O da Beni Seviyor	İbrahim	
2002	Karşılaşma	Sinan	
2002	Güz Sancısı		
2005	2 Süper Film Birden	Abdullah	
2006	Pars: Kiraz Operasyonu	Ertuğrul	
2007	Sis ve Gece	Sedat	
2007	Küçük Adımlar		
2007	Kayıp		
2007	Mavi Gözlü Dev	Tahsin Bey	
2008	Vali	Ömer	
2008	Devrim Arabaları	Sami	
2008	Ali'nin Sekiz Günü	Mehmet	
2010	Yahşi Batı	Brokebackli Buck Berry	
2010	Çakal	Fahrettin	
2011	Güzel Günler Göreceğiz	İNote	
2012	Jurnal	Short	
2013	Eve Dönüş: Sarıkamış 1915	Saci Bey	
2013	Benimle Oynar mısın	Fatih	
2013	Ummah - Unter Freunden	Khaled	
2015	Ertuğrul 1890	Mirliva Osman Paşa	
2015	Eksik		
2019	Soluk	Tamer	
2020	Aşk Tesadüfleri Sever 2	Niko	
2021	Anadolu Leoparı	Fikret	

== Theatre ==
- Çehov Makinası: Matei Vișniec - İstanbul Devlet Tiyatrosu - 2012
- Kredi Kartı-Vak'a aaaaa!: Cüneyt Çalışkur - İstanbul Devlet Tiyatrosu - 2010
- Vur Yağmala Yeniden: Mark Ravenhill - Tiyatro Dot
- Sansürcü: Anthony Neilson - Tiyatro Dot
- Ben Ruhi Bey Nasılım: Edip Cansever - İstanbul Devlet Tiyatrosu - 2001
- Patron: Tarık Buğra - İstanbul Devlet Tiyatrosu - 2000
- Kuvai Milliye: Nâzım Hikmet - İstanbul Devlet Tiyatrosu - 1999
- İçerdekiler: Melih Cevdet Anday - İstanbul Devlet Tiyatrosu - 1995
- Olmayan Kadın: Kenan Işık - İstanbul Devlet Tiyatrosu - 1994
- Hamlet: William Shakespeare - İstanbul Devlet Tiyatrosu - 1993
- Küçük Burjuvalar: Bertolt Brecht - İstanbul Devlet Tiyatrosu - 1992
- Oresteia: Aiskhylos - İstanbul Devlet Tiyatrosu - 1991
- Fırtına: William Shakespeare - İstanbul Devlet Tiyatrosu - 1991
- Dün Gece Yolda Giderken Çok Komik Bir Şey Oldu: Larry Gelbert\Bert Shevelove - İstanbul Devlet Tiyatrosu - 1990
- Ballar Balını Buldum (Yunus Emre): Nezihe Araz - İstanbul Devlet Tiyatrosu - 1989
- Odissinbad: Ksenya Kalogerapulu - İstanbul Devlet Tiyatrosu - 1988
- Altı Kişi Yazarını Arıyor: Luigi Pirandello - İstanbul Devlet Tiyatrosu - 1988
- Hoşu'nun Utancı: Şinasi Ekicioğlu - İstanbul Devlet Tiyatrosu - 1987
- Yedi Kocalı Hürmüz: Sadık Şendil - İstanbul Devlet Tiyatrosu - 1987
- Deli İbrahim: Turan Oflazoğlu - Adana Devlet Tiyatrosu - 1987
- Tohum ve Toprak: Orhan Asena - İstanbul Devlet Tiyatrosu - 1986
- Akvaryum (oyun): Aldo Nicolai - Ankara Devlet Tiyatrosu - 1986
- Düşüş (oyun): Nahid Sırrı Örik\Kemal Bekir - İstanbul Devlet Tiyatrosu - 1984
- Hikâye-i Mahmut Bedrettin: Mehmet Akan - Ankara Sanat Tiyatrosu - 1980
- Oyun Nasıl Oynanmalı: (Vasıf Öngören - Ankara Sanat Tiyatrosu - 1979
- Kafatası: Nâzım Hikmet - Ankara Sanat Tiyatrosu - 1979
- Ferhat ile Şirin: Nâzım Hikmet - Ankara Sanat Tiyatrosu - 1979

== Awards and nominations ==
Year	Title
1990	Ankara Film Festival, "Most promising actor" award, Bütün Kapılar Kapalıydı
1996	İsmet Küntay Theatre award
1999	Antalya Golden Orange Film Festival, "Best actor" award, Mrs. Salkım's Diamonds
2002	Afife Jale Theatre award, "Best actor" award, Ben Ruhi Bey Nasılım
2003	Orhon Murat Arıburnu award, "Best actor" award, The Encounter
