= Oh Olsun =

- Directed by: Ertem Eğilmez
- Starring: Tarık Akan; Hale Soygazi
- Release date: 1973
- Running time: 1h 23min
- Country: Turkey
- Language: Turkish

Oh Olsun is a 1973 Turkish comedy film directed by Ertem Eğilmez.

== Cast ==
- Tarık Akan - Ferit Haznedar
- Hale Soygazi - Alev
- Hulusi Kentmen - Fehmi Haznedar, Ferit's Father
- Kemal Sunal - Fazil
- Metin Akpınar - Doktor Metin
- Halit Akçatepe - Ferdi
- Münir Özkul - Burhan Usta, Alev's Father
- Adile Naşit - Ferit's Mother
