= Aaahh Belinda =

1986 Turkish film by Atıf Yılmaz

- Film poster
- Directed by: Atıf Yılmaz
- Written by: Barış Pirhasan
- Produced by: Cengiz Ergun
- Starring: Müjde Ar; Yılmaz Zafer; Macit Koper; Güzin Özipek
- Cinematography: Orhan Oğuz
- Edited by: Odak Film
- Music by: Onno Tunç
- Release date: 1986
- Running time: 100 minutes
- Country: Turkey
- Language: Turkish

Aaahh Belinda is a 1986 Turkish fantastic comedy film, directed by Atıf Yılmaz, featuring Müjde Ar as a young actress appearing in a TV-commercial for a shampoo, who finds herself transported into the role she plays. The film screened in a competition at the 23rd Antalya Golden Orange Film Festival, where it won Golden Oranges for Best Film, Best Director and Best Actress.

== Synopsis ==
Serap, a young actress with a strong, lively personality and a special dislike for middle-class family life, takes part in a TV commercial for a recently marketed shampoo, "Belinda". She plays the role of a typical housewife called Naciye. During one of the rehearsals, she suddenly finds that the stage has disappeared, the crew has vanished and all the elements of the script have become real. Now she is Naciye. Even worse, her family thinks that she is suffering from depression, while Serap desperately tries to prove otherwise.

== Cast ==
- Müjde Ar - Serap
- Yılmaz Zafer - Suat
- Macit Koper - Hulusi
- Güzin Özipek
- Füsun Demirel - Feride
- Tarık Papuççuoğlu
- Mehmet Akan
- Levend Yılmaz
- Fatoş Sezer
- Burçak Çerezcioğlu - little girl of the family
