= Zuhal Olcay =

Turkish actress and singer (born 1957)

- Born: Zuhal İşanç; 10 August 1957 (age 69); Üsküdar, Istanbul, Turkey
- Occupations: Actress, singer
- Years active: 1977–present
- Spouses: Selçuk Yöntem (m. 1976; div. 1979) Zafer Olcay (m. 1980; div. 1987) Haluk Bilginer (m. 1992; div. 2004)
- Children: 1

Zuhal Olcay (Turkish pronunciation: [zuˈhal olˈdʒaj]; born 10 August 1957) is a Turkish actress, singer and Actors Union president.

== Biography ==
Graduated from Ankara State Conservatory in 1976, she first started as a stage actress. She played in hit series Yeditepe İstanbul. Since 1983 she also started acting in films and became famous with films like "Amansız Yol", "Kurşun Ata Ata Biter", "Bir Avuç Gökyüzü", "Halkalı Köle", and "Dünden Sonra Yarından Önce". In 1989 with Evita musical, she began her singing career.

In 2018, she was sentenced to 10 months in prison for allegedly insulting Turkish President Recep Tayyip Erdoğan. She had reportedly revised the lyrics to the song "Boş Vermişim Dünyayı" (I Let Go of the World), to say "Recep Tayyip Erdoğan, it's all empty, it's all a lie, life will end one day and you'll say 'I had a dream.'" A lawsuit was filed against her by the Istanbul Prosecutor's office for apparently insulting the president during a concert in 2016, seeking a four-year prison sentence.

Olcay was previously fined 10,620 lira ($2,708) for "insulting a public servant" in 2010.

She was elected as the president of Actors Union in 2024.

== Filmography ==
=== Film ===
- İhtiras Fırtınası (1983)
- Kurşun Ata Ata Biter (1985)
- Amansız Yol (1985)
- Genç ve Dul (1986)
- İstek (1986)
- Oteldeki Cinayet (1986)
- Halkalı Köle (1986)
- Dünden Sonra Yarından Önce (1987)
- Kara Sevdalı Bulut (1987)
- Bir Avuç Gökyüzü (1987)
- Bir Günah Gibi (1987)
- Gece Yolculuğu (1987)
- Sahte Cennete Veda / Aidu Au Faux Paradis (1988)
- Medcezir Manzaraları (1989)
- Gizli Yüz (1990)
- İki Kadın (1992)
- Ay Vakti (1993)
- Bir Sonbahar Hikayesi (1994)
- Aşk Üzerine Söylenmemiş Herşey (1995)
- 80. Adım (1996)
- İstanbul Kanatlarımın Altında (1996)
- Salkım Hanımın Taneleri (1999)
- Hiçbiryerde (2001)
- Simbiyotik (2004)
- Ankara Cinayeti 2006)
- İyi Seneler (2007)
- Mevzuhal (2008)
- Güz Sancısı (2009)
- Aşk Tesadüfleri Sever 2 (2020)

=== TV series ===
- Sönmüş Ocak (1980)
- Parmak Damgası (1985)
- Varsayalım İsmail (1986)
- Gecenin Öteki Yüzü (1987)
- Ateşten Günler (1987)
- Baharın Bittiği Yer (1989)
- Artist Palas (1994)
- Medeni Haller (1997)
- Çatısız Kadınlar (1999)
- Yeditepe İstanbul (2001)
- Seni Çok Özledim (2005)
- Geniş Zamanlar (2007)
- Beni Unutma (2008)
- Arka Sokaklar (2010)
- Umut Yolcuları (2010)
- İffet (2011)
- Bir Aşk Hikayesi (2013)
- Urfalıyam Ezelden (2014)
- Yüksek Sosyete (2016)
- Alev Alev (2020)
- Gecenin Ucunda (2022-2023)
- Piyasa (2025)

== Discography ==
=== Solo albums ===
- Küçük Bir Öykü Bu (1989)
- İki Çift Laf (1990)
- Oyuncu (1993)
- İhanet (1998)
- Başucu Şarkıları (2001)
- Başucu Şarkıları 2 (2005)
- Aşk'ın Halleri (2009)
- Başucu Şarkıları 3 (2015)

=== Singles ===
- "Dünden Sonra Yarından Önce" (1987)
- "Sensiz" (with Emre Atabek) (2018)
- "Eyvallah" (with Hüsnü Arkan) (2020)
- "Aşkınla Her Şey Oldum" (with Tuna Kiremitçi) (2022)

=== Other albums ===
- Asansör Film Müzikleri / Kolektif (1999)
- Bülent Ortaçgil İçin Söylenmiş Bülent Ortaçgil Şarkıları (2000)
- Hiçbiryerde Film Müzikleri (2002)
- Metin Altıok Ağıtı (2003)
- Söz Vermiş Şarkılar (2004)
- 41 Kere Maşallah (2006)
- Nazım / Fazıl Say (2006)
- Pop 2006 (2006)
- Bulutsuzluk Özlemi 20 Yaşında (2007)
- Güldünya Şarkıları (2008)
- Mucize Nağmeler (2009)
- Buğra Uğur'la 30 Yıl (2009)
- 2020 Model (2020 Model: Murathan Mungan) (2020)

Awards
Preceded by Asuman Arsan	Golden Orange Award for Best Supporting Actress; 1984 for İhtiras Fırtınası	Succeeded by Keriman Ulusoy
Preceded by Hale Soygazi	Golden Orange Award for Best Actress; 1985 for Amansız Yol	Succeeded by Müjde Ar
Preceded by Adriana Altaras; Marianne Sägebrecht	German Film Prize for Best Actress; 1989 for Abschied vom falschen Paradies with Heidemarie Hatheyer, Ayse Romey and Dana Vávrová	Succeeded by Lena Stolze
Preceded by Sumru Yavrucuk	Golden Boll Award for Best Actress; 1993 for İki Kadın 1994 for Bir Sonbahar Hikayesi	Succeeded by Ayşegül Aldinç
