= Arabesk (film) =

- Directed by: Ertem Eğilmez
- Starring: Müjde Ar; Şener Şen; Uğur Yücel
- Release date: 1989
- Running time: 105 min
- Country: Turkey
- Language: Turkish

Arabesk is a 1989 Turkish dark comedy film directed by Ertem Eğilmez. The film was Eğilmez's last before his death and caused controversy in Turkey for its attacks on Turkish pseudo-intellectuals.

== Cast ==
- Şener Şen - Sener
- Müjde Ar - Müjde
- Uğur Yücel - Ekrem
- Necati Bilgiç - Kaya
