= Mist (1988 film) =

- Directed by: Zülfü Livaneli
- Starring: Uğur Polat; Asli Altan
- Release date: 5 April 1988
- Running time: 1h 45min
- Countries: Sweden; West Germany; Turkey
- Language: Turkish

Mist (Turkish: Sis) is a 1988 Swedish-German-Turkish drama film directed by Zülfü Livaneli.

== Cast ==
- Uğur Polat - Erol
- Asli Altan
- Sevtap Parman
- Rutkay Aziz - Ali Firat
- Kenan Pars
- Aytaç Yörükaslan
