= Ayla Algan =

Turkish actress and singer (1937–2024)

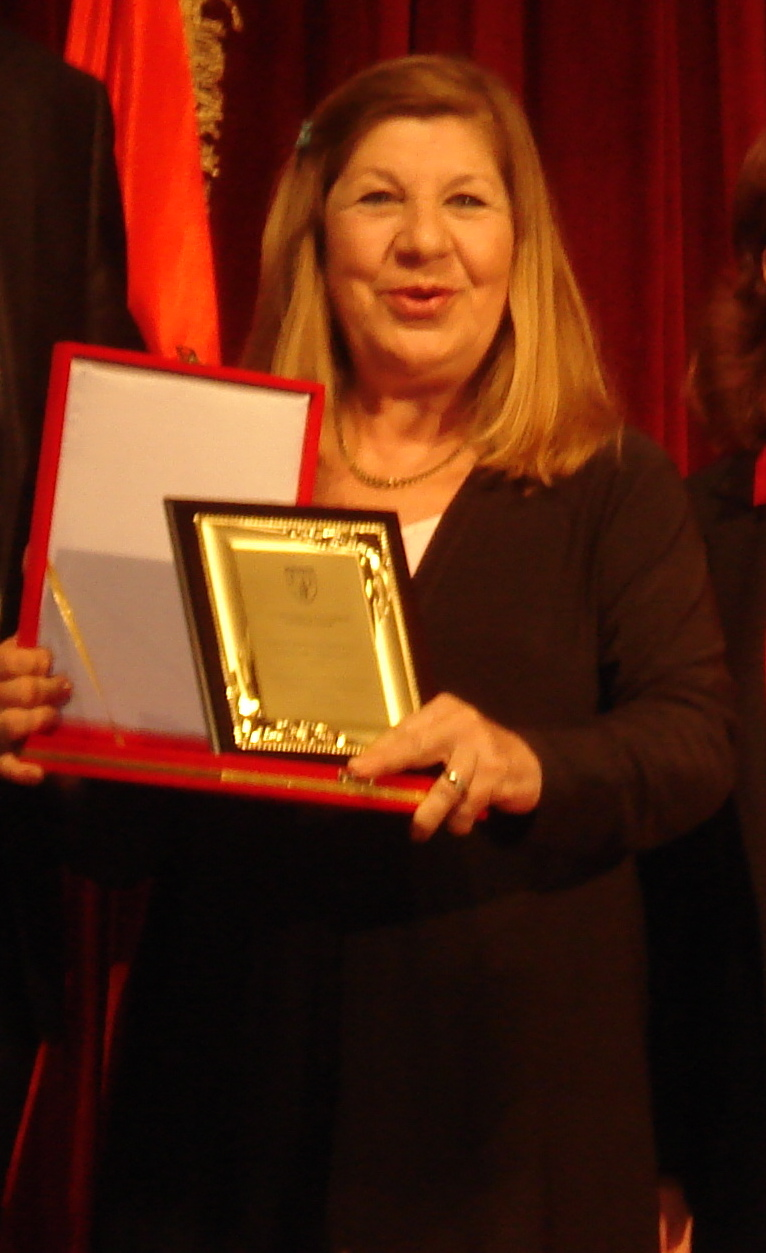
- Ayla Algan (2009)
- Born: Ayla Kasman; 29 October 1937; Istanbul, Turkey
- Died: 4 January 2024 (aged 86); Istanbul, Turkey
- Occupations: Actress, singer, musician, entertainer
- Years active: 1960–2024
- Spouse: Beklan Algan (m. 1957; died 2010)
- Children: 1
- Website: www.aylaalgan.com.tr

Ayla Algan (née Kasman; 29 October 1937 – 4 January 2024) was a Turkish film and stage actress and singer.

== Career ==
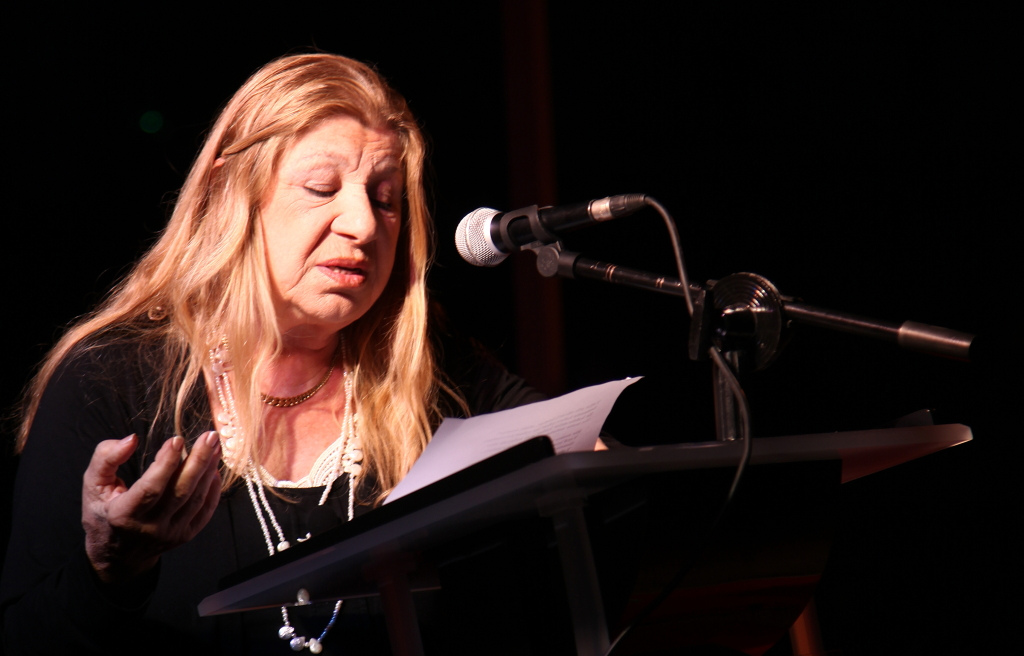
Ayla Algan in 2012

=== On stage ===
Algan appeared on the stage for the first time during her theatre education at the Actors Studio in New York City, United States.

In 1960, Muhsin Ertuğrul (1892–1979), then director of the Istanbul City Theatres, asked her to return to Turkey, offering her an actress cast. She debuted on the stage in Turkey acting in the drama Tarla Kuşu ("Skylark") in 1961. The same year, she played in Shakespeare's Hamlet.

She performed in French language in the lead roles of Dead Souls (1842) by Nikolai Gogol, Memleketimden İnsan Manzaraları ("Human Landscapes from My Country") (1966–67) by Nâzım Hikmet at the Théâtre national de Chaillot, of Orta Direk ("The Wind from the Plain") (1950) by Yaşar Kemal at Odéon-Théâtre de l'Europe in Paris, France.

In 1980, she moved to Berlin, Germany, where she played worker's theatre on stage four years long with her husband Beklan Algan and some other Turkish actors such as Tuncel Kurtiz, Şener Şen and Macit Koper. She performed in Giden Tez Geri Dönmez, Keşanlı Ali Destanı ("Epic of Ali from Keşan") (1964) by Haldun Taner, Talihli Amele, Kurban ve Keloğlan at the Schaubühne in Berlin, Germany.

She founded the "Thatre workshop BILSAK" together with her colleagues in 1984, and the "Theatre Research Laboratory TAL" in 1988. She developed many experimental projects and contributed to the training of new generation theatre actors, including performance artist Ares Kıvanç Dönmez. In 1996, she was appointed Deputy General Art Director at the Istanbul City Theatres.[3].

=== In film ===
Her first film was Karanlıkta Uyananlar ("Those Who Wake Up in the Dark"), an anti-American film shot in 1964. Due to big reaction, no cinema accepted to show the film. It resulted in bankruptcy. After many years, the film was aired on the television. She found a role in Ah Güzel İstanbul, shot in 1965.

=== In music ===
In 1971, Algan appeared on the stage of Olympia, the renowned concert venue in Paris. In 1972, she was honored with the second prize of the Bulgarian Golden Orpheus. The same year, she was named State Artist, and received UNICEF Honor Award. She won the X International Festival of Pop Song in Sopot 1977 in Poland with the song Kara Kartal ("Black Eagle").

=== As advisor ===
Algan had been providing "Corporate and Personal Development", "Communication", "Quality", "Motivation", "Act of Creation", etc. to the employees and senior managers of many institutions since 1989.

From 2010 on, she had been training young talents with "Creative and Contemporary Theatre Techniques" and "Commercial, TV Series and Cinema Acting" trainings at the Istanbul Drama Art Academy, where she had been working as the General Art Director, while continuing her theatre and cinema acting.

== Personal life ==
Ayla Algan, née Kasman, was born in Istanbul, Turkey on 29 October 1937. She completed her primary school at Yeni Kolej, the middle school at Lycée Notre Dame de Sion Istanbul in Turkey and the high school at Lycée Versailles in France.

She married Beklan Algan (1933–2010), later actor, writer and director, she met during her high school years. She has a daughter, Sevgi.

She followed her husband going to the United States. She started studying theatre together with her husband at the Actors Studio in New York City.

Later, she joined the Language and Culture Center (LCC) in Turkey, and worked as a theatre actress and instructor. After film and theatre, she started a singing career.

Algan died on 4 January 2024, at the age of 86, in a hospital in Istanbul, she was delivered due to intracerebral hemorrhage. She was interred at Aşiyan Asri Cemetery following a memorial ceremony at Harbiye Muhsin Ertuğrul Stage and the religious service at Teşvikiye Mosque.
