= Attila Özdemiroğlu =

- Born: 5 January 1943; Ankara, Turkey
- Died: 20 April 2016 (aged 73)
- Occupations: Musician, composer, arranger and music producer
- Instruments: Violin, flute, trombone, cello, viola, piano
- Years active: 1966–2016

Attila Özdemiroğlu (5 January 1943 – 20 April 2016) was a Turkish composer, arranger and music producer. He was best known for his award winning film scores in the 1970s and 1980s.

== Career ==
Born on 5 January 1943 in Ankara, Özdemiroğlu got interested in playing music already in his early years. At his age of eight, he took private lessons on violin. Learning to play many music instruments such as flute, vibraphone, double bass and trombone, he participated at music events during his high school and university years.

In 1966, he moved to Istanbul and joined the music band "Durul Gence 5". Later, Özdemiroğlu played in several other music groups and also for Turkish pop stars like Ajda Pekkan, Nilüfer, Kayahan and Sezen Aksu. One of his compositions, Pet'r Oil, was selected for Turkey's entry in the Eurovision Song Contest 1980, where he conducted the orchestra himself. Özdemiroğlu was awarded five times for his film scores at the Antalya Golden Orange Film Festival and twice at the Adana Golden Boll Film Festival.

Outside of his career as a musician, Attila was one of the co-founders of Anadolu.net the first Internet Service Provider in Turkey together with Riza Nur Pacalioglu and Tony Yustein.

== Personal life ==
Attila Özdemiroğlu married four times. He made his first marriage with Ayla at his age of 19. From this marriage that lasted eleven years, he has a daughter, Yaprak Özdemiroğlu, who became a film actress, and a son, Sarp Özdemiroğlu, who is also a composer and arranger. His marriage with Füsun Önal, a renowned pop singer, ended after only 1.5 years. He married then ballerina Lale Mansur, now film actress. After six years with her, he became an item with Müjde Ar, a famous film actress, which lasted 15 years. From 1995 until his death, he was married to Hepgül Hepbir. Attila Özdemiroğlu and his wife, who was 31 years his junior, had twin daughters, Lara and Lidya.

Özdemiroğlu died at age 73 on 20 April 2016 in Istanbul. He was suffering from lung cancer, and was hospitalized due to an injury resulting from a fall at home. He was interred in the Zincirlikuyu Cemetery following the religious service at Levent Mosque.

== Incidental music works ==
Özdemiroğlu created the following incidental music works:

Musical theatre

- Yedi Kocalı Hürmüz
- Beyoğlu, Beyoğlu (1984)
- Fosforlu Cevriye (2008)

Film

- Adı Vasfiye (1985)
- Züğürt Ağa (1985)
- Afife Jale (1987)
- Muhsin Bey (1987)
- Gece Yolculuğu (1988)
- Kaçamak (1988)
- Arabesk (1989)
- Aşk Filmlerinin Unutulmaz Yönetmeni (1990)
- Robert's Movie (1991)
- Akrebin Yolculuğu (1997)
- Ağır Roman (1997)
- Gönderilmemiş Mektuplar (2003)
- Kalbin Zamanı (2004)
- Kilit (2007)

== Turkey's selection for Eurovision Song Contest ==
His following songs were selected to contest for Turkey at the Eurovision Song Contest:

- 1975 Delisin by Cici Kızlar (third place in the selections)
- 1975 Minik Kuş by Füsun Önal (with Çiğdem Talu)
- 1975 Çiçekler by Zerrin Yaşar (with Zerrin Yaşar)
- 1978 İnsanız Biz by Grup Sekstet (second place in the selections - with Şanar Yurdatapan)
- 1980 Pet'r Oil by Ajda Pekkan (Turkey's entry - with Şanar Yurdatapan)
- 1983 Atlantis by Beş Yıl Önce, On Yıl Sonra (with Aysel Gürel)

Awards
Preceded by Yılmaz Duru	Golden Orange Award for Best Music Score with Şanar Yurdatapan; 1975 for Arkadaş	Succeeded by Melih Kibar
Preceded by Tarık Öcal	Golden Orange Award for Best Music Score; 1986 for Kurbağalar and Züğürt Ağa; 1987 for Muhsin Bey; 1988 for Gece Yolculuğu and Kaçamak	Succeeded by Selim Atakan
Preceded by Selim Atakan	Golden Orange Award for Best Music Score; 1990 for Aşk Filmlerinin Unutulmaz Yönetmeni	Succeeded by Cahit Berkay
Preceded by Can Hakgüder	Golden Boll Award for Best Music Score; 1997 for Akrebin Yolculuğu	Succeeded by not held
Preceded by not held	Golden Boll Award for Best Music Score; 2005 for Eğreti Gelin	Succeeded by Taner Onat; Serkan Sönmezocak
