= Şahika Tekand =

Turkish actress (born 14.06.1959)

- Born: 1959 (age 66–67)
- Occupation: Actress
- Years active: 1987–present

Şahika Tekand (born 1959) is a Turkish actress. She has appeared in more than fifteen films since 1987.

== Biography ==
Tekand graduated from the Fine Arts Faculty, Department of Theatre and Acting at the Dokuz Eylül University in 1984 and received her PhD in 1986.

== Selected filmography ==
Year	Title	Role	Notes
1986	Motherland Hotel		
1987	Night Journey		
1994	Yengeç Sepeti		
1997	Akrebin Yolculuğu		
