= Bir Sonbahar Hikayesi =

An Autumn Story (Bir Sonbahar Hikayesi) is a 1994 Turkish film directed by Yavuz Özkan. The plot focuses on the relations of a couple during the post-coup days of the 1980s. The film won the N.F. Eczacıbaşı Foundation Award for Best Turkish Film of the Year

== Cast ==
- Zuhal Olcay
- Nazan Kesal
- Can Togay
- Sinem Uretmen
