= Walking After Midnight (1992 film) =

- Directed by: Atıf Yılmaz
- Starring: Meral Oğuz; Lale Mansur
- Release date: 1992
- Running time: 1h 44min
- Country: Turkey
- Language: Turkish

Walking After Midnight (Turkish: Düş Gezginleri) is a 1992 Turkish drama film directed by Atıf Yılmaz.

== Cast ==
- Meral Oğuz - Nilgün
- Lale Mansur - Havva
- Yaman Okay - Nafiz
- Selçuk Özer - Faruk
- Sema Çeyrekbaşı - Sükran
- Memduh Ün - Ali
- Nilüfer Aydan - Hacer
- Deniz Türkali - Olay
