= Yaprak Özdemiroğlu =

Turkish actress, and ballet dancer (born 1963)

- Born: 14 August 1963 (age 62); Ankara
- Occupations: Actress, ballet
- Years active: 1981–2002
- Parent(s): Attila Özdemiroğlu; Ayla Özdemiroğlu

Yaprak Özdemiroğlu (born 14 August 1963) is a Turkish actress, and ballet dancer.

== Career ==
Daughter of Attila Özdemiroğlu, a film score composer and arranger, Özdemiroğlu was born in Ankara, the Turkish capital. She studied ballet technique at Turkish State Conservatory. She started her career with theatre acting.

In 1981, she moved to Istanbul and started acting at local movies and TV series.

== Personal life ==
On 9 September 2011, it has been featured on various local papers that Özdemiroğlu and Cem Yılmaz, a prominent Turkish writer and stand-up comedian, have been seen together during the concert of Jamiroquai. Yılmaz denied the rumours.

== Filmography ==
=== Movies ===
Year	Original Title	Alt. English Translation	Role	Notes
1981	Hababam Sınıfı Güle Güle	Hababam Grade Good Bye	Gamze	First Motion Picture
1981	Şöhretin Sonu	End of the Fame	Fiancée of Doğan	
1982	Dolap Beygiri	Wheel Horse	Ayşe	
1982	Alişan	Alişan	Aslı	
1983	Şekerpare	Sweetheart	Şekerpare	
1983	Beyaz Ölüm	The White Death	Emel	
1983	Feryat	The Howl		
1984	Dil Yarası	Wound of Speech	Hülya	
1984	Çaresizim	I'm desperate	Ayşe	
1984	Damga	The Seal	Ümran	
1984	Sevmek Yeniden Doğmak	Loving (is) reborning	Leyla	
1984	Fırtına Gönüller	The Storm Hearts		
1984	Çılgın Arzular	Frantic Lust	Leyla	
1985	Gülüşan	Gülüşan	Gülüşan	
1986	Yarın Ağlayacağım	I'm gonna cry tomorrow	Dicle	
1986	Merdoğlu Ömer Bey	Merdoğlu Ömer Bey	Ipek	
1987	Yalnız Kadın	The Lonely Woman	Yaprak	
1988	Arkadaşım Şeytan	My Friend Devil	Manken (the Model)	

=== TV series ===
Year	Original Title	Alt. English Translation	Role	Notes
1994	Zontellektüel Abdullah	Abdullah the Zontellectual		First TV Series
2002	Kumsaldaki İzler	Signs on the beach		
2002	Üzgünüm Leyla	Leyla, I'm Sorry		
