= The Mine (1978 film) =

Maden (The Mine)
- Theatrical film poster
- Directed by: Yavuz Özkan
- Written by: Yavuz Özkan
- Starring: Cüneyt Arkın; Tarık Akan; Hale Soygazi
- Release date: 1978
- Running time: 158 minutes (original) / 195 min (Director's Cut) / 90 min (Simplified)
- Country: Turkey
- Language: Turkish

The Mine (Turkish: Maden) is a 1978 Turkish film starring Cüneyt Arkın, Tarık Akan and Hale Soygazi, and directed by Yavuz Özkan. It is about a group of miners who decide to strike against a greedy mining company to demand better working conditions. The film is from the wave of political films in Turkey during the 1970s and actually represents one of the highest points of activism in the Turkish cinema as the Turkish left was in its peak point too.

== Plot ==
The film narrates a revolutionary current in a mine and the story with the workers. İlyas (Cüneyt Arkın) is a revolutionary man who tries to explain to all the workers that they do not want to work anymore with the bad conditions they have in the mine. These efforts yield results and he saves Nurettin (Tarık Akan) and his friends from the influence of the "yellow union". The workers who were under the rubble at that time had a great impact on this. To calm the unrest of the workers, the owner of the mine brings an amusement park to the city. İlyas and Nurettin organize a petition to overcome this negative situation and improve working conditions. While carrying out these activities, the boss's men assassinate İlyas. After that, the solidarity of the workers among themselves increases and they go on strike, first slowing down the work, and then going on strike after Ilyas collapsed.

== Cast ==
- Cüneyt Arkın ... İlyas
- Tarık Akan ... Nurettin
- Hale Soygazi ... Halkacı Kadın
- Meral Orhonsay ... Nurettin's wife
- Halil Ergün ... Ömer
- Baki Tamer ... Union President
- Nurhan Nur ... Ayşe
- Ahmet Turgutlu ... Company Owner
- Aydın Haberdar ... unionist
- İhsan Yüce

== Awards and nominations ==
Golden Orange awards

- Best film
- Best actor (Tarık Akan)
- Best actress (Hale Soygazi)
- Best supporting actress (Meral Orhonsay)
