= Lale Mansur =

Turkish actress

- Born: Lale Yurdatapan; 1956 (age 68–69); Istanbul, Turkey
- Occupation: Actress
- Years active: 1988–present
- Spouses: Attila Özdemiroğlu (m. 1975; div. 1980) Cem Mansur (m. 1984)

Lale Mansur (née Yurdatapan; born 1956) is a Turkish actress. She has appeared in more than twenty films since 1988.

== Selected filmography ==
Year	Title	Role	Notes
1992	Walking After Midnight	Havva	
2001	Summer Love		
2003	The Encounter		
2007	Bliss		
2009	Love in Another Language		
