= Hale Soygazi =

Turkish actress

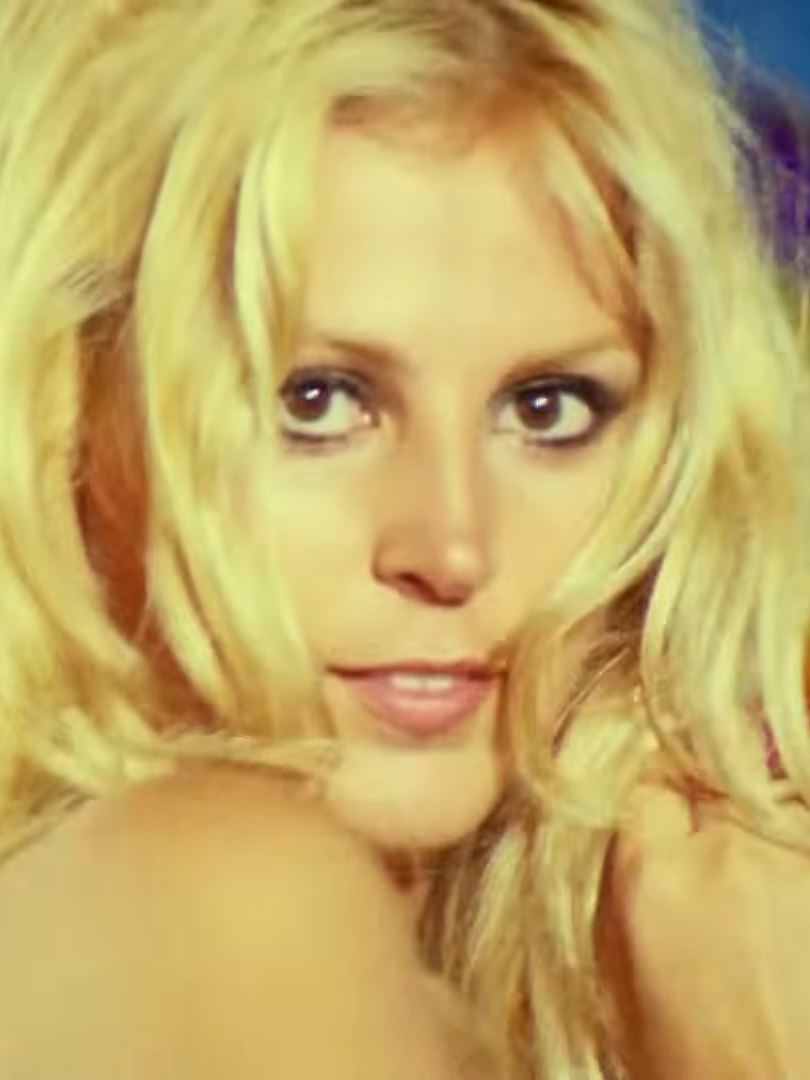
- Soygazi in Kördüğüm (1977)
- Born: 21 September 1950 (age 75); Istanbul, Turkey
- Occupation: Actress
- Years active: 1972–present
- Spouses: Ahmet Özhan (m. 1976; div. 1985) Murat Belge (m. 2006)

Hale Soygazi (born 21 September 1950) is a Turkish actress and beauty pageant titleholder.

== Biography ==
She was born on 21 September in Istanbul, Turkey in 1950. She studied French philology at the university. She was chosen as 'Miss Turkey' in 1973 and also did modeling for magazines. She made her film debut in a leading role in Kara Murat opposite famous actor Cüneyt Arkın. In 1978, she won her first Golden Orange award for her leading role in Maden.

She was married to folk singer Ahmet Özhan who acted with her in Çocuğumu İstiyorum, but they divorced later. Then she married Murat Belge.

== Filmography ==
- 2022– - Hayatımın Şansı
- 2015 - Kaderimin Yazıldığı Gün
- 2011–2013 - Kuzey Güney
- 2009 - Bu Kalp Seni Unutur Mu?
- 2004 - Sil Baştan
- 1997 - Bir Umut
- 1996 - Usta Beni Öldürsene
- 1995 - Aşk Üzerine Söylenmemiş Herşey
- 1992 - Cazibe Hanımın Gündüz Düşleri
- 1990 - Bekle Dedim Gölgeye
- 1989 - Küçük Balıklar Üzerine Bir Masal
- 1989 - Cahide
- 1987 - Kadının Adı Yok Işık
- 1985 - Bir Avuç Cennet
- 1984 - Bir Yudum Sevgi
- 1978 - Maden
- 1977 - Kördüğüm
- 1977 - Sevgili Dayım
- 1976 - Süt Kardeşler
- 1975 - Nereden Çıktı Bu Velet
- 1975 - Adamını Bul
- 1975 - Gece Kuşu Zehra
- 1975 - Bak Yeşil Yeşil
- 1975 - Küçük Bey
- 1974 - Mirasyediler
- 1974 - Kanlı Deniz
- 1974 - Unutma Beni
- 1974 - Ceza Alev
- 1974 - Unutama Beni
- 1974 - Gariban
- 1973 - Aşk Mahkumu
- 1973 - Kabadayının Sonu
- 1973 - Ölüme Koşanlar
- 1973 - Şüphe
- 1973 - Tatlım
- 1973 - Aşkımla Oynama
- 1973 - Bataklık Bülbülü
- 1973 - Arap Abdo
- 1973 - Vurun Kahpeye
- 1973 - Oh Olsun
- 1973 - Sevilmek İstiyorum
- 1973 - Bir Demet Menekşe
- 1973 - Çocuğumu İstiyorum
- 1973 - Mahkum
- 1972 - Bir Garip Yolcu
- 1972 - Kara Murat: Fatih'ın Fedaisi
- 1972 - Kahbe / Bir Kız Böyle Düştü
- 1972 - İtham Ediyorum

Awards
Preceded by Feyzal Kibarer	Miss Turkey; 1973	Succeeded by Harika Değirmenci
Preceded by Semra Özdamar	Golden Orange Award for Best Actress; 1978 for Maden	Succeeded by not awarded
Preceded by Hülya Koçyiğit	Golden Orange Award for Best Actress; 1984 for Bir Yudum Sevgi	Succeeded by Zuhal Olcay
