= Motherland Hotel =

- Film poster
- Directed by: Ömer Kavur
- Written by: Ömer Kavur
- Based on: Motherland Hotel by Yusuf Atılgan
- Produced by: Ömer Kavur; Cengiz Ergun
- Starring: Macit Koper; Şahika Tekand; Serra Yılmaz; Orhan Çağman
- Cinematography: Orhan Oğuz
- Edited by: Odak Film; Alfa Film
- Music by: Atilla Özdemiroğlu
- Release date: 1987
- Running time: 101 minutes
- Country: Turkey
- Language: Turkish

Motherland Hotel (Turkish: Anayurt Oteli) is a 1987 Turkish psychological thriller film directed by Ömer Kavur. It is an adaptation of the novel of the same name by Yusuf Atılgan.

== Plot ==
Zebercet owns a hotel in a small provincial town. He manages to keep it up with the help of one maid, a little girl who lives with him. One evening, one of the clients leaves the hotel, promising to return in a week. Haunted by the memory of the beautiful unknown, it leaves little to be gained by a little melancholy. Overwhelmed by his impulses, he refuses to take any clients, and closes the hotel.

== Cast ==
- Macit Koper - Zebercet
- Şahika Tekand - The lady
- Serra Yılmaz - Ortalıkçı
- Orhan Çağman - Emekli Subay

== Awards ==
- 1987 Antalya Golden Orange Film Festival: Best Director, Second Best Film
- 1987 Istanbul Film Festival: Best Turkish Film
- 1987 Venice Film Festival: FIPRESCI (International Film Critics Federation) Award
