= Atıf Yılmaz =

Turkish film director (1925–2006)

- Born: Atıf Yılmaz Batıbeki; 9 December 1925; Mersin, Turkey
- Died: 5 May 2006 (aged 80); Istanbul, Turkey
- Occupations: Film director, screenwriter
- Years active: 1951–2006
- Spouse(s): Nurhan Nur (m. 1952–1962); Ayşe Şasa (m. ?–?); Deniz Türkali (m. ?–2006)
- Children: 1

Atıf Yılmaz Batıbeki (9 December 1925 – 5 May 2006) was a renowned Turkish film director, screenwriter, and film producer. He was very much a legend in the film industry of Turkey with 119 movies directed. He also wrote screenplays for 53 movies and produced 28 movies from 1951 right up till his death in 2006. He was active in almost every period of the Turkish film industry.

== Early life ==
Atıf Yılmaz was born on 9 December 1925 in Mersin, Turkey to a Kurdish family originally from Palu, Elazığ. After finishing high school in Mersin, he attended the Law School of Istanbul University. Because of his interest in arts, he dropped out of Law School and entered the Painting Department of the Academy of Fine Arts in Istanbul. After graduating from the Academy, he did some painting works in workshops. His education in painting helped him when he was directing his movies, as he once remarked.

== Film career ==
In the beginning, he worked as a film critic, made paintings and wrote film scripts to earn a living. After co-directing two movies as an assistant director to Semih Evin in 1950, his directing career began with the film Kanlı Feryat (The Bloody Cry). In 1960, he established his film company "Yerli Film" with the actor Orhan Günşıray.

The most important movies in his filmography were: Hıçkırık (The Sob), Alageyik (The Fallow Deer), Suçlu (The Guilty One), Seni Kaybedersem (If I Lose You), Yaban Gülü (The Wild Rose), Keşanlı Ali Destanı (Kesanli Ali's Epic), Taçsız Kral (The Crownless King), Toprağın Kanı (Blood of the Earth), Ölüm Tarlası (Death Field), Utanç (The Shame), Zavallılar (The Poor People), Selvi Boylum, Al Yazmalım (My Girl with the Red Scarf), Baskin (The Raid), Adak (The Sacrifice), Bir Yudum Sevgi (A Sip of Love), Adı Vasfiye (Her Name is Vasfiye), Berdel, Düş Gezginleri (Walking After Midnight), Eylül Fırtınası (After the Fall) and Mine.

He made movies that were both fluent and had mainly social messages. Most of the themes of his movies were taboo when they were produced. Particularly "Mine" and "Her Name is Vasfiye" were both revolutionary at the time of their release with themes regarding sexuality and the reaction of society.

He never gave up making movies throughout his life and even in the time when the industry stopped filmmaking due to economic reasons.

Atıf Yılmaz played an important role in the professional career of notable Turkish film directors like Halit Refiğ, Yılmaz Güney, Şerif Gören, Zeki Ökten and Ali Özgentürk.

During the Antalya Film Festival in September 2005, he was admitted to hospital with gastro-intestinal complaints. He died on 5 May 2006 in Istanbul.

== Filmography ==
=== Director ===
- Kanlı Feryad (The Bloody Cry) - 1951
- Mezarımı Taştan Oyun - 1951
- İki Kafadar Deliler Pansiyonunda - 1952
- Aşk Izdırabtır - 1953
- Hıçkırık (The Sob) - 1953
- Şimal Yıldızı (The North Star) - 1954
- Kadın Severse (If a Woman Loves) - 1955
- Dağları Bekleyen Kız (The Girl Who Watched the Mountains) - 1955
- İlk Ve Son (The First and the Last) - 1955
- Beş Hasta Var (There Are Five Patients) - 1956
- Gelinin Muradı - 1957
- Bir Şoförün Gizli Defteri - 1958
- Yaşamak Hakkımdır - 1958
- Kumpanya - 1958
- Karacaoğlan'ın Kara Sevdası - 1959
- Bu Vatanın Çocukları (This Land's Children) - 1959
- Ala Geyik (The Fallow Deer) - 1959
- Ayşecik Şeytan Çekici (Aysecik: Bright Kid) - 1960
- Suçlu (The Guilty One) - 1960
- Dolandırıcılar Şahı (The King of Swindlers) - 1960
- Ölüm Perdesi (The Death Curtain) - 1960
- Seni Kaybedersem (If I Lose You) - 1961
- Tatlı Bela (The Sweet Calamity) - 1961
- Kızıl Vazo (The Red Vase) - 1961
- Allah Cezanı Versin Osman Bey - 1961
- Battı Balık - 1962
- Beş Kardeştiler - 1962
- Bir Gecelik Gelin - 1962
- Cengiz Han'ın Hazineleri (Treasures of Genghis Khan) - 1962
- İki Gemi Yanyana (Two Ships, Side by Side) - 1963
- Azrailin Habercisi (The Messenger of Death) - 1963
- Yarın Bizimdir - 1963
- Kalbe Vuran Düşman - 1964
- Keşanlı Ali Destanı (Kesanli Ali's Epic) - 1964
- Erkek Ali - 1964
- Sayılı Dakikalar - 1965
- Hep O Şarkı - 1965
- Taçsız Kral (The Crownless King) - 1965
- Murat'ın Türküsü - 1965
- Sevgilim Bir Artistti - 1966
- Toprağın Kanı (The Blood of the Earth) - 1966
- Ah Güzel İstanbul (Oh Beautiful Istanbul) - 1966
- Ölüm Tarlası (The Death Field) - 1966]
- Pembe Kadın - 1966
- Harun Reşid'ın Gözdesi - 1967
- Balatlı Arif - 1967
- Kozanoğlu - 1967
- Yasemin'ın Tatlı Aşkı - 1968
- Cemile - 1968
- Köroğlu - 1968
- Kızıl Vazo - 1969
- Kölen Olayım - 1969
- Menekşe Gözler - 1969
- Aşktan da Üstün - 1970
- Zeyno - 1970
- Kara Gözlüm - 1970
- Darıldın Mı Cicim Bana - 1970
- Battal Gazi Destanı - 1971
- Ateş Parçası - 1971
- Unutulan Kadın - 1971
- Yedi Kocalı Hürmüz - 1971
- Güllü - 1972
- Cemo - 1972
- Utanç (Shame) - 1972
- Köle - 1972
- Zulüm - 1972
- Gelinlik Kızlar - 1972
- Günahsızlar - 1972
- Kambur - 1973
- Güllü Geliyor Güllü - 1973
- Mevlana - 1973
- Zavallılar (The Poor People orThe Suffering Ones) - 1974
- Kuma - 1974
- Salako - 1974
- İşte Hayat - 1975
- Çapkın Hırsız - 1975
- Deli Yusuf - 1975
- Hasip İle Nasip - 1976
- Baş Belası - 1976
- Tuzak - 1976
- Mağlup Edilemeyenler - 1976
- Baskın (The Raid) - 1977
- Yangın - 1977
- Selvi Boylum, Al Yazmalım (My Girl with the Red Scarf) - 1977
- Acı Hatıralar - 1977
- Güllüşah İle İbo - 1977
- Seyahatname - 1977
- Kibar Feyzo - 1978
- Minik Serçe (The Little Sparrow) - 1978
- Köşeyi Dönen Adam - 1978
- İnsan Avcısı (Heart of a Father) - 1979
- Adak (The Sacrifice) - 1979
- N'Olacak Şimdi - 1979
- Talihli Amele - 1980
- Deli Kan - 1981
- Dolap Beygiri - 1982
- Mine - 1983
- Seni Seviyorum - 1983
- Şekerpare - 1983
- Bir Yudum Sevgi (A Sip of Love) - 1984
- Dağınık Yatak - 1984
- Adı Vasfiye (Her Name is Vasfiye) - 1985
- Dul Bir Kadın - 1985
- Asiye Nasıl Kurtulur - 1986
- (The Windmill) - 1986
- Aaahh Belinda - 1986
- Kadının Adı Yok - 1987
- Hayallerim, Aşkım Ve Sen - 1987
- Devil, My Friend - 1988
- Ölü Bir Deniz - 1989
- Berdel - 1990
- Bekle Dedim Gölgeye - 1990
- Safiyedir Kızın Adı - 1991
- Walking After Midnight - 1992
- Tatlı Betüş - 1993
- Gece, Melek Ve Bizim Çocuklar - 1993
- Yer Çekimli Aşklar - 1995
- Nihavend Mucize - 1997
- Eylül Fırtınası (After the Fall) - 1999
- Eğreti Gelin - 2004

=== Producer ===
* Dolandırıcılar Şahı (The King of Swindlers) - 1960
- Seni Kaybedersem (If I Lose You) - 1961
- Allah Cezanı Versin Osman Bey - 1961
- Cengiz Han'ın Hazineleri (Treasures of Genghis Khan) - 1962
- Azrailin Habercisi (The Messenger of Death) - 1963
- Yarın Bizimdir - 1963
- Toprağın Kanı (The Blood of the Earth) - 1966
- Maden - 1978
- Minik Serçe - 1978
- Adak - 1979
- Talihli Amele - 1980
- Deli Kan - 1981
- Göl - 1982
- Mine - 1982
- Seni Seviyorum - 1983
- Bir Yudum Sevgi - 1984
- Asiye Nasıl Kurtulur - 1986
- Ölü Bir Deniz - 1989
- İçimizden Biri: Yunus Emre (TV) - 1989
- Safiyedir Kızın Adı - 1991
- Düş Gezginleri - 1992
- Mozaik - 1992
- Gece, Melek Ve Bizim Çocuklar - 1993
- Nihavend Mucize - 1997
- Eylül Fırtınası (After the Fall) - 1999
- Sıdıka - 2000
- Şıh Senem - 2003

=== Screenwriter ===
- Kanlı Feryad - 1951
- İki Kafadar Deliler Pansiyonunda - 1952
- Aşk Izdırabtır - 1953
- Hıçkırık - 1953
- Dağları Bekleyen Kız - 1955
- İlk Ve Son - 1955
- Kadın Severse - 1955
- Beş Hasta Var - 1956
- Gelinin Muradı - 1957
- Bir Şoförün Gizli Defteri - 1958
- Çoban Kızı - 1958
- Kumpanya - 1958
- Yaşamak Hakkımdır - 1958
- Üç Arkadaş - 1958
- Bu Vatanın Çocukları - 1959]
- Ala Geyik - 1959
- Karacaoğlan'ın Kara Sevdası - 1959
- Şoför Nebahat - 1960
- Ateşten Damla - 1960]
- Suçlu - 1960
- Seni Kaybedersem - 1961
- Yaban Gülü - 1961
- İki Gemi Yanyana - 1963
- Öp Annemin Elini - 1964
- Keşanlı Ali Destanı - 1964
- Murat'ın Türküsü - 1965
- Yasemin'ın Tatlı Aşkı - 1968
- Kızıl Vazo - 1969
- Ateş Parçası - 1971
- Battal Gazi Destanı - 1971
- Zavallılar - 1974
- Kuma - 1974
- Deli Yusuf - 1975
- Mağlup Edilemeyenler - 1976
- Güllüşah İle İbo - 1977
- Minik Serçe - 1978
- N'Olacak Şimdi - 1979
- Zübük - 1980
- Deli Kan - 1981
- Mine - 1982
- Dolap Beygiri - 1982
- Bir Yudum Sevgi - 1984
- Dul Bir Kadın - 1985
- Asiye Nasıl Kurtulur - 1986
- Kadının Adı Yok - 1987
- Arkadaşım Şeytan - 1988
- Ölü Bir Deniz - 1989
- Berdel - 1990
- Safiyedir Kızın Adı - 1991
- Düş Gezginleri - 1992
- Tatlı Betüş - 1993
- Eğreti Gelin - 2004

== Awards ==
=== Prizes ===
- Society of Journalists Turkish Film Festival, 1959, This Land's Children, Best Director
- 2nd Antalya Golden Orange Film Festival, 1965, Kesanli Ali's Epic, Best Director
- 2nd Antalya Golden Orange Film Festival, 1965, Kesanli Ali's Epic, Runner-Up Film
- 9th Antalya Golden Orange Film Festival, 1972, Zulüm, Best Director
- 13th Antalya Golden Orange Film Festival, 1976, Deli Yusuf, Best Director
- 15th Antalya Golden Orange Film Festival, 1978, My Girl with the Red Scarf, Best Director
- 21st Antalya Golden Orange Film Festival, 1984, A Sip of Love, Best Director
- Istanbul International Film Festival, 1985, A Sip of Love, Best Turkish Film of the Year
- Istanbul International Film Festival, 1986, Her Name is Vasfiye, Best Turkish Film of the Year
- 23rd Antalya Golden Orange Film Festival, 1986, Ah! Belinda, Best Director
- 10th Istanbul International Film Festival, 1991, Honorary Award
- Valencia Festival of Mediterranean Cinema, 1991, Berdel, Golden Palm for Best Film
- 6th Adana Altın Koza Film Festival, 1992, Berdel, Runner-Up Film
- 33rd Antalya Golden Orange Film Festival, 1996, Honour of Lifetime Award
- 14th Moscow International Film Festival, 1985, Golden Prize nomination (Mine)

=== Honorary doctorate ===
- 1991 Hacettepe University

== Books ==
- Söylemek Güzeldir, Afa Yayınları, May 1995
- Bir Sinemacının Anıları, Doğan Kitapçılık, January 2002

Awards
Preceded by Halit Refiğ	Golden Orange Award for Best Director; 1965 for Keşanlı Ali Destanı	Succeeded by Memduh Ün
Preceded by Muzaffer Aslan	Golden Orange Award for Best Director; 1972 for Zulüm	Succeeded by Nejat Saydam
Preceded by Şerif Gören	Golden Orange Award for Best Director; 1976 for Deli Yusuf	Succeeded by Zeki Ökten
Preceded by Zeki Ökten	Golden Orange Award for Best Director; 1978 for Selvi Boylum, Al Yazmalım	Succeeded by not awarded
Preceded by Zeki Ökten	Golden Orange Award for Best Director; 1984 for Bir Yudum Sevgi	Succeeded by Sinan Çetin
Preceded by Sinan Çetin	Golden Orange Award for Best Director; 1986 for Aaahh Belinda	Succeeded by Ömer Kavur
