= Teyzem =

- Directed by: Halit Refiğ
- Starring: Müjde Ar, Yasar Alptekin, and Mehmet Akan
- Release date: 1986
- Country: Turkey
- Language: Turkish

Teyzem is a 1986 Turkish drama film, directed by Halit Refiğ and starring Müjde Ar, Yasar Alptekin, and Mehmet Akan.
