= Yavuz Özkan (director) =

Turkish film director and screenwriter (1942–2019)

- Born: 1942; Yozgat, Turkey
- Died: 21 May 2019 (aged 76–77); Istanbul, Turkey
- Resting place: Zincirlikuyu Cemetery
- Occupation: Actor
- Years active: 1974–1999

Yavuz Özkan (1942 – 21 May 2019) was a Turkish film director and screenwriter. Özkan is best known for his 1978 film The Mine.

== Selected filmography ==
- "İlkbahar - Sonbahar " (2011)
- Hayal Kurma Oyunları (1999)
- Bir Erkeğin Anatomisi (1997)
- Bir Kadının Anatomisi (1995)
- Yengeç Sepeti (1994)
- Bir Sonbahar Hikayesi 1994
- İki Kadın (1992)
- Ateş Üstünde Yürümek (1991)
- Büyük Yalnızlık (1990)
- Filim Bitti (1989)
- Umut Yarına Kaldı (1988)
- Yağmur Kaçakları (1987)
- Son Savaşçı (1985)
- Sevgiliye Mektuplar (1982)
- Demiryol (1979)
- The Mine 1978
- Vardiya (1976)
- Yarış (1975)
- 2x2=5 (1974)
