= Hristo Boychev =

Bulgarian writer born on March 5, 1950

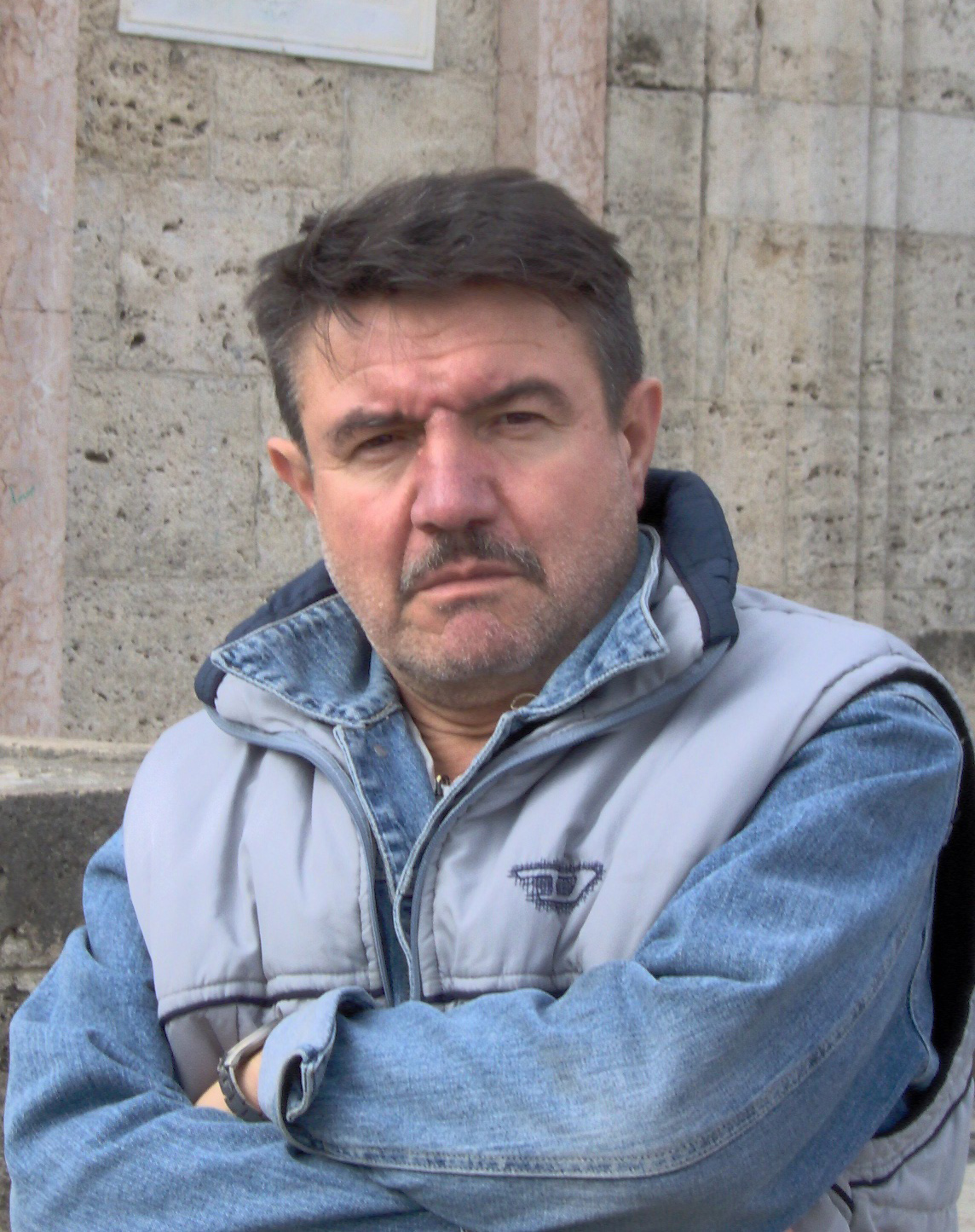
Hristo Boytchev in 2015

Hristo Boytchev (Bulgarian Cyrillic, Христо Бойчев) is a Bulgarian writer born on March 5, 1950. The Colonel Bird won the British Council Award for Central and Eastern Europe, and was later adapted into a film, Voenno Poleva Bolnitza (Field Mental Asylum). He is regarded as one of Bulgaria's leading playwrights.

== Works ==
- The Colonel Bird, 2007
  - In a small psychiatric ward situated in a former monastery and lost somewhere in the mountains in the Balkans, six patients and a very young doctor are left to their fate. In the winter they are completely snow-bound and lost to the world; left without food, heating or pharmaceuticals. They even have to gather together in a single room, to avoid freezing to death. At the fatal moment when the patients are facing their hungry and cold death, UN planes heading from Bosnia, having lost their way in a winter storm during the night, drop humanitarian aid by mistake. The parcels contain food and military uniforms for clothes. The next morning one of the patients, a former military man, who has remained speechless for the past three years, approaches – shaved, trim and dapper in a military uniform. His compelling behaviour very quickly provokes the patients' military reflexes and they gradually remember life in the barracks, and eventually adapt themselves to it. The strict military discipline makes them forget their illness and transforms them into a combat military unit. In act of gratitude for UN assistance, they decide to join NATO. Dresses up as "Blue helmets" they start to western Europe... (hristoboytchev.com)
- The Underground , 2006
  - Beneath Rome, Napoli, Alexandria, Sicily and North Africa there are thousands of kilometers of catacombs. Some people think that somewhere in the labyrinths there are people still alive, mutated descendants from the era of the Roman Empire (hristoboytchev.com)
- District Hospital
  - An unidentified patient, who has lost his memory, appears in a small district hospital in the deep countryside. Obviously a man of the soil he had been found in a state of shock beside a crashed NATO-aircraft. Not knowing his name, the doctors give name him after his diagnosis Contusio Cerebris. This strange "name" is a reason to be suspected of being the crashed American pilot by the other patients ( all of them are common people). Of course he doesn't speak English because he has it forgotten after the shock. Day after day they create for him the biography of a very important and rich military man, basing their fantasy on the myth of the Great America. In the beginning he doesn't believe it but little by little he begins to like this story. In finally they even invent his wife - a beautiful American actress. The man falls in love in his "wife" and constantly watches TV, hoping to recognize her. Being afraid of losing his memory again, he writes down his "biography" several times (to be safe). One of the other patients sends all the copies to the most famous word medias and "the sensation" blows up over the world. A special NATO-commission (searching for disappeared soldiers) arrives and hands him military cross "July The Fourth". The ceremony appears on the CNN-news... One day his wife arrives too. Unfortunately she isn't an actress but a modest village woman who has recognized her husband on TV. The meeting is either funny and tragic. The man refuses to accept the reality and continues to live in his inexistent but wonderful biography. Eventually Colonel Cerebris finds the wife of his dreams... This is the story of only one of the five main characters. All the others participate in it and have their own fortune. (hristoboytchev.com)
- The Colonel & The Birds (Female fersion of The Colonel Bird)
  - Set in the WWII era, the play follows the lives of six patients and a new doctor in a forgotten convent-turned-psychiatric ward somewhere in the Balkan Mountains. One stormy night, a lost UN plane accidentally drops off humanitarian aid boxes filled with food and military uniforms. The next morning, the patients awaken to one of their own, a former military man who hadn't spoken in three years, clean-shaven and smartly dressed in uniform, ordering them to fall in line. Under the Colonel's strict military discipline, the patients form their own unit and decide to join NATO. They head westward through Europe, leaving their illnesses behind.
- That Thing
- The Labyrinth
- Count - Doun (monodrama)

== Sources ==
- Éditions L'Espace d'un instant
