= The Encounter (2003 film) =

- Theatrical Poster
- Directed by: Ömer Kavur
- Written by: Ömer Kavur; Macit Koper
- Produced by: Ömer Kavur; Sadik Deveci
- Starring: Uğur Polat; Lale Mansur; Çetin Tekindor; İsmail Hacıoğlu; Aytaç Arman; Ani İpekkaya
- Cinematography: Ali Utku
- Edited by: Mevlüt Koçak
- Music by: Tamer Çıray
- Production company: Alfa Film
- Distributed by: A&P Filmcilik
- Release date: December 26, 2003
- Running time: 127 minutes
- Countries: Turkey; Hungary
- Language: Turkish

The Encounter (Turkish: Karşılaşma) is a 2003 Turkish-Hungarian drama film, co-written, co-produced and directed by Ömer Kavur, starring Uğur Polat as a man embarking on a new life. The film, which went on nationwide general release across Turkey on December 26, 2003, won five awards at the 40th Antalya "Golden Orange" International Film Festival, including the Golden Orange for Best Film. It was the final film of Turkish director Ömer Kavur, who described it as, "the unadorned story of an interesting search in the midst of extraordinary circumstances with surrealistic overtones."
