= Yusuf Atılgan =

Turkish novelist (1921–1989)

- Born: Yusuf Ziya Atılgan; 27 June 1921; Manisa, Ottoman Empire
- Died: 9 October 1989 (aged 68); Istanbul, Turkey
- Education: Istanbul University
- Occupation: Novelist
- Writing career
- Pen name: Nevzat Çorum, Ziya Atılgan
- Language: Turkish
- Period: 1947–1989
- Notable works: Aylak Adam; Anayurt Oteli

Yusuf Atılgan (27 June 1921 – 9 October 1989) was a Turkish novelist and dramatist, who is best known for his novels Aylak Adam (The Loiterer) and Anayurt Oteli (Motherland Hotel). He is one of the pioneers of the modern Turkish novel.

Atılgan is considered one of the pioneers of the modern Turkish novel. His novels had a psychological style, digging into themes such as loneliness, questioning, meaning of life, and the mindful journey of people. His novels were influenced by modernism.

Atılgan finished middle school in Manisa, then high school in Balıkesir. He graduated in Turkish language and literature from Istanbul University. He finished his thesis titled Tokatlı Kani: Sanat, şahsiyet ve psikoloji under supervision of Nihat Tarlan. Atılgan then began teaching literature at Maltepe Askeri Lisesi in Akşehir. In 1946, he settled down at a village named Hacırahmanlı near Manisa where he took up writing. His novel Aylak Adam was published in 1959 which dealt with psychological themes such as loneliness, scope and possibility of love, meaning of life, seeking, and obsession. This was followed in 1973 by Anayurt Oteli, which narrated the life of a hotel doorkeeper(named Zebercet) in an Anatolian town, with deep psychological examinations and touching themes such as sexuality and obsession. It gained further fame with a film based on the novel. In 1976, he began working in Istanbul as an editor and translator. With his wife Serpil he had a son in 1979 named Mehmet.

Atılgan died of a heart attack in 1989 while in the middle of writing a novel titled Canistan.

== Bibliography ==
Novels

- Aylak Adam (1959)
- Anayurt Oteli (1973)
- Canistan (2000)
- Motherland Hotel: Translated from the Turkish by Fred Stark -City Lights Publishers. (2016). ISBN 9780872867116

Short Stories

- Bodur Minareden Öte (1960)
- Çocuk Kitabı: Ekmek Elden Süt Memeden (1981)
- Eylemci (Bütün Öyküleri (1992)

Translations

- Toplumda Sanat (K. Baynes; 1980)

Plays

- Toplumda Sanat (K. Baynes; 1980).
