= Gece Yolculuğu =

1987 Turkish film

- Theatrical film poster
- Directed by: Ömer Kavur
- Written by: Ömer Kavur
- Produced by: Sadık Deveci; Ömer Kavur
- Starring: Aytaç Arman; Macit Koper; Şahika Tekand; Arslan Kacar; Orhan Çağman
- Cinematography: Salih Dikişçi
- Music by: Attila Özdemiroğlu
- Production company: Alfa Film
- Release date: 1987
- Running time: 100 minutes
- Country: Turkey
- Language: Turkish

Gece Yolculuğu (lit. 'Night Journey') is a 1987 Turkish drama film, written, co-produced, and directed by Ömer Kavur, featuring Aytaç Arman as a screenwriter traveling with his business partner around the Turkish countryside in search of a filming location which will inspire him. The film premiered in the Un Certain Regard section at the 41st Cannes Film Festival and was screened in competition at the 25th Antalya Golden Orange Film Festival, where it won Golden Oranges for Best Film, Best Director, Best Actor, and Best Cinematography.

== Cast ==
- Aytaç Arman as Ali
- Macit Koper as Yavuz
- Sahika Tekand
- Arslan Kacar
- Orhan Çagman
- Nurseli İdiz
- Osman Alyanak
