= A Sip of Love =

A Sip of Love (Bir Yudum Sevgi)
- Directed by: Atıf Yılmaz
- Written by: Atıf Yılmaz; Fehmi Yaşar
- Starring: Kadir İnanır; Hale Soygazi; Macit Koper; Meral Çetinkaya
- Cinematography: Çetin Tunca
- Release date: 1984
- Running time: 87 minutes
- Country: Turkey
- Language: Turkish

A Sip of Love (Turkish: Bir Yudum Sevgi) is a 1984 Turkish drama film, co-written, co-produced and directed by Atıf Yılmaz, featuring Kadir İnanır and Hale Soygazi. She lives an unhappily married life but things change when her husband loses his job and she is forced to find factory work. The film screened in competition at the 21st Antalya Golden Orange Film Festival, where it won Golden Oranges for Best Film, Best Director, Best Actress, Best Supporting Actress and Best Music, and the 4th International Istanbul Film Festival, where it won Best Turkish Film.

== Plot ==
Aygül and Cuma live a joyless life, stuck in an unhappy marriage with four children. After Cemal loses his job and Aygül is forced to go and work in a factory to support the family, she moves away taking their children with her and he tries to win them back.

== Cast ==
- Kadir İnanır (Cemal)
- Hale Soygazi (Aygül)
- Macit Koper (Cuma)
- Meral Çetinkaya (Nezaket)

== Awards ==
The film won 5 awards at the 21st Antalya Golden Orange Film Festival: Best Film, Best Director (for Atıf Yılmaz), Best Actress (for Hale Soygazi), Best Supporting Actor (for Macit Koper) and Best Music (for Yalçın Tura). It also won the Best Turkish Film award at the İstanbul Film Festival.
