= Şekerpare (film) =

- Directed by: Atıf Yılmaz
- Starring: İlyas Salman; Şener Şen
- Release date: 1983
- Running time: 1h 30min
- Country: Turkiye
- Language: Turkish

Şekerpare (English: Sugar Pie Lady) is a 1983 Turkish comedy film directed by Atıf Yılmaz.

== Cast ==
- İlyas Salman - Cumali
- Şener Şen - Ziver Bey
- Yaprak Özdemiroğlu - Sekerpare
- Ayşen Gruda - Peyker
- Şevket Altuğ - Hursit
- Neriman Köksal - Letafet
- Berrin Koper - Afet
- Ali Taygun - Galatali
- Serra Yılmaz - Mahmure
- Ayten Erman - Hamdune
- Hüseyin Kutman - Nazir
