= Aysel Gürel =

Turkish actress and lyricist (1929–2008)

- Born: Gönül Aysel Gürel; 7 February 1929; Sarayköy, Denizli, Turkey
- Died: 17 February 2008 (aged 79); Istanbul, Turkey
- Education: Istanbul University
- Occupations: Lyricist, actress
- Spouse: Ahmet Vedat Akın (m. 1954; div. 1957)
- Children: Müjde Ar; Mehtap Ar

Gönül Aysel Gürel (7 February 1929 – 17 February 2008) was a Turkish lyricist and actress. Besides her lyrics, which were performed by singers throughout Turkey, she was known for her outlandish clothing, make up and wigs.

== Biography ==
Aysel Gürel was born in 1929 in Denizli, Turkey, in the western part of the country. She graduated from Istanbul University with a faculty of literature degree. Her lyrics were performed by such noted Turkish singers as Sezen Aksu. Besides lyric writing, Gürel also worked as an actress, drama player and a Turkologist. In 2007, Gürel appeared in a Turkish television commercial for Pepsi. Gürel was admitted to Metropolitan Florence Nightingale Hospital in Istanbul in December 2007. She was reportedly ill with lung cancer. She died of chronic bronchitis at the age of 79 on 17 February 2008 in Istanbul. Gürel was buried at Zincirlikuyu Cemetery following a funeral at Teşvikiye Mosque. Gürel was the mother of Turkish actresses, Müjde Ar and Mehtap Ar.

== Tribute ==
On 7 February 2018, Google celebrated her 89th birthday with a Google Doodle.

== Songs written by ==
She wrote the lyrics of very popular songs that reached smash hit and classical status in Turkey's music history such as;

- Allahaısmarladık (1977) by Sezen Aksu
- Firuze^{[A]} (1982) by Sezen Aksu
- Sen Ağlama^{[A]} (1984) by Sezen Aksu
- Haydi Gel Benimle Ol (1984) by Sezen Aksu
- Sevda (1985) by Nükhet Duru
- Sonbahar (1986) by Sezen Aksu
- Ünzile (1986) by Sezen Aksu
- Değer Mi (1986) by Sezen Aksu
- Sarışın (1988) by Sezen Aksu
- Dünya Tatlısı (1988) by Zerrin Özer
- Hani Yeminin (1988) by Zerrin Özer
- Bir Kız (1988) by Ayşegül Aldinç
- Şekerim (1989) by Gökben
- Resmin Yok Bende (1990) by Ajda Pekkan
- Hadi Bakalım (1991) by Sezen Aksu
- Ne Kavgam Bitti Ne Sevdam (1991) by Sezen Aksu
- Gelmeyeceğim (1991) by Ayşegül Aldinç
- Abone (1991) by Yonca Evcimik
- Taksit Taksit (1991) by Yonca Evcimik
- Ayıpsın (1991)^{[A]} by Aşkın Nur Yengi
- Show Yapma (1992) by Nilüfer
- Yine Yeni Yeniden Sev (1992) by Nilüfer
- Hadi Yine İyisin (1993) by Tayfun
- Yok (1993) by Ajda Pekkan
- Vurulmuşum Sana (1994) by Asya
- Of Aman (1994) by Nalan
- Yasaksız Seviş Benimle (1994) by Tarkan
- Eğrisi Doğrusu (1994) by Nilüfer
- Gölge Çiçeği (1997) by Reyhan Karaca
- Vur Yüreğim (1999) by Sertab Erener
- Aşk (1999) by Sertab Erener
- Tılsım (2001) by Burcu Güneş

A She wrote the song with Sezen Aksu.

== Tribute albums ==
- Aysel'in (2013)
