= Akrebin Yolculuğu =

1997 film

Akrebin Yolculuğu (Journey on a Clock Hand)
- Film poster
- Directed by: Ömer Kavur
- Written by: Ömer Kavur; Macit Koper
- Produced by: Ömer Kavur
- Starring: Mehmet Aslantuğ
- Cinematography: Erdal Kahraman
- Edited by: Mevlüt Kocak
- Music by: Attila Özdemiroğlu
- Release date: 2 May 1997
- Running time: 118 minutes
- Country: Turkey
- Language: Turkish

Akrebin Yolculuğu (English: Journey on a Clock Hand) is a 1997 Turkish romance film directed by Ömer Kavur. It was screened in the Un Certain Regard section at the 1997 Cannes Film Festival.

== Plot ==
Clockmaker Kerem sets out with a key given to him by a mysterious man and finds the clock tower he is meant to repair. However, this clock tower introduces him to an extremely enigmatic woman. The mysterious woman lives bound to the clock tower and has a profound effect on Kerem. Strange events begin to unfold, and the mysterious town starts to dismantle the very concept of time.

== Cast ==
- Mehmet Aslantuğ as Kerem
- Sahika Tekand as Esra
- Tuncel Kurtiz as Agah
- Nüvit Özdoğru as Hotel owner
- Macit Koper as Bell founder
- Rana Cabbar as Butler
- Tomris Oğuzalp
- Mümtaz Açıkgöz
- Aytaç Arman as Mysterious man
- Kenan Bal
- Aslan Kaçar
- Etem Kara
- Arzu Kuyas
- Mahmut Yıldırım
- Ruşen Yılmaz

== See also ==
- Cinema of Turkey
