= Ömer Kavur =

Turkish film director

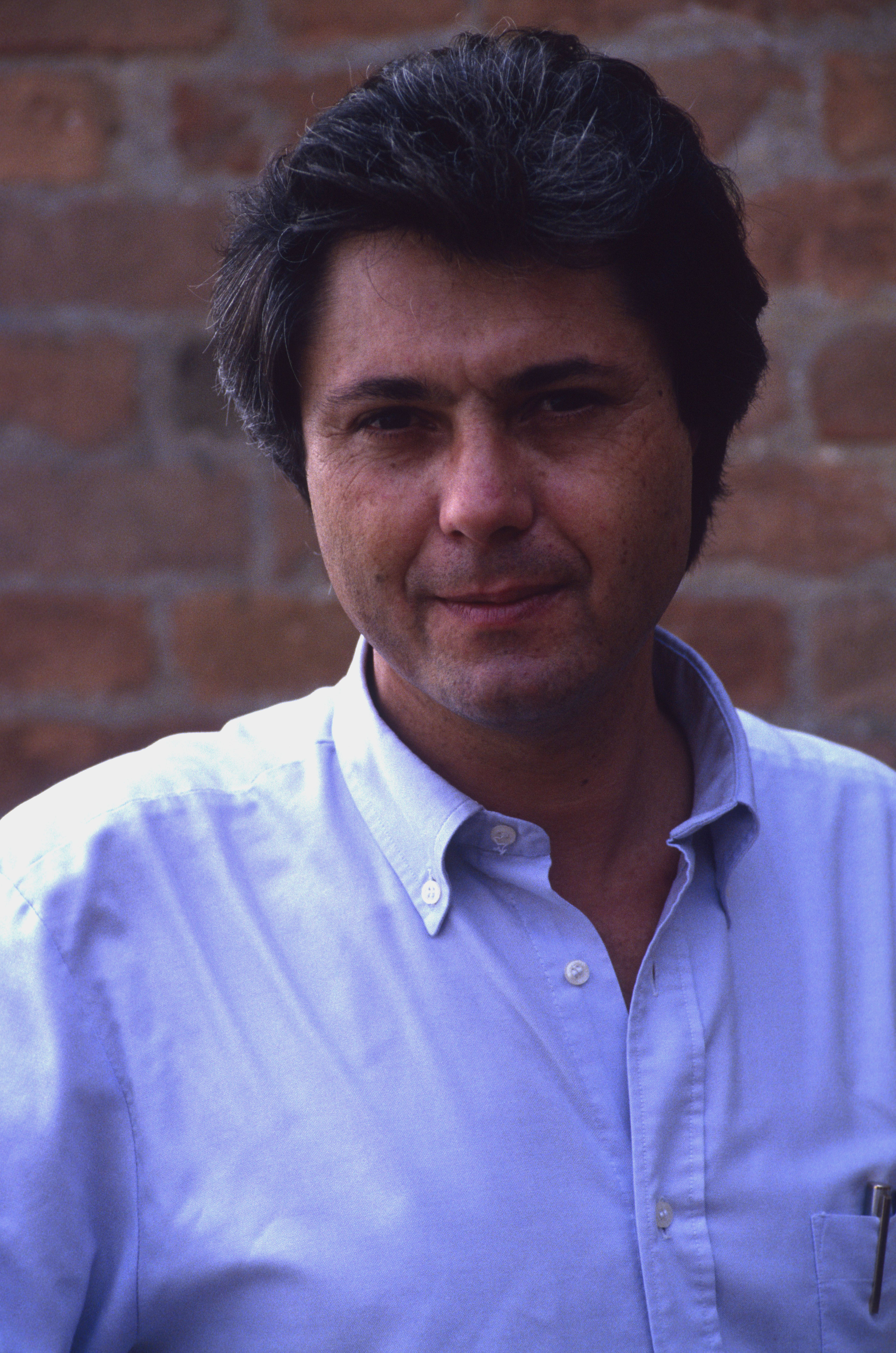
- Born: 18 June 1944; Ankara, Turkey
- Died: 12 May 2005 (aged 60); Teşvikiye, Istanbul, Turkey
- Resting place: Zincirlikuyu Cemetery
- Occupations: Film director; film producer; screenwriter
- Years active: 1974–2003

Ömer Kavur (18 June 1944 – 12 May 2005) was a Turkish film director, film producer and screenwriter.

== Career ==
He directed fourteen films between 1974 and 2003. His film, Gece Yolculuğu was screened in the Un Certain Regard section at the 1988 Cannes Film Festival. Nine years later, his film Akrebin Yolculuğu was screened in the same section at the 1997 Festival.

== Death ==
He died on 12 May 2005, of lymphoma at his home in Teşvikiye, Istanbul, and was buried at the Zincirlikuyu Cemetery following the religious funeral service held at the Teşvikiye Mosque.

== Filmography ==
- Yatık Emine (1974)
- Yusuf ile Kenan (1979)
- Kırık bir aşk hikâyesi (1981)
- Ah güzel Istanbul (1981)
- Göl (1982)
- Körebe (1985)
- Amansız Yol (1985)
- Gece Yolculuğu (1987)
- Anayurt Oteli (1987)
- Gizli yüz (1991)
- Aşk üzerine söylenmemis hersey (1996)
- Akrebin Yolculuğu (1997)
- Melekler Evi (2000)
- Karşılaşma (2003)
