= List of Turkish films of 1977 =

A list of films produced in Turkey in 1977 (see 1976 in film):

Name	Director	Starring	Film studio	Genre	Notes
Adalet	Melih Gülgen	Cüneyt Arkın, Reha Yurdakul, Kenan Pars, Meral Deniz	Gülgen Film	Macera, Aksiyon, Polisiye	
Affedilmeyen	Savaş Eşici	Tanju Korel, Aysun Güven, Figen Han	Kımız Film	Erotic adventure	
Ah Bu Ne Dünya	Taner Oğuz	Ünsal Emre, Sevda Karaca, Romina Terry	Se-Ta Prodüksiyon	Erotic comedy	
Ah Bu Sevda	Oğuz Gözen	Erol Büyükburç, Ülkü Özen, Nazan Saatçi	Ceylan Film	Musical comedy-drama	
Akdeniz Kartalı	Çetin İnanç	Yalçın Gülhan, Ahu Tuğba, Kazım Kartal, Tarık Şimşek	Osmanlı Film	Adventure crime	Turkish-Jordan co-production film
Akrep Yuvası	Melih Gülgen	Cüneyt Arkın, Banu Alkan, Eşref Kolçak, Hayati Hamzaoğlu	Uğur Film	Crime action	
Al Gülüm Ver Gülüm	Olgun Eltan	Salih Güney, Feri Cansel, Aydemir Akbaş	Olgun Film	Erotic comedy	
Alman Gelin					
Alo Polis					
Ana Ocağı					
Aslan Bacanak					
Aşk Arzu Ve Silah					
Aşk Dönemeci					
Aşk Durağı					
Aşk Mahkumları					
Aşkın Sesini Dinleme					
Ava Giden Avlanır					
Baba Ocağı					
Babanın Evlatları	Natuk Baytan, Ernst Hofbauer	Tarık Akan, Alberto Dell'Acqua, Reza Beyk Imanverdi, Öztürk Serengil, Marina D'Aunia, Hüseyin Alp	Erler Film	Adventure comedy	Turkish-Italian-West German-Iranian co-production film
Baraj					
Baskın			Erler Film		
Bazıları Cacık Sever					
Beceriksizler					
Bedia					
Belki Bir Gün					
Benim Altı Sevgilim					
Benim Gibi Sevenler					
Beyaz Kuş					
Bir Tanem					
Bir Yiğit Gurbete Gitse					
Bizim Kız			Erler Film		
Cemal					
Cemil Dönüyor					
Cennetin Çocukları					
Cesur Yabancı					
Çakal Avı					
Çeşme					
Çırılçıplak					
Çifte Nikah					
Çöpçüler Kralı					
Denizler Hakimi					
Derbeder					
Dila Hanım					
Dokunmayın Dünyama					
Dört Ateşli Yosma			Birlik Film	Erotic adventure	
Erkeğim					
Enayiler Kralı					
Eşref					
Acı Hatıralar					
Fırtına					
Fıratın Cinleri					
Garip					
Gönül Ferman Dinlemez					
Gülünüz Güldürünüz					
Gülen Gözler					
Güllüşah İle İbo					
İntikam Meleği (Kadın Hamlet)					
Günahın Bedeli					
Güneş Ne Zaman Doğacak					
Güneşli Bataklık					
Hababam Sınıfı Tatilde					
Hain					
Hatasız Kul Olmaz					
Hakanlar Çarpışıyor					
Hayata Dönüş					
Hedefteki Adam					
Hıdır					
Hırsız Milyoner					
Hırçın Kız					
Hızlı Giden Yorulur					
İki Aşk Arasında					
İkimiz De Sevdik					
İstasyon					
Kaçaklar					
Kan					
Kanunsuz Sokak					
Kızını Dövmeyen Dizini Döver					
Korkusuzlar					
Kördüğüm					
Kuşku					
Küçük Ev					
Kükreyen Aslan					
Lanet (İlenç)					
Leyla					
Liseli Kızlar					
Mavi Mersedes					
Memiş					
Meryem Ve Oğulları					
Ne Zaman Geleceksin					
Nehir					
Onu Kötü Vurdular					
Öl Seve Seve					
Ölmeyen Şarkı			Erler Film		
Sakar Şakir					
Sapık					
Sarhoş					
Sarmaş Dolaş					
Satılmış Adam					
Selvi Boylum Al Yazmalım	Atıf Yılmaz	Türkan Şoray, Kadir İnanır, Ahmet Mekin	Yeşilçam Film	Romantic drama	Based on the novel of the same name
Sen Aşk Nedir Bilir Misin	Yücel Uçanoğlu	Salih Güney, Arzu Okay	Barış Prodüksiyon	Erotic romance	
Sen ve Ben	Yücel Uçanoğlu	Bülent Kayabaş, Arzu Okay	Kuzey Film	Erotic comedy	
Sensiz Yaşayamam	Metin Erksan	Hülya Koçyiğit, Cemal Gencer	Elif Film	Psychological drama	
Sevgili Dayım	Zeki Ökten	Tarık Akan, Hale Soygazi, Suleyman Turan, Perran Kurban	Özer Film	Adventure romantic comedy-drama	
Sevgili Oğlum	Cüneyt Arkın	Cüneyt Arkın, Tuğrul Meteer, Perihan Savaş, Simin Ghaffari	Sezer Film	Action drama	Turkish-Iranian co-production film; Iranian version unreleased
Sihirli Gözlük	Alev Akakar	Ünsal Emre, Nükhet Egeli	Kader Film	Fantastik, Erotik	
Silah Arkadaşları	Osman F. Seden	Kadir İnanır, Perihan Savaş, Reza Beyk Imanverdi, Eşref Kolçak	Sezer Film	Action drama	Turkish-Iranian co-production film
Sivri Akıllılar	Zeki Alasya	Zeki Alasya, Metin Akpınar, Perran Kutman	Erman Film	Comedy	
Son Gülen Tam Güler	Çetin İnanç, Yücel Uçanoğlu	Yalçın Gülhan, Kazım Kartal, Necla Fide, Alev Altın	Gaye Film	Erotic adventure	
Şaban Oğlu Şaban	Ertem Eğilmez	Kemal Sunal, Halit Akçatepe, Adile Naşit, Şener Şen, Ayşen Gruda, Şevket Altuğ	Arzu Film	Historical comedy	
Şeref Sözü	Osman F. Seden	Tarık Akan, Perihan Savaş, Reza Beyk Imanverdi	Sezer Film	Drama	
Şeref Yumruğu	Remzi Jöntürk	Serdar Gökhan, Nalan Çöl, Nejat Özbek, Turgut Özatay	Barlık Film	Erotic adventure	
Şöhretin Bedeli	Naki Yurter	Salih Kırmızı, Necla Fide	Hülya Film	Erotic adventure	
Tatlı Kaçık	Ergin Orbey	Mahmut Hekimoğlu, Müjde Ar	Özer Film	Komedi, Duygusal	
Tatlı Melek	Yılmaz Atadeniz	Salih Kırmızı, Arzu Okay, Bilal İnci	Ender Film	Erotic comedy adventure	
Tövbekar	Ertem Göreç	Kadir İnanır, Sezer İnanoğlu, Pouri Banayi, Erol Taş	Sezer Film	Drama	Turkish-Iranian co-production film
Unutamam Seni	Oksal Pekmezoğlu	Alev Sezer, Aysun Güven, Orhan Alkan	Gaye Film	Drama	
Vahşi Sevgili	Tolgay Ziyal	Müjde Ar, Selçuk Özer	Elif Film	Macera, Dram, Duygusal, Erotik	
Vur Gözünün Üstüne	Çetin İnanç	Tamer Yiğit, Emel Aydan, Alev Altın, Ali Sururi	Gaye Film	Erotic adventure	
Yalnız Adam	Feridun Kete	Ünsal Emre, Ceyda Karahan	Kımız Film	Erotic adventure	
Yangın	Atıf Yılmaz	Ayhan Işık, Necla Nazır, Fikret Hakan	Akün Film	Crime action	
Yansın Bu Dünya	Oksal Pekmezoğlu	Esengül, Adnan Şenses, Feridun Çölgeçen	Umut Film	Musical drama	
Yaşamak Güzel Şey	Çetin İnanç	Tamer Yiğit, Aysun Güven, Baki Tamer	Erta Film	Crime action	
Yeşilçam Sokağı	Ülkü Erakalın	Bülent Kayabaş, Aydemir Akbaş, Gönül Tansel, Cahide Sonku	Ülkü Film	Comedy	
Yıkılmayan Adam	Remzi Jöntürk	Cüneyt Arkın, Suna Yıldızoğlu, Eşref Kolçak	Kalkavan Film	Adventure, Crime	
Yuvanın Bekçileri	Osman F. Seden	Serdar Gökhan, Müşerref Tezcan, Fikret Hakan, Eşref Kolçak	Erman Film	Action, Crime, Drama	
Zehirli Çiçek	Oksal Pekmezoğlu	Arzu Okay, Tarık Şimşek	Gaye Film	Erotic adventure	

== See also ==
- 1977 in Turkey
