= Cansel =

Cansel is a Turkish given name and also surname. It may refer to:

== Given name ==
- Cansel Deniz (born 1991), Kazakhstani taekwondo athlete
- Cansel Elçin (born 1973), Turkish actor
- Cansel Kiziltepe (born 1975), Turkish-German economist
- Cansel Özkan (born 2003), Turkish weightlifter

== Surname ==
- Feri Cansel (1944–1983), Turkish Cypriot actress
- Zümrüt Cansel (born 1963), Turkish Cypriot actress
