= Political cinema =

Films with political themes

Political cinema, in the narrow sense, refers to cinema products that portray events or social conditions, either current or historical, through a partisan perspective, with the intent of informing or agitating the spectator.

Political cinema exists in different forms, such as documentaries, short films, feature films, experimental films, and even animated cartoons.

== Concept ==
In the narrow sense of the term, political cinema refers to films that do not hide their political stance. In this sense, they differ from other films not because they are political, but because of the way in which their politics is presented. As such, a film does not necessarily have to be pure propaganda to be considered 'political cinema'.

The broader meaning of 'political cinema' is argued to be that "all films are political;" even films that are ostensibly 'apolitical' and escapist, merely promising 'entertainment' as an escape from everyday life, can be understood as fulfilling a political function. The authorities in Nazi Germany, for instance, knew this very well and organized a large production of deliberately escapist films. In other 'entertainment' films, such as westerns, the ideological bias is evident in the distortion of historical reality. A "classical" western would rarely portray black cowboys, although there were a great many of them in the American frontier. Hollywood cinema, which can be understood as the dominant industry of cinema, was often accused of misrepresenting black, female, gay, and working-class people. More fundamentally, not only are the contents of individual films political, but the institution of cinema itself can also be taken as political as well. A huge number of people congregate, not to act together or to talk to each other, but to sit silently, after having paid for it, to be spectators separated from each other. Guy Debord, a critic of the 'society of the spectacle', for whom "separation is the alpha and omega of the spectacle," was therefore also violently opposed to cinema, even though he would make several films portraying his ideas.

In order to differentiate between the narrow and broad notions of 'political cinema', film scholar Ewa Mazierska suggested to divide all such films into the categories of conformist or oppositional and marked or unmarked:

- Conformist films "accept the political status quo;" while oppositional films reject it.
- Marked political films are willing to reveal to their viewers the party/ideology "they serve"; while unmarked films prefer to hide it.

From this point of view, it is the oppositional and marked political films that the most viewers regard as 'political', as discussions about politics in film typically single out these two categories.

== History ==
=== Cinema, World War I and its aftermath ===
Before World War I French cinema had a big share of the world market. Hollywood used the collapse of the French production to establish its hegemony. Ever since it has dominated world film production not only economically but has transformed cinema into a means to disseminate American values.

In Germany the Universum Film AG, better known as UFA, was founded to counter the perceived dominance of American propaganda. During the Weimar Republic many films about Frederick II of Prussia had a conservative nationalistic agenda, as Siegfried Kracauer and other film critics noted.

Communists like Willi Münzenberg saw the Russian cinema as a model of political cinema. Soviet films by Sergei Eisenstein, Dziga Vertov and others combined a partisan view of the bolshevist regime with artistic innovation which also appealed to western audiences.

=== National Socialism ===
Leni Riefenstahl has never been able or willing to face her responsibility as a chief propagandist for National-Socialism, i.e., Nazism. Almost unlimited resources and her undeniable talent led to results, which, despite their hideous aims, still fascinate some aficionados of film. While there is much controversy around her work, it is generally accepted that Riefenstahl's main commitment was to filmmaking, rather than to the Nazi Party. Proof of this might be seen by the portrayal of Jesse Owens' victory in her film about the 1936 Olympic games in Berlin, Olympia (1938), and in her later work, mostly on her photographic expeditions to Africa.

The same is certainly not true of the violent anti-Semitic films of Fritz Hippler. Other Nazi political films made propaganda for so-called euthanasia.

=== Recent films ===
Especially in the last decades of the 20th century, many filmmakers considered focusing on remembrance of and reflection upon major collective crimes such as the Holocaust, slavery and disasters such as the Chernobyl disaster to be their political and moral duty.

==== Globalization and related world issues ====
Political cinema of the 21st century seems to focus on controversial topics such as globalization, AIDS, and other health-care concerns, issues pertaining to the environment, such as world energy resources and consumption and climate change, and other complex matters pertaining to discrimination, capitalism, terrorism, war, peace, religious and related forms of intolerance, and civil and political rights, as well as other human rights.

== Forms ==
The form has always been an important concern for political filmmakers. While some, like pioneering Lionel Rogosin, argued that radical films, in order to liberate the imagination of the spectator, have to break not only with the content but also with the form of Dominant cinema, the falsely reassuring clichés and stereotypes of conventional narrative film making, other directors such as Francesco Rosi, Costa Gavras, Ken Loach, Oliver Stone, Spike Lee or Lina Wertmüller preferred to work within mainstream cinema to reach a wider audience.

The subversive tradition dates back at least to the French avant-garde of the 1920s. Even in his more conventional films Luis Buñuel stuck to the spirit of outright revolt of L'Âge d'or. The bourgeoisie had to be expropriated and all its values destroyed, the surrealists believed. This spirit of revolt is also present in all films of Jean Vigo.

== Selected filmography ==
The following is a listing of notable political films or political films made by notable directors:

Political filmography
Title	Year	Director(s)	Country	Type of film	Notes
The Birth of a Nation	1915	D. W. Griffith	United States	Feature	
Stachka (Strike)	1925	Sergei Eisenstein	Soviet Union	Feature	
Bronenosets Potyomkin (Battleship Potemkin)	1925	Sergei Eisenstein	Soviet Union	Feature	
Padenie dinastii Romanovykh (The Fall of the Romanov Dynasty)	1927	Esfir Shub	Soviet Union	Feature	
Chelovek s kino-apparatom (Man with a Movie Camera)	1929	Dziga Vertov	Soviet Union	Documentary	
Mädchen in Uniform (Girls in Uniform)	1931	Leontine Sagan	Weimar Republic	Feature	
Kuhle Wampe oder Wem gehört die Welt? (To Whom Does the World Belong?)	1932	Slatan Dudow	Weimar Republic	Feature	
Misère au Borinage (Penury in the Borinage)	1934	Joris Ivens and Henri Storck	Belgium	Short documentary	
Triumph des Willens (Triumph of the Will)	1935	Leni Reifenstahl	Nazi Germany	Propaganda	
Der ewige Jude. Ein Filmbeitrag zum Weltjudentum (The Eternal Jew)	1940	Fritz Hippler	Nazi Germany	Propaganda	
Strange Victory	1948	Leo Hurwitz	East Germany	Documentary	
Salt of the Earth	1954	Herbert Biberman	United States	Feature	
Ernst Thälmann – Sohn seiner Klasse (Ernst Thälmann – Son of his Class)	1954	East Germany	Kurt Maetzig	Feature	
Ernst Thälmann – Führer seiner Klasse (Ernst Thälmann – Leader of his Class)	1955	East Germany	Kurt Maetzig	Feature	
On the Bowery	1956	Lionel Rogosin	United States	Docufiction	
No Love for Johnnie	1961	Ralph Thomas	United Kingdom	Feature	
The Mouse on the Moon	1963	Richard Lester	United Kingdom	Feature	
The Cool World	1964	Shirley Clarke	United States	Feature	
Obyknovennyy fashizm (Ordinary Fascism)	1965	Mikhail Romm	Soviet Union	Documentary	
La battaglia di Algeri (The Battle of Algiers)	1966	Gillo Pontecorvo	Italy / Algeria	Feature	
Terra em Transe (Entranced Earth)	1967	Glauber Rocha	Brazil	Feature	
La Chinoise, ou plutôt à la Chinoise: un film en train de se fair (The Chinese, or, rather, in the Chinese manner: a film in the making)	1967	Jean-Luc Godard	France	Feature	
Titicut Follies	1967	Frederick Wiseman	United States	Documentary	
La hora de los hornos (The Hour of the Furnaces)	1968	Fernando Solanas	Argentina	Feature	
In the Year of the Pig	1968	Emile de Antonio	United States	Documentary	
Teorema (Theorem)	1968	Pier Paolo Pasolini	Italy	Feature	
if....	1968	Lindsay Anderson	United Kingdom	Feature	
Z	1969	Costa-Gavras	Algeria / France	Feature	
Yawar Mallku (Blood of the Condor)	1969	Jorge Sanjinés	Bolivia	Feature	
Burn! (Queimada)	1969	Gillo Pontecorvo	Italy / France	Feature	
Salesman	1969	Albert and David Maysles; Charlotte Zwerin	United States	Documentary	
Indagine su un cittadino al di sopra di ogni sospetto (Investigation of a Citizen Above Suspicion)	1970	Elio Petri	Italy	Feature	
Le Chagrin et la Pitié (The Sorrow and the Pity)	1970	Marcel Ophüls	France; West Germany; Switzerland	Documentary	
Ghoroub wa Shorouq (Sunset and Sunrise)	1970	Kamal El Sheikh	Egypt	Feature	
Warum läuft Herr R. Amok? (Why Does Herr R. Run Amok?)	1970	Rainer Werner Fassbinder	West Germany	Feature	
Nicht der Homosexuelle ist pervers, sondern die Situation, in der er lebt (It Is Not the Homosexual Who Is Perverse, But the Society in Which He Lives)	1971	Rosa von Praunheim	Germany	Documentary	
Wanda	1971	Barbara Loden	United States	Feature	
La classe operaia va in paradiso (The Working Class Goes to Heaven)	1971	Elio Petri	Italy	Feature	
Μέρες του '36 (Days of '36)	1972	Theo Angelopoulos	Greece	Feature	
Il Caso Mattei (The Mattei Affair)	1972	Francesco Rosi	Italy	Feature	
Sambizanga	1972	Sarah Maldoror	Democratic Republic of the Congo	Feature	
La Société du Spectacle (The Society of the Spectacle)	1974	Guy Debord	France	Documentary	
Angst essen Seele auf (Ali: Fear Eats the Soul)	1974	Rainer Werner Fassbinder	West Germany	Feature	
Jeanne Dielman, 23 quai du Commerce, 1080 Bruxelles (Jeanne Dielman, 23 Commerce Quay, 1080 Brussels)	1975	Chantal Akerman	Belgium / France	Feature	
Karnak	1975	Ali Badrakhan	Egypt	Feature	
Salò o le 120 giornate di Sodoma (Salò, or the 120 Days of Sodom)	1975	Pier Paolo Pasolini	Italy / France	Feature	
All the President's Men	1976	Alan J. Pakula	United States	Feature	
Harlan County, USA	1976	Barbara Kopple	United States	Documentary	
Yarınsız Adam (The Man Without Tomorrow)	1977	Remzi Aydın Jöntürk	Turkey	Feature	
Satılmış Adam (The Sold Man)	1977	Remzi Aydın Jöntürk	Turkey	Feature	
Yıkılmayan Adam (The Indestructible Man)	1978	Remzi Aydın Jöntürk	Turkey	Feature	
Baara (Work)	1978	Souleymane Cissé	Mali	Feature	
Sürü (The Herd)	1978	Yılmaz Güney Zeki Ökten	Turkey	Feature	
Reds	1981	Warren Beatty	United States	Feature	
The Wave	1981	Alex Grasshoff	United States	Feature	
Missing	1982	Costa-Gavras	United States	Feature	
Yol (The Road)	1982	Şerif Gören; Yılmaz Güney	Turkey / Switzerland	Feature	
Duvar	1983	Yılmaz Güney	Turkey / France	Feature	
Before Stonewall: The Making of a Gay and Lesbian Community	1984	Greta Schiller	United States	Documentary	
Nineteen Eighty-Four	1984	Michael Radford	United Kingdom	Feature	
Shoah	1985	Claude Lanzmann	France	Documentary	
Camp de Thiaroye (The Camp of Thiaroye)	1988	Ousmane Sembene; Thierno Faty Sow	Senegal	Feature	
American Dream	1990	Barbara Kopple	United States; United Kingdom	Documentary	
JFK	1991	Oliver Stone	United States	Feature	
In the Name of the Father	1993	Jim Sheridan	United States	Feature	
Land and Freedom	1995	Ken Loach	United Kingdom; Spain; Germany; Italy; France	Feature	
Lumumba	2000	Raoul Peck	France; Germany; Belgium; Haiti	Feature	
Intimacy	2001	Patrice Chéreau	France; United Kingdom; Germany; Italy	Feature	
Jang Aur Aman (War and Peace)	2002	Anand Patwardhan	India	Documentary	
Gujarat: A Laboratory of Hindu Rashtra, Fascism	2003	Suma Josson	India	Documentary	
Fahrenheit 9/11	2004	Michael Moore	United States	Documentary	
Memoria del saqueo (Social Genocide)	2004	Fernando Solanas	Argentina	Documentary	
Darwin's Nightmare	2004	Hubert Sauper	Austria; France; Belgium	Documentary	
500 Years Later	2005	Owen Alik Shahadah	United Kingdom; United States	Documentary	
Syriana	2005	Stephen Gaghan	United States	Feature	
The Road to Guantánamo	2006	Michael Winterbottom; Mat Whitecross	United Kingdom	Docudrama	
The Last Communist	2006	Amir Muhammad	Malaysia	Documentary	
The Short Life of José Antonio Gutierrez	2006	Heidi Specogna	Switzerland	Documentary	
An Inconvenient Truth	2006	Davis Guggenheim	United States	Documentary	
Persepolis	2007	Marjane Satrapi; Vincent Paronnaud	France; Iran	Feature	
Unrepentant: Kevin Annett and Canada's Genocide	2006	Louie Lawless	Canada	Documentary	
Sicko	2007	Michael Moore	United States	Documentary	
What Would Jesus Buy	2007	Morgan Spurlock	United States	Documentary	
The World Without US	2008	Mitch Anderson and Jason J. Tomaric	United States	Documentary	
Religulous	2008	Larry Charles	United States	Documentary	
Milk	2008	Gus Van Sant	United States	Feature	
Capitalism: A Love Story	2009	Michael Moore	United States	Documentary	
American Radical: The Trials of Norman Finkelstein	2009	Nicolas Rossier; David Ridgen	United States	Documentary	
The Yes Men Fix the World	2009	Andy Bichlbaum; Mike Bonanno; Kurt Engfehr	United States	Documentary	
Motherland	2010	Owen Alik Shahadah	United States	Documentary	
The Black Power Mixtape 1967–1975	2011	Göran Hugo Olsson	Sweden	Documentary	
The Ides of March	2011	George Clooney	United States	Feature	
ToryBoy The Movie	2011	John Walsh	United Kingdom	Documentary	
2016: Obama's America	2012	Dinesh D'Souza	United States	Documentary	
No	2012	Pablo Larraín	Chile; France; United States	Feature	
The Pervert's Guide to Ideology	2012	Sophie Fiennes	United Kingdom	Documentary	
America: Imagine the World Without Her	2014	Dinesh D'Souza; John Sullivan	United States	Documentary	
Spotlight	2015	Tom McCarthy	United States	Feature	
Hillary's America: The Secret History of the Democratic Party	2017	Dinesh D'Souza; Bruce Schooley	United States	Documentary	
The Death of Stalin	2017	Armando Iannucci	United Kingdom; France; Belgium	Feature	
Death of a Nation	2018	Dinesh D'Souza; Bruce Schooley	United States	Documentary	
Fahrenheit 11/9	2018	Michael Moore	United States	Documentary	
Vice	2018	Adam McKay	United States	Feature	
Friend of the World	2020	Brian Patrick Butler	United States	Feature	
The Hunt	2020	Craig Zobel	United States	Feature	
Infidel	2020	Cyrus Nowrasteh	United States	Feature	
Trump Card	2020	Dinesh D'Souza; Debbie D'Souza; Bruce Schooley	United States	Documentary	
Absolute Proof	2021	Brannon Howse; Mike Lindell	United States	Documentary	
Don't Look Up	2021	Adam McKay	United States	Feature	
Alice, through the Looking	2021	Adam Donen	United Kingdom Germany	Feature	
2000 Mules	2022	Dinesh D'Souza	United States	Documentary	
Hemet, or the Landlady Don't Drink Tea	2023	Tony Olmos	United States	Feature	
Adamya	2026	Ranjan Ghosh	India	Feature	

== See also ==
- Political films category
- Cultural industry
- African cinema
- Documentary film
- List of films dealing with Anarchism
- Social criticism
- Women's cinema
