= Kıskıvrak =

- Directed by: Halit Refiğ
- Written by: Erdoğan Tünaş
- Produced by: Türker İnanoğlu
- Starring: Tarık Akan, Gülsen Bubikoglu, and Korhan Abay
- Production company: Erler Film
- Release date: 1986
- Country: Turkey
- Language: Turkish

Kıskıvrak is a 1986 Turkish adventure film, directed by Halit Refiğ and starring Tarık Akan, Gülsen Bubikoglu, and Korhan Abay.
