= Kızım Ve Ben =

- Directed by: Halit Refiğ
- Written by: Erdoğan Tünaş, Safa Önal
- Produced by: Türker İnanoğlu
- Starring: Gülsen Bubikoglu, Cüneyt Arkın, and Yilmaz Zafer
- Cinematography: Çetin Gürtöp
- Production company: Erler Film
- Release date: 1988
- Running time: 122 minutes
- Country: Turkey
- Language: Turkish

Kızım Ve Ben is a 1988 Turkish drama film, directed by Halit Refiğ and starring Gülsen Bubikoglu, Cüneyt Arkın, and Yilmaz Zafer.

== Cast ==
- Gülşen Bubikoğlu - Reyhan Olcay
- Cüneyt Arkın - Vedat Olcay
- Nilüfer Öz - Çağla Olcay
- Yılmaz Zafer - Cem Taner
- Kerem Yılmazer
- Cem Erman
- Devrim Parscan
- Bülent Ufuk
- Faruk Savun
- Yavuz Karakaş
- Mesut Sürmeli
- Ali Demirel
- Nuri Tuğ
- Zeki Sezer
- Orhan Elmas
- Gülten Ceylan
- Mehmet Uğur
- Akif Kilman
- Cihan Alp
