= Alev Alev =

Alev Alev may refer to:

- Alev Alev (TV series), a Turkish drama television series
- Alev Alev (film), a 1984 Turkish action film
