= Barbara Nadel =

English crime-writer

- Born: London, England, United Kingdom
- Occupation: Author
- Writing career
- Years active: 1999–present
- Genres: crime; mystery; police procedural; historical fiction
- Notable works: Inspector İkmen; Francis Hancock; Hakim and Arnold

Barbara Nadel is an English crime and historical fiction author and former healthcare professional. She is best known for her Inspector İkmen series of novels set in Istanbul, Turkey, and her Francis Hancock series set in the East End of London. She has also written the Hakim and Arnold and the Ten Bells Street series, the latter under the pen name Mary Collins.

== Early life ==
Nadel was born and raised in the East End of London in the 1960s. Her father lived through World War II and witnessed The Blitz in the early 1940s. As a child, she wanted to be an Egyptologist.

Nadel trained as an actor before becoming a writer. She worked as a public relations officer for the National Schizophrenia Fellowship's Good Companion Service and as a mental health advocate for people with mental disorders in a psychiatric hospital. She also worked with sexually abused teenagers and taught psychology in schools and colleges. She was the patron of The Acorn Group in Shrewsbury a charity that cared for those in emotional and mental distress.

== Career ==
Nadel tried to publish her first novel in 1992 but was unsuccessful. In 1999, she contacted the Julie Burton Literary Agency and signed with them. Nadel then signed a three-book contract with Hodder Headline, with her debut novel Belshazzar's Daughter being published that year.

Her Inspector İkmen series follow Çetin İkmen, a detective on the Istanbul police force, and his colleague Mehmet Süleyman.

Her Francis Hancock series, set in West Ham during The Blitz, follows undertaker Francis Hancock. The first novel Last Rights was published in 2005. With this second series, Nadel became a full-time professional writer in 2006.

In 2011, Quercus signed Nadel to write a new crime series set in the modern-day East End of London which was to be published starting in summer 2012 under the pen name B J Nadel. The book, A Private Business, was ultimately credited to Barbara Nadel when published. The series follows private investigator Lee Arnold and his British Bangladeshi assistant Mumtaz Hakim. The series' publication moved to Allison & Busby starting with the fifth book.

Nadel's other published works include short stories in Ellery Queen's Mystery Magazine, My Weekly, and Woman's Own, as well as travel pieces for The Guardian, The Sunday Times, The Independent, and Saveur.

== Personal life ==
Barbara Nadel is married and has one adult son who is a comic book writer, as well as one grandson who was born in 2016. She quit drinking alcohol. Since November 2014, Nadel and her husband have resided in Essex in the East of England. The couple previously lived in Lancashire in North West England. She is a regular visitor to Turkey.

== Awards ==
Year	Award	Category	Nominees	Result
2005	Crime Writers' Association's; Silver Dagger		Deadly Web (from Inspector İkmen, book #7)	Won
2006	Jury magazine's Flintyxan ("Flint Axe")	Best Historical Crime Novel	Dödlig rättvisa, Marianne Alstermark's Swedish translation of Last Rights (from Francis Hancock, book #1)	Won
2007	Crime Writers' Association's; Dagger in the Library		Herself	Nominated
2007	Theakston's Old Peculier Crime Novel of the Year Award		Dance with Death (from Inspector İkmen, book #8)	Nominated
2008	Redbridge Libraries'; Big Red Read Awards	Book of the Year	Ashes to Ashes (from Francis Hancock, book #3)	Won
2010	Redbridge Libraries'; Big Red Read Awards	Crime Fiction of the Year	Sure and Certain Death (from Francis Hancock, book #4)	Won
2013	Short Mystery Fiction Society's; Derringer Award	Best short story	"Nain Rouge" (from Ellery Queen's Mystery Magazine, August 2012)	Nominated

== Bibliography ==
=== Inspector İkmen ===
Published by Headline

1. Belshazzar's Daughter (1999)
2. A Chemical Prison (AKA The Ottoman Cage) (2000)
3. Arabesk (2001)
4. Deep Waters (2002)
5. Harem (2003)
6. Petrified (2004)
7. Deadly Web (2005)
8. Dance With Death (2006)
9. A Passion for Killing (2007)
10. Pretty Dead Things (2007)
11. River of the Dead (2009)
12. Death by Design (2010)
13. A Noble Killing (2011)
14. Dead of Night (2012)
15. Deadline (2013)
16. Body Count (2014)
17. Land of the Blind (2015)
18. On the Bone (2016)
19. The House of Four (2017)
20. Incorruptible (2018)
21. A Knife to the Heart (2019)
22. Blood Business (2020)
23. Forfeit (2021)
24. Bride Price (2022)
25. Double Illlusion (2023)
26. The Darkest Night (2024)
27. The Wooden Library (2025)
28. Serpent's Tongue (2026)
29. The Fragrance of Death (2027)

=== Francis Hancock ===
Published by Headline

1. Last Rights (2005)
2. After the Mourning (2006)
3. Ashes to Ashes (2008)
4. Sure and Certain Death (2009)

=== Hakim and Arnold ===
Published by Quercus

1. A Private Business (2012)
2. An Act of Kindness (2013)
3. Poisoned Ground (2014)
4. Enough Rope (2015)

Published by Allison & Busby

5. Bright Shiny Things (2017)
6. Displaced (2018)
7. A Time to Die (2020)
8. Web of Lies (2022)
9. The East Ham Golem (2026)
1. A Good Death (2027)

=== Ten Bells Street (written as Mary Collins) ===
Published by Piatkus

1. Ten Bells Street (2019)
2. Ten Bells Street at War (2019)
3. Victory on Ten Bells Street (2020)

=== Other books ===
1. Back to the Future (2012)

== Adaptation ==
In June 2020, it was announced that Miramax TV and ViacomCBS International Studios would produce a television adaptation of the Çetin İkmen novels entitled The Turkish Detective.

By April 2022, the project was greenlit for a full series of eight episodes, to be released on Paramount+. The series is written by Ben Schiffer, and directed by Niels Arden Oplev. Haluk Bilginer stars as İkmen, alongside Ethan Kai as Mehmet Süleyman and Yasemin Allen as Ayşe Farsakoğlu. The series was released in September 2023.

The series aired in the UK on BBC Two and BBC iPlayer.
