= Malkoçoğlu Cem Sultan =

- Directed by: Remzi Aydın Jöntürk, Hassan Sasanpour (Iranian version)
- Written by: Bülent Oran; Remzi Aydın Jöntürk
- Produced by: Naci Duru, Mehdi Missaghieh
- Starring: Cüneyt Arkın; Pouri Banayi; Feri Cansel; Cihangir Ghaffari
- Cinematography: Ali Uğur
- Production companies: Duru Film, Misaghye Studio
- Release dates: 1970 (Turkey); 1972 (Iran)
- Running time: 82 minutes
- Countries: Turkey, Iran
- Languages: Turkish, Persian

Malkoçoğlu Cem Sultan (Persian: سرزمین دلاوران(Sarzamīn-e Delāvarān) is a Turkish historical action film by Remzi Aydın Jöntürk and Hassan Sasanpour. It is one of the numerous collaborations between the famous actor Cüneyt Arkın and Jöntürk. The film belongs to the wave of historical films in the Turkish cinema. The film is about the beloved comics character of Ayhan Başoğlu, Malkoçoğlu. The film was shot simultaneously in Turkish and in Persian. The Iranian version was released as Serzemin-e Delaveran in 1972.

The main features of the movie has real historical basis as Malkoçoğlu was regarded as one of the loyal Akıncı families of the Ottoman Empire. The film is the dramatization of Başoğlu's comic book of the same name and tells the story of the life struggle of Cem Sultan and how Akıncıs help him. The leader of the Akıncı troops, Malkoçoğlu, trusts a peasant, Polat, and accepts him into his army and gives him the mission to safely guide Cem Sultan to his Frenk allies. Cüneyt Arkın portrays two characters in the film, as a part of his trademark style.

== Plot ==
Malkoçoğlu Ali Bey was captured by Homer during one of his campaigns and tortured for years in a dungeon. Eventually, he manages to get away. He continues his life as a cavalry leader on horseback while being cut off from his cherished wife and his unidentified son Polat. The father and son, who are strangers, are brought together by his son's ambition to become a cavalryman. They are tasked with keeping Cem Sultan, the blood brother of Malkoçoğlu Ali Bey and the son of Fatih Sultan Mehmet, out of the Venetians' grasp. Malkoçoğlu Ali Bey, the son of renowned raider Malkoçoğlu Bali Bey, is the subject of this film. He attended the Enderun-ı Hümayün, a palace university established by Fatih Sultan Mehmed Han. He was martyred in the Battle of Çaldıran in 1514 while serving as governor of Sofia.

== Cast ==
- Cüneyt Arkın as Polat / Malkoçoğlu Ali bey as Polat's father (Dual role)
- Pouri Banayi as Melek (credited as Gülnaz Huri)
- Cihangir Ghaffari as Cem Sultan
- Feri Cansel as Jitan
- Suzan Avcı as Zühre
- Behçet Nacar as Gaddar Hamolka
- Özdemir Han as Şeytan Omerro
- Ayton Sert as Hancı İgor
- Aytekin Akkaya as Raider
- Günay Güner as Raider
- Adnan Mersinli as Öküz Abdi
- Tarık Şimşek as Omerro's henchman

== Political aspect of the film ==
Illustrating the class differences in society during the mid-Ottoman era is one of the key elements of the film. Poor peasant Polat has to kill a wealthy landlord because he tries to take Polat's lover away from him by stating that a peasant even doesn't have the right to talk to such an influential person. This depiction is a classic of Remzi Jöntürk films, even for the action-based ones, frequently emphasizing on class struggles in society. The film also has references to the medieval understanding of honor and how it was, in some cases, more significant than state affairs.
