= Paramparça (film) =

- Directed by: Halit Refiğ
- Written by: Erdoğan Tünaş
- Produced by: Türker İnanoğlu
- Starring: Tarik Akan, Gülsen Bubikoglu, and Cüneyt Arkın
- Production company: Erler Film
- Release date: April 30, 1985
- Country: Turkey
- Language: Turkish

Paramparça is a 1985 Turkish action film, directed by Halit Refiğ and starring Tarik Akan, Gülsen Bubikoglu, and Cüneyt Arkın.
