= İhtiras Fırtınası =

- Directed by: Halit Refiğ
- Starring: Gülsen Bubikoglu, Cihan Ünal, and Zuhal Olcay
- Release date: 1983
- Country: Turkey
- Language: Turkish

İhtiras Fırtınası is a 1983 Turkish romantic drama film, directed by Halit Refiğ and starring Gülsen Bubikoglu, Cihan Ünal, and Zuhal Olcay.

== Cast ==
- Gülsen Bubikoglu as Seref
- Cihan Ünal as Feyyaz
- Zuhal Olcay (credited as Zühal Olcay) as Müjgan
- Raik Alniaçik as Hasim
- Haluk Kurtoglu as Recai Bey
- Diler Saraç as Recai Bey'in Karisi
- Renan Fosforoglu as Doktor
- Necip Tekçe as General
- Ihsan Gedik as Hasim'in Adami

Others

- Mary March
- Damla Ira
- Muhtesem Durukan
- Zeki Alpan
- Eren Erenci
- Cevdet Balikçi
