= Alev Alev (film) =

- Directed by: Halit Refiğ
- Written by: Erdoğan Tünaş
- Produced by: Türker İnanoğlu
- Starring: Tarık Akan; Gülşen Bubikoğlu; Cüneyt Arkın
- Cinematography: Çetin Gürtop
- Music by: İzzet Öz
- Production company: Erler Film
- Release date: 1984
- Running time: 118 min
- Country: Turkey
- Language: Turkish

Alev Alev is a 1984 Turkish action film, directed by Halit Refiğ and starring Tarık Akan, Gülşen Bubikoğlu, and Cüneyt Arkın.

== Cast ==
- Cüneyt Arkın
- Gülşen Bubikoğlu
- Tarık Akan
- Çiğdem Tunç
- Hulusi Kentmen
- Sevda Aktolga
- Şemsi İnkaya
- Turgut Boralı
- Tevhit Bilge
- Nevzat Okçugil
