= O Kadın =

- Directed by: Halit Refiğ
- Starring: Gülsen Bubikoglu, Cihan Ünal, and Arsen Gürzap
- Release date: 1982
- Country: Türkiye
- Language: Turkish

O Kadın is a 1982 Turkish romantic drama film, directed by Halit Refiğ and starring Gülsen Bubikoglu, Cihan Ünal, and Arsen Gürzap.
