= Paramparça =

Paramparça may refer to:

- Paramparça (film), a 1985 Turkish action film
- Paramparça (TV series), a 2014–2017 Turkish soap opera
