= Hıdır =

Hıdır or Hidir is a masculine given name. Notable people with the name include:

- Hıdır Aslan (1958–1984), Turkish rebel
- Hıdır Gürel (1920–1976), Turkish poet
- Hidir Lutfi (1880–1959), Iraqi poet
