= Deadly Web =

2005 detective novel by Barbara Nadel

- Author: Barbara Nadel
- Language: English
- Publication date: 2005
- Publication place: United Kingdom

Deadly Web is a detective novel by English crime writer Barbara Nadel. Set in Turkey, it is one of a series that features Istanbul police inspector Çetin İkmen. It was the last novel to win the CWA Silver Dagger in 2005, as the award was abolished in 2006.
