= Suna Yıldızoğlu =

Turkish actress

- Born: Sonja Eady; 26 February 1955 (age 71); Bournemouth, England
- Occupations: Actress, singer
- Years active: 1977–present
- Spouses: Kayhan Yıldızoğlu (m. 1976; div. 1978) Dudley Allen (m. 1988; div. 2007)
- Partner: Çetin Alp (1978–1986)
- Children: Yasemin Allen; Kaan Allen

Suna Yıldızoğlu (born Sonja Eady on 26 February 1955) is an English-Turkish actress and singer, based in Turkey.

Her parents divorced when she was 18. She has six brothers. Since primary school, she showed interest in theatre and dancing and at the age of 11 began acting on stage. An English national, Yıldızoğlu moved to Turkey in 1974. Upon marrying actor Kayhan Yıldızoğlu, she changed her surname and acquired Turkish citizenship. She graduated from French, Spanish, German Languages of Literature. She made her debut in Cinema of Turkey in 1977 with a leading role in Yıkılmayan Adam alongside Cüneyt Arkın. In 1981, she was a contestant at the 17th Golden Orpheus Acting Contest and won the Özel Burgaz Award and Journalists Award. She further rose to prominence by acting alongside Zeki Alasya and Metin Akpınar in Petrol Kralları, and with Kemal Sunal in Gol Kralı.

From her marriage to Dudley Allen, she has two children: Yasemin Kay Allen and Dyon Kaan Allen. In 2000, she went on a hiatus when she moved to Australia for her children to study abroad.

== Filmography ==
- Çukur – 2020
- Söz – 2018
- 46 Yok Olan – 2016
- Yerden Yüksek
- Elif – 2008
- Eşref Saati – 2007
- Eskici Baba – 2000
- Küçük Besleme – 1999
- Yalan – 1997
- Sara ile Musa – 1996
- Sevda Kondu – 1996
- Sokaktaki Adam – 1995
- Sevgili Ortak – 1993
- Bizim Takım – 1993
- Kopuk Dünyalar – 1992
- Yaralı Can – 1987
- Biraz Neşe Biraz Keder – 1986
- Tarzan Rıfkı – 1986
- Nokta İle Virgül Deh Deh Düldül – 1985
- Şaşkın Gelin – 1984
- Ömrümün Tek Gecesi – 1984
- Kürtaj – 1981
- Uyanık Aptallar – 1981
- Kurban Olduğum – 1980
- Kul Sevdası – 1980
- Akıllı Deliler – 1980
- Gol Kralı – 1980
- Nokta İle Virgül Paldır Küldür – 1979
- Aşk Ve Adalet – 1978
- Seven Unutmaz – 1978
- Petrol Kralları – 1978
- Güneşli Bataklık – 1977
- Bir Adam Yaratmak – 1977
- Garip – 1977
- Şıpsevdi – 1977
- Bir Yürek Satıldı – 1977
- Kan – 1977
- Yıkılmayan Adam – 1977

== Discography ==
- Do You Think I'm Sexy / I'm Gonna Dance (1981)
- Son Olsun / Sonsuz Aşk (with Çetin Alp) (1981)
- Türküler Türkülerimiz / Avrasya (1991)
- 46 Yok Olan (2016)

== Awards ==
- 1981: Golden Orpheus Contest – Jury Special Award
- 1996: 18th SİYAD Turkish Cinema Awards – Best Actress (Sokaktaki Adam)
