= The Turkish Detective =

Crime drama television series

- Genre: Crime drama
- Based on: Çetin İkmen by Barbara Nadel
- Written by: Ben Schiffer; Neil Biswas; Caroline Henry; Raymond Khoury
- Directed by: Niels Arden Oplev; Lynsey Miller; Nisan Dag
- Starring: Haluk Bilginer; Yasemin Allen; Ethan Kai
- Countries of origin: United States; Turkey
- Original language: English
- No. of series: 1
- No. of episodes: 8

Production
- Executive producers: Kerem Çatay; Claire Sowerby-A Sheppard; Marc Helwig; Ben Schiffer
- Producers: Charles Croft; Emrah Gamsizoglu; Marina Niel
- Production companies: Miramax; Ay Yapim; Paramount Television International Studios

Original release
- Network: Paramount+
- Release: September 15 – November 3, 2023

The Turkish Detective is an American-British-Turkish crime drama television series, adapted from Barbara Nadel's Çetin İkmen book series.

== Premise ==
Turkish-born, British-raised police officer Mehmet Süleyman transfers from London to Istanbul to join Inspector Çetin İkmen's team.

== Cast and characters ==
- Haluk Bilginer as Inspector Çetin İkmen
- Yasemin Allen as Detective Ayşe Farsakoğlu
- Ethan Kai as Detective Mehmet Süleyman
- Erol Afsin as Tarik Sanver
- Deniz Ülkü as Cicek İkmen
- Uygar Tamer as Fatma İkmen
- Dilan Gwyn as Leyla Pamuk
- Selma Ergeç as Selma Payidar
- Diyar Bozkurt as Izzet Melik

== Production ==
In June 2020, it was announced that Miramax TV and ViacomCBS International Studios would produce a television adaptation of the 21 Çetin İkmen novels entitled The Turkish Detective by Barbara Nadel. By April 2022, Turkish company Ay Yapim were co-producers and the eight part series had Niels Arden Oplev as director. The series is adapted by Ben Schiffer. Filming took place in Istanbul.

The cast is led by Haluk Bilginer as Inspector Çetin İkmen and also includes Yasemin Kay Allen, Ethan Kai, Dilan Gwyn and Selma Ergeç.

== Broadcast ==
The series was broadcast in Greece on Cosmote TV Series from 15 September 2023. The series was broadcast in the UK on BBC Two from 7 July 2024.

== Episodes ==
No.	Title	Directed by	Written by	Original release date
1	"Episode 1- Detective Mehmet Süleyman arrives in Istanbul from England to join Superintendent Çetin İkmen's team. Their first case involves the murder of a university student found dead in a cemetery, marking Mehmet's initiation into Istanbul's homicide investigations."	Niels Arden Oplev	Ben Schiffer	15 September 2023
2	"Episode 2- Suspicious messages on the victim Gözde's phone lead the team to her secret boyfriend, Kemal. As they interrogate him, new information points them toward another suspect, expanding the scope of the investigation."	Niels Arden Oplev	Ben Schiffer	22 September 2023
3	"Episode 3- The public murder of music manager Demir, linked to one of Istanbul's most successful families, initially seems connected to his business dealings. Meanwhile, Mehmet Süleyman reconnects with his father, Abdel, adding a personal dimension to the unfolding events."	Lynsey Miller	Raymond Khoury & Neil Biswas	29 September 2023
4	"Episode 4- Inspector Çetin İkmen is given 24 hours to identify the killer of Demir Karagül, the son of a wealthy businessman. Convinced that either Dillon or Cem is responsible, the investigation intensifies. Meanwhile, Mehmet Süleyman and Kemal take Leyla back to her old apartment, where they discover a USB memory stick that could provide crucial information about the case."	Lynsey Miller	Raymond Khoury & Neil Biswas	6 October 2023
5	"Episode 5- With İkmen on paternity leave, Ayşe leads an investigation into the death of a garbage collector in a poor neighborhood of Istanbul. As the case unfolds, it becomes evident that a serial killer is targeting garbage collectors. Mehmet Süleyman assists in the investigation and finally shares a long-held secret with Ayşe, deepening their professional relationship."	Nisan Dag	Caroline Henry	13 October 2023
6	"Episode 6- Mehmet Süleyman goes undercover as a garbage collector to get closer to the remaining suspects in the serial killings. Meanwhile, Ayşe continues the Leyla case in his absence and seeks information from one of Istanbul's notorious drug smugglers. İkmen, contemplating his growing family, considers seeking a promotion."	Nisan Dag	Caroline Henry	20 October 2023
7	"Episode 7- Following İkmen's promotion, Mehmet Süleyman and Ayşe are dispatched to investigate what appears to be an accidental house fire. However, Süleyman quickly realizes that the fire was deliberately set. Their investigation is unexpectedly hindered by their new superior—İkmen himself—who blocks their efforts to delve deeper into the case."	Lynsey Miller	Ben Schiffer	27 October 2023
8	"Episode 8- The team finally uncovers the mastermind behind the Kayra Khan operation. Bringing this individual to justice proves challenging, testing the resolve and unity of the investigative team."	Lynsey Miller	Ben Schiffer	3 November 2023
