= Yarınsız Adam =

- Theatrical poster
- Directed by: Remzi Aydın Jöntürk
- Written by: Mehmet Aydın
- Produced by: Deniz Kalkavan
- Starring: Cüneyt Arkın; Betül Aşçıoğlu; Bilal İnci; Macit Flordun
- Release date: 1976
- Running time: 84 min
- Country: Turkey
- Language: Turkish

Yarınsız Adam is a Turkish political film by Remzi Aydın Jöntürk, the first in his trilogy. It was succeeded by Satılmış Adam (Sold Man) and Yıkılmayan Adam (Indestructible Man), both filmed in 1977. The film is about the story of Murat, portrayed by Cüneyt Arkın. Murat helps his friend, Kemal, when they are escaping from the police because they steal to survive. This help costs Murat badly and he is sent to prison. During the runtime of the film, viewers see the world from the eyes of a criminal, who lived his childhood in poverty, and understand the gap between the rich and poor in Turkey.

Just like the themes of the other political films of Jöntürk, there is a socialist message, an attribution to the inequality of the system. Jöntürk prefers to do it rather sharply in some scenes of the film. For example, the poor little boy that gets in the car of Murat directly states that the rich and the poor can't be friends because wealthy people can't understand the feelings of poor people.

== Cast ==
- Cüneyt Arkın ... Murat Demir
  - Levent İnanır ... young Murat
- Betül Aşçıoğlu ... Zeliş
- Bilal İnci ... Baba
- Macit Flordun ... Kemal
  - Ömer Kahraman ... young Kemal
- Orhan Alkan ... Danışman
- İhsan Baysal ... Murat's driver Kemal
- Yüksel Gözen ... Akif Danaoğlu
- Mine Sun ... Kemal's wife
- Kahraman Kral ... Ferhat
- Yusuf Çetin ...

== Characters ==
- Murat - a man who gained success in the criminal world, without wanting to be a part of it.
- Kemal - Murat's childhood friend who later becomes the primary school teacher of their town.
- Zeliş - Murat's sister. Later becomes a prostitute because she can't find another job.
- Baba - a mafia leader who meets with young Murat in prison. He wants to gain his old power with the help of him.
- Danışman - business advisor of Baba, who later betrays Murat.
