= Gülşen Bubikoğlu =

Turkish actress (born 1954)

- Born: 5 December 1954 (age 71); Istanbul, Turkey
- Education: Fatih Girls High School
- Occupation: Actress
- Years active: 1973–2004
- Spouse: Türker İnanoğlu (m. 1974; died 2024)
- Children: 1
- Website: http://www.gulsenbubikoglu.info/

Gülşen Bubikoğlu (born 5 December 1954) is a Turkish actress, one of the leading ladies of Turkish cinema in the 1970s and into the early 1980s. Her sister is actress Nilgün Bubikoğlu, and her daughter, Zeynep İnanoğlu, is an inventor. She studied at Fatih Kız Lisesi and was a fashion model for a time. Her first leading role was in Yaban in 1973. She and Tarik Akan formed one of the most recognised couples on the screen in the Turkish film history having acted in many romantic comedies together. She starred in many films of famous director Türker İnanoğlu, whom she married later.

== Filmography ==
Year	Film	Role	Nots
1973	Yaban	Alev Özkan	
1973	Bitirimler Sosyetede	Peri	
1974	Mahçup Delikanlı	Sema Akgünlü	
1974	Yüz Liraya Evlenilmez	Gülşen	
1974	Cici Kız	Ayşim Somer	
1974	Reisin Kızı	Gülten	
1974	Ayrı Dünyalar	Aslı	
1974	Yaz Bekarı	Leyla Güneş	
1975	Şafakta Buluşalım	Gülben	
1975	Üç Kağıtçılar	Cemile	Bilingual film
1975	Ah Nerede	Zehra	
1975	Ah Bu Gençlik	Cemile	
1975	Evcilik Oyunu	Nazlı	
1976	Kader Bağlayınca	Zeynep	
1976	Sıralardaki Heyecan	Gülşen	
1976	Ne Umduk Ne Bulduk	Zeynep	
1976	Baş Belası	Ayşe	
1977	Ölmeyen Şarkı	Çiğdem	
1977	Bizim Kız	Zeynep Arda	
1978	İşte Bizim Hikayemiz	Sevgi	
1978	Vahşi Gelin	Necmiye	
1979	Mücevher Hırsızları	Sincap Yasemin	
1979	Canikom	Bahar	
1980	Renkli Dünya	Zeynep Demir	
1980	Tanrı'ya Feryat	Selda	
1981	Gırgıriyede Şenlik Var		
1981	Gırgıriye		
1982	Görgüsüzler	Gül	
1982	Leyla İle Mecnun	Leyla	
1982	O Kadın	Gönül	
1982	Kördüğüm	Gülşen	
1983	Gırgıriyede Cümbüş Var	Gülliye	
1983	İhtiras Fırtınası	Şeref	
1984	Gırgıriyede Büyük Seçim	Gülliye	
1984	Alev Alev	Alev	
1985	Paramparça	Ümran Koçer	
1986	Savunma	Handan Çelik	
1986	Kıskıvrak	Reyhan	
1988	Kurtar Beni	Ayten	Antalya Golden Orange Film Festival
1988	Kızım ve Ben / Gurbet Kadını	Reyhan Olcay	
1989	Suçlu	Fatma Kara	
1989	Dehşet Gecesi		
1990	Madde 438	Naciye Tuna	
1993	Zirvedekiler	Zeynep	
1998	Affet Bizi Hocam	Zeynep	

Awards
Preceded by Türkan Şoray	Golden Orange Award for Best Actress; 1988 for Kurtar Beni	Succeeded by Nur Sürer
