= Leyla İle Mecnun =

- Directed by: Halit Refiğ
- Starring: Orhan Gencebay, Gülsen Bubikoglu, and Raik Alniaçik
- Release date: 1982
- Country: Turkey
- Language: Turkish

Leyla İle Mecnun is a 1982 Turkish romantic drama film, directed by Halit Refiğ and starring Orhan Gencebay, Gülsen Bubikoglu, and Raik Alniaçik.
