= İstanbul'un Kızları =

- Poster
- Directed by: Halit Refiğ
- Screenplay by: Bülent Oran, Halit Refiğ
- Produced by: Halit Refiğ
- Starring: Cüneyt Arkın; Nilüfer Aydan; Handan Adali
- Edited by: Özdemir Arıtan
- Production companies: Uğur Film, Nil-Ay Film
- Release date: 1964
- Country: Turkey
- Language: Turkish

İstanbul'un Kızları is a 1964 Turkish crime drama film, directed by Halit Refiğ and starring Cüneyt Arkın, Nilüfer Aydan, and Handan Adali.

== Cast ==
- Cüneyt Arkın
- Nilüfer Aydan
- Sevda Ferdağ
- Haldan Adali
- Önder Somer
- Selma Güneri
- Hayati Hamzaoğlu
- Meral Sayın
- Suphi Tekniker
- Gürel Ünlüsoy
- Memduh Ün
