= Kurtar Beni =

- Directed by: Halit Refiğ
- Starring: Gülsen Bubikoglu, Talat Bulut, and Tanju Gürsu
- Release date: 1987
- Country: Turkey
- Language: Turkish

Kurtar Beni is a 1987 Turkish romantic drama film, directed by Halit Refiğ and starring Gülsen Bubikoglu, Talat Bulut, and Tanju Gürsu.
