= Canım Sana Feda =

- Directed by: Halit Refiğ
- Starring: Cüneyt Arkın; Nilüfer Aydan; Muzaffer Tema
- Release date: 1965
- Country: Turkey
- Language: Turkish

Canım Sana Feda is a 1965 Turkish romantic drama film, directed by Halit Refiğ and starring Cüneyt Arkın, Nilüfer Aydan, and Muzaffer Tema.

== Cast ==
- Cüneyt Arkın as Ahmet
- Nilüfer Aydan as Türkan Ateş
- Muzaffer Tema
- Esen Püsküllü
- Tuncer Necmioğlu
- Nusret Özkaya
- Hüseyin Demir
- Cevdet Balıkçı
- Behçet Nacar
- İsmet Erten
- Muammer Gözalan
