= Hidir Lutfi =

Iraqi poet

- خضر لطفي
- Born: 1880; Kirkuk, Ottoman Iraq
- Died: June 23, 1959 (aged 78–79); Kirkuk, Iraq
- Occupation: poet

Hidir Lutfi (1880 – 23 June 1959) was an Iraqi poet. Born in Kirkuk in a Konyan Turkish family, he studied Arabic, Persian and Turkish. He has an unprinted Diwan of poetry, many literary researches, and a book on the history of Kirkuk. He died in his hometown and was buried there.
