= Kazım Kartal =

Turkish actor

- Born: April 28, 1936; Altunhisar, Niğde, Turkey
- Died: August 13, 2003 (aged 67); Istanbul, Turkey
- Other names: Kazım Dilcan
- Occupation: Actor
- Years active: 1958–2003

Kazim Kartal (April 28, 1936 – August 13, 2003) was a Turkish film and television actor.

== Biography ==
Kazım Kartal was a prolific yet relatively unknown figure in Turkish cinema. He began his acting career in 1964 and appeared in nearly 1,000 films, of which around 350 have been documented. In addition to acting, Kartal wrote two screenplays and directed a film.

Following an illness in Hınıs, he returned to Istanbul, where he died from a heart attack.

== Filmography ==
- Toprağa Kan Düştü – 2003
- Kirve – 2003
- Seni Yaşatacağım – 2002
- Derman Bey – 2001
- O Benim Karımdı – 2001
- Nasibim – 2001
- Dava / Doz – 2001
- Şişman ile Pişman – 2001
- Üvey Baba – 2000
- Kimsecikler – 1999
- Şahin – 1999
- Ölüm Yolu – 1999
- Sokakların Yasası – 1998
- Cinayet Var – 1998
- Yalnızlık Şarkısı – 1997
- Günaydın Geceyarısı – 1997
- Sevimli Dostlar – 1997
- Böyle mi Olacaktı – 1997
- Fırat – 1997
- Drejan – 1996
- Sevda – 1996
- Acı Ve Tatlı Günler – 1996
- Ekmek – 1996
- Kızım ve Ben – 1996
- Tel Örgü – 1995
- Yahya Kaptan – 1995
- Huzura Giden Yol – 1995
- Ölüm Peşimizde – 1994
- Ölümden Acı – 1994
- Sevgi Kuşları – 1994
- Şöhretin Bedeli – 1994
- İslam Adalettir – 1994
- Adı Osman – 1994
- Sessiz Çığlık – 1994
- Kurtlar Sofrası – 1994
- Ağlama Sevgilim – 1993
- Kızılırmak Karakoyun – 1993
- Gelincik Tarlası – 1993
- Güneşi Uyandırmadan – 1993
- Arayış – 1993
- Deli Balta – 1993
- Ben Anayım – 1992
- Beyaz Umutlar – 1992
- Gündüzün Karanlığı -1992
- Tatar Ramazan Sürgünde – 1992
- Kurdoğlu-2 / Sancağın Ordusu – 1992
- Can mı Dayanır – 1991
- Tanrı Şahidimdir – 1991
- Ula Ula Niyazi – 1991
- Ölümü Yaşamak – 1991
- Ecelin Gölgesinde – 1991
- Siyabend-ü Xece – 1991
- Polis Görev Başında – 1990
- Fedai – 1990
- Tatar Ramazan – 1990
- Kabadayılar Kralı – 1990
- Kan Çiçeği – 1989
- Atlı Karınca – 1989
- Bir Aşk Yeter – 1989
- Kınalı Hanzo – 1989
- Gülom – 1989
- Toprağın Gücü – 1988
- Acılar −1988
- Ponente Feneri −1988
- Can Borcu / Nar Kırmızı -1988
- Alman Avrat 40 Bin Mark −1988
- Asılacak Adam −1987
- Sürgündeki Adam −1987
- Hazreti Ayşe −1987
- Arkadaşım ve Ben – 1987
- Çakırcalı Mehmet Efe – 1987
- Efeler Diyarı – 1987
- Işıkta Kaybolanlar – 1987
- Oyunun Kuralı – 1987
- Suçsuz – 1987
- Şanssızım – 1987
- Kuruluş / Osmancık – 1987
- Umut Sokağı – 1986
- Ben Milyoner Değilim – 1986
- Kanlı Su – 1986
- Garip (2) – 1986
- Hekimoğlu – 1986
- Kader Böyle İstedi – 1986
- Manyak – 1986
- Sevdan Öldürdü Beni – 1986
- Seher Vakti – 1986
- Alkol – 1985
- Altar – 1985
- Acı Sevda – 1985
- Eroin Hattı – 1985
- Gözlerden Kalbe – 1985
- Suskun Duvarlar – 1985
- Nokta İle Virgül Deh Deh Düldül – 1985
- İkizler – 1985
- Güldür Yüzümü – 1985
- Ağlama Yarim – 1984
- Bir Yıldız Doğuyor – 1984
- Sonsuz Sokaklar – 1984
- Umut Mahkûmları – 1984
- Geçim Otobüsü – 1984
- Halk Düşmanı – 1984
- Çare Sende Allahım – 1984
- Erkekçe – 1983
- Kobra – 1983
- Asya Ejderi – 1983
- Gül Ağacı – 1983
- İdamlık – 1983
- İkimiz De Sevdik – 1983
- Bir Zamanlar Kardeştiler – 1983
- Doğarken Öldüm – 1983
- Son Adam – 1983
- Küçük Ağa – 1983
- En Büyük Yumruk – 1983
- Kahreden Kurşun – 1983
- Gözüm Gibi Sevdim – 1982
- Dört Yanım Cehennem – 1982
- Gırgır Ali – 1982
- Gurbet Kuşları – 1982
- Kimsesizler – 1982
- Sancı – 1982
- Umut Dilencisi – 1982
- Kelepçe – 1982
- Aşk Pınarı – 1981
- Azap Çiçeği – 1981
- Dört Kardeşe Dört Gelin – 1981
- Hamaylı Boynundayım – 1981
- Mutlu Ol Yeter – 1981
- Seviyorum Allahım – 1981
- İntikam Yemini – 1981
- Takip – 1981
- Kader Arkadaşı – 1981
- Destan – 1980
- Kul Sevdası – 1980
- Zeytin Gözlüm – 1980
- İstanbul 1979 – 1979
- İntikam Kadını – 1979
- Dilberim Kıyma Bana – 1979
- Çılgın Bakireler – 1979
- Aşk Körfezi – 1979
- Ahlaksız / Utanç – 1979
- Öğren de Gel – 1979
- Seven Sevene – 1979
- Son Günah – 1979
- Günah Günleri – 1979
- Kadersizler – 1979
- Kalleş Adam – 1979
- Canın İsterse – 1979
- Çıplaklar – 1979
- Çivi Çiviyi Söker – 1979
- Enişte – 1979
- Günahkar Kadın – 1979
- Haydi Bastır – 1979
- Karanlık Sokaklar – 1979
- Komşunun Tavuğu – 1979
- Ölüm Emri – 1979
- Patronun Kızları – 1979
- Şıllık – 1979
- Yaz Deftere – 1979
- Aşk Kadını – 1979
- İsmet Bu Ne Kısmet – 1978
- Yengen – 1978
- Hayat Kadınları – 1978
- Kanlı Hayat – 1978
- Ilık Dudaklar – 1978
- Azrailin Beş Atlısı – 1978
- Bir Garip Yabancı – 1978
- El Bebek Gül Bebek – 1978
- Hey Yavrum Hey – 1978
- Kene – 1978
- Korkusuz Aşıklar – 1978
- Nefret – 1978
- Ölüm Savaşı – 1978
- Sıra Sana Gelecek – 1978
- Sormagir Sokağı – 1978
- Ya Bundadır Ya Şunda – 1978
- Aşk, Arzu Ve Silah – 1977
- Ölüm Dönemeci – 1977
- Dört Ateşli Yosma – 1977
- Son Gülen Tam Güler – 1977
- Akdeniz Kartalı – 1977
- Alman Gelin – 1977
- Aşk Durağı – 1977
- Bir Yiğit Gurbete Gitse – 1977
- Cemal – 1977
- Hıdır – 1977
- Kanunsuz Sokak – 1977
- Öl Seve Seve – 1977
- Sen Aşk Nedir Bilir misin – 1977
- Yaşamak Güzel Şey – 1977
- Yaman Delikanlı – 1977
- Şöhretin Bedeli – 1977
- Şoför – 1976
- Kadı Han – 1976
- Su Perisi Elması – 1976
- Elmanın Alına Bak – 1976
- Söyleyin Anama Ağlamasın – 1976
- Yarim İstanbul'u Mesken mi Tuttun – 1976
- Evlatlık – - 1976
- Sahte Kabadayı – 1976 Muhtar
- Nereye Arkadaş – 1976
- Kader Torbası – 1976
- Seni Sevmekle Suçluyum – 1976
- Babanın Oğlu – 1975
- Tatlı Tatlı – 1975
- Bana Beş Avrat Yetmez – 1975
- Kral Benim – 1975
- Namıdiğer Çolak – 1975
- Sansar – 1975
- Seferim Var – 1975
- Tekerlek – 1975
- Üç Gelin Altı Damat – 1975
- Bil Bakalım Ne Çıkacak – 1975
- Yırt Kazım – 1975
- Reşo / Vatan İçin – 1974
- Mağlup Edilemeyenler – 1974
- Sahildeki Yabancı – 1974
- Gün Akşam Oldu – 1974
- Her Gece Bardayım – 1974
- Kader – 1974
- Karaların Ali – 1974
- Oğul – 1974
- Şirvan – 1974
- Deli Ferhat – 1974
- Erkeksen Kaçma – 1974
- Dağ Kurdu – 1973
- Kara Pençe – 1973
- Tarkan: Güçlü Kahraman – 1973
- Cengiz Han'ın Fedaisi – 1973
- Kara Orkun – 1973
- Kara Pençe'nin İntikamı – 1973
- Soğukkanlılar – 1973
- Namın Yürüsün Behçet – 1973
- Tuzak – 1973
- Çılgın Gangster – 1973
- Destan – 1973
- Evlat Acısı – 1973
- Gecelerin Hakimi – 1973
- Kara Çalı – 1973
- Yaban – 1973
- Yarını Olmayanlar – 1973
- Yemin – 1973
- Siyah Eldivenli Adam – 1973
- Nefret – 1973
- Battal Gazi Geliyor – 1973
- Şehvet – 1972
- Karaoğlan Geliyor – 1972
- Dişi Akrep – 1972
- Akma Tuna – 1972
- Kan ve Kin – 1972
- Büyük Bela – 1972
- Ustura Behçet – 1972
- Cezanı Çekeceksin – 1972
- Cesurlar – 1972
- Gece – 1972
- Vur – 1972
- Hacı Murat'ın İntikamı – 1972
- Acı Yudum – 1972
- Bitirim Kemal – 1972
- Cehenneme Postalarım – 1972
- Çoban Ali – 1972
- Kanlı Öç – 1972
- Kartal Tepe – 1972
- Kuduzlar – 1972
- Süpürgesi Yoncadan – 1972
- Yedi Kişi Ölecek – 1972
- Müthiş Darbe – 1972
- Vahşetin Esirleri – 1972
- Murat ile Nazlı – 1972
- Çöl Kartalı – 1972
- Kanun Adamı – 1972
- Profesyoneller – 1971
- Her Kurşuna Bir Ölü – 1971
- Allı Turnam – 1971
- Cilalı İbo Teksas Fatihi – 1971
- Umutsuzlar – 1971
- Killing Ölüm Saçıyor – 1971
- Kartallar – 1971
- Cilalı İbo Yetimler Meleği – 1971
- Gelin Çiçeği – 1971
- Önce Sev Sonra Öldür – 1971
- Kurşunla Selamlarım – 1971
- Zehir Hafiye – 1971
- Allah Benimle – 1971
- Kadırgalı Ali – 1971
- Kanunsuz Yaşayanlar – 1971
- Ölümden Korkmuyorum – 1971
- Şahinler Diyarı – 1971
- Zagor Kara Korsanın Hazineleri – 1971
- Bir Çuval Para – 1970
- Zagor – 1970
- Aşk Sürgünü – 1970
- Deliormanlı – 1970
- Donanma Kamil – 1970
- Ecelin Gölgesinde – 1970
- Gülüm Nuri – 1970
- Kan ve Kurşun – 1970
- Kralların Kaderi – 1970
- Yemen'de Bir Avuç Türk – 1970
- Yeşil Kurbağalar – 1970
- Son Günah – 1970
- Mazi Kalbimde Yaradır – 1970
- Cilalı İbo Almanya'da – 1970
- Dikenli Hayat – 1969
- Hayırsız Evlat – 1969
- Ringo Vadiler Kaplanı – 1969
- Şirvan – 1969
- Talihsiz Gelin – 1969
- Dağa Çıkan Kız – 1969
- Beyaz Mendilim – 1969
- Bir Türk'e Gönül Verdim – 1969
- Sabrın Sonu – 1969
- Şeytanın Oyunu – 1969
- Bir Vefasız Yar İçin – 1969
- Ağlama Değmez Hayat – 1969
- Dişi Eşkıya – 1969
- Kaderimsin – 1969
- Tel Örgü – 1969
- Bataklı Damın Kızı Aysel – 1969
- Sabah Olmasın – 1969
- Aşk Bu Değil – 1969
- Kara Güneş – 1968
- Şeyh Ahmet Şeyhin Oğlu – 1968
- Urfa İstanbul – 1968
- Yedi Köyün Zeynebi – 1968
- Beşikteki Miras – 1968
- Dertli Pınar – 1968
- Kocadağlı – 1967
- Silahları Ellerinde Öldüler – 1967
- Göklerdeki Sevgili – 1966
- O Kadın – 1966
- Konyakçı – 1965
- Severek Ölenler – 1965
- Kasımpaşalı – 1965
- Tehlikeli Adam – 1965
- Elveda Sevgilim – 1965
- Vatansız Haydut – 1964
- Anadolu Çocuğu – 1964
- Mor Defter – 1964
- Hancının Kızı – 1963
