= Zümrüt Cansel =

Turkish Cypriot actress

- Born: Zümrüt Cansel; 23 March 1963 (age 63); London, United Kingdom
- Occupation: Actress
- Years active: 1978–1993
- Children: 3
- Mother: Feri Cansel

Zümrüt Cansel (born 23 March 1963) is a British-born Turkish Cypriot actress. Cansel is best known for her roles in the Yeşilçam films. She is the daughter of the Turkish Cypriot actress Feri Cansel.

== Personal life ==
Cansel is married and has three children.

== Filmography ==
Film
Year	Film	Role	Notes
1993	Aldanış		
1986	Melek Yüzlü Cani / Nefret	Melek	
1985	Gizli Yara	Hülya	
1985	Paranın Esiri	Lale	
1985	Suçlu Gençlik	Nazlı	
1985	Tele Kızlar	Cansu	
1985	Yalnızım	Aysel	
1984	Bir Sevgi İstiyorum	Zeynep	
1984	Gizli Duygular	Ayşecan	
1984	Kızgın Güneş	Mine	
1978	Hababam Sınıfı Dokuz Doğuruyor	Ayşe	
