= Remzi Aydın Jöntürk =

- Born: September 15, 1936; Erzincan, Turkey
- Died: September 2, 1987 (aged 50); Çanakkale, Turkey
- Occupations: Filmmaker; actor; screenwriter; producer
- Years active: 1960–1987

Remzi Aydın Jöntürk (September 15, 1936 – September 2, 1987) was a Turkish filmmaker, actor, screenwriter, and producer. He directed more than 72 feature films in his long career.

Jöntürk is credited for creating and directing some of the most famous examples of the Turkish psychedelic cinema including Yarınsız Adam (The Man without Tomorrow) and Yıkılmayan Adam (The Indestructible Man), both starring Cüneyt Arkın as part of his psychedelic socio-political action The Adam Trilogy. He is considered one of the most prominent psychedelic-action film makers of 1970s Turkish cinema during its boom period.

== Life ==
Son of İbrahim Aydın who was a military officer, Jöntürk was born September 15, 1936, in Erzincan, Turkey where his father was appointed as central government representative. He studied at the prestigious Kuleli Military High School, and then at Istanbul Institute of Journalism and Academy of Fine Arts. Jöntürk entered into cinema in the 1960s starting out as a set designer in Yesilcam. While an assistant director to Sureyya Duru, in 1964, he directed his first film Zımba Gibi Delikanlı starring Palme d'Or winner Yılmaz Güney.

== Death ==
He died on September 2, 1987, at age 50 in a traffic accident in Çanakkale, Turkey, just 13 days shy of his 51st birthday.

== Banning of Zindan in Germany ==
Zindan (Prison) a 1974 action film directed by Jöntürk, was banned in Germany in 1988.

== Filmography ==
Films as actor (5 films)

- Malkoçoğlu Kara Korsan 1968
- Aslan Bey 1968
- Malkoçoğlu Krallara Karşı 1967
- Başlık 1965
- Kamalı Zeybek 1964

Films as director (72 films)

- Afrodit (Aphrodite) 1987
- Yaralı Can (Wounded Hearth) 1987
- Kucuk Prens (Verbatim Turkish adoptation of Saint-Exupéry's The Little Prince)
- Biraz Neşe Biraz Keder (Sometimes happiness, sometimes sadness) 1986
- Domdom Kurşunu (Buckshot) 1985
- Eroin Hattı (Heroine Connection) 1985
- Altar 1985
- Geçim Otobüsü (Election Bus) 1984
- Halk Düşmanı (Enemy of State) 1984
- Beş Kafadar (Five Friends) 1984
- İkimiz De Sevdik (We Both Fell in Love) 1983
- Can Kurban (I'd give my life) 1983
- Nikah (Wedding) 1983
- Aşk Adası (Island of Love) 1983
- Türkiyem 1983
- Bir Pazar Günü (On a Sunday) 1982
- Ağlayan Gülmedi mi? (Those Who Cry Also Laughs) 1982
- Milcan 1981
- Öğretmen Kemal (Kemal the Teacher) 1981
- Acı Gerçekler (Painful Truth) 1981
- Takip (Chase) 1981
- Unutulmayanlar (Unforgettables) 1981
- Çile (Heartache) 1980
- Çile Tarlası (Field of Heartaches) 1980
- Destan (Legend) 1980
- Kara Yazma (Black Scarf) 1979
- Hayat Harcadın Beni (Wasted by the Life) 1979
- Uyanış (Awakening) 1978
- Kaplanlar Ağlamaz (Tigers don't Cry) 1978
- Lekeli Melek (Stained Angel) 1978
- Avare (Vagabond) 1978
- Kan (Blood) 1977
- Yıkılmayan Adam (Indestructible Man) 1977
- Satılmış Adam (Sold Man) 1977
- Şeref Yumruğu (Fist of Honor) 1977
- Hırçın Kız (Wild Girl) 1977
- Yarınsız Adam (Man without Tomorrow) 1976
- Ölüme Yalnız Gidilir (Lone Voyage to Death) 1976
- Silahlara Veda (Farewell to Arms) 1976
- Tepedeki Ev (House on the Hill) 1976
- Hora Geliyor Hora (Here comes Hora) 1976
- Bir Defa Yetmez (Never Enough) 1975
- İsyan (Mutiny) 1975
- Macera (Adventure) 1975
- Yarınlar Bizim (Tomorrows are Ours) 1975
- Kahramanlar (Heroes) 1974
- Zindan (Prison) 1974
- Sayılı Kabadayılar 1974
- Göç (Migration) 1974
- Duvak 1973
- Pir Sultan Abdal 1973
- Arap Abdo (Abdo the Arab) 1973
- Elif İle Seydo (Elif and Seydo) 1972
- İntikam Kartalları (Eagles of Revenge) 1971
- Hasret 1971
- Kader Bağlayınca (When Destiny Bounds) 1970
- Sevgili Muhafızım (My Beloved Bodyguard) 1970
- Avare (Vagabond) 1970
- Yaralı Kalp (Wounded Hearth) 1969
- Malkoçoğlu Cem Sultan 1969
- Malkoçoğlu Kara Korsan (Black Pirate) 1968
- Cango Ölüm Süvarisi (a.k.a. Korkusuz Adam) (Django, the Fighter of Death) 1967
- Malkoçoğlu Krallara Karşı 1967
- Bir Şoförün Gizli Defteri (Secret Diary of a Chauffeur) 1967
- Eşkiya Celladı (Executioner of Bandits) 1967
- At Hırsızı Banuş (Banush the Horse Thief) 1967
- Ve Silahlara Veda (And Farewell to Arms) 1966
- Yaşamak Haram Oldu (Living has become a Sin) 1966
- Göklerdeki Sevgili (My Love in the Sky) 1966
- Zorlu Düşman (Though Enemy) 1966
- Beyaz Atlı Adam (The Man with White Horse) 1965
- Mağrur Ve Sefil (Victim and Poor) 1965
- Zımba Gibi Delikanlı (Straight Guy) 1964

Films as producer (5 films)

- Altar 1985
- Domdom Kurşunu 1985
- Halk Düşmanı 1984
- Elif İle Seydo 1972
- İntikam Kartalları 1971

Films as scriptwriter (44 films)

- Domdom Kurşunu 1985
- Eroin Hattı 1985
- Beş Kafadar 1984
- Geçim Otobüsü 1984
- İkimiz De Sevdik 1983
- Aşk Adası 1983
- Bir Pazar Günü 1982
- Acı Gerçekler 1981
- Azap Çiçeği 1981
- Milcan 1981
- Unutulmayanlar 1981
- Sevgi Dünyası 1980
- Avare 1978
- Kaplanlar Ağlamaz 1978
- Hayata Dönüş 1977
- Hırçın Kız 1977
- Hora Geliyor Hora 1976
- Ölüme Yalnız Gidilir 1976
- Silahlara Veda 1976
- Bir Defa Yetmez 1975
- İsyan 1975
- Macera 1975
- Kahramanlar 1974
- Sayılı Kabadayılar 1974
- Zindan 1974
- Göç 1974
- Duvak 1973
- Elif İle Seydo 1972
- Malkoçoğlu Ölüm Fedaileri 1971
- Hasret 1971
- İntikam Kartalları 1971
- Melikşah 1969
- Malkoçoğlu Akıncılar Geliyor 1969
- Yaralı Kalp 1969
- Malkoçoğlu Cem Sultan 1969
- Yakılacak Kitap 1968
- Bir Şoförün Gizli Defteri 1967
- Bir Şoförün Gizli Defteri 1967
- Eşkiya Celladı 1967
- Yaşamak Haram Oldu 1966
- Göklerdeki Sevgili 1966
- Ve Silahlara Veda 1966
- Beyaz Atlı Adam 1965
- Zımba Gibi Delikanlı 1964

Films as book author (1 film)

- Kader 1968

Films as assistant director (1 film)

- Şoför Nebahat Ve Kızı
