= Yasemin Allen =

English-Turkish actress (born 1989)

- Born: Yasemin Kay Allen; 10 July 1989 (age 37); London, England
- Occupations: Actress, model
- Years active: 2008–present
- Spouse: Erdal Kaya (m. 2026)
- Mother: Suna Yıldızoğlu

Yasemin Kay Allen (born 10 July 1989) is a British-Turkish actress.

== Early years ==
Allen was born in London, one of two children of English father Dudley Allen and the English actress and singer Sonja Eady who, with her first marriage to Turkish actor Kayhan Yıldızoğlu, had gained Turkish citizenship. When she was three months old, her family moved to Turkey. She went to Australia with her mother after she completed elementary school, where she took cinema, television, drama and Japanese courses and earned a scholarship from the University of Queensland. She returned to Turkey when she was 18, and, in 2008, graduated from Müjdat Gezen Konservatuarı with degree in Theater Arts.

== Career ==
=== Television ===
In 2008, Allen was cast in the leading role in the Turkish television series Elif. In 2010 she starred as Elena in the series Kavak Yelleri (the Turkish version of Dawson's Creek), and Juliette in the series Yerden Yüksek. In 2011 she played Pelin Akça in Hayat Devam Ediyor. In 2013 she played Irmak Tunalı in the series Merhamet, then starred as Defne Sultan in the epic drama series Muhteşem Yüzyıl. In the same year she played the character Sibel in the gang drama series Şeref Meselesi. That was followed by the series 46 Yok Olan, Fi, İyi Günde Kötü Günde, Menajerimi Ara, The Usual Suspects, Erkek Severse, Dokuz Oğuz, The Last Day, The Turkish Detective, Bahar, To Love, To Lose and, as of 2026, continues with her long-time role in Back Streets.

=== Film ===
In 2013, Yasemin Allen starred alongside Turkish singer Özcan Deniz in her film debut Su ve Ateş, playing the leading role Yağmur Efe. That was followed by the 2016 romantic comedy Dönerse Senindir and the 2018 film Dorothy's Theory.

=== Commercials ===
In 2008, Allen was a finalist in the L'Oréal' Face Competition and, in 2014, hosted the Elite Miss Turkey Beauty Contest. She appeared in commercials for Sprite, TTNET, and the shopping site N11.com.

== Personal life ==
In 2014, at the Turkey Elle Style Awards, Allen was nominated as Most Stylish Actress.

In 2026, Allen married former FBI agent Erdal Kaya.

== Filmography ==
Film
Year	Title	Role	Notes
2013	Su ve Ateş	Yağmur Efe	Leading Role
2016	Dönerse Senindir	Selin	Leading role
2017	Dorothy's Theory	Dorothy's mother	Short film

Television
Year	Title	Role	Notes
2008	Elif	Elif Doğan	Leading role
2010	Kavak Yelleri	Elena Banderenko/Karakuş	Supporting role
2010–2011	Yerden Yüksek	Juliette/Jüjü	Supporting role
2011–2012	Hayat Devam Ediyor	Pelin Akça	Leading role
2013–2014	Merhamet	Irmak Tunalı	Supporting role
2014	Muhteşem Yüzyıl	Defne Sultan	Supporting role
2014–2015	Şeref Meselesi	Sibel	Leading role
2014	Ulan İstanbul	Sibel	Guest role
2016	46: Yok Olan	Selin Acar	Leading role
2019–2020	Strike Back	Katrina Zarkova	Supporting role
2020	İyi Günde Kötü Günde	Melisa Yalçınkaya	Leading role
2021	Menajerimi Ara	Herself	Guest appearance
2023	Dokuz Oğuz	Tomris Albay	Leading role
2024	Bahar	Dora Ersoy	Supporting role
2025	Arka Sokaklar	Gökçe Kurt	Leading role

Streaming series
Year	Title	Role	Notes
2017–2018	Fi	Ece Sayda	Guest Appearance
2021	Olağan Şüpheliler	Zuhal Emirci	Leading role
2022	Erkek Severse	Yelda Dönmez	Leading role
2023	Son Gün	Gizem	Leading role
2023	The Turkish Detective	Ayşe Farsakoğlu	Leading role
2026	Ayrılık da Sevdaya Dahil	Neslihan	Leading role

Music videos
Year	Artist	Song	Notes
2012	Ilgaz Erel	"Rüyamda"	
2012	Ogün Şanlısoy	"Büyüdük Aniden"	

== Awards ==
Year	Award	Category	Work	Result
2014	Internet Media of the Year Awards	Best TV Star of the Year	Merhamet	Won
