= Aydemir Akbaş =

Turkish actor and screenwriter (1936–2024)

- Born: 25 February 1936; Istanbul, Turkey
- Died: 16 August 2024 (aged 88); Istanbul, Turkey
- Resting place: Feriköy Cemetery
- Occupations: Screenwriter, film director, actor, journalist, sportswriter
- Spouse: Beyhan Benek

Aydemir Akbaş (25 February 1936 – 16 August 2024) was a Turkish screenwriter, director, actor, journalist and sports writer.

== Biography ==
Akbaş was born in 1936 in Feriköy, Istanbul to an Albanian father and a mother from Sürmene. His father came to Istanbul during the Balkan Wars. His uncle was a member of the Movement Army. After studying at Galatasaray High School, he worked as a journalist for a while.

Akbaş divorced his wife, theater actress Beyhan Benek, whom he married in 1964, twice and married three times.

On 15 August 2024, Akbaş was hospitalised after being found unconscious at his home and kept in intensive care. He died on 16 August, at the age of 88. One day later, he was buried at Feriköy Cemetery.

== Filmography ==
=== Films ===
- Keşanlı Ali Destanı (1964)
- Bitmeyen Yol (1965)
- Güzel Bir Gün İçin (1965)
- Kovboy Ali (1966)
- Çirkin Kral (1966)
- Nuh'un Gemisi (1966)
- At Avrat Silah (1966)
- Eşrefpaşalı (1966)
- Hudutların Kanunu (1966)
- Kozanoğlu (1967)
- Vesikalı Yarim (1967)
- Alevli Yıllar (1968)
- Vatan ve Namık Kemal (1969)
- Belanın Yedi Türlüsü (1969)
- Yaşamak Ne Güzel Şey (1969)
- Gazi Kadın (1973)
- Anter Kara Ali (1974)
- Kazım'a Bak Kazım'a (1975)
- Vay Anasına (1975)
- Amigo Hüsnü (1975)
- İkimiz Bir Fidanız (1975)
- Kazım'a Ne Lazım (1975)
- Plaj Horozu (1975)
- Erkek Kazım (1975)
- Ördek Çıkacak Kaz Çıkacak (1975)
- Tantana Kemal (1975)
- Gariban Şakir (1975)
- Ayıkla Beni Hüsnü (1975)
- Çapkın Kızlar (1975)
- Elma Şekeri (1975)
- Alemin Keyfi Yerinde (1975)
- Çukulata Sevgilim (1975)
- Parayla Değil Sırayla (Ali Cengiz Oyunu) (1975)
- Bitirimler Sınıfı (1975)
- Beş Atış Yirmibeş (1975)
- O Kadınlar (1976)
- Ah Ne Güzel Nane Şekeri (1976)
- Avanak (1976)
- Dağılın Kazımlar Geliyor (1976)
- Kolombo Şakir (1976)
- Nazmiye'nin Koltukları (1976)
- O Biçim Miras (1976)
- Bitirim Hüsnü (1976)
- Al Gülüm Ver Gülüm (1977)
- Delidir Ne Yapsa Yeridir (1977)
- Ava Giden Avlanır (1977)
- Bazıları Cacık Sever (1977)
- Hızlı Giden Yorulur (1977)
- Güneş Ne Zaman Doğacak (1977)
- Yeşilçam Sokağı (1977)
- Zeynel ile Veysel (1977)
- Balkona Etti (Haydar) (1978)
- Çarli'nin Kelekleri (1978)
- İster Gül İster Ağla (1978)
- Şerefsiz Şeref (1978)
- Hanım Evladı (1978)
- Kendin Pişir Kendin Ye (1978)
- Yüzme Bilmiyorsan İşin Ne Ağaçta (1978)
- Bionik Ali Futbolcu (1978)
- Oooh Oh (1978)
- Yedi Yürekli Şaban (Çapkınlar Kralı) (1978)
- Astronot Fehmi (1978)
- Acemi Dolandırıcılar (1979)
- Süper Selami (1979)
- Afferin Çocuğa (1979)
- Bacanak (1979)
- Tatlı ve Güzel: İstanbul Geceleri (1979)
- Ay Aman Of (1979)
- Öttür Kuş Ömer (1979)
- Binlik Nail (1979)
- Şaşkın Milyonerler (1980)
- Şabancık (1981)
- Seni Yakacaklar (1981)
- Futboliye (1983)
- Üşütük (1984)
- Lodos Zühtü (1984)
- Sevmek (1985)
- Gazino Bülbülü (1985)
- Ödlek (1986)
- Ay Işığı Operasyonu (1986)
- Gülüm Benim (1987)
- Düş Yakamdan Osman (1987)
- Seyyar Kamil (1987)
- Bütün Kuşlar Vefasız (1987)
- Dilekçe (1988)
- Kara Zindan (1988)
- Bir Kulum İşte (1988)
- Bakımsız Tarzan (1989)
- Hopla Dünya (1989)
- Çılgın Berber (1990)
- Boynu Bükük Küheylan (1990)
- Muhteşem Enayi (1990)
- Sarışın Yıldız (1991)
- Vatandaş Hayri (1996)
- Dilber (1999)
- Paydos (2004)
- Büyük Tuzak (2005)
- Avrupalı (2007)
- Gölgesizler (2008)
- Kutsal Damacana 2: İtmen (2009)
- Kolpaçino (2009)
- Kolpaçino Bomba (2011)
- Kolpaçino 3. Devre (2016)
- Alemde 1 Gece (2016)
- Sünnet Çocuğu (2022)
- Kolpaçino 4 4'lük (2023)

==== TV series ====
- Ahududu (1974)
- Diyet (1975)
- Bizi Güldürenler (1986)
- Keşanlı Ali Destanı (1988)
- Çaylar Şirketten (1989)
- Bir Milyara Bir Çocuk (1990)
- Hanımın Çiftliği (1990)
- Itri (1991)
- At Kestanesi (1991)
- Belkıs Hanımın Konağı (1992)
- Tetikçi Kemal (1993)
- Bizim Takım (1993)
- Üç Kişilik Dünya (1993)
- Tatlı Betüş (1993)
- Aşık Oldum (1995)
- Fırat (1997–98)
- İmparator (1998)
- Baldız Geliyorum Demez (2002)
- Cabbar (2002)
- Yadigar (2004)
- Ayva Sarı Nar Kırmızı (2004)
- Cennet Mahallesi (2004)
- Naciye'yi Kim Sevmez (2005)
- Köpek (2005)
- Altındağlı (2013)

==== Theater ====
- Hakkımı Ver Hakkı (1960)
- Keşanlı Ali Destanı (1960)
- Düş Yakamdan Osman (1960)

=== As a director ===
- Düş Yakamdan Osman (1987)
- Seyyar Kamil (1987)
- Dilekçe (1988)
- Bakımsız Tarzan (1989)
- Çılgın Berber (1990)
- Muhteşem Enayi (1990)
- Vatandaş Hayri (1996)
- Sünnet Çocuğu (2022)
