= Yıkılmayan Adam =

- Directed by: Remzi Aydın Jöntürk
- Written by: Celal Uysal; Ali Fuat Kalkan
- Produced by: Hasan Baykara; Deniz Kalkavan
- Starring: Cüneyt Arkın; Suna Yıldızoğlu; Eşref Kolçak; Levent Çakır
- Release date: 1977
- Country: Turkey
- Language: Turkish

Yıkılmayan Adam (The Indestructible Man) is a 1977 Turkish political film directed by Remzi Aydın Jöntürk. It is the final film of his "The Adam Trilogy", following the 1976 Yarınsız Adam (Man Without Tomorrow) and Satılmış Adam (The Sold Man) of 1977. The film stars Cüneyt Arkın, Suna Yıldızoğlu, Eşref Kolçak and Levent Çakır.

== Cast ==
- Cüneyt Arkın as Çakır
- Eşref Kolçak as Nadir
- Memduh Ün as Memeduh
- Suna Yıldızoğlu as Fatoş
- Macit Flordun as Gani
- Levent Çakır as Hayri

== See also ==
- Cinema of Turkey
