= Sold Man =

Satılmış Adam
- Theatrical poster
- Directed by: Remzi Aydın Jöntürk
- Screenplay by: Sefa Önal
- Produced by: Berker İnanoğlu
- Starring: Cüneyt Arkın; Perihan Savaş; Nejat Özbek
- Edited by: Necdet Tok; Mehmet Tezgehdar
- Production company: Sezer Film
- Release date: 1977
- Country: Turkey
- Language: Turkish

Satılmış Adam (English: Sold Man) is a 1977 Turkish political thriller action film directed by Remzi Aydın Jöntürk, the second piece of his Adam Trilogy. It comes after Yarınsız Adam (Man Without Tomorrow) of 1976 and before Yıkılmayan Adam (Indestructible Man) of 1977. It stars Cüneyt Arkın, Perihan Savaş and Nejat Özbek.
