= Cihan Ünal =

Turkish actor

- Born: 22 January 1946 (age 80); Taşköprü, Kastamonu, Turkey
- Occupation: Actor
- Years active: 1960–present
- Spouses: Sabiha Tarhan (m. 1970–1978) Türkan Şoray (m. 1983–1987): ? (m. ?–?); Nazlı Tazebay (m. 2000–2002)
- Children: 2

Cihan Ünal (born 22 January 1946) is a Turkish actor.

== Biography ==
He finished elementary school in Tosya and Kırıkkale. After continuing his education at Ankara Cebeci Secondary School and Kurtuluş High School, he worked in Ankara Radio Children's Programs, Ankara Radio Education Programs, Radio Theater and Arkası Yarın in 1960–1964.

In the same years, he worked as an amateur actor in children's theater and private theaters. In 1962 he attended theater courses at Ankara Halkevi. Then he acted in the same institution. He received training from Nüzhet Şenbay, Nurettin Sevin, Suat Taşer, Haldun Marlalı and Mahir Canova. He also starred in the play Öteye Doğru directed by Suat Taşer. Between 1963 and 1964, he took part in small roles in Ankara State Theater plays. He entered Ankara State Conservatory in 1964.

He graduated from the Theater Department of the Conservatory in 1969 and started to work as an actor in Ankara State Theater the same year. He first played in the movie Damdaki Kemancı in 1971. His second feature film was Şeytan, one of the first Turkish horror classics. He worked as an assistant to Cüneyt Gökçer in the acting department of Ankara State Conservatory between 1971–1973. Between 1973 and 1982, he gave diction, mimic, role and stage classes as a lecturer at the same school.

In 1982, he went to London with the British Council scholarship. There he continued his education by participating in various rehearsals at the Royal National Theater and the Royal Shakespeare Company. He also worked as a guest teacher with the instructors in RADA (Royal Academy of Dramatic Art) for two months in London. He then worked at Ankara State Theater until 1983. Between 1987 and 2000, he continued his role as a lecturer at Mimar Sinan University State Conservatory's Theater Department by giving role, diction, mimic and stage lessons.

As a guest of the British Council and Royal Shakespeare Company, he attended seminars in Stratford in 1992. In 1997, he taught in a private diction and announcer course. In 1999, he taught acting and diction classes at Yeditepe University. In 2000, he taught diction, mimic, role and stage lessons at Hacettepe University State Conservatory. In 2001, he became the Head of the Theater Department at the same institution.

== Theatre ==
=== State theatres ===
- King Lear : William Shakespeare - Ankara State Theatre - 1980
- Bağdat Hatun : Güngör Dilmen - Ankara State Theatre - 1980
- The Liberated Don Quixote : Anatoly Lunacharsky - Ankara State Theatre - 1978
- Harold and Maude : Colin Higgins - Ankara State Theatre - 1977
- The Good Doctor : Neil Simon\Anton Chekhov - Ankara State Theatre - 1976
- Yunus Emre : Recep Bilginer - Ankara State Theatre - 1974
- Bu Hesapta Yoktu : Nikolai Ostrovsky - Ankara State Theatre - 1973
- The Imaginary Invalid : Molière - Ankara State Theatre - 1972
- Fatih : Turan Oflazoğlu - Ankara State Theatre - 1972
- I, Don Quixote : Dale Wasserman - Ankara State Theatre - 1971
- Becket : Jean Anouilh - Ankara State Theatre - 1971
- Romeo and Juliet : William Shakespeare - Ankara State Theatre - 1971
- Murat IV : Turan Oflazoğlu - Ankara State Theatre - 1970
- Andromaque : Jean Racine - Ankara State Theatre - 1968
- Le verre d'eau ou Les Effets et les Causes : Eugène Scribe - Ankara State Theatre - 1967
- A Dream Play : August Strindberg - Ankara State Theatre - 1964
- Peter Pan : James Matthew Barrie - Ankara State Theatre - 1964
- Julius Caesar : William Shakespeare - Ankara State Theatre - 1963

=== Musicals performed at state theatres ===
- My Fair Lady : Alan Jay Lerner - Ankara State Theatre - 1976
- Fiddler on the Roof : Sholem Aleichem - Ankara State Theatre - 1969

=== Egemen Bostancı Theatre ===
- Yedi Kocalı Hürmüz : Sadık Şendil - Egemen Bostancı Theatre - 1979

=== Istanbul City Theatre ===
- Uncle Vanya : Anton Çehov - Istanbul City Theatre - 1994
- Evita : Andrew Lloyd Webber\Tim Rice - Istanbul City Theatre - 1989

=== Dormen Theatre ===
- Good Morning Mr. Weill : Haldun Dormen - 1991

=== Istanbul State Opera and Ballet ===
- The Merry Widow

=== Tiyatro İstanbul ===
- Çetin Ceviz
- Aktör Kean - 1996
- Yeni Baştan
- Sanat-(Art)
- Bu Adreste Bulunamadı
- Dönme Dolap (oyun)
- Altı Haftada Altı Dans Dersi

== Theatre plays directed ==
- Six Dance Lessons in Six Weeks : Richard Alfieri - Tiyatro İstanbul - 2008
- Sihirli Kelimeler : Karl Herz Gies - Ankara State Theatre - 1975

== Filmography ==
- Damdaki Kemancı - 1971
- Şeytan - 1974
- Yargıç ve Celladı - 1975
- Die Rose und die Nachtigall (Gül ve Bülbül) - 1977
- Murat IV -1980
- Kuruluş - Osmancık -1987
- Herhangi Bir Kadın
- Seni Kalbime Gömdüm
- Mine
- Seni Seviyorum
- Bir Kadın Bir Hayat
- İhtiras Fırtınası
- Bir Sevgi İstiyorum
- Körebe
- O Kadın
- Gazap Rüzgarları
- Kalbimdeki Düşman
- Gece Dansı Tutsakları
- Kadın İsterse
- Muhteşem Yüzyıl: Kösem : Kuyucu Murad Pasha - 2016
- Söz : Büyük Bey - 2017
- Kafalar Karışık : Ünal - 2018
- Yalnız Kurt : Davut Bahadır (Kumandan) - 2022
- Kuruluş: Orhan : Osman I - 2025
