= Cüneyt Arkın =

Turkish actor and filmmaker (1937–2022)

- Born: Fahrettin Cüreklibatır; 7 September 1937; Odunpazarı, Eskişehir, Turkey
- Died: 28 June 2022 (aged 84); Beşiktaş, Istanbul, Turkey
- Resting place: Zincirlikuyu Cemetery
- Education: Istanbul University
- Occupations: Film actor, director, producer
- Years active: 1964–2022
- Known for: Martial arts, combat roles
- Spouses: Güler (Mocan) Cüreklibatır (m. 1964; div. 1968); Betül (Işıl) Cüretlibatur (m. 1970; div. 1971) (m. 1972)
- Children: 3
- Awards: Golden Orange Award for Best Actor (1969, 1976); Golden Boll Award for Best Actor (1973)
- Website: www.cuneytarkin.com.tr

Fahrettin Cüreklibatır (7 September 1937 – 28 June 2022), better known by his stage name Cüneyt Arkın, was a Turkish film actor, director, producer and physician. Having starred in somewhere around 300 movies and TV series, he is widely considered one of the most prominent Turkish actors of all time. Arkın's films have ranged from well-received dramas to mockbusters throughout his career spanning four decades.

With Fatma Girik, he played in Sevişmek Yasak, Kolsuz Kahraman, Köroğlu, Vatan ve Namık Kemal, Büyük Yemin, Satın Alınan Koca, Murat ile Nazlı, Gönülden yaralılar, Önce Vatan, Gelincik.

Early in his career, Arkın became known for starring in historical dramas taking place during the first centuries of the Ottoman Empire and Anatolian Seljuks, such as Malkoçoğlu Cem Sultan and Battal Gazi. While gaining success with such action-based films, he also took part in political films in the late 1970s, the most famous of those being The Adam Trilogy directed by Remzi Aydın Jöntürk. Arkın and Jöntürk continued their collaboration on many other films. Cüneyt Arkın and Fatma Girik are one of the most famous partnerships of Yeşilçam Turkish cinema.

In the 1980s, Arkın became known abroad for the film Dünyayı Kurtaran Adam (The Man Who Saves The World, also known as Turkish Star Wars), a low-budget science fantasy martial arts film, tentatively famous for featuring bootlegged scenes from Star Wars. Today, the B movie has a cult following.

== Career ==
While he was doing his military service as a reserve officer in his hometown of Eskişehir, he caught the attention of director Halit Refiğ during the filming of "Şafak Bekçileri" (1963) about the airforce starring Göksel Arsoy. After completing his military service, he worked as a doctor in and around Adana. In 1963, he won the first prize in the Artist magazine. Seeking a job for a while, Cüneyt Arkın started acting in 1963 with the offer of Halit Refiğ and translated at least 30 films in two years.

The fight scene in the end in film Gurbet Kuşları in 1964 was a breaking point in Arkın's career. After playing emotional and romantic young characters for a while, he turned to action films with the suggestion of Halit Refiğ. During this period, he studied acrobatics at the Medrano Circus in Istanbul for six months. By transferring what he learned here in the Malkoçoğlu and Battal Gazi Destanı series to the big screen, he brought a unique style to Turkish cinema. He soon became the most sought-after actor in adventure films. Although he started his film career with romantic young heroes, he continued with action films, but almost every character died. Throughout his career, he shot various genres from western to comedy, from adventure movies to social movies. Especially, Maden (1978) and Vatandaş Rıza (1979) occupy a special place in Cüneyt Arkın's career.

== Personal life ==
Fahrettin Cüreklibatur was born on 7 September 1937, in the village of Gökçeoğlu in the Alpu district of Eskişehir Province, Turkey to a family of Crimean Tatar and Nogai origin.

After graduation from the university as a physician, Cüreklibatır married his classmate Dr. Güler Mocan in 1964. In 1966, their daughter Filiz Cüreklibatır was born. The marriage did not last long due to Cüreklibatır's newly flourishing career as a film actor.

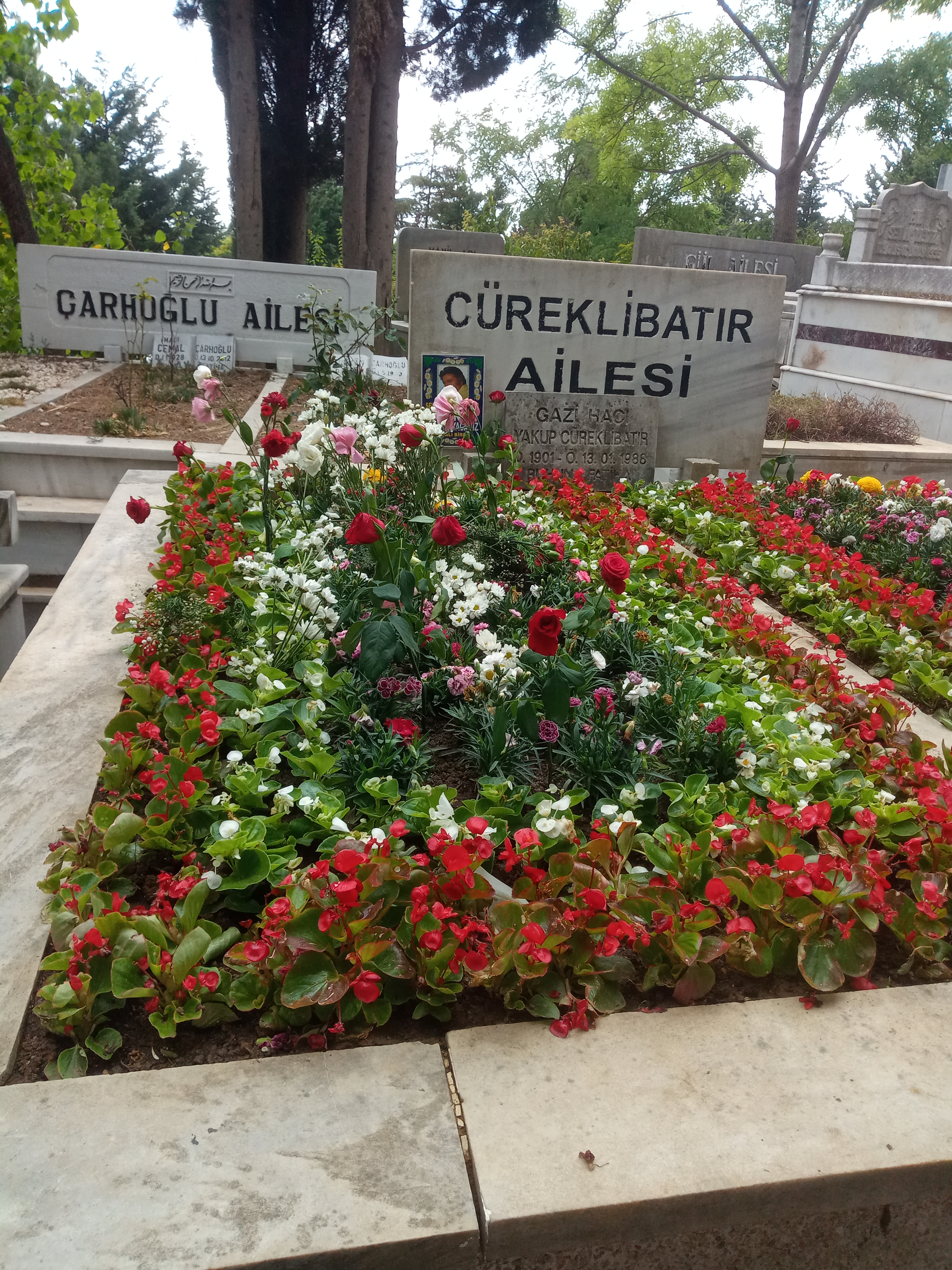
Burial place at Zincirlikuyu Cemetery

In 1968, he took the stage name Cüneyt Arkın, and met Betül Işıl, the daughter of a wealthy family that owned a tile manufacturing company. Işıl, a graduate of a university in Switzerland was working as a flight attendant at the time. They were engaged in 1969, married in 1970, and divorced in 1971. Soon afterwards, they remarried and Betül gave birth to two sons, actor Murat Arkın and Kaan Polat.

Arkın's wife and sons have starred in several of his films.

Cüneyt Arkın died at a hospital in Istanbul after suffering a cardiac arrest at home on 28 June 2022. On 30 June, he was interred at Zincirlikuyu Cemetery. Following his death, the Beşiktaş municipal council voted to name the Artists' Park in Akatlar, Beşiktaş after him.

== Awards ==
Year	Nominee / work	Award	Result
1963	"First Prize" (1.'lik Ödülü")	Artist (journal, 1960)	Won
1969	"Best Actor Award" ("En İyi Erkek Oyuncu Ödülü"), for İnsanlar Yaşadıkça	6. Altın Portakal Film Festivali	Won
1972	"Best Actor Award" ("En İyi Erkek Oyuncu Ödülü"), for Yaralı Kurt	4. Altın Koza Film Festivali	Won
1976	"Best Actor Award" ("En İyi Erkek Oyuncu Ödülü"), for Mağlup Edilemeyenler	13. Altın Portakal Film Festivali	Won
1999	"Lifetime Honor Award" ("Yaşam Boyu Onur Ödülü")	36. Altın Portakal Film Festivali	Won
2013	"Lifetime Profession and Honor Award" ("Yaşam Boyu Meslek ve Onur Ödülü")	Engelsiz Yaşam Vakfı	Won
2013	"Lifetime Honor Award" ("Yaşam Boyu Onur Ödülü")	3. Sadri Alışık Anadolu Tiyatro Oyuncu Ödülleri	Won
2013	"Culture and Art Grand Prize" ("Kültür ve Sanat Büyük Ödülü")	2013 Yılı Kültür ve Sanat Büyük Ödülü	Won
2021	"Culture and Art Grand Prize" ("Kültür ve Sanat Büyük Ödülü")	Presidential Culture and Arts Grand Awards	Won

== Filmography ==
Year	Film	Functioned as					Notes
Year	Film	Actor	Director	Writer	Producer	Role	Notes
1964
1964	Gurbet Kuşları	Yes				Selim Bakırcıoğlu	Debut role
1964	Love and Grudge	Yes				Dr. Kadri Ersoy	First leading role
1964	Gözleri Ömre Bedel	Yes				Suat Arseren	
1964	Hepimiz Kardeşiz	Yes				Öğretmen Ahmet	
1964	Ayşecik Çıtı Pıtı Kız	Yes				Fikret	
1964	İstanbul Sokaklarında	Yes				Metin	
1964	Günah Kızları	Yes					
1964	Sıkı Dur Geliyorum	Yes				Osman Murat	
1964	Yalnız Değiliz	Yes				Hakan	
1964	İstanbul	Yes					
1964	Çöpçatanlar Kampı	Yes					
1964	Cehennem Arkadaşları	Yes				Eşref	
1964	Yankesici Kız	Yes				Orhan Varol	
1964	Şoför Nebahat Ve Kızı	Yes				Murat	
1964	İstanbul'un Kızları	Yes				Semih	
1965	Kırık Hayatlar	Yes				Ömer	
1965	Sürtük	Yes				Piyanist Cüneyt	
1965	Dudaktan Kalbe	Yes				Kenan	
1965	Serseri Aşık	Yes				Erol	
1965	Sevgim Ve Gururum	Yes				Cihat Bağdatlı	
1965	Haremde Dört Kadın	Yes				Dr. Cemal	
1965	İnatçı Gelin	Yes				Metin	
1965	Ah Bu Dünya	Yes				Orhan	
1965	Devlerin Kavgası	Yes				Murat	
1965	Horasan'dan Gelen Bahadır	Yes				Ebu Müslim Horasani	
1965	Ölüme Kadar	Yes				Murat	
1965	Sevişmek Yasak	Yes					
1965	Silahların Sesi	Yes				Ali Cengiz / Çetin	Dual role
1965	Canım Sana Feda	Yes				Ahmet	
1965	Aşk ve İntikam	Yes				Osman / Nejat	Dual role
1965	Horasan'ın Üç Atlısı	Yes				Ebu Müslim Horasani	
1965	Fakir Gencin Romanı	Yes				Turgut Subaş	
1965	Satılık Kalp	Yes				Bülent	
1966	Dişi Düşman	Yes				Cengiz	
1966	Fakir Bir Kız Sevdim	Yes				Cüneyt Bakıroğlu	
1966	İntikam Uğruna	Yes				Sedat Akman	
1966	Kıskanç Kadın	Yes				Kemal Sedan	
1966	Malkoçoğlu	Yes				Ali Bey (Malkoçoğlu)	
1966	Acı Tesadüf	Yes					
1966	Karanlıklar Meleği	Yes				Kemal Dikmen	
1966	Şafakta Üç Kurşun	Yes				Murat	
1966	Ayrılık Şarkısı	Yes				Murat Aşkın	
1966	İki Yabancı	Yes				Ahmet / Tarık	Dual role
1966	Kolsuz Kahraman	Yes				Yiğit Alpago	
1966	İntikam Ateşi	Yes				Murat	
1966	Yakut Gözlü Kedi	Yes				Murat Davman	
1966	Damgalı Adam	Yes				Murat	
1966	Göklerdeki Sevgili	Yes				Timur Karaşah	
1966	Cibali Karakolu	Yes				Orhan	
1966	Affedilmeyen	Yes				Yalçın Arkın	
1966	Suçsuz Firari	Yes				Kenan Sarvan	
1966	Çıtkırıldım	Yes					
1967	Yıkılan Yuva	Yes				Ekrem Soysal	
1967	Kırbaç Altında	Yes				Selim Çelik	
1967	Malkoçoğlu Krallara Karşı	Yes				Ali Bey (Malkoçoğlu)	
1967	Alpaslan'ın Fedaisi Alpago	Yes				Alpago	
1967	Bir Şoförün Gizli Defteri	Yes				Ali	
1967	Cici Gelin	Yes				Orhan Kurtuluş	
1967	Ringo Kid	Yes				Ringo Kid	
1967	Seni Affedemem	Yes				Murat Özkut	
1967	Yüzbaşı Kemal	Yes				Orhan Şahin / Kemal	Dual role
1967	Zengin Ve Serseri	Yes				Ekrem	
1967	Hacı Murat	Yes				Murat/Hacı	
1967	Namus Borcu	Yes				Murat Karadayı	
1967	İdam Günü	Yes					
1967	Zehirli Hayat	Yes				Doğan Arkın	
1967	Pranga Mahkumu	Yes				Yüzbaşı Talat	
1967	Silahlı Paşazade	Yes				Şahin	
1968	Artık Sevmiyeceğim	Yes				Kemal	
1968	Şafak Sökmesin	Yes				Vedat Akman	
1968	Eşkiya Halil (Haydut)	Yes				Halil	
1968	Belalı Hayat	Yes				Ahmet Akyürek	
1968	Malkoçoğlu Kara Korsan	Yes				Malkoçoğlu	
1968	Gök Bayrak	Yes				Bahadır	
1968	Kader	Yes				Polat	
1968	Acı İntikam	Yes				Orhan Şahin	
1968	Köroğlu	Yes				Köroğlu / Ruşen Ali	
1968	İlk ve Son	Yes				Mecdi	
1968	Yüzbaşının Kızı	Yes				Murat Ertürk	
1968	Beş Ateşli Kadın	Yes				Murat	Bilingual film
1968	Baharda Solan Çiçek	Yes				Murat	
1968	Hacı Murat Geliyor	Yes				Murat	
1968	Kader Ayırsa Bile	Yes					
1968	Son Vurgun (Kurşunların Yağmuru)	Yes				Sedat Tüzer	
1968	Yousaf va Zulayha / Yusuf ile Züleyha / Hazreti Yusuf	Yes				Yusuf	Iranian film
1969	Sevgili Babam	Yes				Sedat Ersoy	
1969	Vatan Ve Namık Kemal	Yes				Islam Bey	
1969	İnsanlar Yaşadıkça	Yes				Ahmet / Orhan Gündoğdu	Dual role
1969	Lekeli Melek	Yes				Suat Sonderoğlu	
1969	Malkoçoğlu Akıncılar Geliyor	Yes				Malkoçoğlu	
1969	Ottoman Eagle	Yes				İslam / Ahmet	Dual role
1969	Ala Geyik	Yes				Ali	
1969	Melikşah	Yes				Ali	Bilingual film
1969	Büyük Yemin	Yes				Ali / Ahmet	Dual role
1969	Aşk Mabudesi	Yes				Ekrem Arkın	
1969	Hayat Kavgası	Yes				Murat	
1969	Malkoçoğlu Cem Sultan	Yes				Polat / Malkoçoğlu	Dual role
1970	Arım, Balım, Peteğim	Yes				Harun	
1970	Selahattin Eyyubi	Yes				Sultan Selahattin Eyyubi	Bilingual film
1970	Shirin va Farhad / Ferhat ile Şirin	Yes				Ferhat	Iranian film; Bilingual film
1970	Yarım Kalan Saadet	Yes				Ekrem Arkın	
1970	Hayatım Sana Feda	Yes				Harun	
1970	Adsız Cengaver ve Sultan Gelin	Yes				Adsiz	Bilingual film
1970	Yumurcak Köprüaltı Çocuğu	Yes				Nihat Ak	
1970	Mive-ye gonah / Hak Yolu	Yes				Ali	Iranian film; Bilingual film
1971	Vahşi Çiçek	Yes				Fikret	
1971	Hersey Oğlum İçin	Yes				Fikret	
1971	İki Esir	Yes				Murat	Bilingual film
1971	Battal Gazi Destanı	Yes				Battal Gazi, Hüseyin Gazi	Dual role
1971	Malkoçoğlu Ölüm Fedaileri	Yes				Malkoçoğlu	
1971	Fakir Aşıkların Romanı	Yes				Kemal Ersan	
1971	Cehenneme Bir Yolcu	Yes				Fikret	
1971	Severek Ayrılalım	Yes				Ömer	
1971	Küçük Sevgilim	Yes				Dr. Murat Akova	
1971	Satın Alınan Koca	Yes				Murat Uraz	
1971	Adını Anmayacağım	Yes				Engin	
1971	Oyun Bitti	Yes				Doğan	
1972	Mahkum	Yes				Kemal	
1972	Murat İle Nazlı	Yes				Murat	
1972	Hayatımın En Güzel Yılları	Yes				Murat Par	
1972	Çöl Kartalı	Yes				Captain Murat	
1972	Günahsızlar	Yes					
1972	Yaralı Kurt	Yes				Ali	
1972	Alın Yazısı	Yes				Haydar	
1972	Battal Gazi'nin İntikamı	Yes				Battal Gazi	
1972	Kara Murat: Fatih'ın Fedaisi	Yes				Kara Murat ve Ağam	Dual role
1973	The Little Cowboy	Yes				Keskin	Bilingual film
1973	Kuşçu	Yes				Kuşçu Murat	
1973	Çaresizler	Yes				Kadir	
1973	Vurgun	Yes				Mehmet	
1973	Battal Gazi Geliyor	Yes				Seyyit Battal / Battal Gazi	Dual role
1973	Gönülden Yaralılar	Yes				Murat	
1973	Yanaşma	Yes				Yanaşma Mehmet	
1973	Acı Hayat	Yes				Kerem	
1973	Kara Murat Fatih'in Fermanı	Yes				Murat	
1974	Oğul	Yes				Alişan	
1974	Belalılar	Yes				Selim	
1974	Dayı	Yes				Murat	
1974	Kin	Yes				Kenan	
1974	Bırakın Yaşayalım	Yes				Kemal	
1974	Babalık	Yes				Murat	
1974	Önce Vatan	Yes				Major Yavuz	
1974	Yalnız Adam	Yes				Murat	
1974	Battal Gazi'nin Oğlu	Yes				Battal /Battal Gazi	Dual role
1974	Ayrı Dünyalar	Yes				Fırtına Kemal	
1974	Kara Murat Ölüm Emri	Yes				Kara Murat	
1974	Karateciler İstanbul'da	Yes				Erol Arkın	Bilingual film
1975	İnsan Avcısı	Yes				Metin	
1975	Babanın Oğlu	Yes				Murat	
1975	Cemil	Yes				Cemil	
1975	Deli Yusuf	Yes				Ali	Also as action choreographer
1975	Kılıç Aslan	Yes				Kılıç Aslan / Süleyman Şah	Dual role
1975	Soysuzlar	Yes				Murat	
1975	Babacan	Yes				Şahin	
1975	Babaların Babası	Yes				Murat	
1975	Şafakta Buluşalım	Yes				Halil	
1975	Kara Murat Kara Şövalyeye Karşı	Yes				Mehmet / Kara Murat	Dual role
1976	Tek Başına	Yes	Yes			Kemal	
1976	Tuzak	Yes				Ömer Doruk	
1976	Yarınsız Adam	Yes				Murat	
1976	İki Arkadaş	Yes				Ahmet	
1976	Babanın Suçu	Yes				Kemal	
1976	Üç Kağıtçılar / Che Carambole Ragazzi	Yes				Horaz Ali	Bilingual film
1976	Deli Şahin	Yes	Yes			Deli Şahin	
1976	Hınç	Yes				Kemal	
1976	Korkusuz Cengaver	Yes				Şahin Bey	
1976	Mağlup Edilemeyenler	Yes				Murat	
1976	Kara Murat Şeyh Gaffar'a Karşı / Kara Murat, La Belva Dell'Anatolia	Yes				Kara Murat	Bilingual film
1977	Sevgili Oğlum	Yes	Yes			İskender Önal	
1977	İstasyon	Yes				Gırgır Ali	
1977	Akrep Yuvası	Yes				Komiser Kemal	
1977	Hakanlar Çarpışıyor	Yes				Olcayto, Halit and Sheikh	Triple role
1977	Güneş Ne Zaman Doğacak	Yes				Yavuz Mehmetol	
1977	Baba Ocağı	Yes				Halil Güneylioğlu	
1977	Adalet	Yes				Avukat Kemal	
1977	Satılmış Adam	Yes				Halil	
1977	Yıkılmayan Adam	Yes				Çakır	
1977	Cemil Dönüyor	Yes				Cemil	
1977	Kara Murat Denizler Hakimi	Yes				Kara Murat	
1977	Baskın	Yes				Poyraz Murat	
1978	Gelincik	Yes				Alişan	
1978	İnsanları Seveceksin	Yes				Halil	
1978	The Mine	Yes				İlyas	
1978	Baba Kartal	Yes	Yes			Kartal Arıcan	
1978	Kaplanlar Ağlamaz	Yes				Canpolat	
1978	Ölüm Görevi	Yes	Yes			Şahin	
1978	Görünmeyen Düşman	Yes	Yes			Orhan	
1978	Kara Murat Devler Savaşıyor	Yes				Kara Murat	
1978	Vahşi Gelin	Yes				Murat Yağir	
1979	Küskün Çiçek	Yes	Yes		Yes	Müffettiş Ahmet	
1979	Vatandaş Rıza	Yes	Yes		Yes	Rıza	
1979	İki Cambaz	Yes				Tayfun	
1979	Kanun Gücü	Yes	Yes	Yes		Ahmet / Hanzo	
1979	Üç Tatlı Bela	Yes	Yes			Atmaca Ahmet	
1979	Üç Sevgilim	Yes	Yes		Yes	Bahçevan Orhan	
1979	Canikom	Yes				Fikret	
1979	3 Supermen Against the Godfather	Yes				Detective Murat / Agent Brad	Dual role; Bilingual film; also as assistant director
1980	Sarışın Tehlike	Yes				Metin Tunç	
1980	Destan	Yes				Destan	
1980	Kartal Murat	Yes	Yes		Yes	Kartal Murat	
1980	Rahmet Ve Gazap	Yes				Yusuf	
1980	Rüzgar	Yes	Yes			Deliormanlı Davut	
1981	Takip	Yes				Hasan	
1981	İntikam Yemini	Yes				Seyit	
1981	Kader Arkadaşı	Yes				Yusuf	
1981	Öğretmen Kemal	Yes				Mustafa Kemal	
1981	Önce Hayaller Ölür	Yes	Yes		Yes	Kemal	
1981	Acı Günler	Yes				Cemal	
1981	Su	Yes				Murat	
1981	Unutulmayanlar	Yes				Doktor	
1982	Son Savaşçı	Yes	Yes		Yes	Murat	
1982	Dört Yanım Cehennem	Yes		Yes		Murat	
1982	Gırgır Ali	Yes		Yes		Gırgır Ali	
1982	Ölümsüz	Yes		Yes		Ali Kaya	
1982	Kelepçe	Yes				Dayı Cemil	
1982	Kanije Kalesi	Yes				Kara Pençe	
1982	Son Akın	Yes				Mehmet (Koca Memil)	
1982	Dünyayı Kurtaran Adam	Yes		Yes		Murat	
1983	Erkekçe	Yes				Gırgır Ali	
1983	İdamlık	Yes				Komiser Murat	
1983	Çöl	Yes		Yes		Kemal	
1983	En Büyük Yumruk	Yes				En Büyük Yumruk Murat	
1983	İntikam Benim	Yes	Yes		Yes	Kartal Murat	
1983	Ölüme Son Adım	Yes				Kaan	
1983	Vahşi Kan	Yes		Yes		Rıza	
1984	Yaşadıkça	Yes				Salih Eryılmaz	
1984	Ölüm Savaşçısı	Yes	Yes	Yes	Yes	Murat	
1984	Dev Kanı	Yes				Murat	
1984	Deli Fişek	Yes				Murat	
1984	Bırakın Yaşasınlar	Yes				Avcı Kemal	
1984	Kanun Kanundur	Yes	Yes			Cüneyt	
1984	Kartal Bey	Yes		Yes		Kartal Bey	
1984	Bir Kaç Güzel Gün İçin	Yes	Yes			Kemal Polat	
1984	Alev Alev	Yes				Şahin	
1985	Paramparça	Yes				Cemil Koçer	
1985	Paranın Esiri	Yes				Murat	
1985	Kanun Adamı	Yes	Yes			Advocate Murat	
1985	Kaplanlar	Yes	Yes			Murat	
1985	Bin Defa Ölürüm	Yes				Kemal	
1985	Doruk	Yes				Captain Cemil	
1985	Kaçış	Yes	Yes	Yes		Murat	
1985	Kahreden Gençlik	Yes				Kemal	
1985	Biz Bir Aiyeliz	Yes				Halil	
1985	Katiller De Ağlar	Yes				Yusuf Şahin	
1985	Mahkum	Yes	Yes			Yakup	
1986	Sert Adam	Yes				Avukat Kemal Güçlü	
1986	Tokatçılar	Yes				Cüneyt	
1986	Gırgır Hafiye	Yes	Yes	Yes		Gırgır Ali	
1986	Ölümsüz Aşk	Yes				Cemil	
1986	Kavga	Yes	Yes			Kemal	
1986	Babasının Oğlu	Yes	Yes			Cüneyt	
1986	Yalnız Adam	Yes	Yes			Cüneyt	
1986	Kanca	Yes				Major Şahin	
1986	Sokak Kavgacısı	Yes				Murat	
1986	Kral Affetmez	Yes	Yes			Seyit	
1986	Silah Arkadaşları	Yes			Yes	Komutan	
1986	Vazife Uğruna	Yes				Tahsin	
1986	Melek Yüzlü Cani / Nefret	Yes				Kosimer Murat	
1987	Sen Ağlama	Yes				Tayfun Karaoğlu	
1987	Oğulcan	Yes	Yes	Yes		Bekir	Direct-to-video film
1987	Sevdam Benim	Yes				Polat	
1987	Son Kahramanlar	Yes	Yes	Yes	Yes	Kaan Ken	Direct-to-video film
1987	Asılacak Adam	Yes				Kartal	
1987	İnsan Avcıları	Yes		Yes		Cüneyt	
1987	Cehennem Ateşi	Yes				Major	
1987	Dört Hergele	Yes				Mozart	Direct-to-video film
1987	Küçük Dostum	Yes	Yes				Direct-to-video film
1987	Şeytanın Oğulları	Yes	Yes	Yes		Cüneyt	
1987	Damga	Yes				Kemal Kalmıkçı	
1987	Sürgündeki Adam	Yes	Yes			Kemal	
1987	Tanık	Yes	Yes	Yes		Avukat	Direct-to-video film
1987	Dökülen Yaplaklar	Yes	Yes	Yes		Rıza	Direct-to-video film
1988	Yasak İlişki	Yes				Serdar	
1988	Yaşamak	Yes				Doctor Cemal	Direct-to-video film
1988	Bombacı	Yes	Yes			Gırgır Ali	
1988	Şafak Sökerken	Yes	Yes			Kemal	
1988	Babam Ve Ben	Yes					
1988	Muhteşem Serseri	Yes				Boksör/Fedai	Direct-to-video film
1988	Kızım ve Ben / Gurbet Kadını	Yes				Vedat	
1989	Eski Silah	Yes		Yes		Murat	
1989	Av	Yes				Bekir Arslan	
1989	Doktorlar	Yes		Yes	Yes	Doctor Cemal	TV series
1989	Polis Dosyası	Yes				Cemil	
1990	İki Başlı Dev	Yes				Cengiz Özkan	
1993	Merhamet	Yes		Yes			TV series
1995	Playing with Death	Yes					Iranian film
1998	Gülün Bittiği Yer	Yes				Adam	
2003	Serseri	Yes				Şahin	TV series
2006	Turks in Space	Yes				Murat	
2007	Natuk Baytan Belgeseli	Yes				Himself	Documentary
2007	Hicran Sokağı	Yes				Bekir	
2007	Çılgın Dersane	Yes				Hadi	
2007	Çılgın Dersane Kampta	Yes				Hadi	
2008	Kırmızı Işık	Yes				Ekrem	TV series
2008	Afacanlar Sınıfı	Yes				Fahri Hoca	
2012–2013	Harem	Yes				Murat's father	TV series; 1 episode
2014	Gulyabani	Yes				Şahin Bey	
2014	Panzehir	Yes				Kara Cemal	
2020	Kuruluş: Osman	Yes				Leader of White Beardeds	TV series

Awards
Preceded by Fikret Hakan	Golden Orange Award for Best Actor; 1969 for İnsanlar Yaşadıkça	Succeeded by Yılmaz Güney
Preceded by Kadir İnanır	Golden Boll Award for Best Actor; 1973 for Yaralı Kurt	Succeeded by not held
Preceded by Erkan Yücel	Golden Orange Award for Best Actor; 1976 for Mağlup Edilemeyenler	Succeeded by Kemal Sunal
