= Feri Cansel =

Turkish Cypriot actress (1944–1983)

- Poster of the 1978 Turkish film Kendin pişir kendin ye (Self-service) starring Feri Cansel
- Born: 7 July 1944; Lefkoşa (Nicosia), Cyprus
- Died: 2 September 1983 (aged 39); Istanbul, Turkey
- Occupation: Actress

Feriha "Feri" Cansel (7 July 1944 – 2 September 1983) was a Turkish Cypriot actress.

She was born in Lefkoşa (Nicosia), Cyprus and spent her early youth in the United Kingdom, acquiring British citizenship. She became a hairdresser in London. Once settled in Turkey, she also obtained Turkish citizenship, marrying for convenience the janitor of the block of apartments in İstanbul where she lived concluding for that purpose. She started in show business as a stage stripper, and she appeared in her first film in 1964.

She was the mother of actress Zümrüt Cansel.

== Career ==
She started her acting career with secondary roles in Turkish cinema's mainstream movies, and who attained fame after she started to appear in seks filmleri, a particular genre of which had developed in Turkey in the mid-1970s to last until the eve of the 1980s. Her name became synonymous with the then rising wave of films of the genre, with a much reduced story line and a soft- to mid-hardcore pornographical content arranged to match the tastes of local audiences often disguised as comedy films.

According to the Sinematürk database of Turkish films, Feri Cansel's career spanned 18 years during which she acted in 136 films. 120 of these films can be categorized as belonging in the erotic line. Cansel herself, on the other hand, claimed in 1978 that she had by then appeared in 350 erotic movies. Both figures could make Cansel win the career-long title for the highest number of erotic Turkish movies made by any actor/actress.

The difference between the two figures is explained by the extensive practice at the time by the film producers, who viewed films that were shot not as parts of a single work but merely as source material for production of multiple films, to cut and paste. Erotic scenes, especially, were often cut and pasted to assemble new films from various parts of existing ones. This peculiar practice was called "parça" (literally the "fragment"), and the term was extended into the movie theaters themselves to include the practice by the operators of inserting hardcore material, which was European most of the time, into Turkish "erotic" films.

Cansel's liberal use of foul language in her films earned her the nickname of Emmanuelle of Kasımpaşa, a popular quarter of Istanbul notorious for its peculiar speech rich in slang.

She was killed by her fiancé in Istanbul in 1983. Cansel was survived by her daughter Zumrut Cansel who also embarked on a brief acting career after the murder of her mother.
