= Erler Film =

- Type: Private
- Industry: Film
- Founded: 1960, Turkey
- Founder: Türker İnanoğlu
- Headquarters: Kavacık, Beykoz, Turkey
- Website: www.erlerfilm.com

Erler Film is a Turkish movie production company established in 1960 in Istanbul by the Turkish film director and producer Türker İnanoğlu. Based today in Kavacık, Beykoz, it is the oldest film company in the country, which is still in business today.

For more than 45 years, Erler Film produced feature films on a wide spectrum, from black-and-white to color movies, from domestic to co-productions, from history movies to comedies. During the 1960s and 1970s, it was the biggest Turkish film production company. From 1990 on, it started producing TV series for the Turkish television channels with the taste of cinema.

It produced more than 200 movies, among them 21 in co-production with Greece, Italy and Iran.

== TV series on air ==
- Cennet Mahallesi (The Paradise Quarter) Saturdays at 20:00 on Show TV
- Yabancı Damat Fridays at 20:00 on Kanal D
- The Borders of Love (Greek version of the same series) Mondays at 21:00 on Greek Mega TV
- Ölümüne Sevdalar (Deadly Loves) Show TV
