= Türker İnanoğlu =

Turkish film producer and director (1936–2024)

- Born: 18 May 1936; Safranbolu, Karabük, Turkey
- Died: 2 April 2024 (aged 87); Istanbul, Turkey
- Resting place: Kanlıca Cemetery
- Occupations: Screenwriter, film director, film producer
- Spouses: Filiz Akın (m. 1964; div. 1974) Gülşen Bubikoğlu (m. 1974)
- Children: 2

Türker İnanoğlu (18 May 1936 – 2 April 2024) was a Turkish screenwriter, film director and producer.

== Personal life and death ==
İnanoğlu married first the film actress Filiz Akın, and after his divorce Gülşen Bubikoğlu, another former Turkish movie star. He had two children, a son, İlker, from his former marriage and a daughter, Zeynep, from his last marriage.

İnanoğlu died in Istanbul on 2 April 2024, at the age of 87. On 4 April 2024, he was interred at Kanlıca Cemetery following the religious service at Barbaros Hayrettin Pasha Mosque in Levent.

== Career ==
İnanoğlu came in contact with the cinema when he was a student at the Istanbul Academy of Applied Fine Arts in 1957. After working as assistant to directors Ömer Lütfi Akat and Nişan Hançer in eleven movies, he directed in 1960 his first feature Senden Ayrı Yaşayamam.

After directing nine movies in the studios of Yeşilçam, the Turkish Hollywood, İnanoğlu established in 1959 his own film company Erler Film, which is today the oldest film production company in Turkey still in business. Since then, he produced 126 black-and-white and color films, among them 21 co-productions with Greece, Italy and Iran. He executed also the productions of American, Japanese, French and German filmmakers’ documentary films shot in Turkey. Until now, he directed 82 movies.

In 1979, İnanoğlu started the video business in Turkey by founding the first video company, Ulusal Video. His company distributed video copies of domestic movies to around 1,500 video clubs in Turkey and abroad. He contributed for five years to aid the survival of Turkish cinema, which found itself in a big economic crisis.

To produce news and entertainment programs for the television, he established a studio in 1985. In this studio, İnanoğlu produced very popular programs like Bir Başka Gece ("Another night"), Hodri Meydan ("Challenge"), Gecenin getirdikleri ("Things came by night") for the then only TV channel in Turkey, TRT. Later, following the opening of private TV channels, he continued to produce TV programs for channels like Star TV, Show TV, Kanal 6 and ATV, totaling to 10,000 hours.

In 1994, İnanoğlu became president of the channel ATV and helped it become a leader in the sector. Later, he established a cable TV channel, Süper Kanal.

İnanoğlu co-founded sectoral associations and served as their chairman. Later, he was the honorary president of the Turkish Association of Owners of Cinema Arts, SESAM. In 1997, he set up the Türker İnanoğlu Cinema Foundation and transferred all the copyrights on his productions to this charity institution with social and educational goals for the Turkish cinema.

== Selected filmography ==
=== Screenwriter ===
- İçimizden Biri (Someone from Us), 1960
- Şafakta Buluşalım (Let’s meet at dawn), 1961

=== Director ===
- Sonbahar (The Autumn), 1959
- Senden Ayrı Yaşayamam (I Can’t Live Apart From You), 1960
- Küçük Kahraman (The Little Brave), 1960
- İçimizden Biri (Someone from Us), 1960
- Küçük Beyefendi (Little Gentleman), 1962
- Kiralık Koca (Husband for rent), 1963
- Bulunmaz Uşak (The Perfect Servant), 1963
- Bahriyeli Ahmet (Ahmet, the Mariner), 1963
- Yankesici Kız (The Pitpocket Girl), 1964
- Mirasyedi (The Heir)
- Satılık Kalp (Heart for sale), 1965
- Acı Tesadüf (Bitter Coincidence), 1966
- İdam Mahkumu (The Prisoner for Death Penalty), 1966
- Kaderin Cilvesi (Twist of Fate), 1967
- Namus Borcu (Honor Due), 1967
- Evlat Uğruna (For the Sake of Children), 1967
- İstanbul Tatili (Holiday in Istanbul), 1968
- Sabah Yıldızı (The Morning Star), 1968
- Soyguncular (The Robbers), 1973
- Bizim Kız (Our Girl), 1977

=== Producer ===
- İçimizden Biri (Someone from Us), 1960
- Çöpçatan (The Matchmaker), 1961
- Küçük Beyefendi (Little Gentleman), 1962
- Yolcu (The Passenger), 1963
- Bulunmaz Uşak (The Perfect Servant), 1963
- Bahriyeli Ahmet (Ahmet, the Mariner), 1963
- Yankesici Kız (The Pitpocket Girl), 1964
- Satılık Kalp (Heart for sale), 1965
- İdam Mahkumu (The Prisoner for Death Penalty), 1966
- Acı Tesadüf (Bitter Coincidence), 1966
- İntikam Uğruna (For the Sake of Revenge), 1966
- Namus Borcu (Honor Due), 1967
- Evlat Uğruna (For the Sake of Children), 1967
- İstanbul Tatili (Holiday in Istanbul), 1968
- Almanyalı Yarim (My Darling From Germany), 1974
- Bizim Kız (Our Girl), 1977
- Süpermenler (3 Supermen Against Godfather in Europe, Tres supermanes contra el padrino in Spain), 1979
- Beyaz Ölüm (White Death), 1983
- Tele Kızlar (Call Girls), 1985
- Selamsız Bandosu (Selamsız’s Band), 1987 (co-production)
- Kaçamak (The Love Affair), 1988

=== Television series producer ===
- Tatlı Kaçıklar (Sweet Nutcases), 1996
- İkinci Bahar (Second Spring), 1999
- Bizim Otel (Our Hotel), 2001
- Hastayım Doktor (I am Sick, Doctor), 2002
- Yabancı Damat (The Foreign Groom), 2004
- Anne Babamla Evlensene (Mommy, Marry My Daddy), 2005
