= List of Muhteşem Yüzyıl episodes =

Turkish TV series

Muhteşem Yüzyıl is a Turkish historical television series created by Meral Okay. The series is based on the life of Suleiman the Magnificent (the longest-reigning sultan of the Ottoman Empire) and his wife, Hürrem Sultan, a former slave who became sultana. It chronicles the power struggles among members of the imperial house.

The series premiered on January 5, 2011, on Show TV. Its first season and 16 episodes of the second season were aired on the channel, and the rest of the series was broadcast on Star TV. Each episode is 90 to 150 minutes long. Producer Timur Savcı said in July 2013 that the series would end in March 2014, but it concluded with 139 episodes on June 11, 2014.

== Series overview ==
Season	Episodes	Originally released			Rating	Rank
Season	Episodes	First released	Last released	Network	Rating	Rank
1	24	January 5, 2011	June 22, 2011	Show TV	15.76	1
2	39	September 14, 2011	June 6, 2012	Show TV/Star TV	14.20	1
3	40	September 12, 2012	June 19, 2013	Star TV	13.70	1
4	36	September 18, 2013	June 11, 2014	Star TV	12.06	1

== Episodes ==
=== Season 1 (2011) ===
Süleyman is informed while hunting that his father, Sultan Selim, has died. He rides to Constantinople with his best friend, Pargalı İbrahim, to take the throne. Alexandra, a Ruthenian girl, is sold to the Topkapı Palace in Istanbul, she is accepted into the Sultan's harem. Nigar Kalfa, a harem leader, tells Alexandra the benefits of being a favorite of the sultan and bearing a son if she follows the rules. Alexandra attracts the sultan's attention, spends a night with him, and eventually falls in love with him. After converting to Islam, Süleyman changes her name to Hürrem. She gives birth to her first son, Mehmed, and rises to the head of the court. Mahidevran, mother of Süleyman's eldest son Mustafa, worries when she notices that Süleyman is not spending time with her anymore. A year later, Hürrem gives birth to her daughter, Mihrimah. Süleyman leaves for a campaign in Belgrade and kills the husband of Victoria, who later enters the harem to kill the sultan. Süleyman arranges the marriage of his sister, Hatice Sultan, to a vizier's son, not realizing Hatice and İbrahim are in love. İbrahim resigns as grand vizier to not cause Hatice any pain, but Süleyman orders him back and approves his marriage to Hatice. Leo, Hürrem's fiancé before she arrived in Istanbul, arrives in an attempt to find her. Hürrem learns about his presence after giving birth to her third child Selim. She tries to hide the truth, but İbrahim uses it as against her. Victoria, now renamed Sadika, becomes a trusted servant and eventually tries to assassinate Süleyman while he visits İbrahim and Hatice. Because of the rivalry and developing hostility between İbrahim and Hürrem, he tries to blackmail and poison her.

No. overall	No. in season	Title	Directed by	Written by	Original release date	Ratings
1	1	"Episode 1"	Taylan Brothers	Meral Okay	January 5, 2011	10.87
Süleyman is informed of his father's death, and returns to Istanbul, where he ascends the throne. He brings his best friend Pargalı Ibrahim with him to Topkapi Palace. He greets his mother, Hafsa Sultan, now the valide sultan of the Ottoman Empire. Mahidevran Sultan, mother of Süleyman's son Mustafa, arrives at the palace with her son. Alexandra, a Ruthenian girl, is kidnapped in a Tatar slave raid after witnessing her whole family and her fiancé get killed. She is sold to the palace and rebels against the rules. Nigar Kalfa, lady of the harem, convinces her to behave and become a favorite like Ayşe Hatun. Alexandra attracts the attention of Süleyman, but when Daye Hatun, Hafsa's companion, reports of Alex's claim to make Süleyman her slave, Hafsa sends Mahidevran to Süleyman's private chamber the night he is expecting Alexandra.
2	2	"Episode 2"	Taylan Brothers	Meral Okay	January 12, 2011	15.26
Süleyman becomes angry at Hafsa for sending Mahidevran to the private chamber when he was expecting Alexandra. Angry at being turned away, Alexandra starts a pillow fight in the harem, and the girls are forced to clean up their mess and punished. Alexandra is again summoned to spend the night with Süleyman, and the two share a passionate night and Süleyman renames Alexandra as Hürrem ("who brings joy to one's face"). She purposely keeps him occupied during the weekly night that he traditionally spends with Mahidevran, leaving Mahidevran devastated. Mahidevran then purposely provokes Hürrem so that she will be sent to the dungeon for disobeying her, but Süleyman orders her released and gifts her the ring he designed that Mahidevran originally expected to receive.
3	3	"Episode 3"	Taylan Brothers	Meral Okay	January 19, 2011	16.62
Mahidevran finds out that Hürrem received Süleyman's ring, and becomes angry. She collapses while fighting with Hürrem, and the doctor later reveals that she's pregnant. Hürrem is jealous when she hears this news, and picks a fight with Ayşe that Nigar breaks up. Mahidevran later has Ayşe steal the ring back from Hürrem. Nigar suspects Ayşe, and reports her to Ibrahim, who gets the ring back from Mahidevran. Hürrem asks Süleyman to help her convert to a Muslim the night before Mahidevran suffers a miscarriage. On her way to see Süleyman, Mahidevran sees Hürrem leaving, and beats her unconscious, blaming Hürrem for losing her baby.
4	4	"Episode 4"	Taylan Brothers	Meral Okay	January 26, 2011	16.77
The beaten Hürrem is found by Nigar, Sumbul and Daye. Daye decides to hide what happened from the Sultan. She tells everything to Valide, and she scolds Mahidevran. In the evening, the Sultan orders his favorite to be called to him, but she refuses. Suleiman becomes furious and goes to Hürrem’s room, where he sees the reason for her refusal. Hürrem admits to Suleiman that Mahidevran beat her. The relationship between the Sultan and Mahidevran completely deteriorates, and Suleiman decides to send Mahidevran to the old palace. Until her recovery, Hürrem moves into Suleiman's chambers. Yielding to Valide’s persuasion, the Sultan decides not to expel Mahidevran. Hürrem recovers and returns to the room with Ayşe. Hatice and Ibrahim continue their secret meetings. Suleiman gives the order to prepare for the campaign against Hungary. Hatice promises to wait for Ibrahim. King Lajos does not take Suleiman's campaign seriously. Tension grows between Hürrem and Ibrahim. Suleiman goes on a hike.
5	5	"Episode 5"	Taylan Brothers	Meral Okay	February 2, 2011	14.94
In the absence of the Sultan, Valide decides to get rid of Hürrem by marrying her to the son of Suleiman's former teacher, Lala Kasim Pasha. During a walk in the garden, Hürrem is shown to her fiancé. Suleiman and Ibrahim are developing a plan for an attack on Belgrade. At a feast hosted by Valide, Hürrem is informed about her upcoming marriage. Hürrem opposes this and, in order to stay in the palace, says that she is pregnant. Valide is sure that Hurrem’s claim is a lie, and tells a physician to examine her; however, the physician confirms Hürrem is pregnant. Harem is surprised, and Mahidevran is upset. With the help of Nigar, Hürrem writes a letter to the Sultan, in which she reports on her situation. Refusing to be embarrassed, Valide puts the engagement on hold until Suleiman returns. Suleiman captures one fortress on the way to Belgrade, in which the wedding of Ariel, the guard of Lajos' castle, is being celebrated. Lajos manages to escape, and Suleiman kills Ariel. The doctor prescribes heart drops for Mahidevran, and she thinks about a new plan to get rid of her rival. Valide decides to marry Hatice. In the harem, in honor of the unborn child, Suleiman and Hürrem are organizing a holiday.
6	6	"Episode 6"	Taylan Brothers	Meral Okay	February 9, 2011	16.49
1521 – Suleiman's army captures Belgrade during an assault. Suleiman returns to the palace and learns the good news about Hürrem's pregnancy. Quarrels between Mahidevran and Hürrem do not stop. The last straw of Mahidevran’s patience comes when, while greeting the Sultan in the harem, Suleiman passes by her. After a long separation, the Sultan does not let his beloved go. In the evening, Ibrahim meets Hatice in the fig orchard, and they admit to each other that the separation was unbearable. Mahidevran's hatred for Hürrem grows, and she decides to take a desperate step. During dinner with the Sultan, Hurrem becomes ill. Suleiman understands that she was poisoned, but Hurrem and the child manage to be saved. Valide hears her son calling Hürrem his sultana, and understands that the Russian slave has achieved her goal. Mahidevran is afraid of exposure and orders Gulşah to get rid of Hasibe, who brought poisoned food to the Sultan. Ibrahim investigates, finds out the truth and tries to hide it from the Sultan. But Suleiman overhears the conversation between Ibrahim and Gulşah and goes to Mahidevran to punish her. There he hears Mahidevran telling Mustafa about her love for the Sultan, and decides to not punish Mahidevran for Mustafa's sake. In the morning, Hürrem asks Ibrahim how he could allow the poison to get into the Sultan's chambers, but Ibrahim tells her that the matter is closed.
7	7	"Episode 7"	Taylan Brothers	Meral Okay	February 16, 2011	17.60
After the poisoning attempt, Valide orders Hürrem to be given separate chambers and personal slaves. Mahidevran becomes desperate. Hürrem demands that Maria become her maid. Suleiman is preparing a new campaign but, contrary to the opinion of the West, he is going to conquer the Greek island of Rhodes - the possession of the Knights Hospitaller, and not Buda. Hürrem learns that while she was ill, Maria converted to Islam and was renamed Gülnihal. Hürrem is furious, believing that Gülnihal is aiming for her place, but Gülnihal swears that she never thought of anything like that. Suleiman learns about his mother’s attempt to get rid of Hürrem in his absence. Hürrem understands that Hatice is in love with Ibrahim. Having learned that Hurrem saw him with the Sultan's sister, Ibrahim advises Hürrem to remember her place. Hürrem tells Ibrahim that at any moment she can tell everything to the ruler, and he will punish his presumptuous friend. Ibrahim becomes furious and decides to take revenge on Hürrem: he sends Gülnihal to Suleiman's private chamber. While the Sultan spends the night with Gülnihal, Hürrem gives birth to a son. Valide orders the baby to be taken away from Hürrem, to her dismay. Mahidevran, by order of Valide, appears at the naming ceremony. The Sultan names his son Mehmed. Gülnihal asks Hürrem for forgiveness for not being able to help her during childbirth, but hides where she really was.
8	8	"Episode 8"	Taylan Brothers	Meral Okay	February 23, 2011	17.34
Ibrahim gives the order to Nigar to inform Hürrem that on the night of her birth, a concubine visited the Sultan’s chambers. Hürrem orders Gülnihal to find out the name of this concubine. Ibrahim gives Hatice a brooch in the shape of a butterfly. Valide notices the gift, but Hürrem helps Hatice out, claiming that she gave the brooch. Valide advises her daughter to stay away from Hürrem. In the presence of Mahidevran, Valide gives Hürrem her necklace, and Hatice gives Hürrem her bracelet. Suleiman gifts Hürrem a sable cape in honor of Mehmed's birth. The relationship between Mahidevran and Valide deteriorates. Gülnihal again goes to the halvet. Hürrem figures out that Gülnihal visited the Sultan’s chambers and beats her. Valide finds a husband for Hatice - the son of Piri Mehmed Pasha, Mehmed Çelebi, and the Sultan gives his consent to the marriage. Hatice finds out about this and falls into unconsciousness. At night, in her delirium, she calls for Ibrahim. Hürrem sends the sable cape to Gülnihal, claiming to ask for forgiveness, but that night, Gülnihal wakes up and finds half her face burned off because the cape was poisoned. Daye figures out that Gülnihal was poisoned by Hürrem; though she plays innocent, Hürrem secretly revels in her victory. Near Hatice's bed, Mahidevran and Hürrem quarrel again. To punish Hürrem, Valide has Mehmed taken away and fed by a wet nurse.
9	9	"Episode 9"	Taylan Brothers	Meral Okay	March 2, 2011	15.89
Suleiman is preparing to march on Rhodes. King Lajos spreads a rumor that the Ottoman army is afraid to march on the Kingdom of Hungary. On behalf of Lajos, Ariel's widow Victoria goes to Istanbul to kill Suleiman. One of the Sultan's close associates, Matrakçi Nasuh Efendi, finds Victoria on the street, not knowing who she really is. With the help of Ibrahim, Victoria ends up in the harem. Hatice misses Ibrahim. He promises to look into the situation, but Hatice tells him that she cannot disobey her mother and brother. Nigar finds a healer for Hürrem who makes amulets and spells for wishes. Hürrem asks to make her the most powerful woman in the harem, but the healer refuses, citing the fact that Hürrem is pregnant. Suleiman asks Ibrahim to send out the news of the engagement of Hatice and Mehmed Çelebi. Unable to come to terms with her hated marriage, Hatice attempts suicide by drinking poison, but Gulfem saves her. Preparations for Hatice's engagement are in full swing. Ibrahim suspects that Mehmed Çelebi is seriously ill. Hürrem informs the Sultan that she is expecting a child again. The celebration in honor of Hatice's engagement ends with a fire in the nursery in which Mehmed and Mustafa are located.
10	10	"Episode 10"	Taylan Brothers	Meral Okay	March 16, 2011	15.72
Victoria carries Mustafa and Mehmed out of the fire. Hürrem accuses Mahidevran and Mustafa of the fire, but the Sultan puts Hürrem in her place. In gratitude for saving her grandchildren, Valide takes Victoria into her service, gives her a new name - Sadika. Ibrahim promises Hatice to find a way out. Hürrem tries to ask for forgiveness from the Sultan, but he does not accept it. Suleiman decides to go on a campaign to Rhodes. During farewell, Suleiman passes by Hürrem, and Ibrahim fails to meet Hatice. Soon the harem receives news of the death of the Sultan near Rhodes. The harem is in mourning, Hürrem is in danger of miscarriage, but the news of the Sultan’s death is not confirmed. Suleiman is close to victory. The Grand Master of the Hospitaller Order invites Suleiman's cousin, a Christian from birth, to leave the island, but he rejects the offer, considering Rhodes his home. Nigar advises Hürrem to behave with more restraint. Mahidevran tells Nigar that she needs to choose who she wants to serve. Suleiman's army captures the Rhodes fortress. Hürrem goes into labor. During prayer, an assassination attempt was made on Suleiman, the victim of which was Ibrahim.
11	11	"Episode 11"	Taylan Brothers	Meral Okay	March 23, 2011	17.29
Hürrem gives birth to a girl. Valide gives her granddaughter the name Mihrimah. Suleiman is angry that the attempt on his life was committed by someone from the Sultan's family. Mahidevran rejoices and tells Hürrem that she could not give birth to a son, as she promised. In response, Hürrem says that Mahidevran will not be able to give birth to even a girl, since the Sultan no longer calls her to him, and Hürrem herself will give birth to many more sons. The report sent by Sadika to King Lajos is intercepted, but cannot be read. Suleiman makes a tempting offer to the Grand Master: he will retain his former life in Rhodes in exchange for the extradition of Suleiman's cousin Murad and his family. The master swears that a descendant of the Ottoman family moved to Malta. To gain the favor of the harem, Hürrem organizes a holiday. Mahidevran is unhappy that her rival is in charge of the harem. While trying to escape, the Sultan's guard grabs Murad and part of his family. Only his wife and youngest son manage to escape. Suleiman executes Cem's son, Sultan Murad, and his children. The Sultan's army returns to Istanbul victoriously. Hürrem asks for forgiveness from the Sultan for not being able to give birth to a son, but Suleiman is fascinated by Mihrimah and therefore is not the least bit upset. During classes with Mustafa, Mehmed Çelebi becomes ill. He swears that he has a common cold, but Ibrahim is sure that Hatice’s fiancé is sick with consumption. In Ibrahim's room, the Sultan finds a love letter. He orders the guards to seize Ibrahim and bring him to him.
12	12	"Episode 12"	Taylan Brothers	Meral Okay	March 30, 2011	17.63
In the fig orchard, during a secret meeting with Hatice, Ibrahim is grabbed by a guard. At a holiday in the harem, a new quarrel is brewing between Hürrem and Mahidevran, but it is quickly stopped by Hatice. Before rewarding Ibrahim for his faithful service, Suleiman gives his friend a test, which he successfully passes. At the council of the Divan, Ibrahim receives the position of Grand Vizier. This appointment enrages the other viziers. The former Grand Vizier Piri Pasha advises him in the future not to wait for the government to abandon him, but to renounce power himself. Ibrahim receives confirmation from the doctor that Mehmed Çelebi has consumption, and informs the Sultan and Valide about this. The harem is concerned about Mustafa's illness. Mahidevran believes that Mehmed Çelebi managed to infect her son, but the doctor denies this. Suleiman refuses to call off the wedding and Ibrahim decides to return to Parga. Under pressure from Valide, Suleiman calls Mahidevran for Thursday night.
13	13	"Episode 13"	Taylan Brothers	Meral Okay	April 6, 2011	15.97
Ibrahim travels to Parga, where he meets his father and twin brother Niko. Suleiman receives a farewell letter from Ibrahim, in which the Grand Vizier renounces all positions and apologizes for his love for Hatice. Hatice herself also receives a letter from Ibrahim, in which he asks his beloved for forgiveness for not being able to keep his word and leaving her. Suleiman is furious and believes that Ibrahim has betrayed him. Valide and Suleiman boycott Hatice. Hürrem asks Valide to forgive her daughter and tells her that Ibrahim and Hatice love each other. Valide is furious, believing that Ibrahim is unworthy of her daughter. Suleiman satisfies his mother’s demand for Thursday night: Mahidevran actually spends the night in the Sultan’s chambers, but he no longer touches her. Mahidevran, who had been lying alone in the Sultan’s bed all night, returning to her place, stumbles upon Hürrem. Suleiman learns about the lawlessness that Ferhat Pasha is committing and decides to take action. Sadika is caught by Ayşe smuggling messages to Lajos; she kills Ayşe to protect her secret. Hürrem is accused of Ayşe's murder, as she had threatened to kill her the day before. The children are taken away from Hürrem and she is locked in her chambers until the circumstances are clarified. Suleiman sends his messengers in pursuit of Ibrahim to Parga. Hatice begs her brother to forgive her beloved, but the Sultan does not listen to his sister’s entreaties. Ibrahim decides to return to Istanbul. Valide tells his son about the murder of Ayşe, and Suleiman goes to Hürrem to demand an explanation.
14	14	"Episode 14"	Taylan Brothers	Meral Okay	April 13, 2011	16.88
Suleiman does not believe Hürrem and, together with little Mihrimah, decides to send her to the old palace while Mehmed stays with his father. Ibrahim, accompanied by his father and brother, returns to Istanbul. Suleiman forgives his friend and agrees to his marriage to Hatice. Hürrem asks Hatice for help. Beyhan Sultan, Suleiman's sister and Ferhat Pasha's wife, tells Valide that her husband was slandered. Valide tells her son about the conversation with Beyhan. At the council of Divan, Ibrahim decides to save Ferhat’s life, but deprives him of all positions and privileges, sending him as governor to Semendir. Hürrem asks Ibrahim for help, but the Grand Vizier tells her that she deserves it. Hürrem and Mihrimah go to the old palace with Gülnihal. Ibrahim does not believe in Hürrem’s guilt and is convinced of this. Sumbul and Nigar are approached by Ruhsar Hatun, who saw the murder of Ayşe and claims that Hürrem is innocent; they bring her to Ibrahim to share her account. But Ibrahim is in no hurry to tell the ruler the good news. He arrives at the old palace and offers Hürrem a deal. Leo, Hurrem's former fiancé, arrives in Istanbul to find his love. Matrakçı meets Leo.
15	15	"Episode 15"	Taylan Brothers	Meral Okay	April 20, 2011	17.51
Ibrahim offers Hürrem a deal: she must publicly ask Mahidevran for forgiveness and kiss her hem. The Sultan calls Gulfem to his place. Mahidevran finds out about this and becomes furious. Due to the dissatisfaction of the concubines, Daye moves Sadika into the shared hall with the other concubines. Sadika is outraged, but Nigar explains to her that only the favorites of Suleiman will be able to have a private bedroom. Sadika asks Sumbul to help her become the Sultan's favorite. Unable to bear Mehmed's suffering, Hatice decides to take him to visit his mother. She persuades Hürrem to do everything that is required of her in order to return to Topkapi. Hürrem agrees to the deal and returns to the palace. The celebration of the engagement of Hatice and Ibrahim begins in the palace. The appearance of Hürrem enrages Mahidevran. Rumors quickly spread throughout the harem that Hürrem has been acquitted. Mahidevran goes to the sultan's halfway house, but her place has already been taken by Hürrem. Suleiman gives Hatice and Ibrahim a palace and appoints Ibrahim to the post of beylerbey of Rumelia. Hürrem learns that her innocence was proved, and realizes that Ibrahim set her up. Sadika is being prepared for the Sultan. To prevent Hürrem from interfering with her plans, Valide takes Hürrem with her to inspect Hatice's palace. The Grand Vizier hires Leo to paint the palace.
16	16	"Episode 16"	Taylan Brothers	Meral Okay	April 27, 2011	17.00
Valide, Hatice and Hürrem inspect Hatice's palace, donated by Suleiman. While walking in the garden, Mehmed falls into the pool, but is saved by Mahidevran. Sadika, taking advantage of the halvet with Suleiman, is going to kill him, but the news of the incident in the garden ruins her plans. Leo is at the palace when Hürrem is there, and recognizes her voice, but doesn't see her face. Suleiman and Hürrem thank Mahidevran for saving Mehmed. Hürrem finds out that Sadika visited the ruler’s chambers on the orders of Valide, and decides to get rid of her. Hürrem persuades Hatice to take Sadika to her palace after her wedding with Ibrahim. Mahidevran becomes ill, and Gulşah tells the harem that her mistress is expecting a child to upset Hürrem. Valide invites a midwife to examine Mahidevran. Mahidevran, realizing that she is not pregnant since she has not been with the Sultan for a long time, reluctantly agrees to an examination, which confirms that she is not pregnant. Meanwhile, Hürrem finds out that she is expecting a child again and informs Valide about this. While transmitting information, Sadika's accomplice tries to rape her, but Sadika manages to escape. Ibrahim convinces Suleiman to allow Leo to paint his portrait. Suleiman poses for Leo in the garden, where Hürrem comes with the joyful news of her pregnancy. Leo finally sees Hürrem, and realizes she's Alexandra.
17	17	"Episode 17"	Taylan Brothers	Meral Okay	May 4, 2011	16.67
Valide is planning wedding celebrations in honor of Hatice and Ibrahim. The Janissaries are unhappy with the large expenses for Ibrahim's wedding. During the celebration of the wedding of Hatice and Ibrahim, Hürrem goes into labor. She gives birth to another son, whom Suleiman names Selim. Mahidevran again observes the triumph of her rival, but still comes to the naming ceremony and gives Selim an amulet against the evil eye. Gulșah, seeing Mahidevran's suffering, offers to kill Hürrem, but Mahidevran rejects the offer. The Doge of Venice sends Ibrahim a wedding gift: a mahogany table. Hatice is shocked and pleasantly surprised by the convenience of the gift. After the birth of Selim, Suleiman gives Hürrem two lovebirds at a picnic. Hürrem tells in the harem that these parrots are a symbol of her and Suleiman’s love. Mahidevran warns her that no matter how many sons she gives birth to, Mustafa will still remain the heir to the throne. Matrakçi makes an appointment for Sadika in the garden. Hatice invites her brother's entire family to his palace. Valide is dissatisfied with the interior of Hatice's palace. Suleiman asks to invite the artist who painted the walls in his sister’s palace. At a dinner at Hatice's palace, Hürrem recognizes her ex-fiancé Leo, whom she believed to be dead.
18	18	"Episode 18"	Taylan Brothers	Meral Okay	May 11, 2011	13.64
Hurrem, seeing Leo, loses consciousness. Having come to her senses, she remembers the attack of the Crimean Tatars on the village and the murder of her relatives. Hatice asks Hürrem to explain the reason for her unrest, but Hürrem remains silent. To annoy Hürrem, Mahidevran asks Valide for permission to give her Hatice’s chambers. Seeing Matrakçi's affection, Ibrahim and Hatice decide to marry him to Sadika. Nigar begins to prepare Hatice’s chambers for Mahidevran, but Hürrem hears about this and asks the Sultan to give the chambers to her. Beylerbey of Egypt, Ahmed Pasha, proclaims himself sultan and starts a rebellion. Suleiman orders Ibrahim to bring him the head of the rebellious one. Hatice is pregnant. Suleiman asks Hürrem to pose with him for a portrait, but she asks him to abandon this idea. Hürrem asks Leo to leave Istanbul, or she and her children will be in mortal danger.
19	19	"Episode 19"	Taylan Brothers	Meral Okay	May 18, 2011	15.37
Hürrem meets Leo in the Hatice Palace, convinces him to return to his homeland and tells him to forget her. Mahidevran threatens Nigar to inform on Hurrem. Sadika finds a portrait of Hurrem in Leo’s drawings. Ibrahim successfully suppresses the uprising in Egypt. Suleiman is going hunting in Edirne and wants to take Mustafa and Mahidevran with him. Hürrem and Mehmed also want to go. Mahidevran steals an emerald ring from Hurrem, which Suleiman gave as a gift to her. Hürrem and her children return to the capital before the Sultan. Leo burns portraits of Hurrem and plans to return to Crimea. While Ibrahim is having fun in Egypt, the Janissaries rebel, demanding Ibrahim's resignation. They organize a pogrom in Istanbul and prepare to attack the Sultan's palace and Ibrahim's palace. Due to the warlike situation in the capital, Hürrem is forced to go to the Hatice Palace. Matrakchi and Leo also arrive there. To wait out the riot, Valide orders the entire harem to go down to the basement. Valide is very worried about her daughter, since there is no news from her. The Janissaries encircle Ibrahim's palace. Hatice, Leo, Sadika, Matrakchi, Gulfem and Hürrem and their children decide to take refuge in the basement. While going down to the basement, Hatice falls down the stairs.
20	20	"Episode 20"	Taylan Brothers	Meral Okay	May 25, 2011	15.23
Sümbül reports to Valide that Hatice's palace is surrounded, and there is no news from the Sultan, as well as from Hatice. In the basement, it is discovered that Leo is seriously injured, and Hatice loses her child. Upon learning of the Janissaries' rebellion, Suleiman returns to Topkapi and becomes furious. He orders an end to the uprising and satisfies the demands of the Janissaries - he increases their salaries and promises a campaign. The exhausted prisoners of Ibrahim's palace are brought to Topkapi. Valide understands with horror what her daughter had to endure. Hatice is upset and blames herself for what happened. Suleiman executes the instigators of the rebellion. Mustafa tells his mother that Hurrem, during the Janissary rebellion, took care of him. Mahidevran comes to thank his rival, but due to a clash that arose between them, Mahidevran decides to keep Hürrem’s ring. Ibrahim returns to Istanbul. Hürrem promises a reward to the one who finds her ring, and Mahidevran returns it through Nigar. Suleiman thanks Leo for saving his family and asks him to stay in Istanbul. Hurrem sees Leo in the garden and orders Nigar to give him money and a note in which Hürrem asks Leo to forget about their love and leave. Matrakchi, who is in love with Sadika, unwittingly becomes her assistant. Ibrahim is trying to bring his wife back to life. Suleiman spends the night with Sadika in the Hatice Palace.
21	21	"Episode 21"	Taylan Brothers	Meral Okay	June 1, 2011	15.08
Hürrem learns about what happened in the Hatice Palace. Sadika, in tears, asks for forgiveness from her deceased groom for not being able to kill the Sultan. Many complaints come to Istanbul from Semendir about the lawlessness that Ferhat Pasha is committing. Suleiman orders Ibrahim to deal with the complaints, and soon Ferhat Pasha and Beyhan Sultan arrive from Semendir. Ibrahim gets Leo a job in the court workshop. Mahidevran summons Nigar and, in exchange for information about Hurrem, gifts her and promises to make her the main kalfa. New concubines are brought to the harem from Crimea, one of whom, Tatyana, is presented to the Sultan. Leo returns Hurrem her money. Nigar realizes that she is in love with Ibrahim. Suleiman decides to execute Ferhat Pasha. Having learned about the execution of her husband, Beyhan tells Suleiman that she no longer has a brother, there is only a master. Hatice says that she understands her sister, but Beyhan tells her that she will understand her only when her husband is executed. Leo conveys a message through Nigar to Hürrem. Tatiana is being prepared for the halvet. The Sultan is waiting for the promised concubine, but Hurrem comes to him. She asks to kill herself if the Sultan wants to have other concubines.
22	22	"Episode 22"	Taylan Brothers	Meral Okay	June 8, 2011	14.15
Hürrem's antics infuriate Suleiman. Hürrem sets a condition for the Sultan: either the concubines leave, or she leaves. Valide and the entire harem are unhappy with Hürrem's behavior. Mahidevran thinks that she will soon get rid of her rival. Hürrem is preparing to leave. Suleiman understands that Hürrem loves him very much and sends the concubines out of the palace. Matrakçi gives Sadika a necklace. She understands that he is in love, but continues to take advantage of it. During classes, Gülşah shows her disrespect for Mehmed. Hatice tells her mother that she understands Hürrem's jealousy. Valide explains that if Ibrahim has a mistress, he will lose his wife, position and life. Having learned about what happened in Sehzade's class, Hürrem becomes furious and forbids Gülşah to approach Mehmed. As a sign of his love, Suleiman gives Hürrem a brooch in the shape of a tulip - a symbol of belonging to the dynasty. Suleiman meets the son of the Venetian Doge Alviso Gritti. Gülşah plots the murder of Hürrem, of which Gülnihal becomes the victim.
23	23	"Episode 23"	Taylan Brothers	Meral Okay	June 15, 2011	15.59
Hürrem discovers the bloody Gulnihal in her bed and is horrified. Gulşah runs into Hürrem and realizes that she has made a mistake. Gulnihal is on the verge between life and death. Having learned that Gulşah, contrary to her orders, encroached on Hürrem’s life, Mahidevran beats the faithful maid. Valide finds out about what happened and takes the children and Hürrem to her place. Gulşah ends up in the infirmary. In the morning, Suleiman, having learned about what happened at night, orders Ibrahim to begin an investigation. Gulşah tells Nigar about everything. Nigar goes to Mahidevran and threatens to tell everyone who attempted to assassinate Gulnihal. Suleiman and Ibrahim pay a visit to the son of the Venetian Doge, and the Sultan asks him to become an adviser on European affairs. Leo finishes the portrait of the Sultan and Hürrem and asks Ibrahim to let him go home. Hürrem accuses Mahidevran of attempting to assassinate her. Suleiman invites Mahidevran to pull herself together or leave Istanbul. Leo gives Hürrem a farewell note through Nigar, but the note falls into the hands of Ibrahim.
24	24	"Episode 24"	Taylan Brothers	Meral Okay	June 22, 2011	13.33
Ibrahim learns about Hürrem and Leo's shared past and the notes they exchange. He orders Nigar to search Hürrem's room. Nigar finds her portrait drawn by Leo and burns it. Leo is about to run away and arranges a final meeting with Hürrem. Ibrahim finds out about this, intending to destroy Hürrem. Valide advises Mahidevran to get rid of Gülşah. Hürrem has a nightmare and decides not to go to the meeting with Leo. Hürrem loses consciousness from nervous tension, but the doctor reveals she's pregnant again. In the morning, Hürrem gets ready to go to the garden, but instead of meeting with Leo, she goes to Valide. When Hürrem fails to appear, Ibrahim orders Leo to be seized and thrown into prison. Leo trusts him and tells his love story. Alviso and his sister come to visit Hatice and Ibrahim's palace. Monica Gritti is interested in the customs of the Turks and admits that she could not share her man with a harem. Hürrem tells her that she couldn’t do it either. Hatice is outraged by the Venetian woman’s question about Ibrahim’s harem and tells her husband that she will not tolerate betrayal. Sadika learns about the upcoming wedding with Matrakçi and understands that the time has come to take revenge on the Sultan. Following Hürrem, having learned about her pregnancy, Suleiman arrives. Ibrahim brings Leo and Hürrem together at his home and offers one of them death - poisoned Turkish delight. Ibrahim then leaves. Sadika attacks Suleiman with a knife in Ibrahim's garden.

=== Season 2 (2011–2012) ===
Leo saves Hurrem by eating the poisoned Turkish delight and dies. Sadıka is thwarted by Süleyman and later killed by Matrakçı Nasuh, who had become fond of her. Hürrem gives birth to her fourth child and third son, Bayezid. Spanish Princess Isabella Fortuna is kidnapped by Turkish pirates and sold to Süleyman, who decides to use her as a bargaining chip. Isabella unsuccessfully tries to escape several times. Hürrem becomes jealous, and gets help to send Isabella to Vienna, where she returns to her monastery. Hatice gives birth to her and Ibrahim's first child, a boy named Mehmed, but accidentally smothers him while breastfeeding at night; she later becomes pregnant with twins. Süleyman allows Hürrem to become involved in charity work in accordance with the Five Pillars of Islam. When he goes to her room at night, she tells him that she cannot sleep with him because she is a free woman and they are not married. Breaking with Ottoman tradition, Süleyman decides to marry her. Hafsa and others consider the marriage unacceptable. Furious, Mahidevran also requests to spend her life as a free woman; Süleyman refuses. Hürrem, who sent an assassin to kill İbrahim, changes her mind and calls off the attack after seeing Hatice's sadness. İbrahim, however, is shot with a poisoned arrow during the wedding ceremony by an archer sent by Behram Pasha. İbrahim becomes seriously ill, and Nigar, Matrakçı, and Sümbül bring him to a hot spring to heal him. Nigar is ordered to marry Matrakçı Nasuh, and is unhappy because she is in love with İbrahim. On her first night in her new home, İbrahim arrives unexpectedly after he and Matrakçı had a deal. Matrakçı divorces her, and she becomes İbrahim's lover. While the sultan is at war, Hafsa and Mahidevran conspire against Hürrem. They plant a spy, and pretend to let Hürrem lead the harem for a while. Hürrem gives birth to her fifth child, Cihangir. During a rebellion incited by the spy, a slave is accused of stealing gold; the innocent girl immolates herself. The slaves take torches and march towards Hürrem's chambers to burn her, but Daye and the guardians save her. After his return, Süleyman tells his mother that she is incapable of leading the harem. His mother, who had discovered the truth about İbrahim and Nigar, has a stroke and later dies. After her death, Hürrem and Mahidevran become rivals for the leadership of the harem. Nigar (pregnant by İbrahim) tries to leave the palace, but Hürrem kidnaps and hides her. Hatice finally realizes that her husband has been unfaithful; she sits down with him, brings in Nigar, and he admits everything about their relationship. Hürrem plots against Mahidevran, making her appear to be the person who ordered a servant to strangle Gülfem Hatun. She succeeds this time, and Süleyman makes Hürrem the leader of the harem.

No. overall	No. in season	Title	Directed by	Written by	Original release date	Ratings
25	1	"Episode 25"	Taylan Brothers	Meral Okay	September 14, 2011	12.02
Leo eats poisoned Turkish delight and dies in the arms of his beloved Hürrem. After neutralizing Sadika, Suleiman accuses Ibrahim of allowing the killer to get so close to him. Hürrem drives Nigar away, thinking that it was she who betrayed her to Ibrahim. Under torture, Sadika admits that Matrakçı helped her. Ibrahim, having learned that Matrakçı was deceived, decides to punish him anyway by ordering him to kill Sadika himself. Hürrem is tormented by nightmares associated with Ibrahim Pasha. She tells him that someday he will pay for everything he has done. Under the pretext of escaping, Matrakçı takes Sadika to the sea and drowns her there. To cheer up Hürrem, the Sultan gives her a horse, which she calls Aşk (Love). In the hamam, Nigar Kalfa asks for forgiveness from Hürrem and tells her the truth, but Hürrem is adamant and does not want to see the traitor. While walking in the garden, Hürrem began to suspect the sultanas of organizing Sadika's halvet. At the Council of the Divan, Suleiman, angered by the act of King Lajos, announces his intention to go to war against Hungary. The Vatican calls on all of Europe to oppose Suleiman. While the army is preparing to leave the capital, Hürrem gives birth to her third son, Bayazid, in Edirne. Suleiman succumbs to the persuasion of Mahidevran and Valide and takes Mustafa with him to the camp. Mustafa secretly goes into the forest and encounters the so-called horsemen from the Ottoman army - Delhi. Sabit returns Mustafa to the camp. Suleiman sends his son back to his mother. The Sultan sets out on a campaign for the head of King Lajos. Hatice finds out about her pregnancy. In the forest, Suleiman asks Ibrahim about Hürrem and immediately a Hungarian mercenary shoots him with an arquebus.
26	2	"Episode 26"	Taylan Brothers	Meral Okay	September 21, 2011	11.36
Suleiman receives only a slight wound, because at the most dangerous moment Malkoçoglu Bali comes to his aid. Advisors ask the Hungarian king to begin peace negotiations with the Ottomans or flee, but Lajos decides to personally fight Suleiman’s army. Mahidevran is interested in the reason for the quarrel between Hürrem and Nigar. Nigar says that Hürrem considers the attack on Gulnihal and the promotion of Nigar herself to be a strange coincidence. A newly appointed servant to Hürrem, who is a former eunuch from the Edirne palace, Gul Agha, appears in Topkapi. A rivalry begins between him and Sumbul for primacy in the harem. At the request of the sultanas, Gul Agha brings the fortuneteller Yakub Efendi to them. Yakub foretells the birth of a son to Hatice, and Hürrem foretells “black clouds that death will dispel.” Having learned from Hürrem about Hatice's pregnancy, the Sultan shares the good news with Ibrahim. Hürrem has a new maid, Nilüfer. Hürrem invites Hatice to take several maids, but Hatice becomes furious. She says that if Ibrahim takes a lover, she will destroy her husband. Hürrem is shocked by the changes in her relationship with Hatice. On the battlefield of Mohács, Suleiman defeats the Hungarian royal army, and King Lajos himself dies in a swamp during the retreat.
27	3	"Episode 27"	Taylan Brothers	Meral Okay	September 28, 2011	11.44
Suleiman returns to Istanbul, where he is greeted with great joy. In Ottoman waters, Muslim pirates seize the ship of Isabella Fortuna, Princess of Castile and Leon. Despite Alvise Gritti's arguments, the pirates decide to send Isabella to the Sultan. In the harem, Hürrem notices Nigar talking with Mahidevran and becomes convinced that the kalfa is working for two camps. Hürrem, realizing that her hatred for Ibrahim is limitless, asks Yakub Efendi to prepare poison for the Grand Vizier. Valide, worried about her daughter, sends Nigar to help her. Ibrahim buys Isabella from the pirates and takes her to the hunting lodge. Hürrem tells Mihrimah to appreciate her position, since she is a sultana, and not a slave like her mother. Mihrimah tells Hatice about this, but the Sultan’s sister does not care about Hürrem’s pain. Suleiman, eager to meet the Spanish princess, goes to a hunting lodge during a hunt.
28	4	"Episode 28"	Taylan Brothers	Meral Okay	October 5, 2011	11.76
Suleiman visits Isabella and listens to unflattering opinions about himself. At Hürrem's request, Yakub Efendi prepares a poison that cannot be detected. Statues of ancient Greek gods captured as trophies in Hungary are brought to Ibrahim's palace. Hatice is sure that the idols will bring them bad luck. Ibrahim tries to convince her that they are just statues. The people of Istanbul, who learned about the statues, are also outraged and consider Ibrahim an idolater. Valide asks her son to get rid of the statues, but Suleiman asks her not to interfere in Ibrahim’s affairs. Hürrem steals Ibrahim's notebook and gives it to Yakub Efendi, who saturates the notebook with poison. Alvise Gritti informs Prince Ferdinand of Habsburg that his bride Isabella is being held captive by the Sultan. Despite the fact that Isabella gets everything she wants, she tries to escape. Suleiman gives Mahidevran money for charity. Mahidevran notifies the harem, and Hürrem, about the mercy shown to her by the Sultan. While walking around Istanbul with Matrakci, Malkocoglu meets Armin, the daughter of the Jewish merchant Joshua, and falls in love with her. During Hürrem's visit, Hatice goes into labor. Despite the efforts of the midwife, the newborn baby is not breathing.
29	5	"Episode 29"	Taylan Brothers	Meral Okay	October 12, 2011	18.53
Hürrem saves Hatice's newborn son, earning praise from the entire family. Ibrahim also thanks Hürrem, but she reminds him of Leo’s death and says that she will never forget about it. During an unsuccessful escape, Isabella suffers a leg injury. A scandal is brewing between Malkocoglu and Gritti in a tavern over the dancer Elenika. The Austrian ambassadors offer a ransom for Isabella, but Suleiman sends them away. Prince Ferdinand comes to Istanbul with the intention of seeing his bride. Gritti dresses the prince as a servant and sends him to the house where Isabella is being held. Hürrem learns that Ibrahim often visits a beautiful foreign woman in a hunting lodge, and tells Hatice about this. Bali Bey begins to court Armin, but the girl is unapproachable and does not respond to his feelings. Hatice orders Ibrahim to tell her everything about the woman he is visiting. Ibrahim is furious at this treatment, but still tells the truth. The spouses reconcile, but the insult is seared in Ibrahim’s soul. Suleiman sends Ibrahim to Anatolia to suppress the uprising, led by the Mahdi Kalendar Celebi.
30	6	"Episode 30"	Taylan Brothers	Meral Okay	October 20, 2011	17.70
The prince is detained while trying to enter the hunting lodge. Isabella asks Suleiman not to punish her fiancé, but the Sultan is adamant and orders the prince to be thrown into prison. Hatice expresses her grievances against her brother to her mother, but Valide demands that she pull herself together. Mustafa tells his mother about his trip with his father to Isabella. Mahidevran hurries to tell Hürrem everything. Suleiman moves away from Hürrem more and more, and understanding the reason, she decides to meet her rival face to face. Hatice and Ibrahim's son Mehmed falls ill. Hürrem figures out the cause of the disease and tries to protect the child. The relationship between Ibrahim and Hatice becomes tense. Isabella offers Suleiman her body in exchange for the life of her fiancé. Nigar, exhausted by the nagging of Hatice, who has lost her mental balance, is completely confused. In order to suppress the popular movement led by Kalendar Çelebi in Anatolia, Ibrahim Pasha bribed the Turkmen beys and landowners - the sipahis. Arriving at the hunting lodge of her rival, Hürrem finds Suleiman with Isabella.
31	7	"Episode 31"	Taylan Brothers	Meral Okay	October 27, 2011	16.08
The scene she sees confuses Hürrem. Ibrahim cannot forget his wife's insulting words. Humiliated by the Sultan's refusal, Isabella decides to commit suicide and starts a fire. Having learned that his daughter is secretly dating Malkocoglu, the father takes Armin away from Istanbul. Isabella is rescued, and Suleiman orders her to be sent to the Hatice palace. Valide invites his son to take Isabella into the harem, but Suleiman tells his mother that Isabella is a political pawn and has no place in the harem. Mahidevran and Hürrem come to visit Hatice and run into Isabella. After quelling the uprising, Ibrahim establishes peace in Anatolia and returns to Istanbul. Mahidevran tells Hürrem that she can make a mistake at any moment, thereby throwing Suleiman into the arms of Isabella. Suleiman spreads rumors about Isabella's death and releases Prince Ferdinand. Hatice wants to get rid of the statues. Ibrahim is angry and tells his wife that everything in their palace will be the way he wants. Hürrem orders Nigar to keep an eye on Isabella.
32	8	"Episode 32"	Taylan Brothers	Meral Okay	November 2, 2011	16.01
Isabella realizes that she has begun to fall in love with the Sultan. Malkocoglu kidnaps Armin and hides her with Matrakchi. Armin, who was about to run away, realizes that she loves Bali Bey. While walking in the garden with the children, Gul Agha sees a snake, and Hurrem comes up with a plan to get rid of her rival. Hürrem threatens Isabella and tells her to leave. Isabella begins to flirt with Ibrahim, which makes Hatice jealous. Father Armin complains to Ibrahim about Bali Bey, and he tells Malkochoglu to return the girl to her father. Under the pretext of confession, Isabella goes to church, where she conveys the news to her family. Tension arises between Ibrahim and Suleiman over the princess. The same problems await Ibrahim at home. Hürrem understands that the Sultan is losing interest in her. By order of the Sultan, Isabella is transported to a hunting lodge. Hurrem arrives at the hunting lodge and sees on Isabella’s neck the necklace that the Sultan made for her. She understands that it is time to get rid of her rival. Ibrahim becomes ill. The poisoned notebook begins to take effect.
33	9	"Episode 33"	Taylan Brothers	Meral Okay	November 9, 2011	19.61
Hürrem sends Isabella a poisonous gift; the princess is saved by a carrier pigeon, which brings news from her relatives. Suleiman forbids Hurrem to communicate with Isabella. To annoy Hurrem, Valide organizes a party to which Isabella is invited. Armin returns home upset. During Ibrahim's illness, Nigar takes care of him. Seeing this, Hatice sends Nigar back to Topkapi. A man appears in Istanbul explaining the dogmas of the Christian faith. Suleiman orders Ibrahim to summon the philosopher to the council of the Divan. Suleiman admits to Isabella that he loves Hurrem very much. Hurrem is suffering more and more and is about to send the horse donated by the Sultan back, but Suleiman convinces Hurrem that Isabella is just a pawn in his political game. Valide demands that Suleiman move Isabella into a harem. Suleiman advises his mother not to drag the princess into harem intrigues. At Divan's council, Ibrahim loses consciousness. Hürrem and Nigar come to visit him. During Suleiman's visit to the hunting lodge, Isabella is bitten by a snake.
34	10	"Episode 34"	Taylan Brothers	Meral Okay	November 16, 2011	19.50
Suleiman saves Isabella. At the princess's request, he stays with her in the hunting lodge. Hürrem is going to put an end to Ibrahim, but the arrival of Nigar and the doctor ruins her plans. The doctor says that the Grand Vizier was poisoned. Ibrahim is going to hide his diagnosis from everyone and asks to say that he has pneumonia. Valide orders Mustafa to be moved to the former chambers of Hatice, which is claimed by Hurrem. Waking up in the morning, Hatice discovers his dead son in his arms. Mad with grief, she locks herself in her chambers and refuses to give up the child for burial. Isabella learns that her fiancé is preparing an escape for her, but she understands that she does not want to leave the Sultan. Ibrahim blames Hurrem for the death of the child and shows her Leo's diary, with the help of which he plans to destroy her. Hatice admits that she herself caused the baby's death. Isabella goes to church again, accompanied by Malkocoglu. With the help of Nigar, Ibrahim finds out the reason for his poisoning: his notebook is saturated with poison. Ibrahim decides to take revenge and goes to the Sultan with Leo's diary, where he asks Hurrem to translate its contents. Hatice decides to attempt suicide. Polat Bilgin guest stars as Molla Kabiz.
35	11	"Episode 35"	Taylan Brothers	Meral Okay	November 23, 2011	18.44
Hatice opens the veins. Ibrahim forces Hurrem to read Leo's diary to the Sultan, but the news of the incident with Hatice ruins his plans. Regretting that she threw away the diary, Hürrem sends Nilüfer to look for it in the garden. Gulsah is ahead of the servant Hurrem and gives the diary to Mahidevran. Isabella comes to visit Hatice and faces threats from Hurrem. Malkocoglu visits Armin and learns from the doctor that she has the plague. The plague epidemic in the capital is gaining momentum and reaches the palace. Valide decides to leave with his daughter for Edirne. Hürrem organizes an escape for Isabella. Ibrahim instructs Nigar to find Leo's diary. Isabella arranges a scene of jealousy for Suleiman. Ibrahim, smitten by Nigar's charms, makes her his mistress in the absence of his wife, but drives her away in the morning. Isabella goes to the ship, where Ibrahim, who learned about the escape, is already waiting for her.
36	12	"Episode 36"	Taylan Brothers	Meral Okay	November 30, 2011	14.15
Ibrahim understands that Hurrem arranged the princess’s escape. Armin gets worse and she decides to break up with Malkocoglu. Disagreeing with this decision, Malkcoglu marries Armin. Ibrahim reports to the ruler about Isabella's unsuccessful escape. The Sultan goes to the princess and tells her that he does not want to see her anymore. Nigar returns to the harem. Hürrem organizes a celebration to get rid of Isabella. Bali Bey wakes up in the morning with his dead wife. Waking up from his grief, Hatice decides to return to Istanbul. Valide returns to the harem and, seeing Hurrem's holiday, becomes furious. Nigar enters her room and discovers that Gulsah was looking through her things. A quarrel breaks out between them, which turns into a fight. In Istanbul, Hatice is haunted by hallucinations: she hears the cry of her dead son. To get rid of this, Hatice burns her son's cradle and she feels better. She decides to hold a reception in her palace, inviting Isabella. Ibrahim is haunted by memories of the night with Nigar. Valide decides to marry Nigar. Hürrem, having encountered Isabella in the Hatice Palace, demands an explanation from her. Isabella tells her that she will fight for the Sultan's love. Suleiman overhears their conversation and decides to take Isabella into his harem. After persuasion, Daye Valide decides not to expel Nigar.
37	13	"Episode 37"	Taylan Brothers	Meral Okay	December 7, 2011	15.67
Isabella moves into the harem, thereby enraging Hurrem. Hürrem hurries to Suleiman for an explanation, but he advises her not to meddle in his affairs. In Semendir, Malkocoglu understands that he doesn’t need anyone except Armin. Valide calls Hürrem to her, and at this time Isabella goes to the sultan. Hürrem understands that getting rid of her rival will not be so easy. On Hürrem's orders, Nilüfer arranges an accident during a horseback ride. By order of Ibrahim, Nigar offers Hurrem to get rid of Isabella, taking advantage of the situation in the capital. Hürrem agrees, but the distrust of the Kalfa overpowers her, and she assigns Gul-aga and Nilüfer to Nigar. Ibrahim gives Nigar a capsule with poison so that Hurrem will be blamed for Isabella’s death. Hurrem goes to Isabella and advises her to leave the harem on her own, but the princess drives the Sultana away and tells Suleiman about everything. In the midst of executing the plan, Gul Agha realizes that Nigar has betrayed them and poisoned the princess’s food. He tells Hurrem about this, and she hurries to Isabella’s chambers, where she discovers the dead Carmina. Hürrem attacks Nigar, but she makes excuses. They lock the dead maid and princess in the laundry room.
38	14	"Episode 38"	Taylan Brothers	Meral Okay	December 14, 2011	17.74
Hurrem orders Gül Agha and Nigar to get rid of Isabella and her dead maid. Hurrem tells Isabella that she has won again. Gul-aga and Nigar discuss how best to carry out Hürrem’s order. Gulsah hears their conversation. The entire harem is looking for the princess, but not a trace remains of her. Mahidevran, having learned about the conversation between Hurrem’s servants, goes to the laundry, but Isabella is not there either. Suleiman promises to punish those responsible. Valide overhears Hurrem and Mihrimah talking about how Hurrem will be able to get rid of Ibrahim, Valide, Mahidevran and Mustafa the same way she got rid of Isabella. Bali Bey asks Suleiman to allow him to return home, but the Sultan refuses and appoints him keeper of the chambers, which displeases Ibrahim. Valide tells his son about the conversation between Hurrem and Mihrimah. Suleiman promises to punish Hurrem and advises Valide, in order to avoid similar situations in the future, to better manage the harem. Hatice asks Gul Aga to bring her a fortuneteller. Yakub Efendi, on the orders of Hürrem, predicts Hatice the imminent death of a person close to her. Suleiman calls Hürrem to him, but contrary to the expectations of the harem, he forgives her again. Valide decides to punish Hürrem herself and deprives her of her devoted servants. Having taken Hürrem’s knife from Nilüfer, Valide makes a plan to get rid of the hated Sultana. Suleiman tells Ibrahim that Isabella went to the monastery to atone for her sins. Nilüfer tells Hürrem that they want to kill her, but they kill her horse. Upset by the murder of her beloved horse, Hürrem goes to Valide with a bloody knife in her hands.
39	15	"Episode 39"	Taylan Brothers	Meral Okay	December 21, 2011	—
Hürrem demands justice for her horse. Suleiman appoints Ibrahim commander-in-chief of the Ottoman army. Hürrem tells Suleiman about what happened: the Sultan orders Malkocoglu to begin an investigation. Malkochoglu quickly finds the culprit: the killer turns out to be Nilüfer. Hürrem defends her, believing that one of the sultanas is to blame for everything. Hatice tells her husband about Yakub Effendi's prediction. Enraged, Ibrahim goes to the soothsayer and kills him, but before his death, Yakub predicts Ibrahim's imminent death. Under pressure from Malkocoglu, Nilüfer confesses to the murder, but claims that Daye threatened her with death. Bali Bey gets to the bottom of the truth, but Valide orders him not to tell the Sultan anything. During the preparations for Nigar, who is planning to move to Hatice at the request of the Sultana, Gulsah finds Leo's diary and gives it to Mahidevran. Hürrem finds out that Nilufer confessed everything, but still believes that the maid was framed.Hürrem goes to prison to save Nilüfer, but comes too late: Nilüfer was strangled on the orders of Valide. Suleiman goes on a campaign against Hungary, where he successfully wins back the Hungarian crown and crowns a new Hungarian ruler. Malkocoglu's rapprochement with the Sultan angers Ibrahim. Mahidevran gives Leo's diary to Valide and she, having read it, calls Hurrem to her and demands to immediately leave the palace.
40	16	"Episode 40"	Taylan Brothers	Meral Okay	December 28, 2011	12.73
Valide tells Hurrem that she knows about her betrayal, and that if she does not leave, not only she, but also her children will be executed. Hürrem tells Valide the truth. Valide loses consciousness, and everyone immediately begins to blame Hurrem for this. Hürrem blames Nigar for everything and orders the servants to steal the diary from Valide. Nigar advises her to resolve this issue with Daye. Daye listens to Hürrem, but does not answer her. She asks Nigar if there was betrayal, but the kalfa replies that Hürrem loves the Sultan too much. Valide comes to her senses and demands that Hurrem be expelled from the harem, but Daye gives Hurrem Leo's diary. Hurrem burns the diary in front of Valide. Suleiman returns to the capital. Hurrem complains to the Sultan that she cannot do charity work, and Suleiman decides to give her freedom. Valide is outraged by her son’s action, while Mahidevran is furious at the rise of her rival. Nigar admits to Ibrahim that she cannot forget the night she spent with him, but Ibrahim does not care about her feelings. Nigar decides to commit suicide and leaves a farewell letter. The letter is found by Hatice. Suleiman invites Hurrem to the halvet, but she refuses and says that, as a devout Muslim, she cannot share a bed with a man who is not her husband.
41	17	"Episode 41"	Taylan Brothers	Meral Okay	January 4, 2012	15.62
Suleiman is angry with Hurrem and sends her to the hunting lodge. Nigar is about to jump from the balcony of the Hatice Palace, but Ibrahim stops her. Hurrem begs Suleiman not to separate her from her sons, but he is adamant. Suleiman invites Mahidevran to come to his place, but she spends the night alone. Hurrem and Mihrimah leave the palace, the sons remain with their father. Hatice gives Nigar's letter to her husband, not daring to read it. The news of Hatice's pregnancy reaches Topkapi. Mahidevran advises Hatice to marry Nigar. Suleiman goes to the hunting lodge to visit his sick daughter and stays there overnight. Valide decides to strike. She enters into a conspiracy with Ibrahim. Together they set a trap for Hurrem, who, at the invitation of Valide, goes to the palace to meet with the children, but along the way mercenaries are waiting for her, intending to kill her. Sultan Suleiman learns about the attack on Hurrem and goes to her aid. Malkocoglu fights off the carriage, but Hürrem is not in it. Frightened, Hürrem runs into the forest, falls off a cliff and loses consciousness.
42	18	"Episode 42"	Taylan Brothers	Meral Okay	January 11, 2012	12.41
Ibrahim interrogates the robber and learns that Hurrem is most likely alive. Suleiman, also confident that his beloved concubine is alive, continues to search for Hurrem. Ibrahim orders to get rid of the robber before he starts talking. Suleiman finds Hurrem unconscious in the forest and brings her to the palace. Mahidevran, Hatice and Valide are in dismay: despite their efforts, Hürrem managed to survive again and return to the harem even stronger. Valide orders Ibrahim to cover his tracks so that the investigation does not lead to her. Hurrem orders Gul Agha to gather strong and loyal servants on her side, since the Sultana is sure that the war is just beginning. During interrogation, Ibrahim kills the leader of the robbers. The Sultan informs Ibrahim that Hurrem will not leave the harem from now on. Hürrem orders the hiring of a killer for Ibrahim. During the celebration of the circumcision ceremony of Shehzade Mustafa and Shehzade Mehmed, Valide is again convinced of her son’s love for Hurrem: Suleiman sends away the concubine that his mother sent him. Realizing that Hatice cannot live without Ibrahim, Hurrem orders the killer to be recalled. Suleiman takes Hürrem to the window of the room in which the nikah ceremony of Suleiman and Hürrem takes place.
43	19	"Episode 43"	Taylan Brothers	Meral Okay	January 18, 2012	12.76
During the celebration of the circumcision of Sehzade Mustafa and Sehzade Mehmed, an arrow wounds Ibrahim. The wound does not seem serious to the Grand Vizier, and he forbids reporting the incident to the Sultan. Suleiman announces to everyone about his marriage with Hürrem. Valide, like Mahidevran and Hatice, is unhappy with this turn of events. Gulfem, on the contrary, congratulates the spouses. The servants are preparing to celebrate the event in the harem, but Valide forbids this. At night, Ibrahim becomes ill due to an inflamed wound. The archer who wounded Ibrahim is put in prison, but is killed there. Ibrahim goes to Nigar and there he finds out that the arrow was poisoned. Doctors say that Ibrahim’s life is counted by the clock. Ibrahim gets worse, and Matrakchi decides to take him to a cave with healing springs. Hürrem comes to support Hatice, but she drives her away. Nigar follows Ibrahim into the cave. Hürrem orders herself a crown larger and more luxurious than Valide’s. Rumors about Hurrem's actions reach Valide, and she decides to tell her son about his wife's betrayal. Suleiman does not believe it, but Valide promises that Hurrem will confess everything herself. While the Sultan is hiding behind the partition, Valide calls Hurrem to his place and asks her who she plans to overthrow next.
44	20	"Episode 44"	Taylan Brothers	Meral Okay	January 25, 2012	11.85
Valide starts a conversation with Hurrem about Leo. Hürrem sees the reflection of the Sultan in a jug on the table and resolutely denies everything that Valide accuses her of. In the cave, Ibrahim is looked after by Nigar, who is unable to hide her feelings. Sumbul notices this and scolds Nigar. She swears that Ibrahim knows nothing. Hatice worries about her husband, and only after talking with Hürrem does she come to her senses. A war for the throne is flaring up in Crimea. Valide asks her brother Girey Khan to bring his daughter Aybige to the palace. Ibrahim comes to his senses. The doctor says that a miracle happened and Ibrahim’s wound has almost healed. Ibrahim orders him to be taken home. Hatice rejoices at her husband’s quick recovery. Syumbul tells Daya about what he saw in the cave. Daye asks him not to talk about this topic and scolds Nigar. Valide, as a reward for good service, promises Nigar a luxurious wedding with Matrakchi. Nigar is forced to agree. During the wedding celebration, Aybige meets Hürrem and immediately takes a liking to her. While walking through the market, one of the traders tries to poison Ibrahim. In Elenika's tavern, Gul-aga quarrels with Matrakchi. At Nigar's farewell to her husband's house, Hürrem appears wearing a large, beautiful and expensive crown. Valide becomes furious and orders Hurrem to leave. Hurrem at Valide’s feet asks for friendship, but she refuses her and leaves. Hatice goes into labor. Matrakchi divorces Nigar. Nigar asks him to explain the reason and soon she sees Ibrahim at her feet. The Sultan summons Valide, Mahidevran and Gulfem and asks them to treat Hurrem with respect.
45	21	"Episode 45"	Taylan Brothers	Meral Okay	February 1, 2012	12.32
Ibrahim tells Nigar that they are together now. Hatice gives birth to twins - a daughter, Huricihan, and a son, Osman. Ibrahim learns about the addition to the family only in the morning, after the night with Nigar. Mahidevran does not want to show Hürrem respect and demands the Sultan to grant her freedom. Suleiman orders Mahidevran to be expelled from the palace. Ibrahim stands up for her. Aybige and Bali Bey are spending more and more time together. Aybige annoys Bali Bey, but Hürrem suspects that a nascent feeling is hiding behind this. In Elenika's bed, Behram confesses to her the attempt on Ibrahim's life. Elenika asks Gul Agha to report everything to Bali Bey, but Gul Agha reports this to Hurrem. Mustafa again finds his mother in tears and asks his father for permission to leave Mahidevran for Edirne. Ibrahim gives Nigar a house. Behram is watching him and already knows that the Grand Vizier has a mistress. To remove all suspicion from himself, Hurrem tells Ibrahim about who attempted to assassinate him. Ibrahim comes to Behram, but he threatens to tell about Ibrahim’s betrayal and demands that he be reinstated as governor of Anatolia. Valide invites Hurrem to dinner and tells her that he wants peace. Ibrahim attempts to poison Behram, but he escapes and asks for an audience with the Sultan.
46	22	"Episode 46"	Taylan Brothers	Meral Okay	February 8, 2012	13.47
Valide's favor does not please Hürrem. She is sure that Valide is weaving a new intrigue against her. Under pressure from Behram, Ibrahim is forced to return his post to him. The Sultan is surprised, but Ibrahim says that with such a position it is still possible to keep an eye on Behram. Valide begins the game against Hürrem and reduces the salary increase for the harem concubines who took the side of Hürrem. The Sultan's wife tries to figure it out, but only makes the situation worse. The harem is divided into two camps: supporters of Hurrem and the other concubines. They start quarrels and fights. Valide doesn't interfere, happy to let the chaos ensue. Ibrahim demands from Behram papers for Nigar's house, which can confirm the fact of Ibrahim's adultery. Behram refuses. Ibrahim orders the killing of Behram, his guards and all witnesses to the murder. Three years have passed. Hurrem and Suleiman have a fourth son, Cihangir. The matured Mustafa and Mahidevran return to Topkapi. The atmosphere of the harem continues to approach boiling point. Bali Bey falls in love with Aybige, but still cannot forget his wife. After the ceremony of presenting the sword to Mustafa, Valide orders Mahidevran to select girls for Mustafa's harem. None of Hurrem's supporters should get there. Ibrahim continues to meet with Nigar. The Grand Vizier understands that Nigar is his destiny. Elif is sent to the halvet to Mustafa. Hürrem understands that she needs to get rid of Mahidevran's influence on Mustafa. To do this, it is necessary to introduce one of Hurrem’s confidantes into Sehzade’s harem.
47	23	"Episode 47"	Taylan Brothers	Meral Okay	February 15, 2012	16.41
Hürrem is sure that as soon as Suleiman goes on a campaign, Valide will take the opportunity to harm her. During the campaign, Hatice and Nigar moved to Topkapi. Valide bribes one of Hurrem's maids. During the campaign, the French ambassadors offer Suleiman an alliance against Austria. Lalezar Hatun makes unflattering remarks about Hurrem, and the Sultana promises to cut out her tongue. At night, Lalezar’s tongue is actually cut out and Hurrem is blamed for what happened. Mustafa is wounded during the battle and asks not to tell his father anything. By order of Valide, Fatma Hatun steals money from the concubines and plants it on Mustafa's favorite Elif. When the guards come for Elif to drive her out of the palace, the girl burns herself alive. Fatma pushes the concubines to revolt. Valide orders to neutralize all the servants of Hurrem. Aybige hears about Valide’s plans and tells Daye about everything. She, along with the guards, rush to help Hurrem, but come too late: the concubines burst into Hurrem’s chambers and burn her face.
48	24	"Episode 48"	Taylan Brothers	Meral Okay	February 22, 2012	16.33
After the assassination attempt, Hürrem writes a letter to Suleiman, in which she talks about what happened. Her letter is intercepted by Ibrahim. Hürrem returns to Topkapi from Hatice Palace. She shows Valide her face and tells her that Daye sent the second letter to the overlord. Valide removes Daye from the post of Treasurer and appoints Gulsah in her place. Suleiman returns to the palace and demands an explanation from Valide, but Valide claims that Hurrem herself is to blame. Ibrahim arranges a dinner in his palace and invites Valide, the Sultan and Hurrem, but peace cannot be restored. Nora attracts Mustafa's attention, and the heir invites the girl to the halvet. Ibrahim, leaving his wife alone, spends the night with Nigar. Aybige is overcome by jealousy towards Elenika. Malkocoglu tells Matrakci that he has fallen in love. All the inhabitants of the harem are outraged by Gulsah's behavior: she takes cruel measures against them. Gulsah pushes Nigar, and in response Daye slaps Gulsah, who tells Valida everything. Valide kicks Daye out of the harem, but Hurrem orders Daye to stay. Mahidevran, in a conversation with Hurrem, tries to hit her, but her attempt is stopped by Suleiman and orders her to apologize to Hurrem. Mahidevran complains to Mustafa, and the heir goes to his father to sort it out.
49	25	"Episode 49"	Taylan Brothers	Meral Okay	February 29, 2012	12.94
Suleiman is angry with Mustafa. After a conversation with him, the Sultan admits to Ibrahim that he could have forgotten that this is his son. Mustafa falls in love with Nora and spends the night with her. On the advice of Hurrem, Nora asks Mustafa to convert her to Islam. Mustafa gives her a new name - Efsun. Mahidevran is concerned about her son’s hobby. She tells Efsun about the rules of the harem and that Mustafa cannot have children before leaving for the sanjak. Efsun reports everything to Hürrem. Matrakchi admits to his wife that he cannot live like this any longer. He finds horns on his door, which means that Nigar is cheating on him, rumors begin to circulate in the city. Nigar asks him for forgiveness, but admits that she cannot break up with Ibrahim because of her love. Suleiman gives Aybige permission to return to Crimea and orders Bali Bey to accompany her. Aybige understands that her feelings for Bali Bey are mutual. Despite the entreaties of his mother and Valide, Mustafa refuses to go to Friday prayer. Ibrahim manages to persuade him. Suleiman returns Daye to her previous position. Valide is outraged by her son’s decision. Nigar tells Hatice that she is infertile and that is why Matrakci wants a divorce. By order of Valide, Fidan and Fatma return to the palace. In Topkapi, Mahidevran recruits Fatma, and Fidan is appointed kalfa. Hurrem becomes furious at this news and demands an explanation from Valide. Valide replies that they have already been punished. Mahidevran and Valide decide to marry Mustafa and Aybige.
50	26	"Episode 50"	Taylan Brothers	Meral Okay	March 7, 2012	11.90
Valide announces the wedding of Aybige and Mustafa. The Sultan is pleased with his mother's decision. The sculptor who arrived to restore the statues; Ibrahim orders his own bust. Hatice is outraged by her husband's behavior, but he tells her not to interfere. Aybige tells Hurrem that she does not want to marry Mustafa. Hürrem persuades her to fight for her love, invites her to run away with Bali Bey and promises her his help. Matrakchi and Nigar are officially divorced. Everyone in the harem sympathizes with Nigar and tries to help her. Mahidevran sends Efsun to the old palace and sends Fatma to her son, but Mustafa is dissatisfied with this state of affairs and orders Efsun to be returned. Hürrem gets revenge by having Fatma and Fidan's faces burned. Having learned that Malkocoglu again went to Elenika’s tavern, Aybige gives Valide’s consent to marry Mustafa. Daye goes to visit Nigar and there he realizes that Nigar has a lover. Daye expresses his concerns to Nigar, at which time Hürrem hears them. Hurrem tells her husband about Ibrahim's affairs. Daye recognizes the man who came to Nigar as Ibrahim.
51	27	"Episode 51"	Taylan Brothers	Meral Okay	March 14, 2012	13.62
Suleiman understands that the authorities have changed Ibrahim a lot, but he reminds his friend that he didn’t ask for anything. To get out of the awkward situation, Daye tells Hürrem that Nigar tried to kill herself because of the divorce. Ibrahim leaves home. Hürrem tells Aybige that Malkocoglu has not been to Elenika for a long time. Aybige realizes that she made a mistake. Aybige goes to Bali Bey to explain herself, but he assures her that he has no feelings for her. Suleiman sends the severed head of the bust to Ibrahim's palace. The next morning, Hatice, who discovered the head, becomes hysterical: she is sure that her brother executed her husband. Hatice goes to Topkapi and starts a scandal there. Nigar, hearing about Ibrahim's execution, loses consciousness. It soon becomes clear that Ibrahim has left the hunting lodge. Efendi Hazretleri appears in Istanbul, who dreams of overthrowing Ibrahim. Ibrahim complains to his brother about the attitude of the Sultan’s family and Hatice in particular towards him. Mihrimah accidentally breaks her mother's crown and blames the maid for it. Ibrahim tells Niko that he loves someone else and dreams of returning to Parga with her. Suleiman threatens to execute Ibrahim if he does not appear at Mustafa's engagement party. Mustafa, at Hatice's request, persuades the Grand Vizier to return. Aybige's father, Sahib Girey Khan, arrives in the capital. Mustafa and Efsun realize that they love each other. Matrakchi guesses that Bali Bey loves Aybige, and their feelings are mutual. Hürrem decides to take advantage of the situation. Ibrahim appears at the palace and is immediately caught by guards.
52	28	"Episode 52"	Taylan Brothers	Meral Okay	March 21, 2012	12.73
Ibrahim is thrown into prison. Hürrem informs Hatice about what happened. Suleiman accuses Ibrahim, but still decides to save his life and position. Daye, in order to protect Nigar, advises her to stay and live in the palace. Bali Bey has another fan - Mihrimah, who considers Aybige a rival in the fight for Malkocoglu's heart. Mihrimah says in front of everyone that Aibige is in love with Bali Bey, but no one takes her words seriously. Returning to service, Ibrahim cancels Ayas Pasha's order to subsidize the Sufi tekke movement, which is supported by Efendi Hazretleri. From Fatma, who overheard the conversation between Gul Aga and Efsun, Mahidevran learns that Efsun still serves Hurrem. She beats Efsun and attacks Hurrem with accusations, but she fails to convince her son that his favorite betrayed him. Hatice begins to suspect that her husband has a mistress. People from the tekke riot at Ibrahim's palace demanding the return of subsidies to them. News of the conflict between the mothers of the heirs reaches the overlord. Suleiman demands that Hurrem apologize to Mustafa.
53	29	"Episode 53"	Taylan Brothers	Meral Okay	March 28, 2012	15.46
Hürrem is forced to apologize to Mustafa. She is outraged and asks her husband who he takes her for, so that she apologizes to Sehzade. Mahidevran gives the order to Fatma and Gulsah to kill Efsun, and Mustafa’s favorite has no choice but to promise Mahidevran to spy on Hurrem and tell about her secrets. Efendi Khazretleri orders the tekke to turn the people against Ibrahim. Efsun warns Hurrem about Mahidevran's threats. Hurrem promises to find a way out and finds it: she gives her the order to inform Mahidevran about Hurrem’s plans regarding Aybige and Bali Bey. Daye wants to marry Nigar and instructs Sumbul to find a groom for her. Nigar turns to Ibrahim, but he advises her to find a way out herself. Mahidevran takes Efsun's story at face value. Hatice is trying to restore relations with her husband, but Ibrahim does not want to put up with her. Mahidevran tells the entire harem that Hurrem apologized to Mustafa. While walking with Aybige, Hürrem tells Mustafa not to be a pawn in his mother's hands. The renewed friendship between Valide and Daye begins to infuriate Gülşah. Mahidevran forbids Aybige to communicate with Hürrem and Bali Bey. Hürrem advises Mahidevran to better protect Mustafa from herself. Hurrem gives Efsun a bottle of poison to poison Mustafa. Matrakci reprimands Ibrahim, the Grand Vizier drives his friend away. Matrakci accept dervishes into their ranks. Suleiman, as a sign of reconciliation, presents Hürrem with jewelry; however, Hürrem rejects the gift. In response, the Sultan gives this decoration to Mahidevran. Nigar, pretending to be sick, with the help of Gul Aga, forces the new groom to abandon her. While Mustafa and Efsun are talking at dinner, she secretly adds poison to his soup. Cihangir falls ill. The doctor says that the baby has problems with the spine and will have a hump.
54	30	"Episode 54"	Taylan Brothers	Meral Okay	April 4, 2012	13.40
Mustafa manages to eat a spoonful of the poisoned soup when Efsun overturns the table. Mustafa begins to develop a fever, and Efsun raises the entire harem to its feet. Doctors save Sehzade. The chief doctor tells the Sultan that in order to relieve Cihangir’s pain, he will have to undergo a dangerous procedure to stretch the spine, during which the baby could die. The fortune teller tells Hürrem that Cihangir is paying for the sins of others with his illness. The Sultan lets Aybige go to Crimea to stay. Hürrem advises Aybige to run away with Bali Bey, and Mustafa tells Malkocoglu that he is going to break off the engagement. Nigar goes home to meet with Ibrahim. He stays with her overnight, and his and Nigar’s love grows stronger. It turns out that Matrakci deliberately introduced dervishes into the tekke so that Ibrahim could know about every step of Efendi Hazretleri, however, he is in no hurry to open up. The dangerous procedure is successful. At this time, the Sultan is supported by Ibrahim and Mustafa. Efsun admits to Hurrem that she loves Mustafa and cannot kill him. Hürrem spreads rumors around the palace about the escape of Aybige and Bali Bey. Hatice reproaches her husband for not spending the night at home. Ibrahim invites her to go to Beykoz with the whole family. Mustafa learns from Sumbul that Efsun is pregnant. While sailing on the ship, Aybige and Bali Bey confess their feelings to each other. Mahidevran tells Suleiman about the escape of Aybige and Bali Bey. The Sultan gives the order to return the ship to Istanbul. Ibrahim's carriage is attacked by robbers. In the morning, Cihangir stops breathing. Suleiman loses consciousness from the emotions he has experienced.
55	31	"Episode 55"	Taylan Brothers	Meral Okay	April 11, 2012	14.25
Cihangir is brought to his senses. The doctor says that Suleiman is between life and death. On the way to Beykoz, Ibrahim's carriage is attacked by robbers and Hatice's life is threatened. Ibrahim saves his wife. Suleiman sees his father in his visions. Mahidevran remembers the young Suleiman and the birth of Mustafa. Having learned about the illness of the ruler, Hürrem puts on mourning clothes. Life without Suleiman seems meaningless to her. During a trip to Crimea, Aibyige wants to surrender to Bali Bey. Ibrahim saves the exposed Matrakchi. Mahidevran is preparing for the death of Suleiman, wanting to elevate Mustafa to the throne. Hurrem asks Gul Aga to bring her poison. Valide hears about Mahidevran's plans. Aybige and Bali Bey are returned to the palace. By order of Valide, Hurrem's children are sent to the palace of Hatice and Ibrahim. Aybige and Bali Bey try to prove their innocence, but Mahidevran beats Aybige and tells Mustafa that Efsun told the truth about Aybige. Mustafa is disappointed: his beloved concubine also takes part in the intrigues. Mahidevran tells Hurrem at Suleiman's bedside that she will soon see the death of her children. Hurrem swears that Suleiman will live. Unexpectedly, the entire harem takes Hurrem’s side. Suleiman comes to his senses.
56	32	"Episode 56"	Taylan Brothers	Meral Okay	April 18, 2012	15.14
Suleiman's attitude towards Mahidevran changed. She blames Hurrem for this, but Valide puts Mahidevran in her place. Bali Bey tells the ruler that he is guilty only of love for Aybige. Gülşah tells Aybige that Efsun reported her escape at the instigation ofHürrem. Aybige demands an explanation from her friend, but Hürrem tells her that everything is going according to plan. Suleiman gives Malkochoglu into the hands of his son. Mahidevran advises Mustafa to execute Bali Bey, but he decides to pardon him. Bali Bey returns to his homeland, the engagement of Aybige and Mustafa is terminated, and Aybige herself leaves for Crimea. Valide once again declares Daye as her personal maid. Dissatisfied with this state of affairs, Gulsah steals from Daye the deed that Hürrem gave Daye for a ranch, but Nigar replaces the documents and Gülşah is scolded by Valide for slandering Daye. Hürrem tells Suleiman that while he was unconscious, she was thinking about her death. Suleiman takes the poison from his wife. Nigar tells Ibrahim that they cannot have their own family. Ibrahim asks Nigar to give birth to a girl. Hatice establishes surveillance of her husband, but Idris Agha sees Ibrahim only in the tavern, talking with Matrakchi and Elenika. After threatening Hatice, Ibrahim decides to break up with Nigar. Mahidevran finds out about Efsun's pregnancy; she insists on an abortion, but Mustafa asks her mother not to do this. He wants to send Efsun to Manisa before Mustafa arrives, but Hürrem tells Valide everything, and Efsun is given an abortion. Mustafa finds out about this too late: Efsun is bleeding heavily. She tells Mustafa about Hurrem's plans and dies in Sehzade's arms.
57	33	"Episode 57"	Taylan Brothers	Yılmaz Şahin	April 25, 2012	14.18
Makidevran and Mustafa tell the ruler about everything, but the Sultan does not believe them. Suleiman decides to test his beloved: he invites Hurrem to drink poison to prove his love. Hurrem drinks everything to the dregs. Soon Hurrem wakes up, and Suleiman says that there was a sleeping pill in the bottle. Ibrahim explains to Mustafa that Hurrem is invincible, and he told his father everything in vain. Gulfem tells Valide about Hatice's suspicions. For negligence, Daye deprives midwife Arif, who performed Efsun's abortion, from working in the harem. Valide orders Idris Aga, hired by Hatice to keep an eye on her husband, to be brought to her. Gülşah pushes Arife to kill Daye. Ibrahim sets up a throne in his palace for meetings with Austrian ambassadors. Daye persuades Nigar to leave Ibrahim before Valide finds out about everything. Arife, at the behest of Gülşah, sneaks into the hammam at night to kill Daye. Daye finds out about Nigar's pregnancy. Arif eavesdrops on their conversation and begins to blackmail Daye, but Daye pushes Arife away from her, and the midwife hits her head and dies. Valide decides to retire Daye. In the evening, Daye's carriage is attacked by robbers. She is robbed and beaten. Gülşah wants her own person to take Daye’s place. Mahidevran proposes Gulsah for this position, but Valide appoints Nigar. Mahidevran and Mustafa decide to hit Hurrem where it hurts most - her children. Mustafa takes Hurrem's children hunting. Ibrahim realizes that he loves Hatice and breaks up with Nigar. Idris Agha informs Valide that Nigar is Ibrahim’s mistress.
58	34	"Episode 58"	Taylan Brothers	Yılmaz Şahin	May 2, 2012	14.17
Valide finds out that Nigar is pregnant from Ibrahim. Hurrem is afraid that Mustafa will separate her from her children at any moment. She hurries to the hunting lodge, but Mustafa did not even lay a finger on them. Mustafa tells Hurrem that this incident will serve as a lesson for her. It turns out that Daye's robbery was organized by Gülşah. Fatma tells Mahidevran about this, and, despite Gulsah’s pleas, Mahidevran kicks out the faithful maid. Hatice tells Valide about the new harmony in her marriage with Ibrahim. Valide decides to tell her son everything, but does not have time: she has a stroke, which leaves her bedridden for a long time. Nigar is sent home. Daye advises her to leave Istanbul, but Ibrahim orders Nigar to remain in the position of haznedar, since he is sure that Valide will soon die. Hürrem learns that Ibrahim has a secret that could destroy him. Ibrahim, in order to cover his tracks, orders the death of Idris Agha. The chief treasurer, Iskender Çelebi, arrives in Istanbul. He and Ibrahim begin to have disagreements. Hurrem, having learned about this, lures Iskender to her side. Mahidevran understands that during Valide’s illness, the responsibilities of managing the harem will pass to her. Suleiman is sad - Valide does not come to her senses. He remembers all those events when Valide defended his life. Daye wants to see Valide, but Mahidevran drives her away. Suleiman decides to return the former haznedar. The beaten Daye knocks on the house of the sobbing Nigar. Valide opens her eyes.
59	35	"Episode 59"	Taylan Brothers	Yılmaz Şahin	May 9, 2012	13.57
Valide is paralyzed and unable to speak. Suleiman transfers control of the harem for the duration of her illness to Mahidevran. Iskender gives the ruler the protocol of Ibrahim’s negotiations with the Austrian ambassadors, in which the Grand Vizier puts himself on the same level as Suleiman. Hurrem understands that Iskender is on her side. She gives him the task of convincing the Sultan to send Mahidevran and Mustafa to Manisa as soon as possible. Mustafa warns his mother to stay away from Hurrem, but Mahidevran’s thirst for revenge blinds her. She sends all of Hurrem’s faithful maids to the old palace, and Gul Agha demands execution, but Hatice intervenes in the matter. She puts the arrogant Mahidevran in her place and returns all the maids and Gul Aga to Hurrem. Mahidevran demands that Gul Aga and Nigar swear allegiance to her. Gul Aga takes the side of Hurrem, and Nigar takes the side of Mahidevran. To make a career in the harem, Fatma frames and beats Gulsah in order to alienate her from Mahidevran. She makes attempts to seduce Mustafa. Gulsah understands that Mahidevran no longer needs her and asks Hurrem to take her in as her servant. Hurrem drives her away, not understanding how the former maid of her rival can be useful. By order of Hurrem, Gul Aga tells Mahidevran about Hurrem’s collaboration with one of the Sultan’s close associates. Mahidevran, due to inept management of the harem, squandered the entire annual budget. Nigar admits to Ibrahim that she is expecting a child from him. Gulsah overhears their conversation.
60	36	"Episode 60"	Taylan Brothers	Yılmaz Şahin	May 16, 2012	15.40
Ibrahim and Nigar realize that they were overheard during their conversation. Hürrem learns that Mustafa will go to Manisa alone, and his mother will remain in charge of the harem until Valide recovers. She understands that only Ibrahim could have pushed the Sultan to such a decision. Hürrem orders Iskender to find Efendi Hazretleri and join their efforts against Ibrahim. Fatma tries with all her might to win Mustafa’s heart, but Mahidevran sends another to Mustafa. Fatma pushes her rival down the stairs, and she ends up in the infirmary. However, Mustafa does not accept either of them - he cannot forget the deceased Efsun. Nigar finds the one who overheard his conversation with Ibrahim. Gulsah is sent to the old palace, but even there she brings news to Hurrem. Nigar tells Ibrahim everything. Iskender points Ibrahim to his place. Ibrahim beats him and removes him from his post. By order of Ibrahim, Gulsah is beaten and thrown into a ditch. Suleiman orders Ibrahim to make peace with Iskender. With the help of Gul Aga, Hurrem manages to arrange an assassination attempt on Valide and blame it on Mahidevran. Hatice orders her to leave the palace, but Nigar tells the truth. By order of Mahidevran, Gul Aga was expelled from the palace. Ibrahim tells Mahidevran that Nigar must leave the palace too. Hurrem receives an invitation to a meeting with an unknown woman, who turns out to be the beaten Gulsah.
61	37	"Episode 61"	Taylan Brothers	Yılmaz Şahin	May 23, 2012	15.20
Gulsah, who miraculously survived, tells Hurrem about Nigar and Ibrahim. She asks Hurrem to help and take her into service. Hurrem agrees, but it is dangerous for Gulsah to return to the harem until everything is decided. Sumbul and Seker see Nigar in the market. She lies to them that she has a pregnant neighbor, and Nigar needs to buy a crib for the unborn baby. Sumbul tells Hurrem everything. Mahidevran decides to take revenge on Hurrem and sends a Russian slave to the ruler, but the Sultan sends her away. Despite Ibrahim's protests, Suleiman appoints Iskender as his assistant. Valide is getting better. Fatma gets her way - she spends the night with Mustafa. Sehzade promises her that he will take her with him to Manisa. Suleiman tells Yahya Efendi about the dream in which the Sultan saw Valide. Both understand that Valide will soon die. Mahidevran tells Fatma to stay in the palace. Suleiman appoints Gulfem as the harem treasurer. She immediately gets down to business and accuses Mahidevran of wasting the harem’s funds. Mahidevran asks Iskender for help; he refuses, but offers a way out - to borrow from a Jewish woman, Rakel Hatun, and Mahidevran agrees. Efendi Hazretleri gives the order to the poet Figani to turn the people against Ibrahim, but the Grand Vizier puts the poet in prison. By order of Hurrem, Nigar is kidnapped. After Hurrem's story about Nigar and Ibrahim, Valide gets worse and she dies.
62	38	"Episode 62"	Taylan Brothers	Yılmaz Şahin	May 30, 2012	15.93
The harem is in deep sadness. Suleiman appoints Mahidevran as manager of the harem. Daye blames herself for Valide's death. She understands that by hiding Nigar’s tricks, she drove Valide to a stroke, gives all her property to her foundation and gets a job as a maid in a rich house in Istanbul. Nigar makes an attempt to escape from Gulsah, but she is caught and, together with Gulsah, is sent to Nigar’s house. Ibrahim is concerned about Nigar's disappearance and orders a search of her house, but Gulsah hides Nigar in the basement. From Sumbul, Hurrem learns about Daye's situation. She orders him to bring the former haznedar to her, but Daye assures Sumbul that she is going to leave for her homeland. Hurrem sincerely understands her pain and tries to help, but Daye commits suicide. While Suleiman is trying to make peace with Beyhan, Hurrem throws a note to Hatice, where he talks about Ibrahim’s betrayal and indicates the house where his mistress lives. Mahidevran borrows more and more money from Rakel Hatun. Hatice tells Beyhan and Gulfem about the note and heads to the house of her husband’s mistress. Nigar stuns Gulsah and runs out into the courtyard, where she comes face to face with Hatice.
63	39	"Episode 63"	Taylan Brothers	Yılmaz Şahin	June 6, 2012	15.06
Hatice, seeing the pregnant Nigar, demands an explanation from her who the father of her unborn child is, to which Nigar swears that it is Matrakchi Nasuh Efendi. Matrakci decides not to give her away and confirms this version, but Hatice does not believe them and secretly hides Nigar in her palace. Suleiman overhears Mustafa telling his younger brothers that he will one day ascend the throne. This makes Suleiman come to the conclusion that he is one step closer to shedding the blood of his eldest son. Gulfem openly opposes Mahidevran, and Hurrem advises her rival to go to the Sultan and ask to deprive her of the status of managing the harem. Mahidevran asks Ibrahim for help. He promises to look into the situation, but Iskender encourages Rakel Hatun to complain to Gulfem. Ibrahim finds out that he killed the wrong person. The real Efendi Hazretleri turns out to be Iskender Celebi. Gulfem tries to talk to Mahidevran about her debts, but she drives her away. Gulfem threatens to tell the Sultan about everything. Ibrahim confesses to Hatice about his betrayal with Nigar. She decides to divorce Ibrahim and execute Nigar after giving birth. Gulsah returns to the harem as Hurrem's servant. An attack was carried out on Gulfem, for which everyone blames Mahidevran. Suleiman learns about Mahidevran's large financial debt and the attack on Gulfem. The Sultan tells her that she failed and takes away her power over the harem. Suleiman calls Hurrem to his place and says that from now on she will manage the harem.

=== Season 3 (2012–2013) ===
İbrahim's adultery becomes common knowledge. Hatice, who had wanted to divorce him, tries to save their marriage. Nigar gives birth to a child, and is told that her baby was stillborn; Hatice actually sent the child away, and hides the truth from İbrahim and Nigar. Süleyman becomes suspicious of İbrahim, informed about his hunger for power. He executes İbrahim and sends his body to Ibrahim's palace. Hatice, distraught at the death of her beloved, disowns Süleyman. Hatice and Mahidevran plan to kill Hürrem by sending Diana, Mahidevran's servant, to murder her as revenge; however, she begins to serve Hürrem. Şah Sultan, Süleyman's sister, begins to plot against Hürrem. Hürrem convinces Mihrimah to marry Rüstem to form an alliance against Şah and Hatice. Mihrimah gives birth to a daughter, Ayşe Hümaşah. Nigar returns to Istanbul, and joins Şah and Hatice to take revenge on Rüstem. They help Nigar enter the palace of Rüstem and Mihrimah and tell her to kill Rüstem and Hürrem at night; when she sees Mihrimah's daughter, however, she remembers her own daughter and takes the child away. When Rüstem finds her, Nigar gives the baby back, and commits suicide. Mustafa meets the Austrian ambassador, which leads to conflict with Süleyman. After the war is over, Mustafa is sent to govern Amasya. Hürrem receives a fake letter telling her that Selim is seriously ill. She decides to go to Konya to see her son, and is captured and imprisoned. Hatice is revealed to be responsible, and commits suicide before Süleyman can find out where Hürrem is. She dies thinking that she had avenged İbrahim's death by taking Hürrem from Süleyman. Malkoçoğlu Bali Bey finds a lead and follows it to find Hürrem. Mihrimah learns that Şah sent a spy to her palace. She confronts her, threatening to tell her father unless she leaves the city and donates her wealth to Hürrem's charity. Mehmed is murdered by Ilyas, his closest Janissary and a servant of Mahidevran, who transmits a fatal disease to the prince after intentionally injuring him during sword practice. The news reaches Süleyman, who falls into a deep depression. Balı Bey finds and rescues Hürrem, and brings her back to the palace.

No. overall	No. in season	Title	Directed by	Written by	Original release date	Ratings
64	1	"Episode 64"	Taylan Brothers	Yılmaz Şahin	September 12, 2012	10.82
Barbarossa's men rescue a girl, the only survivor of a shipwreck. Together with the rest of the slaves, Barbarossa sends her to Istanbul. Hurrem celebrates her victory, but the harem is restless. Humiliated by Ibrahim's betrayal, Hatice takes out her anger on Hurrem. Mahidevran tells Gulfem about who actually made the attempt on her life. Mahidevran, Hatice and Gulfem unite against Hurrem. Hatice tells her brother about her decision to divorce Ibrahim. Suleiman asks her to think about her husband’s fate herself. Ibrahim leaves the capital. In Manisa, Mustafa feels like a full-fledged ruler. Hurrem is going to move into the Valide's chambers, but Hatice is doing everything to prevent this. She forces Gulfem to complain about Hurrem to the Sultan and give up the position of haznedar. Mahidevran, Hatice and Gulfem decide to find a concubine for Suleiman, from whom he will lose his head and thereby destroy Hurrem. One of the eunuchs tries to save Nigar from prison, but on the way she comes across Hatice. Iskender sends Hurrem Rustem Aga. The girl found by Barbarossa does not end up in the harem, and she is sent to the slave market. With the help of Mihrimah, Hurrem moves to the Valide's chambers. Hatice promises Hurrem that the ruler will have another girl. In response, Hurrem replies that it would not hurt to arrange a harem for Ibrahim. Hatice, losing control of herself, slaps Hurrem in the face.
65	2	"Episode 65"	Taylan Brothers	Yılmaz Şahin	September 19, 2012	10.58
Hatice informs Hurrem that she has decided not to divorce Ibrahim. Suleiman is against Hurrem living in Valide’s chambers. Hurrem takes three girls into his harem - Clara, Nastya and Firuze, found by Barbarossa. Mihrimah really wants her chambers, her tears soften her father’s heart, and Suleiman allows Hurrem to move into Valide’s chambers. While bathing in the hammam, one of the girls notices a strange tattoo on Firuze’s neck, but no one even suspects that Firuze is not just a slave, but a representative of the Persian Safavid dynasty - rivals of the Ottoman Empire. Mustafa meets a village girl named Helena. Suleiman decides to appoint Mustafa as regent of the Sultan for the duration of the campaign. Hatice complains about Hurrem to her brother. Suleiman asks Hatice not to lose heart. While on a hike, Ibrahim meets the poet Tashlyjaly. After a conversation with her brother, Hatice becomes ill, but Firuze saves her. Suleiman's wet nurse Afife Hatun arrives to the palace as a new khaznedar with her servant Kiraz Agha. She immediately adopts her methods of treating girls and punishes Gülşah and Fatma with blows with a falcon. Hurrem is going to improve relations with Afife; however, Hatice turns Afife against her. Hatice asks Afife to choose girls for the evening with the Lord, and offers to take Firuze. Taşlıcalı, on the orders of Iskender, makes an attempt on Ibrahim's life, but an arrow hits one of the warriors. The midwife hired by Ibrahim and Perchem-aga, Hurrem's assistant, try to take Nigar out of Hatice's palace, but at the last moment Nigar goes into labor. Sümbül reports to Hürrem about the plans of Hatice and Afife.
66	3	"Episode 66"	Taylan Brothers	Yılmaz Şahin	September 26, 2012	10.34
Firuze is interested in the woman who saved her. Afife tells her that this is Haseki Hurrem Sultan, the legal wife of Suleiman and the mother of his five children. Gulfem informs Hatice and Mahidevran about the birth of Nigar. Hurrem bursts into Afife’s room with explanations and warns her that she is against the Sultan’s entertainment. Hatice gives instructions to the midwife. During childbirth, Nigar loses consciousness. Iskender informs Suleiman about Ibrahim's plans. The chief treasurer tries to disrupt his plans, but the assassination attempt fails again. Gulfem tells Nigar that her daughter was stillborn. Mustafa is fascinated by Helena and arranges a date with her, hiding his real name. Nigar tries to commit suicide, but nothing works. She begs Hatice to kill her. The names of the girls chosen for the Sultan are kept secret. By order of Hatice, Nigar is being prepared for execution. Hatice is afraid that Hürrem may prevent the celebration in Suleiman’s chambers. Firuza dances in front of Suleiman, and for the first time in many years, the Sultan’s purple scarf does not go to Hurrem. Perchem-aga reports to Hürrem about the death of Nigar's child, but she does not believe it. Rustem overhears their conversation. Ibrahim understands that if he survives, he will return to Nigar. Hurrem tells her husband that if he calls the concubine who received the scarf to him, then her sun will never rise. Despite his wife’s words, Suleiman calls Firuze to his place, where she claims to be an Assyrian slave. Hürrem orders to bring her rival to the laundry.
67	4	"Episode 67"	Taylan Brothers	Yılmaz Şahin	October 3, 2012	10.41
Gulșah makes another mistake: she brings the wrong girl to Hürrem. Meanwhile, Suleiman himself spends the night with Firuze. Gülşah does not know that Hatice brought Nastya to confuse Hürrem. Afife is outraged by the plan of Mahidevran and Hatice. Firuze asks Afife to protect Nastya. She wants to tell the truth to Hürrem. Cihangir begins to feel pain again. The healers cannot help the little shehzade, but Firuze manages to do it. Having fallen for Iskender's trick, Ibrahim goes on a campaign to Tabriz and unexpectedly conquers it. He signs all orders, like Seraskir Sultan Ibrahim. Before leaving, Rustem brings Nigar alive to Hürrem and says that he killed Hatice’s executioners. Mihrimah becomes attached to Firuze. Suleiman spends many nights with Firuze; however, when Hurrem asks if he loves his concubine, he answers no. Mustafa arrives in Istanbul, who will become the regent of the sultanate for the duration of the campaign. Sumbul adds sleeping pills to the girls’ food and hangs Nastya that night together with Gülşah. In the morning the girls are horrified. Hatice is threatened by Hürrem, but Hürrem tells Hatice not to confuse her with Nigar, because Hurrem can stand up for herself. Mahidevran tells Hurrem that soon she will burn in the fire of jealousy, to which Hurrem replies that no fire will burn her, because she herself is fire. Hürrem is interested in what Hatice hopes for in her relationship with Ibrahim, because Hatice took both Nigar and their common child from her husband. Hatice, who received a love letter from Ibrahim, replies that her husband's mistress has already received punishment. In the morning, Hatice sees Nigar alive among the maids.
68	5	"Episode 68"	Taylan Brothers	Yılmaz Şahin	October 10, 2012	10.14
Hatice is stunned by Nigar's appearance. Mahidevran and Gulfem try to stand up for Hatice, but the Sultan’s sister sends everyone away, remains alone with Hürrem and again begins to threaten her. Hatice demands that Nigar be expelled and tries to hit the Sultana, but Hürrem quickly catches her hand. Ibrahim, in order to deprive Iskender of support, executes all his supporters, accusing them of plundering the state treasury. Sumbul is ready to help Nigar escape and warns Hürrem that Nigar is seeking revenge and cannot be trusted. The court sentences Iskender to death. The treasurer asks Rustem to continue his work. Suleiman tells Ibrahim that he decides to pardon him because of Hatice and reproaches him for his connection with Nigar, but the Grand Vizier assures the Sultan that Nigar is just a hobby. Hatice orders Afife to take Nigar under arrest and complains to Mustafa. Mustafa orders Hürrem to get rid of Nigar. Hürrem agrees after the public trial of Nigar and Ibrahim. Iskender is executed. Rustem is very upset by the death of such a supporter. Hatice is forced to agree to Nigar's presence in Topkapi. Hurrem receives a letter addressed to Firuze by Suleiman, and she realizes that her rival is still alive. Rustem destroys Afife’s letter with incriminating evidence on Hürrem. Hürrem feels like she is losing her loved one. Gülşah overhears the conversation between Hatice and Firuze and recognizes the Sultan's true concubine. She manages to tell Nigar about this before she is put in prison on the orders of Hatice. Suleiman regrets the execution of Iskender. Nigar begins to play a double game and gives Gülşah the order to kill Hatice. Waking up, Suleiman swears to Ibrahim that in a year the same fate as Iskender will await him. Gülşah sneaks into Hatice's bedside.
69	6	"Episode 69"	Taylan Brothers	Yılmaz Şahin	October 17, 2012	11.34
Gülşah is going to kill Hatice. She attacks the sultana, but Nigar bursts into the room and kills Gülşah, thereby saving Hatice’s life. Mahidevran, Hatice and Gulfem are sure that Gülşah acted on the orders of Hürrem. Mahidevran advises not to believe Nigar, but no one listens to her. Hürrem understands that Nigar is waiting for Hatice to die and tells her that the hour of revenge will soon come. Hatice demands that Nigar tell the true reason for her action. Suleiman and Ibrahim return from a campaign. Hürrem and the matured Mehmed and Mihrimah are eagerly awaiting Suleiman. Ibrahim tries to beg Hatice's forgiveness. On the very first night, Suleiman invites Hürrem to him, which upsets Firuze. Mihrimah meets Taşlıcalı in the garden. Ibrahim refuses to talk to Nigar and drives her away. Hatice complains to her brother about Hürrem. Rita advises Helena to forget her beloved. Mihrimah takes her mother's side. Mahidevran turns Mustafa against his brothers. Mustafa's favorite Fatma is pregnant. Looking at her, Nigar remembers his pregnancy. Mehmed undergoes the sword ceremony. Suleiman calls Firuze to his place. Hürrem is going to pick up girls for Mehmed's harem and orders Sumbul to take Firuze. Firuze admits to Hürrem that she is the Sultan's concubine.
70	7	"Episode 70"	Taylan Brothers	Yılmaz Şahin	October 24, 2012	9.58
Hürrem, having learned about Firuze’s confession, promises to deal with her. Afife tells everything to the Sultan. He orders the Khaznedar to do everything that is prescribed by the rules of the harem. Nigar admits to Sumbul that she knows who Firuze is, and it was she who advised Hürrem to send her to Mehmed. Firuze is moved to the favorites floor. Hürrem goes to Suleiman to find out the truth, but Hürrem becomes ill and she loses consciousness in her husband’s chambers. Mahidevran arrives in Manisa. Hatice tells Hürrem that she missed the Sultan's mistress. Helena's parents betrothed their daughter to the merchant Abbas Agha, who promised to forgive all debts in return. Hatice continues her dirty game against Hürrem. She blackmails Nigar, reporting to her every step of Hürrem, not knowing that Nigar is playing her own, even more sophisticated game than Hatice. Rustem tells the Sultan that Ibrahim has removed everyone who supports Iskender from their posts. In response, Ibrahim decides to send the groom to a sanjak far from Istanbul. Rustem tells Hürrem everything. She promises to solve the problem, but in return asks to give a gift to one of the harem concubines. During a meeting with Helena, Mustafa asks her if she loves him, to which Helena slaps him and runs away in tears, saying that she is already engaged. Hürrem asks her husband if he loves Firuze, but Suleiman remains silent. Hürrem understands that this is true. With the help of Sumbul, Rustem and Nigar, Hürrem is going to prepare an assassination attempt on Firuze. Mustafa tells Taşlıcalı about his love for Helena. Rita advises Helena to talk to Mustafa. Cihangir becomes ill and Mihrimah decides to help his brother by calling Firuze; however, Hurrem comes in instead and tells her daughter not to go against the will of her mother. By order of Hürrem, poison is added to the food of Suleiman and Firuze. While the Lord is settling matters with Sumbul, Firuze eats food and falls asleep. Rustem enters the Sultan’s chambers and carries Firuze out onto the balcony to throw her down.
71	8	"Episode 71"	Taylan Brothers	Yılmaz Şahin	October 31, 2012	11.05
At the last moment, when Rustem was deciding to throw Firuze from the balcony, Nigar appears and asks him not to do this. Hurrem is outraged by her action; however, Nigar tells Hurrem that there is a way to get rid of Firuze without bloodshed. Hatice decides to make peace with Ibrahim if he throws his farewell letter into the fire. Hatice loses her nerve: she burns the letter herself and asks Ibrahim to return. Ibrahim is going to have a dinner in honor of reconciliation with his wife. Mustafa repays the debt of Helena's family and orders Abbas Agha not to approach them anymore. Helena's father finds out that she is being taken into Shehzade's harem. Hatice, having learned about Nigar’s act, allows her to choose her own husband, but later deprives her of this offer. Firuze suspects Hürrem of an attempt on her life and rushes in with threats. Nigar makes a second attempt at reconciliation with Ibrahim, reminding him of the baby, but he drives his mistress away. In the evening, Ibrahim asks his wife how his daughter died, and Hatice has to deceive her husband. Her conscience does not give her peace, she shares her fears with Gulfem. Firuze complains to the Sultan that Hurrem forbids her to communicate with children and Suleiman promises her that he will take her with him to the hunting lodge. During dinner, Hatice wonders if Hurrem will go with the Sultan. Mihrimah replies that Hurrem will go. When she finds out that it is not Hürrem, but Firuze, who will go with her father, she also refuses to go. Suleiman is stunned by his daughter’s courage and decides to take only Mehmed. Taking advantage of her husband's absence, Hurrem decides to get rid of her rival forever.
72	9	"Episode 72"	Taylan Brothers	Yılmaz Şahin	November 7, 2012	11.07
Having learned that the invitation to the palace was false, Afife and Hatice rush to Topkapi. They find Kiraz-aga tied up in the laundry room. Hatice bursts into Hürrem’s room, demands an explanation from her and threatens her with violence if anything happens to Firuze. Firuze is found in the music room. She says that Hurrem came to talk to her, but in fact, Hurrem and Firuze made a bet: if the Lord chooses Firuze, then Hurrem will voluntarily take poison; if the Lord chooses Hurrem, then Firuze will die. In Manisa, Helena is prepared for the night with shehzade. She recognizes her beloved Mustafa is the heir to the Ottoman throne. Suleiman hints to his entourage that he wants to see Mehmed as his heir. Helena finds out that she has a rival - Fatma. Mihrimah sends a secret message to Taşlıcalı. Hürrem is going to create a charitable foundation using personal savings. Mahidevran takes Helena with hostility. Firuze is going to deprive Hurrem of Thursday night. Hurrem comes to meet Ibrahim at the marble palace, but finds Nigar there. Mihrimah asks his father for forgiveness for her behavior. Hürrem tells Hatice that Ibrahim is still cheating on her. Firuze celebrates the victory, but her joy is overshadowed by the Lord himself. Hürrem is planning to commit suicide. Afife saves her from death. Firuze is surprised that Hurrem is still alive. Ibrahim and Hatice decide to marry Rustem to Nigar. Hurrem finds out that Hatice is hiding the daughter of Ibrahim and Nigar - Kader.
73	10	"Episode 73"	Taylan Brothers	Yılmaz Şahin	November 14, 2012	10.14
Hurrem orders Ibrahim and Nigar's daughter to be brought to the palace and tells Sumbul to keep an eye on her, however, she forbids him to tell Nigar that her daughter is alive. In a conversation with Hurrem, Nigar admits that she herself asked Ibrahim to marry her to Rustem. Suleiman allows Firuze to see Cihangir. Firuze confesses to the Sultan her desire to give birth to a child. Mustafa and Helena come to visit her family. Ibrahim is looking for his daughter's grave. Firuze tries to beg forgiveness from Mihrimah. In a conversation with Ibrahim, Gulfem confesses to him where his daughter’s grave is located, but the child’s body is not there. Fatma tells Fidan that she wants to get rid of Helena. Ibrahim learns that his daughter Kader is alive and is with Hurrem. Fatma tries to drown Helena, but her attempts are interrupted by unexpected contractions. Mustafa and Taşlıcalı find a strange short-haired girl at the market - Diana, a market thief. They bring her to the harem as a slave. Ibrahim and Hürrem make a deal: Ibrahim will get his daughter if he gets rid of Firuze. Fatma gives birth to a son. Mustafa urgently sends a messenger to the Sultan. Mehmed gets his favorite concubine - Clara. Hatice deceives Firuze that she wants to see her in her palace in order to cure Huricihan. On the night before Nikah, a girl appears in Nigar’s room and asks for water, but Sumbul, who did not keep track of Kader, takes the girl. Rustem refuses to spend his wedding night with Nigar, since marriage was undesirable for him. Firuze is sent to a ship, where she has an unexpected meeting with Sumbul. Hürrem sends Kader to Hatice Palace.
74	11	"Episode 74"	Taylan Brothers	Yılmaz Şahin	November 21, 2012	10.78
Ibrahim accepts Kader into the family, but Hatice is against her being in the palace. Mihrimah decides not to miss the chance to meet Taşlıcalı. Clara converts to Islam from Mehmed and receives a new name, Nurbahar. Hatice does not want Kader to communicate with her children, and Ibrahim buys a house for his daughter. Firuze returns to the harem and faces Hurrem, and she realized that Ibrahim did not keep his word. Diana has a conflict with the guards, Mahidevran finds out about this. Mustafa is preparing to meet his family. Suleiman learns the truth about Kader. Hurrem orders Rustem to get rid of Firuze. Mahidevran leaves Diana in Mustafa's harem. Suleiman and his family come to Manisa and name Mustafa’s son his name, which Hurrem is not happy about. Mihrimah and Taşlıcalı continue to meet secretly. Firuze and Afife come to the stable. Suleiman and Mehmed, in disguise, hear insults directed at them. Under Suleiman, Abbas accuses Mustafa of having sex with Helena, which he is against. Fatma threatens Helena, but Hurrem stands up for her. Suleiman blames Mahidevran for Mustafa's decision and decides to leave Manisa. Nigar decides to get closer to her husband, but Rustem does not pay attention to her. Rustem cuts the bridle of Firuze's saddle horse. Matrakchi takes Nigar to Kader's house. Rustem, seeing Firuze unconscious, notices a strange tattoo on her neck. Abbas Agha's man shoots an arrow at Mustafa, but Mehmed blocks him and gets hit by the arrow.
75	12	"Episode 75"	Taylan Brothers	Yılmaz Şahin	November 28, 2012	10.86
Mehmed is on the verge of death. Hurrem suspects Mustafa and Mahidevran of attacking her son. Taşlıcalı finds the archer, but he has to kill him. Nigar learns that Ibrahim will allow her to see her daughter sometimes. Rustem brings Firuze from the forest. Diana continues to make trouble with the girls: she hits Nazli, Hurrem's servant, in the face. During a meeting between Nigar and her daughter, Hatice and Gulfem come to Kader’s house. Firuze comes to her senses in the infirmary. Hatice kicks Nigar out of the house. Nigar threatens to tell Ibrahim everything and complain to the qadi. After Hurrem's tears and prayers, Mehmed comes to his senses and says that he wanted to protect Mustafa. Ibrahim gives his daughter a new name - Esmanur. Fatma is going to separate Mustafa from Helena. Mahidevran takes Diana into her service. Suleiman with his wife and children return to Istanbul. Mustafa is preparing to perform nikkah with Helena. Suleiman, at the request of Ibrahim, appoints Rustem as sanjak bey of Teke; however, Rustem’s departure ceases to please the grand vizier. People loyal to Mustafa find the missing Abbas Agha. Rustem shows Hurrem a drawing of Firuza’s tattoo and says that this is her way to get rid of her concubine. Mustafa kills Abbas Agha with his own hands. Hurrem orders Firuze to be thrown into prison and waits for Afife to tell the Sultan about everything. A messenger from Manisa brings Abbas Agha's head to Suleiman. Suleiman demands an explanation from Hurrem. Hurrem gives the order to bring Firuze, shows Suleiman the tattoo and explains its meaning.
76	13	"Episode 76"	Taylan Brothers	Yılmaz Şahin	December 5, 2012	10.09
Firuze is again thrown into prison. Ibrahim interrogates her, but she refuses to talk to anyone other than the Sultan. Suleiman is faced with a choice: to perform a nikah with Firuze or drive her out of the palace. Fatma tries to kill Helena, but Diana saves the favorite. Firuze leaves the capital, but her people kidnap her and she returns to her state and regains her former power. Mihrimah continues secret meetings with Taşlıcalı. Mahidevran writes a letter to Ibrahim and asks him to come to Bursa and talk to Şehzade Mustafa. Ibrahim tells the ruler that he is heading to Edirne, and he himself is going to Bursa. He writes a response letter to Mahidevran, which is intercepted by Hurrem. Hurrem gives the letter to Suleiman. Suleiman believes that Ibrahim betrayed him and teamed up with Mustafa against him and wants to overthrow him. Nigar kidnaps Esmanur and tries to leave the capital.
77	14	"Episode 77"	Taylan Brothers	Yılmaz Şahin	December 12, 2012	11.48
Suleiman reads Ibrahim's letter about his whereabouts. In Bursa, Ibrahim consoles Mustafa, who is upset about recent events. Matrakchi is busy searching for Nigar. Rustem suspects his wife of greater infidelity. Ibrahim, who returned from Bursa, orders Ayas to come to the Sultan. Suleiman asks Ibrahim about his stay in Bursa. Hurrem continues to turn her husband against Ibrahim and Mustafa. Diana turns against Helena. Rustem intends to divorce Nigar. Nigar and Esmanur are not found in the shelter. On the advice of Ibrahim, Mustafa decides to return Helena to her family. Hurrem is looking for her daughter's secret lover. Ibrahim scolds Taşlıcalı about the letter. Helena leaves Mustafa's harem. Mahidevran is happy with her son’s decision. Taşlıcalı arranges a secret meeting for Mihrimah, but Hurrem finds out her daughter’s secret and insists on parting. Nigar and Esmanur board the ship, but Ibrahim intercepts them and deprives her of the opportunity to see her daughter. Hurrem learns new events. In Manisa, the concubines are trying to get into Mustafa's bed. In a conversation with Rustem, Hurrem insists on temporarily saving the marriage. Ibrahim suspects that Mehmed is being drawn into intrigues against Mustafa. Rustem receives gold from his wife. Ebussuud is both pleased with Zeyneb and upset with Ahmed. Hurrem promises Ayas the position of Grand Vizier with one request: Ayas must fulfill all her conditions. Ibrahim convinces Mehmed that he is not yet ready to have a sanjak. Mahidevran learns about the Sultan's order. Ibrahim persuades Mehmed to talk frankly with his father. Suleiman loses consciousness.
78	15	"Episode 78"	Taylan Brothers	Yılmaz Şahin	December 19, 2012	11.18
Hürrem is shocked to see Suleiman unconscious. Remembering Ibrahim's words, she realizes that he betrayed his friend. Ibrahim hurries to Yahya Efendi for help. Mustafa began to have a bad feeling. Hatice and Ibrahim decide to notify Mustafa about what happened. Suleiman comes to his senses. Mustafa tells his mother about his bad dream related to Ibrahim. When all the relatives came to Suleiman, he orders Ibrahim and Hatice to leave. Ibrahim begins an investigation into the poisoning case. Syumbul does not give money to Kiraz, but Afife brought him to his senses. Nigar comes to visit his daughter, but Hatice kicks her out. From Fidan, Mahidevran learns about the betrayal of the visiting merchant. Ebussuud receives a complaint against Ahmed. Fidan gets hit on the head. Suspicions of this fall on the merchant, but she is found already dead. Hurrem is sure that Mehmed has not grown up to his sanjak. In Istanbul, everyone is preparing for Friday prayers. Ahmed gets a beating from his father. Suleiman sees Yahya. Matrakchi reports that Firuze fell into the hands of the Persians.Hurrema and Rustem continue to monitor Ibrahim. Mahidevran suspects Tashlyjaly of secret feelings for Mihrimah. After a conversation with Hurrem, an attempt is made on Ibrahim.
79	16	"Episode 79"	Taylan Brothers	Yılmaz Şahin	December 26, 2012	12.28
Ibrahim falls into a trap set by Hürrem, but manages to escape. Returning to the palace, Ibrahim, in the presence of Hurrem, tells Suleiman about the attack, without saying who exactly carried it out. Hatice, having learned about what happened to Ibrahim, decides to take revenge on Hürrem and orders her sister Shah and her husband Lutfi Pasha to be summoned to the capital. Meanwhile, in Manisa, Mustafa and Mahidevran continue their search for the spy. Mahidevran sees Tashlijaly burning a letter from Mihrimah and accuses him of being Hurrem’s spy. Tashlyjaly has to admit his feelings for Mihrimah. Gulizar plants a letter on Diana and she is thrown into prison on charges of treason. During interrogation, Diana tells Tashlijali that Gyulizar is the real spy. Mustafa wants to execute Diana and drive Gulizar out of the palace. To take revenge on Hürrem, Ibrahim takes Mehmed with him to the shipyard. Having learned that Mehmed went with Ibrahim, Hurrem is worried and personally rushes to search for his son. Later, having found Mehmed's bloody clothes, Hürrem is even more tormented and goes to Suleiman for help. At this moment, Mehmed appears alive and unharmed. Gulizar, having learned that they want to expel her from the palace, tries to kill Mustafa, but Diana, who has escaped from prison, manages to stop her. Mustafa decides to send Gulizar to Ibrahim. The latter wants to tell Suleiman about the assassination attempt on Mustafa. Hürrem finds herself one step away from falling into her own trap.
80	17	"Episode 80"	Taylan Brothers	Yılmaz Şahin	January 2, 2013	11.65
Ibrahim threatens Hurrem to tell the Sultan about everything. Rustem promises Syumbyul to solve the problem. Ibrahim kills the spy who came for Gulizar. Rustem interrogates his wife about Esmanur. Mihrimah talks to Mehmed about Nurbahar and advises him to quickly end the girl’s pregnancy. Afife notices the absence of Syumbyul. Gulzar is sent for interrogation to the Sultan. Hürrem sees Gulzar on the balcony and tells Sumbul that this is their end. During interrogation by the Sultan, Gulzar refutes what he said to Ibrahim. Accusing Ibrahim of pressure, the girl jumps from the balcony of the Sultan's chambers. Hurrem, with relief, orders Sumbul to take care of the girl’s family. Suleiman angrily demands an explanation from Ibrahim. Mahidevran notices her grandson's fever and scolds Fatma. The doctor tells Mustafa that Sehzade Suleiman has smallpox, and they bring in a Jewish healer to help Suleiman, but he dies from the disease. At the Divan's council, Ibrahim advises Ebussuud to carefully monitor Ahmed Celebi's behavior. In Ibrahim's palace, Suleiman asks Hatice about their sister's arrival. Hatice tells his brother about the attempts on Mustafa and Ibrahim. Mehmed asks his sister not to worry about Nurbahar. Mahidevran accuses Fatma of neglecting the sehzade. Hurrem receives Zeyneb Hatun, the wife of Ebussuud, and the wife of a local rich man, who gives her the Koran bound in gold. Hurrem offers to give the Koran to Ibrahim. Mihrimah and Mehmed threaten to reveal their mother's secrets to each other. Suleiman's third sister, Şah Huban Sultan, comes to Istanbul. She greets Hürrem very warmly, which worries Hatice. While walking through Istanbul, people attacked Ibrahim with accusations.
81	18	"Episode 81"	Taylan Brothers	Yılmaz Şahin	January 9, 2013	12.14
Unable to bear the accusations against him, Ibrahim punishes the instigator. Hurrem denies Suleiman's accusations and shifts the blame to Ibrahim. Fatma blames Hurrem for the death of her son. Mustafa tries to console her. Shehzade Suleiman is buried in Manisa. Mahidevran finds out another concubine, Ayse, is expecting Mustafa's child. Residents of Istanbul headed towards Ibrahim's palace, but the turn of events went in the opposite direction. Şah tells Hatice about the problems. Suleiman asks Ibrahim about his action. Fatma finds out, and attacks Ayse, believing she killed her son. Mahidevran advises Mustafa to expel Fatma as soon as possible. Before they can, Fatma hangs herself. Before leaving, Rustem meets with Hürrem and Suleiman. Nigar says goodbye to Esmanur, and Ibrahim promises her that she will meet her daughter. Hatice insults Hurrem during dinner, but Şah stands up for the Sultana. Mehmed again asks his sister about her affair. Suleiman assures his sister that the consideration of the case will benefit Ibrahim. Saif is sentenced to punishment. Ibrahim receives news of his fate. Upon learning of the court's decision, Hürrem becomes furious and asks for help from Ayas. Mihrimah deceives Mehmed about abortion. Ayas receives Ibrahim's meeting minutes from the Frenchman. Kiraz accidentally finds out about the abortion, and Mihrimah threatens him. Hurrem is delighted with the new plan. Suleiman begins to suspect Ibrahim of infidelity. Kiraz tells Afife about Nurbahar's abortion, and Mihrimah kicks him out of the palace. Mustafa learns about the outcome of the case. Suleiman realizes that Ibrahim has betrayed him and decides to execute him.
82	19	"Episode 82"	Taylan Brothers	Yılmaz Şahin	January 16, 2013	11.84
Suleiman recalls that by the decision of the Divan’s council he protected Ibrahim even from himself and therefore, before executing the death sentence, he decides to consult with Ebusuud Efendi. After listening to the question that worries Suleiman, Ebusuud falls into confusion and asks to give him time to answer. Ibrahim himself knows nothing about Suleiman’s decision and makes happy plans. Hurrem does not understand what is happening around her. She believes that she will never be able to get rid of Ibrahim and that some action must be taken. But by this moment she had not yet seen the true face of Shah Sultan. Therefore, Hurrem is happy, believing that the relationship between them is very good and invites Shah to join her charitable foundation. But as soon as her husband Lutfi Pasha and daughter Esmahan arrive in Istanbul, the Shah begins to reveal his true intentions. Sehzade Mehmed greatly regrets that his favorite Nurbahar had an abortion and blames himself for everything. However, Mehmed soon learns that the order to get rid of the child was given by Mihrimah. The relationship between brother and sister begins to deteriorate. After Hurrem intervenes in their quarrel, the situation escalates almost to the limit. Shehzade Mustafa arrives at a farm in Saruhan, where he comes across an item that once belonged to Ibrahim Pasha. Mustafa is immersed in memories of the past. Suleiman receives a response from Ebusuud Efendi which says that during the execution of Ibrahim, the Sultan will have to sleep. In the evening, Suleiman asks Ibrahim to stay overnight in the palace. Unsuspecting Ibrahim happily accepts the master's offer. As soon as Suleiman falls asleep, four mute executioners enter Ibrahim's chambers and strangle him.
83	20	"Episode 83"	Taylan Brothers	Yılmaz Şahin	January 23, 2013	13.00
The executioners carry Ibrahim's dead body out of the chambers. Syumbul sees this and wakes up Hurrem to tell her the news about Ibrahim’s execution. Hurrem is shocked, because she has long given up hope that her long-time sworn enemy will finally die. In the morning, Hatice goes out onto the balcony and discovers a coffin with Ibrahim under the windows. She becomes hysterical and goes to Topkapi Palace to ask Suleiman about the reasons for the murder of her beloved husband. Matrakchi, on the orders of the Sultan, buries Ibrahim in a secret place that even the Sultan himself will not know about. The Shah, having learned about Ibrahim's death from Merjan Agha and Afife Hatun, is shocked. Hatice tells Suleiman that she no longer considers herself his sister, and then meets Hurrem and accuses her of killing Ibrahim. At night, Hatice meets the spirit of Ibrahim on the balcony, and then tries to commit suicide, but Shah saves her. She swears to her sister that she will help her avenge her husband's death.
84	21	"Episode 84"	Taylan Brothers	Yılmaz Şahin	January 30, 2013	11.17
While returning to Istanbul, Malkocoglu is attacked by the Pope's men. Meanwhile, the Pope himself learns of Ibrahim's death. Gulfem invites Afife to take Fahriye to the palace. Hatice, against the wishes of her brother, leaves all the sculptures in her garden. Mustafa reminds Ayas Pasha of Ibrahim's successes. The Shah swears to Hatice that the death of Ibrahim will not go unpunished for Hurrem. Fahriye takes up her duties. Hurrem is going to organize a holiday in honor of the end of Ramadan. Mehmed asks his father to send him to the sanjak, but Suleiman refuses him this. Mahidevran gives Tashlyjaly an ultimatum: either loyalty to Mustafa or love for Mihrimah. Malkocoglu learns about Ibrahim's death. Mahidevran informs Hatice about the holiday. Suleiman decides to take Lutfi Pasha to the Divan council. Mehmed suspects that his father refused him because of Mustafa. Hatice bursts into Hurrem's harem with insults and reproaches. Mihrimah tries to stand up for his mother, but to avoid problems, Hurrem asks her daughter to leave. Suleiman watches this scene and asks his sister to return to the palace, because Hurrem acted with his consent. Mihrimah learns about her separation from Tashlyjaly. Shah attracts Nigar to hers side. Matrakchi attacks Rustem with accusations. Mahidevran rejoices at the separation of Mihrimah and Tashlyjaly. Hatice still finds no place for herself after the death of her husband. Mustafa and Mahidevran leave for Manisa. Fahriye is in the hamam preparing an assassination attempt on Hürrem on the orders of Hatice.
85	22	"Episode 85"	Taylan Brothers	Yılmaz Şahin	February 6, 2013	11.58
Hatice's plan failed. Fahriye did not have time to kill Hurrem, but managed to gain her trust. Shah Sultan takes the murder of Hurrem upon himself, and Fahriye now serves her. Suleiman finds out that Hatice is involved in the assassination attempt and sends her into exile in Manisa along with her children. Shah Huban moves to her sister's palace. Fahriye is appointed kalfa for the “salvation” of Hurrem. Suleiman, Rustem, Bali Bey, Ayas Pasha, Lutfi Pasha, as well as Shehzade Mehmed and Selim go on a hike. Shah Sultan arranges a dinner with Hurrem and Afife hatun. Sumbul aga receives the news and immediately reports it to Hurrem, the Sultana meets with Mustafa Pasha and finds out that these terrible news are true...
86	23	"Episode 86"	Taylan Brothers	Yılmaz Şahin	February 13, 2013	11.99
Hurrem learns terrible news: the army was ambushed, Suleiman was mortally wounded and apparently died, and Rustem, Malkocoglu, Shehzade and Pashi were most likely captured; Shehzade Mustafa, who learned about this, was the first to gather an army and will soon leave for the capital to conquer Istanbul and sit on the throne. Bayazid, Jihangir and Mihrimah move to Hurrem's chambers. Hürrem understands that this matter has only two outcomes: to remain inactive and die along with his sons at the hands of Mustafa, or to elevate Bayezid to the throne. Shah Sultan wants to hand over Bayazid and Cihangir to Mustafa for execution. Hurrem resists and sends her sons and Fahriye far beyond the capital. The carriage is attacked and all three are kidnapped. Fahriye runs away and tells where Shehzade is hidden. Hurrem seizes the house in which they are being kept, but instead of children he discovers Shah Sultan and Merjan Aga. The Shah informs Hurrem that Suleiman is in perfect order, Mustafa did not gather an army and did not even intend to go to the capital, and Bayazid and Cihangir returned to the palace. Hürrem realizes that Shah is now her sworn enemy and vows to take revenge on her.
87	24	"Episode 87"	Taylan Brothers	Yılmaz Şahin	February 20, 2013	10.31
Hatice reads Shah Sultan a love letter to Ibrahim, which she supposedly wrote. She accuses her sister of betrayal and demands to leave the palace. Afife and Gulfem understand that Hatice is going to return to her palace. Shah Sultan suspects Hurrem of what happened. Nigar comes to the palace. Sumbul assures Nigar that Shah is to blame for Ibrahim’s death. Hurrem visits Shah and offers her help. Mercan attacks Nazli, Hurrem's servant. Hatice receives advice from Gulfem - not to trust Hurrem and not to quarrel with Shah. By order of Shah Sulta, n Nazli is sent to prison. After Merjan's threats, she confesses to Shah that she planted a love note for Hatice on Hürrem's orders. Hurrem sees Nazli dead. Hatice accuses Hurrem of shedding innocent blood because of her intrigues. In Manisa, Mustafa meets Signora Gabriela, a Genoese merchant's wife. During the campaign, Suleiman lacks the support of Ibrahim. He decides to stop the hike because winter is approaching. Hatice is going to spoil Hurrem. Mihrimah meets with Malkochoglu, while Esmahan is watching her. There is still no agreement between Bayezid and Selim. Hatice notices Mihrimah and Bali Bey in the garden. Nigar reports to Hurrem about the meeting between Malkocoglu and Mihrimah in the marble pavilion. Hürrem goes there, but sees Hatice there. While talking to her, Hurrem is attacked by Saliha and Hurrem loses consciousness.
88	25	"Episode 88"	Taylan Brothers	Yılmaz Şahin	February 27, 2013	10.67
Waking up in his chambers with memory loss, Hurrem discovers strange spots on her hands. Shah suspects Hatice of something wrong. Suleiman tells Yahya Efendi about a bad dream. Rustem suspects that not all of Ibrahim’s gold was found. The doctor claims that Hurrem is suffering from a nervous disorder. Mihrimah promises her mother to take care of her brothers. Suleiman learns about Hurrem's illness and asks Yahya Effendi for help. Rustem suspects Nigar in the case against Hurrem. Thanks to the ointment, the spots on Hurrem’s hands disappear. Having escaped death, Nigar tells Hurrem about her spell. Ebussuud tells Suleiman about affairs in Istanbul. Hürrem blames Hatice and Shah for what happened. Hatice wants to stay in her palace. Hurrem is haunted by nightmares and cannot sleep. Suleiman convenes a council regarding the Venetians who sided with Charles. Rustem learns about Mihrimah's sympathy for Bali Bey, and out of jealousy writes a letter on his behalf. At night, Hurrem's illness reaches the point of hallucinations. A search for Ibrahim's gold begins, and Hatice rushes to the Sultan and blames him for Ibrahim's death. Hurrem decides to put an end to the gossip, but she fails, and when she meets Hatice in the corridor, she beats her.
89	26	"Episode 89"	Taylan Brothers	Yılmaz Şahin	March 6, 2013	11.44
Hurrem is forced to get rid of traces of what happened. Afife finds Hatice's earring. The search for Ibrahim's gold was unsuccessful. Barbarossa tells Mustafa about the long-ago arson of Gabriela's goods. Gulfem and Shah huban discover that Hatice is missing. Afife comes to her son and asks for a cure for Hurrem. Shah suspects Hurrem of what happened. The official interrogation of the servants began in the harem. Suleiman finds out about his sister's disappearance and blames himself for it. In the forest, the bloodied Hatice regains consciousness and with difficulty makes it to the palace. She tells the Lord about what happened to her. Fortunately, Hurrem manages to prove the opposite to her husband. The Janissaries find Saliha, and Suleiman interrogates her. Gabriela tells Mustafa about her grief and deceives him about her sister's death. Hatice shows her sister the place where Ibrahim's gold is located. Ayas Pasha tells the Lord the reason for the removal of many people from their positions. Yahya Effendi gives Hurrem instructions for recovery. Gabriela asks her former friend, Signor Benita, for the whereabouts of her sister. Balibey understands that Rustem is behind the letter written by Mihrimah. Sümbül finds objects for damage in Saliha’s room and discovers her, killed by Fahriye, together with Hurrem. They realize that Fahriye is behind this, and at night Hürrem tries to protect himself from her.
90	27	"Episode 90"	Taylan Brothers	Yılmaz Şahin	March 13, 2013	11.16
Hurrem loses her composure: she believes that Fahriye was sent to kill her. Hatice and Shah are looking for someone who obeys Hurrem, and settle on Shahin Agha. Suleiman, during the fight on the matrak, again remembers Ibrahim. Mihrimah tells Esmahan that the letter written on behalf of Malkochoglu was not written by him. Mihrimah suspects Esmahan of this. Shah Sultan tells Fahriye that she knows how she wrote the letter to Mahidevran and orders her to obey only her. Gulfem tells Hatice and Shah about Fahriye's action. The Shah gives the order to Fahriye to kill Sahin Agha and gives Jafer Agha as her assistant. But after the murder of Shahin Agha, Fahriye herself finds herself in a death trap. Jafer Agha tries to kill Hurrem, but Fahriye saves her. She confesses everything to Hurrem and goes over to her side. Mercan reports to Hatice and Shah that Shahin and Jafer are dead. The Sultan's sisters understand that Fahriye has become their enemy. Fahriye tells Hurrem that Saliha Hatun poisoned Hurrem with incense. Merjan is appointed senior aga in Topkapi. Hatice continues to hide Ibrahim's gold. Ayas Pasha removes Kasim Pasha from his post. Mahidevran is concerned about Mustafa's frequent meetings with Gabriela. The new slave of Mustafa's harem, Rumeysa, attracts the attention of Mahidevran. Mihrimah receives a letter from Bali Bey. In the palace, Hatice and Shah are loading Ibrahim's gold, but their plans are disrupted by the unexpected appearance of the Lord, accompanied by Rustem and guards.
91	28	"Episode 91"	Taylan Brothers	Yılmaz Şahin	March 20, 2013	11.08
Having complicated the matter of Hurrem and Rustem, Malkocoglu takes the gold to the palace. Mihrimah understands that Bali Bey does not want to be with her. Having learned about the order of the Lord Mustafa to execute Ramazanoglu Piri Pasha, Hurrem wants to denigrate Mustafa in the eyes of the Sultan with the help of Rustem. In the tavern, Rustem saves and takes Olivia Hatun into his service. Suleiman decides to marry Hatice and gives her a new palace. Mustafa goes on a hike. Gabriela gives Mahidevran a mirror of sin. During archery, Selim spoils Bayezid's bow, and in response, the latter allowed himself to insult his brother. During the campaign, Mustafa calls Piri Pasha for questioning, and he proves the opposite. False rumors spread in the harem about the relationship between Malkocoglu and Esmehan. Hurrem wants to build his mosque in the slave market quarter. Shah-y-Huban decides to marry Malkochoglu to her daughter. Mustafa, against the will of the Sultan, kills Iskender Pasha along with the army. Suleiman gives the order to prepare for the campaign against Moldova. The beylerbey of Rumelia, Hüsrev Pasha, arrives in the capital. Suleiman appoints him vizier of the council and decides to marry him to his sister. Hatice learns about Suleiman's choice regarding the wedding. Hurrem finds out about the meeting between Malkochoglu and Esmehan and decides to come to them, but finds Mihrimah with Bali Bey.
92	29	"Episode 92"	Taylan Brothers	Yılmaz Şahin	March 27, 2013	10.62
Suleiman's decision to marry off his sister infuriates Hatice. Mustafa wants to meet with his father to discuss what happened. Hürrem orders Mihrimah to immediately end all relations with Malkocoglu, but Mihrimah reminds her mother of the oath she made to her when Mihrimah was a child. To the surprise of Shah Sultan Hatice, he still agrees to marry Husrev Pasha. Rustem informs the Sultan that Mustafa violated his father's will. In Manisa, Gabriela comes to Mahidevran, but she drives her away and advises her not to appear in the palace again. Mustafa receives orders to immediately arrive in Istanbul. He proves that he is right. Mihrimah continues to openly mock Esmehan. Esmehan tells her mother that she is ready to marry Bali Bey. Having learned about the impending marriage of Esmehan and Malkochoglu, Mihrimah rushes to his father to beg him to ban this marriage. At the Lord's chambers, she encounters her mother, who reports that Malkocoglu refused the marriage, declaring that his heart belongs to another. Mihrimah calls Bali Bey for a frank conversation, in which she learns that he does not have any feelings for her. Bayezid, upset that he was not taken on the campaign again, decides to go with the army secretly. Gabriela enters the palace to meet with Rumeisa, but her plans are thwarted by Mahidevran. Mutual barbs between Mihrimah and Esmehan escalate into a fight.
93	30	"Episode 93"	Taylan Brothers	Yılmaz Şahin	April 3, 2013	10.19
Hurrem is looking for Bayazid. Meanwhile, Shehzade himself, dressed as a Janissary, hurries to his father’s camp. Fearing that Esmehan has killed, Mihrimah asks Afife for help. Together they decide to tell Shah Sultan everything. Mustafa doesn't know what to do with Gabriela. She manages to tell Rumeysa about her origin. Esmehan, who has come to her senses, covers for Mihrimah. Cihangir reveals his brother's plans to his mother. In one of the Janissaries, Selim recognizes Bayezid. He reports Bayezid to Suleiman, who orders his son to return to the capital. Despite her daughter’s assurances, Shah Sultan has no doubt about Mihrimah’s guilt. Gabriela reveals to Mustafa the true reason for her rapprochement with Sehzade. She asks him to grant freedom to Rumeysa, but he refuses and orders the woman to leave the country. Discontent is brewing in the harem due to delayed salaries. The Shah offers her help, but Hurrem refuses. She asks for help from a Jewish woman who also lent money to Valide Sultan. Mustafa allows Rumeysa to leave the harem, but she, to everyone’s surprise, refuses. Esmahan's revenge overtakes Mihrimah. Sumbul, who was carrying money from Rakel Hatun, is attacked and all the gold is taken away. The concubines are close to rebellion. Shah Sultan decides to pay them a salary from her own funds.
94	31	"Episode 94"	Taylan Brothers	Yılmaz Şahin	April 10, 2013	10.05
Mihrimah tells Esmahan that she will do everything to disgrace her. Hurrem demands that Shah Sultan stop interfering in the affairs of the harem. Suleiman orders the execution of the offending soldiers. During the execution, all eyes are on Selim. Hurrem tells the moneylender about the missing money and again asks her for a loan, but she refuses her because she no longer has that kind of money. Rakel hatun tells Hurrem that only the Venetians can help her. Mustafa is going to build a fleet to fight the Corsicans. The unrest in the harem does not subside. Rustem intercepts Mustafa's letter to his father. Hurrem sets Mihrimah against Mustafa and Mahidevran. Impressed, Mihrimah gives her mother an oath to help her in everything. Hurrem borrows money from a Venetian merchant's wife. To pay off her debts, Hurrem decides to sell one of her estates. Shah Sultan finds out about this. Having paid off her debts, Hurrem falls into a trap: the receipt given by Hurrem to the Venetian woman has disappeared. The Shah accuses Hurrem of treason and says that she will tell her brother about everything. She decides not to hesitate and goes to meet the Sultan. On the way she is attacked. Shah tells her brother about what happened and adds that she has evidence of his wife’s betrayal.
95	32	"Episode 95"	Taylan Brothers	Yılmaz Şahin	April 17, 2013	9.59
After a conversation with his sister, Suleiman gives the order to Bali Bey to bring Hurrem to Edirne. Hurrem is trying to find the Venetian woman. Mihrimah tries to call Malkochoglu to a frank conversation. Hatice is trying to find her husband's grave. Suspecting that Nigar knows something, she orders him to follow her. Mustafa, without waiting for an answer from his father, continues to work on the fleet. Mahidevran tries to warn her son, but he asks her not to meddle in men’s affairs. Despite his wife’s eloquence, Suleiman understands that Shah Sultan told the truth. He decides to leave Hürrem in Edirne. Shah Sultan makes fun of Hurrem. Hurrem tells her not to rejoice ahead of time: she will find a way to return to the palace. Having learned about her mother’s exile, Mihrimah asks her father for permission to go to her, but he refuses. Shah Sultan invites Rustem to go over to her side. Shah Sultan tries to convince Hatice that marriage will benefit her. Rustem decides to play the card with Mustafa's fleet. Rustem agrees to go over to Shah’s side if she arranges a marriage for him with Mihrimah. Shah Sultan indignantly rejects this proposal. Rustem, with the help of cunning, is going to get Hurrem’s consent to marry Mihrimah.
96	33	"Episode 96"	Taylan Brothers	Yılmaz Şahin	April 24, 2013	9.97
Mihrimah and Cihangir visit their mother in Edirne. Shah Sultan is trying to lure Ayas Pasha to her side. Mustafa decides to take the fleet to sea under his command. Hurrem has doubts about the need for the wedding of Mihrimah and Rustem. She decides to find out whether Malkocoglu's feelings for her daughter are mutual. Having received the answer, Hurrem agrees to the marriage. Mihrimah seeks support from Bali Bey. Lutfi Pasha convinces his wife that he should take the post of Grand Vizier. Ayas Pasha discovers a woman with the plague in his bed. Suleiman, finding Hatice in the house of Shah Sultan, orders her to immediately move to her husband. The chief physician discovers a plague in Edirne. Hurrem, who was counting on returning to Istanbul, is deeply disappointed by her husband’s decision to transfer her to Bursa. She defiantly decides to stay in Edirne. Ayas Pasha dies. Suleiman returns his wife from exile. Lutfi Pasha becomes Grand Vizier.
97	34	"Episode 97"	Taylan Brothers	Yılmaz Şahin	May 1, 2013	9.38
Shah Sultan insists on Hatice moving to Husrev's house. Hurrem persuades her daughter to agree to marry Rustem. Mustafa again displeases his father. Rumeysa does not give up trying to seduce Mustafa. Mahidevran closely monitors her actions. Suleiman decides to personally meet with Mustafa in Bursa and discuss the situation with the ships. In the palace of the Venetian ambassador, Bali Bey meets with Sylvia, who captivated him during a visit to Italy. Hurrem sends Shah Sultan Arsen hatun to the palace to seduce Lutfi Pasha. Hüsrev Pasha tries to win Hatice’s favor, but despite all attempts, she remains cold towards him. In Bursa, Suleiman warns Mustafa against rash actions. He also gives the family ring to Mehmed, showing more favor to him than to Mustafa. Malkochoglu learns that Mihrimah organized surveillance of him. In Manisa, Mustafa tells Mahidevran about his trip to Bursa. Hurrem calls Malkochoglu for a frank conversation about Mihrimah. The girl herself hears this conversation. In the evening she agrees to marry Rustem.
98	35	"Episode 98"	Taylan Brothers	Yılmaz Şahin	May 8, 2013	8.73
Having learned about the upcoming marriage with Mihrimah, Rustem divorces Nigar. Mashuki, despite the ban, continues to preach in Istanbul. To prevent Rustem's rise, Hatice and Shah Sultan plan to kill him. Mihrimah asks Mehmed for help, but he is unable to change anything. In Manisa they learn about the upcoming celebration. Mihrimah begs her mother to cancel the wedding. Lutfi reports to the Sultan that Rustem is sick with leprosy, which means there can be no talk of any wedding. Hatice attacks her husband when he tries to get closer to her children. Shah intimidates the palace doctor so that he makes the “correct” diagnosis of Rustem. Hurrem tells Shah Sultan about the affair between Lutfi Pasha and Arsen Hatun. Her words are confirmed by Merjan Agha. Malkocoglu breaks up with Sylvia. The doctor discovers lice on Rustem, which means that he is completely healthy. Nigar learns from Nasuh Effendi where Esmanur is and goes in search of her. On the way to the capital, Rustem's carriage explodes.
99	36	"Episode 99"	Taylan Brothers	Yılmaz Şahin	May 15, 2013	9.24
The news of Rustem's death spreads throughout the palace and reaches the Lord. He orders an investigation to begin. At this time, to the disappointment of Shah Sultan and Mihrimah, Rustem appears in the palace. The Sultan announces the upcoming celebrations for the wedding of Mihrimah and Rustem and introduces the latter to the council of the divan. Mahidevran accuses Hurrem of being ready to sacrifice the happiness of her only daughter for her own benefit. After the wedding, when the newlyweds are left alone in the chambers, Rustem makes an offer to his wife: if she does not want to be with him, then he will commit suicide right now. Rustem is about to drink poison, but Mihrimah stops him. A year has passed. Mihrimah and Rustem have a daughter, Ayse Humasah Sultan. Shah Sultan, knowing about Mihrimah's problems, sends the nurse Emine to her. She is also going to get rid of Hurrem: with Mehmed leaving for the sanjak, Hurrem will have to go with him. Nigar returns to Istanbul after a fruitless search for Esmanur. The Sultan decides to send not only Mehmed, but also Selim and Bayazid to the sanjaks. Mehmed is appointed to Amasya, Selim to Konya, Bayezid to Kutahya. However, Hurrem does not agree with this arrangement of affairs. She is going to go with Mehmed to Manisa. Sah Sultan sends Nigar to kill Rustem and Hurrem, but she goes crazy without her daughter and steals Mihrimah's daughter.
100	37	"Episode 100"	Taylan Brothers	Yılmaz Şahin	May 29, 2013	8.98
In the middle of the night, Rustem and Mihrimah learn about the disappearance of Humasah. Hurrem accuses Sah Sultan and Lutfi Pasha of the missing child. Meanwhile, Rustem finds out that Nigar is involved in the kidnapping. With a detachment of Janissaries, he overtakes the fugitive on the edge of a cliff. Matrakci, after long negotiations, takes the girl, and Nigar jumps down. Mustafa becomes depressed, thinking that his father has lost interest in him. Meanwhile, Sehzade Mehmed, Sehzade Selim and Sehzade Bayezid must go to their sanjaks. Rustem prepares a trap for Mustafa. Suleiman learns about the meeting of the Austrian ambassadors with Mustafa and becomes furious. News of the reprisal against a Muslim woman caught in prostitution reaches Sah Sultan. She demands an explanation from her husband, after which she decides to divorce him. Lutfi Pasha attacks his wife with his fists. Suleiman finds out about this. Lutfi Pasha was removed from his post and was to be executed, but Esmehan begs her mother to help her father. Suleiman decides to send Lutfi Pasha into exile in Dimetoku. Suleiman Pasha was appointed the new Grand Vizier, contrary to tradition.
101	38	"Episode 101"	Taylan Brothers	Yılmaz Şahin	June 5, 2013	7.71
Suleiman reprimands Mustafa for inappropriate conversations with ambassadors. He orders his son to leave Manisa and move to Amasya. Instead, Mehmed will rule Manisa. Mustafa is unhappy with his father's decision. Realizing that Hurrem is behind this appointment, Mahidevran goes to her. Hurrem refuses to talk to her, and Mahidevran has no choice but to convey his threats through Sumbul. Suleiman goes on a campaign with Mehmed, while Mustafa remains in the capital. A letter comes from Sehzade Selim to Hurrem Sultan, in which he writes that he is very sick and wants to see her. Hurrem goes to Konya. Mihrimah learns that the letter was fake. Hürrem finds himself in a trap. Sah blames Hatice for what happened. Having learned about Selim's illness, Suleiman decides to return to the capital as soon as possible. There he is met by Mustafa with the news that Hurrem is missing.
102	39	"Episode 102"	Taylan Brothers	Yılmaz Şahin	June 12, 2013	8.00
Suleiman is furious and looks for the culprit. Mihrimah talks about a letter informing about Selim's illness. Mehmed accuses Mustafa of involvement in the kidnapping of Hurrem. Rustem takes advantage of this to finally quarrel between the brothers. Bali Bey interrogates the Sultan's sisters, as well as Mustafa and Mahidevran. At this time, Rustem is interrogating Merjan in the dungeon. Mehmed apologizes to Mustafa. A servant who accompanied Hurrem appears in the palace. He talks about the attack, and Suleiman decides to immediately go in search of his wife. But in the forest he finds only a ring. Two years pass. Suleiman is in apathy: he doesn’t care about everything except the fate of his beloved Hurrem. Mahidevran is plotting the murder of Mehmed, who has become the sanjak-bey of Manisa. Mustafa does not want to communicate with anyone, for fear of harming them. Hatice tells Suleiman that she caused Hürrem’s disappearance. In order not to give away Hürrem’s location and to get rid of her forever, Hatice drinks poison. Saying that Hurrem will not have a grave, just as Ibrahim does not have one, Hatice dies in the arms of her brother.
103	40	"Episode 103"	Taylan Brothers	Yılmaz Şahin	June 19, 2013	8.21
Barbarossa encourages Mustafa. By order of Mahidevran, Mehmed's close servant Ilyas attempts to kill him, but it fails. Having lost his sister and wife, Suleiman decides to go on a hike. Mihrimah, who remained in charge of the harem, forbids Sah to appear in the capital. Ilyas infects Mehmed with smallpox. Mehmed dies. Suleiman falls into deep sadness. Only Hurrem's miraculous return saves him. Having fulfilled the Lord's wish, Malkocoglu leaves Istanbul.

=== Season 4 (2013–2014) ===
Hürrem returns and plans to ensure that one of her sons ascends the throne. Rüstem is chosen as the new Grand Vizier. When Mehmed dies, the princes are recalled to the capital from their provinces so Süleyman can choose the next governor of Manisa, choosing Selim. A new group of slaves is brought to the palace, including Cecilia Baffo, daughter of a Venetian nobleman. She is chosen by Hürrem, who makes her pledge loyalty to her before sending her to Selim's harem, and changes her name to Nurbanu. Süleyman decides to send Mustafa a kaftan as a sign of respect for his son, but Hürrem orders her servants to secretly poison it. After receiving the gift, Mustafa (who thinks his father wanted to kill him) prepares a campaign and marches on the capital. Janissaries prevent Mustafa's army from entering the capital; he and his father meet at the court, and he tells Süleyman about what had transpired. Süleyman, now reconciled with his son, becomes seriously ill. Mustafa meets Bayezid and Cihangir, and promises that he would never kill them after taking the throne; they support Mustafa as the heir to the throne. Hürrem learns about her two younger sons' intentions, and supports Selim; Rüstem and Mihrimah support Bayezid. Hürrem, with the help of Rüstem and Mihrimah, sends a forged letter from Mustafa to the Persian Shah Tahmasp I plotting against Süleyman. Thinking that Mustafa has betrayed him when he sees his seal on the letter, Süleyman has Mustafa executed. Cihangir, who deeply loved his elder brother, dies of grief. With three of his sons dead, a war for the throne begins between Süleyman's two remaining sons; Selim is supported by Nurbanu, his wife and the mother of his son Murad, while Bayezid is supported by Hürrem; Süleyman favors their elder son, Selim. Hürrem becomes incurably ill, and dies soon after. About a year after their mother's death, Bayezid amasses a large army and goes to war against Selim. Süleyman, angered by Bayezid's actions, agrees to his death; this infuriates Mihrimah. Bayezid and his sons flee to Persia, but they're betrayed by Rüstem and executed by Selim. Before their deaths, Mihrimah avenges her brother's death by having Rüstem executed. Selim is left as crown prince and the only heir to the throne. Furious, Mihrimah leaves the palace but remains one of the most powerful women in the Ottoman Empire. Mihrimah sends Safiye Hatun to Murad's harem, and she quickly becomes his favorite and mother of his child, to Nurbanu's displeasure. Süleyman's health gradually deteriorates, but he decides to go to war one last time to inspire his soldiers. He dies during the battle of Szigetvár, as the Ottomans are victorious.

No. overall	No. in season	Title	Directed by	Written by	Original release date	Ratings
104	1	"Episode 104"	Mert Baykal & Yağız Alp Akaydın	Yılmaz Şahin	September 18, 2013	9.15
In 1546, Hurrem's return does not bring her joy: Mehmed is dead, her younger sons have grown up, and Hurrem herself has grown old. Hurrem, who sometimes spends time in the company of an old fortune teller, is upset. However, Suleiman is very happy about the return of his beloved. Suleiman calls the princes to the capital to decide who will rule Manisa. Mustafa arrives in the capital with his mother, pregnant Rumeysa and daughter Nergissah. On the way, he is met by the Janissaries led by Ali Agha and escorted to the palace with full honors. Rustem Pasha takes advantage of this fact and tells everything to the Sultan during the reception arranged for the princes. Cihangir, with the support of his father, undergoes the ceremony of presenting the sword. At the same time, Mahidevran tells Hurrem that Cihangir is retribution for all her sins. Rustem and Mihrimah are doing everything so that Bayezid goes to Manisa. Hurrem tells Sumbul to choose new girls for all the sehzades. The captive Venetian Cecilia, the illegitimate daughter of the Doge, ends up in the harem. Mihrimah learns that Bayezid has fallen into debt. Cecilia, yearning for her old life, opens her veins. Selim saves the girl. A clash occurs again between Selim and Bayezid. Rustem reports that, by the will of the Lord, Manisa will be ruled by Selim.
105	2	"Episode 105"	Mert Baykal & Yağız Alp Akaydın	Yılmaz Şahin	September 25, 2013	9.30
Bayezid, in anger, demands an explanation from his mother, which ultimately leads to even more tense relations between the brothers. Mustafa is disappointed again. Meanwhile, Cecilia, having learned about Selim's appointment to a high post, begins to implement a dangerous plan. She asks Sumbul to send her to Selim's harem. Hurrem, in order to take revenge on her enemies, prepares a trap for Mustafa. In the forest, Atmaça and Yavuz, Mustafa's secret protectors, are trying to protect him. As fate would have it, the plan to assassinate Mustafa is foiled, and instead Rumeysa is killed. Mustafa declares war on Hurrem. During the hunt, Suleiman, having learned about this from Rustem Pasha, falls into a rage. Cecilia's former maid, Valeria, goes behind her back and is assigned to Selim's harem instead of Cecilia. Cecilia decides to take a desperate step: the girl asks Hurrem for help. Hurrem accepts her request and gives her a new name - Nurbanu. Selim and his harem go to Manisa. Waking up in the morning, Hurrem finds a box on her bed. Deciding that this is a gift from the ruler, Hurrem opens the box and sees a living scorpion in it.
106	3	"Episode 106"	Mert Baykal & Yağız Alp Akaydın	Yılmaz Şahin	October 2, 2013	9.27
Suleiman's fourth sister, Fatma Sultan, arrives in Istanbul. She brings with her Hatice and Ibrahim's grown daughter: Huricihan. Suleiman tells Hurrem about a dream connected with Mustafa. Selim suffers a major setback in Manisa: while protecting the disguised prince, his guards kill a merchant. Huricihan falls in love with Bayezid. Fatma sends a concubine to her brother, but she never ends up in the Lord’s chambers. Mihrunnisa, daughter of Barbarossa, arrives to Mustafa in Amasya. Fatma tells Huricihan the true reason for their arrival at the palace. Nurbanu is trying with all her might to get into Selim’s chambers. Fatma finds out the real reason for Hurrem's ailments and decides to set a trap for her, but Hurrem does what no one expects from her - she sends a concubine, Valeria, to the Sultan.
107	4	"Episode 107"	Mert Baykal & Yağız Alp Akaydın	Yılmaz Şahin	October 9, 2013	8.96
At a reception with Ali Agha, Rustem is surrounded by Janissaries loyal to Mustafa. Fearing poisoning, Rustem starts a scandal. Huricihan and Fatma put their insidious plan into action. Selim, again remembering the incident at the market, drives Nurbanu away. Fatma breaks Huricihan's violin. Bayezid decides to help her and goes with her to the market for a new violin, where he almost runs into Sumbul. Huricihan kisses Bayezid, but then, frightened, runs away. Nurbanu moves to the room for favorites; however, she will have to live with Dilşah. Fatma promises Valeria her help and gives her a new name - Nazenin. Hurrem tries to reason with Bayezid, but he does not want to hear anything. Sumbul meets Dzhevher, a textile merchant, at the market. Mihrunnisa confesses her feelings to Mustafa. Bayezid leaves for Kutahya. Hurrem has to face her worst nightmare: Nazenin is pregnant with Suleiman's child.
108	5	"Episode 108"	Mert Baykal & Yağız Alp Akaydın	Yılmaz Şahin	October 23, 2013	8.81
Suleiman is excited about expecting another child, while Hurrem is very saddened by this fact. Selim gets into trouble again. Nurbanu tries to solve the problem, but this spoils her relationship with Selim. Bayezid is trying with all his might to expel Selim from Manisa. Mahidevran plans to separate Mustafa from Mihrunnisa. Suleiman learns about what happened in the Janissary garrison and makes a tough decision regarding his son-in-law Rustem - he sends Sadrazam into exile in Herzegovina. Mihrunnisa ends up in the hands of the people of Rustem Pasha, led by Zal Mahmud. To detain her husband in the capital, Mihrimah pretends to be sick.
109	6	"Episode 109"	Mert Baykal & Yağız Alp Akaydın	Yılmaz Şahin	October 30, 2013	8.56
Bayezid is going to leave his sanjak against the rules in order to find out what Selim did in Manisa. Threatening the life of Mihrunnisa, Hurrem forces Hayreddin Pasha Barbarossa to ask the Sultan for resignation. Hurrem decides to get rid of Nazenin and orders poison to be mixed into her medicine. Sokollu Mehmed Pasha discovers a very unpleasant fact from the past of Sheikh-ul-Islam and Fenerizade Efendi, and he leaves his post. Realizing that the opportunity to become a father again after many years is a great joy for Suleiman, Hurrem hurries to save Nazenin. Cihangir thinks that Huricihan is in love with him. Mustafa, without informing anyone, arrives in the capital and runs into his father at Barbarossa’s sick bed. Selim finds out that Nurbanu is pregnant.
110	7	"Episode 110"	Mert Baykal & Yağız Alp Akaydın	Yılmaz Şahin	November 6, 2013	9.17
The fortune teller predicts Hurrem that “there will be a new sehzade in the palace. And he will sit on the throne." Suleiman demands an answer from Mustafa. Bayezid decides to inform his father about Selim's affairs. Hurrem is convinced that Mustafa is plotting a coup. The Sultan decides to execute Ali Agha and Mustafa personally arrests him. In front of Sultan Ali-Aga's head is cut off, but before that he confesses his allegiance to Mustafa. Rustem returns to the capital. The morning after Fatma Sultan's wedding, Mustafa Pasha is found dead. Nurbanu makes an enemy in Dilşah. Suleiman appoints Ferhat Agha as the new commander-in-chief of the Janissary corps. The new head of the Janissaries invites Mustafa to carry out a coup. Cihangir and Dilşah go to Kutahya to see Bayezid. Nazenin goes into labor, which ruins Hürrem's plans. In Kütahya, Cihangir realizes that he was mistaken about Huricihan's feelings. Mustafa proposes to Mihrunnisa.
111	8	"Episode 111"	Mert Baykal & Yağız Alp Akaydın	Yılmaz Şahin	November 13, 2013	8.92
Nazenin gives birth to a daughter, Raziye. Suleiman refuses Barbarossa's resignation. However, soon the life of Kapudan Pasha is under threat. Hurrem burns Selim's letter, in which he informs his father about Bayezid's secret trip to Manisa. Nurbanu, who caught Selim with another concubine, becomes furious. She sets a condition for Selim: as long as she is there, he will not have other women. Bayezid, secretly from everyone, arrives in Istanbul to meet with Huricihan, but instead he first encounters the pasha’s mother, who had previously received a letter from Lala Mustafa, and then receives reproaches on his head from the Lord. Fatma is going to destroy the marriage of Rustem and Mihrimah. Matrakçi reports to the Sultan on the results of his mission to the Sanjaki Shehzade. Mustafa marries Mihrunnisa. Suleiman suspects that Matrakçi did not tell him everything about Mustafa’s affairs. Bayezid makes peace with his father. Having previously visited the terminally ill Kapudan Pasha in his house, Rustem Pasha informs the Lord about the death of Hayreddin Barbarossa.
112	9	"Episode 112"	Mert Baykal & Yağız Alp Akaydın	Yılmaz Şahin	November 20, 2013	9.02
All the sehzade come to the capital for Barbarossa’s funeral. Hurrem advises Mihrimah to improve relations with her husband. A conflict is brewing between Nurbanu and Nazenin. Bayezid and Cihangir become close to Mustafa, which angers Selim. Mihrimah, in order to reconcile the brothers, decides to arrange a dinner in his palace. Mehmed Sokollu receives the position of Kapudan Pasha, in contrast to Barbarossa's ally Turgut, Reis. Sumbul, having drunk a lot of wine, tells Cevher the secret of Hurrem. At dinner at Mihrimah's, Bayezid and Selim start a fight. Selim asks his father to remove him from the post of Sanjakbey of Manisa. Hurrem blames Mustafa for what happened to her sons. Fatma learns about Hurrem's secret room located in the building of the Divan Council. Atmaça, who received orders to get rid of Mihrunnisa, learns about her pregnancy.
113	10	"Episode 113"	Mert Baykal & Yağız Alp Akaydın	Yılmaz Şahin	November 27, 2013	9.37
By supporting Selim, Suleiman makes the gap between the brothers even wider. Sumbul understands that Cevher betrayed him. Suleiman learns about Hurrem's affairs. Atmaça decides to save Mihrunnisa's life. Sumbul, on the orders of Hurrem, kills Cevher. Mahidevran is going to hide her daughter-in-law’s condition. Huricihan decides to leave the capital. In the hammam, Nurbanu finds Selim with another concubine and causes a scandal, which ends with the beginning of labor. Nurbanu gives birth. Fatma informs Hurrem that Suleiman has left for Manisa with Nazenin.
114	11	"Episode 114"	Mert Baykal & Yağız Alp Akaydın	Yılmaz Şahin	December 4, 2013	9.71
Suleiman, having arrived to Selim, finds him drunk, and later scolds his son for this. He names Selim and Nurbanu's son Murad. Fatma tells Sokollu that he will soon take Rustem's place. Having gained freedom, Sumbul leaves the harem. In Amasya, Bayezid is reunited with Huricihan. Suleiman recalls the years spent in Manisa. After talking with the merchant's widow, the Sultan decides to forgive Selim. Bayezid decides to take Huricihan with him and marry her. Mustafa tells him about his marriage with Mihrunnisa and her pregnancy. On orders from Hurrem, Nurbanu sets up Nazenin to die in an accident. Having learned the news from Amasya, where, as it turned out, the local beys glorify Mustafa, Suleiman becomes furious. Mustafa receives from his father a caftan poisoned by the efforts of Zal Mahmud. Suleiman decides to send Hurrem into exile in Kutahya.
115	12	"Episode 115"	Mert Baykal & Yağız Alp Akaydın	Yılmaz Şahin	December 11, 2013	10.61
Cihangir sends Atmaça to help his brother Mustafa, but he is ambushed. Rustem is preparing for the arrival of the Persian sehzade Elkas Mirza. Meanwhile, Mustafa and his army approach the capital, where the Janissaries meet him. Hurrem's unexpected arrival in Kutahya ruins Bayezid's plans. The overlord orders Mustafa to be stopped by any means necessary and later gives an audience to his son. Under the influence of Mihrimah, Cihangir changes his testimony. Nurbanu tries to guide Selim on the true path. Relations between Hurrem and Bayezid deteriorate. Selim finds a woman on the side. Bayazid and Huricihan perform nikah. Mustafa sees his death in the eyes of his own father.
116	13	"Episode 116"	Mert Baykal & Yağız Alp Akaydın	Yılmaz Şahin	December 18, 2013	9.45
Hurrem returns to Istanbul and asks for forgiveness from the Sultan. Nurbanu finds out the truth about Eftalia. Taşlıcalı no longer trusts Atmaça, whom Mustafa had previously rescued from captivity. Mustafa learns that Piri Reis is behind his defenders. Hurrem orders Huricihan to immediately return to Beyhan Sultan in Skopje. Suleiman is preparing to go on a campaign against Iran and decides to leave Mustafa as governor in the capital. Mihrunnisa gives birth to a son. Mustafa names him Mehmed. Huricihan makes a deal with Hürrem. Rustem's jealousy drives Mihrimah to the decision to divorce. Suleiman learns from the report of Sehzade Bayezid's mentor Lala Mustafa Pasha about Mustafa's secret marriage.
117	14	"Episode 117"	Mert Baykal & Yağız Alp Akaydın	Yılmaz Şahin	December 25, 2013	9.17
Hürrem asks Mihrimah to postpone the divorce until the end of the campaign. Elkas confesses his love to Fatma. The disappointed Lord sends Mustafa a letter in which he says that he knows his secret and orders him to remain in his sanjak. Mahidevran suspects that Bayezid revealed Mustafa’s secret to his father. Mustafa is disappointed in his brother Bayezid. Hürrem threatens Fatma with violence if she does not leave her children behind. Lala Mustafa tells Bayezid about Huricihan's involvement in Mustafa's case. Rustem returns the Grand Vizier's seal to Suleiman and says that he does not need the position without Mihrimah. Under pressure from Nurbanu, Selim decides to kill Eftalia and her husband Dimitri. Mihrimah learns that the letters from Elkas were written by Fatma Sultan. As regent, Selim goes to Istanbul instead of Mustafa.
118	15	"Episode 118"	Mert Baykal & Yağız Alp Akaydın	Yılmaz Şahin	January 8, 2014	9.67
Suleiman is trying to hide his illness. Insulted by Selim, Cihangir asks his father to take him on a hike. The qadi's assistant finds Fatma with Elkas Mirza; Rustem comes to their aid. Hürrem, hoping that Cihangir will change his mind about going on a campaign, sends him a concubine, but the girl infuriates him. Suleiman agrees to the marriage of Fatma and Elkas Mirza. Having learned about this, Mihrimah orders Zal Mahmud Agha to kill Elkas on the campaign. Cihangir decides to stay in Istanbul, but Suleiman agrees to take him with him. Bayezid tells Huricihan that he will tell the Lord about everything. Sumbul is going to open a coffee shop. Selim shows his ambitions in the absence of his father. Rustem dissuades Bayezid from a rash act. Mustafa asks his father for forgiveness, but the gap between them is growing wider. The Lord forgives him, but warns him that this was the last time. Nurbanu tells Selim that the path to power lies through his mother. Atmaça, who had previously caught the Persian spy, informs Mustafa about the impending assassination attempt on the Lord.
119	16	"Episode 119"	Mert Baykal & Yağız Alp Akaydın	Yılmaz Şahin	January 15, 2014	8.57
Suleiman's disease is progressing. Piri Reis decides to remove Hurrem from Mustafa's path. Rustem gives instructions to Bayezid. The Persian assassination attempt on the Sultan in a military camp is thwarted thanks to Mustafa. However, Suleiman no longer believes his son. Hürrem tries to dissuade Mihrimah from divorce. The ruler reprimands Elkas Mirza for allowing traitors to come to him. Polish princess Anna Jagiellonka arrives in the capital. She asks Hurrem for help for her people. Her rapprochement with Selim worries Nurbanu. In Tabriz, Dervish makes a gloomy prediction to Suleiman. Hürrem learns about the promises Bayezid and Mustafa made to each other and decides to support Selim. On the streets of Istanbul, Yavuz tries to assassinate Hürrem, but Afife becomes the victim. Before her death, she manages to inform Hürrem about the Lord’s illness. In the military camp, in front of Bayezid, the sick Sultan makes a speech to the Janissaries, but immediately faints.
120	17	"Episode 120"	Mert Baykal & Yağız Alp Akaydın	Yılmaz Şahin	January 22, 2014	8.89
Suleiman, despite his state of health, decides to enter Istanbul on horseback. Rustem tells Hurrem that in the event of the death of the Sultan, Bayezid should ascend to the throne. Hurrem informs Suleiman about the death of Afife Hatun and the circumstances of what happened. Mihrimah tells Fatma what fate awaits Elkas. Hürrem informs the children about their father's condition. Suleiman, delirious, calls Mustafa, and Hürrem decides to call Sehzade to the capital. Rustem makes Mihrimah a tempting offer. On the way to the capital, an assassination attempt was made on Mustafa, the victim of which was Yavuz, disguised as a sehzade. The Janissaries, with the assistance of Piri Reis, are preparing for a rebellion. Suleiman gets better, and at this time Turgut Reis builds a fleet in front of the palace. Despite the doctor's prohibition, Suleiman is going to go to the Friday greeting at the Sehzade mosque, but upon leaving the chambers he loses consciousness. The Janissaries begin to suspect that the Sultan's death was hidden from them. In the hamam, the unconscious Suleiman is immersed in a bath with cold water and pieces of ice and he then sees his father Sultan Selim Yavuz again in a dream. Rustem decides to get rid of Selim. Nurbanu dissuades Selim from participating in Rustem's venture. Hurrem asks Mustafa for help. Selim's anger pushes him to the edge of the abyss.
121	18	"Episode 121"	Mert Baykal & Yağız Alp Akaydın	Yılmaz Şahin	January 29, 2014	9.11
Selim is saved in the Janissary garrison by Mustafa. The people in the capital glorify Mustafa while Suleiman is recovering. Selim accuses Mustafa of organizing what happened in the Janissary Corps. At the Sultan’s bedside, Hurrem thanks Mustafa for saving her son and admits to him that if he had been her son, then everything could have turned out differently. Selim tells Mihrimah that for the Janissaries, Mustafa has already become a sultan. Hürrem accuses Rustem of attacking Mustafa and Selim. Rustem tells her that their lives are now in Mustafa’s hands. Sumbul tells Hürrem about the conversations among the people. Rustem shows Mihrimah the poison that he and Hurrem Sultan carry in case Mustafa ascends to the throne. Mahidevran arrives in the capital. Mihrimah accuses Mustafa, his mother and Fatma Sultan of wanting the Lord to die. Many years later, Rustem meets his brother Andro, who now bears the name Sinan and is the governor of Herzegovina. Mustafa assures Mihrimah that if he ascends the throne, her brothers will not suffer. Suleiman gets out of bed, which makes Hurrem incredibly happy. Hürrem advises Mahidevran to start packing and return to Amasya together with Mustafa. Suleiman, together with his sons, visits the Janissaries in their corps, where he personally executes their leader with the sword of Mustafa. By order of the Lord, Lokman Aga buries in the ground the diary of Ibrahim Pasha, which was previously in the hands of Suleiman. 1553 – Hurrem decides, with the help of Rustem, to frame Mustafa, accusing him of friendship with Tahmasp. Rustem hints to the Lord about a new campaign against the Persians. Mihrimah offers his mother help in the fight against Mustafa. Suleiman is reported on the state of affairs on the Persian borders. While Atmaça reports to Mustafa about Rustem's tricks in the capital, Mihrimah, during a trip to Amasya, steals Mustafa's seal. At this time, Rustem writes a letter on behalf of Mustafa to Tahmasp.
122	19	"Episode 122"	Mert Baykal & Yağız Alp Akaydın	Yılmaz Şahin	February 5, 2014	8.72
Hürrem is preparing to celebrate her victory over Mustafa. The Janissaries are outraged by Rustem's command in the campaign against Persia. The chief astrologer tells Suleiman and Hürrem about the bad omen. Nurbanu in Manisa also predicts an eclipse. Bayazid tells Lala that if he had everything that Mustafa has, he would not be so patient. Huricihan is trying with all her might to get pregnant. They are going to marry Fatma to Kara Ahmed Pasha. Cihangir visits Mihrimah and asks her about what is happening. He says that if something happens to Mustafa, he will consider his sister, mother and Rustem guilty. Fahriye is appointed to replace Afife. Selim is concerned about the prospect of becoming regent of the sultanate for the duration of the campaign. Kara Ahmed Pasha joins the supporters of Mustafa. The death of Tufan Agha infuriates the Janissaries. Rustem reports to Suleiman that the Janissaries are preparing a rebellion. Kara Ahmed reports to the Sultan about the visit to the council of Mustafa's supporters. Suleiman appoints Piri Reis as captain of the Indian Ocean. Mutual sympathy arises between Kara Ahmed and Fatma. Cihangir demands an explanation from his mother, but she drives him away. Rustem's men, led by Zal Mahmud, intercept Tahmasp's letter. Rumelia's Kazaasker tells Atmaça about Ahmed Pasha's betrayal. In front of Hürrem, Sokollu gives the Lord the letter obtained by Zal Mahmud Agha. Mustafa and his son Mehmed go hunting, where the little sehzade disappears. Having happily returned to the palace with his son rescued from the swamp, Mustafa learns about the letter. Suleiman receives a written response from Ebusuud, which states that Mustafa is “allowed to be killed.”
123	20	"Episode 123"	Mert Baykal & Yağız Alp Akaydın	Yılmaz Şahin	February 12, 2014	11.56
Mustafa receives a call to a military camp from his father. Selim also goes there. Bayezid remains in the capital, who is very surprised by his father’s decision. Mahidevran tries to open her son’s eyes to what is happening, but he refuses to listen to her because he believes that his father will not harm him. Atmaça and Taşlıcalı are going to enthrone Mustafa. Cihangir asks his father to take him on a hike. Mahidevran reminds her son about the fate of Ibrahim Pasha. Rustem Pasha is preparing for the upcoming clash with Mustafa. Atmaça is preparing a rebellion of the Janissaries in a military camp. Fatma asks her husband to protect Mustafa. Suleiman takes the executioners with him to the camp. Mihrimah begins to regret what he did. Hurrem tells her that if Mustafa is not executed, then the bodies of her brothers and father will return from the military camp. Suleiman learns of Mustafa's arrival at the camp. Kara Ahmed, using an arrow shot from a bow, secretly gives Mustafa a warning note. Cihangir secretly makes his way to Mustafa's tent and informs him of the Lord's decision. Mustafa leaves Cihangir a parting gift. Hürrem understands that the Lord's heart has hardened. Suleiman sends Selim and Cihangir on a hunt. Mustafa goes to the camp, but his way is blocked by Janissaries loyal to Sehzade. Hussein Chavush begs him to go back, but Mustafa orders them to clear the way. Loyal to their sehzade, the Janissaries obey. By order of the Agha of the Janissary Corps, Semiza Ali, the instigators of the riot are killed in front of Hikmet Agha. Cihangir, sensing something was wrong, is about to return to camp, but Selim stops him. The Janissaries greet Mustafa, which angers the Lord even more. Atmaça realizes that they have been betrayed. He goes to Taşlıcalı, but on the way he is wounded by an arrow. Cihangir finds no place for himself while hunting. He understands that his father will not fulfill his promise. A dead dove falls on Mahidevran's balcony. Warriors loyal to the Sultan block the entrance to the tent when the unarmed Mustafa enters. Suleiman refuses to listen to his son and sits on his throne. The executioners attack the sehzade, but he is not going to give up. Mustafa is eventually killed by Zal Mahmud Agha. With his dead son in his arms, Suleiman realizes the gravity of his act.
124	21	"Episode 124"	Mert Baykal & Yağız Alp Akaydın	Yılmaz Şahin	February 19, 2014	13.85
The executioners take Mustafa's body out of the Lord's tent. The shocked Janissaries, led by Hussein Cavus, beat their chests. The Lord reads in tears Mustafa's letter, which had previously appeared in his hands. Cihangir accuses his father of lying and killing an innocent person. Due to the unrest of the Janissaries, during which the traitor Hikmet dies, Rustem, removed from his post, is forced to flee the camp to Istanbul. Kara Ahmed Pasha is appointed Grand Vizier. Taşlıcalı brings the news of Sehzade's execution to the Amasya palace. He also delivers Mahidevran the Sultan’s order to go with the harem to Bursa. Mihrimah spreads the news of his brother's death throughout the palace. Fatma, Bayezid and Gulfem blame Rustem and Hurrem for the death of Mustafa. Unrest is brewing in the capital: the Janissaries plan to overthrow the Sultan and place Mustafa's son Mehmed on the throne. Mihrimah admits to her husband that she did not believe that her father could execute her brother. On the way from Amasya, Mahidevran and his family see crowds of people chanting: “Long live Sehzade Mehmed!” Nurbanu receives a letter from Selim, in which he writes that he has become one step closer to the throne, but cannot understand whether he is happy. Nurbanu admits that she feels sorry for Mustafa. Hürrem informs Suleiman about the impending rebellion. At Mustafa's funeral, Mahidevran accuses Bayezid of her son's death. One of the Janissaries in Sumbul's shop recognizes Hurrem's servant; Sumbul is beaten and his coffee shop is destroyed. Mihrunnisa suspects that they want to execute her son. Selim tells his father about Cihangir's condition. Hurrem secretly arrives at her daughter's palace with the intention of taking her with her husband and daughter to Topkapi, but the kapudan, Pasha Sinan, dissuades her. Mahidevran moves to Gemlik with her son’s harem, by order of the ruler. Cihangir is found in the forest in an inadequate condition. He again blames his father and says that with Mustafa's death, his father also died. Under the pretext of a breakdown, Mahidevran's carriage stops, while the carriage with Mehmed continues on its way. Mihrunnisa understands what really happened. Hadim Ibrahim Pasha tells Mehmed that he will no longer be able to see his mother. Hurrem secretly mourns Mustafa.
125	22	"Episode 125"	Mert Baykal & Yağız Alp Akaydın	Yılmaz Şahin	February 26, 2014	12.85
Neither the doctors nor the Sultan himself can cope with Cihangir’s illness. Selim asks his father to write to his mother about his brother’s condition, but he is sure that Cihangir will recover and refuses. Atmaça arrives in the capital to take revenge on Rustem for the death of Sehzade. Rustem gets closer to his brother. Cihangir is getting worse. Fahriye informs Hurrem that a crowd of armed people is moving towards the palace in Uskudar. Rustem, his wife and daughter, are trying to quickly leave the palace. One of the servants lets the rebels in. Having escaped from the palace, Rustem and his family find themselves trapped. Bayezid comes to their aid. Mihrimah blames Rustem for what is happening. Atmaça remembers Mustafa's request to swear allegiance to Bayezid. Rioters gather in front of Topkapi. The sick Cihangir asks Selim to take him to the capital. Bayezid goes out to the rioters and demands to stop the riot. The rioters leave the palace without complaint. Selim begs his father to fulfill his brother's request, but he refuses. Cihangir gets better and goes to his father. There is a clash between Hurrem and Fatma in the harem. While walking in the forest, Suleiman realizes that his son is not himself. He decides to send him and Selim home. Hürrem receives a letter from Selim and she decides to go to the camp. Bayezid is going to go with her. Cihangir gives Mustafa's farewell gift to his father and dies after drinking opium. Rustem is brought a casket from his brother, which contains Sinan’s hand, severed by Atmaça, and a note. Mihrimah dissuades her husband from meeting with enemies. The wounded Sinan comes to Rustem. On the way, Bayazid and his mother meet Selim, who is carrying the coffin with his brother’s body to the capital. At this, Hürrem faints.
126	23	"Episode 126"	Mert Baykal & Yağız Alp Akaydın	Yılmaz Şahin	March 5, 2014	11.42
Hürrem cannot recover from the death of her son. Nurbanu arrives in the capital to support her husband. Bayezid believes that in addition to his mother and Rustem, Huricihan is also guilty of Mustafa’s death. Rustem takes care of his brother, but he refuses to believe him and rejects help. Gazanfer Agha intercepts Bayezid's letter to Huricihan and passes it to Nurbanu. Mihrimah tries to bring her mother back to life. Mahidevran and Mihrunnisa arrive in Istanbul to transport Mihrunnisa to Algeria to her brother. In the presence of Hürrem and Mahidevran, Mihrunnisa cuts her own throat in front of the entire harem. In Amasya, Suleyman meets with Taşlıcalı. Kara Ahmed tells Bayazid about the false Mustafa who rebelled against the Sultan. Fatma and her husband decide to support Selim in the fight for the throne. Huricihan comes to the capital, but Bayezid is not happy with her. They find out that the letter inviting them to Istanbul was forged. Mahidevran with fists and curses rushes at Hürrem. On the advice of Fatma, Mahidevran hastily leaves for Bursa. Before leaving, Fatma gives her money to build Mustafa's tomb. Rumors about the nikkah of Bayezid and Huricihan quickly spread in the palace. Huricihan blames Nurbanu for everything. Bayezid blames his brother for everything. In front of the Grand Vizier, Atmaça, who attempted to get rid of Rustem in his house, kills Sinan Pasha with his ax.
127	24	"Episode 127"	Mert Baykal & Yağız Alp Akaydın	Yılmaz Şahin	March 12, 2014	10.02
Hürrem tries to reconcile her sons, but the enmity becomes stronger. Hurrem blames Nurbanu for this and tells her that if she doesn’t stop, she will go to conquer the waters of the Bosphorus in a sack. Rustem demands that Hurrem choose one of her sons. Bayezid goes to Rumelia to suppress the uprising of the false Mustafa. Gazanfer advises Nurbanu to make peace with Huricihan. Gulfem advises Huricihan to bring Hurrem and Mihrimah to her side. Canfeda suspects Gazanfer of forbidden feelings for Nurbanu. Atmaça tells Bayezid about Mustafa's last request and swears allegiance to him. Selim, with the support of the Grand Vizier, assists the false Mustafa on behalf of Bayezid. Kara Ahmed and Sokollu turn the Lord against Bayezid. Huricihan goes to the Lord to tell about the nikah, but Suleiman interrupts her and says that he has known about it for a long time. Bayezid decides to go to the false Mustafa together with Atmaça. At night, in Cihangir’s chambers, Suleiman encounters Hurrem. Mihrimah asks her father not to deprive Rustem of his favor. Sokollu captures the false Mustafa and brings him to Istanbul. Hurrem begs Rustem to save Bayezid. Suleiman visits Raziye's grave and encounters the enmity of Yahya Efendi. Yahya asks the Sultan to take care of Mahidevran. Bayezid refuses to return to Istanbul for fear that his father will execute him too. In Edirne, Rustem attacks Atmaça, but he is forced to unite with his enemy for the sake of the future Bayezid. Bayezid goes to the Sultan; Selim is also called there. The ruler says that he is sure that Selim should ascend to the throne after him. Bayezid becomes furious and, in front of Rustem, declares war on his father and brother.
128	25	"Episode 128"	Mert Baykal & Yağız Alp Akaydın	Yılmaz Şahin	March 19, 2014	9.50
Hurrem, wanting to save the lives of both sons, writes a letter in which he asks the Sultan to come to his senses. Nurbanu tells Selim that she will do anything to ensure that he ascends the throne. Bayezid is confident that Selim is behind the accusations of the uprising of the false Mustafa. Sokollu reports to Suleiman that it was Mahidevran who provided financial assistance to the rebels, and the Sultan, contrary to the request of his foster brother, deprives Mahidevran of all payments. Kara Ahmed enters into a confrontation with Hürrem. Bayezid is trying to find out who framed him, but the messenger who was delivering the money to the false Mustafa is killed. The war between Hurrem and Fatma is gaining momentum. Mihrimah, opposed to Selim, demands that her mother choose Bayezid. Kara Ahmed is accused of embezzling gold from the treasury and sending it to the rebels. Suleiman communicates in his chambers with the children of Selim and Bayezid. The idyll is disrupted by Selim, who wishes to hold Murad’s circumcision ceremony in the capital. Suleiman removes Kara Ahmed Pasha from office and then the executioners kill the Sultan's son-in-law by strangulation. Rustem becomes Grand Vizier again. During the celebration of Murad's circumcision, Huricihan finds Nurbanu with Gazanfer Agha. Nurbanu tries to explain to her what really happened, but she says that no one will believe her. A fight breaks out between them, from which Nurbanu emerges victorious.
129	26	"Episode 129"	Mert Baykal & Yağız Alp Akaydın	Yılmaz Şahin	March 26, 2014	9.95
The wounded Huricihan comes to the harem and falls unconscious. Nurbanu discovers that her earring is missing. Suleiman orders an investigation to be launched and the culprit to be punished. Chavush arrives in Bursa to give Mahidevran an order to deprive her of her income and inform her that Nergissah will be married off. Selim notices signs of a fight on Nurbanu's body. Hürrem calls Nurbanu to her and shows a pair of earrings, one of which was found in Selim’s chambers, and the other in the corridor where Huricihan was hit. Hürrem orders Nurbanu and Canfeda to be thrown into prison, but Nurbanu avoids punishment with threats. Huricihan comes to her senses, but dies without saying a word. Bayezid's concubine Rana Sultan is accused of murdering Huricihan. Bayazid goes to interrogate her, but finds her already dead in the room. Hurrem, at the suggestion of Rustem and Mihrimah, decides to send Lala Mustafa with Selim to Manisa. In addition, with the permission of the ruler, Fahriye also goes to Manisa, and Lokman Agha goes with Bayezid. Bayezid and Atmaça send Mahidevran money to build Mustafa's tomb, but she rejects it. In Manisa, Fahriye is about to send Dilşah to Selim's halvet, but Nurbanu intercepts them and sends Dilşah back to the workshop. New girls from the capital are brought to Bayezid's palace, among whom is Defne, sent by Nurbanu. Suleiman, having heard the speeches of people in the market, asks his wife whether she had a hand in the death of Mustafa. On Fahriye's advice, Dilșah decides to get rid of the annoying Venetian woman and drowns her in the bathroom.
130	27	"Episode 130"	Mert Baykal & Yağız Alp Akaydın	Yılmaz Şahin	April 2, 2014	9.90
Nurbanu is saved from death by the faithful Canfeda and Gazanfer, who accidentally kills Dilșah. A secret correspondence begins between Defne and Bayazid. Nurbanu blames Fahriye and Hurrem for the attack. Mihrimah discovers a rash on her body that no doctor can cure. Fatma proposes Melek for the harem position, but Hürrem nominates Gulfem, who is chosen by the Lord. Nurbanu declares war on Hurrem. Sokollu offers Rustem the help of the Spanish doctor Pedro, who serves him. Nurbanu begs Selim to leave Gazanfer in the palace or expel Fahriye, but he refuses her. Nurbanu offers Gazanfer a way out - castration. Selim personally meets Joseph Nasi. Bayezid returns Defne's feelings. Fatma incites people to attack Hurrem. Hurrem goes to the sick fortune teller and she reports that Mihrimah’s disease is curable, and Hurrem herself will soon die and the death of one of her sons. The fortune teller's house is surrounded by an angry crowd armed with sticks and stones. Suleiman goes to his wife’s rescue. Despite Sumbul's admonitions, Hurrem decides to go out to the crowd, and the crowd, subdued, makes way for her. However, one of the rebels decides to attack, but Suleiman, who arrives in time, kills him with his dagger. Fatma, who was expecting news of Hurrem's death, meets her in the palace. Nurbanu tells Selim the news from Kutahya. Suleiman outlaws coffee. Melek betrays Fatma to Hürrem, and she tells everything to the Sultan. Suleiman orders Fatma to leave the palace. Bayezid finds Selim's people who stole gold, which was being transported from Istanbul to pay off the debts of Sehzade. Fatma leaves the capital. Suleiman goes to Edirne to put an end to the memories that haunt him.
131	28	"Episode 131"	Mert Baykal & Yağız Alp Akaydın	Yılmaz Şahin	April 9, 2014	9.58
Waking up at night, Hürrem discovers a strange wound on her shoulder. Selim receives from his brother a chest with a robber's head and an angry letter. Nurbanu advises Sehzade to get rid of his opponent. Hürrem meets with the fortune teller again, and she repeats her prophecy. In Edirne, Suleiman meets the Jewish merchant Grazia Mendes and takes her under his protection. Hürrem decides to hide her illness and go to Edirne. Seeing that Selim does not intend to fight with his brother, Nurbanu decides to take a desperate step. At the instigation of Nurbanu, Selim sends an order to Defne to poison Bayezid. The interrupted treatment negatively affects Mihrimah's health, and she decides to turn to Pedro without her husband's knowledge. With tears in her eyes, Defne pours poison into Bayezid's food, but Sehzade is saved by Atmaça. Having received news from Manisa, Hürrem goes to her son. Defne betrays Nurbanu to Atmaça and admits that she is expecting a child from Sehzade. Mihrimah finds out the cause of her illness, but decides to continue meeting with Pedro at all costs. Bayezid and his army approach Manisa. On the way, Hürrem becomes ill, and the doctor says that the Sultana’s illness is fatal.
132	29	"Episode 132"	Mert Baykal & Yağız Alp Akaydın	Yılmaz Şahin	April 16, 2014	9.25
Having arrived at Manisa, Hürrem manages to stop the fratricide and falls unconscious. On the advice of Sumbul, the doctor hides the true cause of the Sultana’s fainting, attributing everything to fatigue. Selim learns that Nurbanu, contrary to his orders, tried to poison Bayezid. Gracia becomes close to Sokollu, which displeases Rustem. Hürrem is determined to execute Nurbanu, but Selim stands up for her. Sokollu intercepts Bayezid's letter to the Overlord. Mihrimah becomes close to Pedro, and Sokollu decides to give the doctor to the sultana. Rustem becomes furious at this news and is about to kill Pedro, but Mihrimah grants Pedro freedom and saves his life. Lala Mustafa finds out that Hurrem is terminally ill and goes over to Selim's side. Hurrem reconciles her sons. Bayezid takes Defne's sister Anna with him to the sanjak. Gracia illegally brings Jews to Istanbul. The Sultan finds out about this, but after listening to Gracia’s arguments, he decides to leave the people in the capital. Selim still cannot forgive Nurbanu and decides to send her and her son to the Aydin sanjak. Sumbul tells the Sultan about Hurrem's fatal illness.
133	30	"Episode 133"	Mert Baykal & Yağız Alp Akaydın	Yılmaz Şahin	April 23, 2014	9.07
Hürrem drives Sumbul out of the palace. Suleiman convenes doctors in the hope of ridding Hürrem of her illness. Lala, under the leadership of Selim, writes a complaint against Bayezid to the Sultan, but sends it to Bayezid himself. Ayşe Sultan demands her father to return Defne to her. Pedro invites Mihrimah to leave with him, but she refuses. Rustem finds them at the port. Mihrimah asks her husband to let Pedro go home. Selim misses Nurbanu. Rustem gets close to Gracia to make his wife jealous. Hürrem asks her husband to send away the doctors and leave her alone. Bayezid challenges his brother to a duel. Hürrem asks for forgiveness from Gulfem. She and Suleiman go to Bursa for treatment. The Sultan receives reproaches on his head from Mahidevran, and then visits his son’s grave. Hürrem asks Mahidevran for forgiveness and blessings. On a forest road there is a clash between Selim and his brother. During the duel, at the last moment, Bayezid decides to save the life of his defeated and wounded brother. Hürrem asks her husband to call her relatives to the capital to say goodbye.
134	31	"Episode 134"	Mert Baykal & Yağız Alp Akaydın	Yılmaz Şahin	April 30, 2014	9.70
Suleiman and Hurrem return to Istanbul. In the harem, Hürrem meets Sumbul, who asks her for forgiveness, but Hürrem herself apologizes to him. Suleiman tells his daughter about Hurrem’s illness and asks her to please her mother before her death. News of his mother's illness reaches Selim. Nurbanu returns to Manisa without permission. Defne gives birth to a son, but he is very weak. Hürrem asks Sumbul to find Ibrahim's grave. Hatice Kalfa tells Mihrimah about her suspicions about Rustem and Gracia. Suleiman urges Sinan to build the Suleymaniye Mosque. Despite Fahriye's persuasion, Selim decides to leave Nurbanu in Manisa. Mihrimah finds out about her pregnancy. Defne prepares for execution, but Bayezid forgives her. Suleiman, at the request of Hurrem, decides to build the Cihangir Mosque. Hurrem gives Fahriye the order to get rid of Nurbanu. Suleiman and his family go to the opening of the mosque. Hürrem asks her husband to bury her here. Hurrem's death is near. Tables are set in the garden, around which the whole Sultan's family gathers. Hürrem gives her last instructions to her children and says goodbye to her family. She gets worse, and in the harem the sultana falls into the arms of the sultan, as in their first meeting. Suleiman remains with Hurrem until her last breath. Hurrem Sultan dies in Suleiman's personal chambers.
135	32	"Episode 135"	Mert Baykal & Yağız Alp Akaydın	Yılmaz Şahin	May 7, 2014	9.00
The palace is plunged into sorrow. Hurrem is buried in Sulaymaniye. After the burial, Sumbul remembers that Hurrem did not have a ring. Having learned that the last person who was with the sultana was Canfeda, Sumbul calls her for questioning, but they are interrupted by Nurbanu. Selim and Bayezid receive a farewell gift from their mother. The Sultan orders that jewelry and silks be removed from his room, and also orders Gulfem to hire dumb servants. Fun and celebrations are now also prohibited in the harem. A wall appears between Mihrimah and Rustem in the form of Gracia, and Mihrimah decides to move to the Sultan’s palace. The confrontation between the brothers is gaining momentum. Nurbanu learns from a fortune teller that the next sultan will be the son of a Venetian woman. Her joy is overshadowed by the fact that Defne is also Venetian. Defne asks Bayezid to be careful and remember about the children. Mihrimah gives birth to a son, whom the Sultan names Osman. The news of the birth of his son finds Rustem in Gracia's house. On Sumbul’s advice, Mihrimah leaves a warning in Gracia’s room. Selim shows his father Bayezid's message and the chest. Suleiman demands an explanation. Bayezid tells his version of what happened and calls Lala Mustafa as a witness, but he is already on Selim’s side. Mihrimah tries to protect her brother, but all is in vain. Rustem falls into a trap set by Selim and Sokollu. To avoid punishment for treason, Rustem goes over to Selim's side. Suleiman decides to send Selim to Konya and Bayezid to Amasya.
136	33	"Episode 136"	Mert Baykal & Yağız Alp Akaydın	Yılmaz Şahin	May 21, 2014	7.59
From Selim's letter, Suleiman learns about Bayezid's rebellion. Fahriye finds Hurrem's ring in Nurbanu's chambers. She tells everything to Selim, but he, defending Nurbanu, orders Fahriye to be thrown into prison. Suleiman sends letters to his sehzade, in which he warns them for the last time. Bayezid gathers the beylerbeys, who were once loyal to Mustafa, for war with his brother. Mihrimah goes to Kutahya to dissuade Bayezid from rash actions. Fahriye manages to get out of prison. She attacks Nurbanu, but she kills Fahriye with a knife at the last moment. Rustem Pasha learns about the betrayal of Gracia Mendes. Bayezid goes to Amasya and continues to gather an army. Suleiman asks Ebusuud Efendi for advice regarding Bayezid and receives the answer that Bayezid should be executed. Suleiman sends his army led by Sokollu to suppress the uprising. Selim learns about the offensive and advances with his army. The brothers meet face to face on the battlefield.
137	34	"Episode 137"	Mert Baykal & Yağız Alp Akaydın	Yılmaz Şahin	May 28, 2014	8.72
Year 1559, On the plain near the city of Konya, a battle unfolds between the armed armies of Sehzade, shortly before which Bayezid sees that Sokollu Pasha and the beys of Anatolia supported Selim. Shehzade Bayezid himself, seeing the resistance of the Janissaries loyal to Shehzade Selim, enters the battle and even tries to break through to his brother. During the battle, Sehzade Murad shoots an arrow at his uncle Bayezid. Atmaça pulls Shehzade out of the battle and takes him to Amasya. Sokollu reports what happened to Suleiman. Having learned about Rustem's betrayal, Mihrimah decides to divorce him, but the Lord forbids her to do this. Bayazid gets to his feet and writes letters to the Lord, but they are intercepted and delivered to the hands of Lal Mustafa Pasha. Through Mihrimah, the letter still reaches the Sultan, and he promises to forgive his son if he repents. However, the padishah had previously ordered Mehmed Sokoll to unite with Selim in order to finish off Bayezid’s rebellion and deliver the shehzade to him, alive or dead. Bayezid decides to flee Amasya with his four sons; He leaves his daughters, youngest son and Defne under the supervision of Lokman Agha. Suleiman's illness worsens. Pursued by Selim, Bayezid leaves Erzurum, where he had previously found refuge with the governor of Ayaz Pasha, and reaches the Persian border, where he is met by the messenger Tahmaspa. Sehzade Selim arrives in Erzurum and kills Ayaz Pasha. In Qazvin, the Shah of Persia, Tahmasp, takes Bayezid under his protection and offers to overthrow Suleiman, but Shehzadeh refuses. Bayezid decides to fulfill Atmaça's long-standing request regarding the Grand Vizier and sends him to Istanbul. Mihrimah, with the help of Atmaça, finds a solution to his problem. Defne learns that Tahmasp is negotiating with Suleiman about the extradition of Bayezid, and decides to go to Qazvin to help his beloved. Atmaça wounds the Hall of Mahmud and, having reached Rustem's chambers, Atmaça kills the Grand Vizier, but dies himself. Mihrimah gives the order to cleanse the palace, throwing the dead guards into the sea, to bury Atmaça with all honors, and to pass off Rustem’s death as death from dropsy. In Qazvin, Lala Mustafa invites Tahmasp to hand over Bayezid to him in exchange for the favor of the future.
138	35	"Episode 138"	Mert Baykal & Yağız Alp Akaydın	Yılmaz Şahin	June 4, 2014	8.61
Mihrimah again tries to persuade his father to save Bayezid’s life. To ransom his brother from Tahmasp, Selim takes money from Grazia Mendes. Bayezid, realizing that Tahmasp will sell him, is going to flee. A member of the Divan Council, Semiz Ali Pasha, is appointed Grand Vizier. The Ottoman ambassador Hüsrev Pasha brings Bayezid the Sultan's order to return home, but Bayezid refuses and sends a letter to his father. Mihrimah regrets that power has left her hands and tries to establish a relationship with the new grand vizier. Nurbanu is preparing to marry off his daughters and sends a message to Sokoll, in which he orders the death of Defne’s son. Bayezid is going to kill Tahmasp, but his army turns out to be dead. He decides to flee, but the Shah's guards bring him back. Gulfem, who is caring for the Sultan, tries to talk to him about Bayezid. At dinner, Bayezid attacks Tahmasp. His entire retinue is killed, and Shehzade himself and his sons are thrown into prison. Tahmasp demands a double ransom from the Sultan for Bayezid. In Amasya, Defne discovers that Sehzade Mehmed has been taken to the Sultan. The Sultan is angry at Tahmasp's impudence. Selim ransoms his brother and nephews and orders them to be taken to the capital. On the road in the forest, Selim, accompanied by Lala Mustafa, meets his brother's carriage and says that he will really take him to his father if he asks for mercy. In response, Bayezid insults Selim. While reading “The Prince” by N. Machiavelli, a vision appears before Suleiman in the form of the execution of Bayazid and then the Sultan faints on the palace balcony. Selim has Bayezid and his sons executed.
139	36	"Episode 139"	Mert Baykal & Yağız Alp Akaydın	Yılmaz Şahin	June 11, 2014	9.50
In 1566, Suleiman is declining. Nurbanu's daughters, already married, arrive in the capital. Nurbanu is closer than ever to unlimited power. Suleiman refuses treatment. Mahidevran has a dream about the Sultan and she understands that he will soon die. Sumbul asks the keeper of the chambers how Gulfem died, but he is hesitant to remember what happened. Selim visits his sister, but hears from her only an accusation of murdering his brother. He does not remain in debt and reminds her of her participation in Mustafa’s case. Murad arrives in the capital along with his favorite concubine Safiye, revealed to be a gift from Mihrimah as revenge for Nurbanu making Defne kill herself and her son. Mihrimah turns Murad against his father, saying that the drunken Selim is not the best future of the country. Murad goes to the Council of the Divan, where he presents the Lord with a gift in the form of a map of the Ottoman Empire and wins the favor of his grandfather. Suleiman, having met his only remaining son in a drunken state, orders the closure of drinking establishments. Suleiman secretly goes to the market and hears unflattering reviews about himself. Upset over Mihrimah's influence on Murad, Nurbanu intends to distance Safiye from her son, even though Safiye is pregnant. In the palace garden, Mihrimah encounters Mahidevran, who says that Selim promised to restore her status and wealth when he becomes sultan. Suleiman decides to go on a campaign against Hungary, already knowing that he will not return. Walking through the palace, he remembers the past. On the way, Suleiman becomes ill and is forced to take opium, from which Cihangir died. Mihrimah, recognizing the victory of Selim and Nurbanu, leaves for Edirne. In the military camp, the Sultan, who had previously given an audience to the Prince of Transylvania, Janos Sigismund Zapolyai, and who besieged Szigetvár, executes Arslan Khan. Sumbul takes Hurrem's diary and leaves the palace. Suleiman, who drank opium, gives a speech to the Janissaries, but in the tent he becomes ill. The Szigetvar fortress is taken by the Turks and at the same time, Suleiman dies. Selim receives the news from Sadrazam Mehmed Sokollu about the death of his father, and becomes the new Sultan. The ghost of Suleiman watches the battlefield one last time before departing forever.
