= Pargalı Ibrahim Pasha =

Grand Vizier of the Ottoman Empire from 1523 to 1536

Ibrahim Pasha
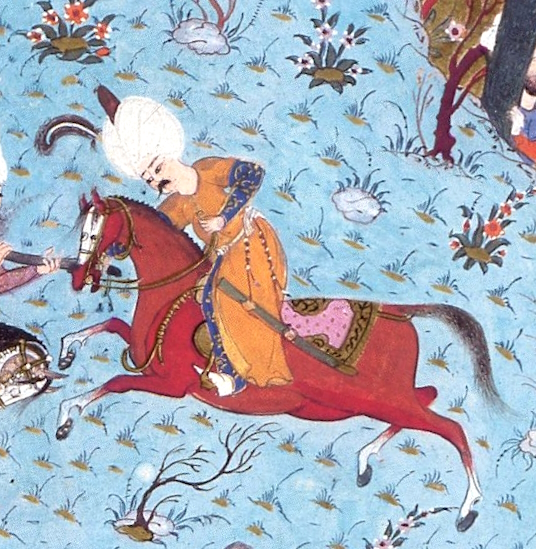
- Ibrahim Pasha (detail) suppresses the Kalender Çelebi rebellion in 1527, Süleymanname, 1558

Grand Vizier of the Ottoman Empire
- In office 27 June 1523 – 15 March 1536
- Monarch: Suleiman I
- Preceded by: Piri Mehmed Pasha
- Succeeded by: Ayas Mehmed Pasha

Ottoman Governor of Egypt
- In office 1525–1525
- Monarch: Suleiman I
- Preceded by: Güzelce Kasım Pasha
- Succeeded by: Güzelce Kasım Pasha

Personal details
- Born: c. 1495 Parga, Republic of Venice
- Died: 15 March 1536 (aged 40–41) Constantinople, Ottoman Empire
- Spouse: Muhsine Hatun (m. 1523)
- Children: Mehmed Şah Bey
- Parent: Yunus Bey

Pargalı Ibrahim Pasha (Note: also known as Frenk Ibrahim Pasha ("the Westerner"), Makbul Ibrahim Pasha ("the Favorite"), which later changed to Maktul Ibrahim Pasha ("the Executed") after his execution in the Topkapı Palace.) (c. 1495, Parga – 15 March 1536, Constantinople (Note: The official name of the city now known as Istanbul during the Ottoman Empire was "Kostantiniyye". For this reason, Constantinople is used throughout the article.)) was an Ottoman statesman who served as grand vizier from 1523 to 1536 during the reign of Suleiman I, and played a role in important political and military events. Because of the authority he wielded, he is regarded as the brains behind the Ottoman Empire's foreign policy.

Although his ethnic origin is not known with certainty, various sources have described him as being of Greek, Italian, Albanian, or Croatian origin. His father is believed to have been a sailor or fisherman living in Parga. Brought to Manisa at a young age through the devşirme system, Ibrahim was taken into the service of Prince Suleiman there and remained at his side until his death. He participated in the Belgrade campaign in 1521 and the Rhodes campaign in 1522. Rising rapidly during the early years of Suleiman's reign, he first became chief of the imperial chamber, and was later unexpectedly appointed grand vizier. In addition, he held the offices of beylerbey of Rumelia and Anatolia, as well as that of serasker.

Shortly after marrying in a lavish wedding in 1524, he was sent to Egypt, where he was tasked with restoring order following the rebellion of Hain Ahmed Pasha. While traveling to Egypt by land, he listened to the complaints of the population at many points along the route and resolved them, and introduced numerous reforms in Egypt. He played a major role in the Ottoman victory at the Battle of Mohács in Hungary in 1526. He participated in the First Siege of Vienna in 1529 and conducted the negotiations for the Treaty of Constantinople, signed with Austria in 1533, which placed the Austrian archduke on an equal footing with the Ottoman grand vizier. As commander of the Ottoman army during the Irakeyn campaign against the Safavids, he captured the Iranian city of Tabriz in August 1534. In 1536, Ibrahim Pasha, who had been invited to the palace for iftar on the evening bridging 14 and 15 March, was strangled to death during the night in his chamber at the palace by four deaf-mute executioners on the orders of Sultan Suleiman.

Ibrahim Pasha was Sultan Suleiman's chief adviser and closest confidant. In addition to Turkish, he was fluent in Persian, Greek, Serbian, and Italian. He had a strong interest in the arts and had received intensive musical training since childhood. In addition, during his 13-year tenure as grand vizier, he commissioned the construction of numerous mosques, madrasas, baths, and fountains. As a statesman who attained an extraordinary degree of fame and prestige for his time and played decisive roles in the development of the period's foreign political events, Pargalı Ibrahim Pasha is regarded by modern historians as one of the most important and successful Ottoman grand viziers.

== Origins and devşirme ==
There is no detailed information about the early years of Ibrahim Pasha, who was known by titles such as "Pargalı", "Frenk", "Makbul", and "Maktul". (Note: Attributed to numerous sources:) There is also differing information concerning his ethnic origin. Older Ottoman sources state that he was Efrenci (Frenk). Later sources state that his father was an Italian fisherman from Genoa who had settled in Parga. Apart from these, he has also been claimed to have been Greek or Croat. Evliya Çelebi, meanwhile, stated that his family originated from Razgrad, and that for this reason Ibrahim had commissioned the magnificent Ibrahim Pasha Mosque and Kurşunlu Han there. Some sources state that Ibrahim spoke a Slavic dialect and that, during peace negotiations with the Habsburgs in 1533, he conversed in his native language with the Croatian envoy Jerome of the Holy Roman Emperor Ferdinand I. (Note: The diplomatic delegation had been ordered to speak only German and therefore did not wish to speak in another language. Since Ibrahim Pasha's interpreter knew only Italian, the envoys requested an interpreter who knew only Croatian. One of the envoys addressed Ibrahim Pasha in Croatian, the language of his childhood, and asked that they be granted an audience with the sultan.) Gelibolulu Mustafa Ali's Künhü'l-Ahbâr and Osmanzâde Ahmed Tâib's Hadîkatü'l-vüzerâ both state that he was a Frenk. Hadîkatü'l-vüzerâ additionally states that he was of Greek origin. European sources, meanwhile, provide differing accounts describing him as Greek, Italian, or Albanian.

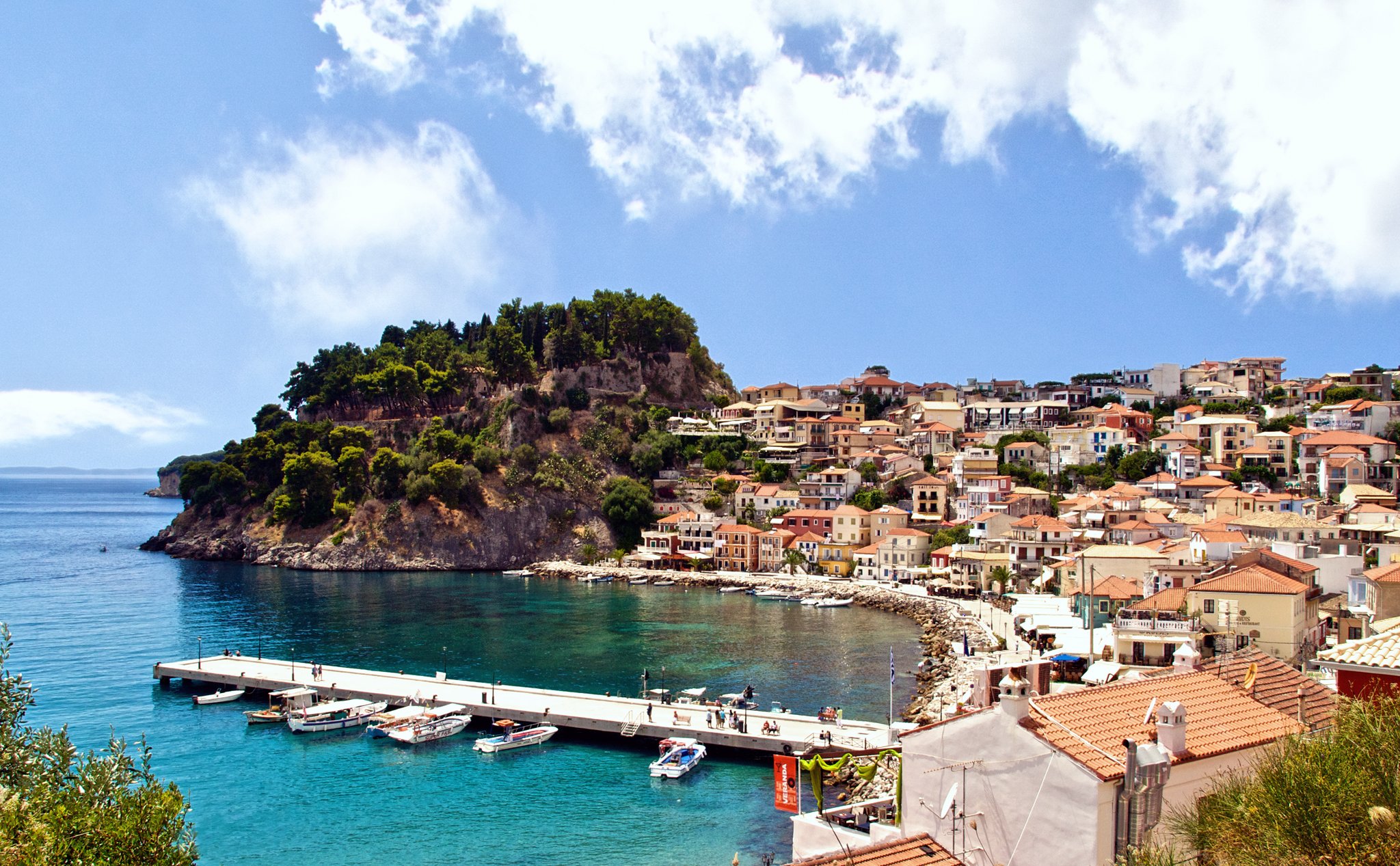
Parga, the birthplace of Ibrahim Pasha, is within the borders of present-day Greece.

Although the exact date of his birth is also unknown, there are accounts stating that Ibrahim himself said he was born in 1494 during the same week as Sultan Suleiman. (Note: In 1532, he told the envoy Jerome de Zara that he had been born during the same week as Suleiman.) Other research concerning his birth generally gives the year 1493. Latîfî and Yılmaz Öztuna give 1495, while Hester Donaldson Jenkins gives 1494. According to accounts, he was born in a village near Parga, which is within the borders of present-day Greece. Reports by Venetian diplomats also state that Ibrahim frequently said that he was born in Parga. (Note: The report of Pietro Zen, read before the Council of Pregadi on 4 November 1524, was transmitted by Marino Sannuto.) Although little is known about his family, his father is thought to have been a sailor or fisherman. (Note: Attributed to numerous sources:) He is thought to have been captured by pirates or during a military raid during the reign of Bayezid II. (Note: Attributed to numerous sources:) He was subsequently taken to Manisa (Saruhan Sanjak), where the Ottoman crown princes served as provincial governors, but there are different accounts of how Ibrahim came to the Manisa Palace.

According to one account, Ibrahim was captured during a raid by İskender Pasha, the governor of Bosnia, during the reign of Bayezid II. Believed to be talented, he was presented as a gift to Prince Suleiman, who was the sanjakbey of Kefe, and went to the palace with him. (Note: Attributed to numerous sources:) According to another account, he was captured by Turkish pirates and sold to a wealthy widow near Manisa. (Note: Attributed to numerous sources:) This woman ensured that Ibrahim received a good education in Islam, foreign languages, poetry, and especially playing the violin. Ibrahim later entered the service of Suleiman, who was in Manisa. (Note: Attributed to numerous sources:) According to this latter account, Prince Suleiman heard the sound of the violin Ibrahim was playing among the trees during a walk and had him summoned to him. He subsequently took Ibrahim into his service because he was impressed by his appearance and abilities. Although the accuracy of all this information is questionable, it is known that Ibrahim served Suleiman in Manisa during his youth.

Ibrahim Pasha never forgot his origins and family. In 1527, his father came to Constantinople to visit him, and his mother and two brothers later remained at the palace. His father converted to Islam and took the name Yunus, and Ibrahim gave him a sanjak or governorship. (Note: Attributed to numerous sources:) This provided his father with an annual income of 2,000 gold coins. His two brothers also held various official positions. Ibrahim, who had been a Christian before being recruited through the devşirme, embraced Islam. At that time, it was impossible for a Christian in the Ottoman Empire to pursue a career of this kind.

== Political and military life ==
=== Early years and relationship with the sultan ===
A miniature depicting Ibrahim Pasha in the presence of Suleiman I; Süleymannâme, 1558.

During the years from his entry into the service of Suleiman I until his execution, Pargalı Ibrahim became his close friend and adviser. Suleiman ascended the throne on 30 September 1520 following the death of his father, Selim I. After Suleiman became sultan, Ibrahim came with him to Constantinople and held some of the highest offices in the Ottoman state, including Grand Vizier, beylerbey of Anatolia, beylerbey of Rumelia, and serasker.

The Moldavian prince Dimitri Cantemiroğlu claimed that Ibrahim was an ordinary Janissary belonging to the eighth chamber. However, Hammer stated that this view was incorrect and that Ibrahim had received a civilian rather than military education. After arriving in Constantinople, Ibrahim first received his education at the Enderun School. During Suleiman's years as a prince, Ibrahim served as an içoğlan and, after Suleiman became sultan, was first appointed head of the hademe-i hassa and chief falconer. He was later appointed chief of the imperial chamber and chief of the inner falconers. (Note: Attributed to numerous sources:) He held these positions for approximately 2 years and 8 months. Before promoting Ibrahim to higher ranks, the sultan took him on various military campaigns so that he could gain experience. In 1521, he participated in the conquest of Belgrade with the rank of kapı ağası. Before this campaign, construction began on the Ibrahim Pasha Palace at the At Meydanı, funded by Suleiman. (Note: The Ibrahim Pasha Palace underwent various changes over the centuries. Today, it serves as the Museum of Turkish and Islamic Arts in Sultanahmet Square.) The construction of a palace by the sultan contributed to the growth of Ibrahim's influence and power. He also participated in the Rhodes campaign of 1522. Ibrahim, who succeeded in developing himself in various fields, exchanging ideas with the sultan, and participating in military campaigns, consequently began to have a say in the administration of the state. At the same time, he increased his personal wealth. Thanks to his humble personality, the other viziers did not develop resentment toward Ibrahim and regarded him as the sultan's companion for entertainment.

=== Rise to the Grand Vizierate and the rebellion of Hain Ahmed Pasha ===
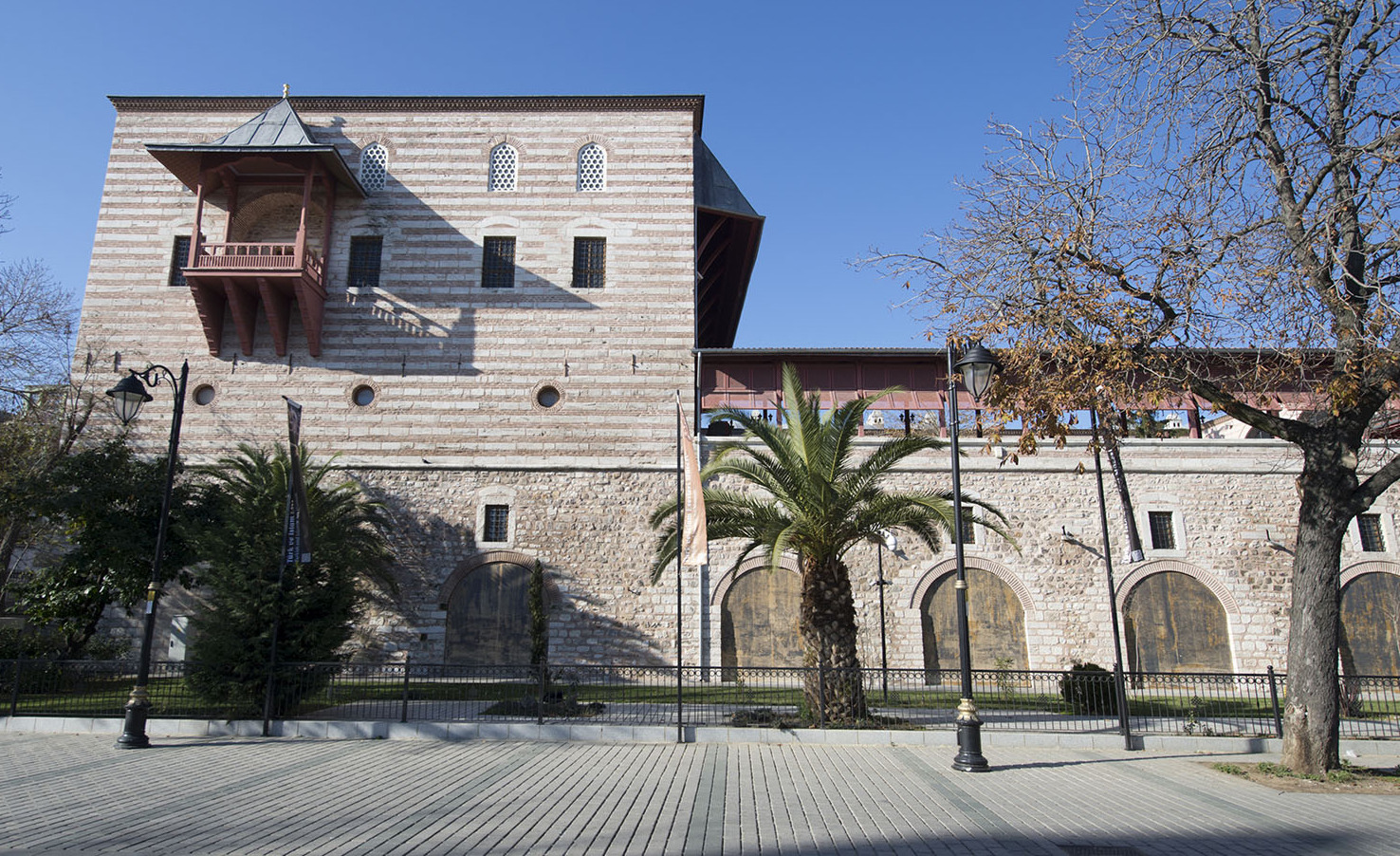
The Ibrahim Pasha Palace, now located in Sultanahmet Square in Istanbul, was presented to Ibrahim Pasha by Suleiman I.

On 27 June 1523, (Note: Some sources date this to 1522 or 1524.) Ibrahim was appointed Grand Vizier in place of Piri Mehmed Pasha, directly from his position as chief of the imperial chamber, in a manner unprecedented in the laws and traditions of the Ottoman Empire. (Note: Attributed to numerous sources:) At the same time, he became the new holder of the office of beylerbey of Rumelia. Since he had no previous experience in these offices, nişancı Celâlzâde Mustafa Çelebi was appointed as Ibrahim Pasha's adviser in order to teach him the rules of the imperial council. This decision was welcomed by the population, who had grown weary of the pressure and rivalry of the previous viziers. After becoming Grand Vizier, Ibrahim continued to hold the office together with the beylerbeylik of Rumelia. The 17th-century Ottoman thinker Koçi Bey, in his critical Koçi Bey Risalesi presented to Murad IV, criticized Ibrahim's appointment as Grand Vizier in violation of established laws and customs with the following words: "He appointed Ibrahim Pasha, who had been the sultan's sword-bearer among the servants of the imperial harem, as Grand Vizier all at once, without observing the former rule. (...) Being intoxicated by the sultan's favor, he did not deign to consult even those who possessed knowledge, and as his negligence reached its height, the order of the world was disrupted."

(Hain) Ahmed Pasha, who had held the position of second vizier during Piri Mehmed Pasha's grand vizierate, was deeply disappointed after chief of the imperial chamber Ibrahim became Grand Vizier. Ahmed Pasha, who had played a role in Piri Mehmed Pasha's fall from favor, was described by Celâlzâde Mustafa Çelebi as follows: "He had a rebellious spirit and rebelled against almost everyone. His heart, intensely ambitious for advancement, was a source of intrigue." Ahmed Pasha and his supporters spread rumors that Piri Mehmed Pasha had accepted bribes. Ahmed Pasha also attempted to persuade Sultan Suleiman to dismiss Piri Mehmed Pasha, citing his old age. Suleiman assigned Kazasker Fenarizâde Muhyiddin Çelebi to investigate the truth of these allegations. Muhyiddin Çelebi, who held a grudge against Piri Mehmed Pasha, reported the results of the investigation to the sultan in a manner unfavorable to him, and Piri Mehmed was found guilty and dismissed from the grand vizierate. Ahmed Pasha, enraged because he coveted the grand vizierate and unwilling to serve under the newly appointed Grand Vizier Ibrahim, began asking the sultan for the governorship of Egypt. The sultan, curious about Ahmed Pasha's fate, granted his request and appointed him governor of Egypt.

When Ahmed Pasha reached the Cairo Palace, he became seized by ambitions of sovereignty and independence. Using the valuable coins and gold in the Egyptian treasury, he brought the leaders of the Egyptian soldiers under his control. He altered the Ottoman laws and order in Egypt according to his own wishes and desires. Upon learning of Ahmed Pasha's actions, Sultan Suleiman dismissed him and ordered his execution. However, after learning of the decision, Ahmed Pasha rebelled and proclaimed himself sovereign under the title "al-Malik al-Mansur Sultan Ahmed Khan", having the kkhutbah recited and coins minted in his own name. Ahmed Pasha seized the Cairo Citadel after destroying the Janissaries stationed there; he did not even hesitate to join forces with Christian troops for this purpose. The sultan sent an army under the command of Ayas Mehmed Pasha to resolve the Egyptian issue once and for all. Ahmed Pasha's troops were also secretly incited to revolt against him. Eventually, one of his commanders, Kadızade Mehmed Bey, who remained loyal to the Ottoman state and whom Ahmed Pasha had appointed as his vizier, attempted to kill him while he was bathing in a bathhouse. Ahmed Pasha nevertheless managed to escape the attack wounded. Although he sought refuge with the Banu Bakr tribe, they captured him and handed him over to Kadızade Mehmed. Ahmed Pasha was subsequently beheaded and executed in 1524.

=== Marriage ===
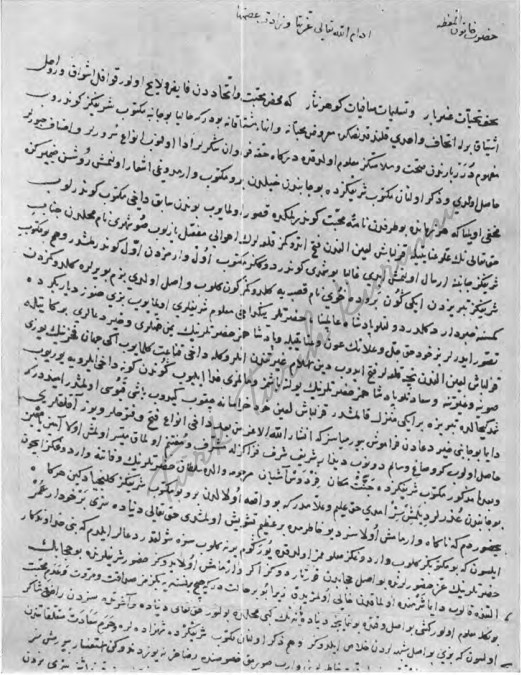
A letter written by Ibrahim Pasha to his wife while he was near Tabriz in 1534.

The identity of Ibrahim Pasha's wife remains a subject of ongoing debate. Although historians have generally tended to suggest that the pasha was married to one of Suleiman's sisters, no record has been found to prove this. Although written sources contain detailed information about Ibrahim Pasha's wedding, they provide no information about the identity of the person he married. (Note: According to Turkish customs, mentioning the harem and exposing the identity of a woman was considered an insult.) Ibrahim Pasha married in May 1524 at the At Meydanı in a wedding that lasted for two weeks. The leading figures of the army and government, headed by the sultan himself, were invited to the wedding.

Some historians, including Joseph von Hammer, Çağatay Uluçay, and M. Tayyib Gökbilgin, frequently assumed that Ibrahim Pasha's wife could only have been one of Suleiman's sisters, based on the sultan's attendance at the wedding and its magnificence. This claim gained further support in the mid-20th century when Turkish historian İsmail Hakkı Uzunçarşılı, in his book on the Ottoman Empire, stated that Ibrahim Pasha had married Hatice Sultan, thereby increasing his prestige. In 1965, Uzunçarşılı published an article acknowledging that he had been mistaken in his earlier claim and that Ibrahim Pasha's wife was not an Ottoman princess. A year later, researcher Nigar Anafarta obtained evidence supporting Uzunçarşılı's argument and published a letter signed "Muhsine" that had been written by his wife to the pasha. There are a total of 11 letters sent by Ibrahim Pasha preserved at Topkapı Palace. In one letter to Ibrahim Pasha, his wife stated that she had gone to the palace without permission to offer her condolences on the death of the Valide Sultan Ayşe Hafsa in 1534; Ibrahim Pasha replied that this had been appropriate, but instructed her not to go to the palace except in cases involving illness or death. Uzunçarşılı argued from this advice that Ibrahim Pasha's wife could not have been Hatice Sultan; in his view, an Ottoman princess would not have needed permission to visit the palace. Uzunçarşılı argued that Ibrahim's wife was Muhsine Hatun, the granddaughter of İskender Çelebi, who commissioned a small mosque in Istanbul's Kumkapı district also known as the "Ibrahim Pasha's Wife Muhsine Hatun Mosque" or "Ibrahim Pasha Muhsine Hatun Mosque" (Note: It is also known by names such as Ibrahim Pasha Muhsine Hatun Mosque and Muhsine Hatun Masjid.) and later gave her name to a neighborhood. Nevertheless, despite opposing views, the belief that Ibrahim Pasha was married to Suleiman's sister Hatice Sultan continued to be widely maintained among historians.

A 1523 report by the Venetian envoy Pietro Zen provides information about Ibrahim's origins and also states that the pasha's wife was the eldest daughter of İskender Çelebi. Ibrahim Pasha's alleged marriage to İskender Çelebi's daughter is also mentioned in an Ottoman historical work from the late 16th century, Ibtihacüt-tevarih. Romanian historian Nicolae Iorga likewise supported the claim that Ibrahim had married one of İskender Çelebi's daughters. Secondary sources, including Âlî, Peçevî, Solakzâde, Mir'ât-ı Kâinât, Ravzat-ül Ebrar, Enderûn-ı Atâ, and Hadîkatü'l-vüzerâ, contain no information as to whether Ibrahim Pasha was a "damat" (son-in-law of the Ottoman dynasty).

=== His journey to Egypt and the Janissary Revolt ===
When the Padishah honors one of his servants, it should be thus
When he completes his favor and generosity, it should be thus
While his honor and worth are at their height in every respect
When he announces his favor toward others, it should be thus
No one found fault with his favor; he became the recipient of his benevolence
When a Shah declares his generosity, it should be thus

— A verse composed after the Sultan visited Ibrahim Pasha by traveling to Kızılcaada

Four or four and a half months after his wedding, Ibrahim Pasha was sent by the Sultan to Egypt, which was in a confused and unstable state following the revolt led by Ahmed Pasha, in order to restore order there. Ibrahim Pasha departed from Constantinople by sea together with his retinue. (Note: On 30 September 1524, Ibrahim Pasha departed from Constantinople with Chief Treasurer İskender Çelebi, Chief of the Ulufecis Hayreddin Ağa, Chief Sergeant Sofuzade Mehmed, Celâlzâde Mustafa Çelebi, thirty sergeants, and five hundred janissaries, aboard ten galleys.) Because it was autumn, the pasha and his retinue encountered strong winds around Silivri and reached Kızılcaada with difficulty. Upon learning of this, the Sultan traveled to Kızılcaada by boat. There, he went hunting with Ibrahim Pasha and spent some time with him before returning. (Note: The Sultan's visit to Ibrahim Pasha at Kızılcaada in a private imperial boat after learning of the incident is regarded as a gesture of favor that no Ottoman sultan had previously shown toward a pasha.) Ibrahim Pasha, meanwhile, set out for Gelibolu once the weather improved. There, he convened a divan and read the Sultan's orders. He subsequently stopped at Chios Island and Rhodes. However, after making several attempts to reach Egypt by sea, the southeast winds drove the ships backward. Having spent approximately 60 days at sea, Ibrahim Pasha therefore traveled overland to Cairo through Syria because maritime transportation was unsuitable.

Until reaching Aleppo by land, Ibrahim Pasha conducted inspections at numerous locations and resolved popular complaints concerning various matters such as oppression and bribery. He had the judge of Aleppo executed because of the poor condition in which the population found itself. He then reached Egypt, where he remained for three months and resolved numerous problems. In Egypt, which had long been suffering from disorder, the leaders of two tribes, Beni Havare and Beni Bakar, were executed on charges of treason. The other tribal leaders in Egypt were made to swear that they would remain loyal to the state. Town criers were sent throughout the city to summon anyone with a complaint, and their demands were addressed. The debts of approximately 300 people imprisoned for debt were paid from the Egyptian treasury, securing their release. Homeless people, the sick, and orphaned children in Egypt were registered and provided with daily allowances. Damaged buildings and monuments in Cairo were repaired, and the reconstruction of the city was begun. Taxes collected from the population were reorganized according to the old rates recorded in registers dating from the time of the Mamluks. Two large towers were built to safeguard the Egyptian treasury. Imperial treasurer İskender Çelebi calculated that after reducing the administrative costs of Egypt, an annual payment of 80,000 ducats in gold could be made to Constantinople. Ibrahim Pasha reorganized Egypt's administrative structure and organization, and this successful system was subsequently implemented in other provinces as well. In addition, he prepared and enacted a new code of laws. Furthermore, because of Portuguese activities in the Arabian Sea and Indian Ocean threatening the Red Sea, he established the Suez Fleet Command at Suez, consisting of fifty galleys, and appointed Selman Reis as its commander. Through his numerous reforms, Ibrahim Pasha brought Egypt once again under firm Ottoman control.

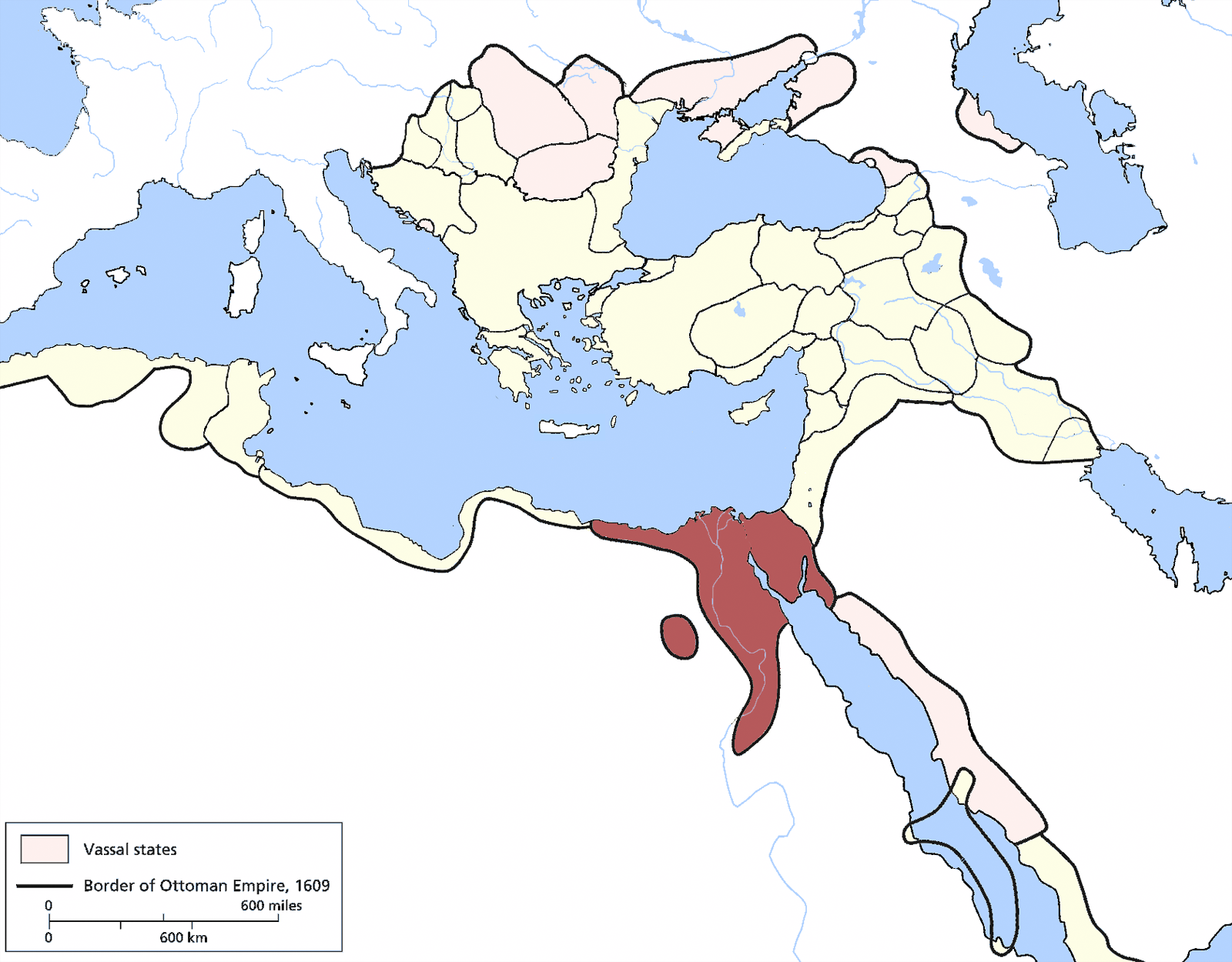
A map showing the Egypt Eyalet under Ottoman rule.

While Ibrahim Pasha was in Egypt, Suleiman traveled to Edirne to spend the winter of 1525 there. After presiding over the Divan two days a week, he spent most of his time hunting. The Janissaries in Constantinople were dissatisfied with this period of inactivity. More than two years had passed since the return to Constantinople from the Rhodes campaign. As they entered a third year without war, the Janissaries had no opportunity to acquire booty without a campaign. When Suleiman returned from Edirne but stayed at the Kağıthane pavilion instead of going to the palace, the Janissaries' dissatisfaction openly turned into a revolt. The Janissaries demanded that the grand vizierate be given to someone other than Ibrahim Pasha, arguing that "there can be no divan without a grand vizier; if there is one, the army cannot be restrained." On 25 March 1525, three days after the Sultan's return, they attacked the residences of Ibrahim Pasha, Ayas Mehmed Pasha, and the treasurer. They looted the customs house and the Jewish quarter. After Suleiman returned to the palace to suppress the revolt, some of those who had organized it demanded gifts on behalf of the soldiers, whereupon he personally executed three of them. The revolt was then suppressed by distributing one thousand gold ducats to the Janissaries. However, the Janissary agha Mustafa, Reis-ül küttâb Haydar Çelebi, the agha of the sipahis, numerous officers, and many people who had encouraged the revolt or were suspected of having turned a blind eye to it were executed or dismissed from their posts.

Following the revolt, Ibrahim Pasha received an urgent order from the Sultan to return to Constantinople, and on 14 June 1525 he departed from Egypt, leaving its administration to the Governor-General of Syria, Hadım Süleyman Pasha. On his return journey, he stopped in Damascus and renewed the privileges held by the Venetians. While in Kayseri, he restored the timars that had been taken from the Dulkadir Turkmen beys. Upon his return to Constantinople, the Sultan's guards and viziers came to meet him four days' journey from the city. Suleiman presented Ibrahim Pasha with an Arabian horse worth two hundred thousand ducats. Ibrahim Pasha, in turn, presented the Sultan with a turban worth nearly the same amount. Ibrahim Pasha's Egyptian campaign lasted approximately 11 months and 6 days.

=== Victory at Mohács and the Anatolian Revolts ===
The Ottoman Empire, which regarded Hungary's rapprochement with the Habsburgs as a threat and had failed to obtain any results from its attempts at negotiation, decided to launch a campaign against Hungary. Ibrahim Pasha, whose influence over the Sultan had increased as a result of his actions in Egypt, was appointed commander of the campaign. On 23 April 1526, according to the Gregorian calendar, the army departed from Constantinople with 100,000 men and 300 cannons. On 3 June, Ibrahim Pasha left the army at Sofia together with the Rumelian troops. He later reunited with the army on the banks of the Morava and, taking the Rumelian troops with him, advanced as the army's vanguard one day's march ahead. After reaching Belgrade, he had the Sultan's tent erected on a commanding hill south of the confluence of the Sava and the Danube, overlooking Hungarian territory. To enable the army to cross the river, he had strong, long chains fastened to large stakes driven into both opposite banks. He then had ships attached to these chains and broad, thick planks laid across the ships. In this way, he constructed a wide bridge. The Sultan subsequently ordered Ibrahim Pasha, together with his troops, to capture Petrovaradin Castle, located on the banks of the Danube.

Ibrahim Pasha made preparations to capture the fortress. Ramps were constructed to reach the fortress. Although troops began to be positioned around the fortress on 14 July, the siege began with the arrival of the main army. On 15 July, a mass assault captured the town outside the fortress. The fortress was then besieged. After thirteen days of siege, the explosion of two mines dug beneath the fortress walls created a large breach. After the troops entered through this breach, 500 defenders of the fortress were killed and 300 were captured. Following the capture of this fortress, many others, including Ilok (Újlak), Ireg, Gregurevac, Cudyek, Araca, and Dimitrofça, were also captured. Ibrahim Pasha subsequently welcomed the Sultan. Suleiman convened a divan there and rewarded the beys who had contributed to the capture of the fortress.

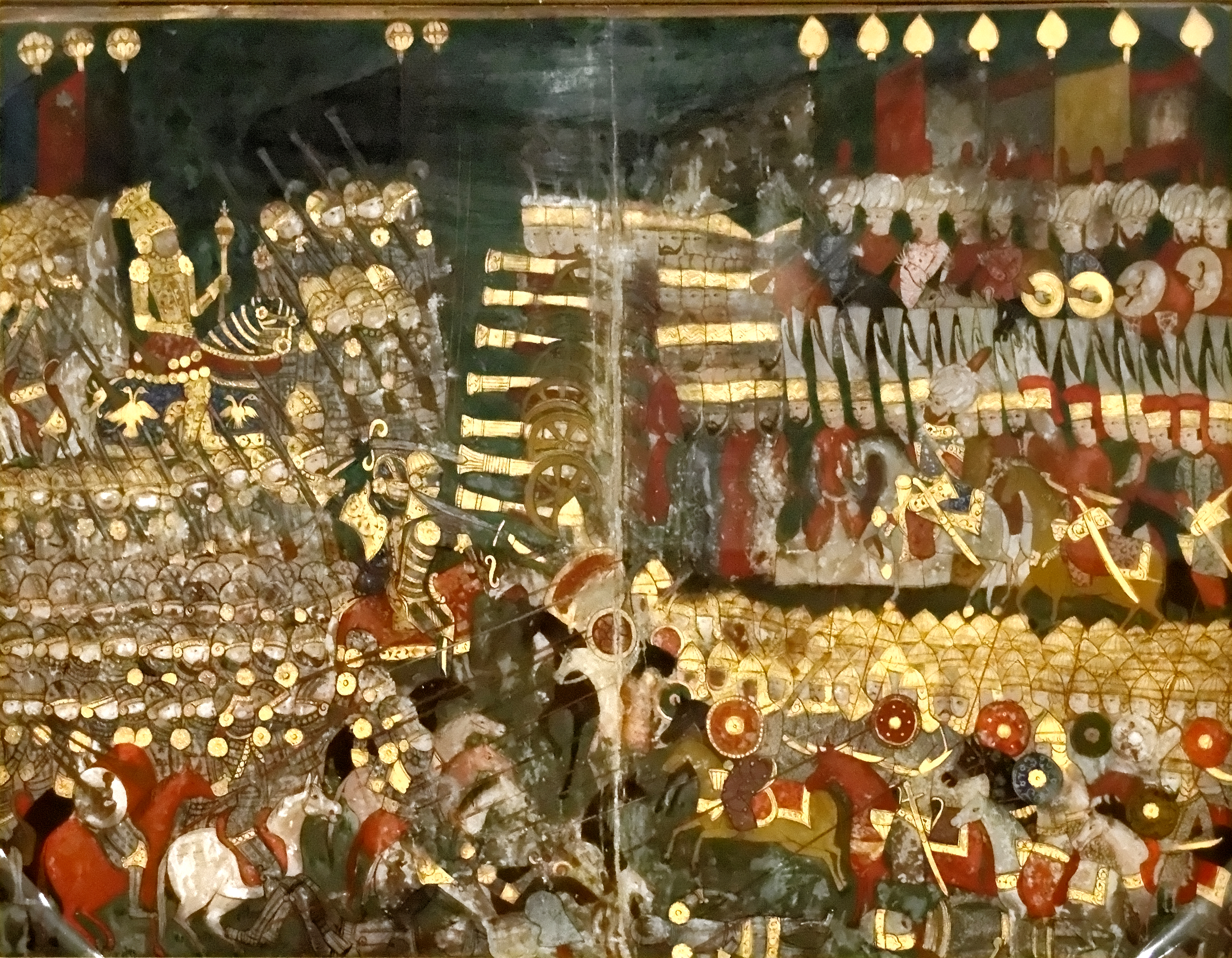
A miniature depicting the Battle of Mohács.

The Ottoman army reached the plain of Mohács on 28 July. After a battle lasting two to three hours, it defeated the Hungarian army, which included soldiers from various European states. King Louis II of Hungary (Note: The name Lajos is also frequently used in Turkish sources.) drowned in a swamp and died. According to Celâlzâde Mustafa, Ottoman casualties in the battle numbered only 150. (Note: According to Uzunçarşılı, the Ottoman army had a total strength of 300,000 men on the battlefield, while the Hungarian army numbered more than 150,000.) On the day after the battle, all the viziers and commanders appeared before the Sultan in front of a golden throne placed before the Sultan's tent to celebrate the victory. (Note: In Ottoman protocol, after every victory, the officials and commanders of the state and army traditionally congratulated the Sultan on the battlefield. Tents and thrones required for this protocol were brought along with the army.) Suleiman personally placed a diamond-encrusted plume on Grand Vizier Ibrahim Pasha's head and praised him. Suleiman announced that the objective of the campaign was to capture Buda.

The victory at the Battle of Mohács was attributed to Ibrahim Pasha by many authorities. In a poetic account of the battle, Sheikh al-Islam Kemalpaşazâde stated that the sky had never witnessed a battle equal to Ibrahim Pasha's fighting and would never witness one again. In the letters of victory that Suleiman sent to the provinces, the Grand Vizier was praised. While praising Ibrahim Pasha for the capture of Varadin and Ilok, Suleiman emphasized Ibrahim Pasha's achievement in the Battle of Mohács with the following words: "The accursed King (Louis II), accompanied by the soldiers of Hell, fell before the Rumelian army under the command of my Grand Vizier Ibrahim Pasha (may God grant him eternal victory!). The brave man then displayed the courage within him."

Three days after the victory at Mohács, on 3 September 1526, the army set out for Buda. When the Ottoman army reached Buda, a delegation handed the keys of the fortress to the Sultan. Thus, the fortress was captured without a battle. The Sultan prohibited any harm to the lives or property of the inhabitants, under the severest penalties, and toured the city with Ibrahim Pasha for two days. The treasury of the Hungarian Kingdom, two large bronze candelabra, bronze mythological statues named Hercules, Apollo, and Diana, all the cannons from the hunting palace, and the books from the library of Matthias Corvinus were transported by ship to Constantinople. The two candelabra were placed on either side of the mihrab of Hagia Sophia, while the mythological statues were placed on marble pedestals in front of Ibrahim Pasha Palace. On 25 September 1526, the Sultan ordered the army to return from Buda. On the return journey, Szeged, Bač, and Bečne were captured.

During the Hungarian campaign, numerous revolts broke out in Anatolia. First, while the Sultan was returning from the campaign, news reached him that the Turkmen of İçel had revolted and that the revolt was rapidly spreading. This revolt was suppressed after some time. However, the following year, the Rumelian, Anatolian, and Diyarbekir governors-general successively attempted to suppress Kalenderoğlu (Note: Kalender Shah; Kalender Çelebi) in Karaman, but they were unsuccessful. Grand Vizier Ibrahim Pasha received news of this defeat while he was in the Dulkadir province and advanced as far as Elbistan with 3,000 janissaries and 2,000 sipahis from his retinue. Ibrahim Pasha believed that the soldiers of the other provincial forces who had been defeated by the Turkmen would damage the morale of his own army by spreading news of the defeat, and therefore continued his advance without taking reinforcement troops from the defeated forces. Ibrahim Pasha negotiated with the tribes that had sided with Kalenderoğlu and persuaded them to switch to his side by promising to restore the fiefs that had been taken from them. Following this maneuver, Kalenderoğlu was left with only a few hundred followers. A small force sent by Ibrahim Pasha subsequently defeated the rebels, and Kalenderoğlu was captured and executed. This campaign lasted approximately 3 months and 11 days. Ibrahim Pasha returned to Constantinople on 11 August 1527 after suppressing the revolt. The rebels' banners were brought to Constantinople as trophies of victory. The Sultan received Ibrahim Pasha with great favor. Following this success, his has (Note: Has: A term used for timars with annual revenues exceeding 100,000 akçe.) was increased from 1,000,000 akçe per year to 2,000,000 akçe. He was also given gifts including a sword, dagger, and similar objects decorated with precious jewels.

=== Appointment as Serasker ===
As the borders of the Ottoman Empire expanded, Sultan Suleiman granted Grand Vizier Ibrahim Pasha the rank of serasker (Note: The equivalent of the modern chief of the general staff) at a Divan meeting in March 1527, with the aim of ensuring control over military affairs. At the Divan meeting, Suleiman ordered the Nişancı Celâlzâde Mustafa Çelebi to prepare the decision as a draft of a berat (Note: A sultan's decree announcing the granting of a rank, decoration, or privilege), using the following words:

With the help of God, our realm has expanded in every direction. It is neither appropriate nor possible for me to attend to all the affairs of this realm myself. I entrust Ibrahim with the execution of the state's important military affairs and grant him the title of serasker. Write a draft of a berat ordering all our servants to obey and submit to him, and bring it to me.

Suleiman approved the draft berat and affixed his tughra. On 28 March 1529, the sultan summoned the Agha of the Janissaries into his presence. All the Janissaries assembled in the ceremonial grounds of the palace square. Nine horses were present in the square, one of which had a bridle made of gold. The stirrups of all the horses were adorned with precious stones. In addition, four robes of honor that could be worn by sultans, nine bundles of precious fabric, and a bilik, (Note: A mounted baton resembling a drumstick, with a rounded head) decorated with precious stones, were presented to Ibrahim Pasha as gifts. Afterwards, all the viziers and the sultan's senior servants went to the pasha's palace to congratulate him. Ibrahim Pasha's berat of seraskership was read out in the presence of the entire public. The berat stated in detail that Ibrahim Pasha was the most authoritative person after the sultan, that his commands and prohibitions had to be obeyed unconditionally, and explained the powers granted to Ibrahim Pasha in detail. His annual has income of 2,000,000 akçes was increased by another 1,000,000 akçes. In addition, Ibrahim Pasha was granted six tughs and seven banners. The practice of appointing a serdar before an Ottoman campaign was an old tradition, but when Suleiman appointed Ibrahim Pasha to the position of serasker, supreme command of all campaigns was permanently entrusted to one person. Ibrahim Pasha participated in the Mohács Campaign as Grand Vizier and Beylerbey of Rumelia, after which the governorship of Rumelia was given to Güzelce Kasım Pasha. Following the death of Çoban Mustafa Pasha, Kasım Pasha was promoted to the rank of vizier, while the Beylerbeylik of Rumelia was once again given to Ibrahim Pasha on 27 April 1529. Thus, Ibrahim Pasha simultaneously held the offices of Grand Vizier, serasker, and Beylerbey of Rumelia, allowing him to concentrate all administrative and military authority in his hands.

=== Second Hungarian Campaign ===
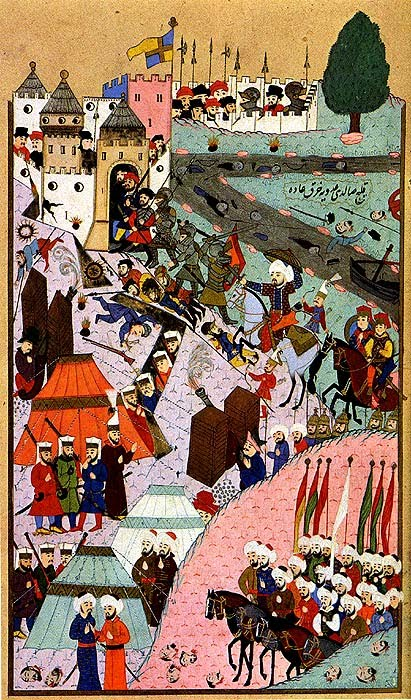
A miniature of the Siege of Buda in the Hünername

The Hungarian nobles who did not want John I—whom the Ottoman Empire had designated as King of Hungary—elected Ferdinand as king instead. When Ferdinand attacked Buda again, John first withdrew to Transylvania and then to the court of his father-in-law, the King of Poland. Ferdinand sent envoys to Suleiman, offering to recognize him as King of Hungary on the condition that he pay tribute. These envoys were held captive for approximately nine months. They were then released with instructions to inform Ferdinand that his offer had been rejected, that the city would be returned to John, and that the Ottoman Empire was preparing for a campaign. John, meanwhile, sent an envoy to the sultan requesting protection. Suleiman informed the envoy that he would return the Kingdom of Hungary to John and protect him, and set out with his army for Buda on 2 May 1529.

The army reached Edirne on 20 May and departed on 30 May after ten days of preparations for the campaign. Since Grand Vizier and Serasker Ibrahim Pasha also held the title of Beylerbey of Rumelia, he separated from the army, which reached Sofia on 20 June, and proceeded with the Rumelian troops as an advance force. He continued advancing as an advance force toward the vicinity of Vienna, occasionally rejoining the main army.

German and Hungarian troops were assigned to defend Buda, which had been in Ferdinand's hands for approximately two years. After the Ottoman army besieged the city, it called upon these troops to surrender. When it received no favorable response, the army took up positions according to the requirements of the military operation. A German soldier captured there was released by Ibrahim Pasha with the words, "Tell them everything you have seen!", so that he would describe the organization and strength of the Ottoman army to the enemy troops and weaken their morale. On 7 September, one of the gates of Buda Castle was captured by the Ottoman army. On 8 September, following half a day of resistance, Buda was retaken and returned to John in exchange for an annual tribute. After taking Buda, the army besieged Esztergom along the route and advanced toward Vienna, where Ferdinand was located. Ibrahim Pasha, advancing with the Rumelian troops one day's march ahead of the Ottoman army, reached Vienna on 26 September and began preparations to establish the siege positions. With the arrival of the Ottoman army on 27 September, the city was besieged. According to various sources, the Ottoman army numbered 100,000, 120,000, 150,000, 200,000, or 250,000 men. The army's strength decreased as troops were detached to garrison the various fortresses and strategic points captured on the way to Vienna. During the First Siege of Vienna, the Ottoman army besieging Vienna resorted to mining because it lacked the large cannons necessary for the siege. Although it succeeded in opening breaches in the fortress walls, it was unable to achieve success because of enemy counterattacks. On 14 October, an assault launched in three waves from morning until afternoon against a large breach also failed, and at a Divan meeting held on the seventeenth day of the siege, it was decided to lift the siege.

The failure of the seventeen-day siege was attributed to several different causes in various sources. One was the Janissaries' reluctance to fight and their desire to return after they were not permitted to sack the city following the capture of Buda. Another factor was the reduction in available provisions resulting from the cold weather and rainfall that began in September. In addition, the departure of German troops sent by Charles V against the Ottoman army was regarded as a military threat that increased the existing difficulties. In addition, some historians, such as İsmail Hami Danişmend, attributed the sudden lifting of the siege on its seventeenth day to Ibrahim Pasha's alleged cooperation with Ferdinand and Charles V. Hammer, however, stated that he had found no document in the Venetian, Austrian, or Ottoman archives that could substantiate this claim. Hester Donaldson Jenkins likewise noted that Ibrahim Pasha's statement to the Austrian envoys that he was loyally devoted to the sultan was sufficient to refute the allegations of treason. Danişmend, citing the campaign's daily records, further stated that two days before the siege was lifted, Ibrahim Pasha, in his capacity as Beylerbey of Rumelia, convened a council of war consisting solely of the Rumelian beys and told them that it would be appropriate to withdraw because the season was advancing and provisions were scarce. It was also stated that Ibrahim Pasha did not order attacks against the breaches opened in the fortress by two mines that had been detonated.

According to tradition, when the Ottoman army lifted the siege, bells began ringing throughout the city. After learning that the bells were being rung to celebrate the city's liberation, Ibrahim Pasha wrote a letter. In the letter, he stated that they had not come to capture Vienna but to defeat the archduke, and that they had wasted time because they could not find him; he added that if they did not know their limits, the Ottomans had the power to teach them again.

=== Third Hungarian or German Campaign ===
After the Ottoman army returned from the siege of Vienna, Ferdinand sent envoys to the Ottomans for a second time, requesting that the Kingdom of Hungary be granted to him on the condition that he pay tribute. His request was rejected. John, meanwhile, was unable to establish full control over Hungary. With the support of the Hungarian nobles, Ferdinand captured the Ottoman fortresses of Esztergom, Visegrád, and Vác and then besieged Buda. Upon receiving this news, the Ottomans decided on 25 April 1532 to launch a campaign into Hungary. As the Ottoman army approached the city of Niš, envoys from Ferdinand and Charles V (Note: Also known as Charles V) arrived. The envoys once again proposed that Ferdinand become king on the condition that he pay tribute, but they received no favorable response.

After the army arrived in Belgrade, the envoys of Francis I were received. During this period, Ibrahim Pasha was engaged in procuring ships and arranging for heavy equipment and weapons to be sent ahead. Ibrahim Pasha had a bridge built over the Drava to allow the army advancing toward Hungary to cross. The fortresses of Kamentvar, Rumelian Eğri, Müşter, Hindvik, and Szombathely were subsequently captured. Ibrahim Pasha was assigned by the sultan to besiege the fortress of Güns. (Note: Although known by names such as Koeszegh, Köszeg, and Koszeg among the Hungarian population, it was referred to as Guns or Güns by other European nations. In Ottoman sources, it appears in forms derived from Hungarian, such as Kösek, Köseki, or Ayaköski.) Ibrahim Pasha consequently besieged the fortress and ordered the digging of mines. The mining attack carried out on the tenth day of the siege was unsuccessful. An attempt at another mining attack two days later also failed when the fortress commander neutralized the mines. Ibrahim Pasha then decided that the fortress should be burned with firewood. Accordingly, all the soldiers surrounded the fortress with firewood. However, on 28 August, the fortress commander Nikola Jurišić sent an envoy to the pasha's headquarters and surrendered Güns Castle to the Ottomans. He was promised that he would be granted a banner. Thus, after the three-week Siege of Güns, Güns Castle was captured. Suleiman, who gave Ibrahim Pasha gifts after every campaign, presented the pasha, following the capture of Güns Castle, with satin fabrics decorated with pearls and covered with gold coins, as well as belts embroidered with gold and silver thread. He also gave him a gold-adorned hamâil. (Note: A sword strap or sword belt)

The main target of the Ottoman army was Charles V, whom Suleiman had challenged to a pitched battle. Although the Ottoman army advanced as far into Germany as Linz, it could not find Charles V, who was hiding in the city. When the envoys of Charles V arrived again following the capture of Güns Castle, they were given a letter written in insulting language in which Suleiman challenged Charles V to a pitched battle. The army, numbering more than 200,000 men, was forced to return because the campaign season had advanced too far.

Various raids and skirmishes took place on the return journey. The ruler and notables of the fortress of Pujağa kissed the hem of Ibrahim Pasha's robe and surrendered the keys to the fortress. Likewise, the commanders of the nearby fortresses of Nemçe and Podgaradç surrendered their fortress keys to Ibrahim Pasha without resistance. Upon learning of the situation, the sultan granted these fortresses to Ibrahim Pasha as zeamets. Suleiman subsequently sent messengers to various people and countries to announce that the campaign had ended in victory.

Ferdinand sent the envoy Jerome de Zara, accompanied by twelve horsemen, to negotiate a peace treaty with the Ottomans. The Treaty of Constantinople was subsequently signed in 1533, and Ibrahim Pasha personally conducted the negotiations. Under this treaty, the Archduke of Austria was regarded as equal in status to the Ottoman Grand Vizier.

=== Iraqeyn Campaign ===
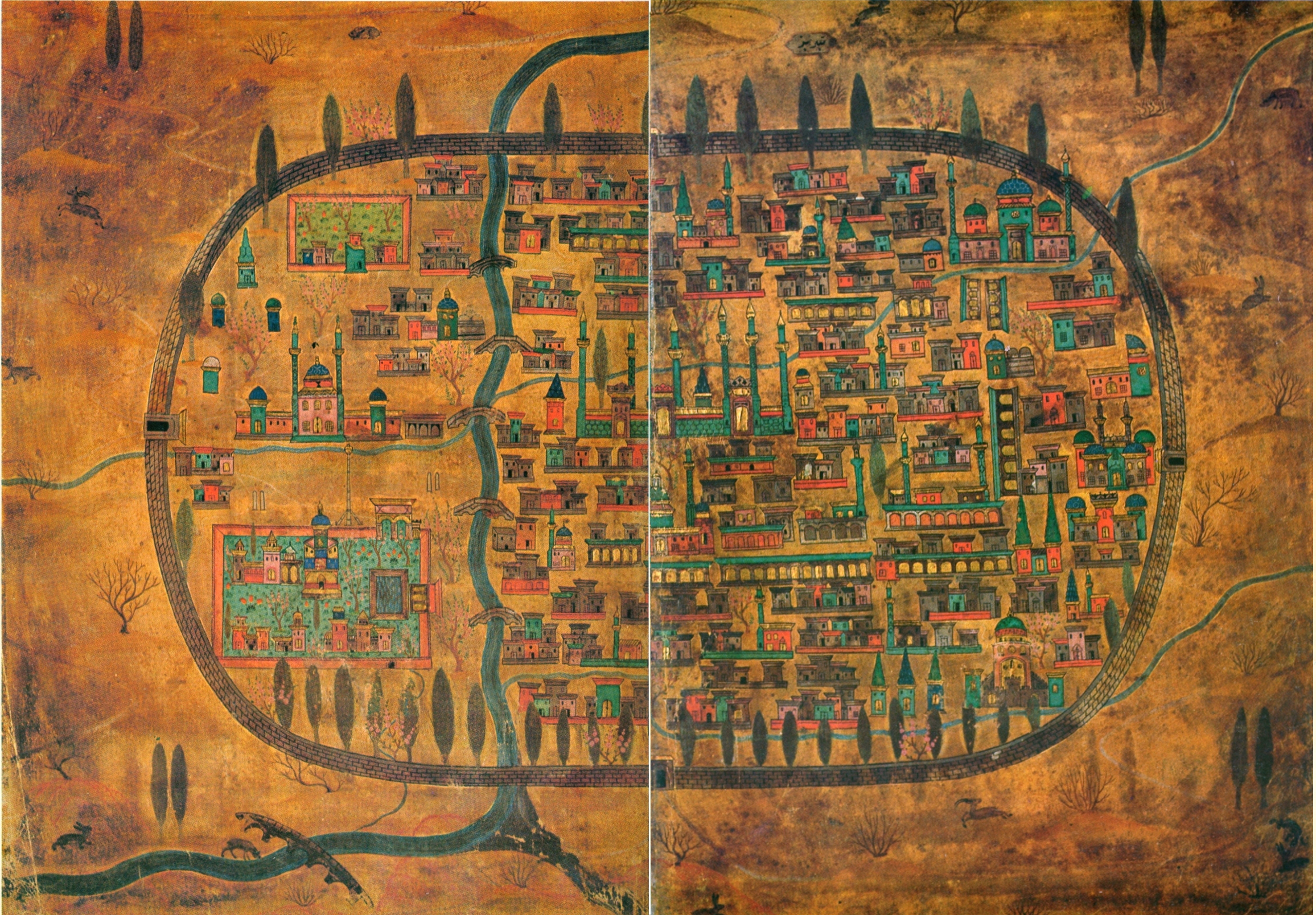
A miniature of Tabriz combining Matrakçı Nasuh's separate drawings of eastern and western Tabriz.

As a strongly Sunni ruler, Suleiman regarded combating the Rafidi Shiite Iranians as a duty. Following the death of Ismail I in 1524, his eldest son Tahmasp became ruler of the Safavid Empire. Suleiman did not congratulate Tahmasp and instead sent him only a threatening letter. At that time, there had been no battle between the two states. However, the defection of Sharaf Bey, the Ottoman-affiliated ruler of Bitlis, to the Safavids, and of Ulama Pasha, the ruler of Azerbaijan, from the Safavids to the Ottomans, led Suleiman—who had already intended to launch an eastern campaign even before the Battle of Mohács—to decide on a campaign against the Safavids. In addition, Zulfikar Khan, the Khan of Baghdad, wrote to Suleiman wishing secretly to send him the keys to Baghdad as a demonstration of his allegiance to the Ottomans. However, the Safavids prevented this attempt, besieged Baghdad, killed Zulfikar Khan, and captured the city. Since the Ottoman army was campaigning in Europe at the time, it did not launch a campaign against Iran.

After the sanjak of Bitlis was granted to Ulama Pasha, he besieged the city in an attempt to capture Bitlis, but withdrew when Sharaf Bey arrived with Iranian forces. Following this event, Ibrahim Pasha was appointed serdar (Note: Commander-in-chief) for the campaign in September 1533. Ulama Pasha defeated Sharaf Bey in battle and sent his severed head to Ibrahim Pasha, who was advancing as the vanguard toward Konya. After Ibrahim Pasha established his army at Aleppo for the winter, he spent approximately three and a half months engaged in military preparations and political initiatives. First, he brought a number of Turkish and Kurdish beys who had come under Iranian rule following the death of Selim I under his control through a combination of promises and threats. Thus, the fortresses of Adilcevaz, Erciş, and Ahlat were captured. At the end of winter, Ibrahim Pasha moved from Aleppo to Diyarbekir, where he reinforced his army and completed his preparations. He intended to travel to Baghdad via Mosul. However, for a number of reasons, Ibrahim Pasha chose Tabriz, the capital of Iran, as the route of the campaign.

There was rivalry and hostility between Ibrahim Pasha and the Chief Treasurer İskender Çelebi. According to tradition, İskender Çelebi was the wealthiest and most magnificent of the statesmen of his time. While Ibrahim Pasha had around 400 slaves, İskender Çelebi was said to have more than 6,000 slaves. It was also reported that he maintained a retinue of 1,200 cavalrymen. (Note: İskender Çelebi's employment of a large number of people was not solely for display. He intended to train capable people who could later competently perform various state duties. Seven of his slaves were subsequently appointed to the positions of vizier and grand vizier. Sokollu Mehmed Pasha was one example.) The first disagreement between the two began during preparations for the Iraqeyn Campaign, when Ibrahim Pasha requested 110 men from İskender Çelebi's retinue, while İskender Çelebi provided only 30. In addition, the sultan appointed İskender Çelebi, whom he greatly trusted and loved, as Serasker Kethüda for the campaign and, according to tradition, warned Ibrahim Pasha to heed İskender Çelebi's advice. Nakkaş Ali, the treasurer of the Province of Damascus, also sought to discredit İskender Çelebi and rise to his position. When the treasury camels were sent on their way, soldiers responsible for the treasury were allegedly accused of attempting to loot it, and 30 soldiers belonging to İskender Çelebi's retinue were executed. Following these developments, İskender Çelebi also worked to put Ibrahim Pasha in a difficult position. Ulama Pasha, who had been appointed Beylerbey of Bitlis and subsequently transferred to another position by Ibrahim Pasha for various political reasons, sided with İskender Çelebi. İskender Çelebi paid a number of people who had fled from the Iranians to go to Ibrahim Pasha and persuade him to march toward Tabriz. İskender Çelebi intended to direct the grand vizier toward Tabriz in order to reduce his influence over the sultan through the difficulties and military failure the army would experience. Although Ibrahim Pasha argued that going to Tabriz would be unwise and that capturing Baghdad would be more advantageous, he was persuaded, particularly through Ulama Pasha's efforts. Numerous fortresses along the route to Tabriz were captured by the Ottoman army.

Suleiman, meanwhile, sent Ibrahim Pasha ahead as the vanguard and intended to spend the winter in Constantinople before departing for the campaign in spring. However, Ibrahim Pasha's relationship with Defterdar İskender Çelebi deteriorated and a division emerged. In addition, because the local population knew that the sultan was still in Constantinople, rumors arose saying, "How can Ibrahim Pasha fight the Shah? A Shah is needed to fight a Shah." This situation concerned Ibrahim Pasha, who repeatedly sent messengers to Constantinople to report that the soldiers were dissatisfied because the sultan was not at the head of the army. Upon learning of the situation, Suleiman departed in June 1534. İsmail Hami Danişmend, however, stated that the sultan had departed much earlier than these rumors and that Ibrahim Pasha became alarmed after entering Azerbaijan upon receiving news that Tahmasp was approaching with a large army from Khorasan, prompting him to inform the sultan.

Ibrahim Pasha established the army's camp near Mount Sahand, close to the Sadabad plain. When representatives of the city of Tabriz arrived and declared their submission, he entered the city with the army on 13 July 1534. After entering the city, he first appointed a qadi and various officials. The sultan was received by Ibrahim Pasha near Ucan in September 1534. A few days later, at a Divan meeting, the sultan dressed several people, including Ibrahim Pasha, in ceremonial robes of honor. From the spring of 1533, when the campaign began, until the sultan's arrival, Ibrahim Pasha retained military and political control for approximately one year and made all the decisions himself.

Although the campaigning season had already advanced by the time Suleiman arrived, the army proceeded toward Baghdad. Because of the late season, however, many pack animals died and the cannons suffered extensive damage from the rains. İskender Çelebi, who was responsible for the army's transportation, was held responsible for the difficulties and removed from his post. Tekeli Mehmed Khan, whom the Safavids had left as governor of Baghdad, sent a letter to the approaching Suleiman stating that he and those under his authority would submit to the sultan. However, Tekeli Mehmed Khan intended to deceive the Turks through this letter and keep open his routes of escape to Iran, and fled before the Ottoman army entered Baghdad. Ibrahim Pasha advanced ahead of the Ottoman army, captured the undefended city, and closed its gates to prevent looting. The following day, Ibrahim Pasha sent the keys of the city to the sultan. In addition to Baghdad's strategic importance to the Ottoman Empire, the city also held spiritual significance because it contained the tomb of Abu Hanifa, founder of Hanafi jurisprudence, the largest Sunni legal school. The sultan entered the city in a ceremony and bestowed robes of honor and rewards upon various commanders. He presented Ibrahim Pasha with a sword decorated with precious jewels and 20,000 gold coins. On 13 March 1535, İskender Çelebi was executed because of his dispute with Ibrahim Pasha. The Ottoman army subsequently moved toward Tabriz. A camp was established on the Sadabad plain, and Ibrahim Pasha and the sultan toured Tabriz.

The Iraqeyn Campaign, the longest and largest military operation in the history of the Ottoman Empire, lasted more than two years and was the final campaign of Ibrahim Pasha's military career.

== Power ==
The most important indication of Ibrahim Pasha's power during his period was that when Suleiman appointed him to the position of serasker, the number of tughs symbolizing the empire's power was increased from four to seven, while Ibrahim Pasha was authorized to carry six tughs. His only deficiency compared with the sultan was the caliphal tugh.

Having succeeded in acquiring the highest administrative, diplomatic, and military powers from 1522 onward, Ibrahim Pasha later reached the highest position open to people outside the dynasty when Suleiman, except when he deemed it necessary, stopped attending ordinary Divan meetings and left his place to the grand vizier as his deputy. In an unprecedented manner, he held a Divan meeting in his own palace. Furthermore, through the Treaty of Constantinople, Ibrahim Pasha, as Ottoman grand vizier, was placed on an equal footing with the Archduke of Austria. It was recorded that the Venetian baili, even while Ibrahim Pasha was still serving as chief of the imperial chamber, frequently called him "Magnificent Ibrahim," in reference to Suleiman the Magnificent. In 1528, the Hungarian envoy Laski told Ibrahim Pasha, "You are the one who governs the Sultan," to which Ibrahim Pasha replied, "I am my master's slave." Ibrahim Pasha's power after becoming grand vizier, whose requests were never rejected by Suleiman, was described by the historian Hammer with the words, "From that time onward, he shared absolute power with Suleiman."

Ibrahim was the sultan's intimate friend. He was his closest adviser and the state's highest-ranking official. The sultan granted all his requests. Suleiman did not make decisions without consulting him. In a report presented by the Venetian ambassador Daniello De Ludovisi to the Senate in 1534, he stated that Suleiman had left the administration of the country to Ibrahim Pasha, saying: "When the Sultan gathers all the pashas and palace officials, he absolutely does not make a decision without Ibrahim Pasha beside him. Ibrahim, however, has the authority to make decisions on every matter by himself, even without the Sultan. For the reasons I have mentioned above, the number of people around the Sultan who give him good advice is gradually decreasing, and his army is also losing strength. ...however, considering that the Sultan is actually aware of all this but does nothing because he loves Ibrahim so much, this is by no means a love worthy of respect. Rather, it is a very dangerous emotion." In the same report, De Ludovisi stated that Ibrahim Pasha "was one of the most important figures and the person who held the administration of the entire country." He also stated that Ibrahim Pasha had used many intrigues to become grand vizier and, in order to remain in office, had punished or executed qualified people around the sultan. In his report, the Venetian diplomat stated that Ibrahim Pasha sought to remain the sultan's sole intimate associate and gave the following incident as an example: "Rüstem, who later became grand vizier, was assigned to a remote part of Anatolia by Ibrahim Pasha, who was then in Aleppo, because of Rüstem's intimacy with the sultan and the importance attached to his opinions. After this, when Rüstem told the sultan that he did not want to go to the post, the sultan said: 'When Ibrahim comes, I will speak with him so that you may return to the palace.'"

The historian Hammer described Ibrahim Pasha's friendship with the sultan in the following words: "Ibrahim Pasha's superiority over his friends, his youth, his distinguished education, and the friendship that the sultan did not withhold from him made all rivalry impossible." The clothes worn by Ibrahim Pasha were more valuable than those worn by the sultan. Ibrahim Pasha often stayed in the sultan's apartments and generally ate his meals with him. The Venetian ambassador Pietro Bragadino stated that when they were not together in the mornings, they wrote important matters down and sent them to one another through mute messengers. Another Venetian ambassador, Pietro Zen, recorded that he frequently saw the two of them together in a small boat and that they walked together in the harem and gardens. Zen stated that Suleiman loved Ibrahim greatly and that the two had never been separated since childhood, a situation that continued after Suleiman became sultan. Hammer stated that none of the viziers who served in Ottoman history had attained the prosperity and favor reached by Ibrahim Pasha, but that none had experienced a downfall as consequential as his.

Ibrahim Pasha served as grand vizier for 12 years and 8 months, of which he held the office of serasker concurrently for 6 years and 11 months. In addition to these two offices, he also administered the Beylerbeylik of Rumelia. Ibrahim Pasha had an annual income of 150,000 gold coins in total: 100,000 gold coins from his office as grand vizier and 50,000 gold coins from his office as Beylerbey of Rumelia.

== European diplomacy ==
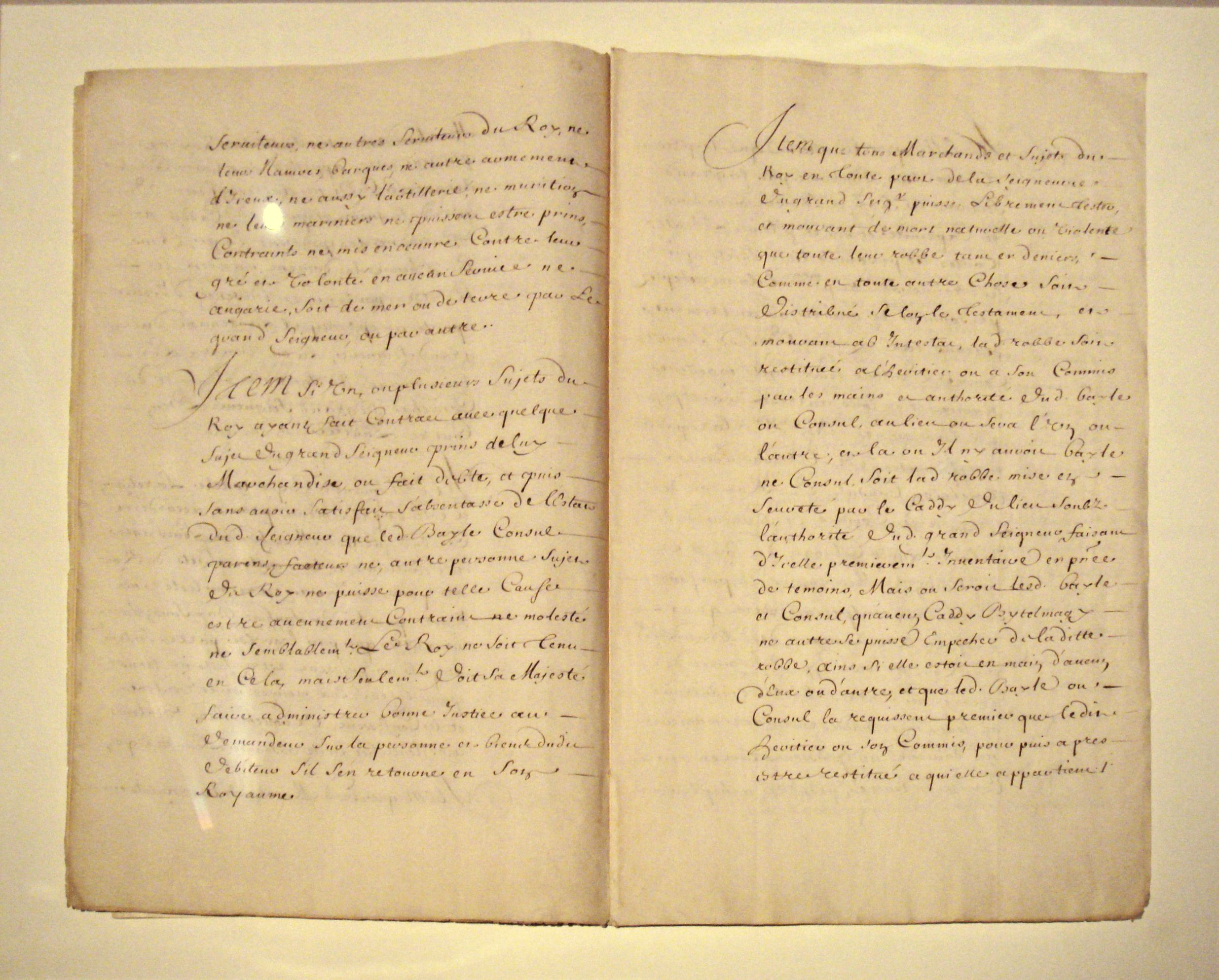
Draft of the 1536 treaty negotiated between French Ambassador Jean de La Forêt and Ibrahim Pasha a few days before his execution, extending throughout the Ottoman Empire the privileges France had received from the Mamluks in Egypt before 1518.

Ibrahim, who wielded considerable influence over the sultan, took complete control of the foreign policy of the Ottoman Empire, which at the time shaped the known world, after becoming Grand Vizier. Although Suleiman personally attended to affairs of state after ascending the throne, from 1526 onward he entrusted all responsibility to Grand Vizier Ibrahim Pasha. After ambassadors arriving in the Ottoman Empire were received by Ibrahim Pasha, they would meet with the other viziers if deemed necessary. Following the ceremony, the ambassadors would kiss the sultan's hand and then meet with Ibrahim Pasha to settle the matter. Ibrahim Pasha was fond of gathering information about others and regarded foreign embassies as an opportunity to obtain information. He received ambassadors who were admitted to his presence in elaborate clothing and without rising to greet them. He accepted the gifts brought by the ambassadors. Although Ibrahim Pasha enjoyed receiving gifts, he rejected offers of bribes on many occasions.

Having no experience in early diplomatic affairs, Ibrahim Pasha sought the assistance not of a Turk but of Alvise Gritti, the illegitimate son of Andrea Gritti, Duke of Venice. Although Gritti had no previous experience in state administration, he was experienced in dealing with Christians. He therefore assisted Ibrahim Pasha in diplomatic matters.

Martin Luther laid the foundations of Protestantism in Europe in 1517. However, the resulting reform movements faced repression from the Habsburg Empire, a Catholic state. The Protestant movement was also supported and followed by the Ottoman Empire because it divided Europe into two camps. In 1533, Ibrahim Pasha told the Austrian ambassadors: "The Kaiser has neither power nor prestige even in his own country. Has he even managed to convene a council? I could easily force the Christian rulers to hold a meeting. If I wished, I could do so now. (...) I would seat Luther on one side and the Pope on the other and make both of them hold this council."

He held talks lasting several weeks with Austrian ambassadors in order to determine the terms of the Treaty of Constantinople, signed with Austria in 1533. Throughout these negotiations, he referred to Ferdinand without using any title because he did not recognize his sovereignty. Ibrahim Pasha referred to Ferdinand as the brother and son of Suleiman, emphasizing that he held a position equal to that of the Ottoman Grand Vizier and thereby humiliating him. In his 1534 report, the Venetian ambassador Daniello De Ludovisi stated that Ibrahim Pasha was striving to maintain peace between the Ottoman Empire and Venice.

Foreign ambassadors first met with Ibrahim Pasha because of his influence. Venetian bailos conducted all their affairs in the Ottoman Empire through Ibrahim Pasha. In the report of the Venetian diplomat Marco Minio, he stated: "Everything he wants is done; the Sultan loves him greatly. It is as if he himself were the Sultan." (Note: Marco Minio's report, read in the Pregadi Council on 8 October 1527, was transmitted by Marino Sanuto.)

Ibrahim Pasha's final international activity concerned the capitulations to be granted to France in 1535. While working on the matter before his execution, Ibrahim Pasha began negotiations with the French ambassador Lafore to regulate commercial relations between France and the Ottoman Empire. This first alliance treaty signed between the two states subsequently served as the basis for all kinds of treaties concluded between the two countries. However, following Ibrahim Pasha's death, the capitulation treaty to be granted to France remained in draft form and never entered into force. His contemporaries described Ibrahim Pasha as the brain and driving force of Ottoman diplomacy. Later historians also supported this view. Jean Zeller, however, argued that Ibrahim Pasha's role had been given undue importance.

== Ambition ==
With the power he had acquired, Ibrahim Pasha became ambitious to rise even further and did not hesitate to use titles belonging to the sultan himself. He openly demonstrated this attitude through his statements in conversations with ambassadors. At first, he boasted about the sultan's power and wealth, but later he frequently praised himself to the ambassadors. During the peace negotiations with Austria in 1533, after speaking to the ambassadors about the power of the state, he emphasized his own power as follows: "I am the one who governs this great state; whatever I do remains done, for all power is in my hands; I appoint the officials, I distribute the provinces; what I grant is granted, and what I reject is rejected. Even when the great sultan wishes to grant or has granted something, if I do not approve his decision, it remains as though it had never happened; for everything—war, peace, wealth, and power—is in my hands."

To the same ambassadors, he said: "Our lord the Sultan, wishing that there should be no difference between himself and me, has ordered that there be two seals, one belonging to him and one to me. If he were to order clothes for himself, he would have an identical set made for me." He continued in the same conversation: "... I possess absolute power, and whatever I want is what the Sultan wants as well."

Continuing his conversation with the ambassadors, he said: "The most fearsome of animals, the lion, is ruled through the effects of power and habit. No one else can approach it to give it food. The lion is the ruler, and its keepers are its advisers and viziers. The stick held by the keeper to tame it is truth and justice, which will guide rulers. I too govern my lord, the exalted Sultan, with the stick of truth and justice."

According to the ambassadors, Ibrahim Pasha later described his power in these words: "Everything I do is carried out. If I wish, I can make a groom a pasha. I can give countries and kingdoms to anyone I please without even requiring my Sultan to investigate the matter. If he wishes something I do not approve of, his command is not carried out. Conversely, something the Sultan does not approve of but which I desire is immediately implemented. Peace and war are entirely in my hands. The imperial treasury is under my control. The Sultan cannot dress more magnificently than I do. Since the Sultan pays all my expenses, my wealth remains untouched. Since he has left kingdoms, countries, and treasuries to me, I can do whatever I wish ..." These words demonstrate the extent of Ibrahim Pasha's ambition for power.

== Downfall and execution ==
There is no certain reason for the death of Ibrahim Pasha, who had been at Suleiman the Magnificent's side since his years as a prince and, after Suleiman became sultan, rose to the highest position in the empire attainable by anyone outside the dynasty. However, it is thought that several factors contributed to his execution: his pursuit of power and use of his wealth in that pursuit; his support for Şehzade Mustafa, whom he had helped raise since childhood, which allegedly caused Hürrem Sultan, who wielded considerable influence over the sultan, to turn the sultan against him; his personality change and harsh conduct during the Iraq campaign; his refusal to heed anyone's advice; and his extravagant financial expenditures.

According to Celâlzâde, the Pasha changed considerably in character and conduct, particularly during the Iraq campaign, under the influence of ill-intentioned people. He had some people executed and punished without any reason. Although he could have destroyed Shah Tahmasp with the large army during this campaign, he instead occupied himself with capturing fortresses in scattered locations. He attributed his failure in this regard to fate and divine decree and accepted no responsibility. During the Iraq campaign, at the encouragement of Ulama Pasha, (Note: Ulama Pasha stated that because some Kurdish beys in Eastern Anatolia and Iranian sanjak beys were called Sultan, it was appropriate for the Ottoman grand vizier commanding the army to use the same title.) he added the title Sultan to his title of Serasker. In addition to the decrees and menşurs issued in the name of the sultan, he used the same title in orders announced by heralds throughout the military camp. Ibrahim Pasha continued using this title even after the sultan joined the campaign.

In the end, that favored vizier
Though ever favored, became the slain
Whoever becomes cruel and oppressive
Will surely deserve to be killed
Such has been the custom of fate since eternity
Everyone must find what he has done

— A verse written after Ibrahim Pasha's execution

During the councils held on campaign, decisions were supposed to be made through consultation as was customary, but Ibrahim Pasha disregarded this and made decisions on his own. He also became angry when religious books were brought to him and rejected them, saying: "You bring so many books; I have no end of fine books." He also spent a great deal of money on the construction of a fortress in Tabriz. During the Iraq campaign, he bestowed favors on many people in order to gather supporters and spent 80,000 gold coins from the state treasury. In this regard, Suleiman told Ayas Mehmed Pasha: "We have become firmly convinced and it has been established beyond doubt that Ibrahim's distribution of so many thousands of gold coins in gifts to scoundrels and individuals is conclusive evidence of his daring and determination to aspire to the sultanate." During the same campaign, he sent a force of ten thousand men to the Kızılcadağ plateau, causing almost the entire force to be destroyed. He also helped bring about the execution of Defterdar İskender Çelebi, earning the anger of many people. According to Solakzade, on the night İskender Çelebi was executed, Suleiman had a dream. In his dream, İskender Çelebi said, "Cruel wretch, you hanged the poor man by following the word of a mischief-maker. Why did you hang me despite my many years of service?" and attempted to strangle Suleiman with the leather strap in his hand. Suleiman awoke from the dream screaming and, raising his hands, reportedly cursed: "O God, Ibrahim, since you had that innocent man hanged, I pray to God that before a year has passed you too may deserve to be killed." However, according to Danişmend, the dream was not authentic, as demonstrated by the execution of Hüseyin Çelebi, İskender Çelebi's brother-in-law, fifteen days after İskender Çelebi's execution. Immediately before his execution, İskender Çelebi also declared that Ibrahim Pasha was preparing a plot to kill Suleiman in exchange for gold received from the Iranians. (Note: Among the Turks, the testimony of a person who is dying or being led to execution is considered important and is regarded as equivalent to that of 40 ordinary witnesses.)

It was also alleged that Hürrem Sultan had a role in Makbul Ibrahim Pasha's death because of his support for Şehzade Mustafa, who was not Hürrem Sultan's son. For this reason, Hürrem Sultan repeatedly influenced the sultan against Ibrahim Pasha. Finally, she persuaded the sultan that Ibrahim Pasha had designs on the Ottoman throne because of the title Serasker Sultan he had used during the Iraq campaign.

One of the debated activities of Ibrahim Pasha was the mythological statues he brought from Buda to Constantinople after the Battle of Mohács and had erected in front of his palace at the Hippodrome. In the Ottoman state tradition, when a country or city was conquered, the spoils obtained from it were brought to the capital, with some being displayed in city squares. These displayed spoils remained there for days or months. This tradition was regarded as one of the most effective ways of communicating the state's achievements to the public. It has been stated that the erection of Hercules, Apollo, and Diana, known as the Three Beauties, in the Hippodrome was intended by Ibrahim Pasha to associate the superiority of the Ottoman Empire with the cultures of Christian Europe, which was in decline. However, this act conflicted with the Islamic rule prohibiting "the depiction of the image of anything above in the sky, below on the earth, and in the water beneath the earth." He began to be referred to as a pagan, and after the statues were erected, the poet Figânî, probably adapting a poem written by Ferdowsi for Mahmud of Ghazni (Note: Another name for him was Ibrahim.) accused Ibrahim Pasha of erecting idols in the following two lines:

Dü İbrāhīm āmed be-deyr-i cihān,
Yeki büt-şiken ü yeki büt-nişān.

Two Ibrahims came to the temple of the world,
One broke idols, the other erected idols.

Ibrahim Pasha was angered by this and ordered the poet to be punished. In the spring of 1532, Figânî was first flogged, then paraded through the city on a donkey, and finally hanged and executed. Following Ibrahim Pasha's execution, the statues were dismantled by certain individuals.

While Ibrahim Pasha was carrying out his work concerning the capitulations to be granted to the French, he was invited to the palace for iftar on the night of 14–15 March. After the iftar, he was strangled by four deaf-mute executioners in the room of the palace where he spent the night. The marks on his body the following morning indicated that he had been strangled after a violent struggle. His body was carried to his own palace on a black horse. There is no marker indicating the place where he was buried. However, some sources (Note: According to the Hadikatü'l-vüzera.) state that his body was buried at the Canfeda Lodge in Galata and that a Judas tree was planted at the head of his grave. The Sicil-i Osmani, on the other hand, states that he was buried at Okmeydanı after his execution. Ibrahim Pasha was executed 67 days after returning from the Iraq campaign. According to the tradition that he was the same age as Suleiman, he was approximately 40–45 years old when he died. Previously known as Makbul ("the Favored"), he was known as Maktul ("the Slain") after his death. Ayas Mehmed Pasha succeeded him as grand vizier.

== After his death ==
The grave believed to be that of Pargalı Ibrahim Pasha in the Canfeda Lodge cemetery, Fındıklı, Beyoğlu, Istanbul

According to Ottoman historians, after Pargalı's death, the empire began to decline both militarily and diplomatically. His death contributed to the weakening of diplomatic relations with the French, because the terms of the capitulation agreement had not yet entered into force before his execution.

In the TDV İslâm Ansiklopedisi, Feridun Emecen stated the following concerning the period after Ibrahim Pasha's death: "The poet and biographer Latîfî, who was a contemporary of Ibrahim Pasha, wrote two separate treatises about him. In the short treatise entitled Evsâf-ı İbrâhim Paşa, Latîfî praised Ibrahim Pasha, describing his generosity and his patronage of poets and men of letters, while also stating that those who came after him attached no importance to poets, writers, and artists, and that the stipends and rewards they had been receiving from the treasury were even discontinued. He went further, writing that the people only understood Ibrahim Pasha's worth after his death."

After Ibrahim Pasha's death, Suleiman did not entrust all his affairs to a single person. Rüstem Pasha, who was the sultan's son-in-law and grand vizier, never became as close to the sultan as Ibrahim Pasha had been, could not act independently, and could not enter or leave the palace without the sultan's permission. Seventeen years after Ibrahim Pasha's death, Bernardo Navegora, in a report submitted to the Venetian Senate, stated: "Among them, Ibrahim Pasha was once one of the favorites. Rüstem is now the Sultan's greatest favorite. No one has ever been loved by the Sultan as much as he is. Ibrahim Pasha is said to have been a very important and great person, capable of doing whatever he wished. Whenever he wished, he told the Sultan what he had done. The Sultan would always praise him for what he had done. Whenever he wished, he went to the palace to see the Sultan. He was more like a friend than a servant. Rüstem, on the other hand, apparently could not enter the palace easily."

Anatolian and Rumelian kazaskers Fenarîzade Muhyiddin Çelebi and Kadri Efendi were removed from office after asking Suleiman, on the return journey from the Siege of Corfu in 1537, about the reason for Ibrahim Pasha's execution. They were replaced by Istanbul Qadi Ebussuud Efendi and Egyptian Qadi Çivizade Muhiddin Mehmed Efendi.

== Personality ==
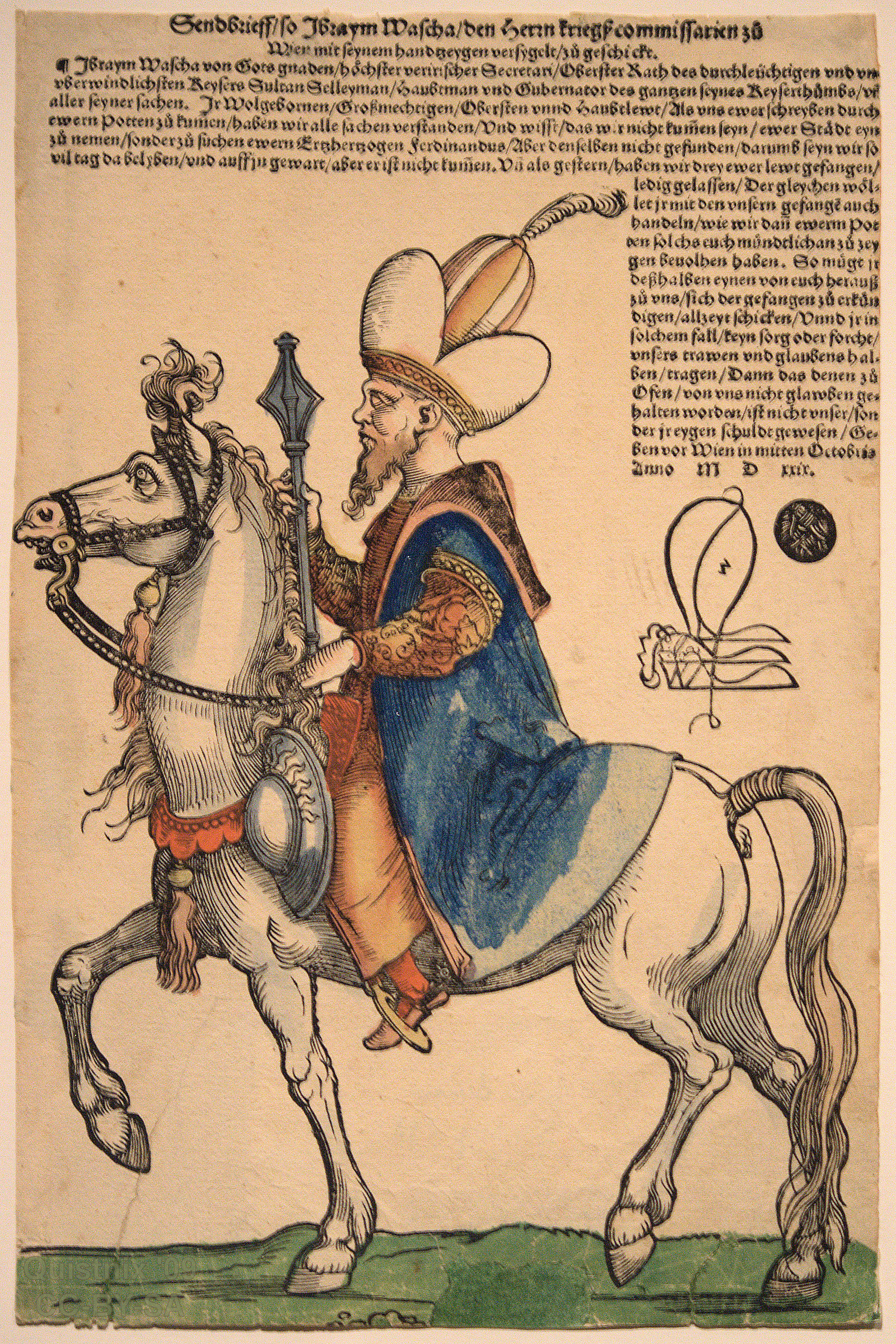
A 1530 drawing of Ibrahim Pasha by Sebald Beham.

Ibrahim Pasha knew Greek, Persian, Turkish, and Italian languages. He was a sought-after figure in conversations because of his musical skill and his love of reading. Having received a good education in music from childhood, Ibrahim was a skilled violinist. (Note: Pietro Zen mentioned that he played the violin excellently.) He composed music with an Iranian musician at the palace. A patron of the arts, Ibrahim Pasha was also a major patron of literature. He was interested in history, geography, philosophy, and law. Ibrahim Pasha particularly enjoyed reading and studying the stories of Hannibal, who resisted Rome, and Alexander the Great, who ruled the Kingdom of Macedon. He enjoyed having novels read to him. Ibrahim Pasha followed Europe very closely and did not hesitate to demonstrate his knowledge to the sultan. Many researchers and historians consider Ibrahim Pasha to have been a great diplomat.

Having received palace training from a young age, Ibrahim Pasha was described by Celâlzâde as "good-natured, well-mannered, enlightened in thought, highly determined, generous, fair-minded, and competent." In the Sicil-i Osmani, he was described as: "Intelligent, generous, and brave, yet he endangered himself because of his bad actions."

In the 1526 report of the Venetian ambassador Pietro Bragadino, he described Ibrahim Pasha as having a thin, small-featured face and being the sultan's closest adviser, recording the following: "He is very curious about what the other great lords in the world are doing, about their lands and countries; he buys valuable and interesting objects, is knowledgeable, reads books, and knows the laws of his country very well. Previously everyone apparently hated this pasha greatly, but now that they have seen that the sultan loves him so much, everyone tries to become his friend, including the sultan's mother, wife, and two other pashas. None of them opposes him in anything. Therefore he can do whatever he wants. He is very loyal to his sultan. He likes receiving gifts in public, but accepts no secret gifts."

== Works ==
During his 13 years as grand vizier, Ibrahim Pasha had mosques built in Constantinople, Mecca, Thessaloniki, Hezergrad (Razgrad), and Kavala, and had works such as mosques, prayer halls, schools, madrasas, zawiyas, baths, and fountains constructed in many places, endowing them with waqfs. He also had many neglected buildings, mosques, and schools repaired during his stay in Egypt, and had new buildings constructed at his own expense.

The "Ibrahim Pasha's Wife Muhsine Hatun Mosque", located in Istanbul's Kumkapı district, was built by Ibrahim Pasha at his wife's request. A lodge near this mosque and the Eski Yağkapanı Prayer Hall on the shore of the Golden Horn in Galata are other works commissioned by Ibrahim Pasha.

== In popular culture ==
- French writer Louis Gardel wrote the French-language novel L'Aurore des bien-aimés, about the life of Pargalı Ibrahim Pasha, in 1997; the work won the Prix France Télévisions in France. The novel was translated into Turkish and published under the title Sevenlerin Şafağı.
- Turkish writer Cahit Ülkü's trilogy Masal Olmayan Masallar begins with the first book, Pargalı İbrahim Paşa: Kanuni'nin Düşü, Hürrem'in Kabusu, followed by the second book, Rüstem Paşa, and the third, Suların Getirdiği Padişah 2. Selim.
- Ibrahim Pasha was portrayed by Serdar Deniz in the 2003 television series Hürrem Sultan. In the Turkish historical television series Muhteşem Yüzyıl, produced by Tims Productions and primarily based on the life of Ottoman sultan Suleiman I, Pargalı Ibrahim Pasha was portrayed by actor Okan Yalabık. He was executed at the end of episode 82, in accordance with the historical account. He appeared only through voice acting in episode 104. He was portrayed by Cansel Elçin in the 2022 Turkish television series Barbaros Hayreddin: Sultanın Fermanı.
- He appears as an Ottoman governor in the expansion pack Civilization VI: Gathering Storm for the video game Civilization VI.

== Notes ==
Political offices
Preceded by Piri Mehmed Pasha	Grand Vizier of the Ottoman Empire; 27 June 1523 – 14 March 1536	Succeeded by Ayas Mehmed Pasha
Preceded by Güzelce Kasım Pasha	Ottoman Governor of Egypt; 1525	Succeeded by Güzelce Kasım Pasha
