= Venetian helmet =

Regal headpiece worn by Suleiman the Magnificent

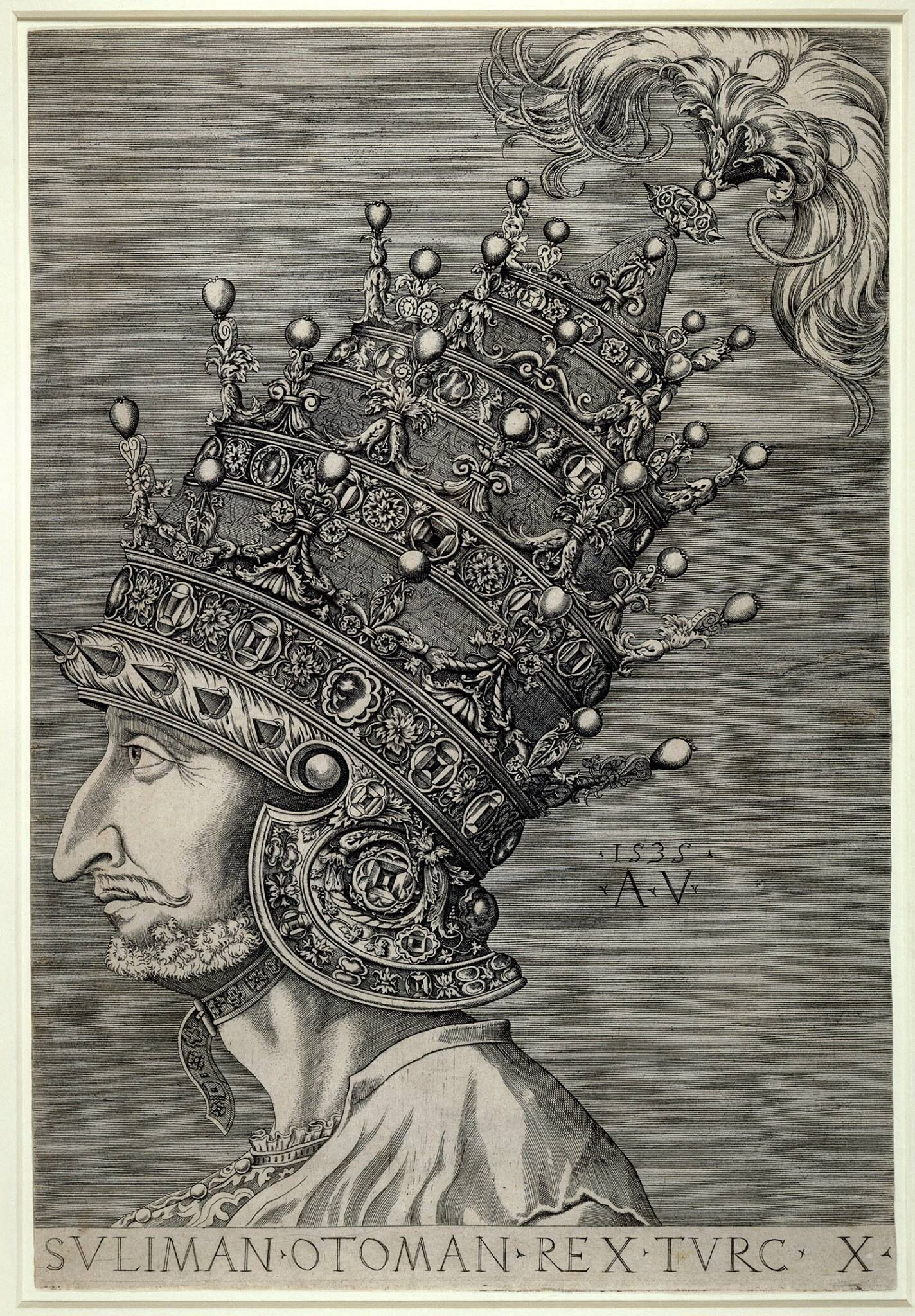
Illustration of Suleiman the Magnificent wearing his Venetian helmet, a four-tiered crown designed to stress that the sultan outranked even the pope (who wore a three-tiered crown)

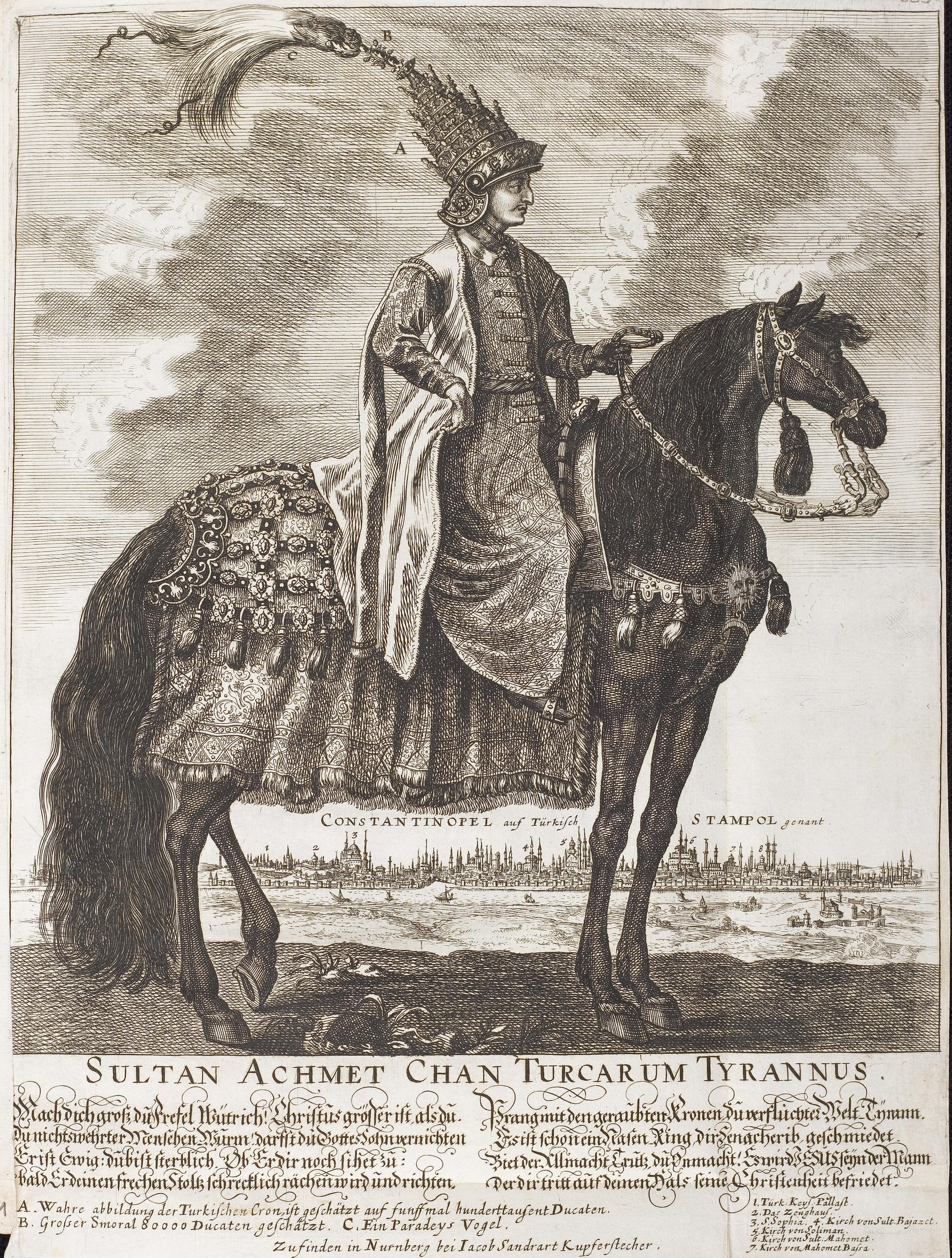
Depiction of Ahmed I with the Venetian helmet, by Arolsen Klebeband

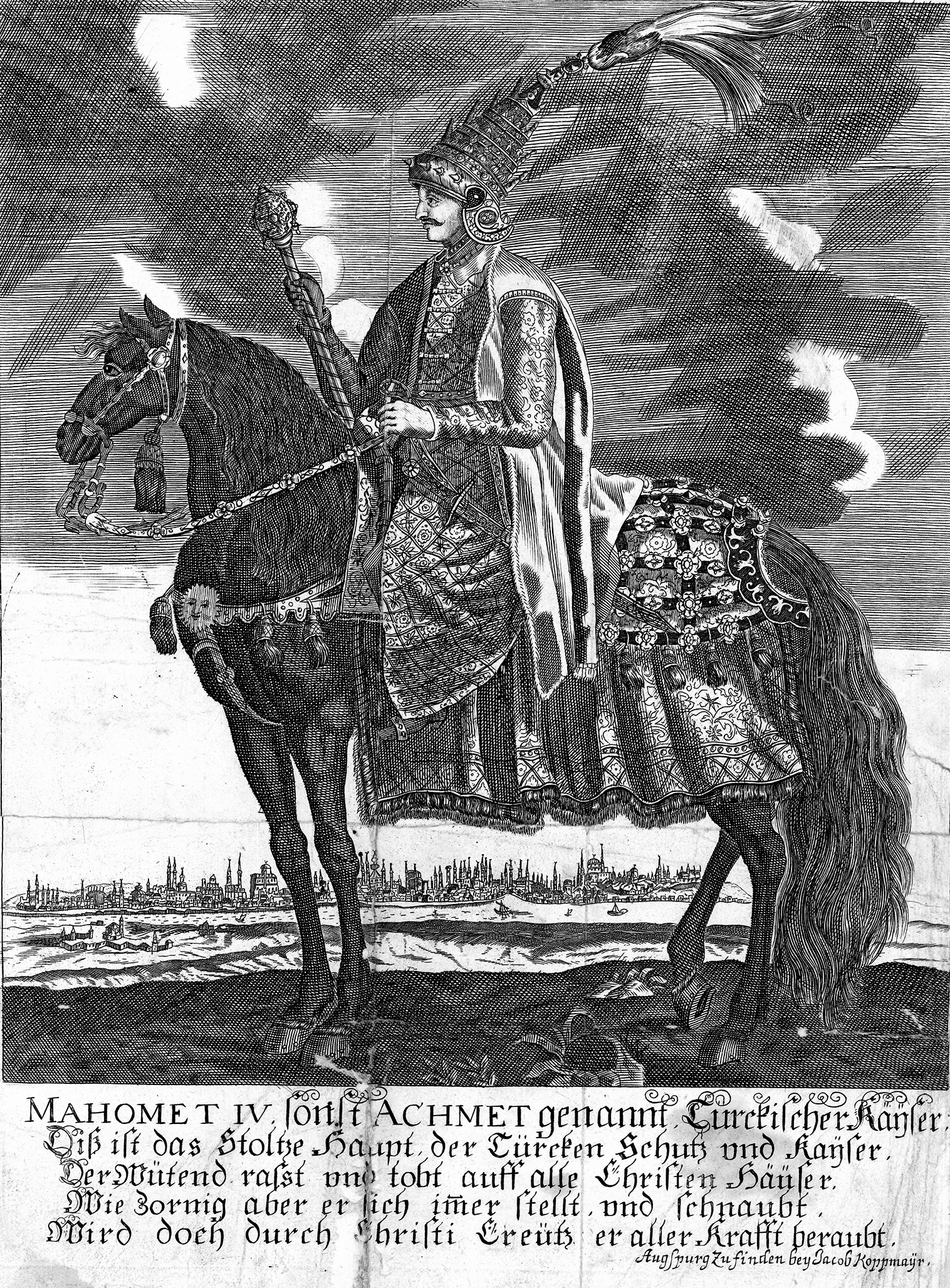
Depiction of Mehmed IV with the Venetian helmet, by Jacob Koppmayer (1640-1701)

The Venetian helmet was an elaborate headpiece designed to project the sultan's power in the context of the Ottoman–Habsburg rivalry. It was acquired by the sultan in 1532. The rivalry with the Habsburg monarchy was one of the most significant political and military relationships addressed by the sultan during his reign. In addition to military campaigns, Suleiman also took political and diplomatic steps in order to advance the Ottoman position, promoting trade with European powers and purchasing expensive jewels such as the helmet. The key figures behind the purchase of the helmet were Grand Vizier Ibrahim Pasha and his chief advisors, İskender Çelebi, the chief treasurer, and Alvise Gritti, a powerful jewellery merchant based in the Ottoman capital Konstantinyye, or Istanbul, as it was renamed in 1930.

After the 16th century, the helmet was long known only from the closely similar prints by Agostino Veneziano and others (it is not entirely clear which of these first created the image). These appear to combine the features of Suleiman lifted from other portraits available in Venice, while the helmet itself was recorded when it was exhibited in Venice, before it reached the sultan. The helmet was widely thought to be a fanciful invention of the printmakers, until 20th-century scholars rediscovered the records of the real object.

== Design and iconography ==
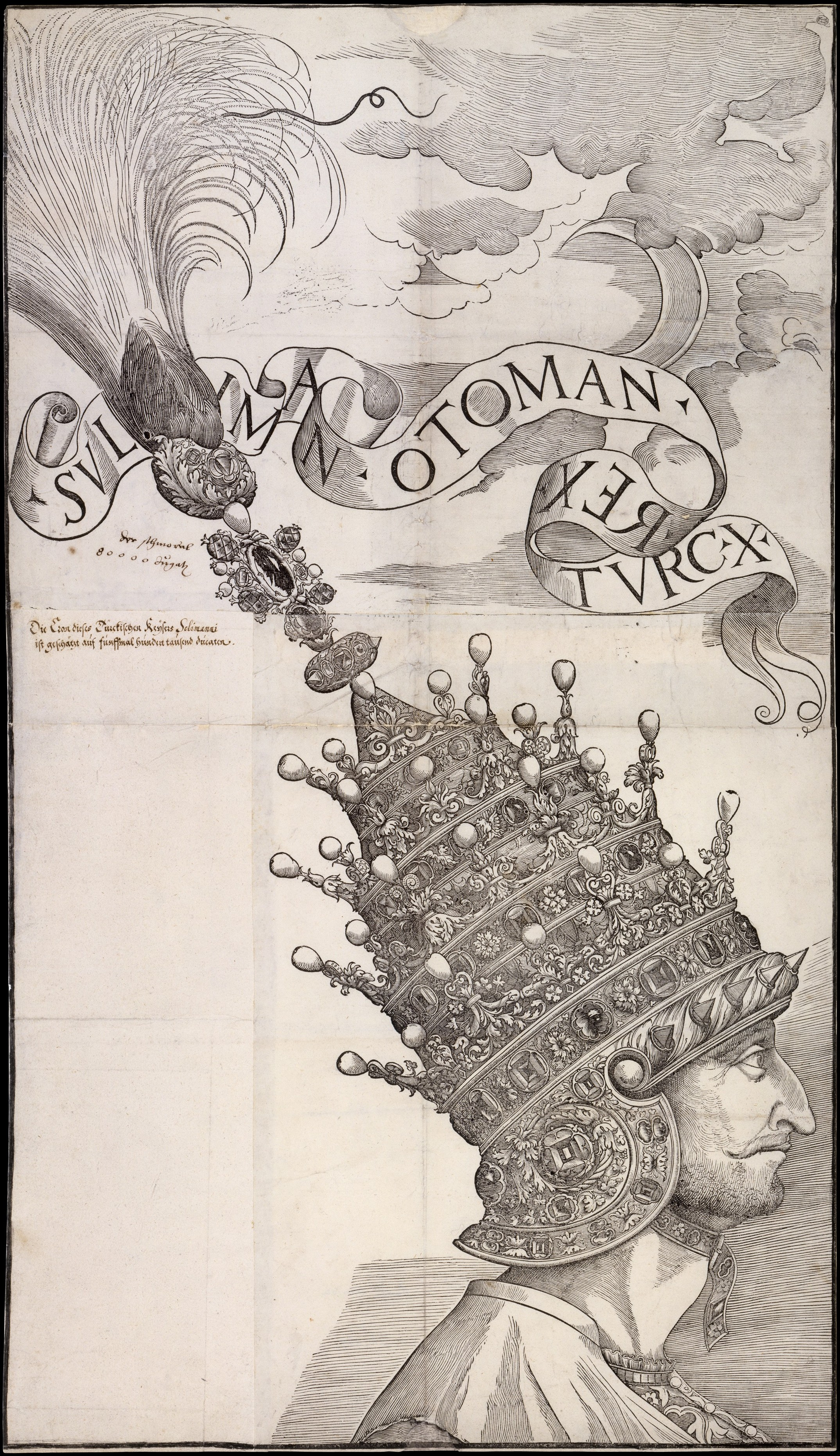
Illustration by Agostino Veneziano showing Suleiman the Magnificent wearing the Sultan's Venetian Helmet, a four-tiered crown, 1535

The helmet-crown consisted of four crowns set inside an Austrian-style helmet, and was topped by "a plumed aigrette with a crescent-shaped mount". The crown was made of gold, and studded with "enormous twelve-carat pearls, a head band with pointed diamonds, forty-seven rubies, twenty-seven emeralds, forty-nine pearls, and a large turquoise". The total value of the piece was estimated at 115,000 Venetian ducats.

Later sources greatly inflated the value of the piece, with some claiming it was worth upwards of 500,000 ducats, equivalent to 1,750 kg (56,000 ozt) of gold. Grand Vizier Ibrahim Pasha, famous for his taste for finery, likely commissioned the crown in 1532 from Venetian goldsmith Luigi Caorlini and his partners. Ibrahim Pasha's advisors, the Venetian-born Alvise Gritti, and the defterdar (treasury secretary) Iskender, were instrumental in organising the commission and purchase. Gritti in particular made a fortune supplying Suleiman with gold and fine jewels from Europe. The helmet was probably conceived as a response to the coronation of the Habsburg ruler Charles V as Holy Roman Emperor two years previously by Pope Clement VII. The helmet's design suggests it was a direct rebuke to both Charles's crown and the three-tiered tiara worn by the Pope. The four tiers of the helmet trumped the Pope and advertised Sultan Suleiman's claim to world domination. The helmet was delivered on May 12, 1532, to Ibrahim Pasha from Venice.

== Use ==
The helmet may never have been worn by Suleiman, but is recorded as being used as part of a display of extravagant objects set out beside him to impress Western envoys. The helmet played a role during Suleiman's campaign against the Habsburg capital, Vienna, in 1532. As part of a larger set of objects, including a bejeweled saddle and throne, the helmet was meant to advertise to a European audience not only the Ottoman sultan's vast wealth, but also his claims to the title of Emperor and universal sovereignty. Contemporary accounts state "an enormous fortune was spent to exhibit the sultan’s magnificence" as the helmet and other regalia were paraded from Istanbul towards Vienna. In Belgrade, streets were decorated with triumphal arches in the style of the Roman Empire as Suleiman marched through along with a retinue of pages dressed in finery, including one that likely wore the helmet. In the city of Nish, Habsburg envoys were made to watch a similar procession from the top of a minaret. Later, those same envoys appeared before the sultan. The carefully choreographed audience left the envoys "speechless corpses" as they gazed on the helmet, together with an associated collection of gold and jeweled items laid out in the Sultan's reception tent. The impact of this parade lasted long after the campaign of 1532. Woodcuts of the crown were partly responsible for Suleiman's title of "Magnificent" in the West. The image of the crown also seeped into European plays and operas of the time.

== Destruction and loss ==
Despite its enormous cost, the helmet had little meaning in an Ottoman context, as sultans did not traditionally wear crowns. It is likely that the four crowns topping the helmet were melted down for reuse at a later date, while the helmet itself, which formed the lowest level of the piece, was possibly presented as a gift to Ferdinand I, Holy Roman Emperor as a similar crown appears in contemporary woodcuts.

== Sources ==
- Keating, Jessica, "Otto Kurz's Global Vision", in The Globalization of Renaissance Art: A Critical Review, ed. Daniel Savoy, 2017, BRILL, ISBN 9004355790, 9789004355798, google books
- Necipoglu, Gülru (1989). "Süleyman the Magnificent and the Representation of Power in the context of Ottoman-Hapsburg-Papal Rivalry". The Art Bulletin. 71 (3).
