= Ibrahim Pasha Palace =

Ottoman palace

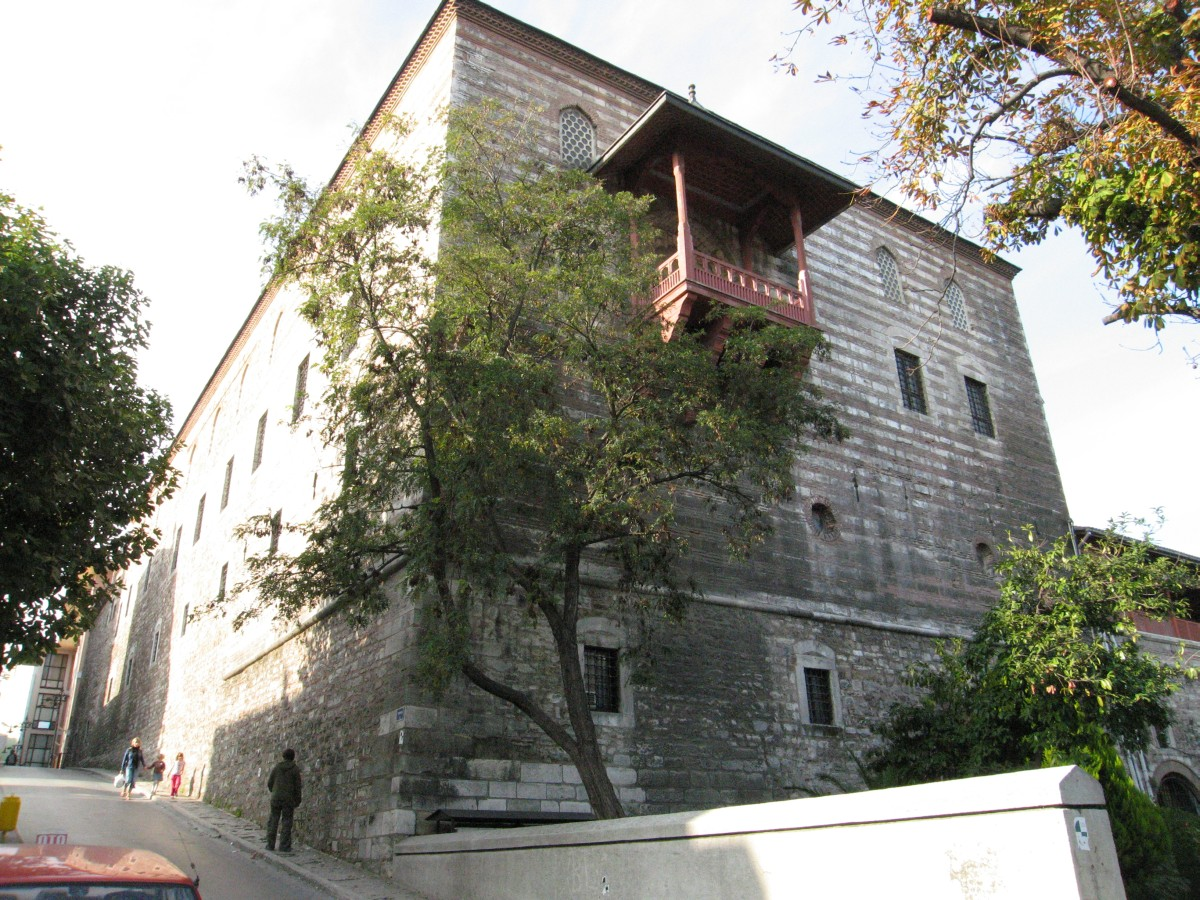
- Ibrahim Pasha Palace in Sultanahmet Square

- Location within Istanbul

General information
- Type: Palace
- Location: Fatih, Istanbul, Turkey
- Coordinates: 41°00′21″N 28°58′28″E
- Owner: Turkish state

The Ibrahim Pasha Palace (Turkish: İbrahim Paşa Sarayı) is an Ottoman imperial court residence of Pargalı Ibrahim Pasha. It is located in Sultanahmet Square of Fatih district in Istanbul, Turkey. Currently, the building is mainly used as the Turkish and Islamic Arts Museum (Turkish: Türk ve İslam Eserleri Müzesi).

Initially named the Hippodrome Palace due to its location at the Hippodrome of Constantinople, it took later its name from Pargalı Ibrahim Pasha (1494–1536), who served as the Grand Vizier of Suleiman the Magnificent (reigned 1520–1566) from 1523 until his execution in 1536. An important example of 16th-century Ottoman architecture, the building is situated on the grounds of Eastern Roman Empire's historical hippodrome. According to Ottoman historian Solakzade Mehmet Hemdemi Efendi (1590–1657), even the construction date of the palace is not certainly known, it is believed that it coincides to the Sultan Bayezid II era (reigned 1481–1512). It is known that the building underwent repairs in 1521.

The palace saw many events such as civil disorder and revolts aside weddings, festivities and celebrations. After Ibrahim Pasha's strangling, the palace served as residence for other grand viziers, and functioned also as military quarters, embassy, revenue office, quarters for the Ottoman military band, sewing works and prison.

== Republican era ==
The building complex remained in state of neglect. Architect Sedat Çetintaş discovered the vacant building, which was considered to be demolished to make place for a new palace of justice. He published an article on the historical value of the building in the daily Cumhuriyet on June 5, 1938. This publication prevented indeed its demolition. However, sometime later the section of the palace consisting of harem and the ambassador's hall was pulled down in a hurry. Çetintaş struggled for twelve years to save the historical building. The main argument for its demolition was that it had been renovated by an Armenian at some point, for which it would not be able to be considered part of the Turkish patrimony. The decision to keep the palace was taken during the presidency of İsmet İnönü in 1946.

== Modern use ==
A part of the still intact palace buildings hosted judicial archives of the Ministry of Justice between 1983 and 2012. Istanbul Directoriate of Land Registry and Cadastre houses in another section of the complex. An important section is reserved for the Turkish and Islamic Arts Museum. In 2012, the judicial archives moved out, and its space was transferred to the Minister of Culture to be appended to the museum. The Ministry of Culture initiated efforts to add the last remaining place to the museum.

Former Minister of Culture Ertuğrul Günay campaigns for the rebuilding of the demolished section of the palace.
