= Frenk =

Frenk is a surname. Notable people with the surname include:

- Carlos Frenk (born 1951), Mexican-British cosmologist
  - Navarro-Frenk-White profile, spatial distribution of dark matter predicted from N-body simulations
- Julio Frenk (born 1953), Mexican academic administrator, physician and sociologist
- Margit Frenk (1925–2025), German-Mexican philologist, folklorist and translator
- Mariana Frenk-Westheim (1898–2004), German-Mexican writer of prose, Hispanist, lecturer in literature, museum curator, and translator

Given name

- Frenk Keukens (born 1995), Dutch footballer

== See also ==
- Frenk DJ (born 1983), Italian disc jockey
- Frenk Ibrahim Pasha (1495–1536), Ottoman grand vizier
