= Irakeyn campaign =

Military campaign of the Ottoman Army

- Part of Ottoman–Safavid War (1532–1555)
- A map showing the route of the Irakeyn campaign and the borders after the expedition.
Date	1533–1536
Location	Tabriz
Result	Ottoman victory

Belligerents
Ottoman Empire	Safavid Iran

Commanders and leaders
(Ottoman Empire) Suleiman the Magnificent (Ottoman Empire) Pargalı Ibrahim Pasha	Tahmasp I

Strength
30,000–35,000; 90,000–95,000 or 150,000	7,000

Casualties and losses
30,000	Unknown

The Irakeyn campaign was one of the largest and longest-lasting military campaigns of the Ottoman Army towards the east. Because it involved entering the northwestern part of Iran, known as Iraq-i Acem, and Baghdad and its surrounding areas, known as Iraq-i Arab, it is referred to in historical sources as the Irakeyn (Two Iraqi) campaign.

== Campaign ==
Sultan Suleiman, during the expansion of the Ottoman Empire, proposed that the Uzbeks attack the Safavid Empire from the east. Abdullah Khan readily accepted the proposal, and in 1533, the Uzbeks attacked the Safavid borders from the east, while the Ottomans attacked from the west. After securing the European borders for a time through the peace treaty with the Habsburgs in 1533, Suleiman I immediately began preparations for the Iranian campaign and sent his Grand Vizier, Pargalı Ibrahim Pasha, to lead the expedition at the end of October, granting him extensive powers. Arriving in Aleppo in December 1533 and spending the winter there, Ibrahim Pasha came to Diyarbakır in May 1534 and headed towards Tabriz, capturing the largely deserted city on August 6, 1534.

Departing from Üsküdar on June 14, Suleiman I arrived in Konya on July 20. In Konya, he visited the tomb of Mevlana Celaleddin Rumi. Following the Kayseri-Sivas-Erzincan route, he entered Tabriz on September 28. Still affected by their defeat at Chaldiran in 1514 against Selim I, the Safavids, instead of engaging in pitched battles with the Ottomans who possessed superior firepower, resisted by destroying the routes the Ottoman army would take and launching surprise attacks. Although the Ottoman army reached Sultaniye under difficult conditions, they could not find any trace of Shah Tahmasp I. From there, the Ottoman army, struggling with difficult terrain and weather conditions, advanced towards Baghdad. After the Safavid forces under the command of Tekelü Mehmed Han abandoned the city and fled, Baghdad was captured by Ottoman forces on December 1534.

Suleiman the Magnificent, who spent the winter of 1534–1535 in Baghdad, established the Ottoman state organization there. He visited the religiously significant places in Baghdad. Wanting to definitively eliminate the Safavid threat, Suleiman I, upon hearing that the Shah had recaptured Tabriz and was besieging Van, took action. Arriving in Tabriz on July 3, 1535, the Ottoman Sultan advanced as far as Dergezin in Iran to pursue the constantly fleeing forces of Shah Tahmasb. However, finding no trace of Tahmasb, they returned to Tabriz. The Ottoman army under Suleiman's command evacuated Tabriz and arrived in Ahlat on September 23, 1535, where they remained for a while.

Upon the Ottoman army's evacuation of Tabriz, Tahmasb moved swiftly, entered the city, and subsequently captured Van. During this period, the Safavid army, which besieged Erciş, failed to capture the city, and the Ottoman forces also failed to recapture Van. Upon learning that winter had advanced considerably and that Shah Tahmasb had left Van with troops, Suleiman the Magnificent did not launch an offensive. Instead, he secured the border region, then proceeded from Ahlat to Bitlis, from there to Diyarbakır, and via Aleppo, Antakya, the Gülek Pass, and Konya, finally arriving in Istanbul on January 8, 1536. As a result of the longest and largest military campaign of Ottoman history towards the east, Ottoman rule began in Baghdad, Basra, and the surrounding areas.
