= Hain Ahmed Pasha =

Ottoman governor, later sultan of Egypt

Hain Ahmed Pasha (lit. Ahmed Pasha 'the Traitor'; died 1524), was an Ottoman governor (beylerbey) and a statesman, who became the Ottoman governor of Egypt Eyalet in 1523.

== Early life ==
Ahmed Pasha was of Georgian origin. He was educated in the Enderun palace school.

== Declaring himself the sultan of Egypt ==
Ahmed Pasha wanted to become the grand vizier, and persuaded Suleiman the Magnificent to dismiss Piri Mehmed Pasha, using his old age. His rival Pargalı Ibrahim Pasha was appointed (June 1523) instead as grand vizier, so Ahmed Pasha asked the sultan to make him the governor of Egypt Eyalet. Upon arriving in Egypt, Ahmed Pasha declared himself the independent sultan of Egypt. He struck coins with his own face and name in order to legitimize his power, and captured Cairo Citadel and the local Ottoman garrisons in January 1524.

== Death ==
After surviving an assassination attempt in his bath by two emirs that he had previously sacked, he fled Cairo. Ottoman authorities finally captured him and executed him by decapitation. His rebellion occasioned a short period of instability in the nascent Egypt Eyalet. After his death, his rival Pargalı İbrahim Pasha visited Egypt and reformed the provincial military and civil administration.

== Family ==
Ahmed married Ilaldi Sultan, a daughter of Sultan Bayezid II. They had at least a son and a daughter:

- Sultanzade Koçî Bey. He married his cousin Hanzade Hanımsultan, the daughter of Selçuk Sultan (daughter of Bayezid II) and had a son, Ahmed Çelebi.
- Şahzade Aynişah Hanımsultan (died in 1570). She married Abdüsselâm Çelebi and had a daughter, Ümmihan Hanım.

== See also ==
- List of Ottoman governors of Egypt

Political offices
| Preceded by Çoban Mustafa Pasha | Ottoman Governor of Egypt; 1523–1524 | Succeeded by Güzelce Kasım Pasha |
Regnal titles
| New title Declared independence | Sultan of Egypt; 1523–1524 | Rebellion crushed |
