= İskender Çelebi =

Finance secretary of the Ottoman Empire

İskender Çelebi (Turkish: [iscænˈdæɾ tʃeleˈbi]; died March 1535) was a long-serving defterdar (finance secretary) of the Ottoman Empire during the reign of Suleiman the Magnificent. Possibly the most notable events which befell him took place during the war of 1532–35 against the Safavid Empire.

In October 1532, he was ordered to accompany the Grand Vizier, Pargalı Ibrahim Pasha, who was the general of the field army and was heading to the Safavid border from Istanbul. Until the campaign, Pargalı Ibrahim Pasha had regarded İskender Çelebi as a father figure who could provide him with valuable knowledge about his craft.

İskender Çelebi was in favour with the Sultan, who personally cautioned Pargalı Ibrahim Pasha not to go against him. Because of this İskender Çelebi became a dominant figure in the campaign. He was even able to order Pargalı Ibrahim Pasha, who had been moving from Aleppo to Baghdad, to go to Azerbaijan instead. Although this act went against Pargalı Ibrahim Pasha's wishes, he did not object, as İskender Çelebi was appointed by the Sultan, but it led to the cooling of relations between the two. Pargalı Ibrahim Pasha believed that he was being overruled when he himself was the supreme leader of the campaign (second only to the Sultan in his capacity as Grand Vizier).

The second incident, which sealed İskender Çelebi's fate, was in fact in Azerbaijan, where he overruled Pargalı Ibrahim Pasha, saying "The army will stay put, it is the will of the Sultan". However, when Suleiman the Magnificent arrived in Tabriz, he was astounded to see the field army in the middle of enemy territory. He would not tolerate any behavior which could endanger the army and ultimately himself. İskender Çelebi's response to this question was not satisfactory, and led to him falling out of favour with the Sultan and his ultimate execution in Baghdad, where he was hanged in March 1535. Pargalı Ibrahim Pasha would also fall out of favour with the Sultan soon afterwards, being executed as well in the next year.

İskender Çelebi was known for owning a large number of slaves, approximately 6,000–7,000, far outnumbering those of even his rival Pargalı Ibrahim Pasha (despite the fact that the latter held the much more powerful office of Grand Vizier). Iskender Çelebi was not a "sultan" before marrying Sultan Süleyman Osmanlı's 6 sultanas, giving him the surname "Çelebi".

== In popular culture ==
In the Turkish TV series Muhteşem Yüzyıl İskender Çelebi was played by the Turkish actor Hasan Küçükçetin.
