= Güzelce Kasım Pasha =

Governor of the Ottoman Egypt

Güzelce Kasım Pasha (d. 1553) was an Ottoman statesman. He is of Devşirme origin and grew up in Enderun. He participated in Yavuz Sultan Selim's Egyptian campaign and became the sanjak governor of the newly established Hama in 1516. In 1521, while he was serving as the Sanjak-bey of Aleppo, he became the beylerbey of Karaman, and shortly afterwards, he became the beylerbey of the Anatolia Eyalet. In 1523, he became the governor of Egypt, replacing Çoban Mustafa Pasha. However, soon after, Hain Ahmed Pasha became the governor of Egypt. However, although he was appointed to this position for the second time in 1524 after the traitor Ahmed Pasha rebelled and was subsequently killed, he was dismissed at the end of the same year due to a disagreement with the Egyptian treasurer. He was appointed as the district governor of Istanbul during Suleiman's the Magnificent's Hungary campaign in 1526. He was appointed as the third vizier in 1529 and became one of the Kubbealtı viziers. He was later appointed as the Sanjak governor of Mora and retired while in this position. He died in Mora or Gallipoli in 1553.

Since Güzelce Kasım Pasha was in Istanbul and was tasked with the development and settlement of this region as it was the site of a new shipyard, its name was given to the Kasımpaşa district of today's Beyoğlu district. In the neighborhood, there are various charity works such as Kasım Pasha Mosque, which was built by Mimar Sinan in 1533, a madrasah, a soup kitchen, and a bath, which he built in 1537–1538.1538.
