= Frenk DJ =

Italian DJ and music producer

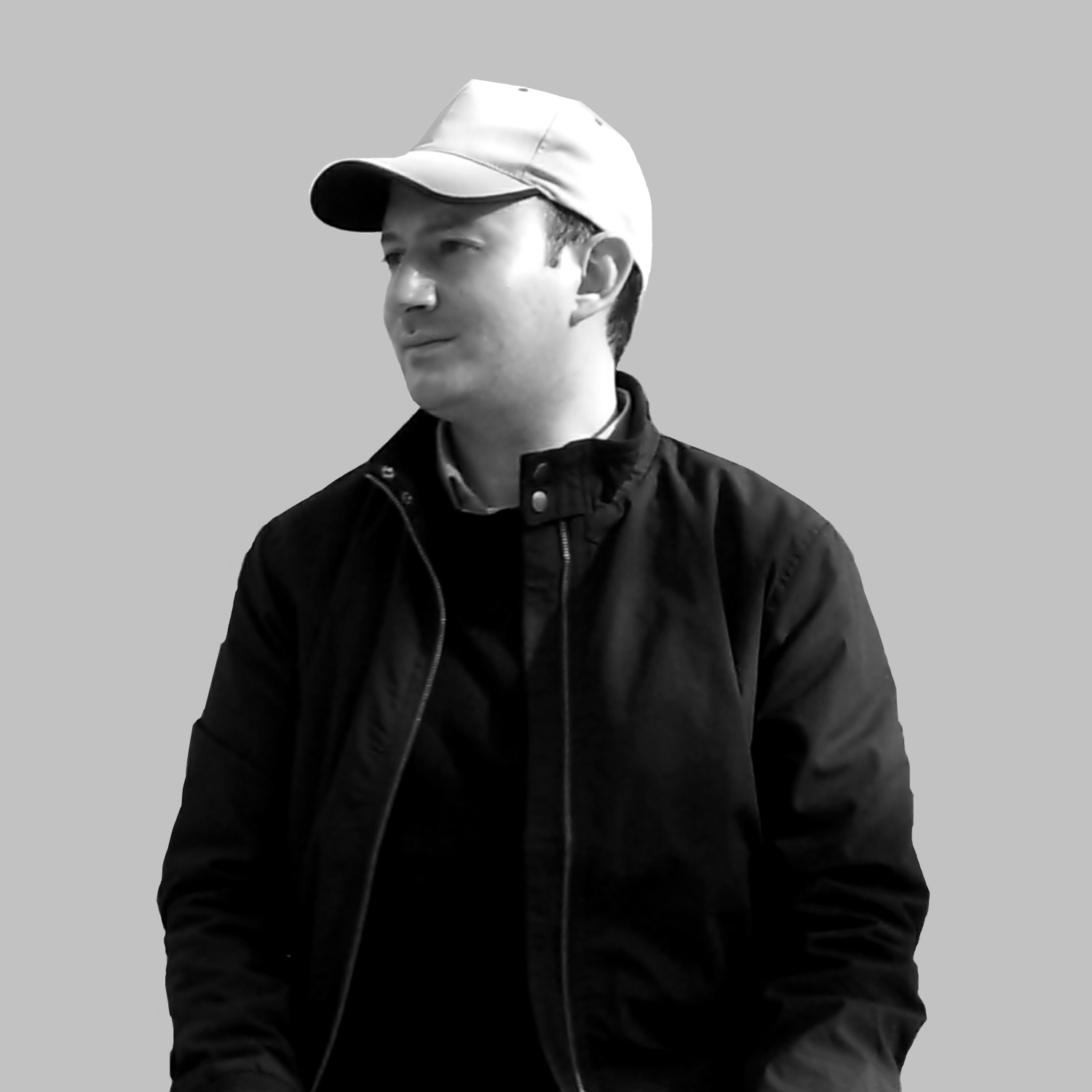

Background information
- Born: Messina, Italy
- Genres: House, Electro House
- Labels: FKJ Music Records, Clorophilla Records

Frenk DJ (born in Messina, Italy) is an Italian former disc jockey and music producer.

== Biography ==
Frenk DJ started in 2006 with the release of his first single "Real Forged", in collaboration with J.Dee, which was then broadcast for all the main dance radios in Europe.

In 2007, began to produce and develop music projects and continued his career as a DJ performing in several clubs in Messina, mainly as hobby.

In 2008 he produced two debut albums "Once I Get Up” and “Keep Your Hands Up”. He also participated with a remix for the 1976 song "Music" by John Miles in the context of the project “Midnight Express”, reinterpreted by the American singer Sabrina Johnston.

In 2009 he produced several musical pieces in collaboration with artist Joe Maker, for the reissue of the songs by Freddie Mercury "Living on My Own", Mike Oldfield, "Moonlight Shadow" and for the rock track by Blur "Song 2", whose version was licensed by EMI France to be included in the "I Love Ibiza" compilation. Moreover, both artists have collaborated with the Italian project "Itaka" for the song "Como Dice El DJ" on the record label Sunflower Records, follow-up of the EP "La Danza De Ibiza" released on vinyl. Under the pseudonym "Trinakria Bros", he signed a record contract for Nubit Records, with the song" Crazy Accordion", published on vinyl and licensed by Universal Music Greece for the "World Circus" compilation. In the same year, he contributed with Joe Maker to the single "Everybody Do Pop Music" by Kato with a version that was included in the dance compilation Hit Mania – Club Dance Vol.13, distributed by Warner Music Group and for a remix with Niky D. to the cover of the 1977 song "From Here To Eternity" by Giorgio Moroder.

In 2010 further projects were attained, including the remix featuring Marco Magrini of "Bang, Bang Bang!" by Soulstatic with the singer Wendy Lewis, and the remixes featuring Joe Maker of the 1979 song "Ring My Bell" by Anita Ward, which was released via Bacci Bros Records and included in a classic 2013 album of the artist: “The Very Best of Anita Ward” and for the great success Mina and Alberto Lupo "Parole parole", with the voices by Dr. Feelx and Linda D.

In 2011 he created a collection of remixes for the project "Joyful Noise" of the duo of voices Michelle Weeks & Dawn Tallman and for the release of "Music Change My Life" by Sugar Freak, with the singer Diva. In the same year he collaborated to the production of a remix with Joe Maker for the cover of Heavy Cross, by Gossip, and a funky version with Peter Toti for the 1976 track "Nice & Slow" by Jesse Green. In this period, he participated to the realization of two versions for the project "Move Your Body", a single released by 740 Boyz with the producer Funky Junction.

In 2012, together with Leee John, singer of the group Imagination, he collaborated to the production of two remixes of the 1972 song cover "Betcha By Golly, Wow", by The Stylistics.

The single "Secrets" by Imagination, is the project in which he took part in 2016 with artist Laurent Grant, for the release of a remix for the French company Cristal Publishing.

In 2017, he made a remix with Daniele Sorrenti of "Waves of Luv" with the voices of 2Black, a cover of the 1980 song "In Alto Mare" by Loredana Bertè.

In 2018, he collaborated as remixer to the project "Feel It" by Carol Jiani, cover of the 1999 hit by Nerio's Dubwork featuring Darryl Pandy and with Joe Maker to the project "Move Up & Down" by Miss Autumn Leaves, both released via Sounds United. In the same period, he participated with Niky D. to the realization of a new edition of the 1986 song "Big Time”, a success by English musician Peter Gabriel. Besides, he arranged the remix versions of two covers: "Careless Whisper" by George Michael, together artist Dave Pedrini, reinterpreted by the British singer Jason Prince with Rozalla voice and "Somewhere Over The Rainbow" by Tosch, famous ballad of 1939 sung by Judy Garland in the movie "The Wizard of Oz". He also contributed with Dave Pedrini to a version of the 1997 track "Mighty High" by Gloria Gaynor in collaboration with the American band The Trammps, released by Sheeva Records and to a dance remix of the song “Strike It Up”, with artist Eddie Feel, cover by Black Box of the 1991 hit reinterpreted by Felicia Uwaje, former vocalist of the dance group Bass Bumpers.

In 2020, he collaborated with artist Alex Patane’ to realization of two remixes published by Ibrida Records for the songs “Guess My Age” and “Motel Paris”, licensed under Blanco y Negro Music, the leading dance music record company in Spain. Moreover, he produced with Dave Pedrini a remix of the song “Higher” by Samiveli & Terri B! and has participated together Alex Patane' with two euro-dance projects of biggest singers of the 90s dance music: Corona and Regina, for the remix to the songs “Baby, I Don't Care” and “My History”, both included on the cd selection "Dance Traxx - 20 Chart Hits 2021” by DMN Records.

== Partial discography ==
=== Albums ===
- 2010 – "Trinakria (Remixes Gold Tracks)”
- 2009 – "Stop and Go (The Remixes)”
- 2008 – "Keep Your Hands Up”
- 2008 – "Once I Get Up”

=== Single and EP ===
- 2010 – "Self Control”
- 2009 – "Crazy Accordion”
- 2009 – "Once I Get Up (The Remake)”
- 2009 – "Haka Maori”
- 2009 – "Go Train”
- 2009 – "Keep Your Hands Up 2009”
- 2008 – "Push It”
- 2008 – "Klips EP”
- 2008 – "Make Yourself”
- 2008 – "Template EP”
- 2008 – "Relativity”
- 2007 – "On The Dancefloor”
- 2007 – "The Joy of Sex EP”
- 2007 – "Sex on the Beach EP”
- 2007 – "Get Ready”
- 2007 – "Exite EP”
- 2007 – "Shake It EP”
- 2007 – "Elektro Punk”
- 2007 – "Subconscious EP”
- 2007 – "Trusted Me”
- 2007 – "Shake It EP”
- 2007 – "Spanx”
- 2007 – "Little Drums EP”
- 2007 – "Revolution EP”
- 2007 – "Sexy Sound”
- 2007 – "Elektro Style”
- 2007 – "Electro Tears”
- 2007 – "Deja Vu”
- 2007 – "Shake That Bass”
- 2007 – "Let The Music Push It”
- 2007 – "The Traditional Future”
- 2006 – "Real Forged”

=== Remixes ===
- 2021 – “When The Sun”
- 2021 – “Italiana”
- 2020 – “My History”
- 2020 – “Baby, I Don't Care”
- 2020 – “Motel Paris”
- 2020 – “Guess My Age”
- 2020 – “In This World”
- 2020 – “Higher”
- 2019 – “Ibiza Bizarre”
- 2019 – “1984”
- 2019 – “Face-Book Girls”
- 2018 – “Strike It Up”
- 2018 – “Mighty High”
- 2018 – “Somewhere Over The Rainbow”
- 2018 – “Careless Whisper”
- 2018 – “Big Time”
- 2018 – “Move Up & Down”
- 2018 – “Feel It”
- 2017 – "Waves of Luv”
- 2016 – "Secrets”
- 2015 – "Hey DJ”
- 2015 – "Stay in Bed”
- 2014 – "Besame”
- 2013 – "La Bomba De Ibiza”
- 2012 – "Alegria”
- 2012 – "Just Say I Love You”
- 2012 – "Betcha By Golly, Wow”
- 2011 – "Nice & Slow"
- 2011 – "Welcome to mMy House”
- 2011 – "Life”
- 2011 – "Musix (All Versions)”
- 2011 – "Via Flamenca (The Remixes)”
- 2011 – "Music Change My Life (The Remixes)”
- 2011 – "Bang, Bang, Bang! (The Remixes)”
- 2011 – "La Danza De Ibiza – Remixes”
- 2011 – "Everybody's Dancing – Remixes”
- 2011 – "Summer Feeling (Miami Beach 2011)”
- 2011 – "Tiger”
- 2011 – "Music Change My Life (Remixes 2011)”
- 2011 – "Joyful Noise (Remixes 2011)”
- 2011 – "Move Your Body (The Remixes)”
- 2011 – "Heavy Cross”
- 2011 – "La Danza De Ibiza (Remix)”
- 2010 – "Be As One”
- 2010 – "Bang, Bang, Bang! (Remixes Part One)”
- 2010 – "Parole parole”
- 2010 – "Minimal Female”
- 2010 – "Ring My Bell”
- 2010 – "Break Me Down”
- 2010 – "Mean Sub”
- 2010 – "Summer Feeling”
- 2010 – "What's Up?”
- 2010 – "Via Flamenca”
- 2010 – "Life (Part One)”
- 2010 – "Impulsion”
- 2010 – "Stay With Me”
- 2009 – "Can You Hear Me”
- 2009 – "From Here To Eternity”
- 2009 – "We Need I Sign”
- 2009 – "Whenever You Go”
- 2009 – "Don't Believe It”
- 2009 – "Dirty Moment”
- 2009 – "Como Dice El DJ”
- 2009 – "Moonlight Shadow”
- 2009 – "The Violin”
- 2009 – "Red Light”
- 2009 – "Music (Remixes)”
- 2009 – "Santo Brasil”
- 2009 – "Da Da Da”
- 2009 – "I Wanna Be Your Lover”
- 2009 – "My Slave”
- 2009 – "Set Me Free”
- 2009 – "We Need A Sign”
- 2009 – "La Danza De Ibiza”
- 2009 – "Living on My Own”
- 2009 – "Song 2 Remixes”
- 2009 – "Dark Circle”
- 2009 – "Blue People”
- 2009 – "Everybody Do Pop Music”
- 2009 – "This Feeling”
- 2009 – "I See You”
- 2009 – "Typical Choice”
- 2009 – "Back For Good”
- 2009 – "Musix”
- 2009 – "Saxlab”
- 2009 – "Questo Folle Sentimento”
- 2008 – "Puta”
- 2008 – "Music”
- 2008 – "Moonlight Shadow”
- 2008 – "Sbomb”
- 2008 – "Sexy Machine”
- 2008 – "Fuck The Topless DJ”
- 2008 – "Whatever May Be”
- 2007 – "Distort Reality”
