= Celâlzâde Mustafa Çelebi =

Ottoman historian (1490–1567)

- Born: c. 1490; Tosya
- Died: 1567 (aged approx 77); Istanbul

Celâlzâde Mustafa Çelebi (c. 1490–1567) was an Ottoman historian and senior bureaucrat. His exact date of birth is unknown, but can be estimated based on information in his writings to be approximately 1490. He was born in Tosya. He was appointed as Reis ül-Küttab in 1524 or 1525; he then served as Nişancı from 1534 until 1557, and again from 1566 until his death. He died in Istanbul.

== Bibliography ==
- Şahin, Kaya (2013), "Celalzade Mustafa and the New Ottoman Empire in Early Modern Eurasia", Empire and Power in the Reign of Süleyman: Narrating the Sixteenth-Century Ottoman World, Cambridge Studies in Islamic Civilization, Cambridge: Cambridge University Press, pp. 14–154, doi:10.1017/cbo9781139540643.003, ISBN 978-1-139-54064-3
