= Solakzade Mehmed Hemdemi =

Ottoman Turkish historian and composer (1592–1658)

- Born: 1592; Constantinople (now Istanbul, Turkey)
- Died: 1658 (aged 65–66)
- Occupations: Historian, music composer, poet
- Notable work: Tarih-i Solakzade

Solakzade Mehmed (1592–1658), using the pen name Hemdemi, was an Ottoman historian and music composer. He wrote a famous Ottoman history titled Tarih-i Solakzade (History of Solakzade). He seems to have been the son of a Solak, a janissary bowman of the sultan's personal guard, and was born in Constantinople.
