= İlayda Alişan =

Turkish actress (born 1996)

- Born: 26 February 1996 (age 30); Istanbul, Turkey
- Occupation: Actress
- Years active: 2011–present

İlayda Alişan (born 26 February 1996) is a Turkish actress.

== Life and career ==
Alişan was born on 26 February 1996 in Istanbul. She is a graduate of Behçet Kemal Çağlar High School.

Her interest in acting began at a young age and she made her television debut in 2011 with a role in the Bir Çocuk Sevdim TV series. She continued her career with recurring roles in series such as Rüya, Bana Sevmeyi Anlat, Gönül Hırsızı, Benim Adım Gültepe and Serçe Sarayı. In 2017, Alişan was cast in the TV series Çukur, starring alongside Aras Bulut İynemli and Dilan Çiçek Deniz. In 2019, she joined the cast of Şampiyon.

Between 2019 and 2020, she had a recurring role in the Netflix original series Hakan: Muhafız. She then appeared in the Gain original series Terapist in 2021. In 2021, Alişan starred in the series Masumiyet and depicted the character of Ela, the show starred Hülya Avşar, Mehmet Aslantuğ and Deniz Çakır as leading characters. She also appeared as a guest on Kırmızı Oda with Erdem Şanlı.

In 2022, she played in the romantic comedy series Seversin opposite Burak Yörük. In 2023, she starred in İyi Adamın 10 Günü, a Netflix adaptation of a novel with the same title. In the same year, she began starring in the TV series Ateş Kuşları with Burak Tozkoparan, Erdem Şanlı.

== Filmography ==
Film
2023	İyi Adamın 10 Günü	Fatoş	Leading role
2023	Kötü Adamın 10 Günü	Fatoş	Guest appearance
Television
Year	Title	Role	Notes
2011	Bir Çocuk Sevdim	Merve	Supporting role
2013	Gönül Hırsızı	Harika	Supporting role
2014	Benim Adım Gültepe	Nurten	Supporting role
2015	Serçe Sarayı	Sinem	Supporting role
2016	Bana Sevmeyi Anlat	Eylül Eren	Supporting role
2017	Rüya	Cemre	Supporting role
2017–2019 / 2021	Çukur	Akşın Koçovalı	Supporting role
2019–2020	Şampiyon	Neslihan Günaltay	Supporting role
2021	Masumiyet	Ela Yüksel	Leading role
2021	Kırmızı Oda	Süveyda	Guest role
2022	Seversin	Asya Çelikbaş	Leading role
2023–2024	Ateş Kuşları	Gülayşe Ateş / Lara Eyüboğlu	Leading role
2025	Piyasa	Münevver Çetin	Leading role
2026	Evlilik Güzeldir	Yasemin Bahtiyar	Leading role
Streaming series
Year	Title	Role	Notes
2019–2020	Hakan: Muhafız	Aylin	Supporting role
2021	Terapist	Özlem Narin	Leading role
TBA	Ölüm Kime Yakışır		Leading role

== Awards and nominations ==
Year	Award	Category	Result	Ref.
2019	Karadeniz Technical University Media Awards	Rising Actress of the Year	Nominated	
2019	Turkey Youth Awards	Best Supporting TV Actress	Nominated	
2019	Inflow Award	Best Influencer	Won	
2020	46th Golden Butterfly Awards	Shining Star	Won	
