= Davud Pasha =

Davud Pasha or Davut Pasha or Dawud Pasha may refer to:

- Koca Davud Pasha (died 1498), Ottoman general and grand vizier
- Küçük Davut Pasha (fl. 1499), Ottoman grand admiral (Kapudan Pasha)
- Kara Davud Pasha (died 1623), Ottoman statesman and grand vizier
- Davud Pasha (governor of Egypt) (died 1549), Ottoman governor of Egypt
- Dawud Pasha of Baghdad (died 1851), the last Mamluk ruler of Iraq
- Garabet Artin Davoudian (died 1873), also known as Davud Pasha, Ottoman mutasarrif of Lebanon

== See also ==
- David (name)
- Pasha (title)
