= Muhteşem Yüzyıl =

Turkish historical fiction television series

- Also known as: Magnificent Century
- Written by: Meral Okay (1–2); Yılmaz Şahin (2–4)
- Directed by: Yagmur Taylan (1–3); Durul Taylan (1–3); Mert Baykal (4); Yağız Alp Akaydın (4)
- Starring: Halit Ergenç; Meryem Uzerli; Vahide Perçin; Okan Yalabık; Nebahat Çehre; Pelin Karahan; Nur Fettahoğlu; Selma Ergeç; Mehmet Günsür; Berrak Tüzünataç; Gürbey İleri; Ozan Güven; Engin Öztürk; Merve Boluğur; Tolga Sarıtaş; Aras Bulut İynemli; Deniz Çakır; Meltem Cumbul; Tuncel Kurtiz; Burak Özçivit; Selim Bayraktar; Filiz Ahmet; Sarp Akkaya; Serkan Altunorak
- Composers: Fahir Atakoğlu; Aytekin Ataş; Soner Akalin
- Country of origin: Turkey
- Original language: Turkish
- No. of seasons: 4
- No. of episodes: 139 (list of episodes)

Production
- Producer: Timur Savci
- Running time: 90-150 min.
- Production company: Tims Productions

Original release
- Network: Show TV (2011); Star TV (2012–2014)
- Release: January 5, 2011 – June 11, 2014

Related
- Muhteşem Yüzyıl: Kösem

Muhteşem Yüzyıl (Turkish pronunciation: [muhteˈʃem ˈjyzjɯl], lit. 'The Magnificent Century') is a Turkish historical drama series. Written by Meral Okay and Yılmaz Şahin, it is based on the life of Ottoman Sultan Suleiman the Magnificent, the longest-reigning Sultan of the Ottoman Empire, and Hürrem Sultan, a slave girl who became his wife. It also sheds light on the era known as the Sultanate of Women. It was originally broadcast on Show TV and then transferred to Star TV.

== Plot ==
The series follows the reign of Suleiman the Magnificent, the most renowned ruler of the Ottoman Empire. As his power and influence spread and grew, it impacted him and those within the imperial household: his friend and advisor, Pargalı Ibrahim Pasha; his mother, Hafsa Sultan, the first Valide sultan; his sister, Hatice Sultan; Mahidevran Sultan, the mother of Suleiman's eldest son; and Hürrem Sultan, the Haseki sultan of Suleiman.

== Production ==
The series was directed by The Taylan Brothers and produced by Timur Savcı, Turkish cinema, TV series and film producer. The series cost a total of 130 million Turkish liras, making it the most expensive project on Turkish television.

A 2,100 square-meter plateau was created for the production work that began 5 months before the first broadcast date, and a group of 30 sculptors and painters built exact replicas of the structures there.

== Series overview ==
Season	Episodes	Originally released			Rating	Rank
Season	Episodes	First released	Last released	Network	Rating	Rank
1	24	January 5, 2011	June 22, 2011	Show TV	15.76	1
2	39	September 14, 2011	June 6, 2012	Show TV/Star TV	14.20	1
3	40	September 12, 2012	June 19, 2013	Star TV	13.70	1
4	36	September 18, 2013	June 11, 2014	Star TV	12.06	1

== Characters ==
=== The Imperial Family ===
Actor name	Role name	Explanation	Character status
Halit Ergenç	Suleiman the Magnificent	The 10th Sultan of the Ottoman Empire, son of Selim I and Hafsa sultan	Major
Meryem Uzerli	Hürrem Sultan	Haseki Sultan of the Ottoman Empire and legal wife of Sultan Suleiman, mother of the Sultan's five younger children	Major
Vahide Perçin	Hürrem Sultan	Haseki Sultan of the Ottoman Empire and legal wife of Sultan Suleiman, mother of the Sultan's five younger children	Major
Nebahat Çehre	Hafsa Sultan	Valide Sultan of the Ottoman Empire and mother of Sultan Suleiman, head of the Ottoman Imperial Harem	Major
Okan Yalabık	Pargalı Ibrahim Pasha	Grand Vizier of the Ottoman Empire, Sultan Suleiman's best friend, Hatice Sultan's husband	Major
Okan Yalabık	Pargalı Ibrahim Pasha	Grand Vizier of the Ottoman Empire, Sultan Suleiman's best friend, Hatice Sultan's husband	Voice only
Nur Fettahoğlu	Mahidevran Sultan	Sultan Suleiman's consort and the mother of Şehzade Mustafa	Major
Selma Ergeç	Hatice Sultan	Sultan Suleiman's sister, daughter of Sultan Selim I, wife of Ibrahim Pasha and mother of his children.	Major
Yusuf Berkan Demirbağ	Şehzade Mustafa	Son of Sultan Suleiman and Mahidevran Sultan, first heir to the throne	Supporting
Tunç Oral	Şehzade Mustafa	Son of Sultan Suleiman and Mahidevran Sultan, first heir to the throne	Supporting
Mehmet Günsür	Şehzade Mustafa	Son of Sultan Suleiman and Mahidevran Sultan, first heir to the throne	Major
Ayda Acar	Mihrimah Sultan	Sultan Suleiman and Hürrem Sultan's only daughter and second child, wife of Rüstem Pasha	Supporting
Melis Mutluç	Mihrimah Sultan	Sultan Suleiman and Hürrem Sultan's only daughter and second child, wife of Rüstem Pasha	Supporting
Pelin Karahan	Mihrimah Sultan	Sultan Suleiman and Hürrem Sultan's only daughter and second child, wife of Rüstem Pasha	Major
Arda Anarat	Şehzade Mehmed	Sultan Suleiman and Hürrem Sultan's oldest child	Supporting
Gürbey İleri	Şehzade Mehmed	Sultan Suleiman and Hürrem Sultan's oldest child	Major
Ozan Güven	Rüstem Pasha	Mihrimah Sultan's husband and Grand Vizier of the Ottoman Empire	Major
Yiğit Üst	Şehzade Selim	Sultan Suleiman and Hürrem Sultan's third child and the 11th Sultan of the Ottoman Empire, father of Şehzade Murad	Supporting
Engin Öztürk	Şehzade Selim	Sultan Suleiman and Hürrem Sultan's third child and the 11th Sultan of the Ottoman Empire, father of Şehzade Murad	Major
Merve Boluğur	Nurbanu Sultan	Şehzade Selim's concubine, mother of Şehzade Murad	Major
Erhan Can Kartal	Şehzade Bayezid	Sultan Suleiman and Hürrem Sultan's fourth child	Supporting
Aras Bulut İynemli	Şehzade Bayezid	Sultan Suleiman and Hürrem Sultan's fourth child	Major
Mina Tuana Güneş	Huricihan Sultan	Hatice Sultan and Ibrahim Pasha's daughter, Bayezid's cousin and legal wife	Supporting
Burcu Özberk	Huricihan Sultan	Hatice Sultan and Ibrahim Pasha's daughter, Bayezid's cousin and legal wife	Major
Aybars Kartal Özson	Şehzade Cihangir	Sultan Suleiman and Hürrem Sultan's fifth and last child	Supporting
Tolga Sarıtaş	Şehzade Cihangir	Sultan Suleiman and Hürrem Sultan's fifth and last child	Major
Berrak Tüzünataç	Mihrünnisa Sultan	Şehzade Mustafa's legal wife and mother of his son Şehzade Mehmed, daughter of Hizir Hayreddin Pasha	Major
Deniz Çakır	Şah Sultan	Sultan Suleiman's sister, Lütfi Pasha's wife, Esmahan Sultan's mother	Major
Mehmet Özgür	Lütfi Pasha	Husband of Şah Sultan, later Grand Vizier of the Ottoman Empire after the death of Ayas Pasha, Esmahan Sultan's father	Major
Meltem Cumbul	Fatma Sultan	Sultan Suleiman's sister, Kara Ahmed Pasha's wife	Major
Selen Öztürk	Gülfem Hatun	Sultan Suleiman's first consort and mother of his first child, Hatice Sultan's confidant, chief treasurer of the Harem	Supporting
Pınar Çağlar Gençtürk	Beyhan Sultan	Sultan Suleiman's sister, Ferhad Pasha's wife	Supporting
Gökhan Çelebi	Ferhad Pasha	Beyhan Sultan's husband, executed due to treason	Supporting
Kıvanç Kılınç	Ferhad Pasha	Beyhan Sultan's husband, executed due to treason	Supporting
Luran Ahmeti	Divane Hüsrev Pasha	Second-in-command Vizier, Hatice Sultan's third husband	Supporting
Gonca Sarıyildiz	Fatma Hatun	Maid to Valide Sultan, then Mahidevran Sultan, later Şehzade Mustafa's concubine, mother of his son Şehzade Suleiman	Supporting
Ecem Çalık	Esmehan Sultan	Şah Sultan and Lütfi Pasha's daughter	Supporting
Efe Mehmet Güneş	Sultanzade Osman	Hatice Sultan and İbrahim Pasha's son	Supporting
Serenay Aktaş	Ayşe Hatun	Şehzade Mustafa's concubine and mother of his daughter Nergisşah Sultan	Supporting
Yetkin Dikinciler	Kara Ahmed Pasha	Fatma Sultan's husband and later Grand Vizier of the Ottoman Empire	Supporting
Yasemin Allen	Defne Sultan	Şehzade Bayezid's consort and mother of Şehzade Mehmed	Supporting
Alize Gördüm	Nergisşah Sultan	Şehzade Mustafa's daughter	Supporting
Serhan Onat	Şehzade Murad	Şehzade Selim and Nurbanu Sultan's son	Supporting
Koray Efe Yazgan	Şehzade Orhan	Şehzade Bayezid's eldest son	Supporting
Özge Gürel	Rana Sultan	Şehzade Bayezid's concubine and mother of the majority of his children	Supporting
Almeda Abazi	Nazenin Hatun (Valeria)	Sultan Suleiman's concubine, Raziye Sultan's mother, Nurbanu Sultan's former servant.	Supporting
Gözde Türker	Safiye Hatun	Şehzade Murad's concubine, later mother of Mehmed III	Guest appearance

=== Statesmen and palace officials ===
Actor name	Role name	Explanation	Depiction		Character status
Actor name	Role name	Explanation	In series	In real life person	Character status
Burak Özçivit	Malkoçoğlu Bali Bey	An Ottoman military commander and a keeper of Sultan's privy chamber, in love with Aybige Hatun, Mihrimah's love interest			Major
Tuncel Kurtiz	Ebussuud Efendi	Kadı (judge) of Istanbul, later Şhaykh al-Islām (supreme religious leader of the Ottoman Empire)			Major
Tolga Tekin	Barbarossa Hayreddin Pasha	Grand Admiral of the Ottoman Empire and the Kapudan Pasha (commander-in-chief of the Ottoman Navy), Mustafa's supporter, Mihrünnisa's father			Major
Yıldırım Fikret Urağ	Sokollu Mehmed Pasha	Grand Vizier of the Ottoman Empire after Semiz Ali Pasha. Husband of Ismihan Sultan			Major
Hasan Küçükçetin	İskender Çelebi	Ottoman finance minister renowned for his wealth, an enemy of İbrahim Pasha			Major
Fehmi Karaarslan	Ayas Pasha	The vizier for the council, later the Grand Vizier of the Ottoman Empire after the execution of Ibrahim Pasha			Supporting
İbrahim Raci Öksüz	Hadım Suleiman Pasha	Grand Vizier of the Ottoman Empire after the banishment of Lütfi Pasha			Supporting
Fatih Dokgöz	Semiz Ali Pasha	Şehzade Bayezid's supporter, commander of the Janissary Corps, later a third-in-command vizier and finally the Grand Vizier following Rüstem Pasha's death			Supporting
Arif Erkin Güzelbeyoğlu	Piri Mehmed Pasha	Grand Vizier of the Ottoman Empire before Pargalı Ibrahim Pasha			Supporting
Murat Şahan	Mustafa Pasha	Fatma Sultan's first husband. Governor of Antakya.	A heterosexual man, married Fatma Sultan twice.	A homosexual man. Never remarried with Fatma. The death information of Mustafa Pasha is unknown.	Supporting
Serdar Orçin	Sinan Pasha	An admiral of the Ottoman Empire as a Commander in Chief of the Navy, Rüstem Pasha's brother			Supporting
Murat Tüzün	Hain Ahmed Pasha	An Ottoman governor and statesman, rival to Ibrahim Pasha, executed due to treason			Supporting
Gürkan Uygun	Mimar Sinan	Chief architect of Sultan Suleiman			Supporting
Adnan Koç	Behram Pasha	A vizier at the court, Ibrahim's enemy		Fictional.	Supporting
Tansel Öngel	Alvise Gritti	A Venetian politician influential in the Hungarian Kingdom and regent of Hungary from 1530 to 1534			Supporting
Erman Saban	Alvise Gritti	A Venetian politician influential in the Hungarian Kingdom and regent of Hungary from 1530 to 1534			Supporting
Ozan Dağgez	Mehmet Çelebi	Şehzade Mustafa's tutor, Piri Mehmed Pasha's son, Hatice Sultan's fiancé		Fictional.	Supporting
Altan Gördüm	Bekir Ağa	An Ottoman official who was executed under Mustafa's order in Manisa on charges of bribery and incitement		Fictional.	Guest appearance

=== Palace servants and concubines ===
The information of the servants and concubines are little known. Most of the characters are fictional.

Actor name	Role name	Explanation	Character status
Selim Bayraktar	Sümbül Ağa	Chief eunuch of the harem and Hafsa Sultan's confidant after daye hatun and Hürrem Sultan's closest confidant, later Mihrimah Sultan's adviser	Major
Filiz Ahmet	Nigar Kalfa	Servant and apprentice in the harem later chief treasurer, first wife of Rustem Pasha, İbrahim's lover and confidant and mother of his daughter Esmanur	Major
Sema Keçik	Daye Hatun	Valide Sultan's maid and chief treasurer of the harem, Sultan Suleiman's nanny	Supporting
Sabina Toziya	Afife Hatun	Chief treasurer and leading servant of the harem, Yahya Efendi's mother and Sultan Suleiman's wet nurse	Supporting
Engin Günaydın	Gül Ağa	Eunuch that clarifies the harem prohibitions in the first episode, later Hürrem Sultan's confidant	Supporting
Nihan Büyükağaç	Gülşah Hatun	Mahidevran Sultan's maid, later Hürrem Sultan's maid	Supporting
Saadet Aksoy	Viktoria (Sadıka Hatun)	A Hungarian countess and spy for king King Lajos. An enemy of Sultan Suleiman	Supporting
Burcü Güner	Fahriye Kalfa (Diana)	Mahidevran Sultan's maid, later Hürrem Sultan's maid	Supporting
Gamze Dar	Fidan Hatun	Hürrem Sultan's servant, later Mahidevran Sultan's maid	Supporting
Melike İpek Yalova	Isabella Fortuna	Princess of Castille, in love with Suleiman. Not related to any real life person, although 2 women with similar name existed during the era: Isabel of Braganza, Duchess of Guimarães and Isabella of Portugal	Supporting
Cansu Dere	Firuze Hatun (Hümeyra)	Persian Safavid spy who poses as an Assyrian slave, Sultan Suleiman's concubine	Supporting
Saygın Soysal	Mercan Ağa	Şah Sultan's confidant	Supporting
Kübra Kip	Canfeda Hatun	Nurbanu Sultan's servant and confidant	Supporting
Cavit Çetin Güner	Gazanfer Ağa	Chief eunuch of the Manisa harem, in service of Nurbanu Sultan	Supporting
Yüksel Ünal	Şeker Ağa	Main chef of the palace kitchen	Supporting
Hayal Köseoğlu	Nilüfer Hatun	Hürrem Sultan's servant	Supporting
Burcu Tuna	Gülnihal Hatun (Maria)	Hürrem Sultan's childhood friend and servant	Supporting
Gökhan Tercanlı	Perçem Ağa	A guardian of the palace in service of Hürrem Sultan	Supporting
Melisa Sözen	Efsun Hatun (Nora)	Hürrem Sultan's servant, in love with Şehzade Mustafa	Major
Sebahat Kumaş	Esma Hatun	Hürrem Sultan's servant	Supporting
Seda Arslan	Nazlı Hatun	Hürrem Sultan's servant	Supporting
Kaya Akkaya	Lokman Ağa	A servant in Constantinople and later Kütahya harem, later a keeper of Sultan's privy chamber, in service of Hürrem Sultan	Supporting
Ünal Yeter	Kiraz Ağa	Afife Hatun's servant	Supporting
Suat Karausta	Zal Mahmut	Loyal servant of Rüstem Pasha	Supporting
Safak Baskaya	Ferhat Ağa	A keeper of Sultan's privy chamber	Supporting
Merve Oflaz	Ayşe Hatun	Sultan Suleiman's concubine, rival to Hürrem Sultan	Supporting
Elif Atakan	Rümeysa Hatun	Şehzade Mustafa's concubine	Supporting
Büşra Ayaydın	Rümeysa Hatun	Şehzade Mustafa's concubine	Supporting
Cemre Ebuzziya	Helena Hatun	Şehzade Mustafa's concubine	Supporting
Reyhan Taşören	Dilşah Hatun	Şehzade Selim's concubine, rival to Nurbanu Sultan	Supporting
İrem Helvacıoğlu	Nurbahar Hatun (Clara)	Şehzade Mehmed's concubine	Supporting
Patrycja Widłak	Cihan Hatun	Şehzade Mehmed's concubine	Guest appearance

=== Others ===
Most of the characters are fictional/fictionalized.

Actor name	Role name	Explanation	Character status
Serkan Altunorak	Taşlıcalı Yahya Bey	One of the famous poets of the era, Friend and supporter of Şehzade Mustafa	Major
Sarp Akkaya	Turahanoğlu Turgul Bey "Atmaca"	Friend and supporter of Şehzade Mustafa and then Şehzade Bayezid	Major
Ezgi Eyüboğlu	Aybige Hatun	Fictional niece of Valide Sultan. A Tatar Princess (daughter of the Crimean Khan), Balı Bey's love interest.	Supporting
Fatih Al	Matrakçı Nasuh Efendi	Mathematician, historian, geographer, miniaturist, and inventor, Ibrahim's confidant	Major
Gökhan Alkan	Tahmasp I	The 2nd Shah of the Safavid dynasty	Supporting
Sermet Yeşil	Tahmasp I	The 2nd Shah of the Safavid dynasty	Supporting
Hamdi Alkan	Yahya Efendi	An Ottoman Islamic scholar, Sufi and poet, Afife Hatun's son, Sultan Suleiman's foster-brother	Supporting
Hilmi Cem İntepe	Yavuz	A supporter of Şehzade Mustafa, serves Piri Reis together with Atmaca	Supporting
Alp Öyken	Pope Clement VII	Pope of the Roman Catholic Church during that time	Supporting
Seçkin Özdemir	Leopold "Leo"	A Ukrainian painter, Alexandra/Hurrem's former fiancé	Supporting
Burak Sağyaşar	Hekim Pedro	A physician who cures Mihrimah's illness and later falls in love with her	Supporting
Müjde Uzman	Armin Hatun	Joşua Effendi's daughter, a Jewish girl who falls in love with Bali Bey	Supporting
Güner Özkul	Rakel Hatun	A wealthy Jewish woman who lends the palace money in time of need	Supporting
Çağkan Çulha	İlyas	A soldier in service of Şehzade Mehmed who poisons him and causes his death	Supporting
Dolunay Soysert	Gracia Mendes Nasi	A wealthy Jewish woman who became a prominent figure in the politics of the Ottoman Empire	Supporting
Bergüzar Korel	Monica Gritti	Alvise Gritti's sister	Guest appearance
Binnur Kaya	Muskacı Hatun	A witch who writes amulets	Guest appearance
Hümeyra	Remmal Elmas	A famous astrologer who can tell the future by looking into the sands	Guest appearance
Mesut Özkeçeci	Sahib I Giray	Valide Sultan's brother and Aybige Hatun's father. He is the Crimean Khan and Suleyman's uncle	Guest appearance
Demir Demirkan	Deli Sabit	Head of the military unit called Deliler in the Battle of Mohács	Guest appearance
Büşra Pekin	Şirin Hatun	A woman who brings fabrics to the harem	Guest appearance
Burak Demir	Hüseyin Çavuş	Jannissary soldier loyal to Prince Mustafa	Supporting

== Broadcast ==
Country	Local title	Network	Premiere date	Timeslot
Turkey	Muhteşem Yüzyıl	Show TV (Season 1–2) Star TV (Season 2–4)	January 5, 2011	20:00
Northern Cyprus	Muhteşem Yüzyıl	Show TV (Season 1–2); Star TV (Season 2–4)	January 5, 2011	20:00
Arab League	حريم السلطان; Hareem Elsultan	OSN Ya Hala (Pay-per-view)	December 13, 2011	
Arab League	حريم السلطان; Hareem Elsultan	Dubai One	December 13, 2011	
Afghanistan	حرم سلطان; Hurrem Sultan	1TV	August 2012	
Albania	Sulejmani i Madhërishëm	TV Klan	22 January 2020	18:20
Algeria	حريم السلطان (Ḥarīm as-Sulṭān)	Echourouk TV		
Algeria	Muhteşem Yüzyıl	DTV	2015	
Argentina	El sultán	Telefe	April 24, 2017	
Azerbaijan	Möhtəşəm əsr	Lider TV	December 2011	20:10
Bangladesh	সুলতান সুলেমান; Sultan Suleiman	Deepto TV	December 16, 2015	19:30
Bolivia	Suleimán El Sultán	Bolivisión	March 13, 2017	22:00
Bosnia and Herzegovina	Sulejman Veličanstveni	Televizija OBN	August 22, 2012	20:00
Bulgaria	Великолепният век Velikolepniyat vek	TV7; Diema Family	September 7, 2012; August 29, 2015	20:30; 16:00
Chile	El Sultán	Canal 13	December 14, 2014	23:00
Colombia	El Sultán	Canal 1	September 10, 2018	22:00
Croatia	Sulejman veličanstveni	RTL Televizija	August 22, 2012	19:00
Cyprus		Extra	September, 2012	21:30
Czech Republic	Velkolepé století	TV Barrandov	December 17, 2011	20:00
Egypt		Al Hayat TV	November, 2011	
Egypt		MBC Masr	2014	
Estonia	Sajandi armastus	Kanal 2	September 1, 2013	20:35
Greece	Σουλεϊμάν ο Μεγαλοπρεπής; Souleiman o Megaloprepis	ANT1	August 28, 2012 (Season 1, 2 3a); October 21, 2013 (Season 3b); June 10, 2014 (Season 4)	21:30 (Season 1,2,3); 22:15 (Season 4)
Georgia	დიდებული საუკუნე	Maestro TV	September, 2013	21:45
Hungary	Szulejmán	RTL Klub	January 4, 2013	21:30
Indonesia	Abad Kejayaan/King Suleiman	antv	December 22, 2014	22:00
Indonesia	Abad Kejayaan/King Suleiman	antv	June 10, 2024; July 10, 2024; July 22, 2024	21:30; 23:30; 23:00
Iran	حريم سلطان; Hareem-e soltan	GEM TV	September, 2012	22:00
Israel	הסולטאן; HaSultan	Israel Plus	December 2013	19:00
Italy	Il secolo Magnifico	Babel TV	June, 2013	
Japan	オスマン帝国外伝～愛と欲望のハレム〜	Channel Ginga	August 7, 2017	0:00, 16:30
Kazakhstan	Сүлеймен сұлтан	Хабар Astana TV	March 15, 2012 / May 6, 2020	21:00
Kosovo	Sulltani: Shekulli Madhështor	RTV21	January, 2012	20:00
Kyrgyzstan	Даңазалуу доор	KTRK	March 15, 2012	
Lithuania	Didingasis amžius	LNK	September 7, 2013	15:00
Latvia	Lieliskais gadsimts	LNT	September 17, 2016	21:05
Macedonia	Величествениот султан	Kanal 5	December 12, 2011	21:00
Malaysia	Magnificent Century	Astro Bella HD Astro Mustika HD (Season 1–2) Astro Ria PRIMEtime (Season 3–4)	December 4, 2017	23:00 (Season 1–2) 19:00 (Season 3) 14:00 (Season 4)
Mexico	El Sultán	Imagen Television	April 3, 2017	21:00
Morocco		Medi 1 TV	December 2011	
Mongolia	Аугаа зуун	Edutainment TV	April 2019	22:00
Montenegro	Sulejman Veličanstveni	Prva TV; RTCG	March, 2012; October 11, 2013	20:00; 20:05
Nicaragua	El Sultán	Canal 10	May 1, 2017	20:00; 21:00
Pakistan	میرا سُلطان; Mera Sultan	Geo Kahani	May 10, 2013	21:00
Pakistan	حورم اور سُلطان; Hürrem Aur Sultan	ATV	2017	20:00
Panama	El Sultán	TVN	November 9, 2015	20:00
Peru	El Sultán	ATV	February 15, 2016	21:00
Poland	Wspaniałe stulecie	TVP1	October 6, 2014	15:45
Romania	Suleyman Magnificul: Sub domnia iubirii	Kanal D Romania	September 12, 2012	20:00
Russia	Великолепный век	Domashny	January 9, 2012	21:00
Serbia	Сулејман Величанствени; Sulejman Veličanstveni	Prva; B92; Nova.rs; Pink	February 9, 2012; September 1, 2013; December 17, 2013; September 19, 2014	20:20; 19:05; 20:00; 20:00
Slovakia	Sultán	TV Doma	December 15, 2011	20:30
Slovenia	Sulejman Veličastni	Planet TV	March 5, 2013	12:50
South Korea	위대한 세기	Welike	July 8, 2019	23:20
Spain	El Sultán	nova.atresmedia.com	June 13, 2022	21:30
Tanzania	Sultan	azam two	April 16, 2018	22:00
Thailand	สุไลมาน สุลต่านผู้เกรียงไกร	Channel 3 SD	August 6, 2018	20.30
Tunisia	حريم السلطان; Hareem Elsultan	Nessma TV	April, 2013	20:45
Uzbekistan	Muhtasham yuz yil	Milliy TV	December 10, 2018	21:00
Ukraine	Величне століття: Роксолана	1+1	October 8, 2012	17:10
United States	Suleimán - El Gran sultán	MundoMax	July 1, 2014	20:00
Vietnam	Thời đại hoàng kim - The Golden Age	HTV7	February 4, 2015	11:00

== Reception ==
=== Controversy ===
The show generated controversy and complaints from some viewers, for what they referred to as a "disrespectful", "indecent" and "hedonistic" portrayal of the historical sultan. Turkey's Radio and Television Supreme Council, known as RTÜK, claimed they had received over 70,000 complaints about the show and warned Show TV to publicly apologise for wrongly exposing "the privacy of a historical person". The Prime Minister Recep Tayyip Erdoğan condemned the show as "an effort to show our history in a negative light to the younger generations." An MP for the governing Justice and Development Party, Oktay Saral, went further, threatening to outlaw the "misrepresentation of historical figures" in shows such as Muhteşem Yüzyıl. Small groups of Islamists and Nationalists protested against the studio but the show remains successful with consistently high ratings.

Elif Batuman wrote in The New Yorker:

"On the surface, 'Magnificent Century' looks like a quintessential product of the Erdoğan years. Thanks to Erdoğan's economic policies, Turkey has a thriving television industry, capable of staging elaborate period dramas, and a prosperous family-oriented middle class of observant Muslims eager to watch their own values reflected in a historical imperial setting. And, much as Erdoğan's foreign policy has promoted relations with former Ottoman lands, the show has conquered large audiences in Balkan, Caucasian, and Arab countries not known for their fond memory of Ottoman rule. Broadcast to more than two hundred million viewers in fifty-two countries, "Magnificent Century" has accomplished one of Erdoğan's main goals: Making a powerful, non-secularist, globally involved version of Turkey both plausible and appealing.... And yet Erdoğan is not a fan. In late 2012, at the opening of a provincial airport he took a moment to condemn the show's depiction of Suleiman, as well as its directors and broadcasters, hinting at severe judicial repercussions."

According to the report of USA government funded Radio Free Asia, some Uyghur people were arrested for watching the series in 2020, as the Chinese government considered that it might encourage the thought of the Xinjiang Independence.

=== Anachronisms ===
Notable writers and critics pointed out multiple chronological mistakes in various scenes related to the timeline in which the plot takes place (1520–1566). Some of these anachronisms (or chronological inconsistencies) are as follows:

- Pargalı Ibrahim Pasha is shown, in many scenes, as he is working on a table. The practice of using tables in Ottoman palaces, however, was not adopted until the era of Abdulmejid I (1823–1861).
- Louis II, the King of Hungary, is portrayed in the series as an old man who provokes the Ottoman Empire by executing the Ottoman envoy. The problem with this portrayal is that Louis II never executed anyone, and he was only 20 years old when he died during the Battle of Mohács.
- In one of the episodes of the show, Sultan Suleiman recites the following Turkish phrase: "Nush ile yola gelmeyeni etmeli tekdir, tekdir ile uslanmayanın hakkı kötektir." This phrase comes from the Terkîb-i Bend of Ziya Pasha, which was only written in 1870, almost 400 years after Suleiman's reign.
- One of the workers in the kitchen is shown as she is dicing tomatoes. However, tomatoes became a part of the Ottoman cuisine only after 1835, after European contact with and colonization of the Americas.
- In the scene where Suleiman the Magnificent visits his son Şehzade Mustafa in the Manisa Palace, it can be seen that the floor is covered with parquet. However, parquet (parquet de menuiserie) was first used in 1684 on the floors of Palace of Versailles.

=== International popularity ===
Muhteşem Yüzyıl is reported to have an international audience of 200 million viewers in over 50 countries.

The show is part of an ongoing revival of Turkish culture in the Balkans through imported TV shows from Turkey, such as Öyle Bir Geçer Zaman Ki ("As time goes by", number one TV show in North Macedonia), or Fatmagül'ün Suçu Ne? ("What is Fatmagül's fault"), which was top ranked TV show in Kosovo 2012. Serbian sociologist Ratko Bozovic explains the popularity by pointing at the traditional, patriarchal values of the Turkish shows, and the many cultural and linguistic similarities between Turkey and the Balkan countries: "The mentality depicted in those shows has to do with a traditional understanding of morality that people in Serbia remember at some level." According to Bozovic, all Balkan countries have seen dramatic changes in terms of family life, and the Turkish shows help them recall value systems that now seem lost.

In Bangladesh, the show was known as সুলতান সুলেমান (Sultan Suleiman) and it was broadcast on Deepto TV, dubbed in Bangla. Within the first two months of its release in Bangladesh back in 2015, Sultan Suleiman received the highest TV program ratings in Bangladesh. The channel gained the most TRP ratings. Some people demanded a ban on this serial as viewers lacked interests in watching local dramas, however, keeping all these controversies aside the show still went on. After finishing the series, Deepto TV re-broadcast this massively popular show from June 2, 2019.

In Morocco, the series is called Harim al-Sultan ("The Sultan's Harem"). Many people find it visually and aesthetically enjoyable to watch, but viewers have contrasting opinions of the show's depictions of gender and Ottoman rulers. Many Moroccans stopped watching the show because they did not like the morals it presented.

In Greece, the series has become quite popular for people of all socioeconomic backgrounds and ages. Many Greek viewers enjoyed the visuals and oriental decorations present in the show, as well as the cultural proximity and historical ties between the two countries. It has become so popular that Bishop Anthimos of Thessaloniki and the Golden Dawn party condemned the show and urged Greeks not to watch it. "No one should watch Muhteşem Yüzyıl, The Magnificent Century," Anthimos said. He added, "By watching the Turkish series we are telling them we have surrendered."

In North Macedonia, the high popularity of Turkish TV series caused concerns about Turkish impact on Macedonian society, prompting the parliament to pass legislation in 2012 to require an increase in airtime for domestic productions.

In Chile where the series is called El Sultán (The Sultan) it is aired since December 14 in Canal 13 on prime time with great success. The Spanish voice of Suleiman is the same as the one of Onur in the Turkish soap opera Las mil y una noches. The series is part of a wave of Turkish soap operas that have become popular in Chilean TV. The series debuted right after the penultimate chapter of Los 80, a popular historical family drama produced by Canal 13.

In Pakistan, the show was named میرا سلطان: داستان جلال و جمال (Mera Sultan: Dastan-e-Jalal-o-Jamal; lit. My Emperor: Story of Bravery and Love) and it aired on channel Geo Kahani. Geo Kahani claims that it was the channel's most popular show and received the highest TRPs. The Pakistani drama industry was adversely affected by the popularity of Turkish dramas, and led actor Halit Ergenç to win first ever International Icon Award in Pakistan's biggest awards show Lux Style Awards in 2017.

== See also ==
- List of Muhteşem Yüzyıl episodes
- Muhteşem Yüzyıl: Kösem
- Al-Siyasa al-Shar'iyya fi Islah al-Ra'i wa al-Ra'iyya
- Payitaht: Abdülhamid
- Jewel in the Palace
- Diriliş: Ertuğrul
- Kingdoms of Fire
- Omar (TV series)
- Muhammad: The Final Legacy
- The Message (1976 film)
- List of Islam-related films
- Maslaha
- Bidah
- Sīrah
