= Tolga Güleç =

Turkish actor

- Born: 20 September 1981 (age 44); İskenderun, Turkey
- Education: Çukurova University (left); Dokuz Eylül University
- Spouse: Yeliz Şar (m. 2013; div. 2017)

Tolga Güleç (born 20 September 1981) is a Turkish actor. He started studying Business Administration at Çukurova University. However, he decided to pursue a different path in fine arts and left Çukurova University to study and graduate from Dokuz Eylül University's Faculty of Fine Arts Theater Department, Acting Department.

== Filmography ==
- 2024: Kötü Kan (Oktay Kaya)
- 2024: Filme Gel
- 2023: Güneşi Beklerken Simitçi
- 2022: Gelsin Hayat Bildiği Gibi (Rıza)
- 2022: Erkek Severse (Hakan)
- 2021: Masumiyet (Timur Yüksel)
- 2020: Kırmızı Oda
- 2019: Kızım Gibi Kokuyorsun (Mustafa)
- 2019: Leke (Mehmet Tuna)
- 2019: Yüzleşme (Tunç)
- 2017: Fazilet Hanım ve Kızları (Gökhan Egemen)
- 2016: Poyraz Karayel (Neşet Topal)
- 2015: Son Çıkış (Cesur)
- 2014: Hayat Ağacı (Kenan)
- 2013–2014: Adını Kalbime Yazdım (Halil)
- 2010: Öyle Bir Geçer Zaman Ki
- 2009: Cin Geçidi (Cinema)
- 2008: Gece Gündüz (TV series) (9th episode)
- 2008: Hatırla Sevgili (TV series)
- 2006–2007: Kırık Kanatlar (TV series)
- 2005–2006: Misi (TV series)
- 2003–2004: Portakal Suyu (short film)
- 2003–2004: Maça Beşli Müzik Grubu 40.Yıl Kutlamaları (music video)

== Theatre ==
- 2009: Chamaco (Abel Gonzalez Melo)
- 2009: Roberto Zucco (Bernard Marie Koltes)
- 2008: Küçük Adam Ne Oldu Sana (Hans Fallada)
- 2006–2007: İnsandan Kaçan (Molière)
- 2005–2006: Yer Demir Gök Bakır (Yaşar Kemal)
- 2005–2006: Zifir ve Şevder
- 2004–2005: Yaşama Dokunamayanlar Çadırı
- 2004–2005: Cadı Kazanı (Arthur Miller)
- 2003–2004: Richard III (W. Shakespeare)
- 2003–2004: Oyunun Oyunu (Michael Frayn)
- 2002–2003: Toros Canavarı (İzmir state theater)
- 2001–2002: Öykülerin Azizliği (İzmir state theater)
