= Gabriel Bounin =

French author and dramaturgist

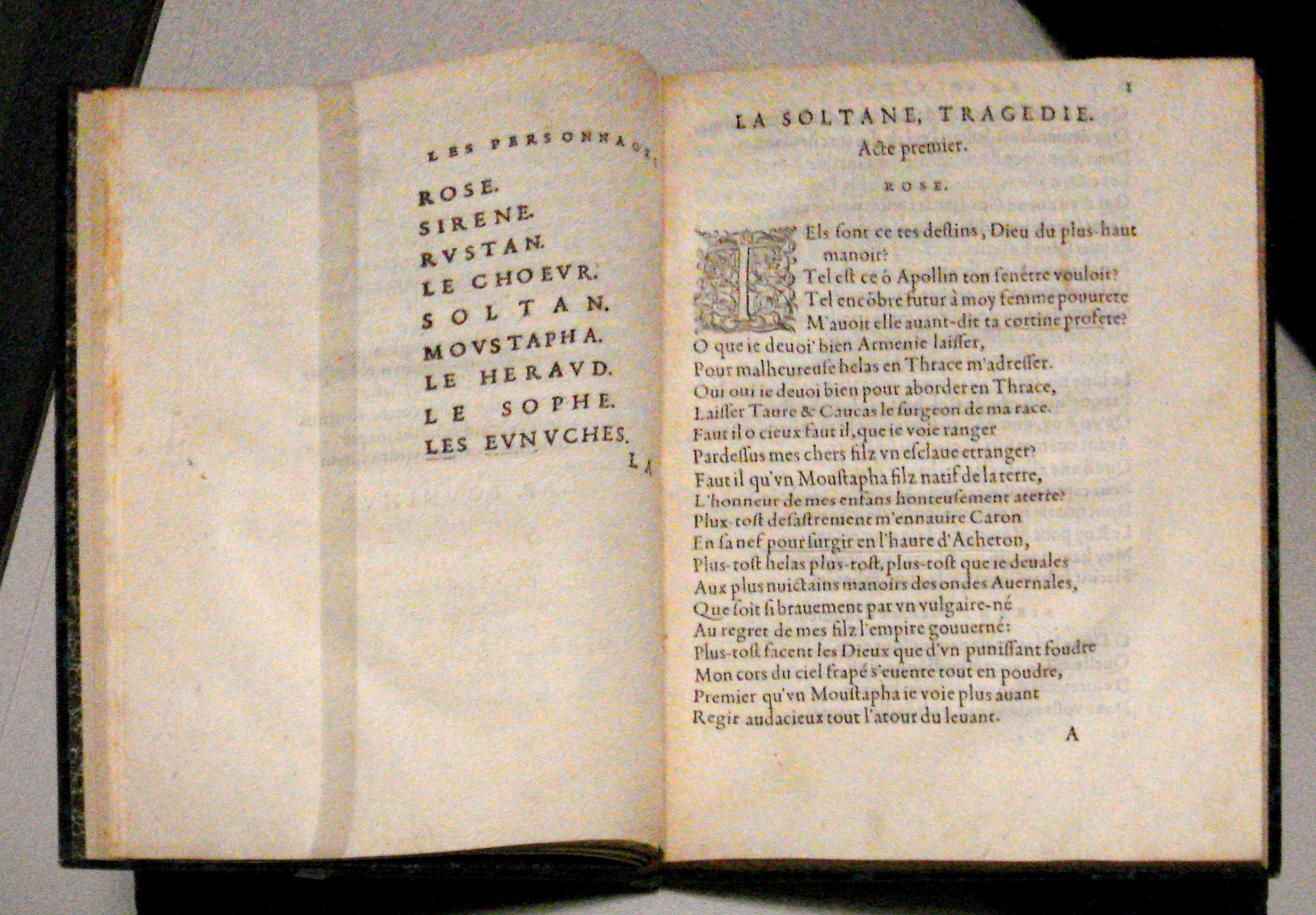
La Soltane by Gabriel Bounin, 1561.

Gabriel Bounin (1520 in Chateauroux - 1604) was a French writer and dramaturgist of the 16th century. He was a lawyer of Châteauroux in Berry. In 1561, Gabriel Bounin published La Soltane, a tragedy highlighting the role of Roxelane (with no reliable sources or proof) in the execution of Şehzade Mustafa, the elder son of the Ottoman Sultan Suleiman the Magnificent. In defiance of the rules of the Pléiade, La Soltane was a play about a contemporary event, rather than a Classical one. This tragedy marks the first time the Ottomans were introduced on stage in France.

== Works ==
- La Soltane
- Satyre au Roy contre les Republiquains

== See also ==
- Franco-Ottoman alliance
