= İffet =

- Genre: Drama
- Created by: Zülküf Yücel
- Written by: Can Sinan; Zehra Güleray
- Directed by: Faruk Teber
- Starring: Deniz Çakır; İbrahim Çelikkol; Zuhal Olcay; Melike Güner; Mahir Günşiray
- Theme music composer: Mehmet Andiçen; Barış Aryay
- Country of origin: Turkey
- Original language: Turkish
- No. of seasons: 2
- No. of episodes: 40

Production
- Producer: Faruk Turgut
- Production location: Istanbul
- Editor: Ahsan Tüzün
- Running time: ~90-120 minutes
- Production company: Gold Film

Original release
- Network: Star TV
- Release: September 17, 2011 – September 24, 2012

İffet is a Turkish TV series which aired from September 17, 2011 to September 24, 2012 on Star TV. It is remake of 1982 film same name which Müjde Ar played.

== Plot ==
The story revolves around the character of İffet (Deniz Çakır). She is a young and beautiful daughter of Ahmet Kılıç. She also has a sister named Nimet. They are living in a small house and are very poor. İffet is in love with a taxi driver named Cemil (İbrahim Çelikkol), but they break up after Cemil raped her during her best friend's wedding. İffet then knows that she is pregnant, but when she tells Cemil, Cemil is unhappy and leaves her. İffet is heartbroken and later her father knows about her pregnancy where he hits her. Cemil proposes to Betül, İffet's friend, who she too is in love with Cemil because he doesn't have money to live where Betül's family has money. They get engaged and later married.

Meanwhile, her boss, Ali İhsan, proposes to her to get married, which she brokenheartedly accepts. After the wedding Ali İhsan notices that Cemil and İffet still love each other. He shoots Cemil with his gun, but his daughter, who is in love with Cemil, jumps in front of him and got a shoot. Ali Ihsan commits suicide because he thinks that he killed his daughter. After Nil's father death she decided to back to England where her mother lives.

Cemil and İffet get married and have a daughter, but she goes missing after a car accident.

A man named Halil finds their daughter and raises her. Six years later, he meets Iffet and became her friend. After he found out that he raised her daughter, he told Iffet that his daughter is actually hers. He didn't want to give away his daughter, and he tried to shoot Iffet, but Cemil arrived and the gun falls. Iffet took the gun and shoots, but instead of Halil, Cemil dies.

== Cast ==
- Deniz Çakır - İffet
- İbrahim Çelikkol - Cemil
- Zuhal Olcay - Dilek
- Melike Güner - Betül
- Mahir Günşiray - Ali İhsan

== International broadcasters ==
- Afghanistan on Tolo TV from March 26, 2013
- Argentina on Telefe from May 21, 2018
- Bosnia and Herzegovina on Televizija OBN from January 23, 2014
- Bulgaria on Diema Family from July 1, 2014
- Chile on Mega from July 7, 2017
- Croatia on RTL Passion from January 18, 2016
- Georgia on Rustavi 2 from October 22, 2013
- Greece on ANT1 from February 22, 2014
- Iran on NEX1TV from October 19, 2013
- Kazakhstan on Astana TV from February, 2014
- Kosovo on Kohavision TV from October 30, 2013
- Montenegro on Nova M from May 30, 2019
- Morocco on 2M TV from July 5, 2017
- North Macedonia on Kanal 5 from April 10, 2012
- Mexico on Imagen from November 27, 2018
- Pakistan on Geo Kahani from February 24, 2014
- Romania on Kanal D Romania from May 7, 2013
- Serbia on Happy from October 10, 2016
- Northern Cyprus on Star TV from September 17, 2011
- Israel on Viva
- Nicaragua on Canal 10 (Nicaragua)
- Peru on Latina Televisión from September 28, 2020
- Spain on Divinity (TV channel) from February 4, 2023
