= Yengeç Sepeti =

- Directed by: Yavuz Özkan
- Written by: Yavuz Özkan
- Starring: Derya Alabora; Sadri Alışık
- Release date: 18 November 1994
- Running time: 95 minutes
- Country: Turkey
- Language: Turkish

Yengeç Sepeti (Turkish for 'Crab Basket') is a 1994 Turkish drama film directed by Yavuz Özkan.

== Cast ==
- Derya Alabora
- Sadri Alışık
- Macide Tanır
- Mehmet Aslantuğ
- Şahika Tekand
- Ege Aydan
- Sedef Ecer
- Oktay Kaynarca
- Berna Tunalı
- Bora Kaskan

== Awards ==
- Yengeç Sepeti won five awards at the 1994 Antalya Golden Orange Film Festival
