= Masumiyet (TV series) =

2021 Turkish television series

- Genre: Psychological thriller Drama
- Written by: Sırma Yanık
- Directed by: Ömür Atay
- Starring: Hülya Avşar; Mehmet Aslantuğ; Deniz Çakır; İlayda Alişan; Serkay Tütüncü
- Composers: Tuna Hizmetli; Hakan Yeşilkaya
- Country of origin: Turkey
- Original language: Turkish
- No. of seasons: 1
- No. of episodes: 13

Production
- Producer: Faruk Targut
- Production location: Istanbul
- Running time: 120 minutes

Original release
- Network: FOX
- Release: 24 February – 24 May 2021

Masumiyet (transl. "Innocence") is a Turkish psychological thriller and drama television series directed by Ömür Atay and written by Sırma Yanık and produced by Faruk Targut. It starred Hülya Avşar, Mehmet Aslantuğ, Deniz Çakır and İlayda Alişan as the leading characters. It premiered on 24 February 2021 and concluded on 24 May 2021 with a total of 13 episodes.

== Plot ==
The life of Bahar (Deniz Çakır), who is married and has two children, changes when her 19-year-old daughter falls in love with the wrong man. The first love of her daughter Ela (İlayda Alişan) is not a university student her age but rather her father's 35-year-old boss, who is about to marry someone else. Bahar's efforts to save her daughter from this relationship are inconclusive.

== Cast ==
- Hülya Avşar - Hale Ilgaz
- Deniz Çakır - Bahar Yüksel
- Mehmet Aslantuğ - Harun Orhun
- İlayda Alişan - Ela Yüksel
- Serkay Tütüncü - İlker Ilgaz
- Deniz Işın - İrem Orhun Ilgaz
- Tolga Güleç - Timur Yüksel
- Asena Tuğal - Banu Kaya
- Ertuğrul Postoğlu - İsmail Ilgaz
- Selen Uçer - Yelda Demirci
- Asena Keskinci - Hande Hancı
- Neslihan Arslan - Birce
- Rüçhan Çalışkur - Gülizar Yüksel
- Alayça Öztürk - Neva Hancı
- Kimya Gökçe Aytaç - Asu Ilgaz
- Gizem Ergün - Emel Yüksel
- Ozan Kaya Oktu - Umut Demirci
- Adin Külçe - Mert Yüksel
- Almina Günaydın - Aleyna
- Sevgi Temel - Burçak
- Süreyya Güzel - Avukat Beril
- Ceren Erginsoy
- Sonat Tokuç - Cenk
