= Mahidevran =

Concubine of Suleiman the Magnificent

Mahidevran Hatun
- Born: c. 1499; Circassia or Montenegro or Albania or Crimea
- Died: 1581 (aged 81–82); Bursa, Ottoman Empire
- Burial: Muradiye Complex, Bursa
- Consort of: Suleiman the Magnificent
- Issue: Şehzade Mustafa
- Religion: Sunni Islam (converted)

Mahidevran Hatun (Ottoman Turkish: ماه دوران, lit. 'moon of [good] fortune'; c. 1499 – 1581), also known as Gülbahar, (Ottoman Turkish: کل بھار, meaning "spring rose"), was a concubine of Sultan Suleiman the Magnificent of the Ottoman Empire and the mother of Şehzade Mustafa.

== Title and status ==
Mahidevran was the mother of Şehzade Mustafa, the eldest surviving son of the reigning Sultan. She held a prominent position in the harem of her son in Manisa. While Hürrem Sultan became Suleiman's favorite and legal wife, Mahidevran retained the status of the mother of Suleiman's eldest son, and was referred to as Suleiman's "first wife" by some diplomats, despite the fact that they were never married. Until Hürrem was given the title of "Sultan" and later "Haseki Sultan", a new title created for her, all consorts had the simple courtesy title of "Hatun", meaning "lady, woman". Therefore, Mahidevran never had the title of Sultana in the hierarchy of the harem and she was called simply "Mahidevran Hatun", although she commanded respect as the mother of the Sultan's eldest surviving son. Nonetheless, in historical fiction she is often mistakenly given the title Sultan. Furthermore, she is sometimes erroneously titled as Baş Kadın, however this title did not exist in the 16th century.

== Life with Suleiman ==
Her origins are unknown but Circassian, Albanian, Montenegrin, or Crimean origins are attributed to her. Mahidevran was listed among the seventeen women of the harem of Suleiman while he was governor of Manisa. On the basis of stipend, three women ranked above her at 5 aspers a day, while two others shared her stipend level of 4 aspers. Mahidevran gave birth to her first and only confirmed child Şehzade Mustafa in 1515, thus her status within the harem rose. After the death of Sultan Selim I in 1520, Suleiman ascended the throne. After his accession, she came to reside in the Old Palace in Constantinople.

In 1521, when Suleiman lost his two oldest sons, Mahmud and Murad, Mustafa became the eldest surviving son of Suleiman's princely generation. This gave Mahidevran an elevated position, but early in Suleiman's reign, Mahidevran encountered a new rival, Hürrem, who soon became Suleiman's favourite and later his legal wife. It was recorded by Bernardo Navagero that at the beginning of his reign, Suleiman used to highly cherish Mahidevran along with Hürrem but the former soon fell into disfavour latest by 1526 as per Bragadin's report. According to Navagero's report, as a result of the bitter rivalry a fight between the two women broke out, with Mahidevran beating and humiliating Hürrem, which enraged Suleiman. Mahidevran was referred to as "the Circassian, naturally proud and beautiful", she demanded that every woman should submit to her authority and acknowledge her as their mistress because not only was she the mother of the oldest prince, but had also served the sultan before Hürrem. Peirce concurs to the episode's authenticity but considers it embellished to at least some extent especially given the staunch decorum of the harem. Peirce wonders whether Mahidevran had an irascible personality or was prone to violence—all other references to her in Venetian reports were apparently exemplary but the incident doesn't seem preposterous to her as Mahidevran's self-defense to the sultan—the assault on her rank as senior concubine—is wholly plausible.

The rivalry between the two women was partially suppressed by Hafsa Sultan, Suleiman's mother. By 1526, Suleiman had stopped paying attention to Mahidevran and devoted his full affection to Hürrem. Even though Suleiman and Hürrem developed a closer relationship, Mahidevran, as the mother of Mustafa, the eldest surviving son, retained a privileged position within the harem. Suleiman also ensured her and their son Mustafa's continued comfort. Pietro Bragadin, ambassador in the early years of Suleiman's reign, reported that while both were still resident in the imperial palace in Istanbul, Mustafa was his mother's "whole joy".

== Mustafa's governorship ==
According to Turkish tradition, all princes were expected to work as provincial governors (Sanjak-bey) as a part of their training. Mustafa was sent to Manisa in 1533 and Mahidevran accompanied him. As per tradition, Mahidevran was at the head of Mustafa's princely harem. Up until the very end of her son's life, she endeavored to protect Mustafa from his political rivals, and most probably maintained a network of informants in order to do so. Foreign observers of the Ottomans, especially the ambassadors of the Venetian Republic followed Ottoman dynastic politics closely; their comments about Mahidevran glimpses of the vital role played by a prince's mother and of her necessary devotion to this welfare.

The grand vizier Pargalı Ibrahim Pasha was also a strong supporter of Mustafa. Correspondence between the pasha as well as between Mahidevran and Mustafa, suggests a close and affectionate relationship between them. In her letter to the pasha, Mahidevran extensively acknowledges the strong familial bond, emphasising the genuine friendship and caring support demonstrated by the pasha. Describing Mustafa's court at Diyarbakır near the Safavid border, Bassano wrote around 1540 that the prince had "a most wonderful and glorious court, no less than that of his father" and that "his mother, who was with him, instructs him in how to make himself loved by the people." In 1541, Mustafa was transferred to Amasya. By 1546, three more of Suleiman's sons were in the field, and the competition for the succession began among the four princes, although the sultan would live for another twenty years.

The ambassador Bernado Navagero, in a 1553 report, described Mahidevran's efforts to protect her son: "Mustafa has with him his mother, who exercises great diligence to guard him from poisoning and reminds him everyday that he has nothing else but this to avoid, and it is said that he has boundless respect and reverence for her." Mustafa was an immensely popular prince. When he was a child, the Venetian ambassador had reported that "he has extraordinary talent, he will be warrior, is much loved by the Janissaries, and performs great feats." In 1553, Navagero wrote, "It is impossible to describe how much he is loved and desired by all as successor to the throne."

The rumours and speculations said that, towards the end of Suleiman's long reign, the rivalry between his sons became evident and furthermore, both Hürrem and the grand vizier Rüstem Pasha turned him against Mustafa and Mustafa was accused of causing unrest. However, there is no evidence of such a conspiracy. During the campaign against Safavid Persia in 1553, Suleiman ordered the execution of Mustafa on charges of planning to dethrone his father; his guilt for the treason of which he was accused has since been neither proven nor disproven. The ambassador Trevisano related in 1554 that on the day Mustafa was executed, Mahidevran had sent a messenger warning him of his father's plans to kill him. Mustafa unfortunately ignored the message; according to Trevisano, he had consistently refused to heed the warnings of his friends and even his mother.

== Later years and death ==
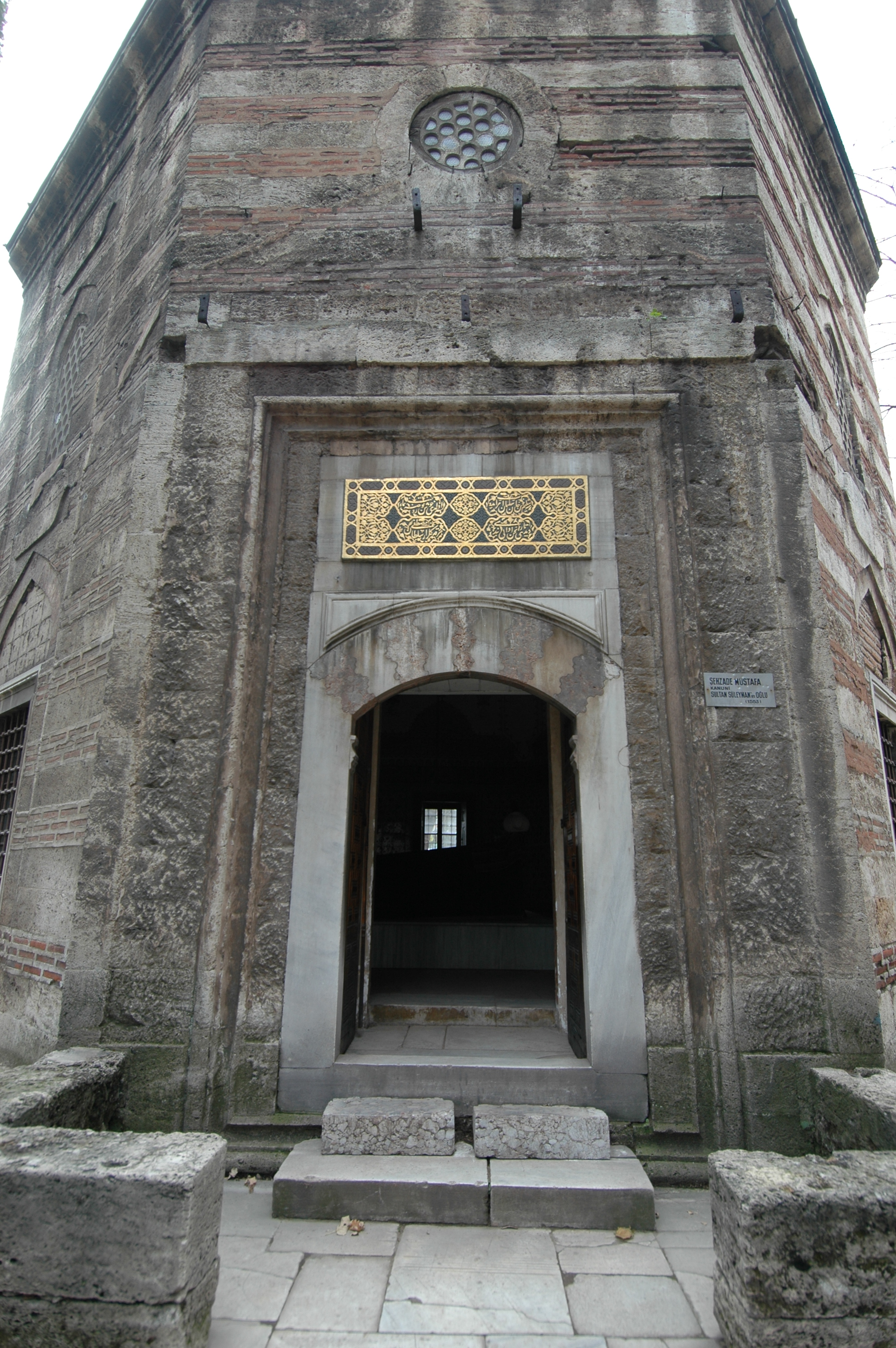
The entrance of Mustafa's türbe at Muradiye Complex, where she is buried

For many years after her son's execution, Mahidevran lived a troubled and impoverished life. She went to Bursa, where her son Mustafa was buried and became the last concubine to retire to Bursa. Less fortunate than her predecessors and presumably disgraced by her son's execution, she was unable to pay the rent on the house in which she lived, and her servants were taunted and cheated in the local markets. According to one testimony, some years after Mustafa's death, allegedly Suleiman's childhood friend and milk brother, Yahya Efendi recommended Mahidevran to be welcomed back into the palace. She had asked Yahya to intercede on her behalf. Suleiman perceived Yahya's request as insolent, resulting in his dismissal from his teaching position. Around 1573, nearly two decades after her son's execution, Mahidevran's situation improved when her debts were paid off and a house was purchased for her by Sultan Selim II (who had ascended the throne in 1566). Mustafa was finally sanctioned a proper burial by the benevolence of his younger half-brother Sultan Selim II; earlier, the body of Prince Mustafa, who died in Konya Ereğlisi in 1553, was brought to Bursa and buried elsewhere, and after remaining there for about twenty years, he was buried in this tomb built by Mehmed Cavus. Financially secure at last, Mahidevran had enough income to create an endowment for the upkeep of her son's tomb. She died on 1581, outliving Suleiman and all of his children, and was buried in Mustafa's tomb. This mausoleum houses four coffins in total, that of Şehzâde Mustafa, his mother, Mahidevran, an unknown child (possibly his executed son) and Şehzâde Osman, most probably a son of his great-grandfather, Sultan Bayezid II who had died in 1512/13 thus having the oldest tomb in this Türbe.

== Depictions in literature and popular culture ==
- Mahidevran is a character in M. Turhan Tan's historical novel Hurrem Sultan (1937).
- In the 1997–2003 Ukrainian TV series, Roxolana, Mahidevran is played by Ukrainian actress Natalya Goncharova.
- In the 2003 TV miniseries, Hürrem Sultan, Mahidevran is played by Turkish actress Hatice Aslan.
- Mahidevran is a character in Adnan Nur Baykal's historical novel Hürrem Sultan ile Söyleşi (2004).
- In the 2005 German documentary miniseries Mätressen – Die geheime Macht der Frauen (Mistresses – The Secret Power of Women), Mahidevran is played by German actress Yasmina Djaballah.
- In the 2008 Ukrainian documentary Roxolana: Bloody Path to the Throne, Mahidevran is played by Ukrainian actress Natalia Kalashnikova.
- Mahidevran is a character in Alum Bati's historical novel Harem Secrets (2008).
- In the 2011–2014 TV series Muhteşem Yüzyıl, starring Asli Göksu as teen Mahidevran and Nur Fettahoğlu as young and old Mahidevran.
- Mahidevran is the main character of Kemalettin Çalık's historical novel Mahidevran Sultan (2012).
- Mahidevran is the main character of Ridvan Akbay's historical novel Mother to a Prince: Mahidevran Sultan (2021).
- Mahidevran is a character in Christopher de Bellaigue's historical novel The Lion House: The Rise of Suleyman the Magnificent (2022).
- Mahidevran is a character in Bea Eschen's historical novel Orontius and Mafalda: On a Mystical Journey (2023).

== See also ==
- List of consorts of the Ottoman Sultans

== Bibliography ==
- Peirce, Leslie P. (1993). The Imperial Harem: Women and Sovereignty in the Ottoman Empire. Oxford University Press. ISBN 0-19-508677-5.
- Şahin, K. (2023). Peerless Among Princes: The Life and Times of Sultan Süleyman. Oxford University Press. ISBN 978-0-19-753163-1.
- Yermolenko, G.I. (2013). Roxolana in European Literature, History and Culture. Ashgate Publishing Limited. ISBN 978-1-4094-7611-5.
