= Şehzade Mustafa (son of Suleiman the Magnificent) =

Ottoman prince (died 1553)

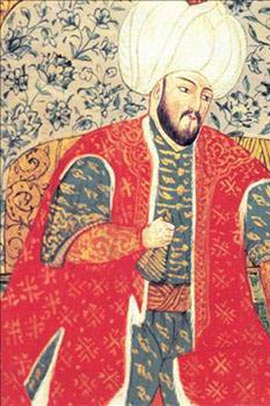
- An Ottoman miniature of Mustafa

Governor of Amasya
- Tenure: 16 June 1541 – 6 October 1553

Governor of Manisa
- Tenure: 3 May 1533 – 16 June 1541
- Born: c. 1515; Manisa Palace, Manisa, Ottoman Empire
- Died: 6 October 1553 (aged 37–38); Ereğli, Konya, Ottoman Empire
- Burial: Muradiye Complex, Bursa
- Issue: Fatma Sultan; Nergisşah Sultan; Şehzade Mehmed; Şah Sultan; Şehzade Ahmed; Şehzade Orhan
- Dynasty: Ottoman
- Father: Suleiman the Magnificent
- Mother: Mahidevran Hatun
- Religion: Sunni Islam

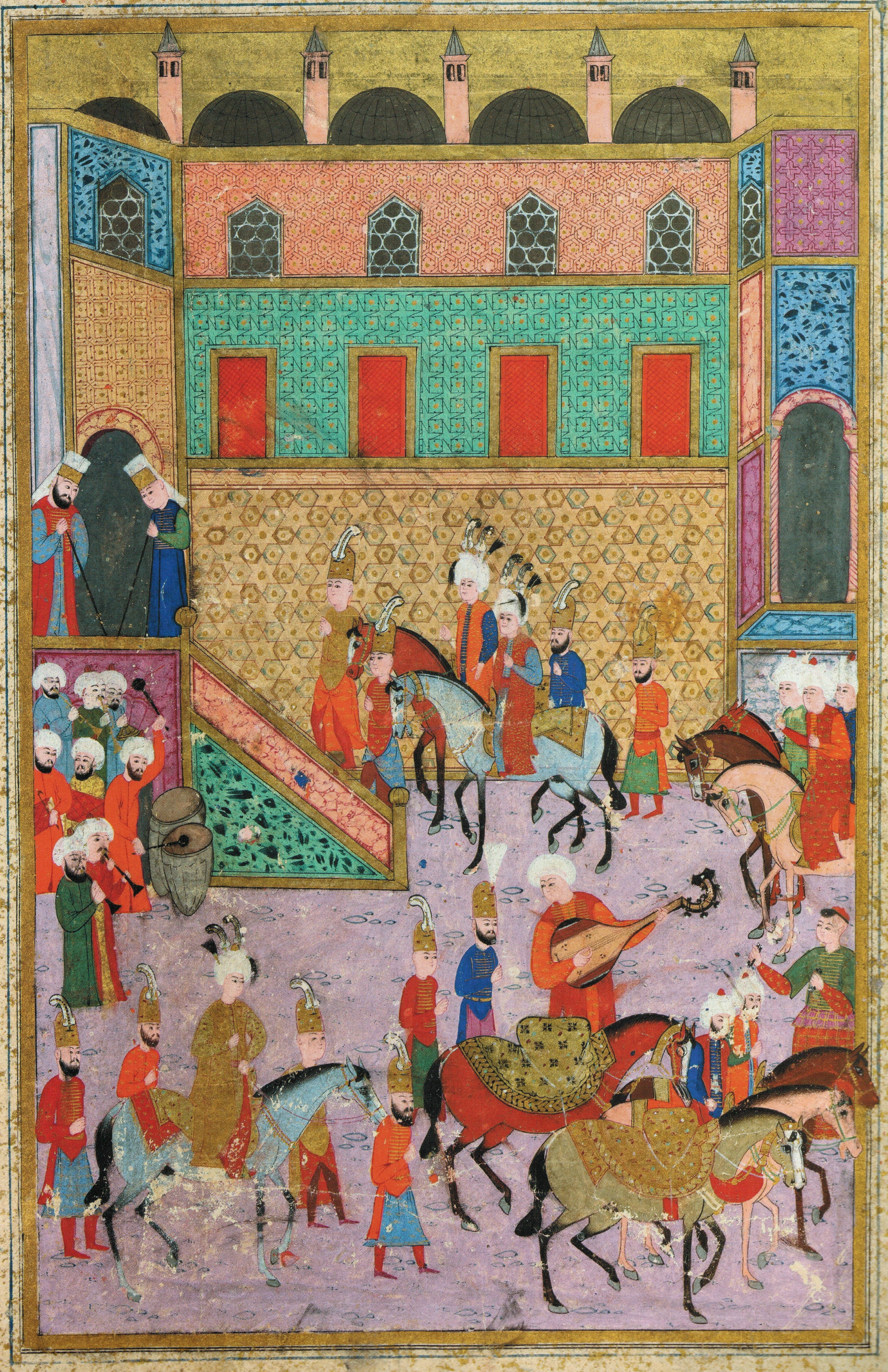
Mustafa's circumcision, 1530

Şehzade Mustafa (Ottoman Turkish: شهزاده مصطفى; c. 1516/1517 – 6 October 1553) was an Ottoman prince, son of sultan Suleiman the Magnificent and his concubine Mahidevran Hatun. Mustafa was Suleiman's oldest surviving son, governor of Manisa from 1533 to 1541 and of Amasya from 1541 to 1553, when he was executed by his father's order on charges of sedition and treason.

== Early life ==
Mustafa was born around 1516/1517 in Manisa to Suleiman, who was then a prince, and his concubine Mahidevran Hatun. After Suleiman's accession to the throne in 1520 following the death of his father Selim I, Mustafa and his mother came to reside in the Old Palace in Constantinople. With the deaths of his older half-brothers, Mahmud and Murad in 1520, Mustafa became his father's only heir until the birth of the children of the new favorite Hürrem Sultan starting from 1521. Pietro Bragadin, ambassador in the early years of Suleiman's reign, reported that Mustafa was his mother’s "whole joy". In June–July 1530, a three-week celebration was organised in Constantinople that centered around the circumcision of Mustafa, and his younger half-brothers Mehmed, and Selim. The princes were circumcised on 27 June 1530. The festivities ranged from displays of captured enemy items to simulated battles, featuring performances by jugglers and strongmen, as well as reenactments of recent conflicts. Suleiman played a crucial role, observing everything from a loggia in the Hippodrome, while Pargalı Ibrahim Pasha actively oversaw the proceedings and presented extravagant gifts to the sultan and the princes. Mustafa received instruction in religious fundamentals and literature, coupled with training in martial arts and horsemanship. He wrote poems under the pen name Muhlisi.

== Governorship ==
Mustafa was recognised for his courage and intelligence, earning significant favour and respect among the janissaries. It was anticipated that he would develop into a formidable warrior. On 3 May 1533, he was appointed as the governor of Manisa. Mustafa was placed in charge of Anatolia in 1534 and 1538, when Suleiman and the grand vizier were occupied with the Persian and then Moldavian campaigns. In 1534, Ibrahim Pasha wrote to Mustafa, confirming the receipt of a letter from the prince discussing matters in the Aegean and updating him on his father's successes in the Baghdad campaign. In the letter, he identifies himself as Mustafa's "faithful friend" and expresses the desire to meet soon, hoping to benefit from and be uplifted by the prince's noble and blessed presence. Around 1540, Bassano described Mustafa's court at Diyarbakır near the Safavid border, stating that the prince possessed a remarkable and splendid court, comparable to that of his father.

On 16 June 1541, he was transferred to Amasya, where his son, Şehzade Mehmed was born in 1546. Mustafa likely perceived the clear preference given to his half-brothers as evident in his removal from the governorship in Manisa, a favoured position for Ottoman princes. His relocation to Amasya in 1541, despite a considerable increase in his annual stipend, was a move he resented. Though he might not have openly expressed his displeasure, his tutor Sürurî mentioned it in a poem. To exacerbate matters, Saruhan was later bestowed upon Mehmed, Suleiman and Hürrem’s eldest son, after a year's vacancy. Following Mehmed's sudden death in November 1543, the district governorship passed to their second son, Selim, in the spring of 1544. Mustafa found himself excluded from this inner circle, despite having numerous sympathisers within the military elite.

As Suleiman crossed Anatolia in 1548 to take up arms once more against the Safavids, his eleventh campaign, he met with Mustafa, whom he had summoned from Amasya to accompany him for several days. A unique firsthand account details a meeting between the two of them in May, shedding light on their complex relationship. As Suleiman advanced east with the army, he encountered Mustafa near Sivas, revealing previous strains in their connection. During this encounter, the sultan, acknowledging recent discord, expressed affection toward the prince. Mustafa received a grand welcome from high-ranking officials, and the entire army camp paid homage as he proceeded to his father's tent, reminiscent of the reunion of Jacob and Joseph after a prolonged separation. Their conversation, marked by Mustafa's "loyalty" and "good manners," left the contemporary observer noting the palpable "relief and joy" experienced by the prince. The Süleymanname, a history commissioned by Suleiman, further emphasised Mustafa's exceptional treatment during this encounter, avoiding explicit mention of any prior issues between father and son.

While serving as the district governor in Amasya, he effectively established a reputation as a supporter of poetry and scholarship, a guardian of the populace, a dispenser of justice, and a congenial companion to the members of the military elite. In 1549, the governor of Erzurum was killed by Georgians, after which Mustafa sought Istanbul's help to retaliate. However, Rüstem Pasha, the husband of Mustafa's half-sister Mihrimah Sultan, anticipating that Mustafa would gain more prestige by defeating the Georgians, opted not to send support to the prince. In 1550, Iranian highway robbers crossed Ottoman borders, pillaging villages in eastern Anatolia. Once more, Mustafa requested aid, but Rüstem turned him down. Frustrated by Mustafa's persistent appeals, Rüstem recalled Mustafa's vizier, Lala Cafer Pasha, to Istanbul and appointed Bosnian Ahmed Pasha as a replacement and potential spy. However, the plan failed when Ahmed Pasha gained Mustafa's trust and married his daughter Fatma Sultan in 1552.

== Succession question ==
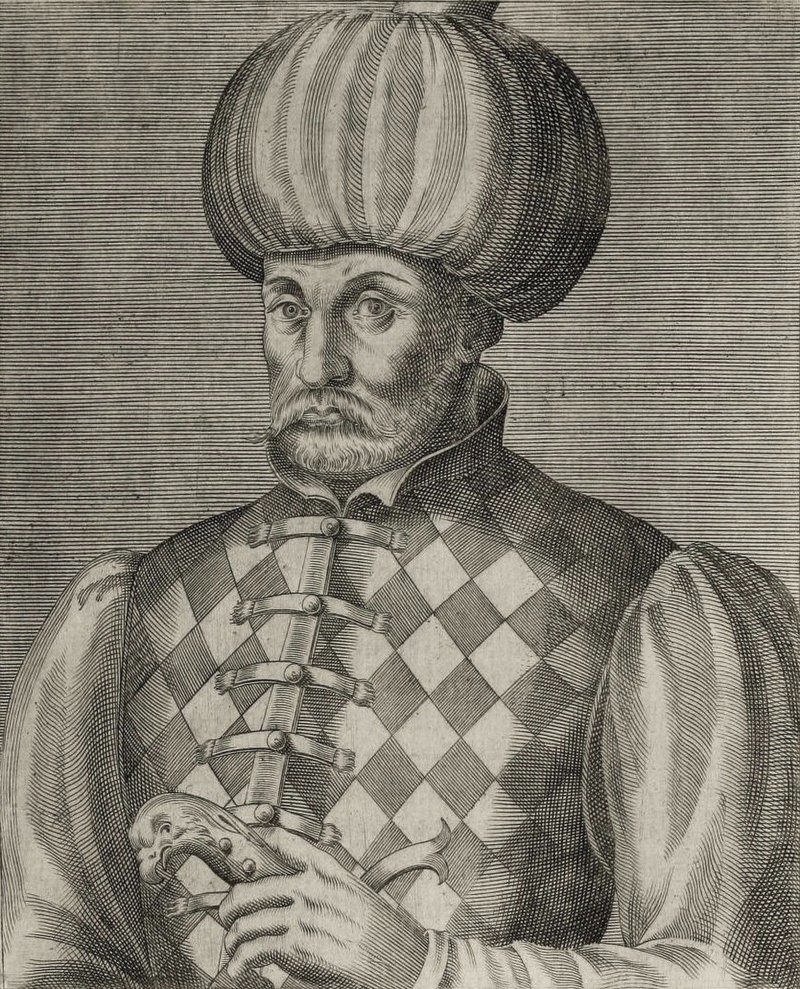
An engraving of Mustafa by André Thevet, dated 1584

Mustafa was widely regarded as a strong contender for the Ottoman throne. As early as the late 1540s, a Venetian ambassador observed his esteemed martial prowess and the janissaries' fondness for him, presenting him as the universally preferred candidate for the next sultan. This assessment was reiterated by another Venetian ambassador in the early 1550s, just before Mustafa's demise. In two letters dispatched to Henry II of France in the autumn and winter of 1549, a French diplomat conveyed information about the sultan's illness in the summer of 1549. The diplomat discussed the possibility of the sultan's death and Mustafa ascending to the throne. Rumors suggested that due to the sultan's ailment, Mustafa was summoned to the army camp near Diyarbakır as a potential successor. However, the diplomat expressed skepticism, noting that Suleiman had deep affection for his other sons, and Mustafa's rise to power might jeopardise their lives, as they would be at his mercy and could face execution.

The elderly sultan, grappling with health issues, opted for rest, delegating military campaigns to his viziers, possibly due to reluctance to leave the capital and a fear of succession wars even before his demise. The Habsburg ambassador Gerhard Veltwyck, toward the end of 1545, reported that Rüstem and other viziers were inclined towards a peace agreement due to the discord among Suleiman's sons. Both Veltwyck in February 1547 and the Habsburg ambassador in Istanbul, Malvezzi, in February 1550 reported Rüstem's intention to eliminate Mustafa, seeking to secure the throne for Selim. Hürrem, Mihrimah, and Rüstem collaborated to facilitate the accession of either Selim or Bayezid to the throne. Rüstem plotted against Mustafa, attempting to portray him as a Safavid ally. He forged Mustafa's seal, sending a deceptive letter to the Safavid ruler Tahmasp I, who unknowingly responded positively. Rüstem's men discovered the letter and delivered it to him.

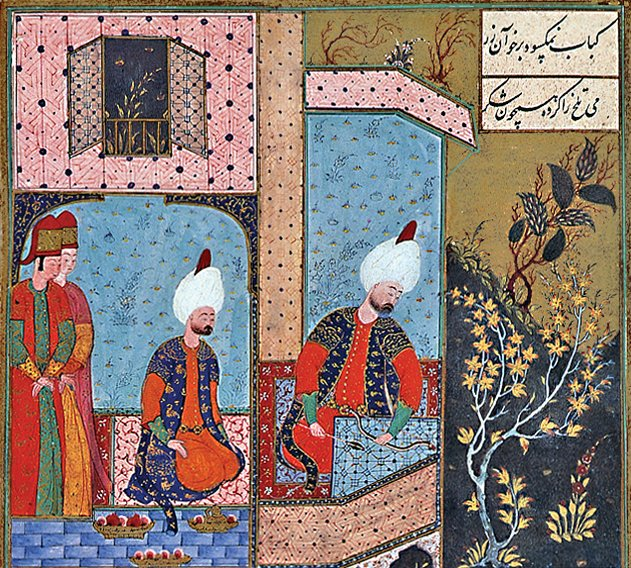
An Ottoman miniature showing Şehzade Mustafa with his father

Mustafa went beyond merely establishing a reputation, as an undated letter attributed to him, likely from the late 1540s, reveals. The letter, addressed to Ayas Pasha, governor of Erzurum, and a promising bureaucrat, primarily seeks the discreet support of a high-ranking member of the military elite in anticipation of the inevitable succession wars. Mustafa carefully emphasizes his intention to await his father's death, avoiding an outright rebellion. Simultaneously, he draws attention to his grandfather Selim's ascension to the throne, suggesting that, like Selim, he intends to reward supporters and punish those who do not side with him after becoming sultan. In the intricacies of the early modern empire's political landscape, where explicit declarations are rare, the allusion to Selim serves as a clear and powerful message. The letter also offers insights into Mustafa's self-perception and his beliefs about his brothers, indicating that he considered himself the only prince embodying the true qualities of a sultan. He asserted his Sharia-based right to the throne, challenging Ottoman custom. Ayas Pasha gave a positive response, assuring the prince that he was more deserving of the throne than his brothers. Mustafa's pursuit of support extended to diplomatic channels, as evidenced by his envoy Nebi Bey's mission to Venice shortly before his execution, aiming to secure political and logistical backing for his potential ascent to the throne.

== Safavid campaign ==
In late September 1552, Rüstem led the janissaries and palace troops to Anatolia for a campaign against the resurgent Safavids. Internal tensions arose among Ottoman forces due to persistent rumors about Mustafa's imminent ascension to the throne, leading Rüstem to camp near Konya as control over his men waned. Janissaries, breaking ranks, went to Amasya to express allegiance to Mustafa, perceived as their next sultan, before returning to the army camp. Simultaneously, rumors circulated about Suleiman's severe illness, intensifying the precarious situation for Rüstem. With skilled Ottoman forces supporting Mustafa, Rüstem faced the risk of condemnation if Suleiman's death or Mustafa's bold move to command the army occurred. This prompted the grand vizier to likely persuade Suleiman to take decisive action against Mustafa.

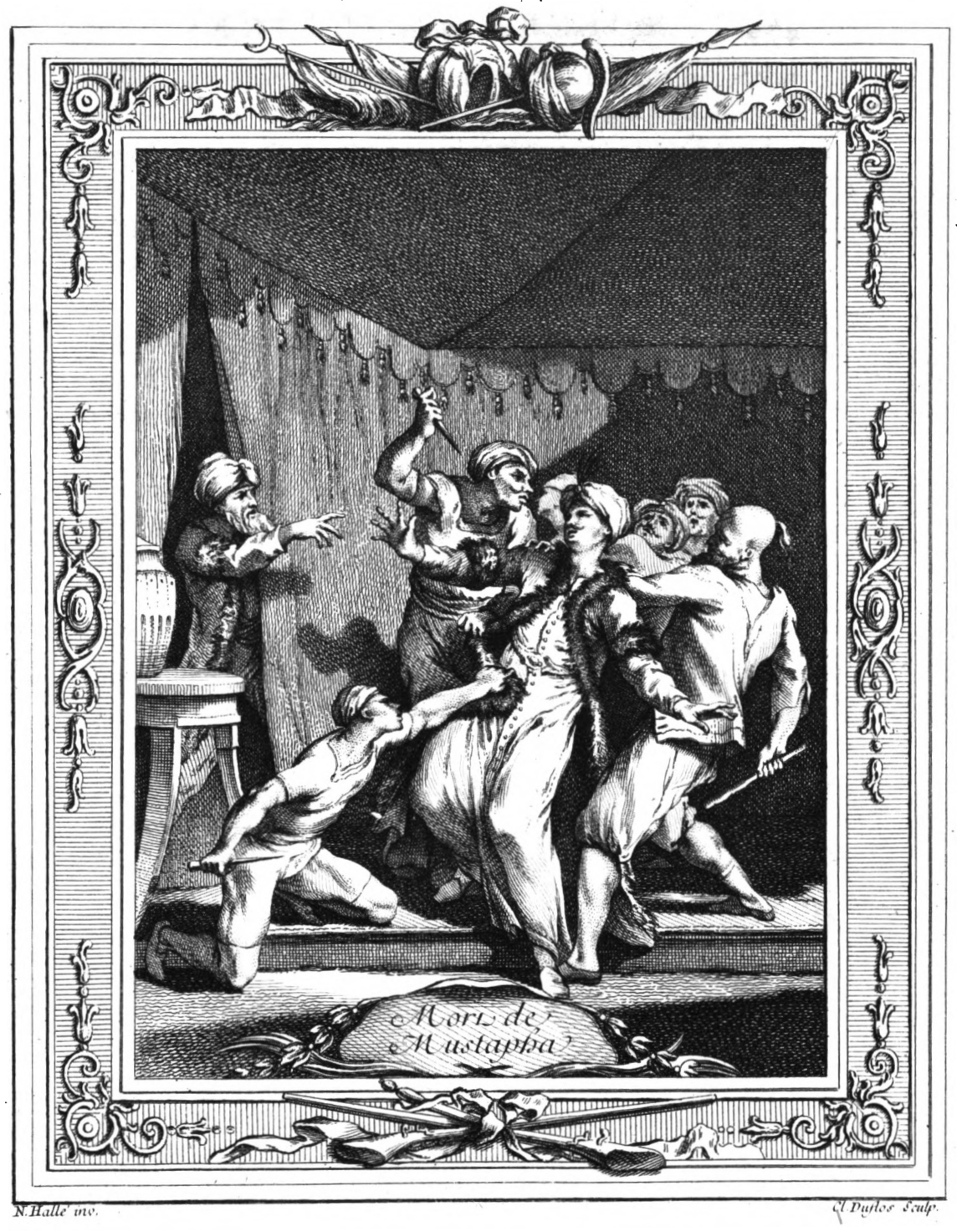
Strangling of Şehzade Mustafa; engraving by Cl. Duflos, 18th century

From the army camp near Konya, Rüstem sent messengers to Suleiman, informing him that Mustafa was poised to take decisive action. To substantiate the claim, Rüstem allegedly had a replica of Mustafa’s seal crafted and orchestrated a fabricated letter to the Safavid ruler Tahmasp, proposing an alliance. Tahmasp's unwitting response was intercepted by Rüstem's men, who forwarded it, along with news of the rebellious atmosphere in the army camp, to Suleiman as evidence of Mustafa's treason. Ultimately, Rüstem succeeded, leading to his recall to Constantinople. Suleiman assumed command of the Ottoman forces. The delay, likely influenced by Suleiman's health and the logistical challenges of eastern campaigns, might have been strategic, planning a winter stay in Aleppo before engaging the Safavids in the ensuing spring and summer. Discussions between Suleiman and Rüstem on handling Mustafa could have contributed to the departure delay.

Suleiman departed from Istanbul with Rüstem on 28 August 1553 with a splendid display, unfurling seven banners symbolising his authority over seven climes to counter rumours of his eldest son's potential ascension. Suleiman, marching east with a significant Ottoman force set camp near Ereğli, close to Konya. Seeking reassurance amid plots against him, Mustafa arrived near the army camp on 5 October for an audience with his father. Greeted warmly by officials and presented with gifts, Mustafa, aware of the delicate situation, hoped for a reconciliation during the audience. The positive reception to Mustafa indicated the cautious dynamics within the Ottoman family, recognising that refusal to attend the audience could be perceived as an act of rebellion.

== Execution ==
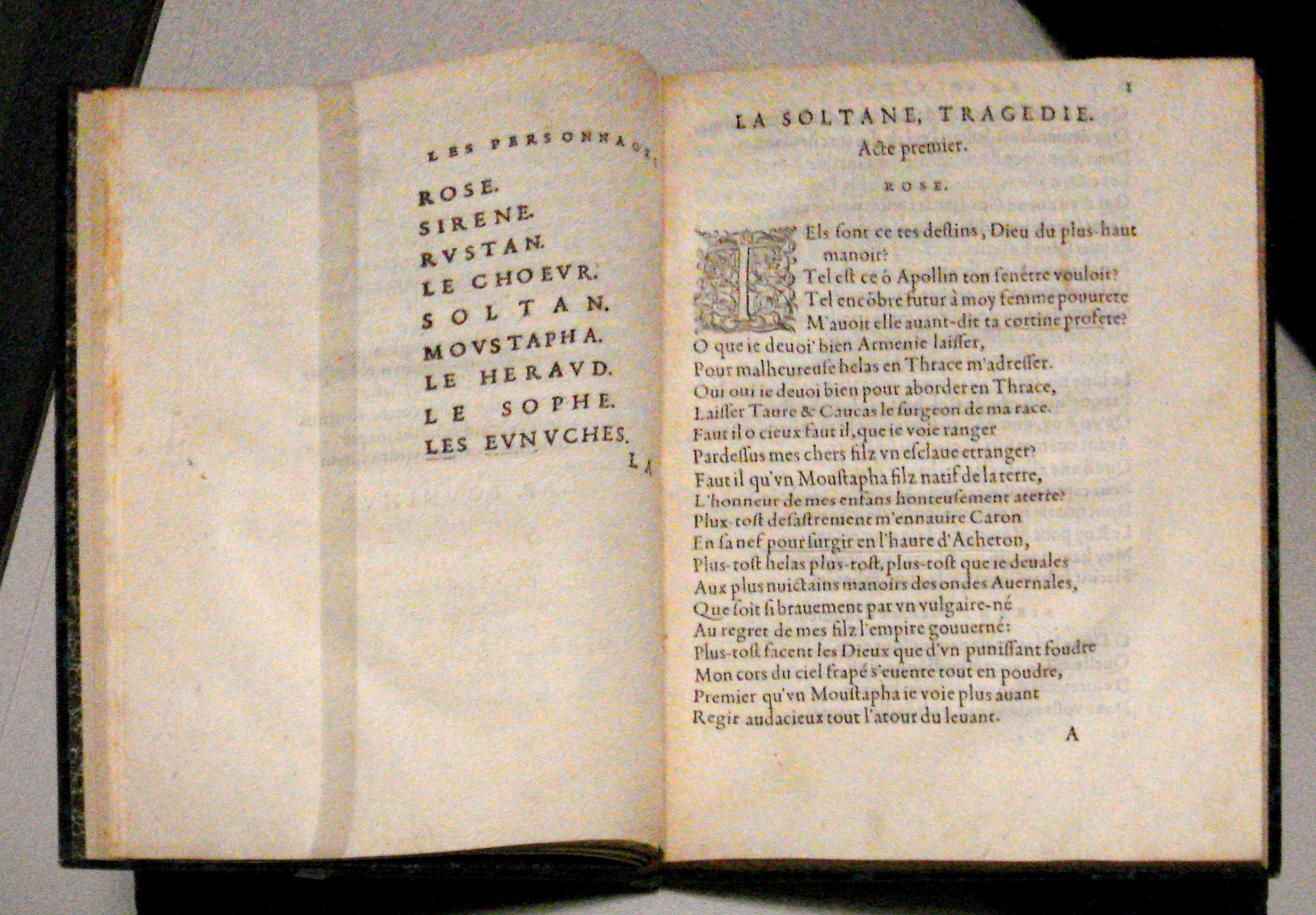
The execution of Mustafa in 1553 was the subject of the 1561 French tragedy La Soltane by Gabriel Bounin.

On 6 October 1553, around midday, Mustafa rode to the army camp and then to his father's tent, situated at its center. Following tradition, Mustafa dismounted, leaving his weapons outside the tent. The men accompanying him stayed outside, and upon entering the tent's inner chamber, Mustafa was attacked by executioners and strangled after a struggle. His lifeless body was promptly displayed in front of the sultan's tent as a message to his supporters. Some of his closest associates were executed, and others were dispersed across the realm through tımar grants. His property, including the gifts received the day before, was seized. Following a somber funeral prayer in the nearby town of Ereğli, Mustafa's corpse was hastily transported to Bursa, the former Ottoman capital and a burial ground for many dynasty members. His mother accompanied his body. His son Mehmed, who had been relocated there with female family members, was also executed by strangulation in May 1554, and was buried beside his father.

Mustafa's execution stirred widespread grief and dissent, prompting Suleiman to swiftly dismiss Rüstem from the grand vizierate. Public outrage found expression in poems, notably one by Taşlıcalı Yahya, and a popular chronogram implicated "Rüstem's conspiracy and deceit" (mekr-i Rüstem). The poets lamented Mustafa as a "martyr" (şehid), refuting allegations of his supposed collaboration with Tahmasp. Criticism extended to Rüstem, Hürrem, and even Chief Jurist Ebussuud Efendi. A Safavid source also conveyed discontent, using a chronogram to term the execution of Mustafa's son Mehmed as an "injustice repeated" (sitam-e mukarrar). A common narrative—in both major Ottoman historical accounts and the modern scholarly literature is that Hürrem and Rüstem plotted and framed Mustafa as a rebel in the eyes of the sultan, who then executed his innocent son.

== Family ==
=== Sons ===
Mustafa had at least three sons. All his sons alive at the time of his death were executed shortly after by their grandfather Suleiman the Magnificent.

- Şehzade Mehmed (1546, Amasya – May 1554, Bursa).
- Şehzade Ahmed (dead in 1553?).
- Şehzade Orhan (died in 1552/1553)

=== Daughters ===
Mustafa had at least three daughters:

- Fatma Sultan. She married Boşnak Ahmed Pasha in 1552.
- Nergisşah Sultan (1536, Manisa – 1592). In 1554, after her father's death, her grandfather Süleyman married her to Cenâbî Ahmed Pasha, who was twenty years older than her father and was Sanjak Bey of Kütahya for 20 years. She was widowed in 1562.
- Şah Sultan (c. 1547, Amasya – 2 November 1577). She married Abdülkerim Ağa, Janissaries' general, between 1562 and 1567.

== Depictions in literature and popular culture ==
- In 1561, eight years after Mustafa's death, the French author Gabriel Bounin wrote a tragedy titled La Soltane about the role of Hürrem Sultan in Mustafa's death. This tragedy marks the first time the Ottomans were introduced on stage in France.
- Anonymous 1581 Cambridge play Solymannidae.
- Anton Maria Caspi's 1606 French play Il Mustafa.
- Fulke Greville's 1609 British play The Tragedy of Mustapha.
- Georges Thilloy's French 1617 play, Solyman Il Quatorziesme Empereur des Turcs.
- Jean Mairet's 1639 French play Le Grand et Dernier Solyman ou la Mort de Mustapha.
- Charles von Dalibray's 1637 French play Le Solyman.
- Roger Boyle's 1665 British play The Tragedy of Mustapha, the Son of Solyman the Magnificent. Henry Harris portrayed Mustafa.
- F. Cerone's 1722 French play Il Solimano.
- In 1739 a British play Mustapha by David Mallet was performed at Drury Lane. William Milward portrayed Mustafa.
- Michel Angelo Valentini's 1756 French play Solimano.
- C. Federici's 1800 French play Solimano il Magnifico.
- Guido Dezan's 1886 French play Solimano II.
- In the 2003 Turkish TV miniseries, Hürrem Sultan, Mustafa was played by Turkish actor Ercü Turan.
- In the 2011 television series Muhteşem Yüzyıl, Mustafa is played by Turkish actor Mehmet Günsür.
- Mustafa is the main character of Ridvan Akbay's historical novel The Devoted Call for Hope: Mustafa, the Son of Suleiman (2021).
- Mustafa is the main character of Ridvan Akbay's another historical novel Black Tent: The Death of Prince Mustafa (2021).
- Mustafa's life and execution are depicted in the 2022 film Three Thousand Years of Longing, where he is played by Matteo Boccelli, son of singer Andrea Boccelli.

== Bibliography ==
- Atçıl, Zahit (2016-07-27). "Why Did Süleyman the Magnificent Execute His Son Şehzade Mustafa in 1553?". Osmanlı Araştırmaları. Osmanli Arastirmalari: 67–103. doi:10.18589/oa.586488. hdl:20.500.12723/1661. ISSN 0255-0636.
- Güler, Semra (2011-07-20). Şehzade Mustafa'nın hayatı (1515-1553) ve türbesi. Uludağ Üniversitesi.
- Peirce, L.P. (1993). The Imperial Harem: Women and Sovereignty in the Ottoman Empire. Studies in Middle Eastern history. Oxford University Press. ISBN 978-0-19-508677-5.
- Şahin, K. (2020). "Mustafa Çelebi", in: Encyclopaedia of Islam, 3, Edited by: Kate Fleet, Gudrun Krämer, Denis Matringe, John Nawas, Devin J. Stewart. doi:10.1163/1573-3912_ei3_com_40252.
- Şahin, K. (2023). Peerless Among Princes: The Life and Times of Sultan Süleyman. Oxford University Press. ISBN 978-0-19-753163-1.
