= Filiz Ahmet =

Turkish stage and screen actress (born 1981)

- Born: 15 April 1981 (age 45); Skopje, SR Macedonia, SFR Yugoslavia
- Citizenship: North Macedonia; Turkey
- Occupation: Actress
- Years active: 2002–present
- Website: www.filizahmet.com

Filiz Ahmet (born 15 April 1981) is a Macedonian-Turkish stage and screen actress. She is best known for her roles as Zarife in the Turkish TV series Elveda Rumeli (Farewell Rumelia) and Nigar Kalfa in the TV series Muhteşem Yüzyıl.

== Early life ==
Filiz Ahmet was born in Skopje, SR Macedonia. She is of Turkish descent. Filiz Ahmet has dual Macedonian and Turkish citizenship. Her mother works as a prompter, while her grandfather, Lüftü Seyfullah, was a Macedonian of Turkish descent, stage actor and co-founder of the Macedonian-Turkish Theatre.

The first play she watched in the theater was The Idiot, based on the novel by the same name written by Fyodor Dostoevsky. She developed a lifelong passion for theater, and was 6 when she first appeared on stage.

Ahmet's childhood coincided with the Yugoslav Wars. Due to the conflict, her family decided to go to Sweden, and later returned to Macedonia when she was 15. Filiz Ahmet graduated from medical school and then the Academy of Fine Arts in Skopje in 2003.

Ahmet can speak Istanbul dialect and Üsküp (Skopje) dialect which risk of getting lost in Turkish. She is multilingual and is able to speak Macedonian, Albanian, Swedish, English, Serbian, and Bulgarian.

== Career ==
Ahmet began as a stage actress and received several performance awards. She did not plan to act on-screen, and her busy theater schedule allowed little time for anything else. However, her breakthrough performance occurred in 2007 when she appeared in the role of Zarife in the series Elveda Rumeli. To make her character more expressive, Ahmet spoke her role in the Turkish dialect in Macedonia. After this series, she received offers in various television series. Her next project was Balkan Wedding, where she took the role of Galina in 2009.

=== Magnificent Century ===
In 2010, Ahmet received the role of Nigar Kalfa in a primetime historical Turkish television series, Muhteşem Yüzyıl (The Magnificent Century). The show was very successful in the Balkan region and Turkey, and was broadcast in 45 countries. The series had 204 million viewers worldwide.

Her work with Muhteşem Yüzyıl brought her positive responses and acclaim from critics.

== Filmography ==
=== Movies ===
Year	Title
2020	Acı Kiraz
2018	Bal Kaymak
2018	Görevimiz Tatil
	Sonsuz Aşk
2014	Kendime İyi Bak
2014	Kadın İşi Banka Soygunu
2013	Mutlu Aile Defteri
	Aşk Tutulması
	Başka Semtin Çocukları
	Amor de familia

=== Series ===
Year	Title
2023	Vermem Seni Ellere
2022	Balkan Ninnisi
2020	Hekimoğlu
2019	Vurgun
2016–2017	Hayat Şarkısı
2014	Ruhumun Aynası
2011–2013	Muhteşem Yüzyıl
2009–2010	Balkan Düğünü
2007–2009	Elveda Rumeli
2002	Zavedeni
