= Ayas Mehmed Pasha =

Grand Vizier of the Ottoman Empire from 1536 to 1539

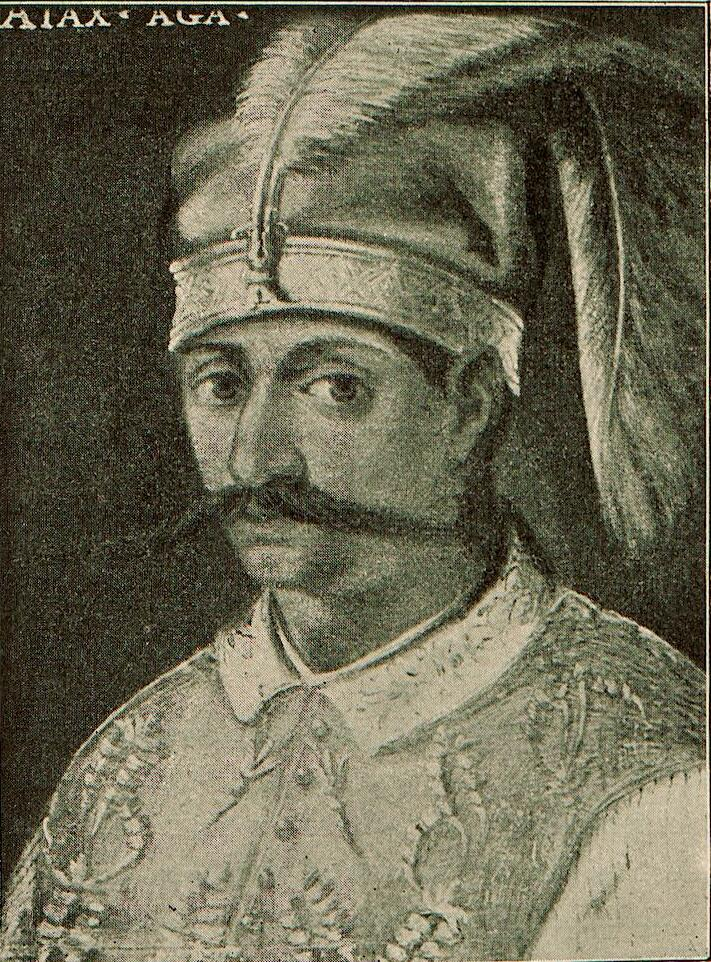

29th Grand Vizier of the Ottoman Empire
- In office 14 March 1536 – 13 July 1539
- Monarch: Suleiman I
- Preceded by: Pargalı Ibrahim Pasha
- Succeeded by: Lütfi Pasha

Personal details
- Born: 1483 Delvinë, Sanjak of Avlona, Ottoman Empire (modern Albania)
- Died: 1539 (aged 55–56) Istanbul, Ottoman Empire (modern Turkey)
- Ethnicity: Albanian

Ayas Mehmed Pasha (1483–1539) was an Ottoman statesman and grand vizier from 1536 to 1539.

He was an Albanian born in Delvinë (Sanjak of Avlona). His father was from the city of Shkodra, in the north of Albania, and his mother was from Vlorë, in the south of Albania. His father's name appears as Mehmed in both his tughra and his tombstone. He went to Istanbul while his father was living there, and following his orders entered Ottoman service under the Devshirme practice (as he was born Christian) and eventually became Agha of the Janissaries. He participated in the Battle of Chaldiran (1514) and the Ottoman–Mamluk War (1516–17). During 1520–1521 he was beylerbey of Anatolia Eyalet and governor of Damascus. During the reign of Suleiman the Magnificent, he served as beylerbey of Rumelia Eyalet and was made a vizier after the Ottoman conquest of Rhodes in 1522. He also participated in the Battle of Mohács, Siege of Vienna, and the war in Iraq (1534–1535).

He became grand vizier in 1536 after the execution of Pargalı Ibrahim Pasha and kept this position until his death in 1539. Under his administration, the Ottomans undertook the Corfu campaign (1537) and waged war against the Habsburgs in Vienna (1537–1540). Additionally, his native Vlorë region was put under full Ottoman control, and the Sanjak of Delvina was created. He died of plague in Istanbul and was buried in the Eyüp Sultan Mosque.

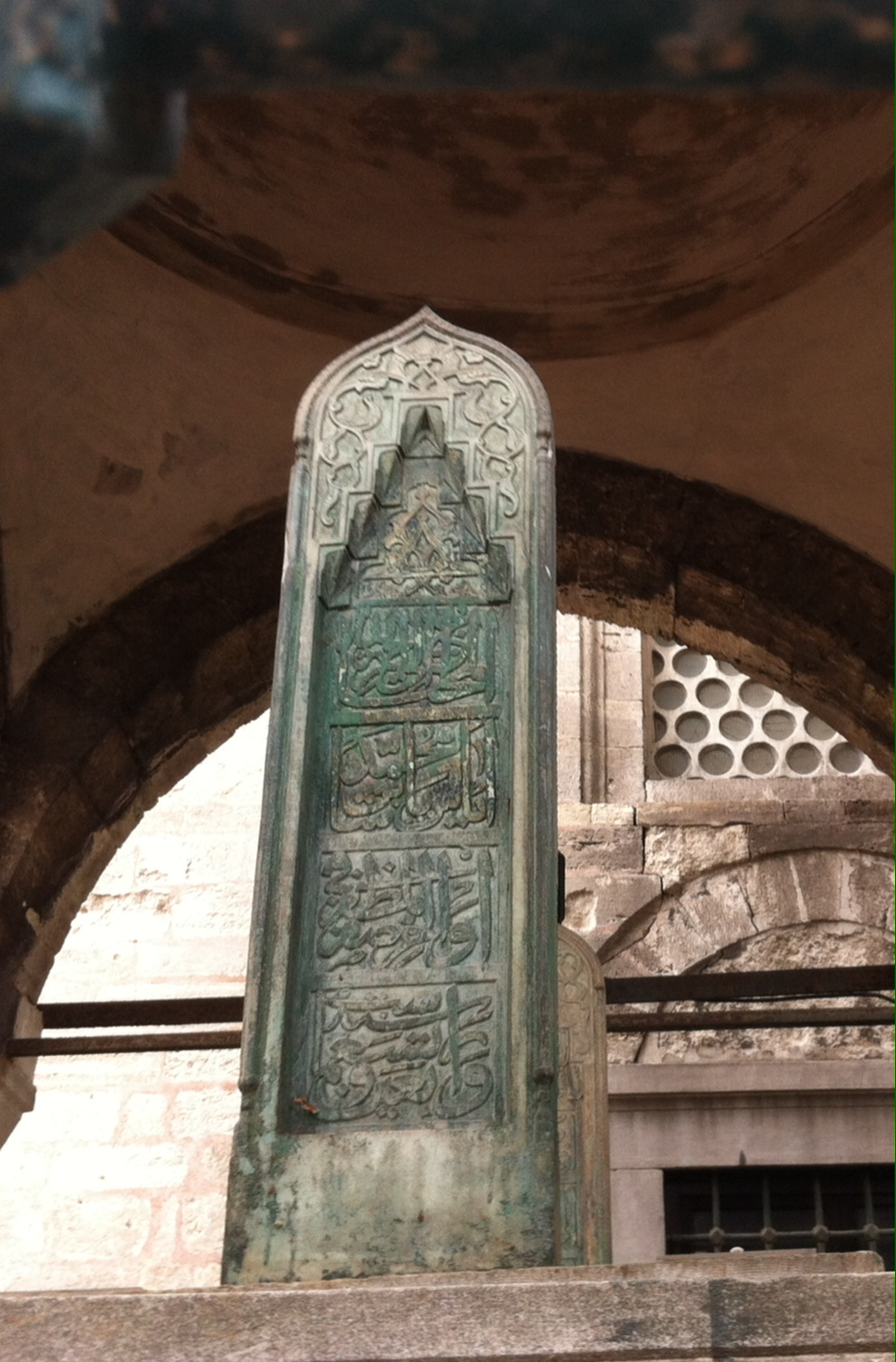
Tombstone of Ayas Mehmed Pasha at Eyüp Sultan Mosque Cemetery

== Depictions in literature and popular culture ==
In the TV series Muhteşem Yüzyıl, Ayas Mehmed Pasha is played by Turkish actor Fehmi Karaarslan.

== See also ==
- List of Ottoman grand viziers

Political offices
| Preceded by Pargalı Ibrahim Pasha | Grand Vizier of the Ottoman Empire; 14 March 1536 – 13 July 1539 | Succeeded by Lütfi Pasha |
