= Erhan Can Kartal =

Turkish actor

Erhan-Can Kartal
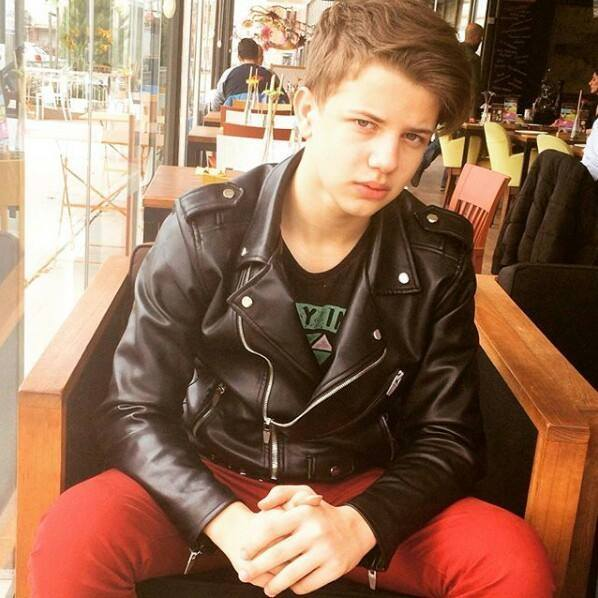
- Born: 17 December 1998 (age 27); Istanbul, Turkey
- Occupation: Actor
- Years active: 2010–present

Erhan Can Kartal (born 17 December 1998) is a Turkish actor who is known for portraying young Şehzade Bayezid in the TV series Muhteşem Yüzyıl.

== Early life and career ==
He began his career in 2010 in the Turkish TV series Ezel. In 2012, he acted in the film Kayıp and appeared in Beyaz Show. The same year, he was named Best Child Model in Turkey. He was featured in the series Medcezir in the role of Kadir.

He became better-known after acting in the 2013 TV series Muhteşem Yüzyıl in the role of Şehzade Bayezid, the fifth son of Suleiman the Magnificent, the brave child who loved adventure, freedom, and challenge.

== Filmography ==
Year	Title
2010–2011	Ezel
2012	Kayip
2013–2014	Medcezir
2013	Muhteşem Yüzyıl

== Awards and nominations ==
Year	Category	Nominated work	Result
2012	Best Child Model Turkey	Kayip	Won
