= Lütfi Pasha =

Grand Vizier of the Ottoman Empire from 1539 to 1541

Damat Çelebi Lütfi Pasha
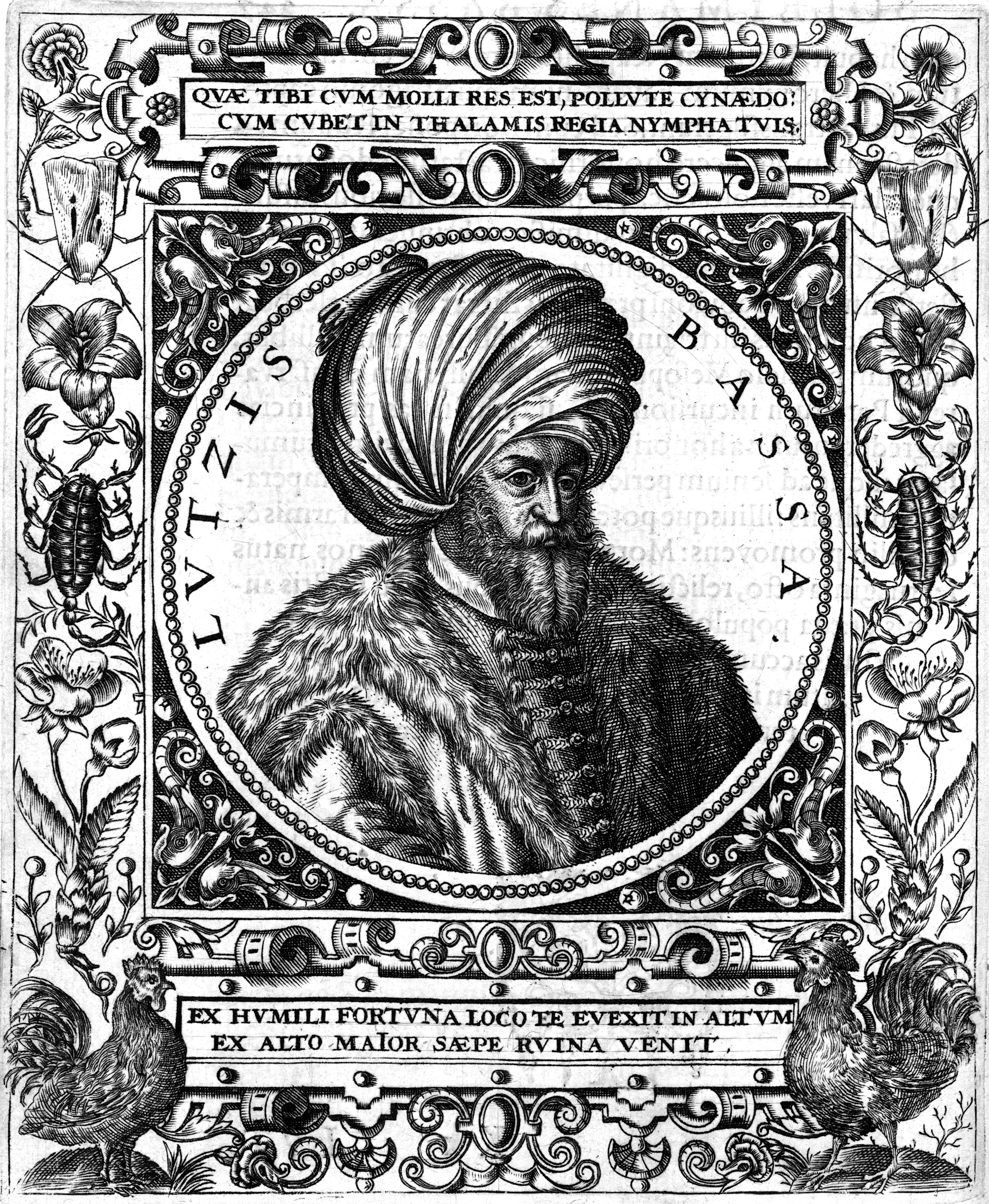
- An engraving of Lütfi Pasha by Johann Theodor de Bry, 1590s

30th Grand Vizier of the Ottoman Empire
- In office 13 July 1539 – April 1541
- Monarch: Suleiman I
- Preceded by: Ayas Mehmed Pasha
- Succeeded by: Hadım Suleiman Pasha

Personal details
- Born: c. 1488 Vlora, Albania
- Died: 27 March 1564 (aged 75-76) Didymoteicho (modern Greece)
- Spouse: Şah Sultan (m. 1523; div. 1541)
- Children: Esmehan Baharnaz Sultan

Lütfi Pasha (Ottoman Turkish: لطفى پاشا, Luṭfī Paşa; Modern Turkish: Lütfi Paşa, more fully Damat Çelebi Lütfi Paşa; c. 1488 – 27 March 1564, Didymoteicho) was an Ottoman-Albanian statesman, general, and Grand Vizier of the Ottoman Empire under Suleiman the Magnificent from 1539 to 1541. He wrote 21 works mainly on religious topics and history, 13 of them written in Arabic and eight in Turkish. Two of his works are the Asafname, a kind of mirror for ministers, and the Tevâriḫ-i Âl-i ‘Os̱mân, dealing with Ottoman history and including his own experiences in the reign of the sultans Bayezid II, Selim I and Suleyman I.

== Life ==
Lütfi was an Albanian from Vlora. He is thought to have been brought under Ottoman service as a devshirme, but his own writings indicate that his Christian parents sent him to the Bayazid II's harem-i hass, where he received a thorough education in Islam in order to advance in career.

His first appointment to service outside the palace was as sanjakbey of Kastamonu, and he subsequently became beylerbey of Karaman. Lütfi Pasha himself gave these details of his life in the introduction to his Asafname. However, he does not give the dates of his appointments and omits all details of his life before entering the Palace. He may also have served as sanjakbey first of Aydın and then of Yanya (Ioannina), since Feridun Bey mentions a Lütfi Bey who served at the siege of Rhodes in 1522 as sanjakbey of Aydın (Feridun Bey, Münşe'at al-selâtin, İstanbul 1274 AH/1857) and a Lütfi Bey who served at the siege of Vienna in 1529 as sanjakbey of Yanya (ibid. I, 573). These references may well be to Lütfi Pasha, the future Grand Vizier, since the latter himself stated to have participated in both these campaigns (Lütfi Pasha, Tevârih-i 'Al-i Osman, ed. Ali, İstanbul 1341/1922–3, 3). In his book he laid stress on the question of whether the Ottoman sultans who were non-Arab could assume the title of caliph or not.

In 941/1534–5 he became Third Vizier. By this time, he had, by his own account, served in Selim I's wars against the Safavids in Eastern Anatolia and against the Mamelukes in Syria and Egypt. Under Suleiman I, he took part in the campaigns of Belgrade in 1521 and Rhodes in 1522.

He became Grand Vizier of the Ottoman Empire in 1539 after the death of Ayas Mehmed Pasha (who held his position for three years following the execution of Pargalı Ibrahim Pasha). In 1541 he beat his wife, Şah Sultan, a half-sister of Suleiman, following her complaint of the pasha's overly harsh punishment of an adulteress. The princess divorced him with Suleiman's permission, and the sultan deposed him, naming Hadım Suleiman Pasha the new Grand Vizier.

== In media ==
In the TV series Muhteşem Yüzyıl, Lütfi Pasha is played by Turkish actor Mehmet Özgür.

== See also ==
- List of Ottoman grand viziers

Political offices
Preceded by Ayas Mehmed Pasha	Grand Vizier of the Ottoman Empire; 13 July 1539 – April 1541	Succeeded by Hadım Süleyman Pasha
