= Deniz Işın =

Turkish actress and screenwriter (born 1992)

- Born: 28 May 1992 (age 33); İzmir, Turkey
- Education: Ege University
- Occupation: Actress
- Years active: 2019–present

Deniz Işın (born 28 May 1992) is a Turkish actress and screenwriter.

== Life and career ==
Deniz Işın was born on 28 May 1992 in İzmir. She graduated with a bachelor's degree in chemical engineering from Ege University and got her master's degree in materials science and engineering from the same university.

She then took acting lessons for two years at Sahnetozu Theatre in İzmir and later spent a year studying acting in Istanbul. In 2017, she took part in an adaptation of Lysistrata, and in the following year she portrayed Alice in You Can't Take It with You. After appearing in a number of TV commercials, Işın made her television debut with FOX's Her Yerde Sen. She then had a supporting role on İyi Günde Kötü Günde before rising to prominence with her role as Sahra in Sefirin Kızı. Additionally, Işın was featured in the music video for Murat Boz's song "Gece". She became well known with her portrayal of the character İrem in the TV series Masumiyet.

She was chosen for the iconic role "Leyla" in hit surreal comedy series Leyla ile Mecnun, which came back on screens after 8 years. With Sarp Bozkurt, she wrote and played in short comedy series Eee Sonra/Bizden Olur Mu which was published on YouTube and later Blutv. She also appeared in the short film Ölüler İçin Yaşam Kılavuzu, which premiered in Cannes Film Festival. She had leading roles in action film Anka and comedy film Aşk Çağırırsan Gelir. In 2022, she starred in the series Sevmek Zamanı.

== Filmography ==
Television
Year	Title	Role	Notes	Network
2019	Her Yerde Sen	Merve Mutlu	Supporting role	FOX
2020	İyi Günde Kötü Günde	Seda	Supporting role	Star TV
2020	Sefirin Kızı	Dr. Sahra Yalçın	Supporting role	Star TV
2021	Masumiyet	İrem Orhun	Leading role	FOX
2022	Sevmek Zamanı	Firuze Yavuz	Leading role	ATV
2023	Dokuz Oğuz	Bilge Töreyeva	Leading role	FOX
2026–present	Sevdiğim Sensin	Nilüfer Aldur	Supporting role	Star TV
Streaming series and films
Year	Title	Role	Notles	Platform
2019	Atiye		Supporting role	Netflix
2020	Eee Sonra?	Deniz	Leading role	YouTube
2021–	Leyla ile Mecnun	Leyla	Leading role	Exxen
2022	Bizden Olur Mu?	Deniz	Leading role	BluTV
TBA	Kübra		Leading role	Netflix
Film
Year	Title	Role	Notes	
2022	Anka	Zümrüt	Leading role	
2022	Aşk Çağırırsan Gelir		Leading role	

=== Music video ===
Year	Singer	Song
2020	Murat Boz	"Gece"
