= Serkay Tütüncü =

Turkish actor (born 1991)

- Born: 7 February 1991 (age 35); Tire, İzmir, Turkey
- Education: Ege University; Manisa Celal Bayar University
- Occupation: Actor
- Years active: 2016–present

Serkay Tütüncü (born 7 February 1991) is a Turkish actor.

== Life and career ==
Serkay Tütüncü was born on 7 February 1991 in Tire, İzmir. His family is of Albanian descent. His father was a football player. Serkay Tütüncü is a graduate of Ege University and played soccer in İzmirspor, Balçovaspor, İzmir Police and Alaçatıspor teams in his youth.

In 2016, he took part in Survivor 2016 on TV8, and finished the competition as the runner-up. He started acting afterwards. In 2018, he made his television debut with the series İnsanlık Suçu. Between 2019 and 2020, he had a recurring role as Volkan on Kanal D's romantic comedy series Afili Aşk. He also had a supporting role on FOX's Bay Yanlış.

He had leading role in Masumiyet. In February 2022, he appeared as Alaz in the series Hayaller ve Hayatlar, which is broadcast on the beIN CONNECT digital platform in Turkey. With Melisa Döngel, he played in "Kusursuz Kiracı" and "Kirli Sepeti" for twice.

== Filmography ==
Web series
Year	Title	Role	Notes
2022	Hayaller ve Hayatlar	Alaz	Leading role
Tv Series
2018	İnsanlık Suçu	Gökhan Gökdemir	Supporting role
2019–2020	Afili Aşk	Volkan Çekerek	Supporting role
2020	Bay Yanlış	Ozan Dinçer	Supporting role
2021	Masumiyet	İlker Ilgaz	Leading role
2022	Kusursuz Kiracı	Yakup Ortaç	Leading role
2023	Kirli Sepeti	Kahraman Demir	Supporting role
2024	Sandık Kokusu	Kıvanç Yurt	Supporting role
Programming
Year	Title	Role	Notes
2016	Survivor 2016	Himself	Contestant
2016	Para Bende	Himself	Presenter
