= Şah Sultan (daughter of Selim I) =

Ottoman princess

- Born: c. 1500; Trabzon, Ottoman Empire
- Died: 1572 (aged 71–72); Istanbul, Ottoman Empire
- Burial: Yavuz Selim Mosque, Istanbul
- Spouse: Lütfi Pasha (m. 1523; div. 1541) Merkez Efendi (m. 1551; died 1552) (disputed)
- Issue: First Marriage; Esmehan Hanımsultan; Second Marriage; Ahmed Çelebi
Names
- English: Devlet Şahihuban Sultan; Ottoman Turkish: شاه سلطان
- Dynasty: Ottoman
- Father: Selim I
- Religion: Sunni Islam

Şah Sultan (Ottoman Turkish: شاه سلطان, also known as Şahıhuban, Şahi and Devlet Şah; c. 1500 – 1572) was an Ottoman princess, daughter of Sultan Selim I and the half-sister of Sultan Suleiman the Magnificent.

== Biography ==
She married Lütfi Pasha in around 1523. He was a historian, and author, and entered the palace through the child levy, that is, the forced Ottoman recruitment of some of the Empire's Christian children, who were converted and trained as janissaries. After 1512, he served as a governor in Anatolian and the Balkan provinces, actively participating in the initial siege of Vienna in 1529. His career continued to ascend as he received promotions, overseeing the beylerbeyliks of Karaman, Anatolia, and Rumelia from 1533 onwards. By 1536-37, Lütfi Pasha had become a vizier, ultimately reaching the zenith of his career in 1539 when he assumed the prestigious role of grand vizier. The two together had a daughter.

In 1541, she initiated a divorce from Lütfi Pasha, due to his involvement in a disturbing incident concerning the cruel treatment of a prostitute, which involved the mutilation of her genitals as punishment. Historian Mustafa Ali's account highlights that when Şah objected, Lütfi insisted on persisting with such punishments for prostitutes and resorted to physically assaulting the princess when she expressed her displeasure. Responding to Şah's plea, Suleiman granted her the divorce she sought and relieved Lütfi Pasha of his position as grand vizier, effectively concluding his official career. Opting not to remarry, Şah chose to return to the royal palace, adhering to the customary residence for a princess following the dissolution of her marriage.

According to some sources she later remarried to Merkez Efendi. The two had together had a son. According to the endowment records of Merkez Efendi, they had a son named Ahmed Çelebi from this marriage.

In 1555, she endowed a tekke in Eyüp, followed in 1556, by a mosque in her name also in Eyüp. In 1564, she endowed a school in Fatih.

== Death ==
She died in 1572 and was buried in her own mausoleum, inside her mosque in Eyüp. Buried beside her are her daughter, Esmehan, and granddaughters, Neslihan and Vasfihan.

== Issue ==
From her marriage to Lütfi Paşa, Şah Sultan had a daughter:

- Esmehan Hanımsultan (c. 1524 – 1556). She married Hüseyn Pasha and had two daughters:
  - Neslihan Hanım (born in 1546), married with issue;
  - Vasfihan Hanım (1549 – 1570), married with Küçük Ömer Ağa and had a son, Ahmed Bey.

From her marriage to Merkez Efendi, Şah Sultan had a son:

- Ahmed Çelebi

== In popular culture ==
- In the 2003 TV miniseries Hürrem Sultan, Şah Sultan is portrayed by Turkish actress Yeliz Doğramacılar.
- In the 2011 TV series Muhteşem Yüzyıl, Şah Sultan is played by Turkish actress Deniz Çakır. She is portrayed in the show as the daughter of Hafsa Sultan and full sister of Suleiman.

== Annotations ==
1. Also known as Şahıhuban, Şahi and Devlet Şahi.
