= Mehmet Aslantuğ =

Turkish actor (born 1961)

- Born: 25 September 1961 (age 64); Samsun, Turkey
- Occupations: Actor; director; producer; screenwriter
- Years active: 1981–present
- Spouse: Arzum Onan (m. 1996; div. 2023)
- Children: 1

Mehmet Aslantuğ (born 25 September 1961) is a Turkish actor, director, producer and screenwriter of Circassian origin. He has received a Golden Boll Award, a Golden Objective Award, three Golden Orange Awards, and four Golden Butterfly Awards.

== Early life and career ==
Aslantuğ was born in 1961 to Circassian parents from Turkey. He has appeared in more than 30 films and television shows since 1981. He starred in Akrebin Yolculuğu, which was screened in the Un Certain Regard section at the 1997 Cannes Film Festival.

In April 2011, it was announced Aslantuğ would portray the role of Çerkez Ethem in an upcoming Mohy Quandour film.

== Filmography ==
=== Film ===
| Year | Film | Role | Notes |
|---|---|---|---|
| 1981 | Aşka Dönüş | | |
| 1985 | Akrep Burcu | | |
| 1986 | Gün Doğmadan | | |
| 1987 | Ateş Böceği | Yılmaz | |
| 1992 | Kapıları Açmak | | |
| 1993 | Yalancı | | |
| 1994 | Yengeç Sepeti | | |
| 1994 | Gerilla | Gerilla Mehmet | |
| 1995 | Bir Kadının Anatomisi | | |
| 1997 | Yeni Bir Yıldız | | TV film |
| 1997 | Akrebin Yolculuğu | Kerem | |
| 2006 | Ankara Cinayeti | Suat Nedim | |
| 2010 | Aşkın İkinci Yarısı | Arif | Actor, director, producer, and screenwriter |

=== Television ===
| Year | Film | Role | Notes |
|---|---|---|---|
| 1987 | Yeniden Doğmak | Hanım Ağa | mini series |
| 1987 | Sevgi Dünyası | | Video |
| 1987–1988 | Belene | Ahmet the Teacher | mini series |
| 1989–1990 | İz Peşinde | Tuncer | mini series |
| 1990 | Başka Olur Ağaların Düğünü | Dr. Murat | mini series |
| 1990 | Vurguna İnmek | | mini series |
| 1992 | Kopuk Dünyalar | Kasap Mehmet | mini series |
| 1994 | Kurtuluş | Captain Fazıl Bey | mini series |
| 1997–1999 | Sıcak Saatler | Sedat Yalçın | |
| 2000 | Merdoğlu | Ömer Merdoğlu | mini series |
| 2001 | Hırsız | Adil Alemdar | mini series |
| 2003–2005 | Bir İstanbul Masalı | Selim Arhan | |
| 2009 | Hanımın Çiftliği | Muzaffer Dinçaslan | |
| 2011 | Canım Babam | Kerem | |
| 2012 | Veda | Reşat Bey, Ottoman Minister of Finance | |
| 2013 | Ben Onu Çok Sevdim | Adnan Menderes, Turkish Prime Minister | |
| 2015 | Aşkın Kokusu | Aziz | |
| 2016 | Kördüğüm | Enver | |
| 2019 | Kardeş Çocukları | Yıldırım Saner | |
| 2021 | Masumiyet | Harun Orhun | |
| 2022–2023 | Yürek Çıkmazı | Ali Fuat | |

== Selected awards and nominations ==
| Year | Award | Category | Nominated work | Result |
|---|---|---|---|---|
| 1990 | Golden Butterfly Award | | | Won |
| 1992 | Golden Orange Award | Best Actor | Kapıları Açmak | Won |
| 1993 | Golden Orange Award | Best Actor | Yalancı | Won |
| 1994 | Golden Butterfly Award | | | Won |
| 1994 | Golden Orange Award | Best Actor | Yengeç Sepeti | Won |
| 1994 | Golden Boll Award | Best Actor | Yalancı | Won |
| 1995 | Contemporary Cinema Actors | | | Won |
| 1997 | Golden Butterfly Award | | | Won |
| 1998 | Golden Objective Award | | | Won |
| 2005 | White Pearl Television Award | Best Actor | Bir İstanbul Masalı | Won |
| 2006 | Golden Butterfly Award | | | Won |
| 2010 | Broadcast Television Journalists Association Oscar | Best Actor | Hanımın Çiftliği | Won |
