= Deniz Çakır =

Turkish actress (born 1981)

- Born: 31 December 1981 (age 44); Ankara, Turkey
- Education: Hacettepe University Ankara State Conservatory (theatre department)
- Occupation: Actress
- Years active: 2004–present
- Spouse: Bilgehan Baykal (m. 2023)
- Website: denizcakir.com.tr

Deniz Çakır (born 31 December 1981) is a Turkish film and television actress.

== Career ==
She made her television debut with her role as Alev in hit revenge series Kadın İsterse. Çakır is best known for her role in the popular television series, Muhteşem Yüzyıl as Şah Sultan, and for her character Ferhunde in hit series Yaprak Dökümü based on a classic novel. She is especially known for her role in the popular TV series Eşkıya Dünyaya Hükümdar Olmaz as Meryem Çakırbeyli. She also acted in period series Yasak based on Fatma Aliye Topuz's novel Muharadat.

== Filmography ==
Film
Year	Title	Role	Notes
2009	How Are You?	Lidya	
2009	40	Sevda	
2011	Ya Sonra	Didem	

Web series
Year	Title	Role	Note
2022	Aslında Özgürsün	Berna	Main role
TV series
Year	Title	Role	Note
2004–2006	Kadın İsterse	Alev	Supporting role
2005	İki Arada Aşk	Gizem	Main role
2006–2010	Yaprak Dökümü	Ferhunde	Supporting role
2006	Avrupa Yakası	Serap	Guest role
2006	Evet Benim / İşte Benim	"Barmaid" Funda	
2011	İffet	İffet	Main role
2013	Muhteşem Yüzyıl	Şah Sultan	Main role
2014	Yasak	Calibe	Main role
2015–2018	A Bandit Cannot Rule the World (Eşkıya Dünyaya Hükümdar Olmaz)	Meryem Çakırbeyli	Main role
2019	Vurgun	Reyhan Vardar	Main role
2021	Masumiyet	Bahar Yüksel	Main role
2025	Çarpıntı	Hülya Güneş	Main role
2027	Mükemmel Anneler	Neslihan	Main role

=== Turkish Dubbing ===
Voice
Year	Title	Role	Notes
2008	Kung Fu Panda	Usta Engerek	Turkish voiceover
2008	Donkey Xote		Turkish voiceover
2008	The Simpsons Movie	Rod ve Todd Flanders	Turkish voiceover
2008	Iron Man	Virginia "Pepper" Potts	Turkish voiceover
2010	Iron Man 2	Virginia "Pepper" Potts	Turkish voiceover
2015	Konuşan Resimler	Sergi	Turkish voiceover

=== Theatre ===
Theatre
Year	Title	Role	Notes
2011	Cam	İpek	
