= Hadım Suleiman Pasha =

Grand Vizier of the Ottoman Empire from 1541 to 1544

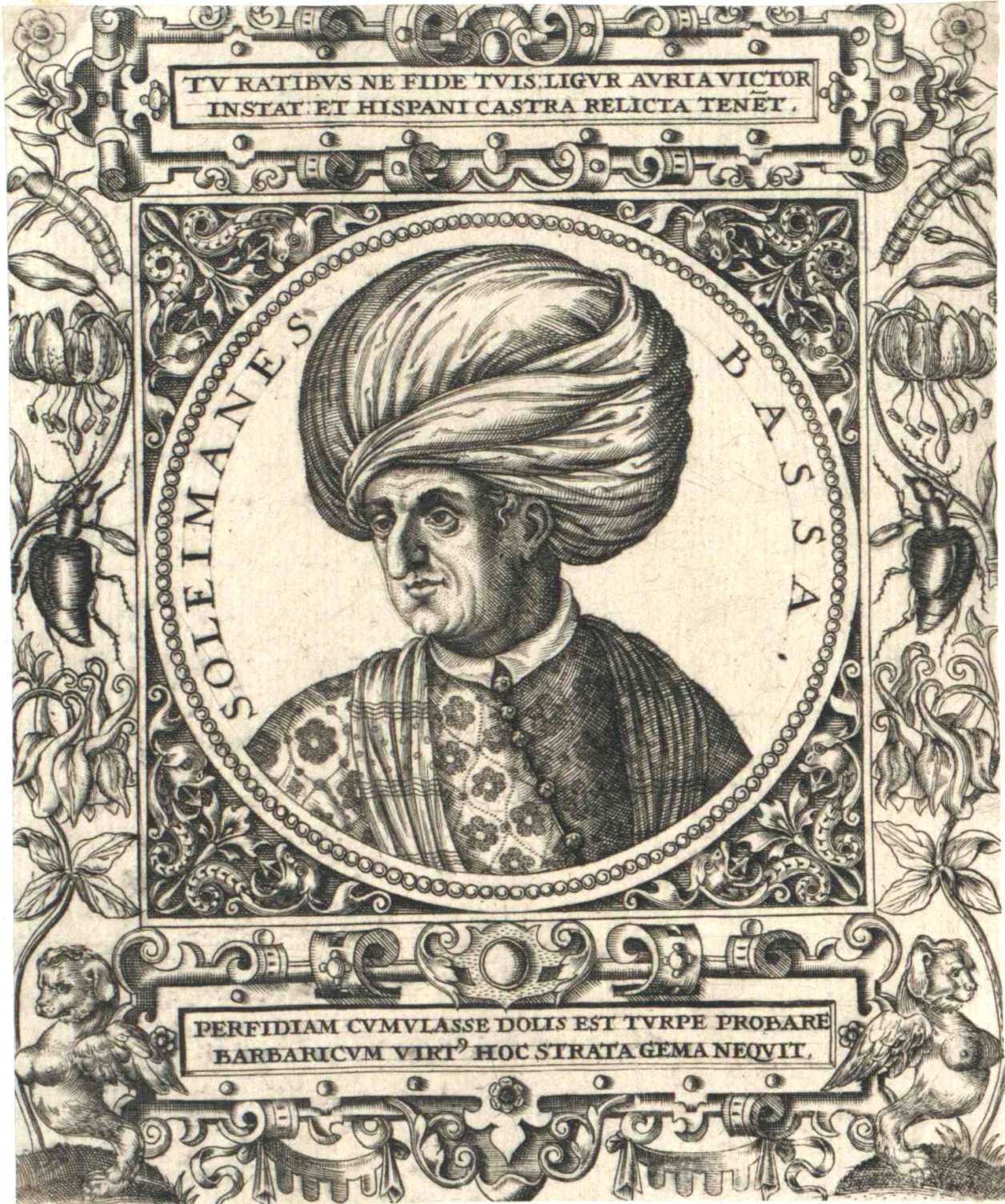

31st Grand Vizier of the Ottoman Empire
- In office April 1541 – 28 November 1544
- Monarch: Suleiman I
- Preceded by: Lütfi Pasha
- Succeeded by: Rüstem Pasha

Ottoman Governor of Egypt
- In office 1537–1538
- Preceded by: Divane Hüsrev Pasha
- Succeeded by: Davud Pasha
- In office 1525–1535
- Preceded by: Güzelce Kasım Pasha
- Succeeded by: Divane Hüsrev Pasha

Personal details
- Born: c. 1467
- Died: September 1547 (aged 79–80) Malkara, Sanjak of Vize, Ottoman Empire

Hadım (Eunuch) Suleiman Pasha (Ottoman Turkish: خادم سلیمان پاشا; Turkish: Hadım Süleyman Paşa; c. 1467 – September 1547) was an Ottoman statesman and military commander of Greek descent. He served as the governor of Ottoman Egypt in 1525–1535.

He was nominated governor of Baghdad in 1535–1536 after the recent Capture of Baghdad (1534). He was appointed to Buda in 1536, then to Damascus in 1537.

He again served as the governor of Ottoman Egypt in 1537–1538. The Ottoman Sultan Suleiman the Magnificent ordered Suleiman Pasha as governor of Egypt to conduct a naval expedition in the Indian Ocean, where he led the capture of Aden and the siege of Diu (in Portuguese India) in 1538. Suleiman Pasha was a benefactor of his long-serving successor in the Egyptian governorship, Davud Pasha (served 1538–1549), whom he championed for the role to spite his rival and colleague, Rüstem Pasha.

Suleiman Pasha was designated as governor of Aleppo in 1539–1540. He finally became Grand Vizier of the Ottoman Empire between 1541 and 1544. He was a eunuch.

== See also ==
- Ottoman naval expeditions in the Indian Ocean
- List of Ottoman grand viziers
- List of Ottoman governors of Egypt

== Sources ==
- Taner, Melis (2020). "Illustrated Manuscripts Attributed to Baghdad". Caught in a whirlwind: a cultural history of Ottoman Baghdad as reflected in its illustrated manuscripts. Leiden; Boston: Brill. ISBN 978-9004412699.

Political offices
Preceded by Güzelce Kasım Pasha	Ottoman Governor of Egypt; 1525–1535	Succeeded by Divane Hüsrev Pasha
Preceded by Divane Hüsrev Pasha	Ottoman Governor of Egypt; 1537–1538	Succeeded by Davud Pasha
Preceded by Lütfi Pasha	Grand Vizier of the Ottoman Empire; April 1541 – 28 November 1544	Succeeded by Rüstem Pasha
