= Davud Pasha (governor of Egypt) =

Davud Pasha (sometimes spelled Da'ud Pasha; died September 1549) was an Ottoman statesman who was the Ottoman governor of Egypt from April 1538 to September 1549.

He was a good friend of his predecessor of the office, Hadım Suleiman Pasha, who helped him get the position. The two men shared a long-standing feud with Rüstem Pasha.

Davud Pasha died in office in September 1549, after holding the Egypt governorship for over 11 years.

== See also ==
- List of Ottoman governors of Egypt

Political offices
Preceded by Hadım Süleyman Pasha	Ottoman Governor of Egypt; April 1538 – September 1549	Succeeded by Lala Kara Mustafa Pasha as acting Governor
