= Rüstem Pasha Caravanserai =

Rüstem Pasha Caravanserai may refer to:

- Rüstem Pasha Caravanserai (Edirne)
- Rüstem Pasha Caravanserai (Erzurum)
- Rüstem Pasha Caravanserai (Ereğli)
