= Rüstem Pasha =

Grand Vizier of the Ottoman Empire (1544–1553, 1555–1561)

Damat Rüstem Opuković Pasha
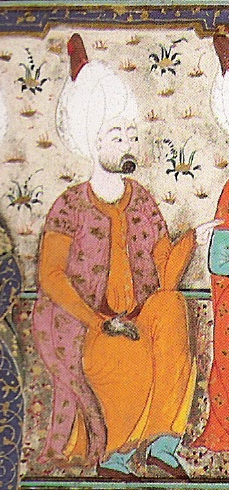

32nd Grand Vizier of the Ottoman Empire
- In office 28 November 1544 – 6 October 1553
- Monarch: Suleiman I
- Preceded by: Hadım Süleyman Pasha
- Succeeded by: Kara Ahmed Pasha
- In office 29 September 1555 – 10 July 1561
- Monarch: Süleyman I
- Preceded by: Kara Ahmed Pasha
- Succeeded by: Semiz Ali Pasha

Personal details
- Born: c. 1505 Skradin or Sarajevo or Makarska or elsewhere
- Died: 10 July 1561 (aged 55–56) Constantinople, Ottoman Empire (now Istanbul, Turkey)
- Resting place: Şehzade Mosque
- Spouse: Mihrimah Sultan (m. 1539)
- Relations: Sinan Pasha (brother)
- Children: Ayşe Hümaşah Sultan; Sultanzade Osman Bey

Rüstem Pasha (Turkish pronunciation: [ɾysˈtæm pa.ʃa]; Ottoman Turkish: رستم پاشا; c. 1505 – 10 July 1561) was an Ottoman statesman who served as Grand Vizier to Sultan Süleyman the Magnificent. He is also known as Damat Rüstem Pasha (the epithet damat meaning 'son-in-law') as a result of his marriage to the sultan's only daughter, Mihrimah Sultan, in 1539. He is regarded as one of the most influential and successful grand viziers of the Ottoman Empire.

Rüstem Pasha was taken as a child to Constantinople (modern-day Istanbul), where he built a military and bureaucratic career under the protection of Hürrem Sultan, Süleyman's favorite and legal wife and Mihrimah's mother. His brother Sinan Pasha was an Ottoman grand admiral.

== Early life ==
In a diplomatic contact with Cardinal Antun Vrančić he referred to his mother tongue as Croatian, indicating his Croatian ethnic origin background. He was also referred to as a Bosnian origin by Tayib Osman-zade Ahmed, author of Hadikatul vuzara and the Turkish encyclopedia Kamus-ul-alam, and by the Turkish historiographer Mustafa Âlî. However, other sources suggest different Croatian, Bosnian or Serbian birthplaces.

Rustem Pasha was forcibly recruited through the Devşirme system from Christian parents in the Balkans and brought to Constantinople as a child. There, he studied at Enderun, an institute for the education of talented boys. By the time they graduated, the boys were proficient in at least three languages, had knowledge of contemporary developments in science and finance and had received training in both military leadership and close combat skills.

An extremely ambitious man, Rüstem owed his career's success to the support of Hurrem Sultan, the wife of Sultan Süleyman the Magnificent. In 1526, he took part in the Battle of Mohacs as a silahdar (a weapon bearer in an elite cavalry division of the Ottoman army). A few years later, he advanced to mirahur-i evvel ağa (chief supervisor of the sultan's stables) and then rikab-dar (the stirrup holder when the sultan mounted his horse). The mirahur accompanied the Sultan during his travels, so Süleyman knew Rüstem for a long time before he appointed him – possibly inspired by Hürrem – to be a tutor to his sons. In making this decision, he was surely influenced by Rüstem's character. Most historical sources describe Rüstem as a calm and reasonable man with a keen intellect, who always kept a cool head, and who was devoted to his ruler.

== Political career ==
Rüstem Pasha was a sanjak bey who was promoted to become Beylerbey of Diyarbakir. By the time he married Mihrimah Sultan, he was already a vizier. Süleyman the Magnificent appointed him grand vizier for the first time in 1544 but in 1553 he was dismissed, only to recover the position in 1555, holding on to it until his death in 1561.

As a diplomat, Rüstem initiated many trade agreements with European countries and India. His biggest success was the agreement, signed in 1547, with King Ferdinand I and the Emperor Charles V, which confirmed, without firing a shot, the western border of the Ottoman Empire for more than fourteen years. Ferdinand renounced his claim to the Kingdom of Hungary and agreed to pay a tax of 30,000 gold ducats a year to the Ottoman treasury. The Emperor's ambassador Ogier Ghiselin de Busbecq wrote that Charles tried to renegotiate the unfavourable agreement several times but that Rüstem always resisted. Rüstem also worked on the agreement with the Safavids, which, in 1544, ended the long-standing Ottoman-Safavid wars, and secured the eastern borders of the Ottoman Empire.

In 1536 Süleyman had his grand vizier Pargalı Ibrahim Pasha executed for complicated reasons (including having used a seal with the inscription 'Sultan Ibrahim' and retaining most of the confiscated property of Süleyman's Minister of Finance İskender Çelebi, whose execution he had ordered, etc.). Ibrahim was replaced with Ayas Mehmed Pasha, followed in turn by Lütfi Pasha and Hadım Suleiman Pasha. Rüstem Pasha became Grand Vizier eight years after Ibrahim's death.

=== The death of Şehzade Mustafa ===
Later Hurrem and Rüstem conspired against the ambitious crown prince Şehzade Mustafa (Süleyman's son by Mahidevran Hatun) in favour of Şehzade Mehmed (Süleyman's son by Hürrem). Mustafa made the mistake of frequently receiving foreign ambassadors and Ottoman commanders without his father's knowledge, and was regarded by them as an important ally against Süleyman. The Austrian ambassador Ghiselin de Busbecq (visiting Mustafa before Süleyman), informed his ruler: "Mustafa will be an excellent sultan, receptive and open to talks." And the Papal ambassador Navagero said: "Mustafa lives with his mother. She says that people adore him." Understanding the danger of the situation, Süleyman remembered how his father Selim I had dethroned his grandfather Bayezid II (who was killed only a month after his abdication in 1512). Officers loyal to the sultan warned him that a part of the army was getting ready to put Mustafa on the throne. In 1552, while preparing a campaign against Persia, Süleyman appointed Rüstem Serasker (commander-in-chief) of the campaign. But soldiers assembled in the military camp in Karaman (in Central Anatolia), rejected the appointment and insisted that Rüstem should be replaced by Mustafa (Rüstem's brother, Sinan Pasha, as admiral of the Ottoman fleet during the Tripolis siege, faced much the same problem although he still won many victories before his death in 1553).

The intrigue continued with Mustafa's often-cited correspondence with the Safavids being signed 'Sultan Mustafa' (still available today in the archives), which may or may not have been relevant. The correspondence might have been authentic; or, it might have been a Safavid or a Hürrem-Rüstem deception; or, it might have been Süleyman's attempt to calm down public opinion after Mustafa's death. Various reports describe Mustafa's death in the Ereğli valley. According to one, Rüstem Pasha asked Mustafa to join his father's army and at the same time warned Süleyman that Mustafa was coming to kill him. According to another, it was Süleyman himself who summoned his son to Ereğli, and Mustafa came, "confident that the army would protect him".

Only Rüstem appears as the antagonist in all the versions. Even the report of the Austrian ambassador de Busbecq, who claims to have received an account from an eyewitness, had the same origin. Suspended and banished, Rüstem was fair game for taking the blame. No one dared to criticize the Sultan himself. Probably realizing this, Süleyman recalled Rüstem to his post two years later.

Rüstem's scapegoating as the seemingly dominant figure in the 'conspiracy against Mustafa' radically changed public opinion. And so the Rüstem, who had been extolled as the 'pillar of the Ottoman Empire,' as a brilliant economist and a sophisticated statesman, was forgotten along with all his great projects and charitable foundations. Instead he became reviled as Rüstem the 'black heart, the murderer of the loved Prince Mustafa'. Rumors spread about his 'dirty' origin and about possible bribe-taking, and he was slandered as 'the louse of fortune'. Some foreign ambassadors, like Ghiselin de Busbecq or Bernardo Navagero, repeated these slurs in their reports. On the other hand, Jean Chesneau, the secretary of the French ambassador, did write, 'The grand vizier is a man of humble origin who, thanks to his talent and will, worked his way up from nothing. He is an agreeable companion, engaging your interest with his acute faculty of judgment, an insightful way of thinking, and magnanimous manners. During the negotiations, he is calm and dispassionate, although determined in his views.'

Taşlıcalı Yahya Bey's elegy, the reports of ambassadors, administrative dossiers, foundation charters and some private documents like Hurrem's and Mihrimah's plea to Süleyman when Rüstem was expelled to Üsküdar, are the only contemporary sources reporting on Rüstem's life. They were also the basis of the oft-cited İbrāhīm Peçevī's work 'Tārīḫ-i Peçevī', published eighty years after Rüstem's death.

== Marriage ==
Mihrimah Sultan was married to Rüstem, the governor of Diyarbakır, in 1539. By then Rüstem was already a wealthy man and had, since 1538, a splendid career as Governor of Anatolia, one of the two most important administrative regions in the Ottoman Empire, and a post seen as a stepping-stone on the way to becoming Grand Vizier. Mihrimah already knew Rüstem for as the mentor of her brothers and the adviser of her father. After their marriage, he was nominated to the vizierate in November 1544.

Rüstem supported Mihrimah's charitable foundations including the Mihrimah Sultan İskele Camii (Mihrimah Sultan Mosque in Üsküdar where her brother-in-law Sinan Pasha was buried in 1553). He was also Mihrimah's ally, particularly concerning political and financial decisions. His will offers evidence of his confidence in his wife. Rüstem and Mihrimah had a daughter, Ayşe Hümaşah Sultan (1541–1598), firstly married in 1557 to Semiz Ahmed Pasha, and at least one son, Sultanzade Osman Bey (1546–1576, buried in his father's türbe, in the Şehzade Mosque).

== Wealth and legacy ==
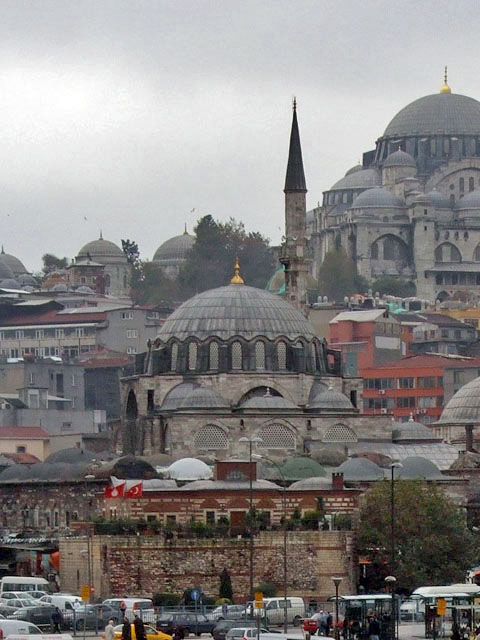
Rüstem Pasha Mosque

As Grand Vizier, Rüstem amassed vast wealth and he was the first Grand Vizier in the history of the Ottoman Empire who contributed to the development of the state from his own funds. According to most contemporary testimonies (excluding Taşlıcalı Yahya Bey's Şehzade Mustafa Mersiyesi), he was one of the few state dignitaries who didn't take bribes. He was very wealthy even before his marriage to Mihrimah Sultan. In his will (a part of an endowment charter from 1561), Rüstem left a complete inventory of his property in the hope of securing his great foundation projects after his death. His testament determined exactly which part of his property belonged to the state, to his foundations, to Hurrem Sultan's foundation and to Mihrimah's foundations, as well as what he left to his wife Mihrimah and to their daughter Ayşe Hümaşah Sultan. In an act of faith in her abilities, he nominated his wife Mihrimah Sultan as executor of his will and his daughter as the executor and administrator of his foundations.

Most historians emphasise how hard Rüstem worked to consolidate and improve the troubled economy of the Ottoman Empire which had been impoverished by excessive spending on wars and the lavish lifestyle of the court. Contemporary documents say that he also financed this upswing from his own resources. Toll-free bridges, roads, covered bazaars, granaries, baths, hospices, caravanserais, convents, schools and various other establishments were built on his lands for the public benefit. Their funding was largely secured by the leasing of Rüstem's estates. He supported agriculture, founded new trading centres, like the bazaar in Sarajevo, and established silk factories in Bursa and Istanbul, and assorted social and educational institutions. He developed the domestic economy by encouraging major public works projects such as water distribution systems in Istanbul, Mecca and Jerusalem.

He also found enough money to finance the building of the Süleymaniye Mosque (1550–57) as well as other monumental architectural projects designed by the architect Mimar Sinan. To reduce protectionism in the state administration, an official instalment fee was introduced, and confiscated when an official abused his authority. However, his reform of the military remained unfinished. At the time of his death in Constantinople on 10 July 1561, his personal property included 815 plots of land in Rumelia and Anatolia, 476 mills, 1700 slaves, 2,900 war horses, 1,106 camels, 800 gold embroidery Holy Qur'ans, 500 books, 5000 caftans, 130 pieces of armours, 860 gold embroidered swords, 1500 silver tolga (helmets), 1000 silver balls, 33 precious jewels etc.

== Death ==
Rüstem Pasha died of hydrocephalus on 10 July 1561. He was buried in the Sehzade Mosque (which was dedicated to Süleyman and Hürrem's son, Şehzade Mehmed) because his dream project, the Rüstem Pasha Mosque, had not yet been built. His tomb sits alongside that of Şehzade Mehmed.

=== Rüstem Pasha Mosque ===
After her husband's death, Mihrimah completed his work including the construction of the eponymous Rüstem Pasha Mosque (Turkish: Rüstem Paşa Camii) which can be found in the Hasırcılar Çarşısı (Strawmat Weavers Market) in Tahtakale in the Fatih district of Istanbul. It was designed by the Ottoman imperial architect Mimar Sinan and built between 1561 and 1563. With its tiled interior and exterior, it is widely regarded as one of Sinan's most beautiful mosques.

Other buildings in Istanbul that bear the grand vizier's name are the Rüstem Paşa Medresesi (1550, another work of Mimar Sinan) in Çağaloğlu, and the Rüstem Paşa Han (1544–1550, also by Mimar Sinan) in Karaköy.

== In popular culture ==
In the Turkish television series Muhteşem Yüzyıl (The Magnificent Century), Rüstem Pasha is portrayed by actor Ozan Güven.

== See also ==
- List of Ottoman grand viziers
- Rüstem Pasha Caravanserai, Erzurum
- Rüstem Pasha Caravanserai (Edirne), Edirne
- Rüstem Pasha Caravanserai (Ereğli), Ereğli, Konya
- Rüstem Pasha Medrese, Fatih, Istanbul
- Rüstem Pasha Medrese (Kütahya)
- Rustem Pasha Mosque

Political offices
Preceded by Hadım Süleyman Pasha	Grand Vizier of the Ottoman Empire; 28 November 1544 – 6 October 1553	Succeeded by Kara Ahmed Pasha
Preceded by Kara Ahmed Pasha	Grand Vizier of the Ottoman Empire; 29 September 1555 – 10 July 1561	Succeeded by Semiz Ali Pasha
