= Rüstem Pasha Mosque =

Mosque in Istanbul, Turkey

Rüstem Pasha Islamic cultural center
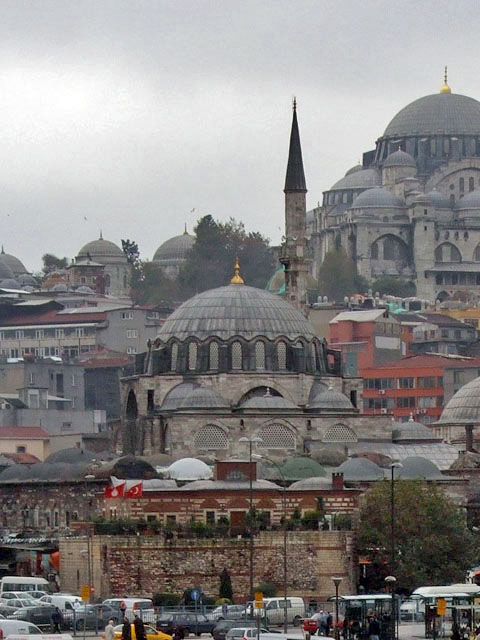
- Rüstem Pasha Mosque (in foreground)

- Location within the Fatih district of Istanbul

Religion
- Affiliation: Islam

Location
- Location: Istanbul, Turkey
- Coordinates: 41°01′03″N 28°58′07″E

Architecture
- Architect: Mimar Sinan
- Type: Ottoman-era mosque
- Groundbreaking: 1561; 465 years ago
- Completed: 1563; 463 years ago

Specifications
- Minaret: 1
- Materials: granite, marble

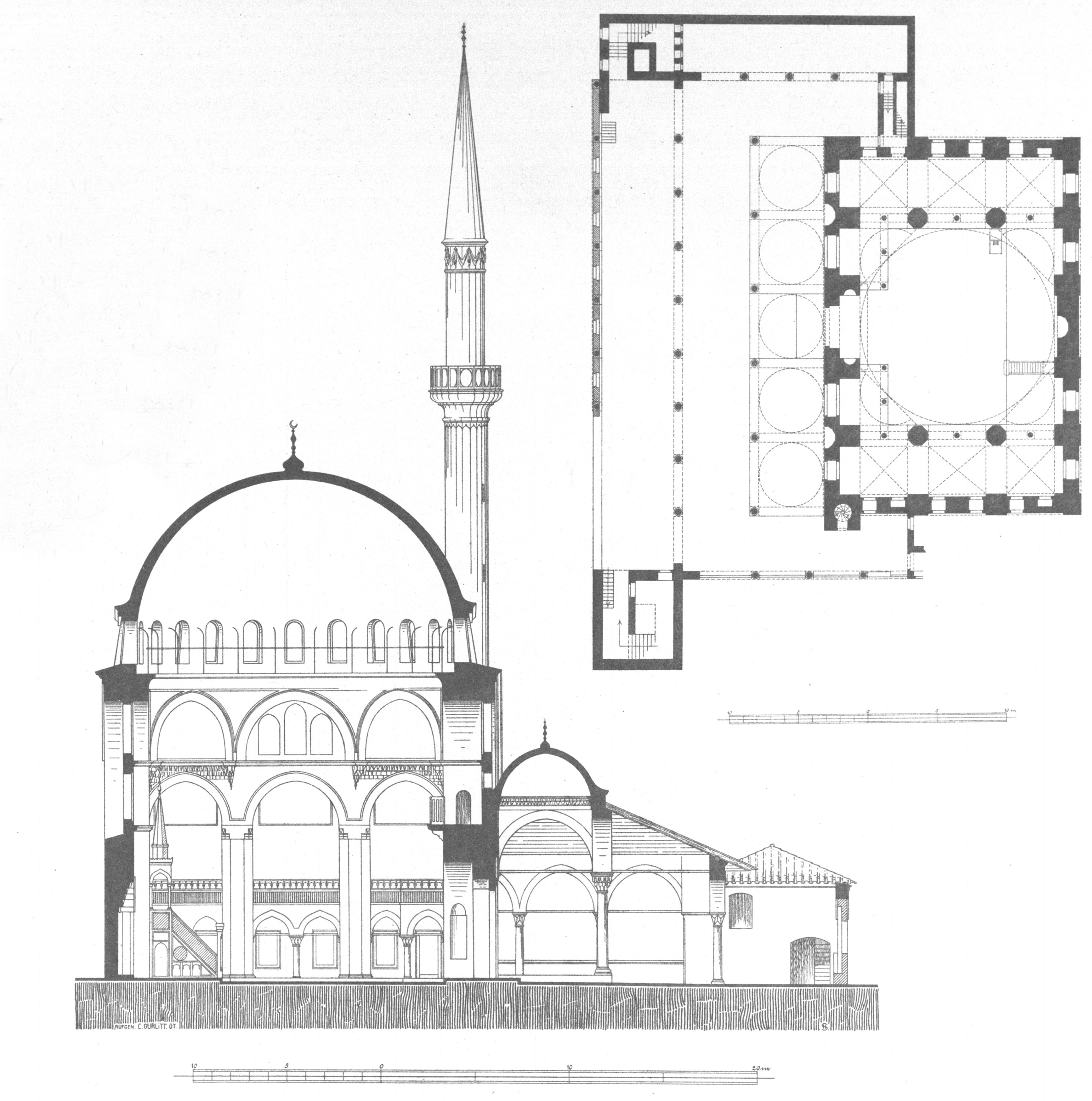
Section and plan of the mosque published by Cornelius Gurlitt in 1912

The Rüstem Pasha Mosque (Turkish: Rüstem Paşa Camii) is an Ottoman mosque located in the Hasırcılar Çarşısı (Strawmat Weavers Market) in the Tahtakale neighborhood of the Fatih district of Istanbul, Turkey, near the Spice Bazaar. Named after Rüstem Pasha, who served as Grand Vizier of the Ottoman Empire under Sultan Suleiman I, it was designed by the Ottoman imperial architect Mimar Sinan and completed in around 1563.

The mosque is noted for the many different designs of İznik tiles that cover almost every vertical surface both in the interior and under the entrance porch.

== History ==
=== Rüstem Pasha ===
The Rüstem Pasha Mosque was designed by Ottoman imperial architect Mimar Sinan for the Grand Vizier Rüstem Pasha. Rüstem Pasha was the husband of Mihrimah Sultan, the daughters of Suleiman the Magnificent by Hurrem Sultan, and served as Grand Vizier (a role comparable to a European prime minister) from 1544 to 1553 and from 1555 to 1561.

Rüstem Pasha commissioned a number of important buildings, including religious schools, mosques, and other structures. Before his death in 1561, he hoped to construct a final mosque of his own in Istanbul — in part to repair his controversial legacy — though the extent to which he had outlined his intentions for the eponymous mosque remains ambiguous.

Sultan Suleiman I authorized the project in 1562 after the Grand Vizier's death. It was assigned to the Ottoman's chief architect, Mimar Sinan. The Rüstem Pasha Mosque is unique among Sinan's many mosques for the lavishly decorated, tiled interior. Rüstem Pasha may have ordered the mosque's characteristic İznik tiles in order to support court designer Kara Memi, who was known for elegant floral designs.

=== Dating the mosque ===
Efforts to precisely date the Rüstem Pasha Mosque have proved difficult, in part because of the lack of a foundation inscription. Michael D. Willis’ analysis of its İznik tiles suggest that they date to 1555. Other sources suggest that some of them could have been crafted after Rüstem Pasha's death in 1561. More recent analyses of primary sources has determined that the mosque was probably built between 1561 and 1563. Plans for the mosque were only set in motion beginning in 1561, and deeds for the purchase of land date to 1562. One water deed implies that the mosque was incomplete in December 1562, so the mosque was likely only operational by late 1563.

=== Usage ===
The Rüstem Pasha Mosque was originally designed as a Friday mosque, as reflected in Suleiman's ferman (his imperial command ordering construction of the mosque). More recently, it was used for film storage. In 2021 it reopened for worship after extensive restoration.

== Architecture ==
=== Exterior ===
This small mosque was built on a high terrace over a complex of vaulted shops, whose rents were intended to financially support the mosque complex. Its elevation makes it a more visible component of the Istanbul skyline. Narrow, twisting interior flights of steps in the corners give access to a spacious courtyard. The mosque has a double porch with five domed bays, from which projects a deep and low roof supported by a row of columns. Due to the lack of space on the elevated terrace, the ablution kiosk was located at street level.

=== Interior ===
External videos
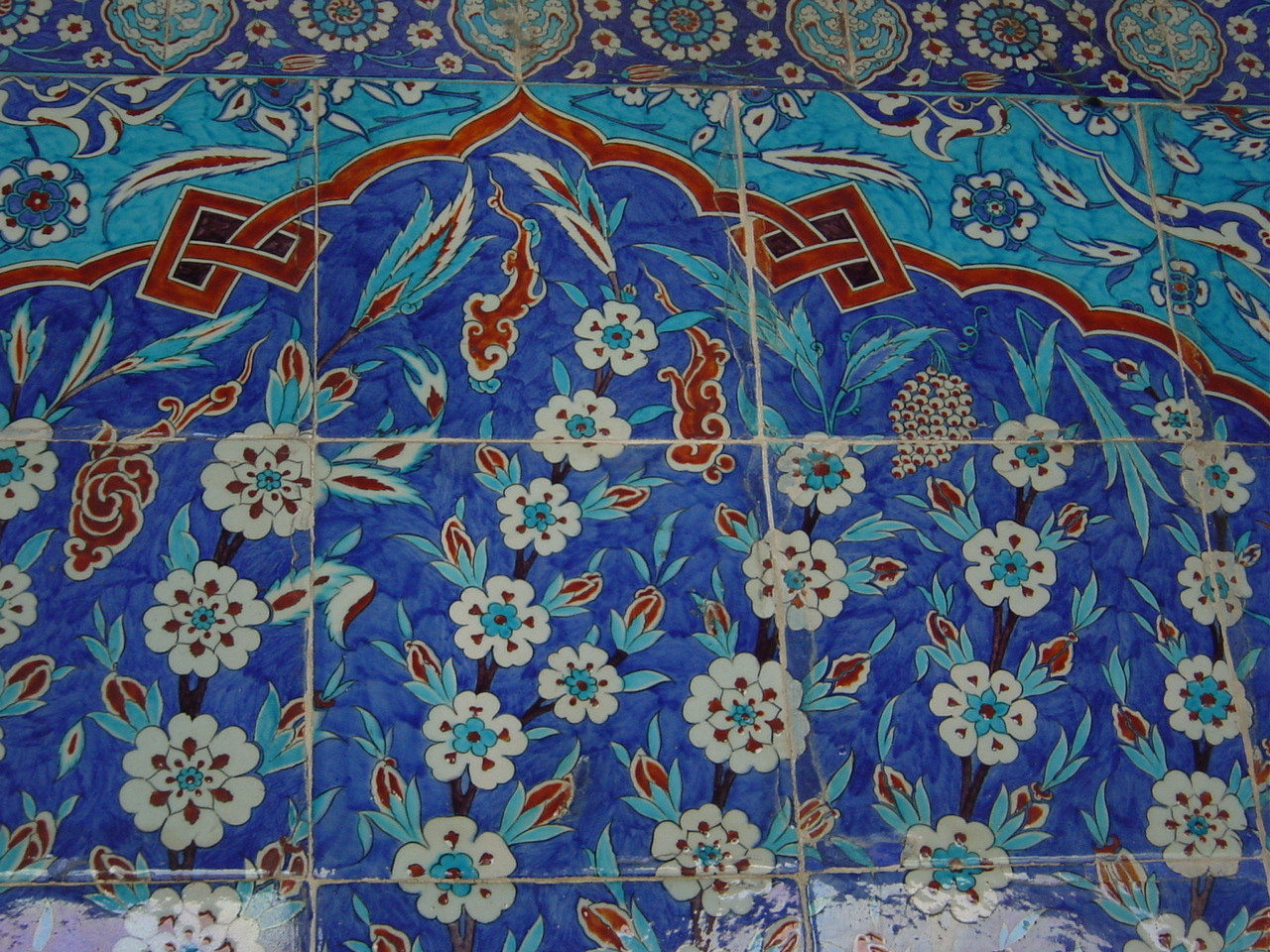
- Mimar Sinan, Rüstem Pasha Mosque, Istanbul, 1561-63, Smarthistory

The building is basically an octagon inscribed in a rectangle. The main dome rests on four semi-domes; not on the axes but in the diagonals of the building. The arches of the dome spring from four octagonal pillars— two on the north, two on the south— and from piers projecting from the east and west walls. To the north and south are galleries supported by pillars and by small marble columns between them.

=== İznik tiling ===
Sinan's architecture is known for emphasizing the structure of the buildings over the internal decoration. The Rüstem Pasha Mosque marked a substantial deviation from his typical style (and traditional Ottoman architecture) as it relied heavily on İznik tiling instead of favouring a more sparse interior. The Anatolian town of İznik was the heart of the Ottoman ceramics industry, which became a central component of the empire's artistic production after the conquest of Constantinople in 1453. While it has been theorized that the tiling may have been inspired by Sinan's wife Mihrimah, it could also be that Rüstem Pasha himself requested the tiling for economic reasons and to support a court artist specializing in floral designs.

The Rüstem Pasha Mosque is famous for its large quantities of İznik tiles in a very wide variety of floral and geometric designs, which cover not only the façade of the porch but also the mihrab, minbar and walls. There are approximately 2300 tiles arranged in around 80 different patterns. These tiles exhibit the early use of Armenian bole, a tomato-red pigment that would become characteristic of İznik pottery. While this red hue is applied more thinly on most of the tiles, it was applied heavily on the tiles near the qibla wall and appeared scarlet in colour. The bright emerald green colour is only used in a panel added above an exterior doorway at a later date, and a study of the qibla tiling indicates that turquoise was the greenest hue available to the mosque's builders prior to the addition of that emerald green. Some of the tiles, particularly those in a large panel under the portico to the left main entrance, are decorated with sage green and dark manganese purple that are characteristic of the earlier 'Damascus ware' colour scheme. Yet the mosque's tiling does not feature the olive green found to be characteristic of Damascus tiles. No other mosque makes such a lavish use of İznik tiles; with later mosques Sinan used tiles more sparingly.

According to Willis, some of the tiles in the Rüstem Pasha Mosque are of European origin (specifically Italian and Dutch) and also date to the eighteenth century.

=== The qibla wall and mihrab ===
The Rüstem Pasha Mosque's qibla wall includes a number of new and experimental painting styles in addition to the traditional ceramic tiles. This is consistent with the mosque's unique emphasis on İznik tiles and parallels other buildings designed by Sinan, such as the Süleymaniye Complex. Walter B. Denny hypothesizes that this could have been “deemed a project too large for one designer,” and that several other aspiring architects added to Sinan's contributions.

The qibla wall features mostly blue tiles in a variety of shades, including turquoise and cobalt. Some Armenian bole is used as an “accent,” adding to the general theme of blueness in this section of the mosque. These tiles are almost all “repeating modules” and do not appear to be specially designed for the Rüstem Pasha Mosque. Emblematic is the Rüstem Pasha Border, which consists of cobalt tiles, a white rosace, and turquoise embellishments, and recurs throughout the mosque. The tiles in this section feature rose buds, lotus palmettes, and leaves, consistent with the floral decoration characteristic of this mosque. Despite these details, the qibla tiling is relatively simple: most of the details utilize only two shades of paint, both blue (known as “two-blue” painting), which results in a somewhat monotonous presentation.

Inset in the wall is a mihrab shaped like a half-dodecagon. Between the two mihrab frames rests a panel featuring calligraphy; above them, there are three windows. The repeating tile patterns are shaped to conform to the structure of the mosque, so many are cut in unusual and arbitrary ways. For example, the bottom of the mihrab tiles are cut arbitrarily when they reach the floor. The lack of a foundation leads to an abrupt shift from the tiling to the floor.

Wedged between the mihrab frame and niche is cambered tiling featuring a bright shade of red which stands out because that shade of red is not found elsewhere and contrasts with the dark red used as an accent on many other qibla tiles. This cambered section also is much more ornate than the relatively plain two-blue tiling on either side. The mihrab frame tiles are quite different as they feature embellished white tiles and include blue guard stripe borders. While these borders feature the two-blue painting style, they are less dry than the two-blue tiling found elsewhere on the qibla wall. The border stripes frame both the mihrab and the calligraphy (in the thuluth script) panel above the frame tiles. The result is a unique structure in Istanbul and among Sinan's other works.

== Gallery ==
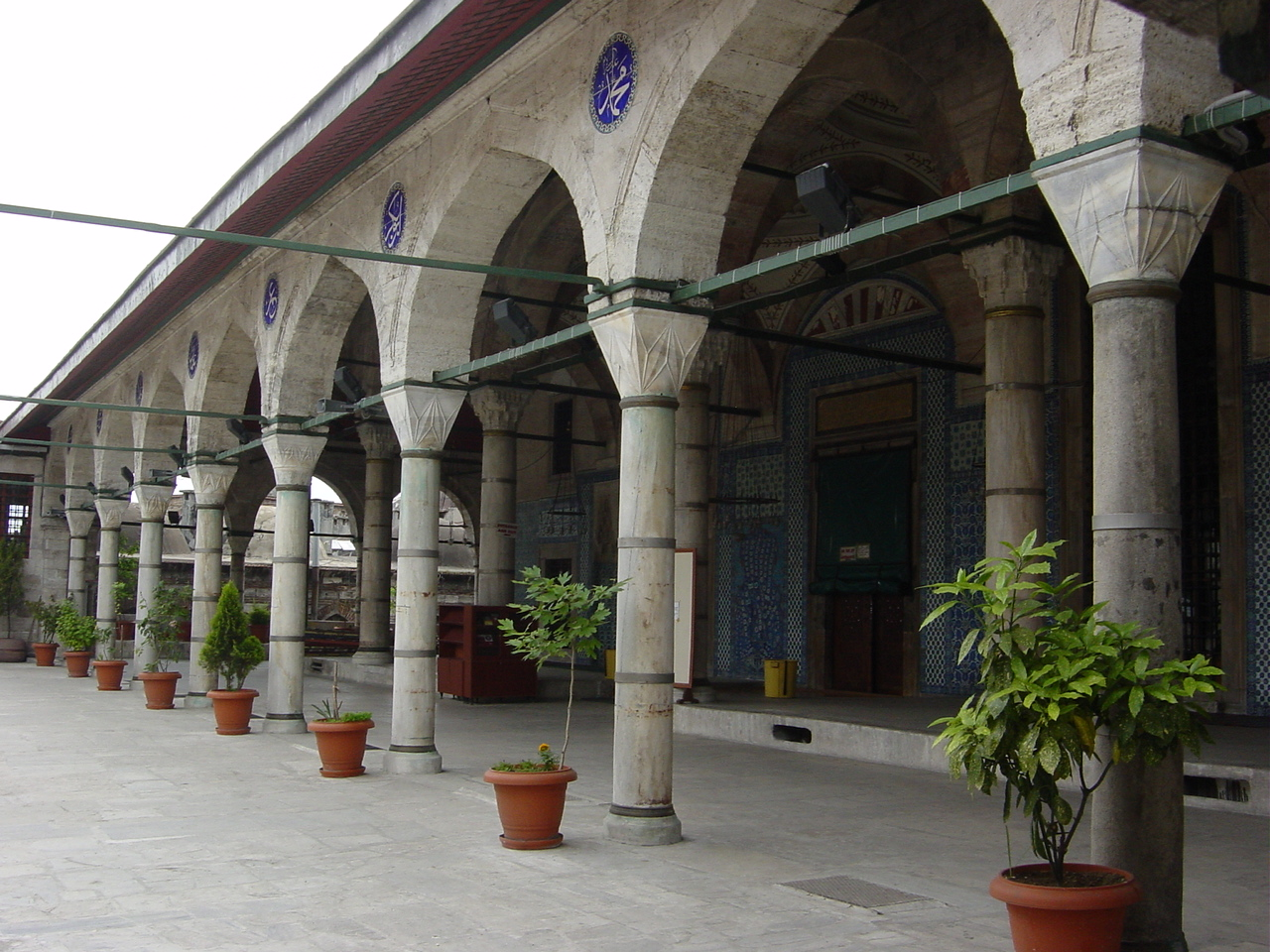
Portico

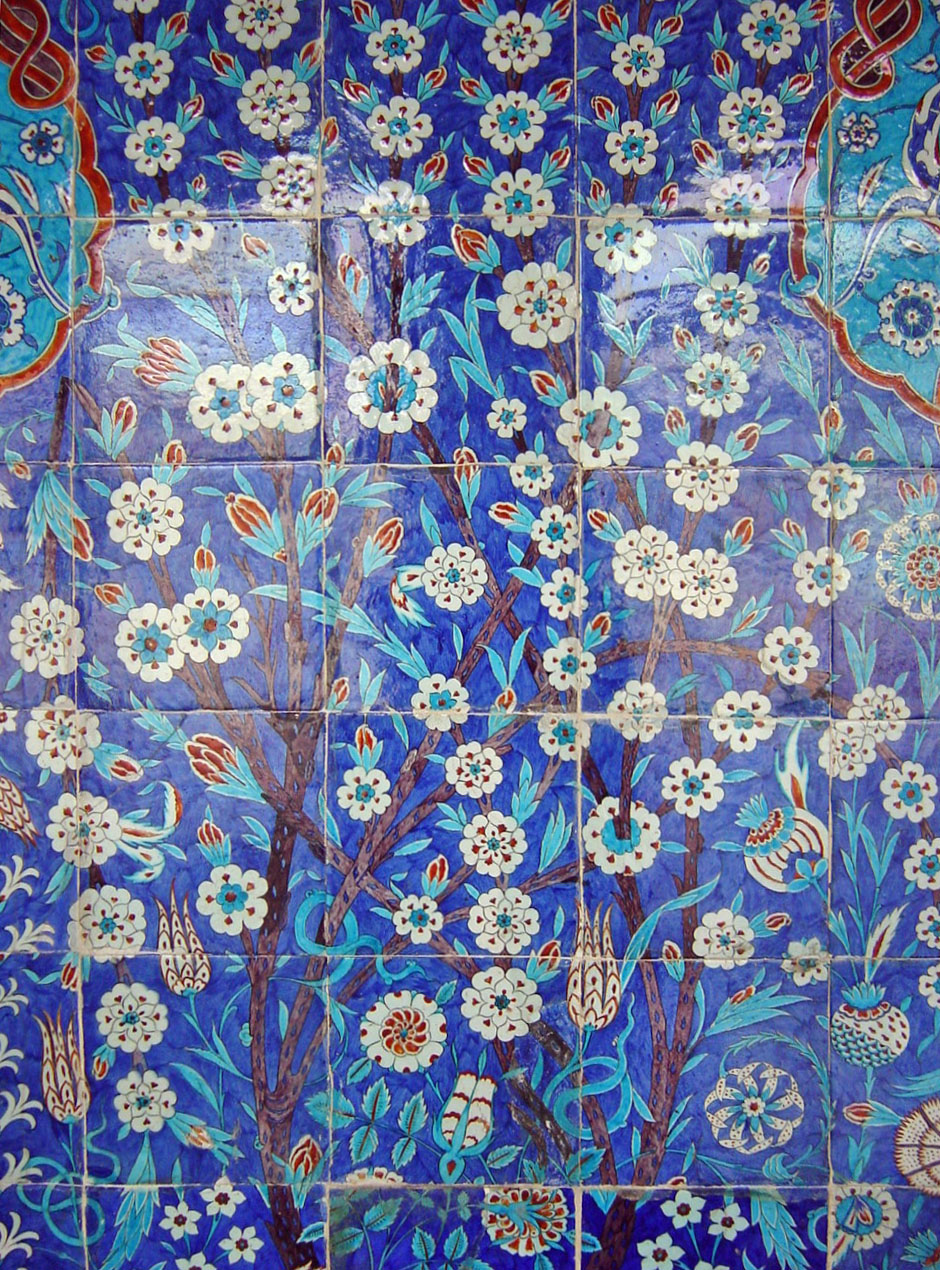
Iznik tiles at entrance

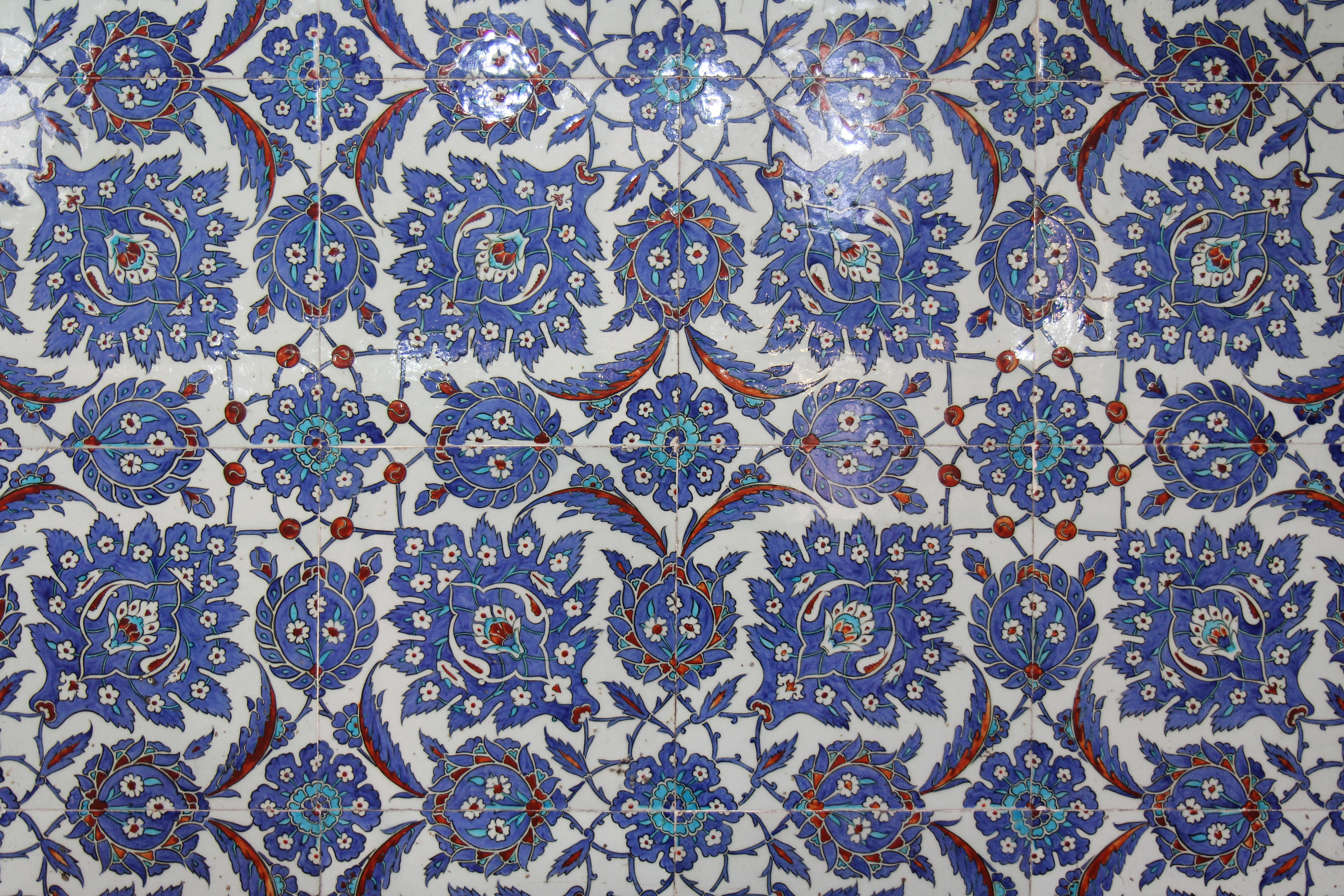
Iznik tiles

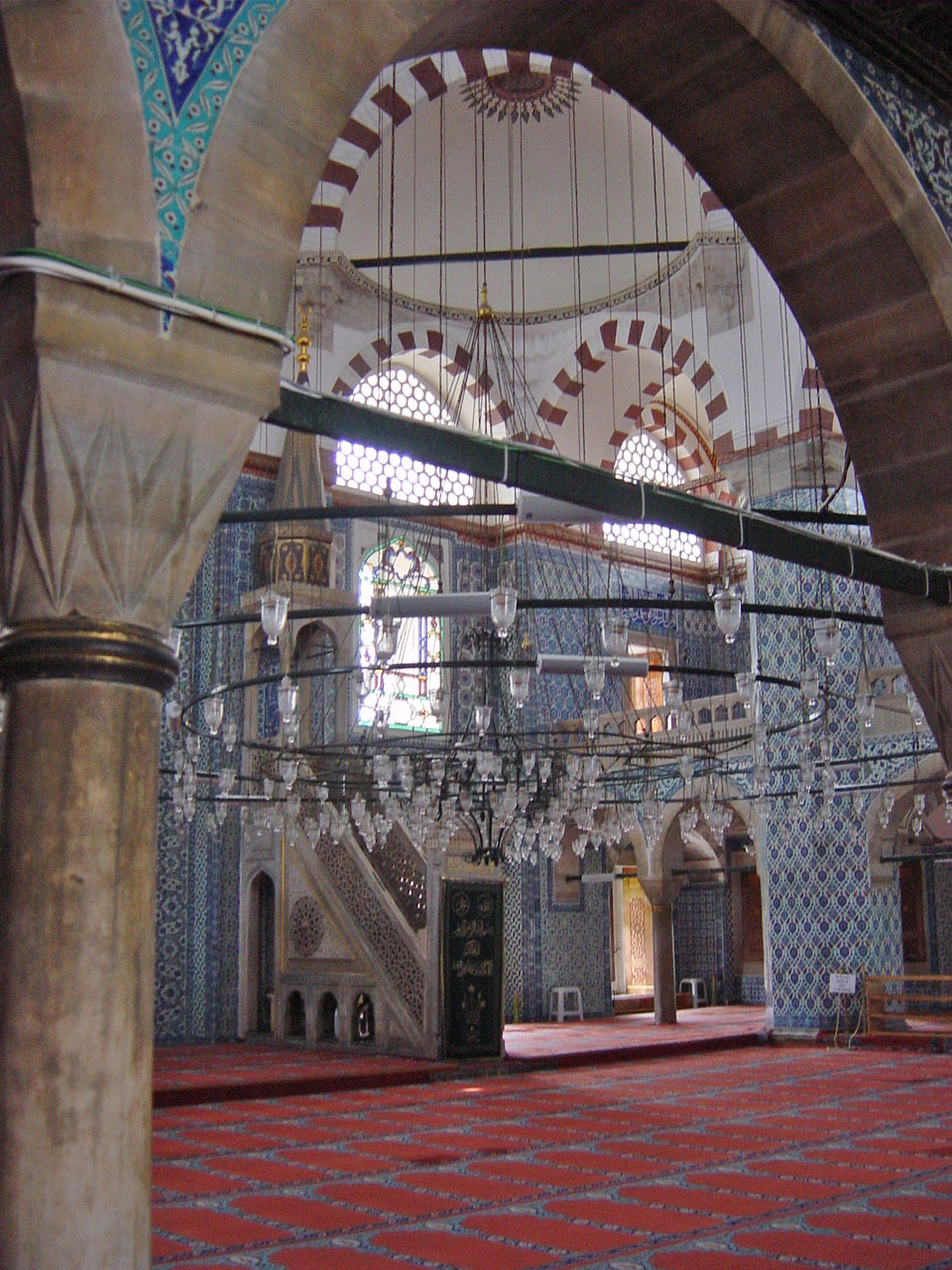
Interior view

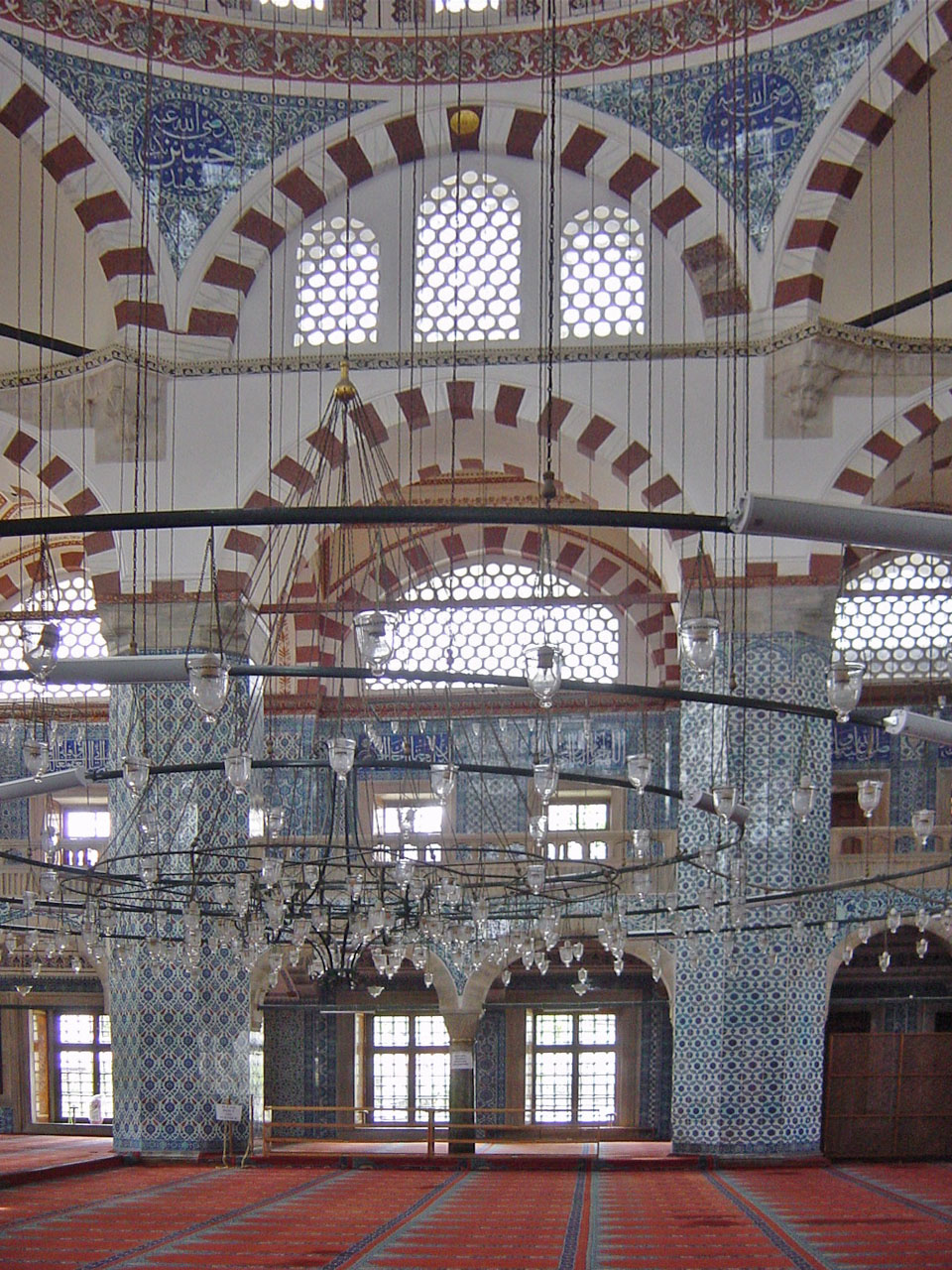
Interior view

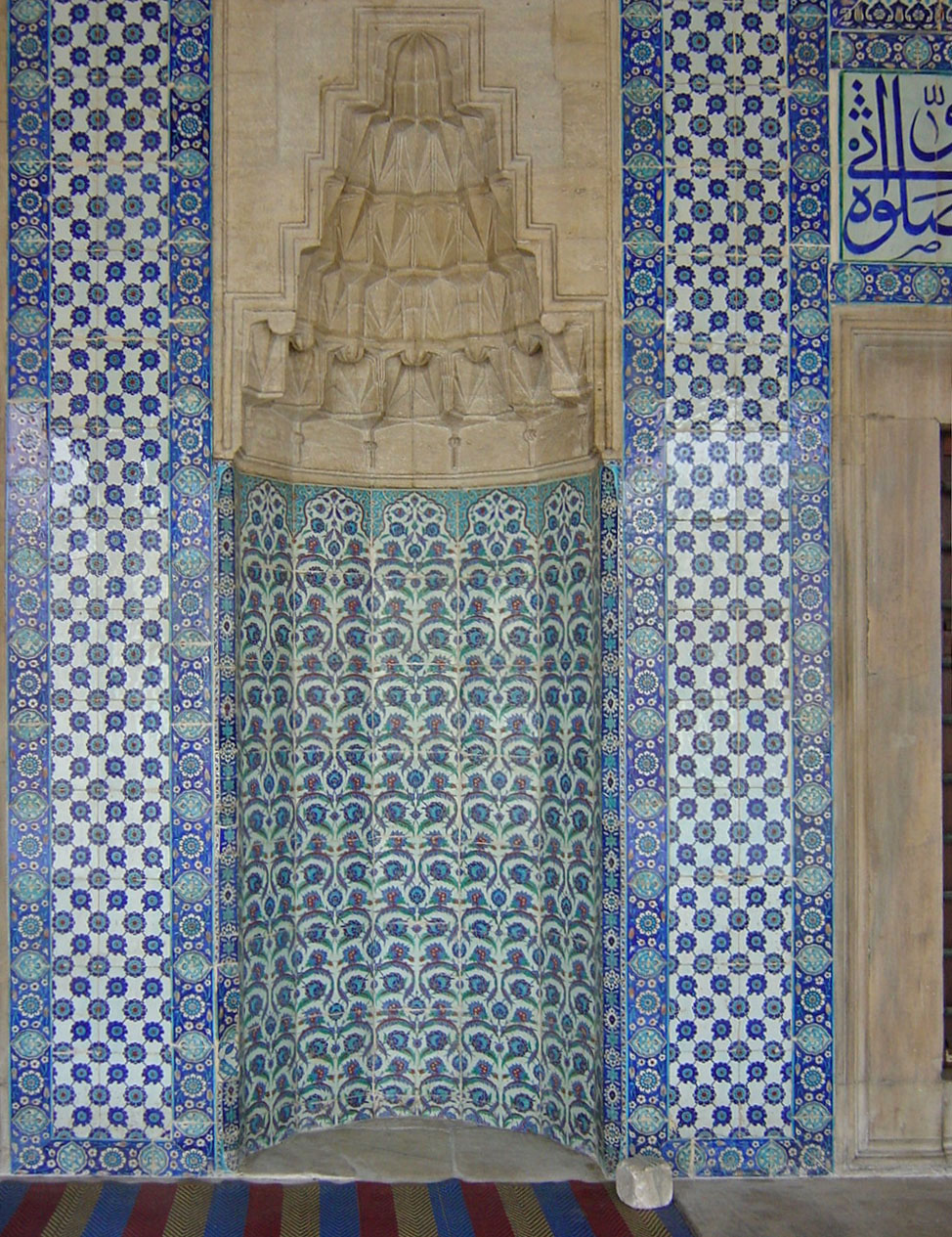
Mihrab

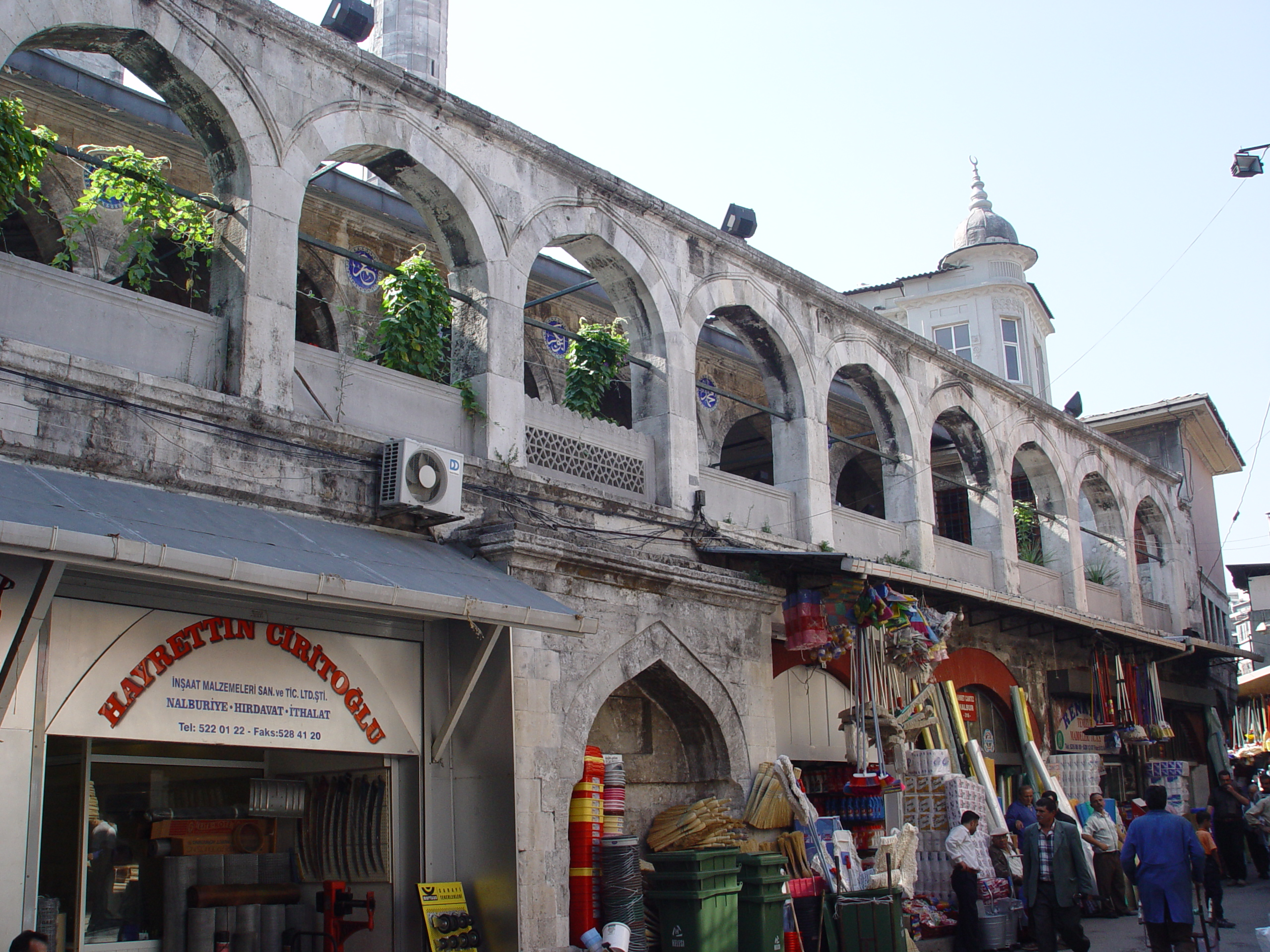
Rüstem Pasha mosque view from street in the west

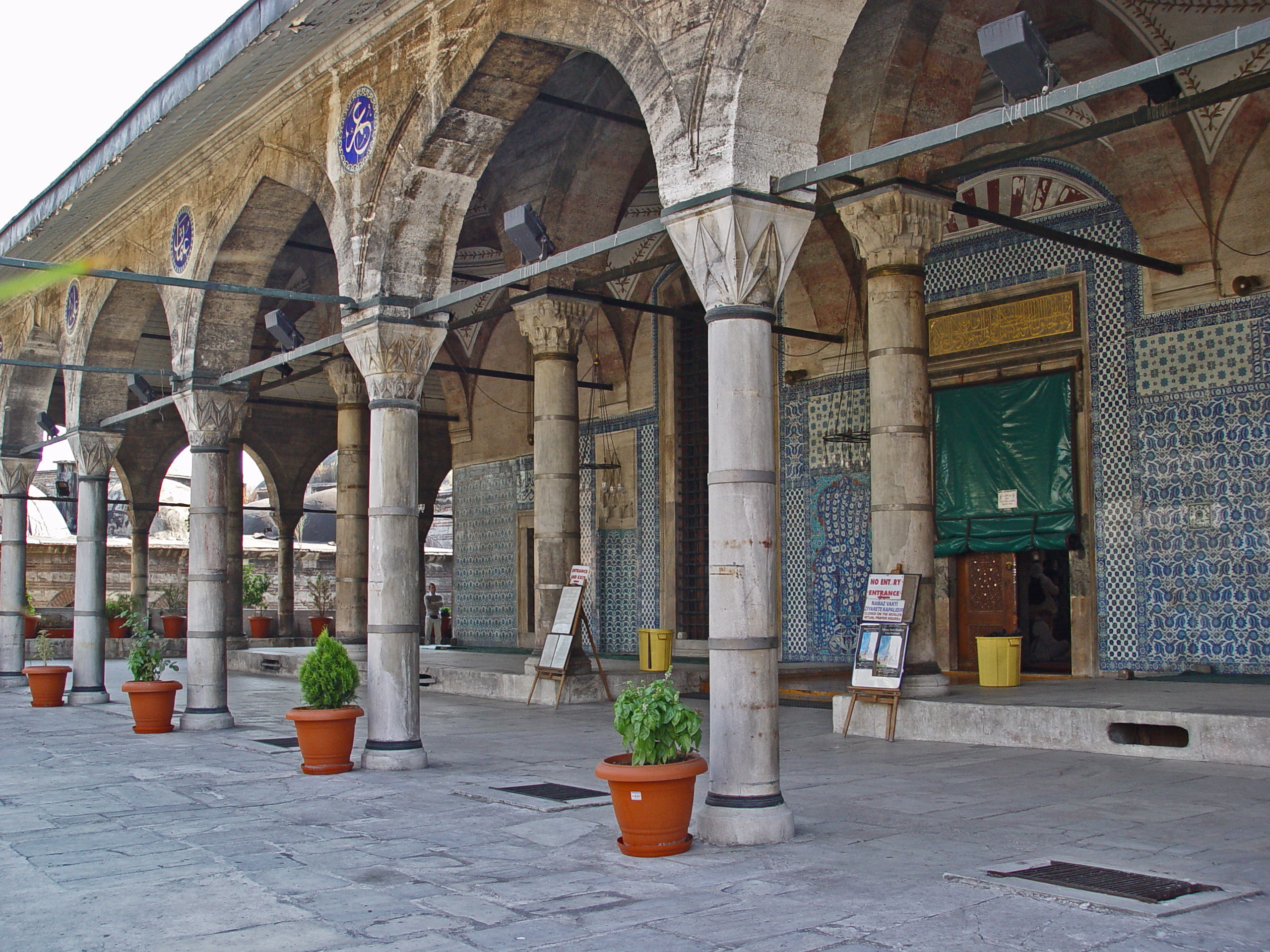
Double porticoed north façade with the main entrance

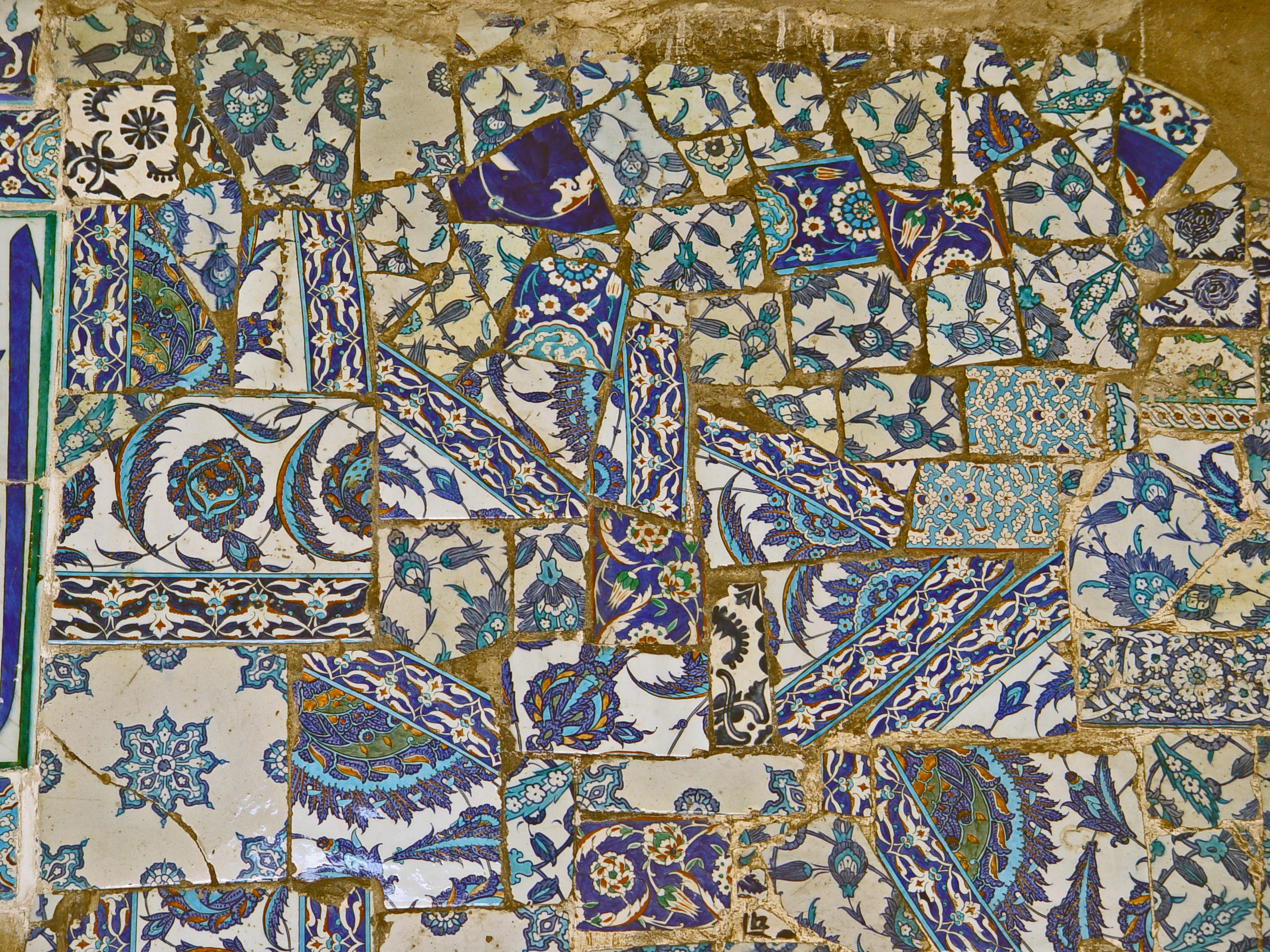
Rüstem Pasha mosque Iznik tiles hotchpotch

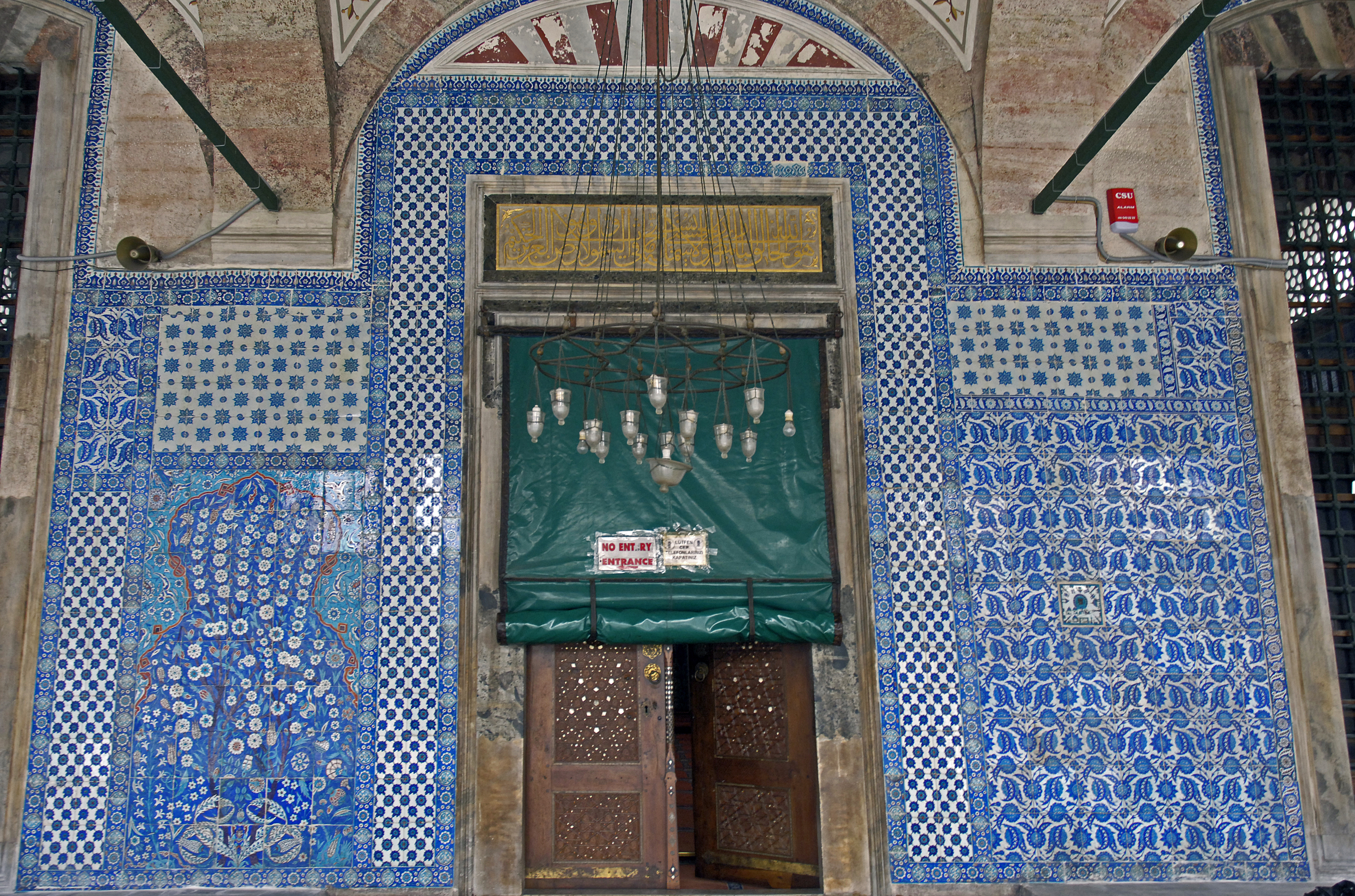
Rüstem Pasha mosque Iznik tiles

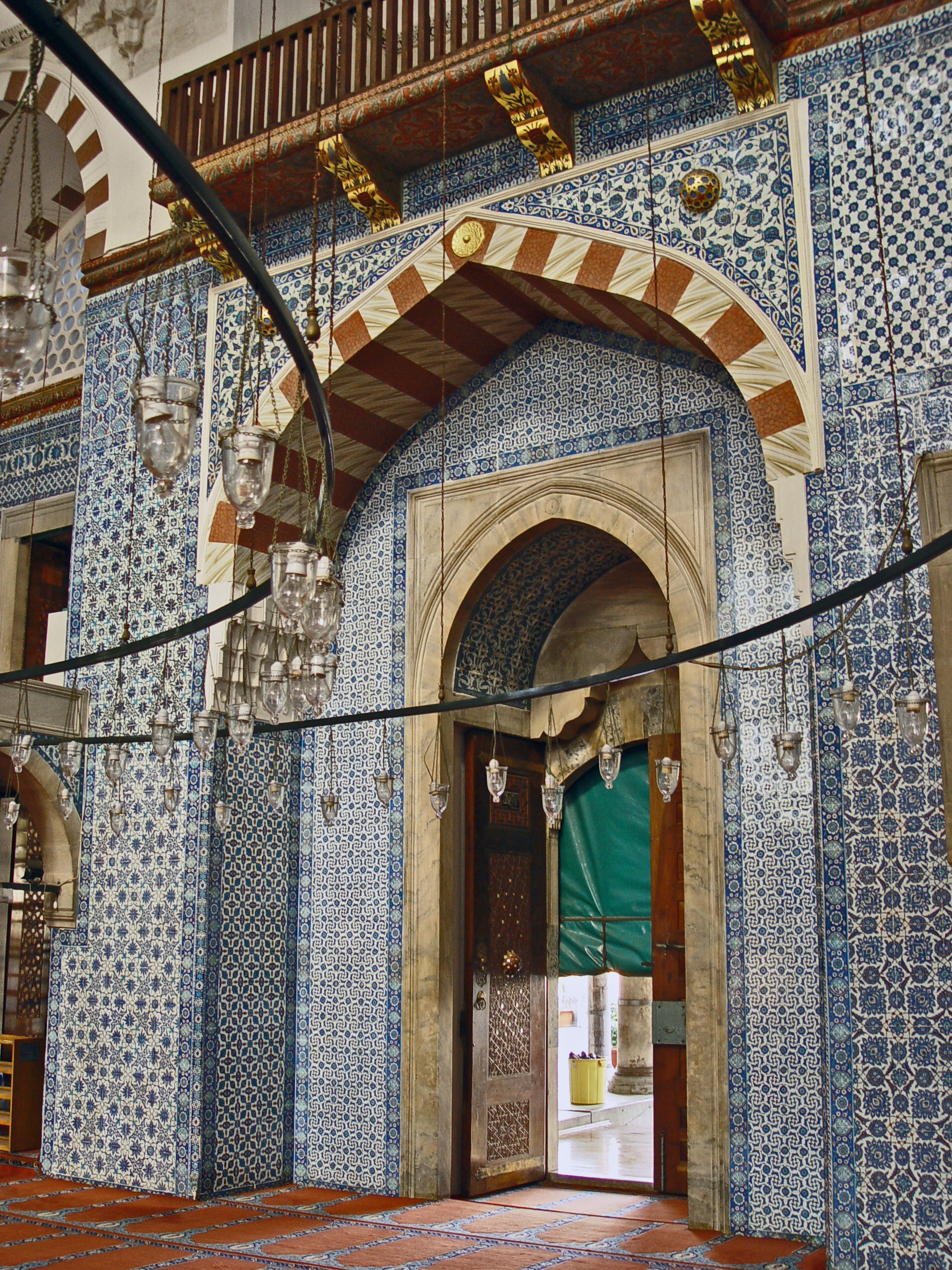
Rüstem Pasha mosque Iznik tiles around entrance

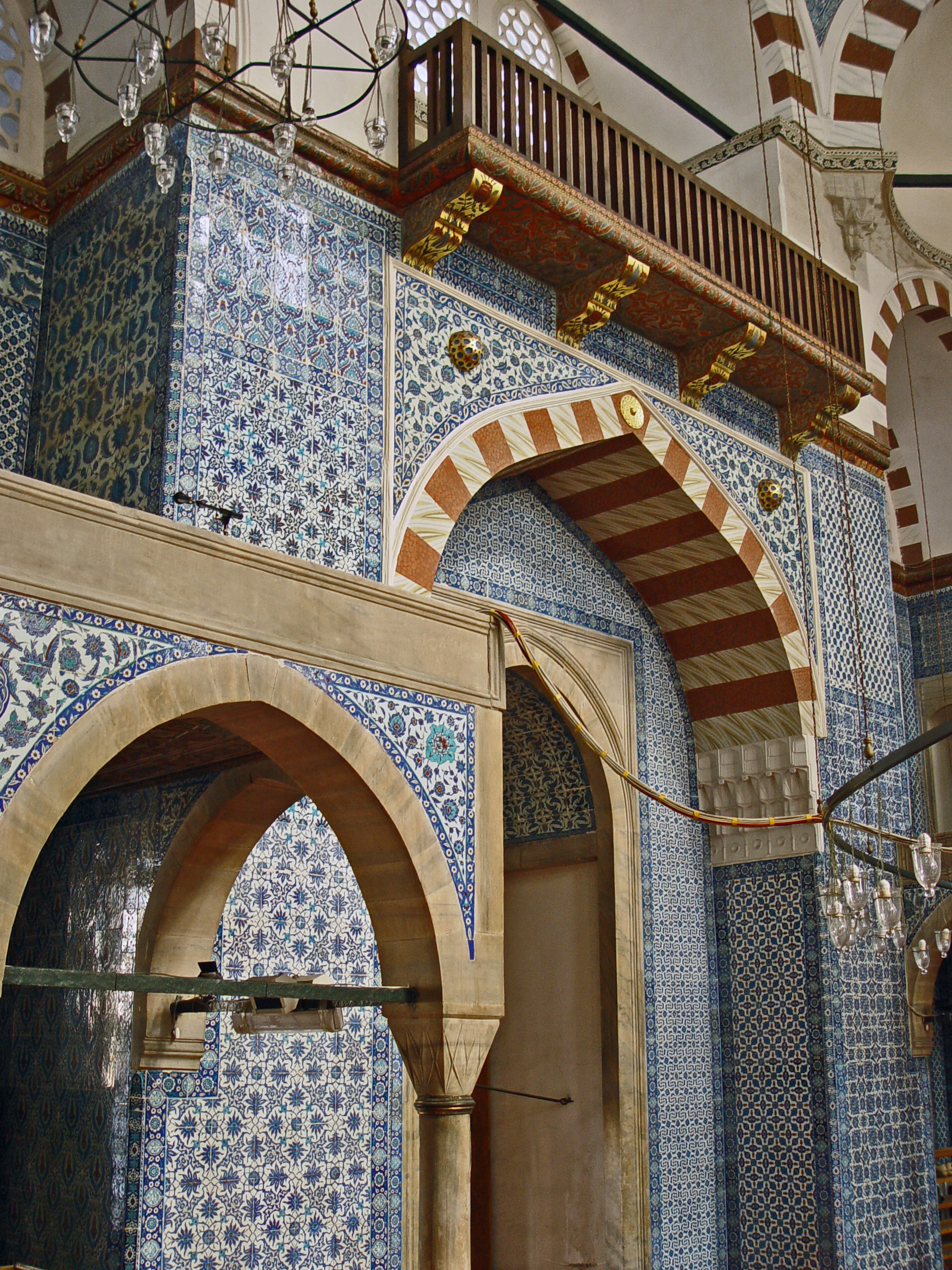
Rüstem Pasha mosque Iznik tiles around entrance

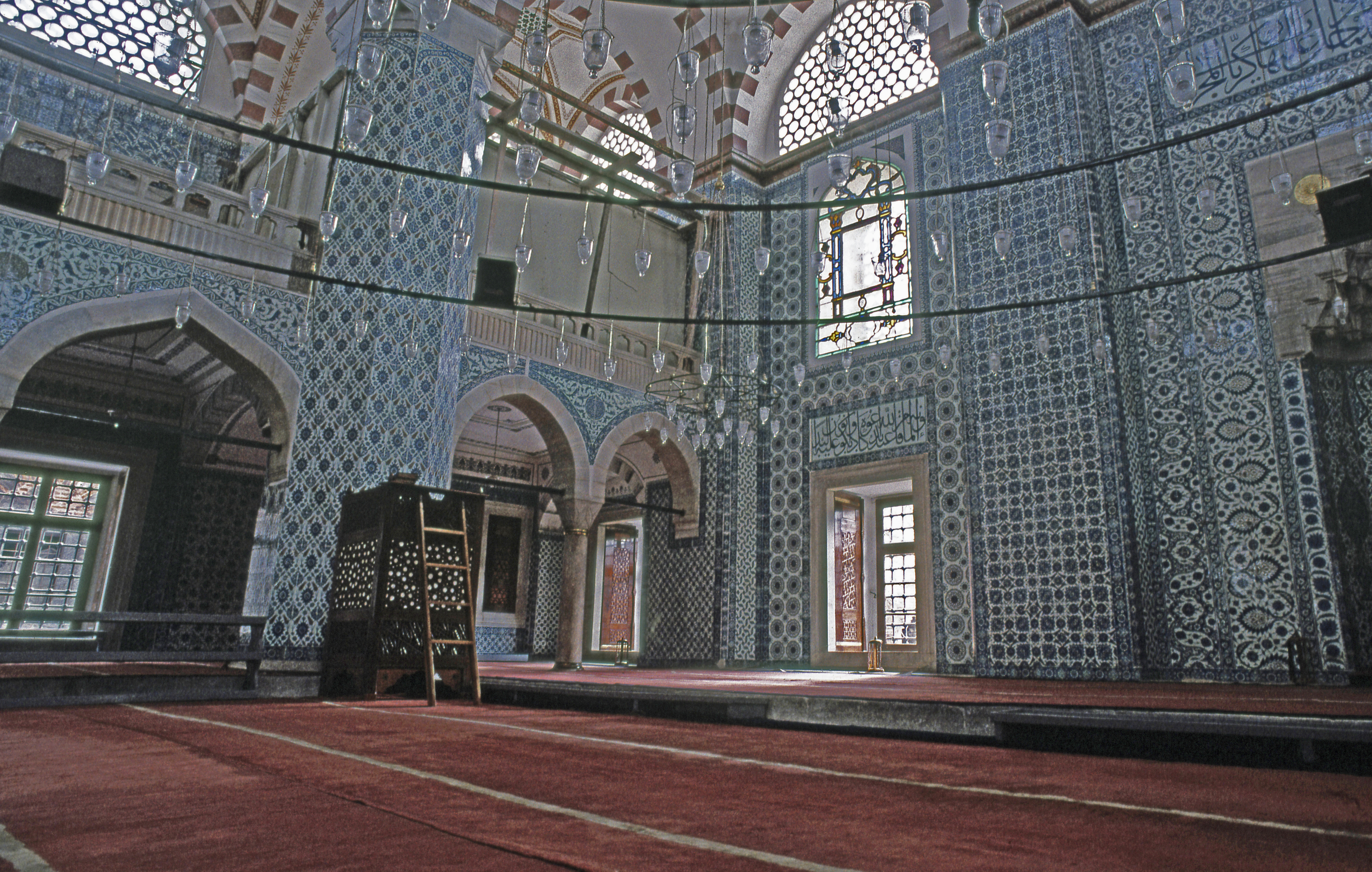
Rüstem Pasha mosque interior view

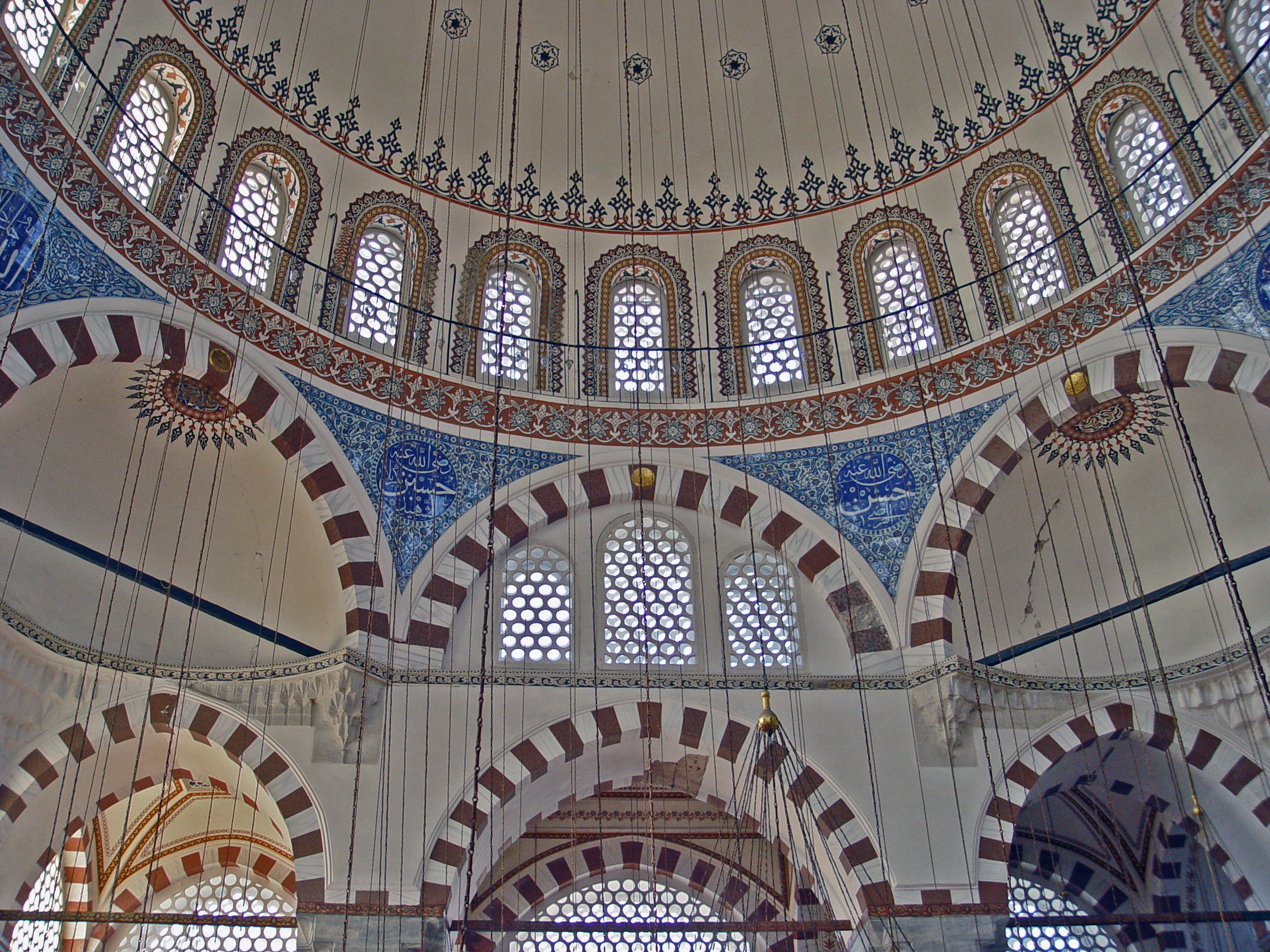
Rüstem Pasha mosque in dome

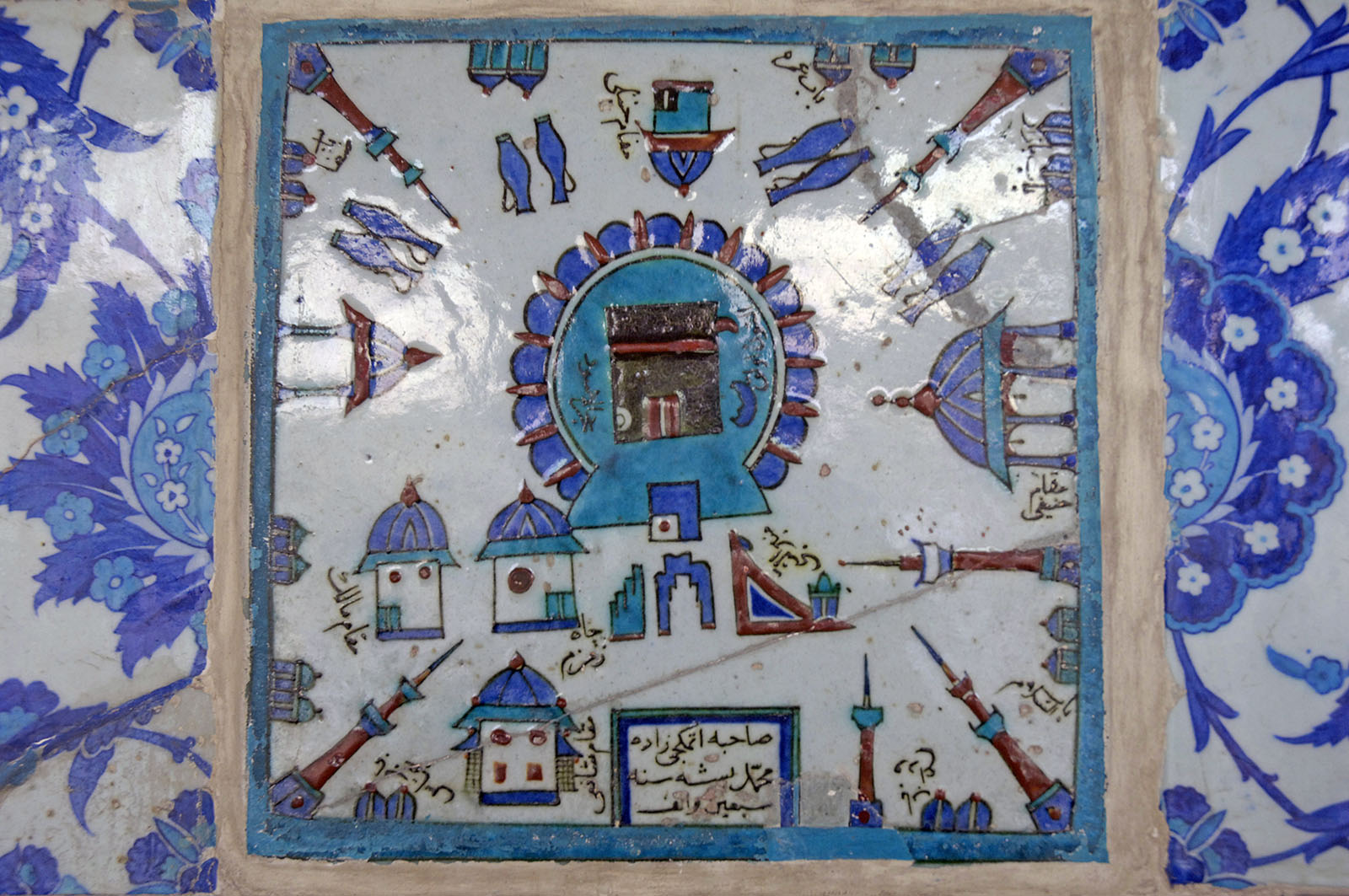
Rüstem Pasha mosque Iznik tiles with Kaaba

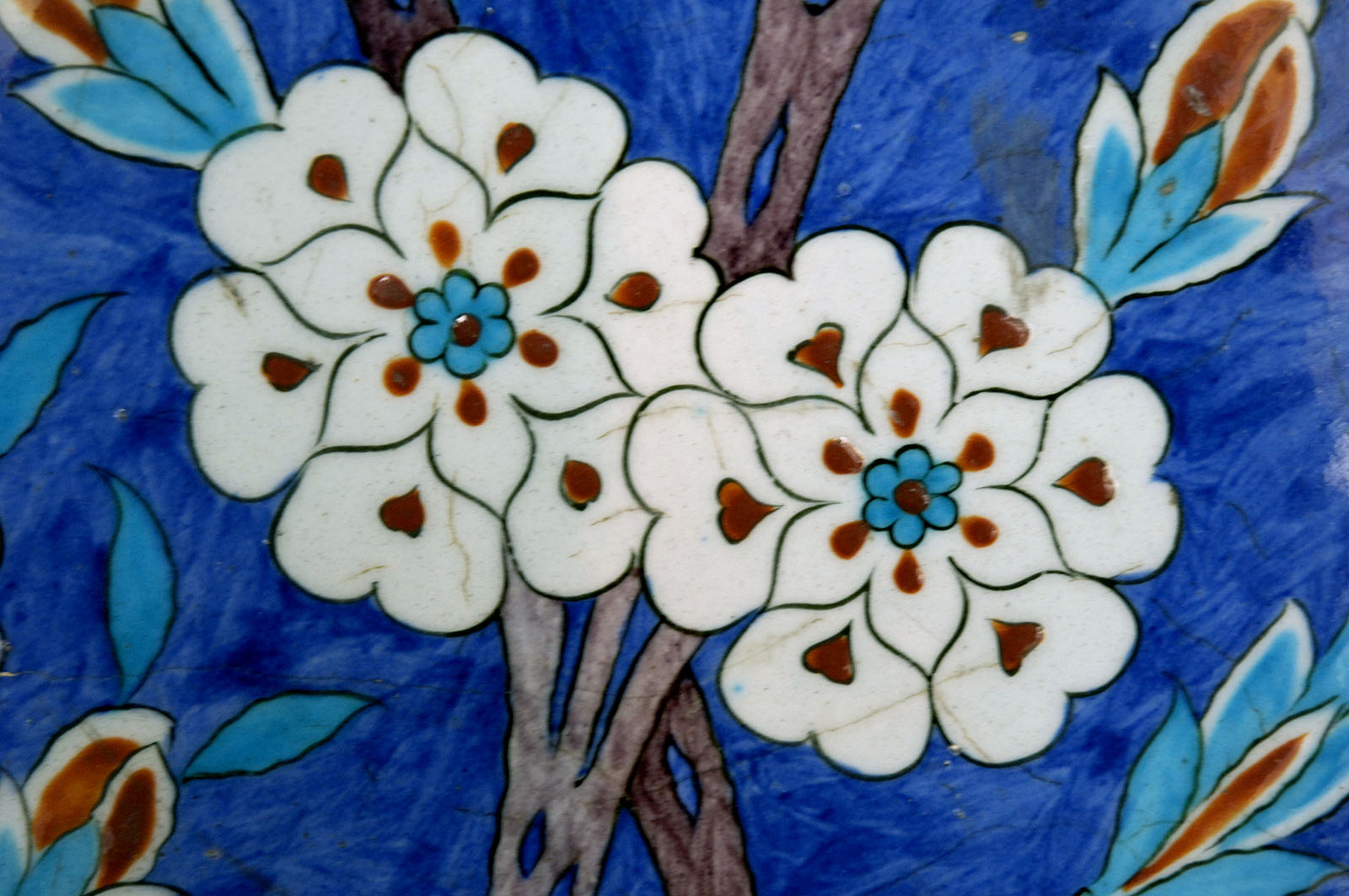
Rüstem Pasha mosque Iznik tiles

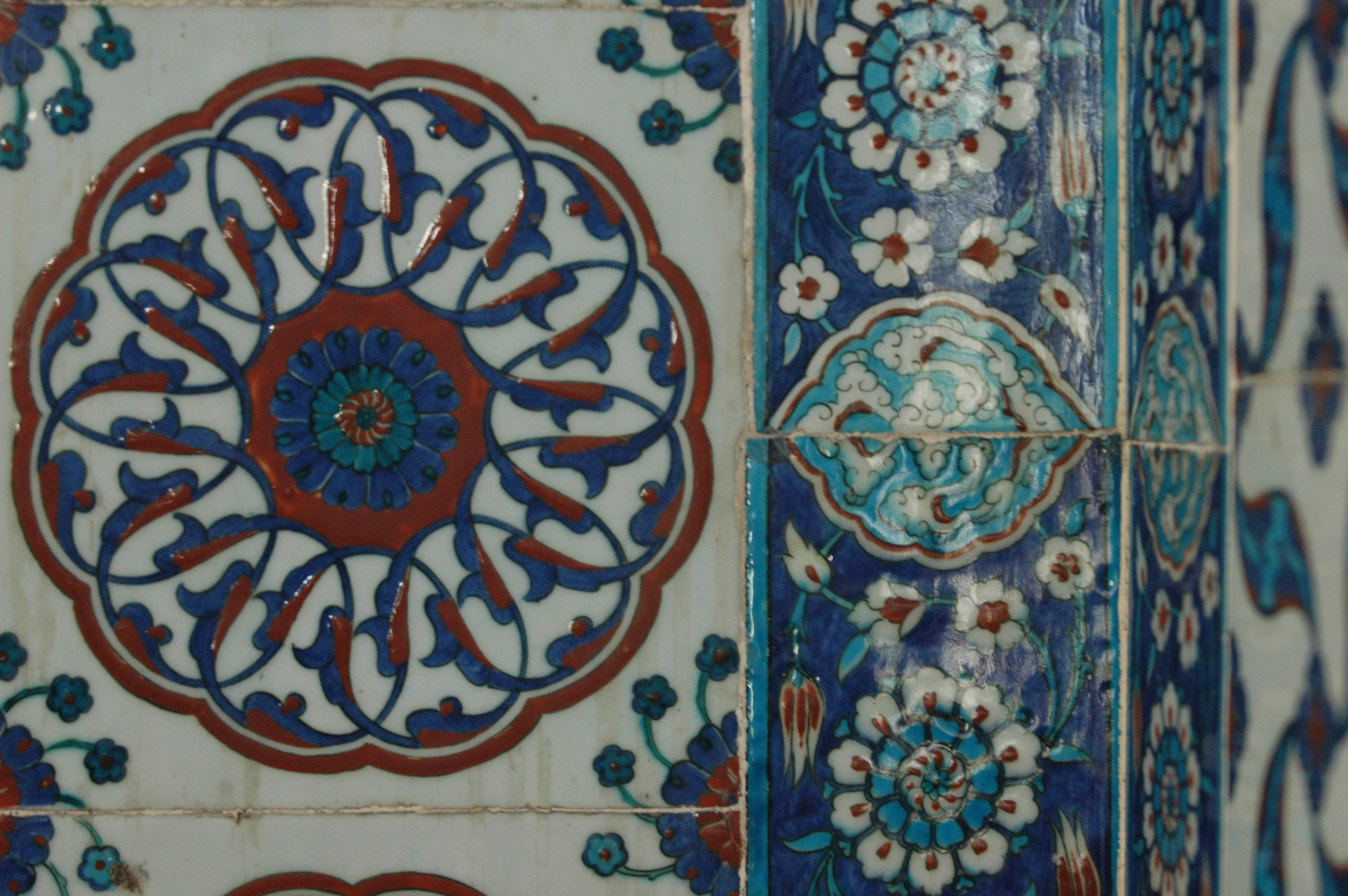
Rüstem Pasha mosque Iznik tiles

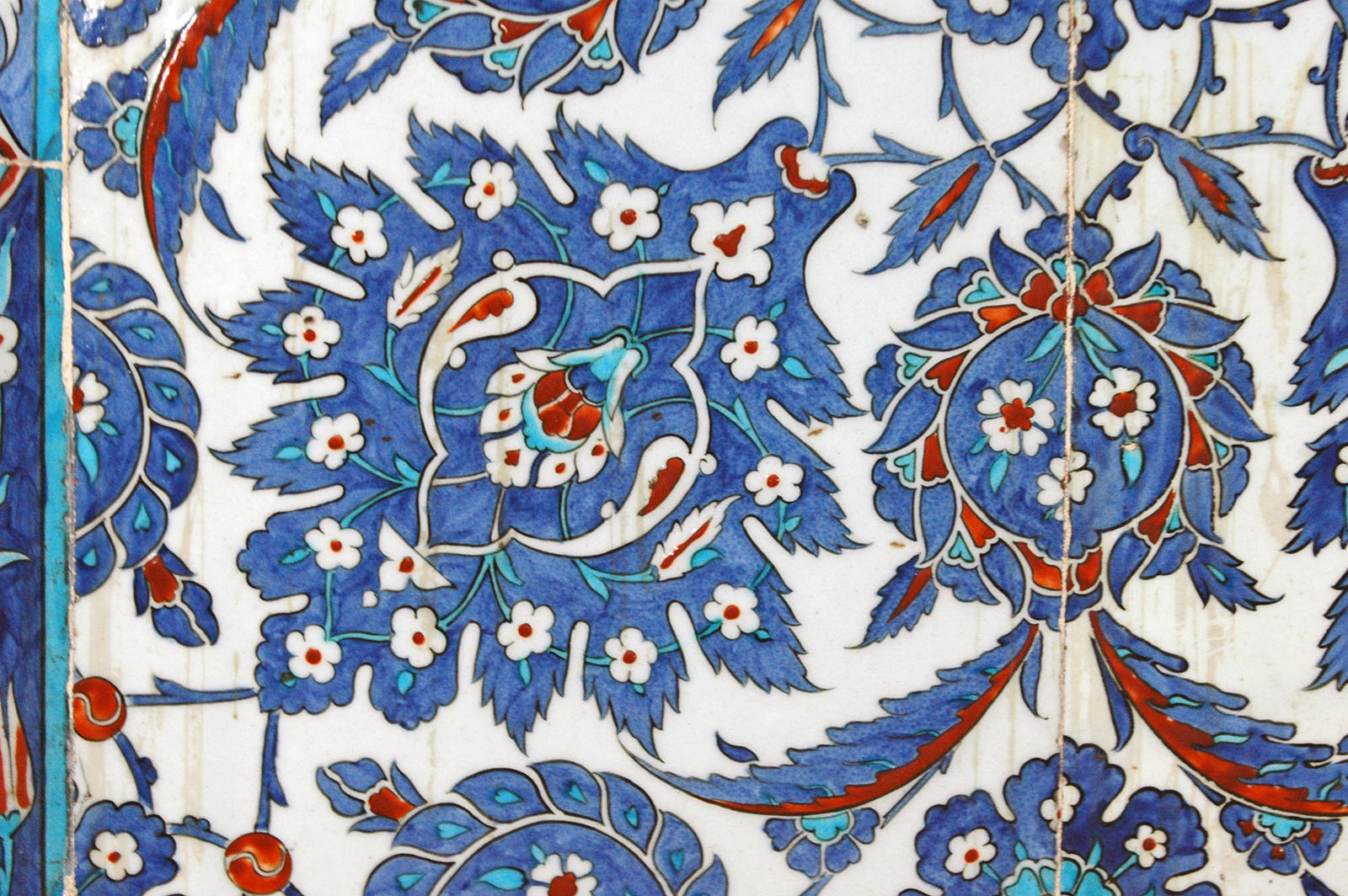
Rüstem Pasha mosque Iznik tiles

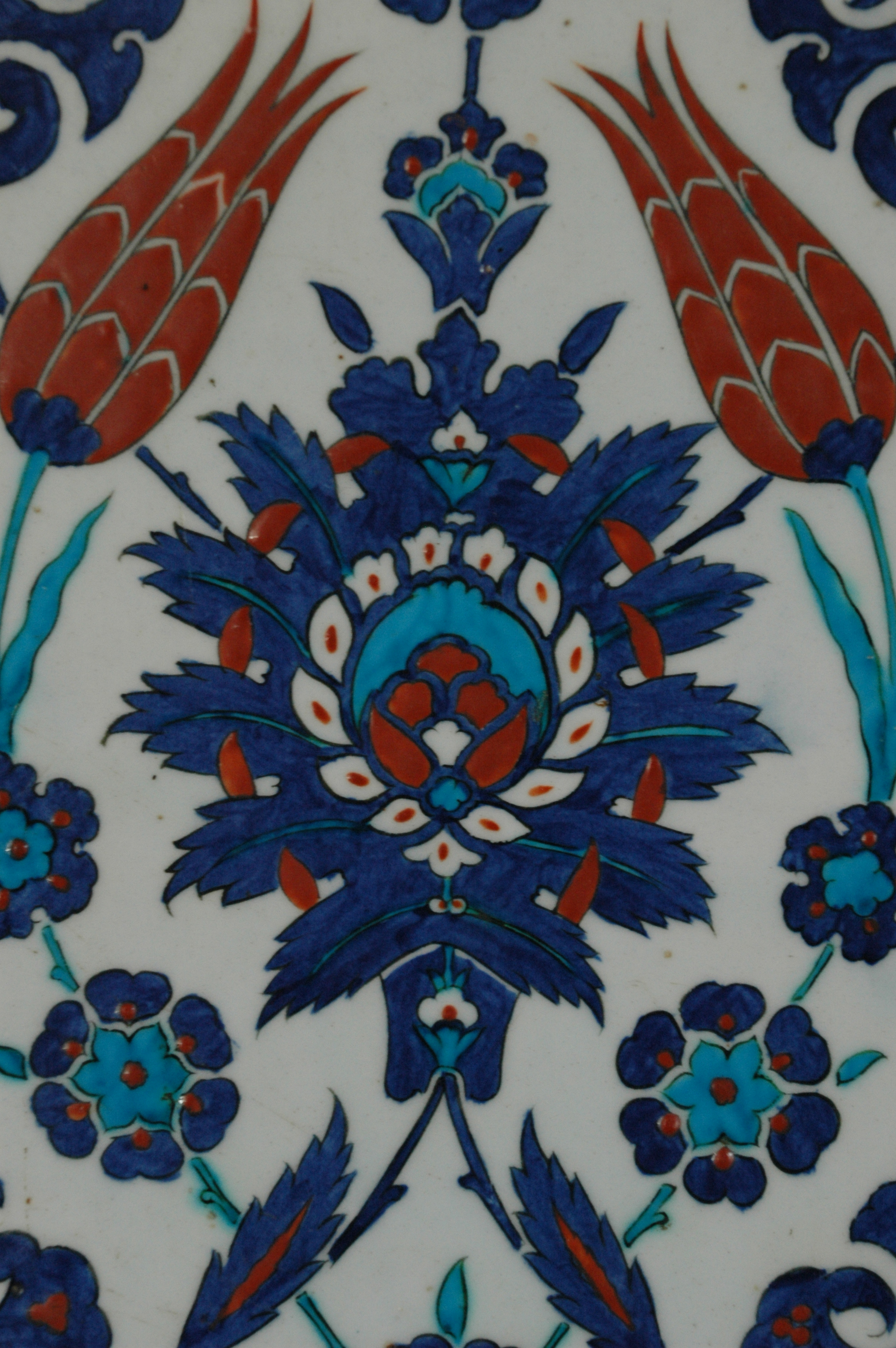
Rüstem Pasha mosque Iznik tiles

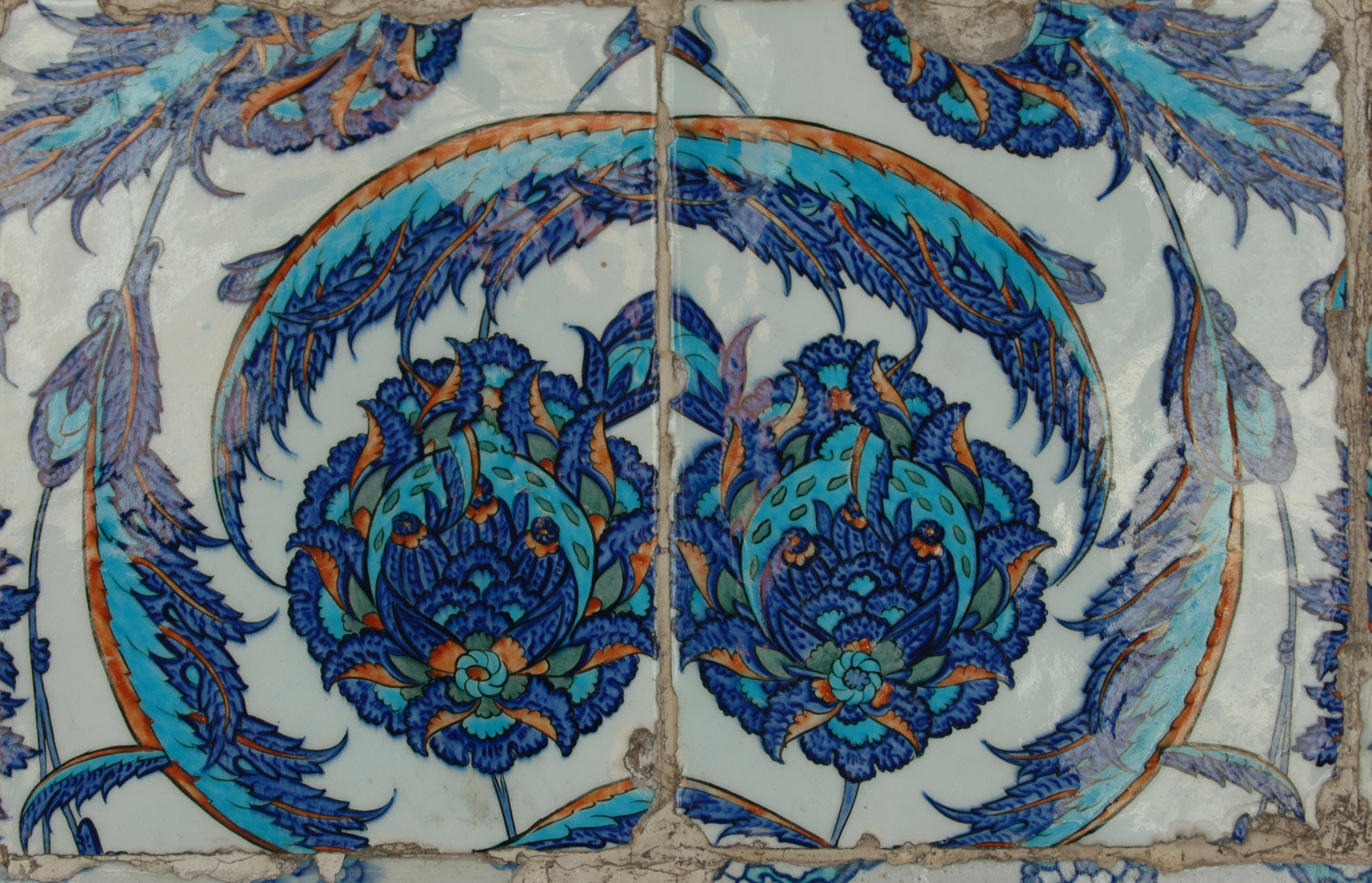
Rüstem Pasha mosque Iznik tiles

== See also ==
- List of Friday mosques designed by Mimar Sinan

== Sources ==
- Atasoy, Nurhan; Raby, Julian (1989). Petsopoulos, Yanni (ed.). Iznik: The Pottery of Ottoman Turkey. London: Alexandria Press. ISBN 978-1-85669-054-6.
- Carswell, John (2006) [1998]. Iznik Pottery. London: British Museum Press. ISBN 978-0-7141-2441-4..
- Denny, Walter B. (2004). Iznik: The Artistry of Ottoman Ceramics. London: Thames & Hudson. ISBN 978-0-500-51192-3.
- Freely, John (2000). Blue Guide Istanbul. W.W. Norton & Company. ISBN 0-393-32014-6.
- Necipoğlu, Gülru (2005). The Age of Sinan: Architectural Culture in the Ottoman Empire. London: Reaktion Books. ISBN 978-1-86189-253-9.
- Rogers, J.M. (2007). Sinan: Makers of Islamic Civilization. I.B. Tauris. ISBN 978-1-84511-096-3.
