= Semiz Ali Pasha =

Grand Vizier of the Ottoman Empire from 1561 to 1565

34th Grand Vizier of the Ottoman Empire
- In office 10 July 1561 – 28 June 1565
- Monarch: Suleiman I
- Preceded by: Rüstem Pasha
- Succeeded by: Sokollu Mehmed Pasha

Personal details
- Born: Prača, Ottoman Empire
- Died: 28 June 1565 Constantinople, Ottoman Empire

Semiz Ali Pasha (Ottoman Turkish: سيمز علي پاشا, Serbo-Croatian: Semiz Ali-Paša) was an Ottoman Bosnian statesman from the Sanjak of Bosnia who served as Grand Vizier of the Ottoman Empire from 1561 to 1565. He was the beylerbey (governor) of Egypt Eyalet from 1549 to 1553. Semiz Ali Pasha was born in Prača in Bosnia (thus his secondary epithet), and replaced Rüstem Pasha as Grand Vizier. After palace schooling, he discharged high-level functions along the Ottoman Empire. His epithet "Semiz" means "fat" in Turkish.

In 1561 he negotiated with the ambassador of the Holy Roman Empire, Ogier de Busbecq, on the terms of a peace treaty which was ratified in Vienna the following year.

== In popular culture ==
In the TV series Muhteşem Yüzyıl, Semiz Ali Pasha was played by the Turkish actor Fatih Dokgöz.

== See also ==
- List of Ottoman grand viziers
- List of Ottoman governors of Egypt

Political offices
Preceded by Lala Kara Mustafa Pasha as acting Governor	Ottoman Governor of Egypt; 1549–1554	Succeeded by Dukakinzade Mehmed Pasha
Preceded by Rüstem Pasha	Grand Vizier of the Ottoman Empire; 10 July 1561 – 28 June 1565	Succeeded by Sokollu Mehmed Pasha
