= Rüstem Pasha Medrese, Kütahya =

Madrasa in Kütahya, Turkey

Rüstem Pasha Medrese
- Turkish: Rüstem Paşae Medresesi
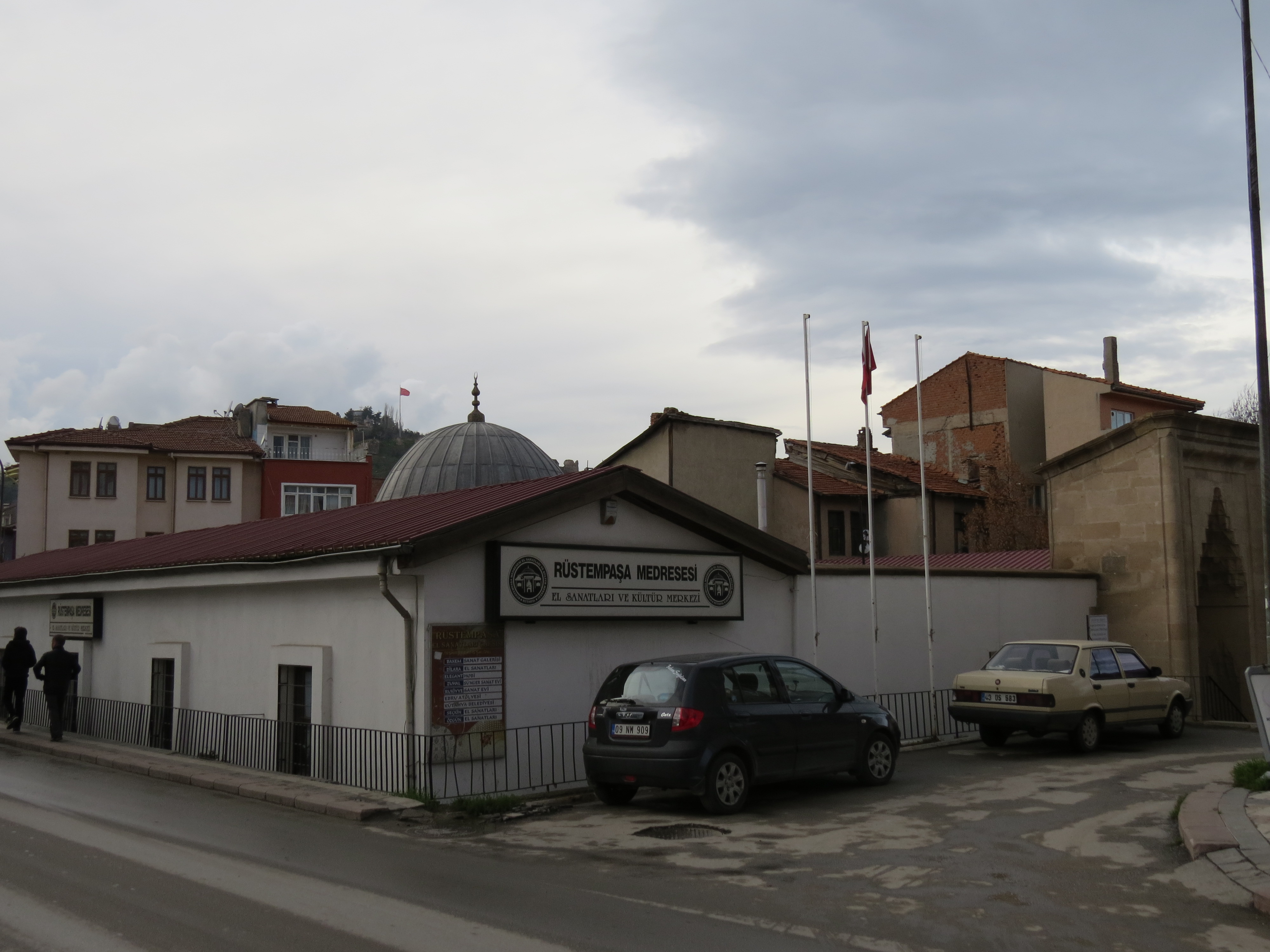

Location
- Kütahya; Turkey
- Coordinates: 39°25′09.3″N 29°58′48.7″E

Information
- Type: madrasa
- Religious affiliation: Islam

Rüstem Pasha Medrese (Turkish: Rüstem Paşae Medresesi) is a medrese building, located in Kütahya, Turkey. It was rebuilt after the original building, which was built by Ottoman statesman and grand vizier Rüstem Pasha in 1550. It was partly demolished in the 1930s.
