= Rüstem Pasha Caravanserai (Ereğli) =

- Rüstem Paşa Kervansarayı
- Location within Turkey

General information
- Type: Caravanserai
- Architectural style: Ottoman architecture
- Location: Ereğli, Konya, Turkey
- Coordinates: 37°30′51.7″N 34°03′00.5″E
- Completed: 1552; 474 years ago

Design and construction
- Architect: Mimar Sinan
- Main contractor: Rüstem Pasha

Rüstem Pasha Caravanserai (Turkish: Rüstem Paşa Kervansarayı) is a caravanserai located in Ereğli, Konya, Turkey, commissioned by Ottoman statesman and grand vizier Rüstem Pasha and built by court architect Mimar Sinan in 1552.
