= Rüstem Pasha Caravanserai (Edirne) =

- Rüstem Paşa Kervansarayı
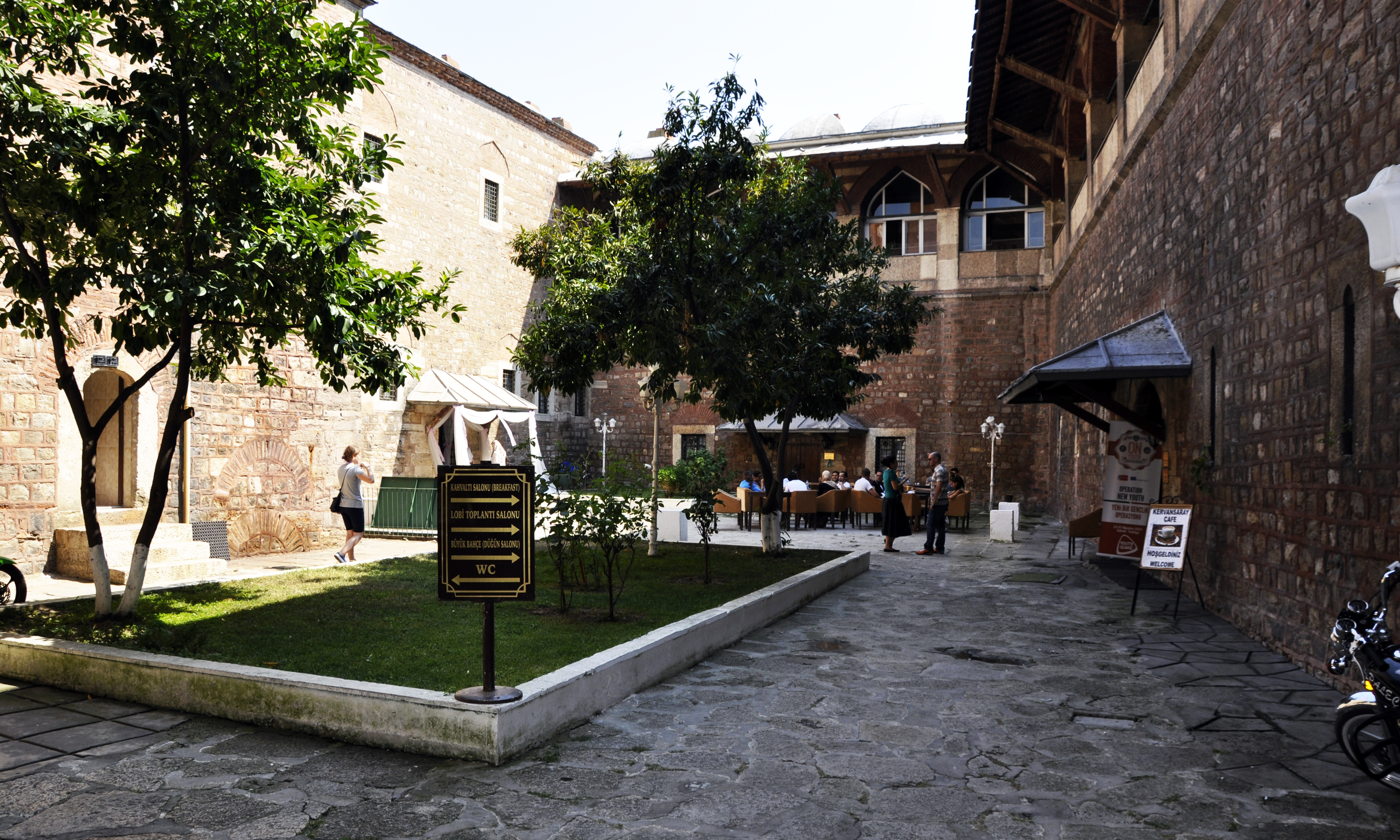
- A view of the courtyard of the caravanserai, which is used as a hotel today

- Location within Marmara

General information
- Type: Caravanserai
- Architectural style: Ottoman architecture
- Location: Edirne, Turkey
- Coordinates: 41°40′32″N 26°33′20″E
- Completed: 1561; 465 years ago
- Renovated: 1972
- Client: Rüstem Pasha

Design and construction
- Architect: Mimar Sinan

Renovating team
- Architect: Ertan Cakirlar
- Awards and prizes: Aga Khan Award for Architecture

Rüstem Pasha Caravanserai (Turkish: Rüstem Paşa Kervansarayı) is a caravanserai located in Edirne (formerly Adrianople in English), northwestern Turkey, commissioned by Ottoman statesman and grand vizier Rüstem Pasha and built by court architect Mimar Sinan in 1561. The building is used today as a hotel with 110 rooms, the interior having been remodelled in 2016–18.

It is a two-storey rectangular construction with courtyard and hammam, housing 21 shops in the front part. In the courtyard there used to be a well area and a prayer room; these were destroyed during the Russo-Turkish War (1877–1878). The commercial courtyard was for centuries a marketing place for domestic silk moths, which were raised in the area of Edirne.

The building was restored in 1972 and converted into a hotel. The restoration, led by architect Ertan Cakirlar, was among the first to receive the Aga Khan Award for Architecture.
