= Rüstem Pasha Caravanserai (Erzurum) =

- Rüstem Paşa Kervansarayı
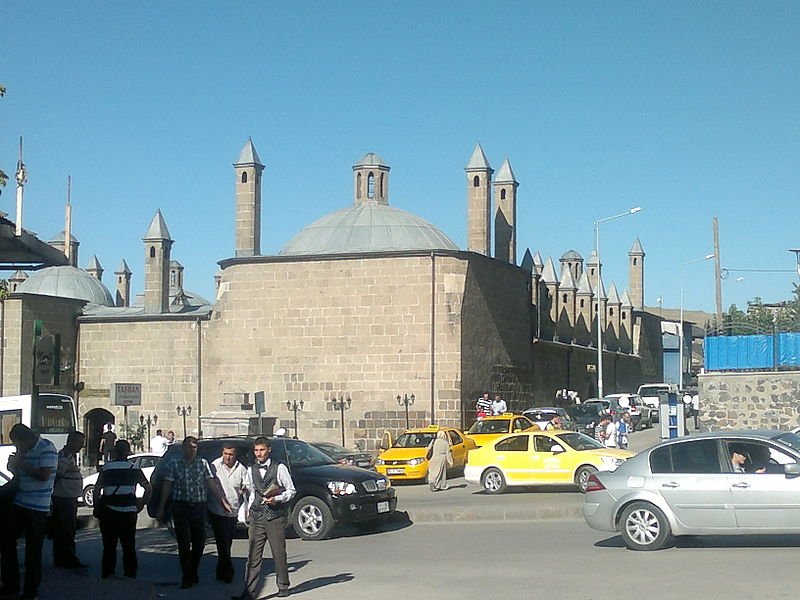
- A view of the Rüstem Pasha Caravansera (Taşhan).

- Location within Turkey
- Alternative names: Taşhan

General information
- Type: Caravanserai
- Architectural style: Ottoman architecture
- Location: Yakutiye, Erzurum Province, Turkey, Menderes St., Fevziye neighborhood
- Coordinates: 39°54′32″N 41°16′26″E
- Completed: 1561; 465 years ago
- Renovated: 1965; 61 years ago

Design and construction
- Main contractor: Rüstem Pasha

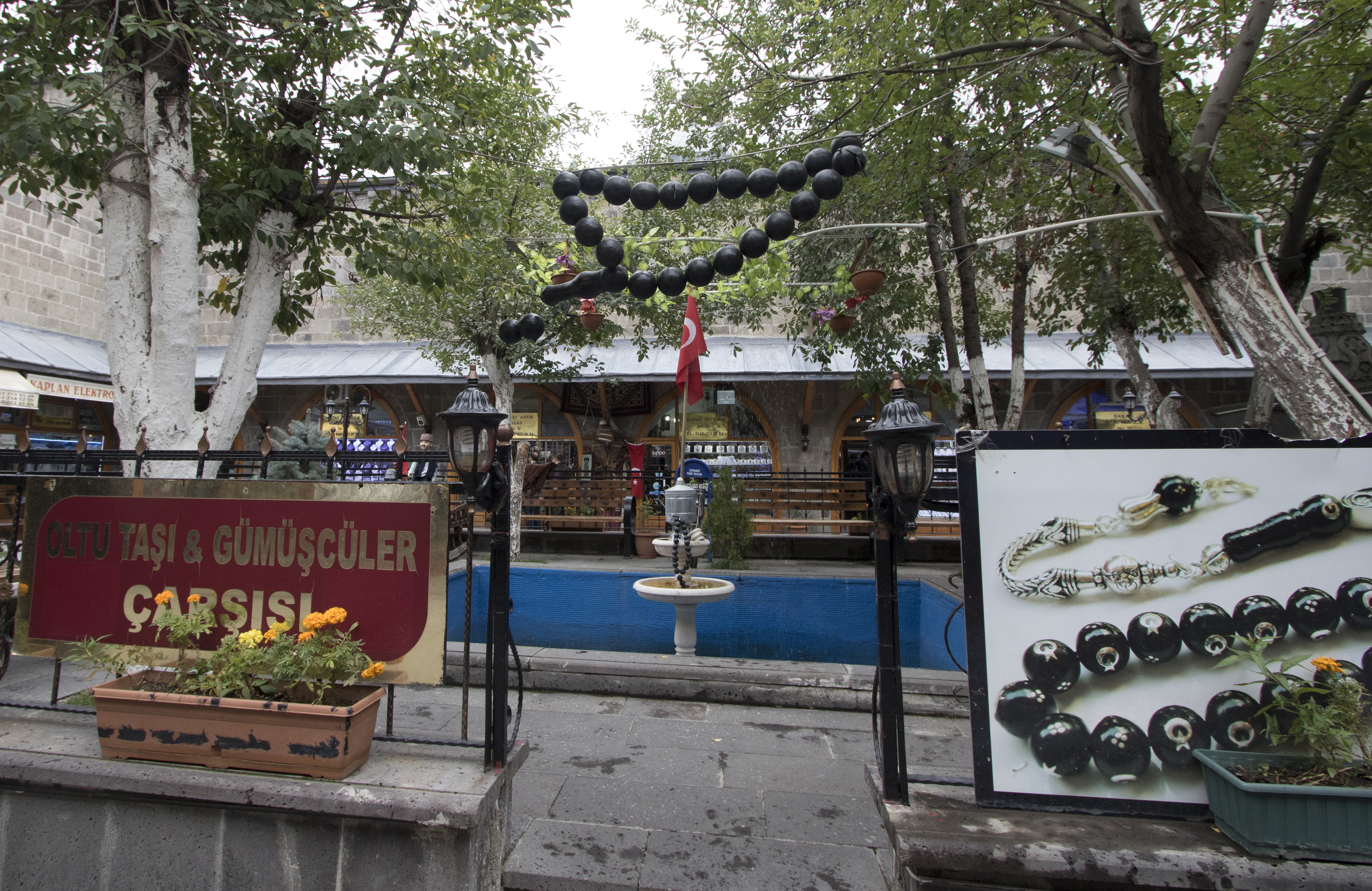
A view of the courtyard with the scuipture of Oltu stone prayer beads and jewellery shops in the background.

Rüstem Pasha Caravanserai (Turkish: Rüstem Paşa Kervansarayı), also known as Taşhan, is a caravanserai located in Yakutiye district of Erzurum, eastern Turkey, built by Ottoman statesman and grand vizier Rüstem Pasha in 1561.

== Location ==
Rüstem Pasha Caravanserai is located on Menderes Street at Fevziye neighborhood in Yakutiye district of Erzurum, eastern Turkey.

== History ==
The caravanserai was commissioned by Rüstem Pasha (c. 1500–1561), Ottoman statesman and grand vizier of Sultan Suleiman the Magnificent (reigned 1520–1566). Completed in 1561, it served the travelers and met all their needs day and night. It contained a hospice, a small mosque, resting places, shops, stables for keeping camels, donkeys, oxen, buffaloes and horses. Not all of the original building parts survived. The inscription over the entrance gate reads as "This is a border post" (Ottoman Turkish: ribat) due to the position of Erzurum as a border city at that time. 40 to 50 men strong raider troops were stationed at the border posts, or outposts. After the eastern borders of the Ottoman Empire territory were extended out to Tbilisi and Caspian Sea, the mansions, shelters, barns and shops were added to the caravanserai.

== Architecture ==
Rüstem Pasha Caravanserai is an important example of a caravanserai in Ottoman architecture. The two-story ashlar building surrounds a rectangular courtyard. The courtyard has an entrance in the west and the east. The gates hare pointed arched and vaulted. The building has 32 rooms, which are situated behind verandas looking to the courtyard. The upper rooms are flat vaulted. The ornaments found here were added in a later time.

The caravanserai underwent a major restoration in 1965. A slight supercumbent was added to the western facade of the building that created an office room for the caravanserai manager over the barrel vaulted entrance, which became a bit longer.

== Today ==
The caravanserai, locally known as "Taşhan" for "stoney commercial building", today houses around hundred workshops and souvenir shops. Many of which sell prayer beads, rings and necklaces, made of local Oltu stone.
