= Şehzade Cihangir =

Ottoman prince (1531–1553)

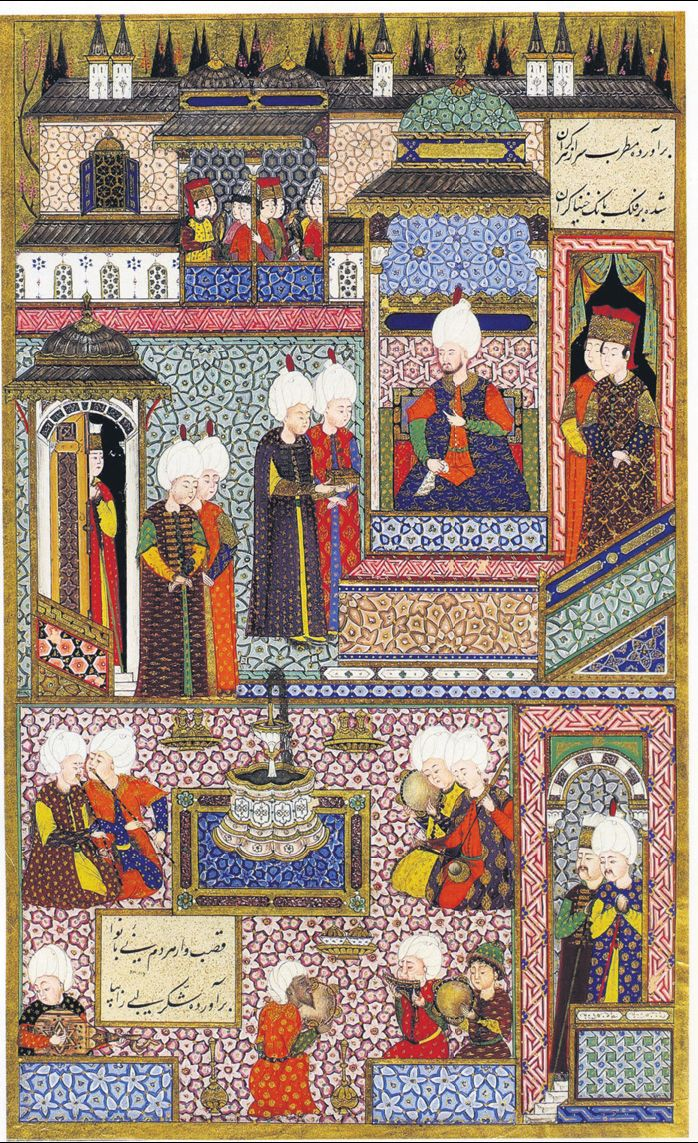
- Cihangir's circumcision, 1539
- Born: 1531; Old Palace, Constantinople, Ottoman Empire (present day Istanbul, Turkey)
- Died: 27 November 1553 (aged 21–22); Aleppo, Ottoman Empire
- Burial: Şehzade Mosque, Istanbul
Names
- Cihangir bin Suleiman Han
- Dynasty: Ottoman
- Father: Suleiman the Magnificent
- Mother: Hürrem Sultan
- Religion: Sunni Islam

Şehzade Cihangir (Ottoman Turkish: شهزاده جهانگير; 1531 – 27 November 1553) was an Ottoman prince, the sixth and youngest child of Sultan Suleiman the Magnificent and his wife Hürrem Sultan.

== Life ==
Cihangir was born in 1531 in Constantinople during the reign of his father, Suleiman the Magnificent. His mother was Hürrem Sultan, an Orthodox priest's daughter, who was the current Sultan's concubine at the time. In 1533 or 1534, his mother, Hürrem, was freed and became Suleiman's legal wife. He had four elder brothers, Şehzade Mehmed, Şehzade Selim (future Selim II), Şehzade Bayezid and Şehzade Abdullah, who died at three years old, and an elder sister Mihrimah Sultan. He was educated together with his older brothers under supervision of his time. He wrote poems with the pen name Zarifi, and was also interested in calligraphy.

Between 26 November and 8 December 1539, a ceremony was held celebrating the circumcision of Cihangir and his elder brother Bayezid. The entire city and palace were involved in the elaborate event. Representatives from Ferdinand I, the French, and the Venetians were present. The joyous atmosphere included participation from viziers, governors-general, district governors, palace members, janissaries, scholars, and city residents. The occasion also marked the wedding of their sister Mihrimah and Rüstem Pasha.

Cihangir was born with a spinal malformation, necessitating continuous monitoring and treatment. As a result, he did not receive a provincial governorate because his infirmity was seen as a disqualification for rulership and perhaps also because of his need for medical treatment. In one of his letters to the sultan while he was on military campaign, his mother wrote of the success of an operation performed on the child's shoulder. As the youngest child in the family and as a result of his disability, Cihangir was loved and treated exclusively.

In March 1547, Cihangir and his mother travelled to Manisa, visiting his older brother Selim, who had been transferred there after Mehmed's death in 1543, and spent a month there. In 1548, he accompanied his father to the second Iran expedition. He was widely acknowledged as a clever and entertaining conversationalist. He was his father's constant companion. His father had acknowledged the probability of his elder half-brother Şehzade Mustafa's success. However, Cihangir ventured that his physical deformity would allow him to escape the princely fate of fratricide, to which his father responded, "My son, Mustafa, will become the sultan and will deprive you all of your lives."

== Death ==
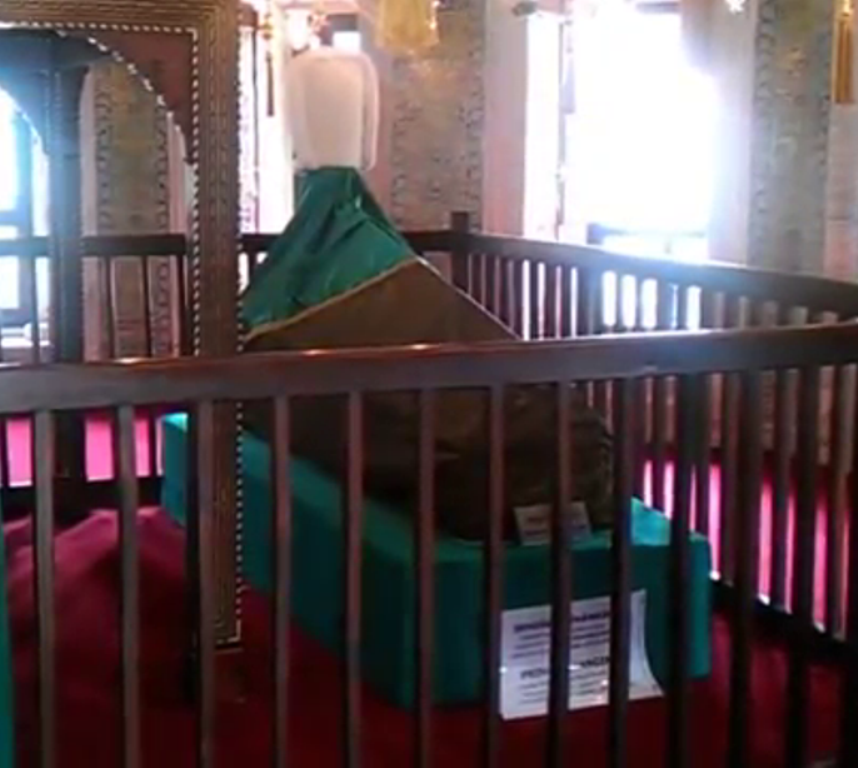
The tomb of Şehzade Cihangir inside Şehzade Mosque

In the third Iran expedition, Cihangir together with his father departed from Istanbul and reached the plains of Ereğli. Şehzade Mustafa, also arrived with his troops from Konya, where he was strangled by their father's guards on 6 October 1553. Since Cihangir died in Aleppo not long after this incident on 27 November 1553, it became a popularized theory that he had died as a result of shock and grief caused by his half-brother's execution. One source even tried to claim that he committed suicide on hearing the news. However, this has largely been dismissed as inaccurate due to the lack of supporting evidence of any closeness between the two brothers. Rather it is now understood that Cihangir's passing came as a direct result of the chronic health problems he was documented as having throughout his life.

After his death, his body was taken to Istanbul where he was buried alongside his older brother Şehzade Mehmed in the Şehzade Mosque. The Istanbul neighborhood of Cihangir was named after Şehzade Cihangir when his father had Mimar Sinan build a wooden mosque there in 1559 to commemorate his death. The area, which overlooks the Bosphorous, was one of Cihangir's favorite places. The neighborhood's name comes from this mosque.

== In popular culture ==
- In the 2003 Turkish TV miniseries, Hürrem Sultan, Cihangir was played by Turkish actor Engin Hepileri.
- In the television series Muhteşem Yüzyıl, Cihangir is played by Turkish actor Tolga Sarıtaş.

== Bibliography ==
- Peirce, Leslie P. (1993). The imperial harem : women and sovereignty in the Ottoman Empire. New York. ISBN 0-19-507673-7. OCLC 27811454.
- Yermolenko, Galina (April 2005). Roxolana: "The Greatest Empresse of the East. DeSales University, Center Valley, Pennsylvania.
- Şahin, K. (2023). Peerless Among Princes: The Life and Times of Sultan Süleyman. Oxford University Press. ISBN 978-0-19-753163-1.
- Turgut, Ali Ç.; Turgut, Yaşar B.; Turgut, Mehmet (2015-11-21). "Neurological disease of Şehzade Cihangir in the Ottoman history: spinal dysraphism". Child's Nervous System. 32 (5). Springer Science and Business Media LLC: 765–767. doi:10.1007/s00381-015-2965-2. ISSN 0256-7040. PMID 26590593.
