= Hürrem Sultan =

Haseki Sultan of the Ottoman Empire

- "La Sultana Rossa" (Sultan Roxelana), a painting by the Italian artist Titian (Tiziano Vecellio), depicting Hürrem Sultan, c. 1550

Haseki Sultan of the Ottoman Empire (Imperial Consort)
- Tenure: May 1534 – 15 April 1558
- Predecessor: Position established
- Successor: Nurbanu Sultan
- Born: c. 1505; Rohatyn, Ruthenia, Kingdom of Poland (now Ukraine)
- Died: 15 April 1558 (aged 52–53); Topkapı Palace, Constantinople, Ottoman Empire (now Istanbul, Turkey)
- Burial: Süleymaniye Mosque, Istanbul
- Spouse: Suleiman I (m. 1534)
- Issue: Şehzade Mehmed; Mihrimah Sultan; Selim II; Şehzade Abdullah; Şehzade Bayezid; Şehzade Cihangir
Names
- Turkish: Hürrem Sultan; Ottoman Turkish: خرم سلطان
- Dynasty: Ottoman (by marriage)
- Religion: Sunni Islam (conversion); Eastern Orthodox Christian (birth)
- Seal

Hürrem Sultan (Turkish pronunciation: [hyɾˈɾæm suɫˈtan]; Ottoman Turkish: خرّم سلطان; c. 1505 – 15 April 1558), also known as Roxelana, was the chief consort and legal wife of Ottoman sultan Suleiman the Magnificent, mother of his successor Selim II, and the first haseki sultan of the Ottoman Empire. She became one of the most powerful and influential women in Ottoman history, and the first in a series of prominent women who lived during the period that came to be known as the Sultanate of Women. She is commonly considered the most powerful Haseki Sultan of the Ottoman Empire.

Presumably born in Ruthenia to a Ruthenian Orthodox family, she was captured by Crimean Tatars during a slave raid and eventually taken via the Crimean trade to Constantinople, the Ottoman capital.

She entered the imperial harem, rose through the ranks and became the favorite concubine of Sultan Suleiman. Breaking Ottoman tradition, he unprecedentedly freed and married Hürrem, making her his legal wife. Sultans had previously married only foreign freeborn noblewomen, if at all, and even then they usually reproduced through slave concubines. She remained in the sultan's court for the rest of her life, enjoying an extremely loving and intimate relationship with her husband, and having at least six children with him, including the future sultan, Selim II, which makes her an ancestor of all the following sultans and present descendants of the Ottoman dynasty. Of Hürrem's six known children, five were male, breaking one of the oldest Ottoman customs according to which each concubine could only give the sultan one male child, to maintain a balance of power between the various women. However, not only did Hürrem bear more children to the sultan after the birth of her first son in 1521, but she was also the mother of all of Suleiman's children born after her entry in the harem at the very beginning of his reign.

Hürrem eventually wielded enormous power, influencing and playing a central role in the politics of the Ottoman Empire. The correspondence between Suleiman and Hürrem, unavailable until the nineteenth century, along with Suleiman's own diaries, confirms her status as the Sultan's most trusted confidant and adviser. During his frequent absences, the pair exchanged passionate love letters. Hürrem included political information and warned of potential uprisings. She also played an active role in the affairs of the empire and even intervened in affairs between the empire and her former home, apparently helping Poland attain its privileged diplomatic status. She supposedly brought a "feminine touch" to diplomatic relations, sending diplomatic letters accompanied by personally embroidered articles to foreign leaders and their relatives. Two of these notable contemporaries were Sigismund II Augustus, King of Poland and Grand Duke of Lithuania, and Mahinbanu Sultan, the favorite sister and intimate counselor of Tahmasp I, who exchanged official letters with Hürrem as well as with an Ottoman imperial princess who was probably Mihrimah Sultan, daughter of Hürrem and Suleiman.

Hürrem patronized major public works (including the Haseki Sultan Complex and the Hürrem Sultan Hamam). She died in April 1558, in Constantinople and was buried in an elegant and beautifully adorned mausoleum adjacent to the site where her husband would join her eight years later in another mausoleum within the grand Süleymaniye Mosque complex in Istanbul.

== Name ==
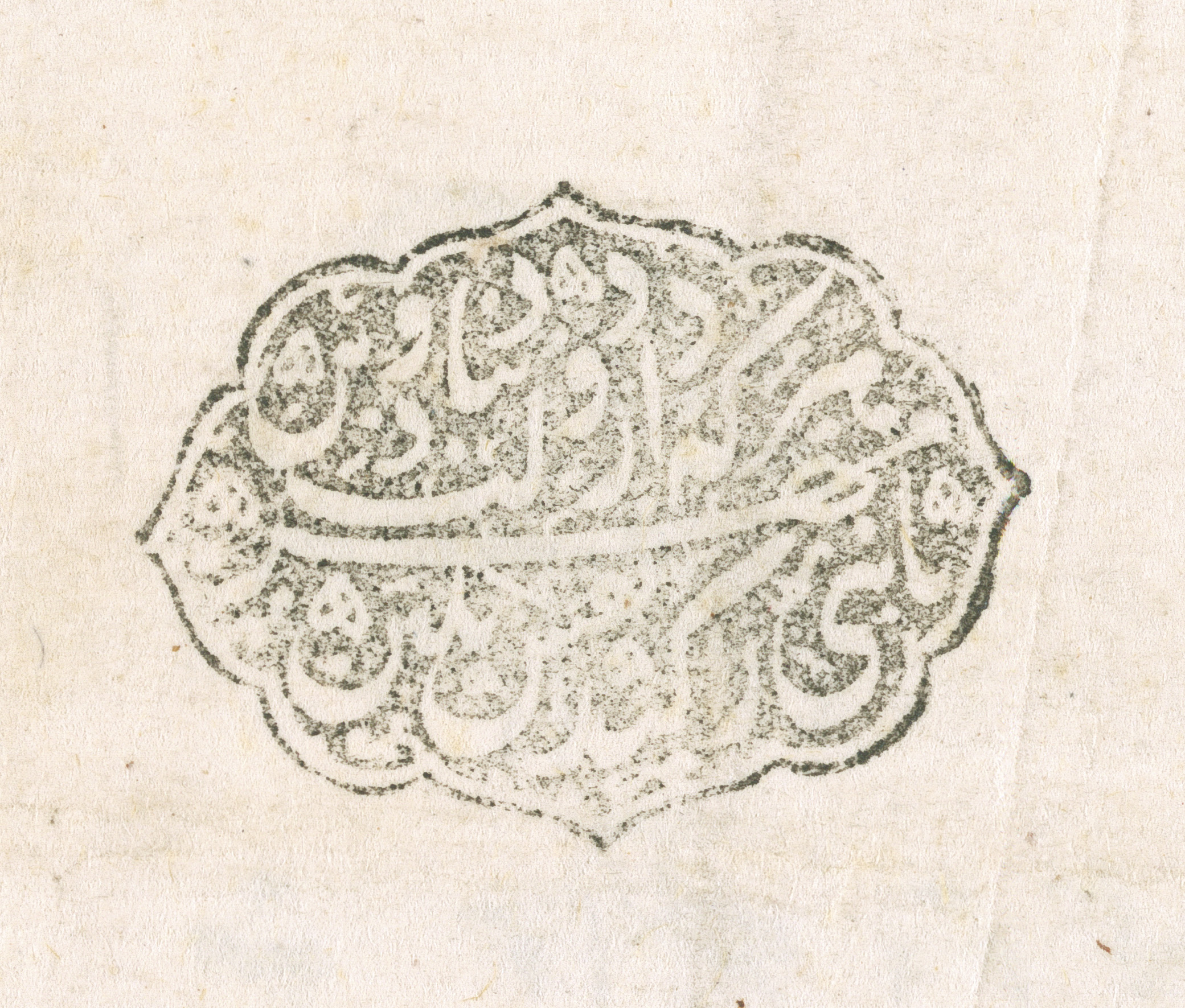
Seal of Hürrem Sultan in a 1548 letter addressed to Sigismund II Augustus

According to Leslie P. Peirce, her birth name is unknown. Primary sources of the 16th century do not record the premarital name and surname of Hürrem Sultan. In Polish tradition, her name was Alexandra, and in Ukrainian, she was called Anastasia. American researcher Galina Yermolenko suggests that the name Anastasia (or Nastya) had arisen in literature under the influence of folklore and, referring to Mykhailo Orlich, cites a Bukovinian folk song derived from Mauritius Goslavsky's poem "Podilla" (1827). It is not known how original those stories are and whether they date back to before 1880, when the name Anastasia Lisovska first appeared in Mykhailo Orlovsky's Roksolana or Anastasia Lisovskaya. Her father's supposed name — Gavrylo Lisovsky — first appeared in works of fiction as well.

In European reports and accounts, Hürrem was always referred to as Rossa, Rosselana, Roxelana, Roxolana, or Roksolana (the latter two are also transliterations from Ukrainian: Роксолана). This name was first used by the Holy Roman Empire ambassador Ogier Ghiselin de Busbecq in his compendium Turkish Letters (published in 1581 under the name Itinera Constantinopolitanum et Amasianum).

Among the Ottomans, she was known mainly as Haseki Hürrem Sultan or Hürrem Haseki Sultan. Hürrem or Khurrem (خرم) means "the joyful and endearing one" in Persian. However, "Hürrem" was most likely not her first Ottoman name, especially as Suleiman is said to have named her himself. In the naming rite that masters arrogated to themselves, male and female owners often played the poet. They chose to confer — to impose — on their female slaves the names of flowers, precious stones, and other pleasures of life. For imperial concubines, endless variations of "rose", "grace", and "delicacy" were always in vogue. Hürrem must have acquired such a name upon her acceptance of Islam before she entered the imperial harem and became Suleiman's new concubine, but this name, if it existed, remains lost to history.

== Origin ==
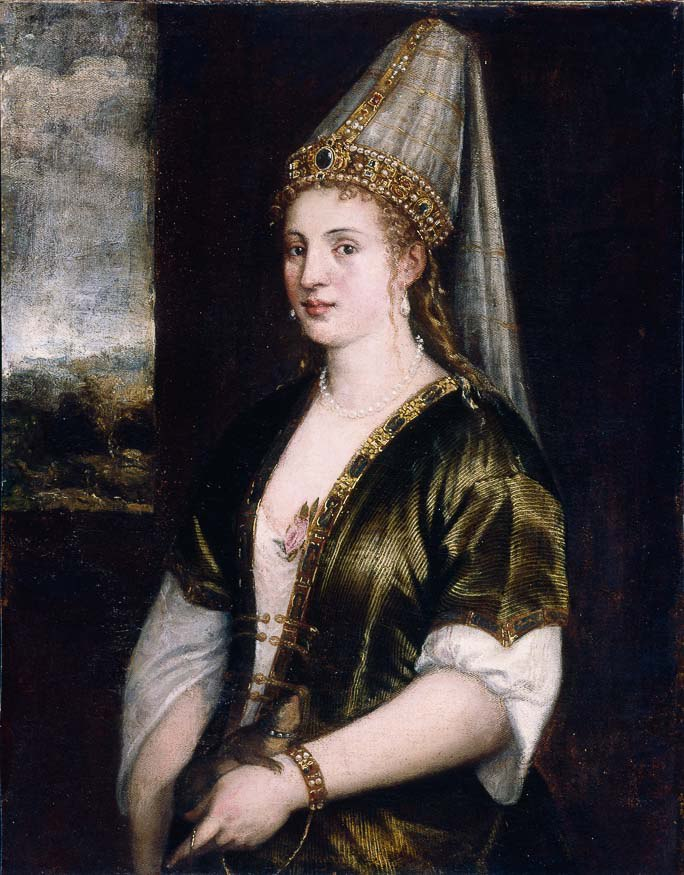
Roxelana, "Portrait of a Woman" (La Sultana Rossa) c. 1550, Workshop of Titian.

While no documentation exists about Hürrem's life before she entered the harem, legends about her origins arose in literary works. It has been claimed that she was of Ukrainian, Russian, or Polish origin.

Many sources state that Hürrem came from Ruthenia, which was then part of the Polish Crown. Ogier Ghiselin de Busbecq called her "Roxelana" based on her supposed origin from the Ruthenian territory in the Polish-Lithuanian Commonwealth, at the time often known as Roxolania (from the Roxolani people mentioned by Strabo as inhabitants of the northern Black Sea region). Samuel Twardowski in his poem "The Great Embassy" (written between 1621 and 1623, published in 1633) noted that her father was an Orthodox priest from Rohatyn (now a city in Ivano-Frankivsk Oblast, Ukraine). Michalo Lituanus, former ambassador of the Grand Duchy of Lithuania to the Crimean Khanate in the mid-16th century, wrote that "the wife of the present Turkish emperor who loves her dearly — mother of his primogenital [first] son who will govern after him, was kidnapped from our land". (Note: The title of his book is De moribus tartarorum, lituanorum et moscorum or On the customs of Tatars, Lithuanians and Moscovians.)

The Venetian ambassador Bernardo Navagero called Hürrem "[donna] … di nazione russa". Another Venetian ambassador, Giovanni Battista Trevisano, called her "Sultana, ch'è di Rusi". The Venetian military leader Marco Antonio Bragadin also called Hürrem "donna di nazione russa". The belief that Hürrem was of Russian rather than Ukrainian origin may have resulted from the eventual misinterpretation of the words Rosselana and Rossa.

During the reign of Selim I, sometime between 1512 and 1520, the Tatars of the Crimean Khanate kidnapped her during one of their slave raids in Eastern Europe. The Tatars may have first taken her to the Crimean city of Kaffa, a major centre of the Ottoman slave trade, before she was taken to Constantinople.

According to Kutbeddin el-Mekki, an envoy of the sharif of Mecca, and the memoirs of Shaykh Qutb al-Din al-Nahrawali, a Meccan religious figure who visited Constantinople in 1558, she had been a servant in the household of Hançerli Hanzade Fatma Zeynep Sultan, daughter of Şehzade Mahmud and granddaughter of Sultan Bayezid II, who gifted her to Suleiman when he rose to the throne.

== Relationship with Suleiman ==
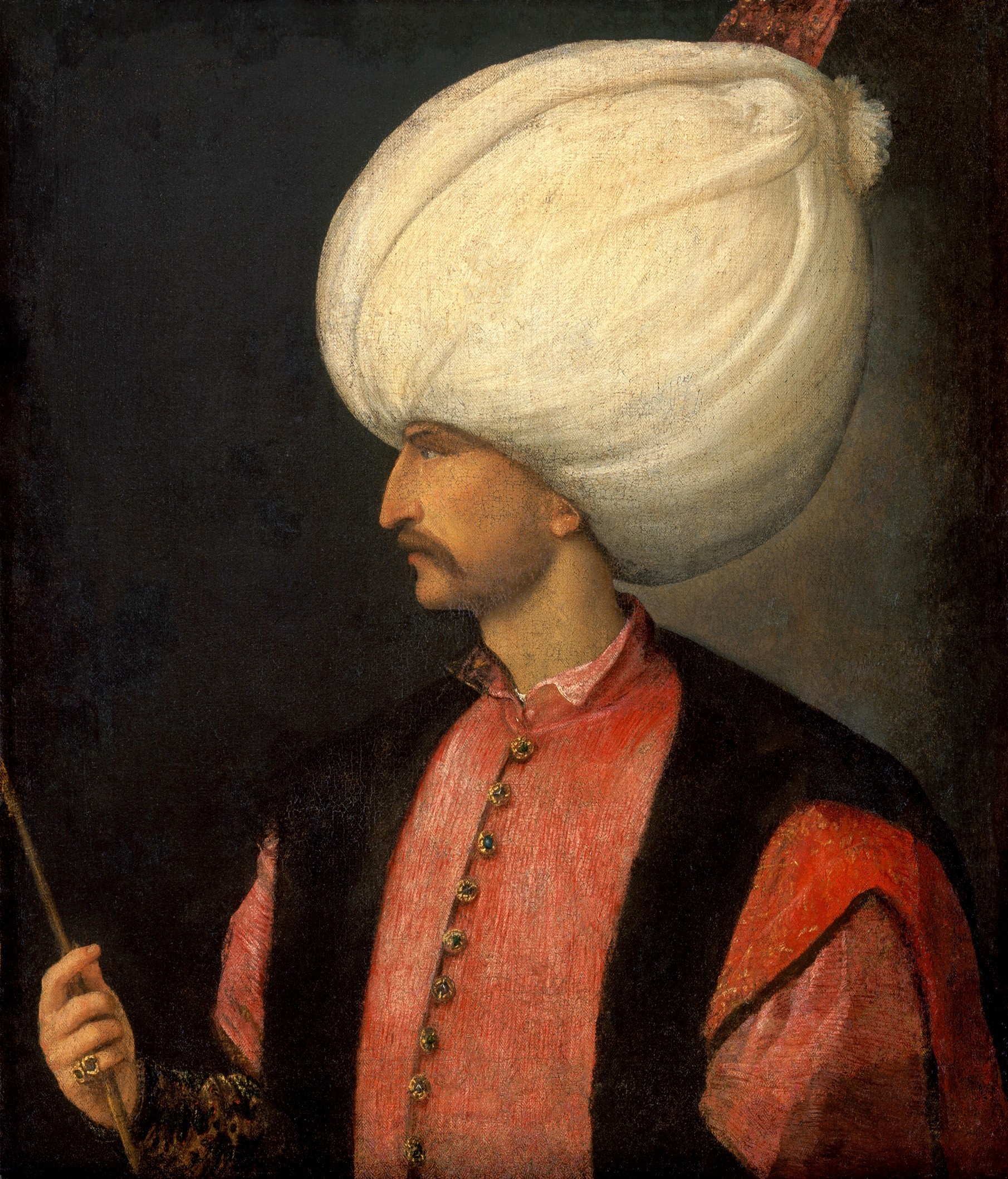
Suleiman the Magnificent

Hürrem Sultan likely entered the harem around fifteen years of age. The precise year that she entered the harem is not recorded, but it's accepted that she became Suleiman's new favourite concubine around the time he became the sultan in 1520, because their first child was born in 1521.

Hürrem's unprecedented rise from a harem slave to Suleiman's legal wife attracted immense jealousy, acrimony and disfavor not only in the harem, but also from the general populace. By the early 1520s, she had become Suleiman's most prominent consort beside Mahidevran Hatun (c.1500), who was the mother of Suleiman's eldest surviving son. Before devoting himself exclusively to Hürrem and becoming monogamous, Suleiman had followed the precedent of his ancestors and taken a number of concubines when he was a prince but after becoming the sultan, he fell deeply in love with his new concubine, Hürrem.

Marco Minio, who was in Constantinople from September 1521 to January 1522, noted in his official report that Suleiman frequently visited the Old Palace around that time which was interpreted that as a sign of lasciviousness. However, these visits must have been related to the burgeoning relationship between him and Hürrem as by the fall of 1524, it was common knowledge in Constantinople that the sultan spent his nights with the same woman and did not seek other sexual partners. Besides, the sultan having recently lost three of his children – Şehzade Mahmud, Şehzade Murad and Raziye Sultan in the fall of 1521, all of a sudden – must have also paid these visits to closely monitor the rearing and health of his children. For instance, a marginal note in a revenue register records significant sums of money paid by the sultan and his mother to a healer named Abdi Dede for Şehzade Mehmed's recovery from an unspecified illness. Indeed, by 1524, when Suleiman and Hürrem had [three] children, the ambassador Zen could comment that "the Seigneur is not lustful" and that he "remained constant to one woman". According to Luigi Bassano, Suleiman ignored the past custom of the sultans and did not take a succession of concubines; rather, to preserve his faithfulness to Hürrem, he married off, as virgins, nearly all the eligible concubines in his harem. While the relationship between Suleiman and Hürrem deepened through mutual devotion, love and many children, Mahidevran must have maintained a level of prestige as the mother of Suleiman's eldest surviving son. However, in 1526, the ambassador Bragadin reported that the sultan no longer paid any attention to Mahidevran, but concentrated and lavished all his love and affection on Hürrem. Bragadin further reported that, after Suleiman had turned away from her, Mahidevran spent all her time caring for her son who was her "whole joy".

After the birth of their first child in 1521, Suleiman scandalized the harem by renouncing all other sexual partners and marrying off the other concubines to servitors and favorites. Suleiman fathered at least six children by Hürrem in ten years. While the exact dates for the births of her children are disputed, there is academic consensus that the births of her first five children – Şehzade Mehmed, Mihrümah or Mihrimah Sultan, Şehzade Selim, Şehzade Abdullah and Şehzade Bayezid – occurred quickly over the next five to six years. Suleiman and Hürrem's last son, Şehzade Cihangir was born later, around 1531, with what appears to have been a deformity of his shoulder, but by that time Hürrem had borne enough healthy sons to secure the future of the Ottoman dynasty. That Hürrem was allowed to give birth to more than one son was an utter violation of one of the oldest imperial harem principles: "one concubine mother – one son," which was designed to prevent both the mother's influence over the sultan and the feuds of full-brothers for the throne. She was to bear the majority of Suleiman's children. Hürrem gave birth to her first son Mehmed in 1521 (who died in 1543) and then to at least four more sons, destroying Mahidevran's status as the mother of the sultan's only surviving son.

Suleiman's mother, Hafsa Sultan, partially suppressed the rivalry between the two women. According to Bernardo Navagero's report, as a result of the bitter rivalry a fight between the two women broke out, with Mahidevran beating and humiliating Hürrem, which enraged Suleiman. Peirce concurs to the episode's authenticity but considers it embellished to at least some extent especially given the staunch decorum of the harem. Peirce wondered whether Mahidevran had an irascible personality or was prone to violence but all other references to her in Venetian reports were apparently exemplary but the incident doesn't seem preposterous to her as Mahidevran's self-defense to the sultan—the assault on her rank as senior concubine—is wholly plausible.

Another incident reported in 1526 by Pietro Bragadin delineated Suleiman's deep devotion to Hürrem and that very early in her career she felt secure enough in his esteem to exert her will, and that the sultan was willing to bend protocol to preserve their relationship:

"The sultan was given by a sanjak bey [provincial governor] two beautiful Russian maidens, one for his mother and one for him. When they arrived in the palace, his second wife [Hürrem], whom he esteems at present, became extremely unhappy and flung herself to the ground weeping. The mother, who had given her maiden to the sultan, was sorry about what she had done, took her back, and sent her to a sanjak bey as wife, and the sultan agreed to send his to another sanjak bey, because his wife would have perished from sorrow if these maidens—or even one of them—had remained in the palace."

The chronicled reactions of Hafsa, Suleiman's mother, and the sultan himself illustrated how they attempted to mollify the distraught Hürrem. Suleiman's mother—custodian of the sultan's conduct—did not or perhaps could not act to prevent this unprecedented relationship.

Prof. Leslie Peirce theorises that it was in early May 1534 that Suleiman married Hürrem— her latest stance about the date of marriage is albeit in contrast to her earlier stance— the former being that the marriage happened prior to 1534 as Suleiman would not have married Hürrem in this particular period in observance of the mourning period owing to the death of his mother, Hafsa Sultan who had died on 19 March 1534 and by 6 June 1534, Suleiman had already left the capital to embark on his first imperial military expedition against the Safavids. This marriage happened in an unprecedentedly magnificent formal ceremony which scandalised the whole empire. Never before had a former slave been elevated to the status of the sultan's lawful spouse, a development which astonished observers in the palace and in the city.

After the death of Suleiman's mother Hafsa Sultan in 1534, Hürrem's influence in the palace increased even further as she took over the ruling of the Imperial Harem. Either when Suleiman freed and married her, or in the years before, Hürrem was bestowed the title of Haseki Sultan (adding the word sultan to someone's name or title was a royal prerogative). Hürrem became the first consort to receive the title Haseki Sultan. This title, used for a century, reflected the great power of imperial consorts (most of them were former slaves) in the Ottoman court, elevating their status higher than Ottoman princesses. In this case, Suleiman not only broke the old custom, but probably tried to begin a new tradition for the future Ottoman sultans: to marry in a formal ceremony and to give their consorts significant influence on the court, but even then only Osman II (who married a high-ranking Muslim woman) and Ibrahim (who also went through a form of marriage with his concubine) were the exceptions who contracted legal marriages though with much difficulty and which later became one of the reasons that led to the deposition of these two sultans.

Hürrem's salary was 2,000 akçe a day, making her one of the highest-paid Ottoman imperial women. With respect to stipend, mothers of princes before the reign of Suleiman did not enjoy a status much greater than that of the women that followed beginning from Hürrem: in 1513, as the mother of the heir apparent, Hafsa Sultan received a stipend of 150 aspers a day. The gap between Hafsa's stipend and Hurrem's stipend of 2,000 aspers a day at a parallel point in her career only forty years later further underlines the exceptional nature of Suleiman's treatment of Hürrem. Suleiman's singularity as a sultan in remaining faithful and loving to only one woman and then unprecedentedly marrying her amidst unmatched majestic pomp, made Hürrem to be widely deemed a sorceress who by the use of potions, charms, and magic arts had bewitched and completely captured the sultan's heart and soul.

Especially after the death of Suleiman's mother, Hafsa Sultan, in 1534, Hürrem became Suleiman's most trusted news source. In one of her letters to Suleiman, she informs him about the situation of the plague in the capital. She wrote, "My dearest Sultan! If you ask about Istanbul, the city still suffers from the plague; however, it is not like the previous one. God willing, it will go away as soon as you return to the city. Our ancestors said that the plague goes away once the trees shed their leaves in autumn." Later, Hürrem became the first woman to remain in the sultan's court for the rest of her life. In the Ottoman imperial family tradition, a sultan's consort was to remain in the harem only until her son came of age (around 16 or 17), after which he would be sent away from the capital to govern a faraway province, and his mother would follow him. This tradition was called Sancak Beyliği. The consorts were never to return to Constantinople unless their sons succeeded to the throne.

Remaining in Constantinople, she had already moved out of the harem located in the Old Palace (Eski Saray) and into the Topkapı Palace after her marriage. However, earlier it was often assumed that she and her entourage moved to Topkapı, not because of her marriage but only after a fire in 1541 destroyed much of the Old Palace. Either way, this was another significant break from established customs, as Mehmed the Conqueror had specifically issued a decree to the effect that no women would be allowed to reside in the same building where government affairs were conducted. After Hürrem resided at Topkapı it became known as the New Palace (saray-ı jedid).

She wrote many love letters to Suleiman when he was away for campaigns, only seven of which survive today. In one of her letters, she wrote:

"After I put my head on the ground and kiss the soil that your blessed feet step upon, my nation's sun and wealth my sultan, if you ask about me, your servant who has caught fire from the zeal of missing you, I am like the one whose liver (in this case, meaning heart) has been broiled; whose chest has been ruined; whose eyes are filled with tears, who cannot distinguish anymore between night and day; who has fallen into the sea of yearning; desperate, mad with your love; in a worse situation than Ferhat and Majnun, this passionate love of yours, your slave, is burning because I have been separated from you. Like a nightingale, whose sighs and cries for help do not cease, I am in such a state due to being away from you. I would pray to Allah to not afflict this pain even upon your enemies. My dearest sultan! As it has been one-and-a-half months since I last heard from you, Allah knows that I have been crying night and day waiting for you to come back home. While I was crying without knowing what to do, the one and only Allah allowed me to receive good news from you. Once I heard the news, Allah knows, I came to life once more since I had died while waiting for you."

Suleiman's letters to Hürrem, however, did not survive but Muhibbi's plethora of odes did. Suleiman was as magnificent a poet as he was an emperor. He used to compose often under the nom de plume of 'Muhibbi' which meant 'Lover' in Arabic. Following the tradition of diwan poetry, the Sultan becomes his loved one's servant and accepts the suffering and sacrifice caused by neglect.

A sensually fervent poem by Muhibbi:

"Now that you have a free hand,
Kiss the coral lips of your sweetheart,
First press your face to hers,
Then kiss her enchanting eyes!
Your head is crowned with glory,
For you are at her feet!
Take her lips in your mouth,
Be a man, kiss and embrace her properly, with all your heart, body and soul,
There is no sugar sweeter than her, she tastes like wine
She is the one who serves you drinks,
Bow down before her, kiss her clothes.
When her hands are busy playing games,
Close your arms around and caress her,
Fondle her sweet-scented eyebrows,
And the beauty spot that smells sweet.
Muhibbi, she is the gift from Allah to you!
Appreciate her at her true worth
Without ceasing to lavish caresses on her neck,
Kiss her smiling lips again and again."

Yet, Muhibbi's most famous ode to Hürrem remains this:

"Throne of my lonely niche, my wealth, my love, my moonlight.
My most sincere friend, my confidant, my very existence, my Sultan, my one and only love.
The most beautiful among the beautiful...
My springtime, my merry faced love, my daytime, my sweetheart, laughing leaf...
My plants, my sweet, my rose, the one only who does not distress me in this world...
My Istanbul, my Karaman, the earth of my Anatolia
My Badakhshan, my Baghdad and Khorasan
My woman of the beautiful hair, my love of the slanted brow, my love of eyes full of mischief...
I'll sing your praises always
I, lover of the tormented heart, Muhibbi of the eyes full of tears, I am happy."

Suleiman may well have composed this oft-quoted verse letter for his new wife during his first Iranian campaign. In the fifth couplet, she is the empire that he knows intimately but also the eastern lands that he may never possess. By convention, the poet often included his pen name in the final line of a poem; Sultan Suleiman, however, also enshrines the memory of his Empress by pairing her name with his own.

== State affairs ==
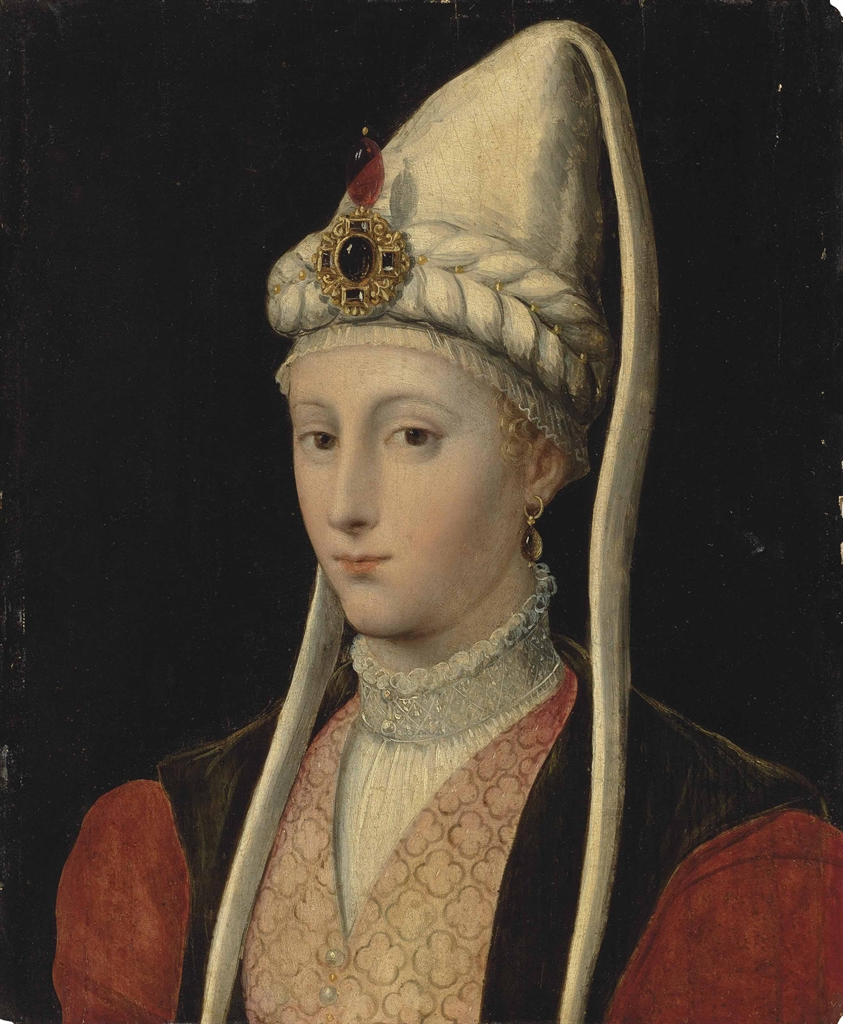
Portrait of Hürrem Sultan by a follower of Titian, 16th century.

Hürrem Sultan is known as the first woman in Ottoman history to concern herself with state affairs. She was able to achieve what no concubine before her could. She officially became the sultan's wife, and although there were no legal barriers against the marriage, the weight of custom militated against it; custom often had the force of law in Ottoman society so that not only the entire Ottoman court but also the general populace were gravely astonished and displeased. The wedding probably took place around 1533, although the exact date of this event remains unknown. Hürrem's position was unique, as was the title of Haseki Sultan.

=== State Affairs and Administration ===
Suleiman, as a warrior sultan spent nearly 10 years of his reign on military campaigns away from the capital and consequently he needed someone very reliable to provide him with information about the situation in the palace, administration and on the situations of the capital – he chose Hürrem Sultan. In the letters to her husband beginning from the 1530s – when she had acquired dexterous command over Turkish – she conveyed the greetings of the statesmen and the Sheikh-ul-Islam and talked about the problems in Istanbul. A letter she sent to him during the Iranian campaign is one of the best examples of this:

"My Sultan, if you ask about the city; for now the disease is still continuing. But it is not like before... My Sultan, I beg you to send your blessed letter often. Because, God is not lying, if a week or two pass and the messenger does not come, the whole world will be in a panic. All kinds of things will be said. Otherwise, do not think that I only want it for my own self. My Sultan, now there is a noise in the city that the herald of good news is coming. Everyone is ready for the city fleet. My Sultan, you are wintering in Aleppo with the state, after that the kizilbash's (Shah Tahmasp's) son and wife were not caught, there is nothing yet. Now he is not there, there is not there; the coming of the herald of good news is not pleasant for anyone."

Hürrem was one of the most educated women in the world at that time and she played a central role in the political life of the Ottoman Empire. Thanks to her brilliance, she acted as Suleiman's chief adviser on matters of state, and had an influence upon foreign policy and international politics. She freely communicated with the ambassadors of European countries, corresponded and liaised with the rulers of Venice and Persia, and stood by Suleiman at receptions and banquets. She imprinted her seal, used to sign important state documents in his absence on behalf of him, personally attended Imperial council meetings even during the presence and absence of Sultan, held meetings with Grand Viziers and ministers to discuss regarding state affairs and corresponded with ambassadors and Foreign rulers, particularly with Sigismund II Augustus. She played a major role in the creation of the Polish-Ottoman alliance.

She also personally corresponded with ambassadors of various nations which includes Republic of Venice, Kingdom of Poland, Safavid dynasty and even the Habsburgs. She often received gifts from the courts of various nations and the ambassadors often conveyed their concerns and thanksgiving to the ottomans through her. She therefore acted as a mediator between the Ottoman Imperial court and foreign empires, reshaping the foreign affairs and conveying the concerns and thanksgivings of ambassadors of various nations to the Ottoman imperial court.

She had acquired the power to even make and unmake viziers and other officials in her own stead. She was very influential in the appointments of ministers, grand viziers and even Sheikh-ul-Islam and ensured that the entire Imperial council would be loyal to her. She also persuade to appoint Rüstem Pasha, her key ally and her son-in-law to be the grand vizier, so that she can have complete control over the Ottoman administration and decision making and ensuring that no one can challenge her. She also eliminated her rivals from the Imperial court which included even grand viziers like Pargalı Ibrahim Pasha and Kara Ahmed Pasha.

Suleiman not only declared her as his legal wife, but also created an Institutionalized title and position for her as the Haseki sultan of the Ottoman Empire, making her the second most powerful person in the empire and comparable to the queen consorts in Europe and in fact she exercised more powers and authority over the Ottoman state than any other queen consorts have exercised in their states in Europe at that time. With many other revolutionary movements like these, she had started an era in the Ottoman Empire called the Sultanate of Women. Hürrem's influence over Suleiman was so enormous that rumors circulated around the Ottoman court that the sultan had been bewitched.

Suleiman's favor catapulted Hürrem from the status of slave to that of the most powerful woman in the empire.

==== Controversial figure ====
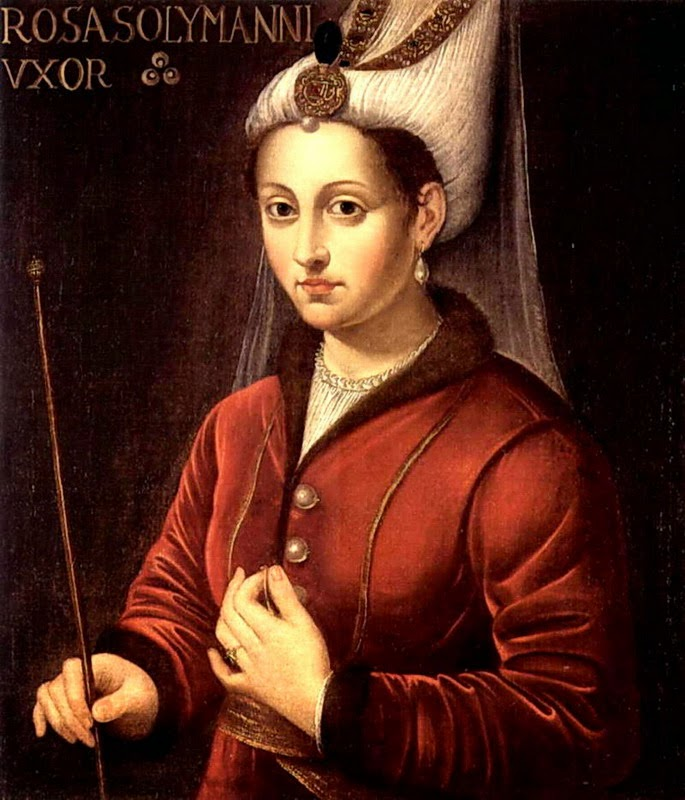
16th-century Latin oil painting of Hürrem Sultan titled Rosa Solymanni Vxor (Rosa, Süleyman's Wife)

Hürrem's influence in state affairs not only made her one of the most influential women, but also a controversial figure in Ottoman history, especially in her rivalry with Mahidevran and her son Şehzade Mustafa, and the grand viziers Pargalı Ibrahim Pasha and Kara Ahmed Pasha.

In the 1550s, Suleiman was left with four surviving sons, şehzades (Ottoman princes): Mustafa, Selim, Bayezid, and Cihangir. Of these, Mahidevran's son Mustafa was the eldest and preceded Hürrem's children in the order of succession. Traditionally, when a new sultan rose to power, he would order all of his brothers killed in order to annihilate any possible power struggles. This practice was called kardeş katliamı, literally "fraternal massacring".

Mustafa was supported by Pargalı Ibrahim Pasha, who became Suleiman's grand vizier in 1523. Hürrem Sultan has usually been held at least partly responsible for the 'intrigues' in nominating a successor. Since the empire lacked, until the reign of Ahmed I (1603–1617), any formal means of nominating a successor, successions usually involved the death of competing princes in order to avert civil unrest and rebellions. In attempting to avoid the execution of her sons, Hürrem used her influence to eliminate those who supported Mustafa's accession to the throne.

A skilled commander of Suleiman's army, Ibrahim eventually fell from grace owing to certain factors including an imprudence committed during a campaign against the Persian Safavid empire during the Ottoman–Safavid War (1532–55), when he arrogated himself a title including the word "Sultan". Another conflict occurred when Ibrahim and his former mentor, the defterdar İskender Çelebi, repeatedly clashed over military leadership and positions during the Safavid war. These incidents launched a series of events which culminated in his execution in 1536 by Suleiman's order, which curiously occurred exactly a year after İskender's execution. It is believed that Hürrem's influence contributed to Suleiman's decision. After three other grand viziers in eight years, Suleiman selected their son-in-law, Damat Rüstem Pasha, husband of Mihrimah, to become the grand vizier. Scholars have wondered if Hürrem's alliance with Mihrimah Sultan and Rüstem Pasha helped secure the throne for one of Hürrem's sons.

Many years later, towards the end of Suleiman's long reign, the rivalry between his sons became evident. Mustafa was later accused of causing unrest and an attempted rebellion. During the campaign against Safavid Persia in 1553, because of fear of rebellion, Suleiman ordered the execution of Mustafa. According to a source he was executed that very year on charges of planning to dethrone his father; his guilt for the treason of which he was accused remains neither proven nor disproven. It is also rumored that Hürrem Sultan conspired against Mustafa with the help of her daughter and son-in-law Rustem Pasha; they wanted to portray Mustafa as a traitor who secretly contacted the Shah of Iran. Acting on Hürrem Sultan's orders, Rustem Pasha had engraved Mustafa's seal and sent a letter seemingly written by him to Shah Tahmasb I, and then sent the shah's response to Suleiman. (Note: Content in this edit is translated from the existing Turkish Wikipedia article at tr :Hürrem Sultan; see its history for attribution.) After the death of Mustafa, Mahidevran lost her status in the palace as the mother of the heir apparent and moved to Bursa. She did not spend her last years in poverty, as Hürrem's son, Selim II, the new sultan after 1566, put her on a lavish salary. Her rehabilitation had been possible after the death of Hürrem in 1558. Cihangir, Hürrem's youngest child, allegedly died of grief a few months after his half-brother's murder.

Although the stories about Hürrem's role in executions of Ibrahim, Mustafa, and Kara Ahmed are very popular, actually none of them are based on first-hand sources. All other depictions of Hürrem, starting with comments by sixteenth and seventeenth-century Ottoman historians as well as by European diplomats, observers, and travellers, are highly derivative and speculative in nature. Because none of these people – neither Ottomans nor foreign visitors – were permitted into the inner circle of the imperial harem, which was surrounded by multiple walls, they largely relied on the testimony of the servants or courtiers or on the popular gossip circulating around Constantinople.

Even the reports of the Venetian ambassadors (baili) at Suleiman's court, the most extensive and objective first-hand Western source on Hürrem to date, were often filled with the authors' own interpretations of the harem rumours. Most other sixteenth-century Western sources on Hürrem, which are considered highly authoritative today – such as Turcicae epistolae (English: The Turkish Letters) of Ogier de Busbecq, the Emissary of the Holy Roman Emperor Ferdinand I at the Porte between 1554 and 1562; the account of the murder of Şehzade Mustafa by Nicholas de Moffan; the historical chronicles on Turkey by Paolo Giovio; and the travel narrative by Luidgi Bassano – derived from hearsay.

=== Foreign policy ===
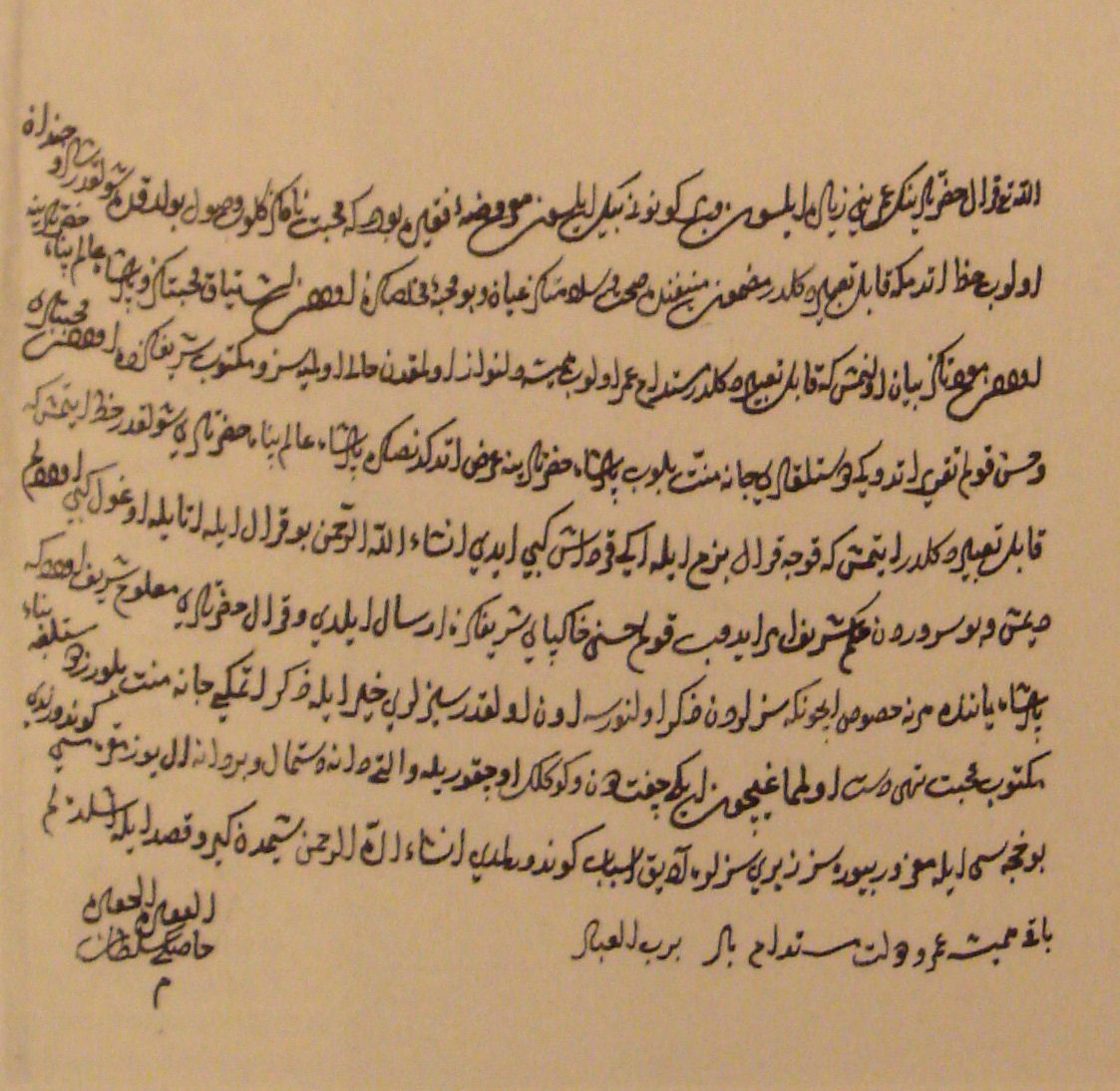
A letter of Hürrem Sultan to Sigismund II Augustus, congratulating him on his accession to the Polish throne in 1549.

Hürrem acted as Suleiman's advisor on matters of state, and seems to have had an influence upon foreign policy and on international politics. Two of her letters to Sigismund II Augustus King of Poland and Grand Duke of Lithuania (reigned 1548–1572) have survived, and during her lifetime the Ottoman Empire generally had peaceful relations with the Polish state within a Polish–Ottoman alliance.

In her first short letter to Sigismund II, Hürrem expresses her highest joy and congratulations to the new king on the occasion of his ascension to the Polish throne after the death of his father Sigismund I the Old in 1548. There was a seal on the back of the letter. For the first and only time in the Ottoman Empire, a female sultan exchanged letters with a king. After that, although Hürrem's successor Nurbanu Sultan and her successor Safiye Sultan exchanged letters with queens, there is no other example of a sultana who personally contacted a king other than Hürrem Sultan. She pleads with the King to trust her envoy Hassan Ağa, who verbally delivered another message from her. Some sentences of the letter sent to Warsaw by Haseki Sultan are as follows:

"We learned that you became the king of Poland after your father passed away. Allah knows the truth of everything; we were very happy and pleased. Light came to our hearts, joy and happiness came to our hearts. We wish your reign to be auspicious, fruitful and long-lasting. The command belongs to Allah Almighty; we advise you to act in accordance with the decrees (orders) of Allah Almighty..."

In her second letter to Sigismund Augustus, written in response to his letter, Hürrem expresses in superlative terms her joy at hearing that the king is in good health and that he sends assurances of his sincere friendliness and attachment towards Sultan Suleiman the Magnificent. She quotes the sultan as saying, "with the old king we were like brothers, and if it pleases the All-Merciful God, with this king we will be as father and son." With this letter, Hurrem sent Sigismund II the gift of two pairs of linen shirts and pants, some belts, six handkerchiefs, and a hand-towel, with a promise to send a special linen robe in the future.

There are reasons to believe that these two letters were more than just diplomatic gestures, and that Suleiman's references to brotherly or fatherly feelings were not a mere tribute to political expediency. The letters also suggest Hürrem's strong desire to establish personal contact with the king. In his 1551 letter to Sigismund II concerning the embassy of Piotr Opaliński, Suleiman wrote that the Ambassador had seen "Your sister and my wife." Whether this phrase refers to a warm friendship between the Polish-Lithuanian monarch and Ottoman Haseki, or whether it suggests a closer relation, the degree of their intimacy definitely points to a special link between the two states at the time.

Some of her embroideries, or at least made under her supervision, have come down to us, such as those given in 1547 to Tahmasp I Shah of Iran and in 1549 to Sigismund II Augustus King of Poland and Grand Duke of Lithuania. Esther Handali acted as her secretary and intermediary on several occasions.

== Charities and patronage ==
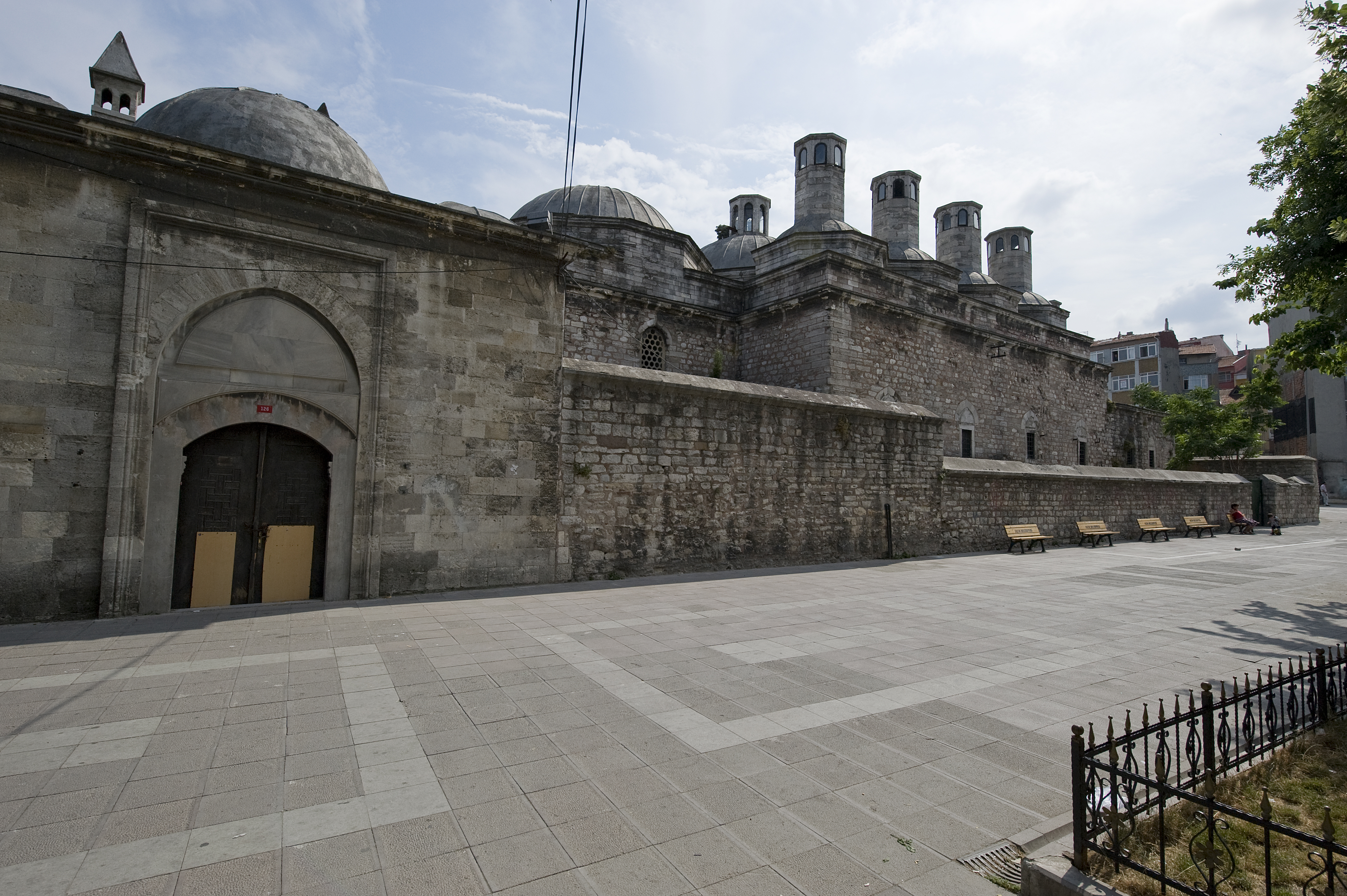
Haseki Sultan Complex designed by the architect Mimar Sinan.

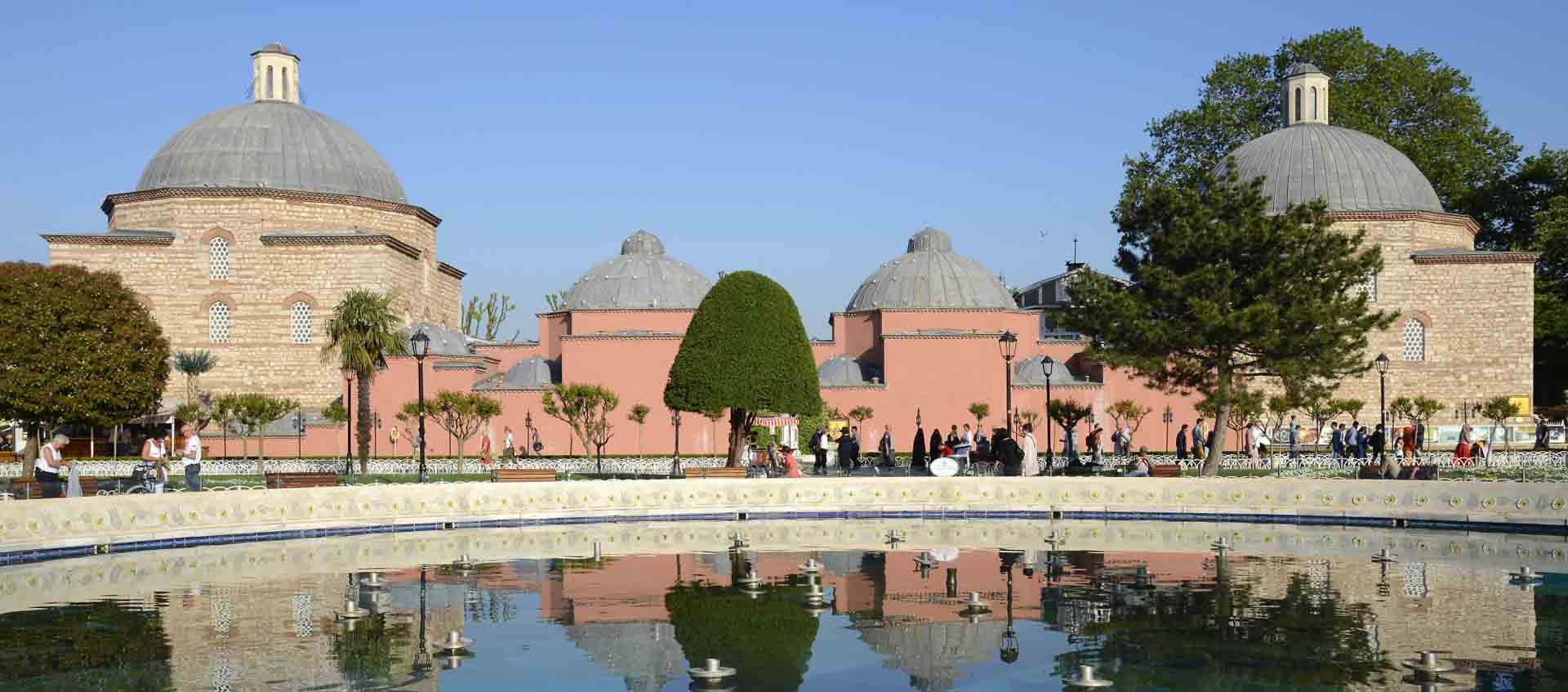
Hürrem Sultan Hamam

Aside from her political concerns, Hürrem was engaged in several major works of public buildings, from Makkah to Jerusalem (Al-Quds), which resembled in part the charitable model of the caliph Harun al-Rashid's consort Zubaida. However, the complete list of all the structures associated with Hürrem Sultan — some built at her personal instigation, others in her name — remains unknown.

Hürrem Sultan's foundations ensured that many thousands would have access to her philanthropy and thus be grateful for her concern (and that of the dynasty) for their well-being. They were situated at key sites in the empire: in the seats of the dynasty in Istanbul and Edirne, in the Muslim Holy Places and in Jerusalem. The earliest was the complex in Constantinople built for her – the first mosque complex sponsored by a royal woman to be built there. It was also the first complex constructed in Constantinople by Mimar Sinan, his largest commission to date which he received when he was appointed in his new position as the chief imperial architect in 1538 after Acem Ali (d.1539). This complex included a mosque, two Quranic schools (madrassa), a fountain, and a women's hospital near the women's slave market (Avret Pazary) in Constantinople (Haseki Sultan Complex). The mosque was designed between 1537 and 1539, the madrasa was completed a year later in 1539–40 and the soup-kitchen in 1540–41. The hospital only got completed around 1550–51. This hospital was beyond unique in not only being the earliest women's hospital in history but also for its concern for mental health catering to mad women for which – unprecedentedly – women attendants were employed. Although the original building has been destroyed, on its site today is Istanbul's modern hospital for women, which is named for Hürrem. The fact that it was the third largest building in the capital at that time, only after the Fatih mosque and Suleymaniye Mosque, testifies to Hürrem's exalted status.

The most famous of the Ottoman women's markets is the women's market established at the junction of Kocamustafapaşa Street and Yağhâne in Cerrahpaşa. According to sources, this market was first opened by Hürrem and was established on the site of Forum Arcadii in front of the Arcadius Column from the Roman period, near the Haseki Hospital and Soup Kitchen that belonged to her first complex. At the end of the 19th century, there was a pillared bazaar in Haseki Avratpazarı, smaller than Direklerarası in Şehzadebaşı, and that in 1905, the roof with the pillars was removed and the shops were given a different shape.

She built mosque complexes in Adrianopole and Ankara; waterways in Edirne; a mosque, a soup kitchen and a primary school in Svilengrad in today's Bulgaria and also repaired the Ayn Zubeyde waterways that supplied water to Mecca. She commissioned a double-bath along the ceremonial route, the Hürrem Sultan Bathhouse, to serve the community of worshippers in the nearby Hagia Sophia. Although there are some difficulties in calculating the date in the inscription in verse written by the poet with the pen name Hüdâyi, which is located above the door of the men's section, it must have been built in the year 960 (1553) since this year is given in the numerical terms. The bathhouse is described as "sultani" in its inscription, and in the anthologies reporting the works of Mimar Sinan, it is called "the late Haseki Sultan Bathhouse". Thus, this structure also known as the Hagia Sophia Bathhouse was built by Sinan for Hürrem Sultan, to provide income for her foundations. The Hagia Sophia Bath, located in a central location in Istanbul, right on the edge of Atmeydanı (Sultanahmet Square) and between the Hagia Sophia and Sultan Ahmed Mosques, was in the middle of a dense settlement until the İshak Pasha fire in 1913. Polish Count E. Raczynski, who came to Istanbul in 1814, described this bath in which he washed in his travelogue and also published its plan among the plates of his book published in 1824. The 75-meter-long structure is designed in the style of classical Ottoman baths having two separate symmetrical sections for men and women. The two sections, located in the north–south direction, are on the same axis, which was a novelty in hamam architecture. The men's section is to the north while the women's section is to the south. Besides, she had another bath constructed in the crowded commercial centre of Eminonu on the shores of the Golden Horn and a khan close to the Grand Bazaar in Istanbul.

In Jerusalem she established the Haseki Sultan Imaret in 1552, a public soup kitchen to feed the poor, which was said to have fed at least 500 people twice a day. These assets included land in Palestine and Tripoli, as well as shops, public bath houses, soap factories, and flourmills. Haseki Hürrem Sultan's endowment deed includes 195 topoynyms and 32 estates mainly along the road between Jaffa and Jerusalem. The Haseki Sultan Imaret not only fulfilled the religious requirement to give charity, but reinforced the social order and helped the Ottoman Empire project a political image of power and generosity. She built a public soup kitchen in Makkah.

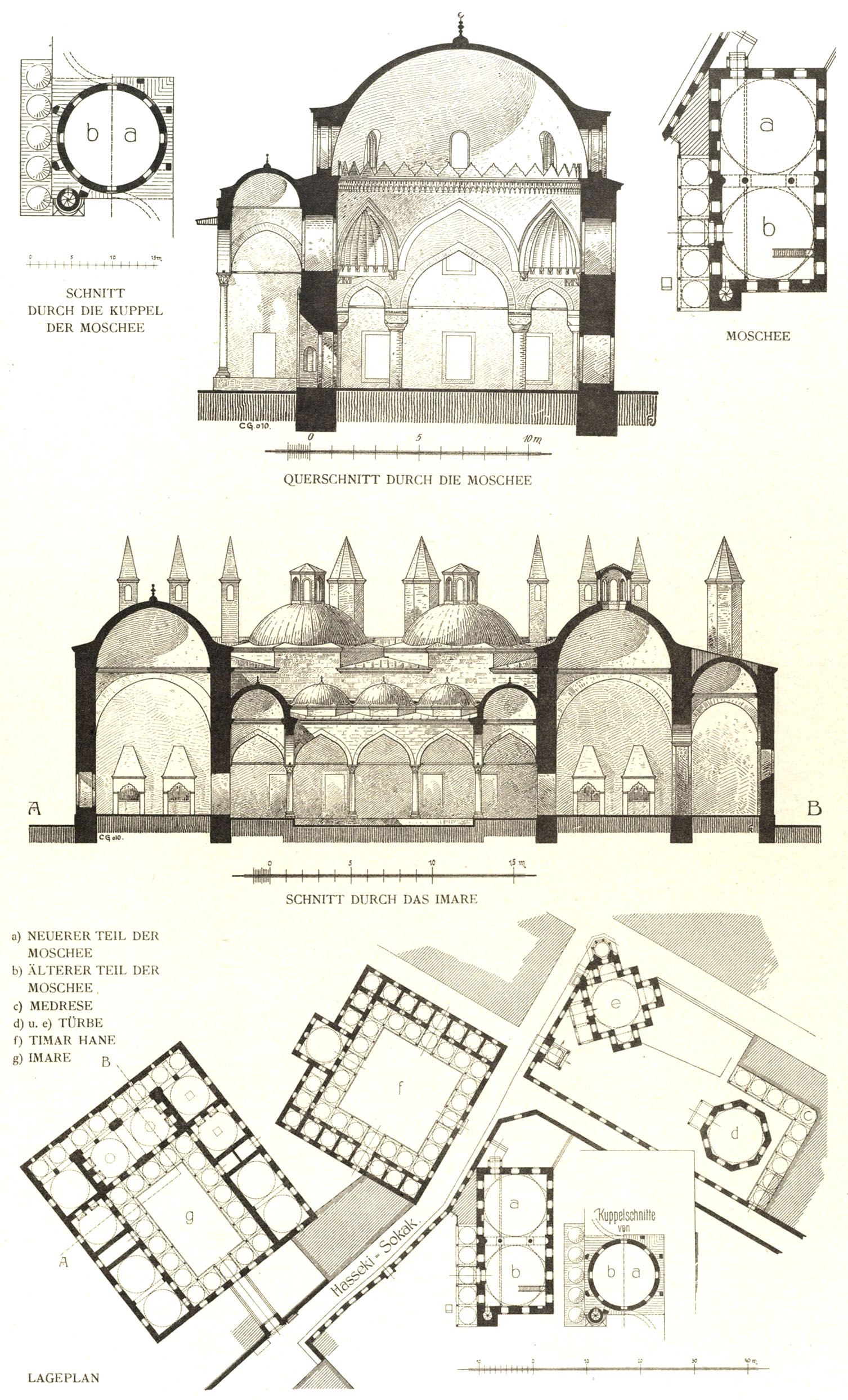
Cross-sections and plans of the Haseki Sultan Complex

In a foundation charter (Vakfiye) signed by a judge (Qādī) and witnesses, not only were the buildings concerned listed, but their long-term maintenance was also ensured. Such documented maintenance could also refer to existing foundations of her own or those of other donors. Hürrem's foundation charters from 1540 and 1551 record donations for the maintenance of long-established dervish convents in various Istanbul districts.

Sometime, probably between 1544 and 1547, on one of her many visits to the building site of the Şehzade Mosque – which was being constructed in the memory of her recently deceased son, Şehzade Mehmed and which previously housed the chambers of the elite Janissary corps – Hürrem was so moved by the plight of the novices carrying building materials with “bare head and feet” that she financed the raise of their monthly wages by herself.

She had a kira who acted as her secretary and intermediary on several occasions, although the identity of the kira is uncertain (it may have been Strongilah).

== Death ==
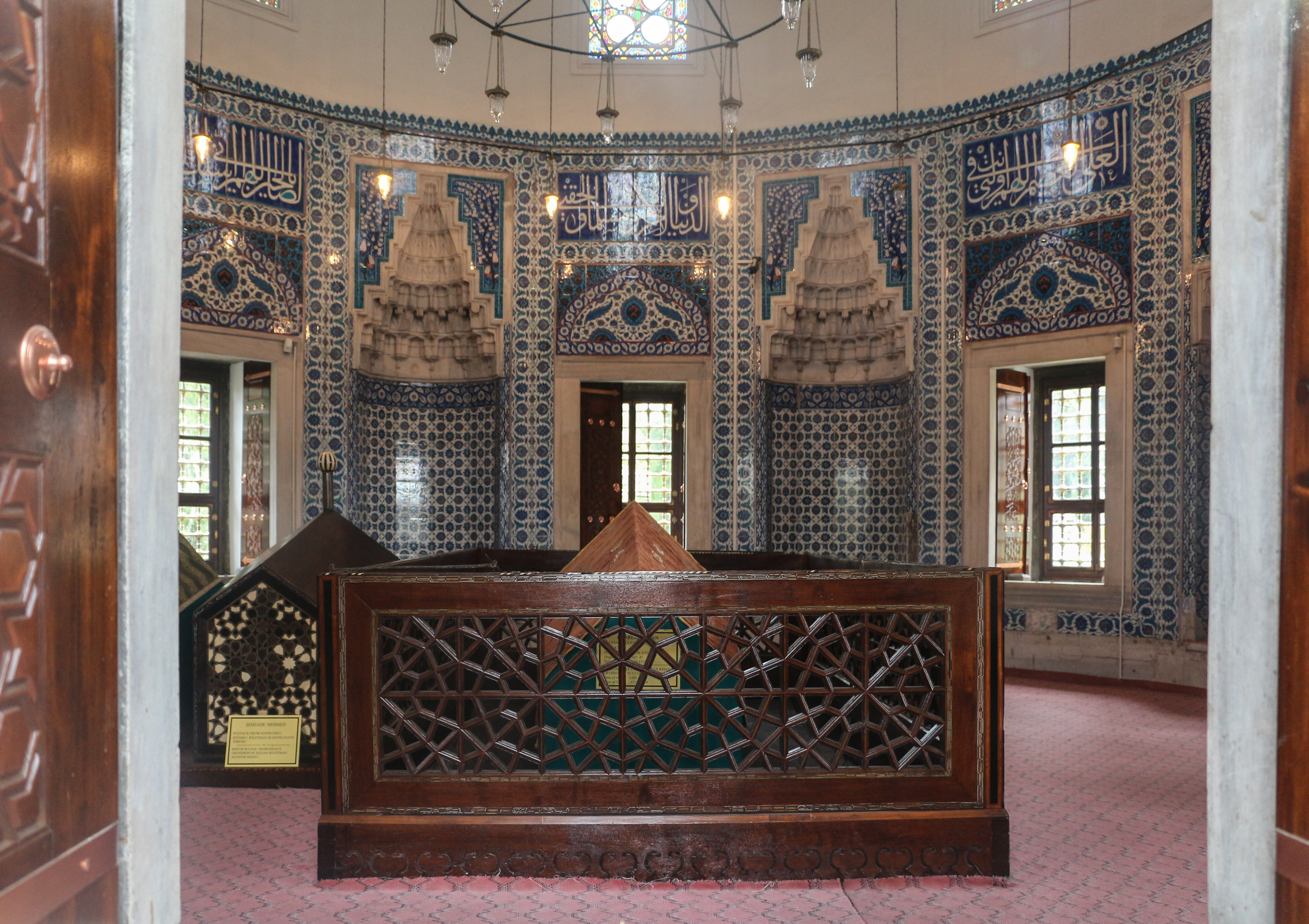
The türbe (mausoleum) of Hürrem Sultan at Süleymaniye Mosque in Fatih, Istanbul.

Hürrem died on 15 April 1558 due to an unknown illness. The French ambassador, Jean de la Vigne, wrote a letter to a colleague in which he states the ''La Assaqui'' (the Haseki) had passed early in the morning. The ambassador reported that the sultan's sorrow was so enormous that he had aged greatly. He also noted a promise that Suleiman had allegedly made to Hurrem days before her death:

"They say that the day before she died, he promised her and swore by the soul of his father Selim that he would never approach another woman".

The French ambassador remarked that the news of Hürrem's death was a big blow to the government because the majority of the statesmen were of her making. According to the ambassador, a change in the establishment was now expected to take place.

Hürrem's coffin was carried by the viziers to the mosque of Sultan Bayezid II, a journey which was almost certainly observed by hundreds of thousands of people. There funeral prayers were led by the chief mufti Ebu Suud. She was buried in a domed mausoleum (türbe) decorated in exquisite Iznik tiles depicting the garden of paradise, perhaps in homage to her smiling and joyful nature. Her mausoleum is adjacent to Suleiman's, a more somber, domed structure, at the courtyard of the Süleymaniye Mosque.

== Issue ==
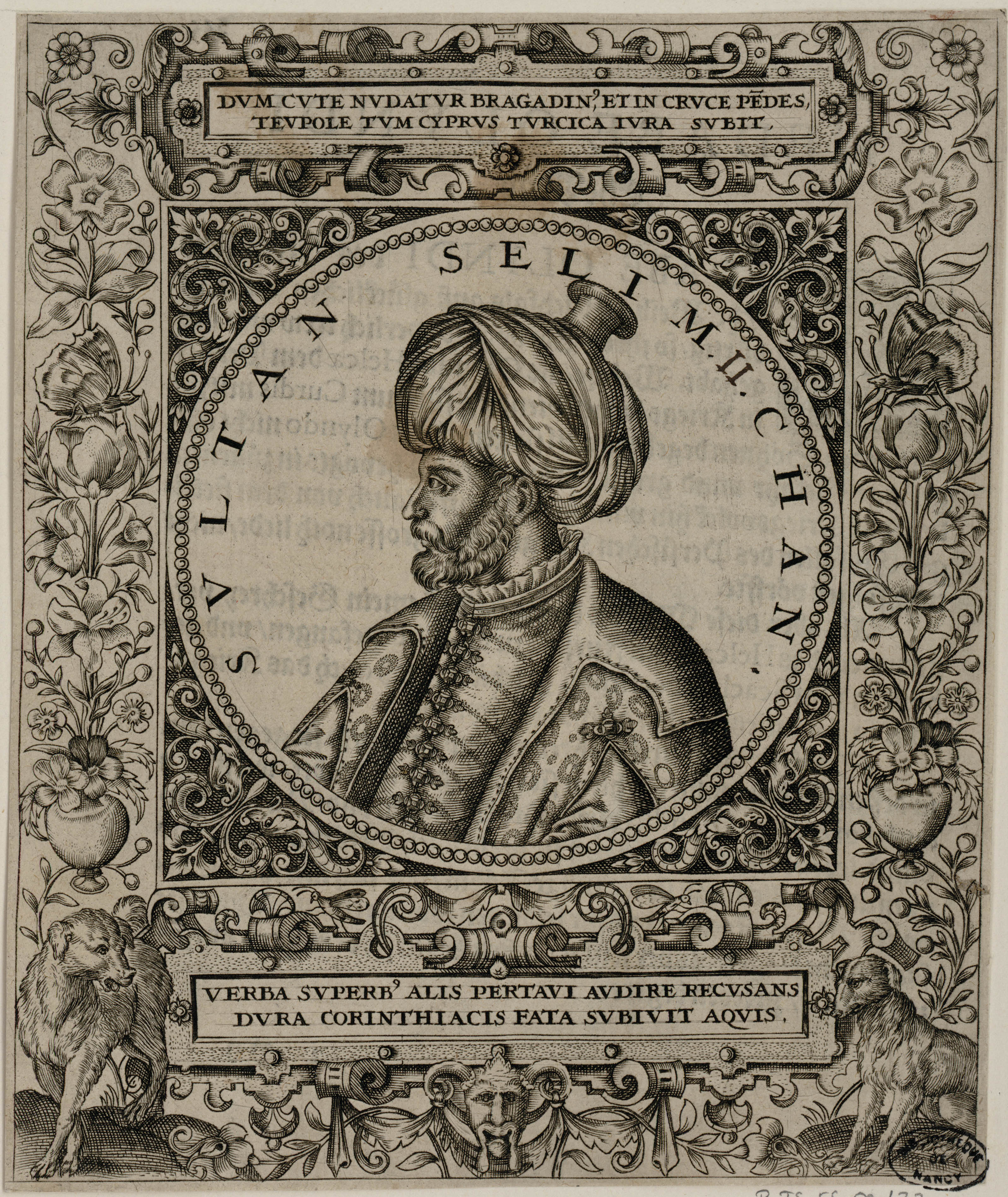
The son of Hürrem Sultan and Sultan Suleiman the Magnificent, Sultan Selim II

Hürrem was an extremely affectionate mother who was very devoted to her children. With Suleiman, Hürrem had at least six children. Due to high infant mortality rates at the time, it is plausible that few of her children had died young and were thus excluded from historical records, especially if they were daughters who were not considered as politically consequential because generally no significant political constellation could be based on the mother-daughter relationship. Even Mihrimah's existence was ignored in the oft-quoted report of 1526 by Bragadin. By 1520, Suleiman was the father of four children from different concubines (of whom only Mustafa would survive), but after he met Hürrem upon assuming his sultanate, all his children henceforth were born of Hürrem. Among her six known children were five sons and one daughter:

- Şehzade Mehmed (September 1522, Old Palace, Constantinople – 7 November 1543, Manisa Palace, Manisa, buried in Şehzade Mosque, Constantinople). Hürrem's firstborn. He became the sanjak-bey of Manisa and presumptive heir to the throne especially from 1541 until his death.
- Mihrimah Sultan (September 1522, Old Palace, Constantinople – 25 January 1578, Old Palace, Constantinople, buried in Suleiman I Mausoleum, Süleymaniye Mosque). Hürrem's only daughter, she was named "Mihrümah", i.e."Sun and Moon" in Persian, however there are other versions of this name. She used to sign herself as "Hanım Sultan". She was married to Rüstem Pasha, later Ottoman Grand Vizier, on 26 November 1539, and had a daughter and possibly a son.
- Selim II (28 May 1524, Old Palace, Constantinople – 15 December 1574, Topkapı Palace, Constantinople, buried in Selim II Mausoleum, Hagia Sophia Mosque). He was sanjak-bey of Karaman, then of Manisa after Mehmed's death and later governor of Konya and Kütahya. As Suleiman's only son that survived after him, he ascended to the throne on 30 September 1566 as Selim II.
- Şehzade Abdullah (c. 1525, Old Palace, Constantinople – c. 1528, Old Palace, Constantinople, buried in Yavuz Selim Mosque).
- Şehzade Bayezid (c. 1527, Old Palace, Constantinople – 25 September 1561, Qazvin, Safavid Empire, buried in Melik-i Acem Türbe, Sivas). He was governor of Karaman, Kütahya and later Amasya. He rebelled against his father for the throne and was, for this, executed by him, together with his sons.
- Şehzade Cihangir (c. 1531, Old Palace, Constantinople – 27 November 1553, Aleppo, buried in Şehzade Mosque, Istanbul). Born with what appears to have been a deformity of his shoulder, he was nonetheless greatly loved by his parents and became a constant companion of his father during their many trips, hunting expeditions and in the later two of Suleiman's military expeditions against the Safavids. He was assigned to the Sanjak of Haleb or Aleppo but it is claimed that his deformity may have hindered him from an assignment to govern any province.

== Appearance and personality ==
Hürrem's contemporaries described her as a woman who was strikingly good-looking, and distinguished from everyone else because of her red hair. Another contemporary described Hürrem as: "She is a blonde with big bright blue eyes and long braids. The whiteness and brightness of her body was strikingly beautiful." A traveller who met her recounted: "She had a constant smile on her most beauteous face, a slightly upturned nose and a sarcastic expression on her lips." A French account described her thusly:

There is no empire in the world more absolute than that of beauty; a woman who knows how to manage her charms can call herself truly powerful. The masters of the universe have sometimes been governed by those who had been their slaves. We have seen these kinds of prodigies under several princes who could claim immortality through the glory of their actions, and the infinite complaisance of Soliman for the superb Roxelane provides a famous example ... Roxelane was beautiful beyond words or expressions, sprightly, possessed of an adroit mind and an artful and bold vanity, she appeared before him [Soliman] and made him fall more and more in love than he ever could have been, becoming the mistress of his heart and secrets..."

Hürrem was also noted as being intelligent, intuitive, ambitious, "possessed of a crystalline laughter," grace, charm and good humour. She was known to have a pleasant personality, as well. Her love of poetry is considered one of the reasons which resonated with Suleiman, an admirer of poetry and an accomplished poet himself, who already loved and favoured her. However, Hürrem only gained a good command over written Turkish post mid-1520s, as Hürrem's early letters were written in high chancery style and in an elegant hand, i.e., most likely by a harem scribe; even then, though, she often appended personal notes in less stilted Turkish, which reflect a more personal register: "My Sultan, there's no limit to the burning anguish of separation. Now spare this miserable one and don't withhold your noble letters. When your letters are read, your servant and son Mir Mehmed and your slave and daughter Mihrümah weep and wail from missing you. Their weeping has driven me mad."

Hürrem is renowned as a munificent and charitable woman especially to the under-privileged. She built numerous mosques, madrasahs, hammams, and resting places for pilgrims travelling to the Islamic holy city of Makkah besides the abundant works built by her and in her name, the complete list of which remains unknown. One of her greatest and enduring philanthropical works was the Great Waqf of Al-Quds, a large soup kitchen in Jerusalem that fed the poor.

Historians traditionally depicted Hürrem as a manipulative and power-hungry social climber. They portrayed her career as the beginning of a “sultanate of women” in which strong imperial leadership gave way to court intrigue and debauchery. More recent historians have emphasized the intelligence and courage Hürrem demonstrated in navigating the ruthlessly competitive world of the harem.

Her unprecedented and tremendous philanthropy is in stark contrast to the traditional image in which Hürrem is portrayed as an extremely wily, manipulative and stone-hearted woman who would execute anyone who stood in her way, which consequently subjected her to much detestation. Nonetheless, over the course of time this unpopular image has somewhat shattered and she has earned greater respect, love, sympathy and admiration of the people:

She was the master of chaste women; a peerless pearl with an angelic temperament, the possessor of greatness, sterling qualities, sacred essence, altruism and exemplary virtues: a grand, glorious, exalted lady.

Bernard Bromage, a Western writer, says the following about her personality:

She reigned over the most magnificent period of the Ottoman Sultanate alongside Suleiman the Magnificent. Seeing that her husband was a world conqueror, this beautiful woman tried to prevail the crescent's dominance over the cross and reached the farthest polytheist lands.

Prominent Ukrainian writer Pavlo Zahrebelny describes Hürrem as: "... an intelligent, kind, understanding, open-hearted, candid, talented, generous, emotional and grateful woman who cares about the soul rather than the body; who is not carried away with ordinary glimmers such as money, prone to science and art; in short, a perfect woman."

== Legacy ==
Hürrem is well-known both in modern Turkey and in the West, and is the subject of many artistic works. In 1561, three years after her death, the French author Gabriel Bounin wrote a tragedy titled La Soltane. This tragedy marks the first time the Ottomans were introduced on stage in France. She has inspired paintings, musical works (including Joseph Haydn's Symphony No. 63), an opera by Denys Sichynsky, a ballet, plays, and several novels written mainly in Russian and Ukrainian, but also in English, French, German and Polish.

In early modern Spain, she appears or is alluded to in works by Quevedo and other writers as well as in a number of plays by Lope de Vega. In a play entitled The Holy League, Titian appears on stage at the Venetian Senate, and stating that he has just come from visiting the Sultan, displays his painting of Sultana Rossa or Roxelana.

In 2007, Muslims in Mariupol, a port city in Ukraine opened a mosque to honour Roxelana.

In the 2003 TV miniseries, Hürrem Sultan, she was played by Turkish actress and singer Gülben Ergen. In the 2011–2014 TV series Muhteşem Yüzyıl, Hürrem Sultan is portrayed by Turkish-German actress Meryem Uzerli from seasons one to three. For the series' last season, she is portrayed by Turkish actress Vahide Perçin. Hürrem is portrayed by Megan Gale in the 2022 movie Three Thousand Years of Longing.

In 2013, Croatian singer Severina made a song "Hurem" after national success of TV series Muhteşem Yüzyıl, which was broadcast in Croatia. As of 2024 the song has 28 million views.

In 2019, a mention of a Russian origin for Hürrem was removed from the visitor panel near her tomb at the Süleymaniye Mosque in Istanbul at the request of the Ukrainian embassy in Turkey.

== Visual tradition ==
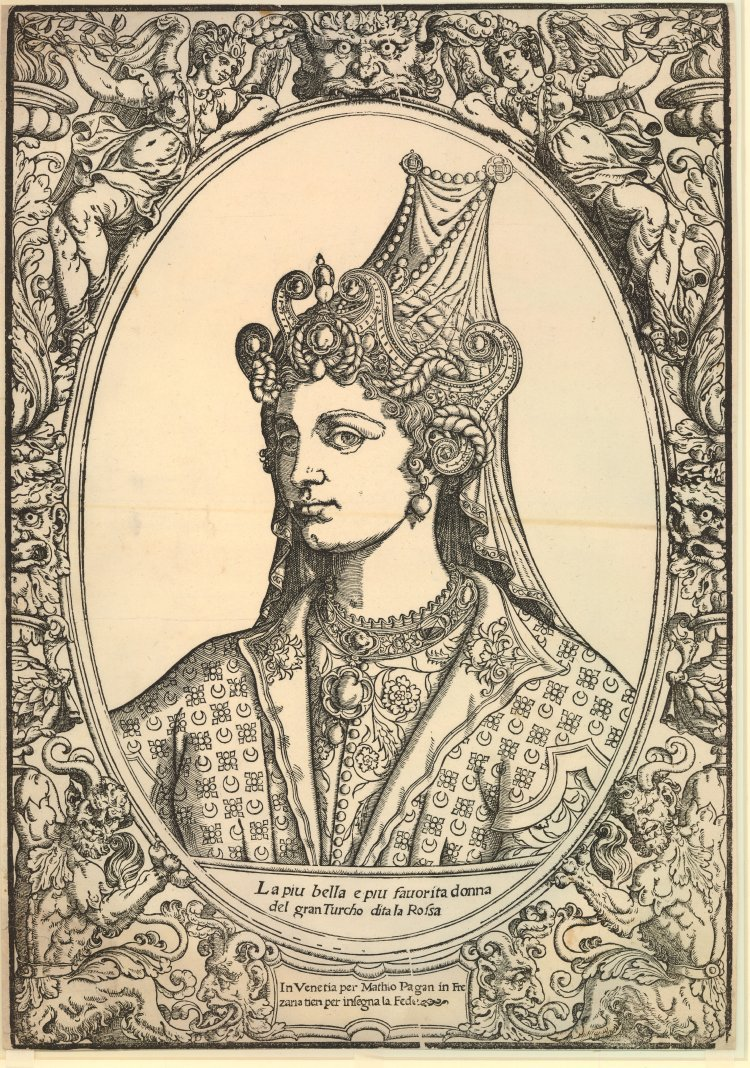
Anon., published by Matteo Pagani, Portrait of Roxelana, 1540–50. The inscription describes her as "the most beautiful and favorite wife of the Grand Turk, called la Rossa."

Although male European artists were denied access to the harem, Hürrem is the Ottoman imperial consort with the most portraits to her name. Scholars thus agree that European artists created a visual identity for Ottoman women that was largely imagined. The artists Titian, Melchior Lorich and Sebald Beham were all influential in creating a visual representation of Hürrem. Images of the chief consort emphasized her beauty and wealth, and she is almost always depicted with elaborate headwear.

The Venetian painter Titian is reputed to have painted Hürrem in 1550. Although he never visited Constantinople, he either imagined her appearance or had a sketch of her. In a letter to Philip II of Spain, the painter claims to have sent him a copy of this "Queen of Persia" in 1552. The Ringling Museum in Sarasota, Florida, purchased the original or a copy around 1930. Titian's painting of Hürrem is very similar to his portrait of her daughter, Mihrimah Sultan.

== Gallery ==
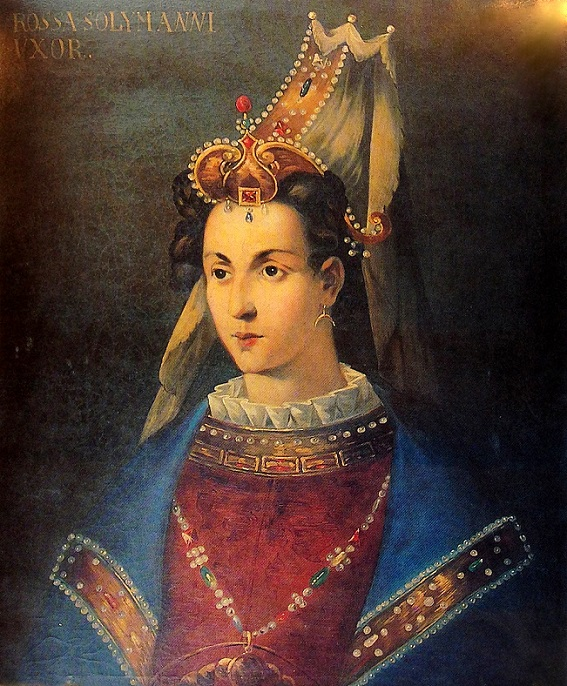
Portrait of Hürrem Sultan kept at Topkapı Palace (18th century)

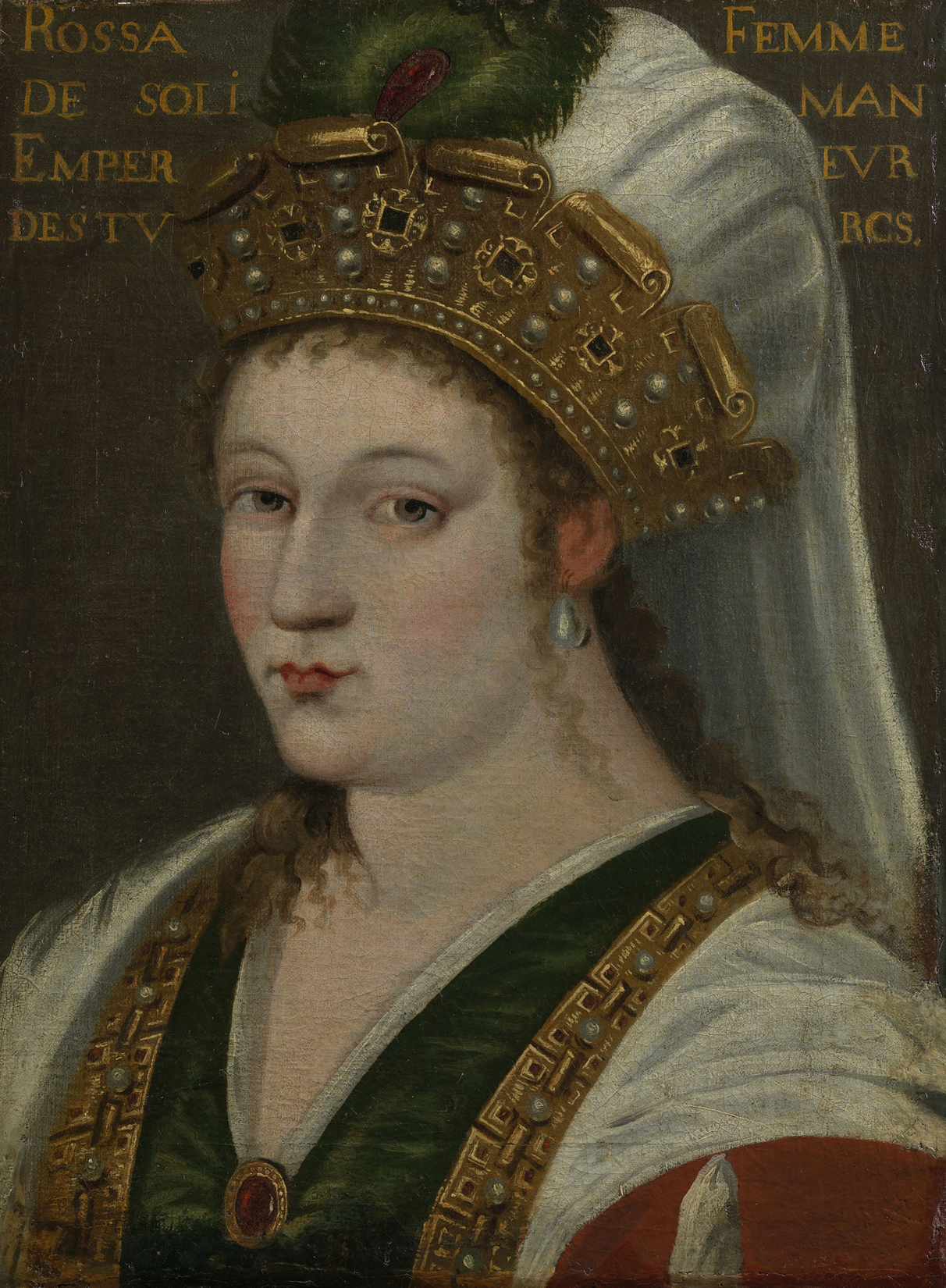
Portrait of Hürrem Sultan in the possession of the Royal Collection (c. 1600–70)

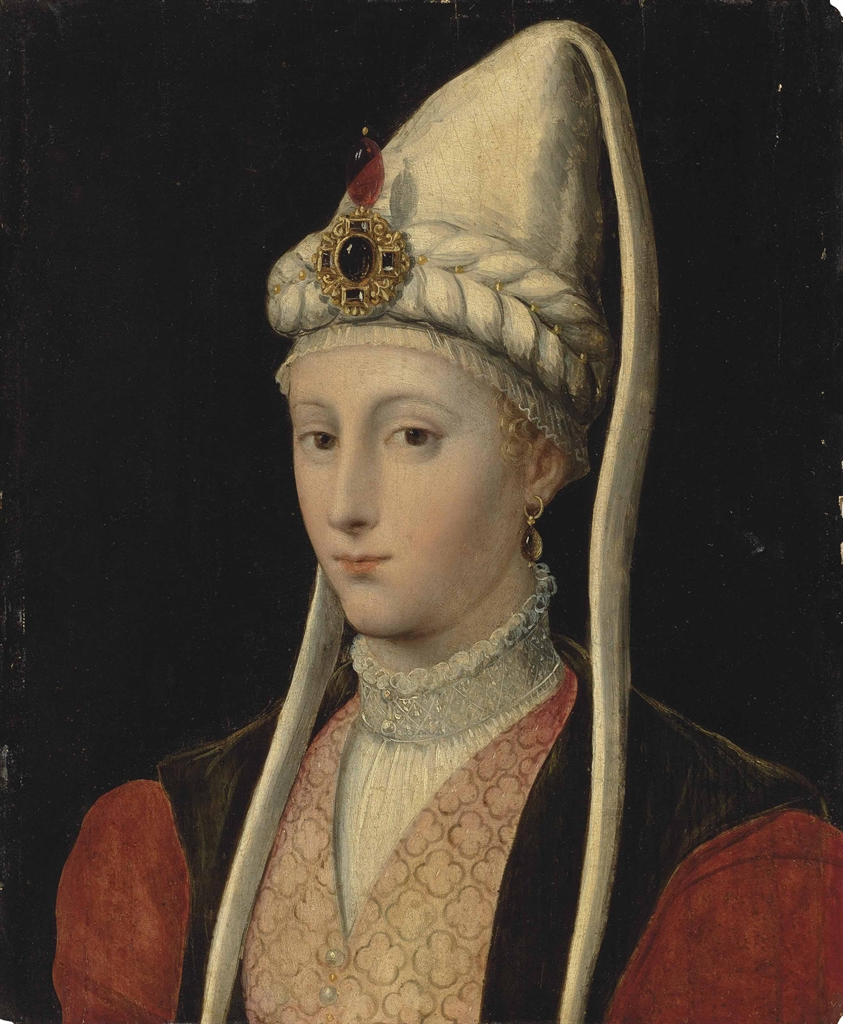
Hürrem Sultan, by a follower of Titian (16th century)

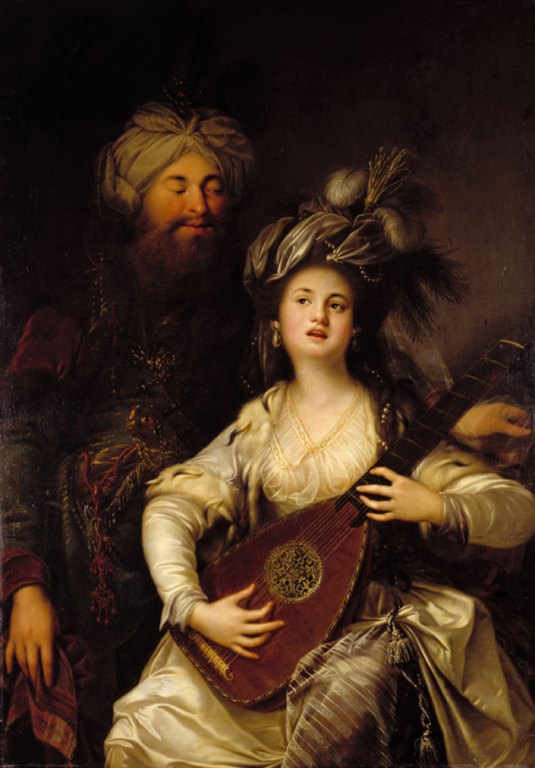
Hürrem and Suleiman the Magnificent, by German baroque painter Anton Hickel (1780)

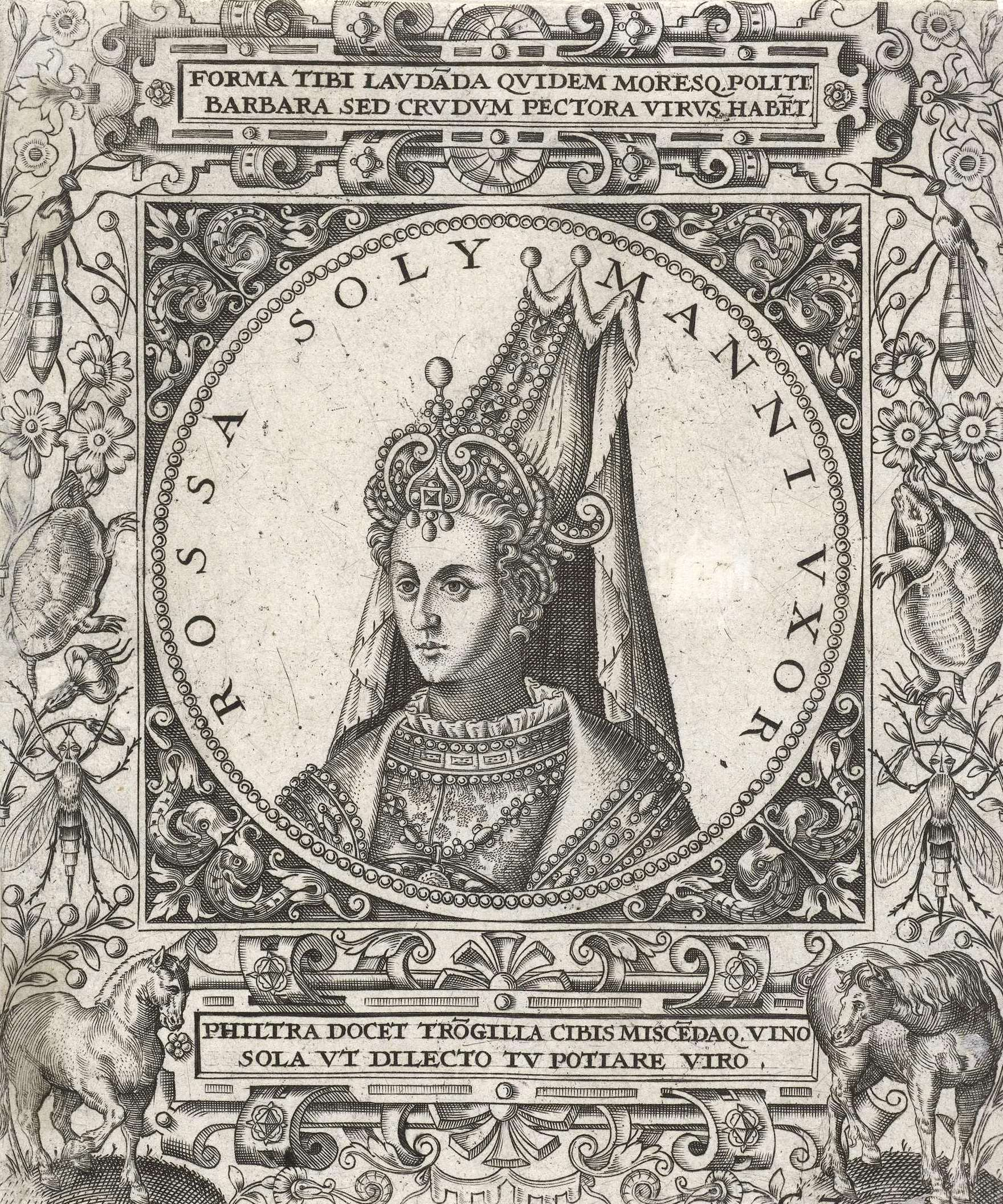
Engraving of Hürrem Sultan, by Johann Theodor de Bry (1596)

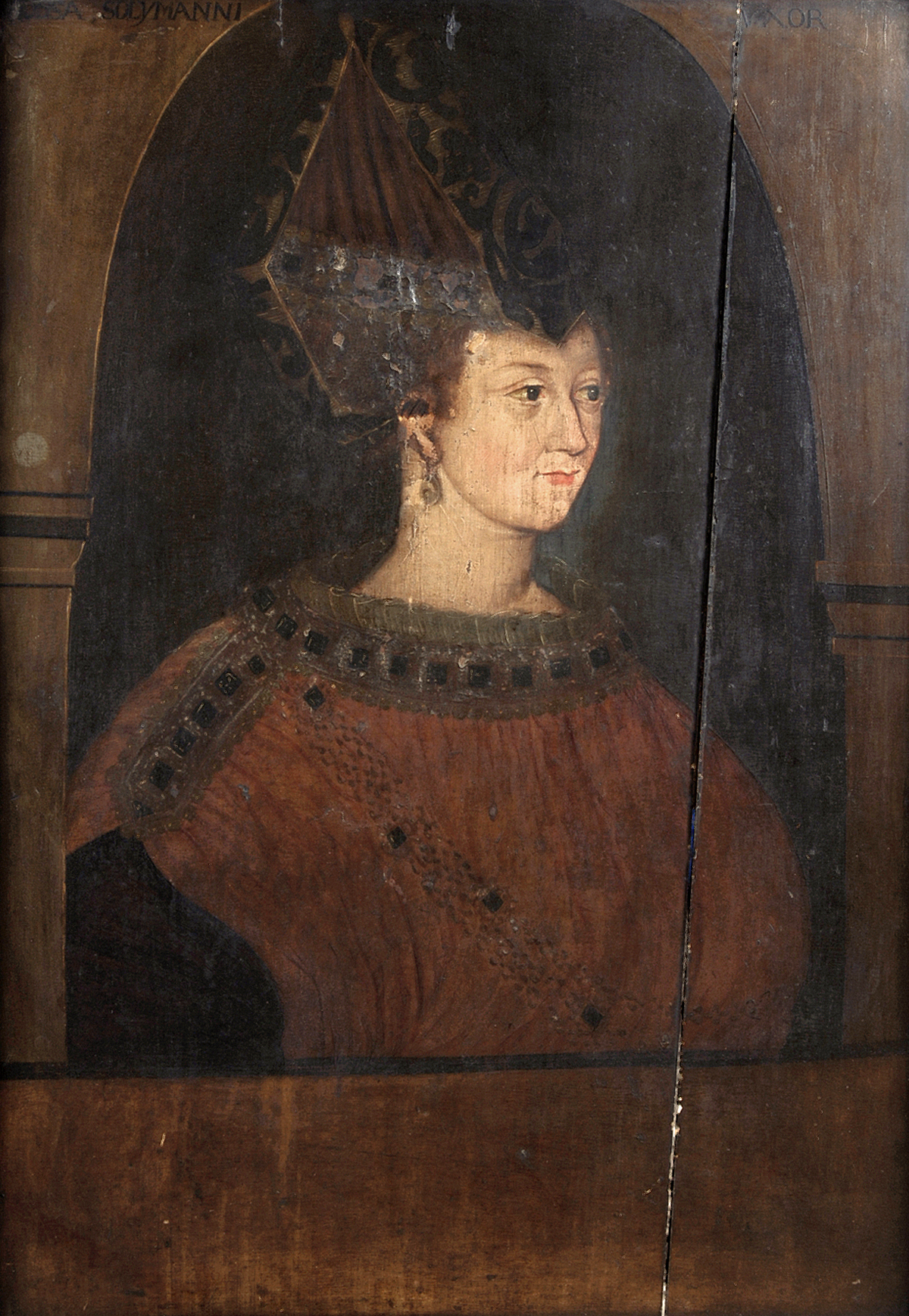
Oil on wood painting of Hürrem Sultan (16th century)

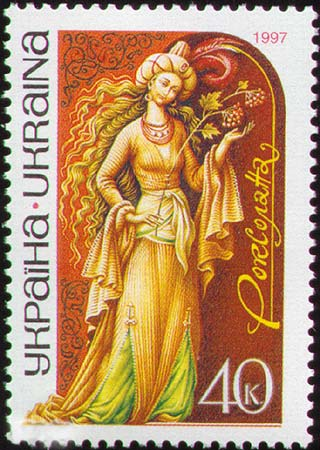
Tribute to Hürrem Sultan on a Ukrainian postage stamp in 1997

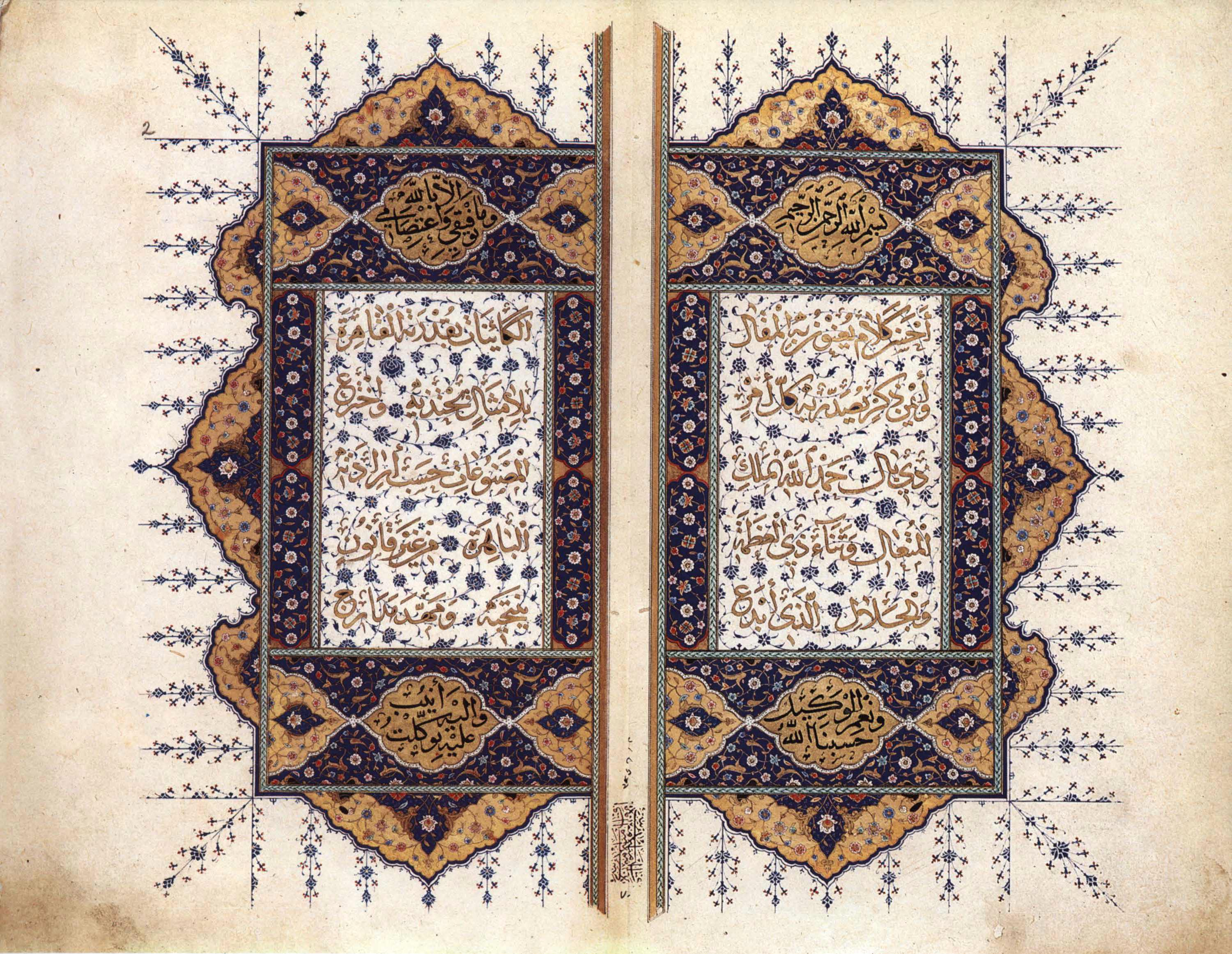
Serlevha (illuminated frontispiece) from the endowment charter (waqfiyya) pertaining to the architectural complex commissioned by Hürrem Sultan in Aksaray, Istanbul, in 1540; now at the Turkish and Islamic Arts Museum

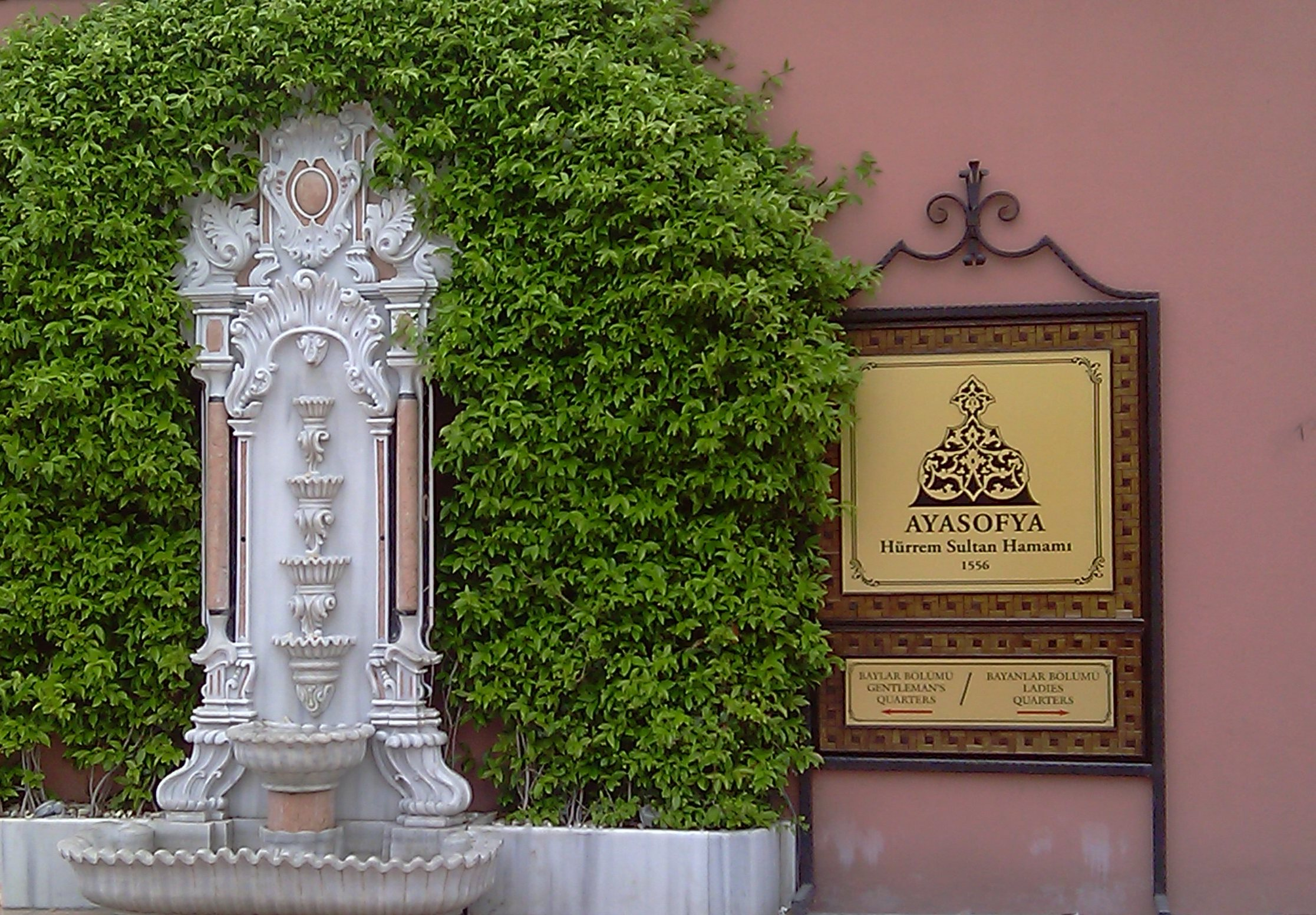
Hagia Sophia Hürrem Sultan Bathhouse, built in 1556

== In literature and popular culture ==
- The novel Roxelana și Soliman (1987) by Romanian author Vintilă Corbul is a fictionalized account of the love story between Hürrem, who is identified as Polish noblewoman Alexandra Lisowska, and Suleiman the Magnificent.
- Portrayed by Mine Manavoglu in the TV Mini Series Mimar Sinan (1988)
- Portrayed by Claudia Cardinale in the film La batalla de los Tres Reyes (1990)
- Portrayed by Olha Sumska in the Ukrainian series Roxolana (1997–2003)
- Portrayed by Gülben Ergen in the Turkish miniseries Hürrem Sultan (2003)
- Portrayed by Sólveig Arnarsdóttir in the documentary miniseries Mätressen – Die geheime Macht der Frauen (Mistresses – The Secret Power of Women) (2005)
- Portrayed by Olena Yeremenko in the Ukrainian documentary Roxolana: Bloody Path to the Throne (2008)
- Portrayed by Hülya Avşar in the documentary drama series 8 Ülke 8 Yönetmen & Sinan (2010)
- Portrayed by Meryem Uzerli and Vahide Perçin in the Turkish series Muhteşem Yüzyıl (2011–2014)
  - "Hurem", a 2013 song by Severina, was inspired by Uzerli's portrayal.
- Portrayed by Megan Gale in the film Three Thousand Years of Longing (2022)

== See also ==
- Ottoman dynasty
- Ottoman family tree
- List of mothers of the Ottoman sultans
- List of Ottoman imperial consorts
- Haseki Sultan Complex
- Hürrem Sultan Hamam
- Haseki Sultan Imaret
- Sultanate of Women

== Notes ==
Ottoman royalty
New title position established	Haseki Sultan; 1533 – 15 April 1558	Succeeded by Nurbanu Sultan
