= Hagia Sophia Hurrem Sultan Bathhouse =

Hürrem Sultan Bathhouse
- Hürrem Sultan Hamamı
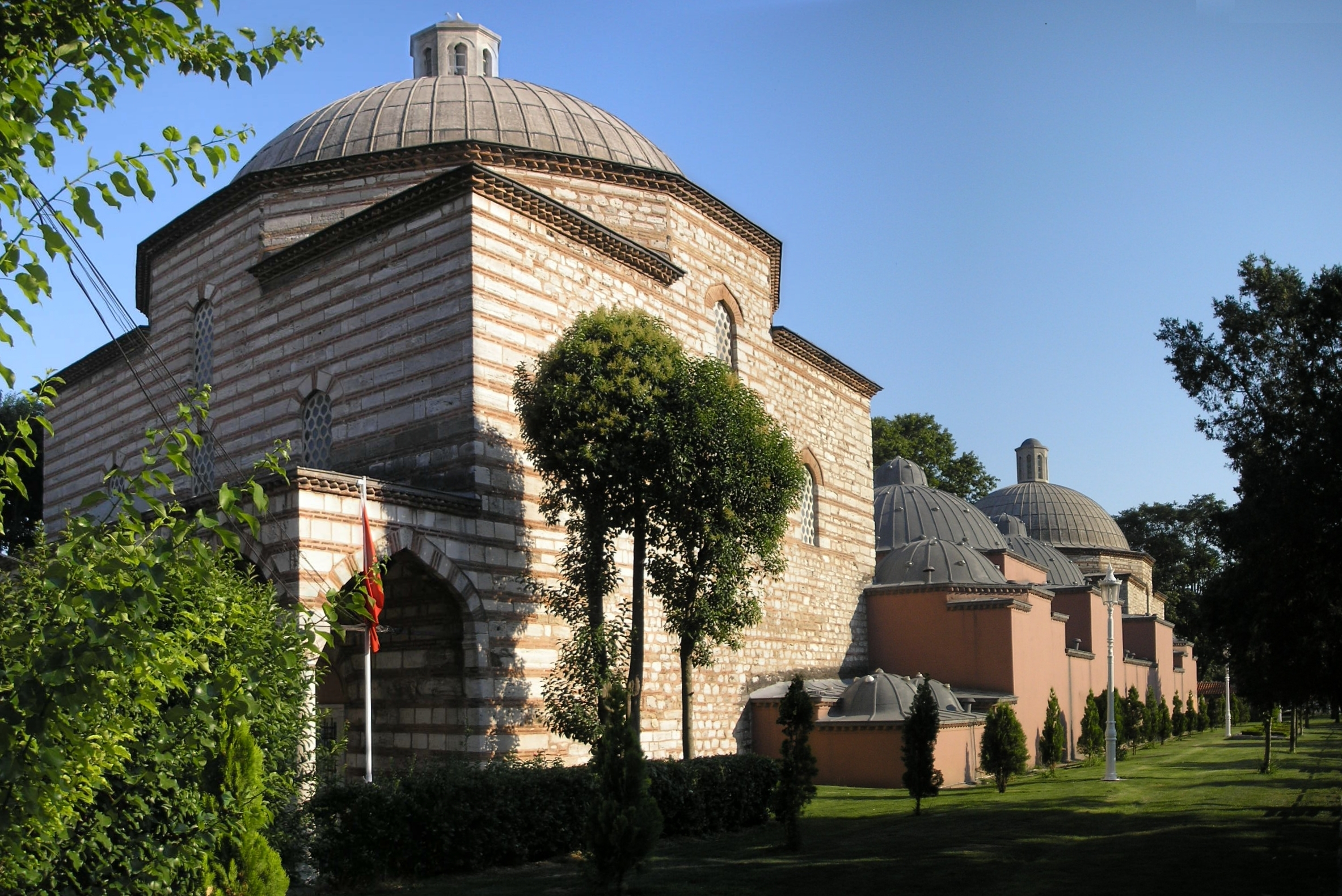
- The building in 2007
- Interactive map of the Hürrem Sultan Bathhouse area

General information
- Location: Fatih, Istanbul, Cankurtaran Mah. Ayasofya Meydanı No:2
- Coordinates: 41.00732°N 28.97928°E
- Opened: 1556
- Renovated: May 2011
- Owner: Metropolitan Municipality of Istanbul
- Operator: Haseki Tourism Group

Other information
- Facilities: Steam bath, peeling and soap massage

Website
- www.hurremsultanhamami.com/en/

The Hagia Sophia Hürrem Sultan Bathhouse (Turkish: Ayasofya Hürrem Sultan Hamamı, aka Hagia Sophia Haseki Bathhouse (Ayasofya Haseki Hamamı) and Haseki Hürrem Sultan Bathhouse (Haseki Hürrem Sultan Hamamı)) is a sixteenth-century hammam (Turkish bathhouse) in Istanbul, Turkey. It was commissioned by Hürrem Sultan (also known as Roxelana), consort and wife of the Ottoman sultan Süleyman the Magnificent. It was designed by Mimar Sinan on the site of the historical Baths of Zeuxippus for the religious community of the nearby Hagia Sophia.

== Architecture ==
The public bathhouse was constructed as a charitable project by architect Mimar Sinan in 1556. The 75 m (246 ft) long structure is designed in the style of classical Ottoman baths, having two symmetrical separate sections for males and females. Both sections, situated in a north–south direction, are on the same axis that was a novelty in Turkish bathhouse architecture. The men's section is to the north, while the women's section is to the south.

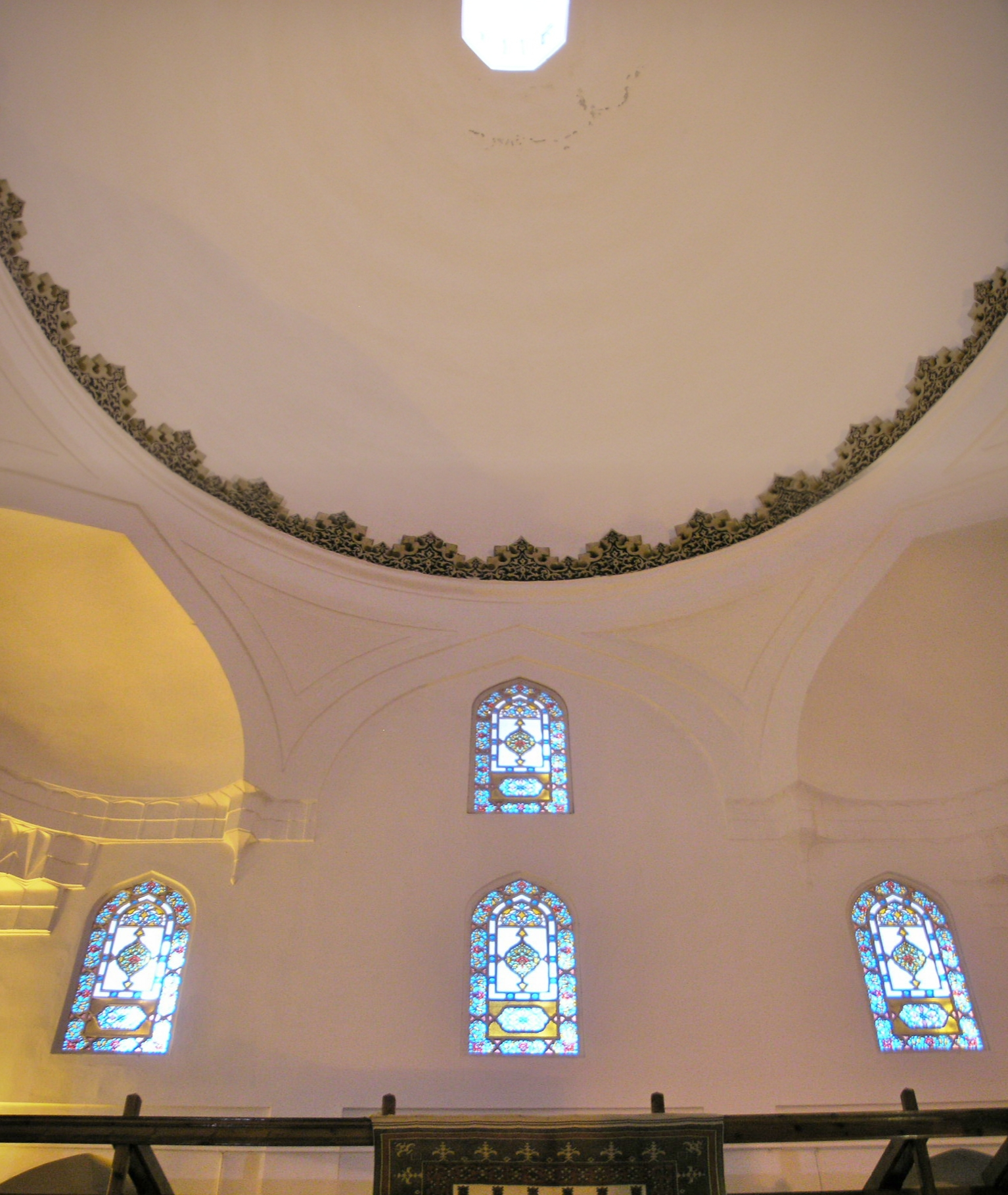
Pointed-arch stained-glass windows of the men's changing room

The exterior walls are built in courses of one cut stone and two bricks. The changing room of the men's section has four pointed-arch stained-glass windows above in the facade while the women's changing room has three windows.

The entrance to the men's section is in the north and the women's in the west. Unlike in the architecture of other Turkish bathhouses, there is a stoa with a dome in the center of the men's section's front side. The roofs of the dome and the stoa are decorated with bricks, and covered by lead sheeting. A red and a white palmette with a golden epigraph on green ground ornament the pointed arch of the monumental entrance door.

Each section consists of three basic, interconnected rooms, namely the changing room (soyunmalık), the intermediate cool room (soğukluk, frigidarium) and the hot room (sıcaklık, caldarium). The hot rooms of the two sections are adjacent while the changing rooms are situated at both ends of the axis. The sequence of the rooms proceeds through the changing room, cool room and hot room of the men's section, followed by the hot room, cool room and the changing room of the women's section.

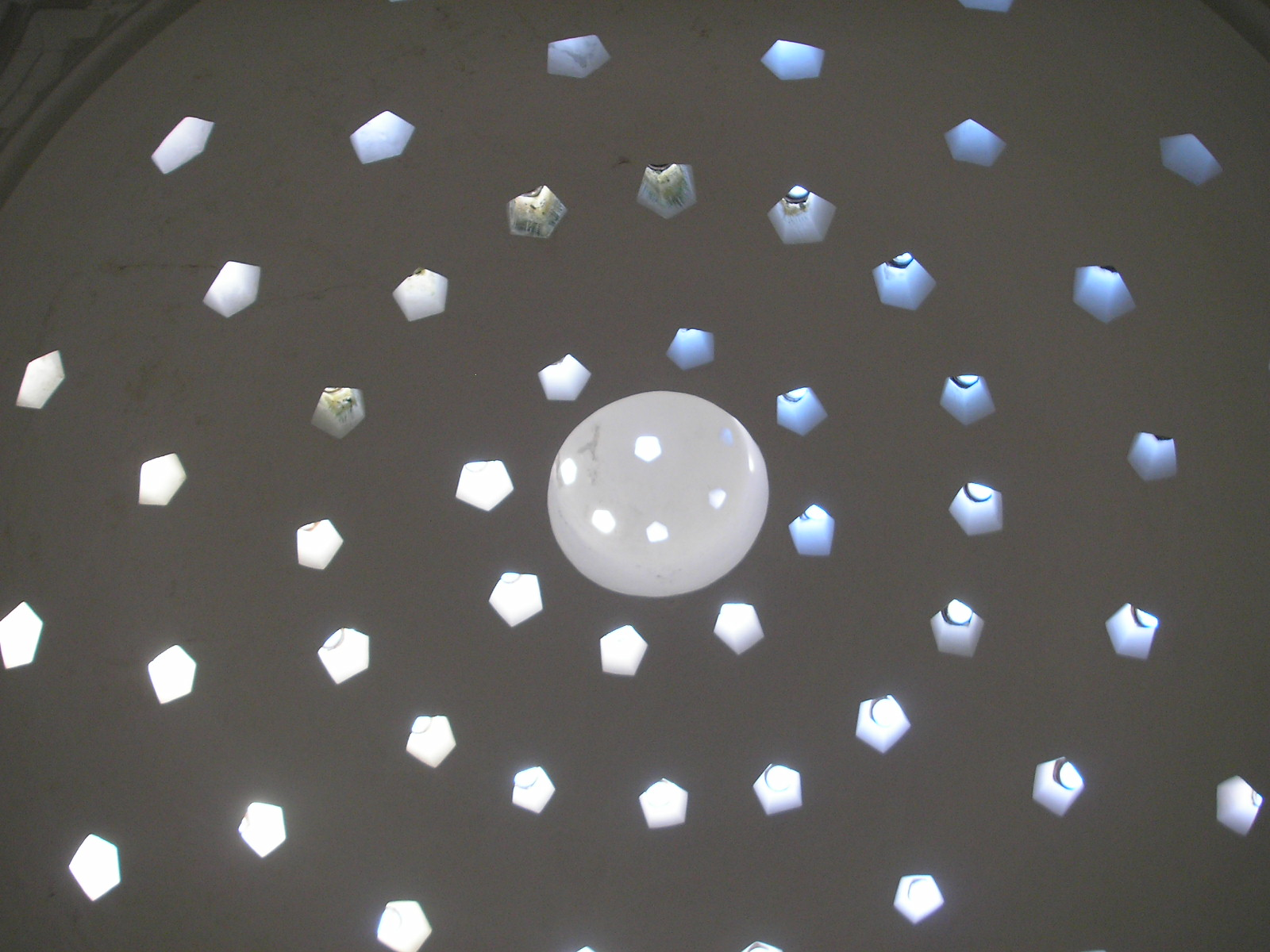
Dome of the men's hot room

The men's changing room is rectangular and covered with a dome, which is surrounded by a frieze of zigzag-shaped leaves in the ablaq decorative technique. There are pointed-arch niches on each side of the room. There are toilets, roofed with three domes, on one side of the cool room, with a shaving room on the other side A door leads into the cross-shaped hot room, which has four loggias with fountains in the corners, and four self-contained cubicles for privacy (halvet) under a small dome. In the centre of the hot room is a large octagonal marble table called a göbektaşı (literally: navel stone), which bathers can lie on. It was formerly decorated with mosaics. The large dome of the hot room, which sits on the octagonal-shaped walls, has small glass windows to create a half-light from the top. The women's section has the same architectural plan as the men's side, although its changing room is slightly smaller.

== Restoration ==
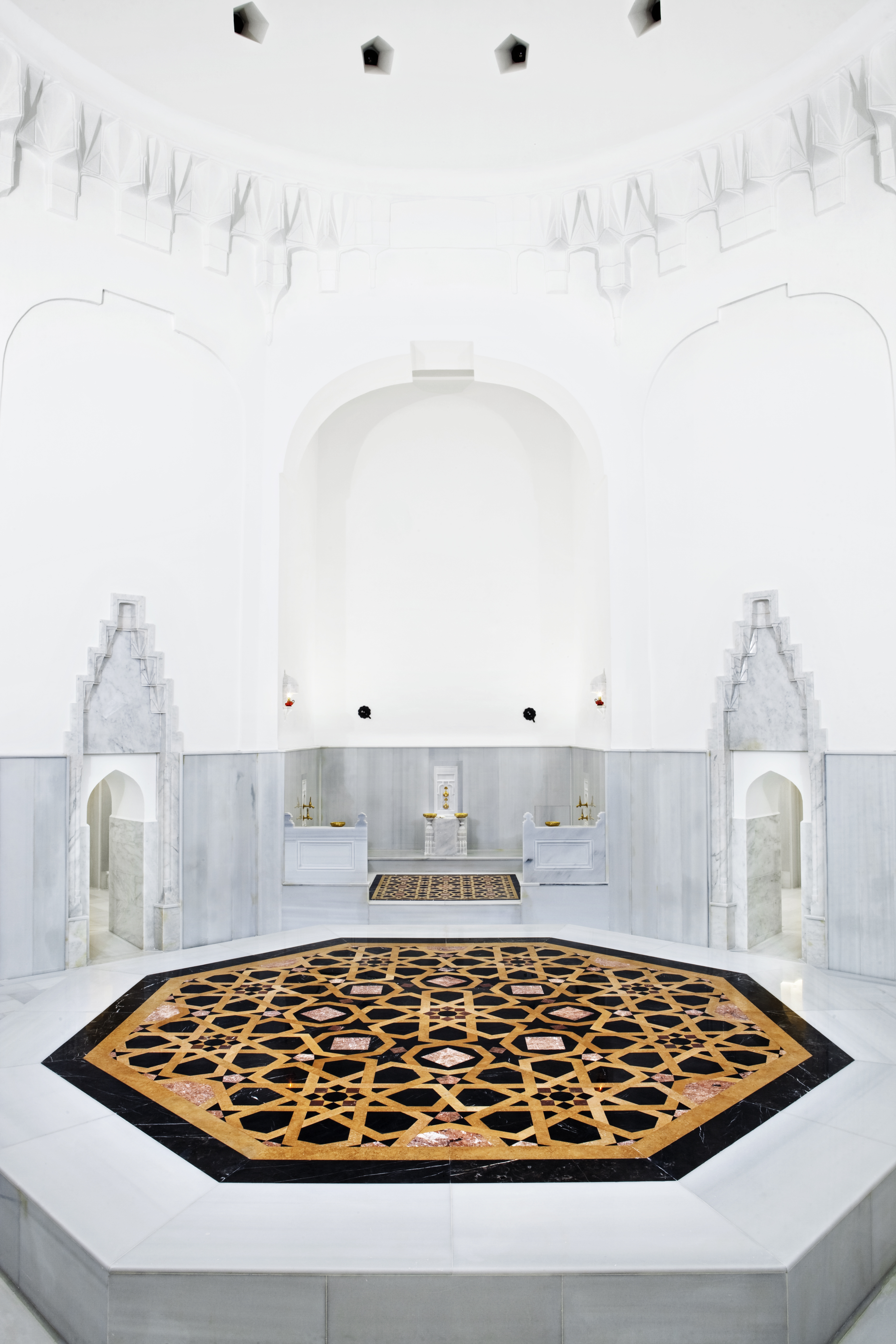
Interior of Hagia Sophia Hurrem Sultan Hamam in 21st Century

The building was closed for a long time, then was used as a warehouse before undergoing restoration in 1957–1958. For many years it served as a government-run carpet showroom.

In 2007, Istanbul city authorities decided to return the hamam to its original use after a 105-year hiatus and a tourism development group won the tender for its restoration. After a three-year-long restoration project that began in 2008 and cost US$11 million, the bathhouse reopened in May 2011. It is now operated by Haseki Tourism Group.

== Literature ==
- Yılmazkaya, Orhan (2005). Turkish Baths: A Light onto a Tradition and Culture. Istanbul: Çitlembik Publications. ISBN 978-9756663806.
- Kocaeli University Faculty of Architecture In 2008-2011 Instructor Re-Bath of Architects Tevfik İlter Executed For Use Hamam (Bath)
