= Şehzade Abdullah (son of Suleiman the Magnificent) =

Ottoman prince (c.1525–1528)

- Born: c. 1525; Constantinople, Ottoman Empire
- Died: c. 1528 (aged 2–3); Constantinople, Ottoman Empire
- Burial: Yavuz Selim Mosque, Istanbul
Names
- Abdullah bin Suleiman
- Dynasty: Ottoman
- Father: Suleiman I
- Mother: Hürrem Sultan
- Religion: Sunni Islam

Şehzade Abdullah (c. 1525 – c. 1528) was an Ottoman prince, son of Ottoman Sultan Suleiman the Magnificent and his favorite Hürrem Sultan. He was born around 1525 in Eski Saray, the Ottoman Empire and died due to a disease, possibly smallpox, in Constantinople, around 1528. He was buried in the Yavuz Selim Mosque

Current historians believe he was not Mihrimah Sultan's twin as she was likely born in late 1522.
