= Leslie P. Peirce =

American professor in history

Leslie P. Peirce is an American professor in history. Her research interests include early modern history of the Ottoman Empire, gender, law, and society.

== Education ==
She received her B.A. in History from Harvard College, her M.A. in Middle Eastern Studies from Harvard University, and her Ph.D. (1988) in Near Eastern Studies from Princeton University.

== Career ==
In 1988–1998 she was with the Cornell University. In 1998–2006 she was professor in the Departments of History and Near Eastern Studies the University of California, Berkeley. Since 2006 she is with Department of History and the Department of Middle Eastern and Islamic Studies of the New York University, where she is the Silver Professor of History.

== Bibliography ==
- 1993: The Imperial Harem: Women and Sovereignty in the Ottoman Empire, Oxford University Press, ISBN 978-0-195-08677-5.
  - Köprülü Prize of the Turkish Studies Association for best book, 1993–1994.
  - Turkish edition: Osmanlı İmparatorluğunda Hukümranlık ve Kadınlar (Istanbul, 1996).
- 2003: Morality Tales: Law and Gender in the Ottoman Court of Aintab, University of California Press, ISBN 978-0-520-22892-4. (book review)
  - Albert Hourani Book Award, 2004; Köprülü Prize of the Turkish Studies Association for best book, 2002–2003.
  - Turkish edition: Ahlâk Oyunları (Istanbul, 2005).
- 2017: Empress of the East: How a European Slave Girl Became Queen of the Ottoman Empire, Basic Books, ISBN 978-0-465-03251-8. (book review)
- 2021: A Spectrum of Unfreedom: Captives and Slaves in the Ottoman Empire, Central European University Press, ISBN 9789-6-3-386400-5.
