= Şehzade Bayezid =

Ottoman prince (1527–1561)

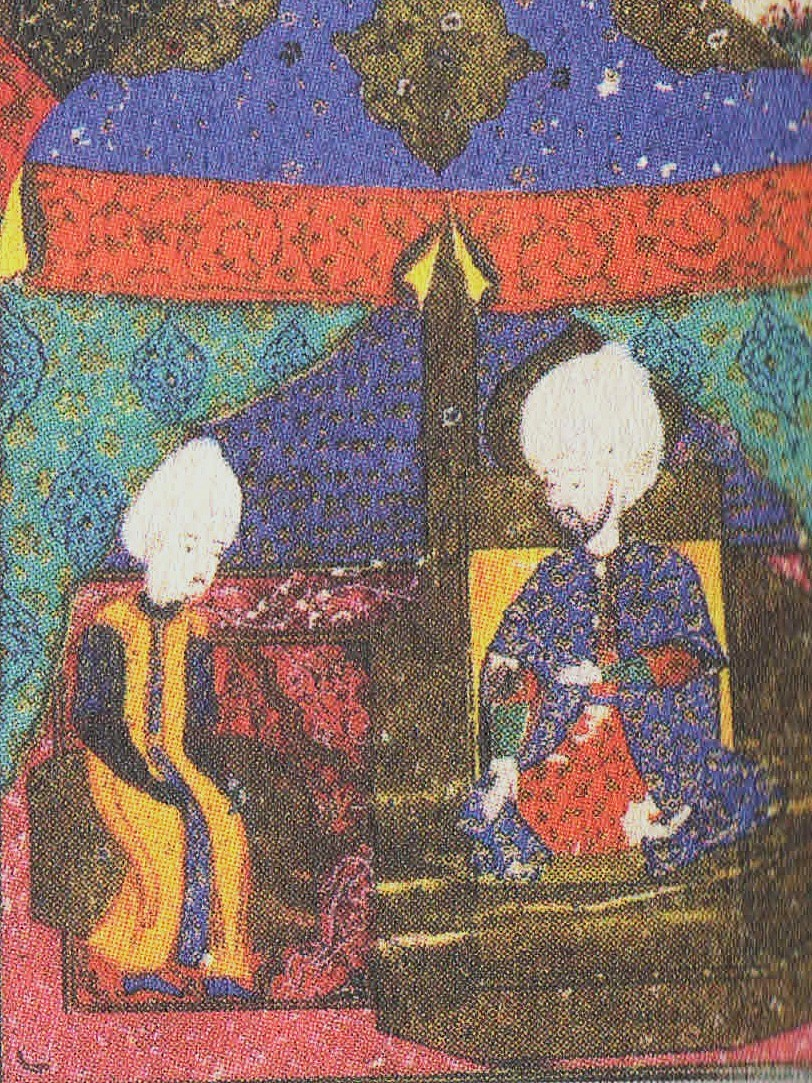
- An Ottoman miniature showing Bayezid (left) with his father Suleiman I

Governor of Amasya
- Tenure: 1558 – 1559

Governor of Kütahya
- Tenure: 1555 – 1558

Governor of Karaman
- Tenure: 1544 – 1555
- Born: 1527; Topkapı Palace, Istanbul, Ottoman Empire
- Died: 25 September 1561 (aged 33–34); Qazvin, Safavid Empire
- Burial: Melik-i Acem Türbe, Sivas
- Issue: Şehzade Orhan; Şehzade Osman; Mihrimah Sultan; Şehzade Abdullah; Hatice Sultan; Şehzade Mahmud; Ayşe Sultan; Hanzade Sultan; Şehzade Mehmed; Şehzade Murad; Şehzade Süleyman
- Dynasty: Ottoman
- Father: Suleiman the Magnificent
- Mother: Hürrem Sultan
- Religion: Sunni Islam

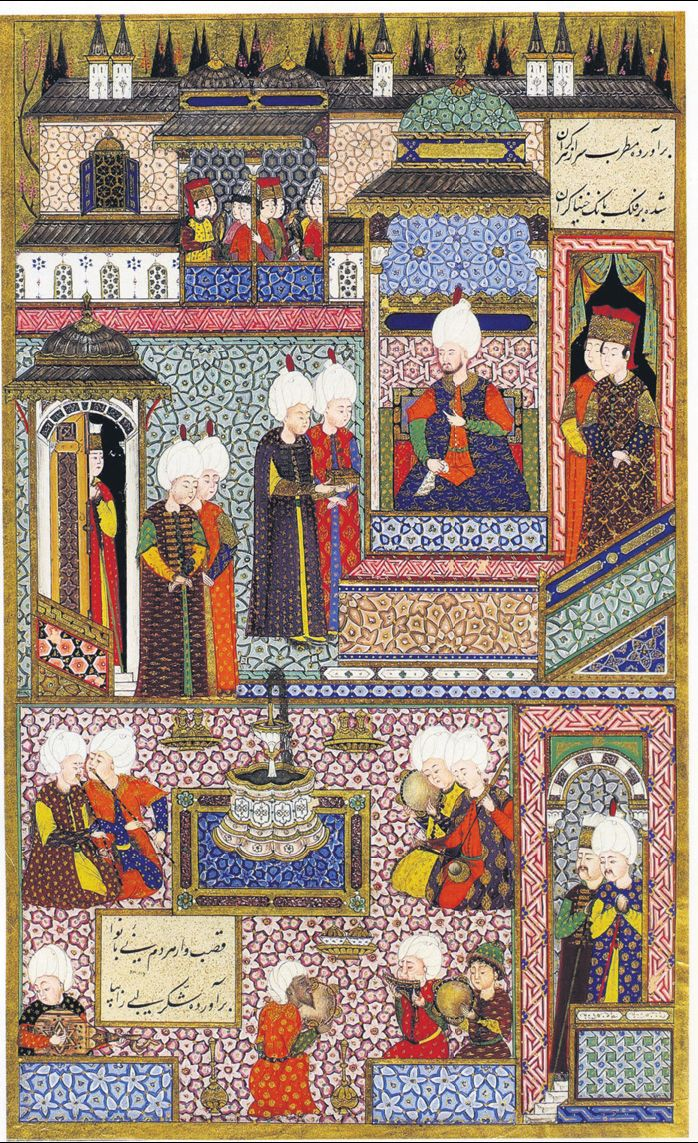
Bayezid's circumcision, 1539

Şehzade Bayezid (Ottoman Turkish: شهزاده بايزيد; 1527 – 25 September 1561) was an Ottoman prince and the son of Sultan Suleiman the Magnificent and Hürrem Sultan.

== Early years ==
Bayezid was born in 1527 in İstanbul during the reign of his father, Suleiman the Magnificent. His mother was Hürrem Sultan, an Orthodox priest's daughter, who was the current Sultan's concubine at the time. In 1533 or 1534, his mother, Hürrem, was freed and became Suleiman's legal wife. He had four brothers, Şehzade Mehmed, Şehzade Selim (future Selim II), Şehzade Abdullah and Şehzade Cihangir, and a sister Mihrimah Sultan. Between 26 November and 8 December 1539, a ceremony was held celebrating the circumcision of Bayezid and his younger brother Cihangir. The entire city and palace were involved in the elaborate event. Representatives from Ferdinand I, the French, and the Venetians were present. The joyous atmosphere included participation from viziers, governors-general, district governors, palace members, janissaries, scholars, and city residents. The occasion also marked the wedding of their sister Mihrimah and Rüstem Pasha.

In 1543, Bayezid accompanied his father to the Hungarian campaign. In 1544, he was appointed as the governor of the district of Karaman, after which he went to Konya. In 1548–49, he came to Aleppo to spend several months in Suleiman's company and its vicinity. In 1553, Suleiman went into war against the Safavid Empire. Cihangir accompanied their father. Bayezid, who was in Konya, arrived on 8 September, and was sent to watch the European front. During this war, on 6 October, his elder half-brother Şehzade Mustafa was strangled on their father's orders. He wrote poems under the pen name Şahi.

== Mustafa the imposter incident ==
In the early months of 1555, a rebellion erupted in present-day northeastern Bulgaria, where a man derisively dubbed Mustafa the Impostor in Ottoman sources led the uprising. The rebel leader claimed to be Şehzade Mustafa, asserting that he had escaped Suleiman's army camp. Organizing his followers akin to Ottoman administration, he appointed a chief vizier and military judges, emulating princely structures. Reports suggest that the pretender and his followers redistributed collected taxes, garnering support, with their numbers swelling from ten thousand to around forty thousand. As the rebellion expanded, Bayezid, informed by developments, took the first steps, making military preparations and initiating secret negotiations through a district governor. In June–July 1555, Suleiman dispatched Sokollu Mehmed Pasha, with household troops and janissaries to suppress the uprising. Simultaneously, Bayezid's envoy convinced the pretender's chief vizier to defect, leading to the pretender's capture. The imposter was transported to İstanbul, where he faced torture and execution on 31 July 1555.

The pretender's uprising, as chronicled during Ogier Ghiselin de Busbecq's stay in İstanbul, triggered speculations suggesting that Bayezid might have orchestrated the revolt with aspirations to ascend the throne during Suleiman's absence. Suleiman wanted to punish Bayezid, however, he was prevented by his wife Hürrem. While rumors of secret meetings involving Suleiman, Bayezid, and Hürrem circulated, Venetian diplomat Antonio Erizzo's similar accounts affirmed Bayezid's strong desire for the throne. Despite suppressing the pretender's revolt offering temporary relief, tensions related to succession resurfaced. Bayezid and Selim, each cultivating distinct personas, engaged in a growing rivalry, highlighting Bayezid's portrayal as heroic, generous, and just. Suleiman, aiming for fairness or influenced by Bayezid's supporters, tactically relocated him to the Germiyan district, Kütahya, echoing Selim's distance from İstanbul in Manisa. This strategic maneuver maintained an equilibrium in their positions as both princes remained poised to return to the capital upon news of their father's fate.

== Succession struggle ==
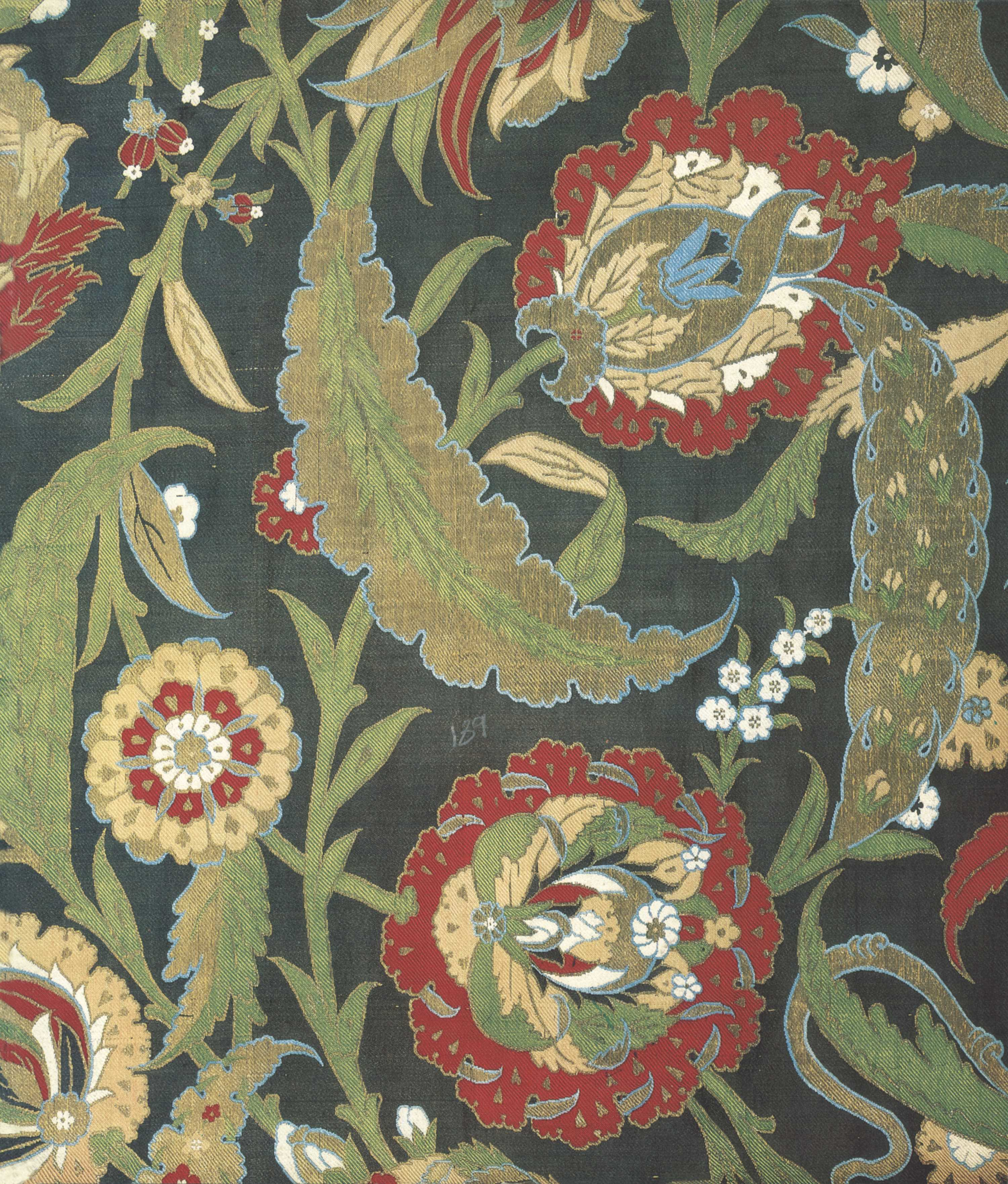
Detail from a kemha ceremonial kaftan with saz pattern made for Şehzade Bayezid. Topkapı Palace Museum

Suleiman's persistent health concerns prompted efforts to dispel rumors of imminent death. In June 1557, the French ambassador noted Suleiman's strategic display of vitality upon returning to İstanbul, countering speculations about succession plans. The dynamics shifted decisively after Hürrem's death in April 1558, known for mediating between her sons. Suleiman aimed to secure the cooperation of his sons, Selim and Bayezid, in a plan to reassign them to new, distant governorates. The proposal involved moving Selim from Manisa to Konya and relocating Bayezid from Kütahya to the remote town of Amasya. To encourage Bayezid's compliance, Suleiman offered a substantial enhancement of 300,000 aspers to his annual stipend. Both brothers' sons were also granted governorships in smaller counties adjacent to their fathers' assignments. Despite initial reluctance from Bayezid, efforts to ease tensions included offering positions to Bayezid's family members and household, aiming to defuse hostility and mistrust.

In September, Suleiman reassigned his sons, sending Selim to Konya and Bayezid to Amasya. Letters ensued, with Bayezid expressing discontent and seeking new appointments. Suleiman adopted a firmer tone, warning Bayezid against defying paternal orders at his own risk. Bayezid, unsuccessful in convincing his father to reconsider, departed Kütahya in late October and arrived in Amasya in December. Expressing impatience and emotional distress in his letters, Bayezid accused his brother Selim of intrigue and misconduct. His correspondence criticised Suleiman for perceived cruelty and lack of affection. Bayezid's reluctance to comply with the move and his appeals to Rüstem and Mihrimah might have influenced Suleiman's favour towards Selim. Bayezid's continued complaints and requests for reassignment escalated even after reaching Amasya, signaling a growing intention for armed conflict, presented as self-defense. The inevitability of confrontation loomed closer in the last months of 1558.

== Battle with Selim ==
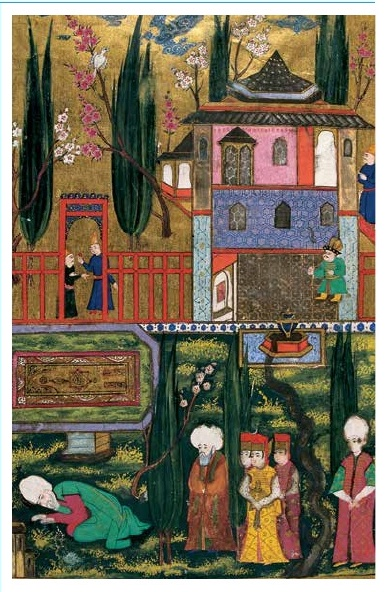
An Ottoman miniature showing Suleiman cursing Bayezid

In mid-April 1559, Bayezid and his army departed Amasya and advanced toward Ankara. Despite conveying to his father his desire to return to Kütahya, it became evident that his true intention was to attack and eliminate Selim, aiming to be the sole heir to the throne before Suleiman sided with Selim. Upon learning of Bayezid's expedition, Suleiman deemed military action necessary, instructing the third vizier Sokollu Mehmed to join Selim with janissaries, accompanied by Rumeli troops. Suleiman also sought secured legal opinions (fatwas) from the religious establishment, declaring it lawful under Sharia to combat a prince who amassed soldiers, collected funds, and committed violent acts.

Before İstanbul's forces reached Konya, Bayezid altered course southward from Ankara, arriving near Konya by late May 1559. Selim, anticipating the attack, assumed a defensive stance with augmented forces, ultimately prevailing in the engagement on May 30 and 31. Exhausted and defeated, Bayezid retreated to Amasya, seeking pardon from his father and the grand vizier Rüstem, while simultaneously attempting to regroup. Selim, aided by Sokollu Mehmed's forces, pursued Bayezid, prompting a comprehensive mobilization against Bayezid across the Ottoman state machinery. Governors and judges in various provinces were alerted, with efforts made to thwart Bayezid's potential escape, involving Crimea's Khan in anticipation of a Black Sea crossing.

On June 5, the Sultan personally moved to Anatolia in preparation for a campaign against Bayezid. Now, Bayezid found himself confronting his father's anger and disapproval from both the military and scholarly circles. On June 22, 1559, a decree was issued just three weeks after Bayezid's defeat, directing the kadi of Kütahya to promptly seize his assets and possessions in the region. The edict also sought assistance, offering rewards in exchange, for locating Bayezid.

== Refuge in the Safavid Empire ==
Bayezid marched east from Amasya on 7 July 1559 with four of his sons and ten thousand men. Despite orders, many officials refrained from engaging him during his journey from Amasya to Bayburt and then to Erzurum. There, governors-general caught up with him and attacked. Bayezid disengaged and fled to Safavid territory. His actions raised concerns within the Ottoman establishment about the potential threat of his forceful return and the possibility of an alliance with Tahmasp I, the Shahanshah of Safavid Persia. To preempt any aggression, additional forces were deployed along the Safavid border, and placed on high alert. In the autumn of 1559, he reached the Safavid town of Yerevan, where he was received with great respect by its governor. In October, he reached Qazvin, where he was welcomed by Tahmasp. Although Tahmasp initially wholeheartedly and lavishly welcomed Bayezid, including giving magnificent parties in his honour, he later imprisoned him on the request of Sultan Suleiman in April 1560. Suleiman had consulted Chief Jurist Ebussuud Efendi about Bayezid's execution.

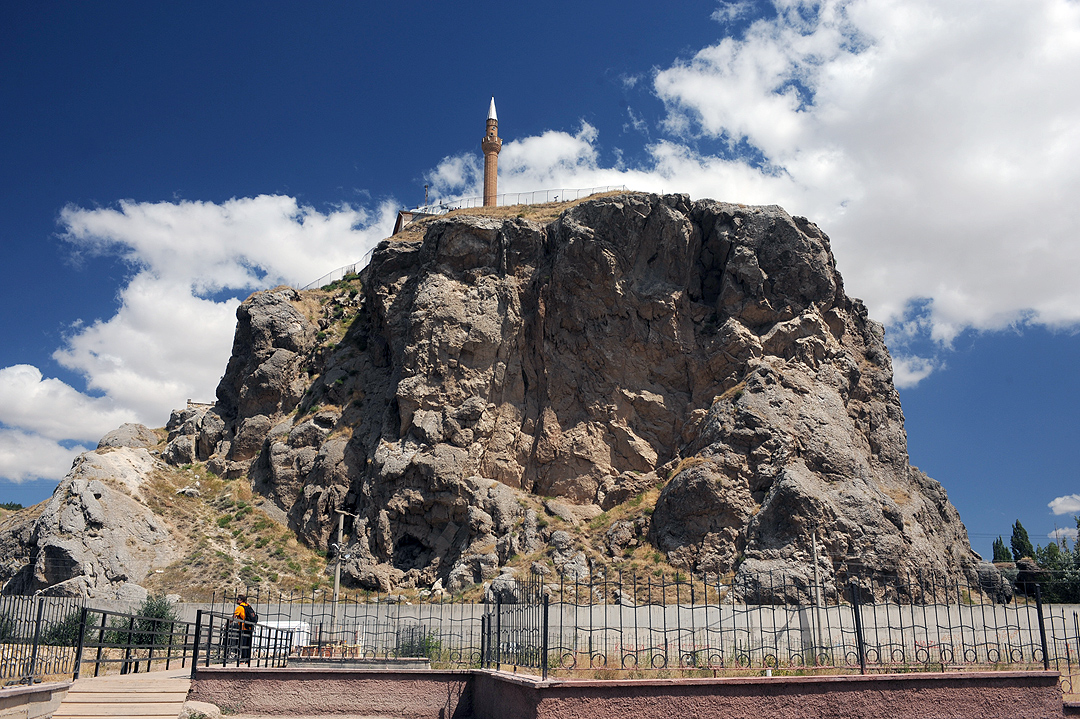
Bayezid's tomb is in Yukarı Tekke Mosque, Sivas

Both Suleiman and Selim sent envoys to Persia to persuade the shah to execute Bayezid. For the coming one and half year in fact, embassies would continue to travel between Istanbul and Qazvin. On 16 July 1561, what would be the last of the Ottoman embassies would arrive, whose formal task, like the previous embassies, was to try to return Bayezid to Istanbul. This included the governor of Van Hüsrev Pasha, Sinan Pasha, Ali Aqa Chavush Bashi, and a retinue of two hundred officials. In the letter that was given with the embassy, Suleiman also declared his readiness to reconfirm the Treaty of Amasya (1555) and to begin a new era of Ottoman–Safavid relations. Suleiman, throughout the embassies, also gave Tahmasp numerous gifts. He also agreed with Tahmasp's demand to pay him for handing Bayezid over. Tahmasp was then given 400,000 gold coins.

== Execution ==
Finally, on 25 September 1561, Bayezid and his four sons were handed over by Tahmasp and executed in the environs of the Safavid capital Qazvin by the Ottoman executioner, Ali Aqa Chavush Bashi, through the way of garrotting. They were laid to rest in Sivas. Bayezid's supporters within the Ottoman territories faced pursuit, with consequences ranging from punishment, including executions, to the dismissal of tımar holders from their roles. Some individuals received pardons, but ultimately, the establishment triumphed, marking his defeat.

== Family ==
Bayezid had at least eleven children, seven sons and four daughters. Nearly all of them were issue of different mothers. Only Şehzade Osman and Şehzade Mahmud were full brothers.

=== Sons ===
Bayezid had at least seven sons. All of Bayezid's sons still alive in 1561 were executed along with their father by order of their grandfather, Suleiman the Magnificent.

- Şehzade Orhan (1544, Karaman – 25 September 1561, Qazvin, buried in Melik-i Acem Mausoleum, Sivas), governor of Çorum (1558-1559), educated by Çandarlızade Halil Bey and Abdhurrahman El-Gubari, described as "surprisingly beautiful";
- Şehzade Osman (1545, Karaman – between 1553 and 1560). Governor of Karahişâr-ı Şarkî and Canik.
- Şehzade Abdullah (1548, Karaman, - 25 September 1561, Qazvin, buried in Melik-i Acem Mausoleum, Sivas).
- Şehzade Mahmud (1552, Karaman, – 25 September 1561, Qazvin, buried in Melik-i Acem Mausoleum, Sivas), Governor of Canik.
- Şehzade Mehmed (1558, Kütahya or Amasya - 25 September 1561, Qazvin).
- Şehzade Murad (c. 1559, Amasya – July 1561, Bursa, buried in Muradiye Complex, Bursa);
- Şehzade Süleyman (c. 1561, Amasya - 3 October 1561, Bursa). Still a newborn, he was executed by order of Suleiman the Magnificent.

=== Daughters ===
Bayezid had at least four daughters:

- Mihrimah Sultan (born c. 1547, Karaman – Lûristân, 1602), In 1562, she married Müzaffer Pasha (who died in 1593), governor of Baghdad, Şehr-i Zor, Kıbrıs, Lûristân. She had two sons and a daughter: Sultanzade Mehmed Bey, Sultanzade Murad Bey and Hatice Hanımsultan.
- Hatice Sultan (c. 1550, Karaman –c.1576);
- Ayşe Sultan (1553, Karaman – September 1601, buried in Eyüp Sultan Cemetery), She married firstly Eretnaoglu Koca Ali Pasha in 1568 and had a son, Sultanzade Mehmed Bey (born in 1572); later married Gazanfer Pasha, and had a son, Sultanzade Osman Bey (died October 1584);
- Hanzade Sultan (1556, Kütahya – after 1561).

== In popular culture ==
In the 2011–2014 TV series Muhteşem Yüzyıl he is portrayed by Aras Bulut İynemli.

== Bibliography ==
- Çiçekler, Mustafa (2011-12-19). "Şehzâde Bayezid Ve Farsça Divançesi". Şarkiyat Mecmuası (in Turkish) (8). İstanbul Üniversitesi. ISSN 1307-5020.
- Gülten, Sadullah (2012). "Kanuni'nin Maktûl Bir Şehzadesi: Bayezid". Ordu Üniversitesi Sosyal Bilimler Araştırmaları Dergisi. 3 (6): 96–104.
- Mitchell, Collin P. (2009). The Practice of Politics in Safavid Iran: Power, Religion and Rhetoric. I.B.Tauris. ISBN 978-0857715883.
- Murphey, R. (2008). Exploring Ottoman Sovereignty: Tradition, Image and Practice in the Ottoman Imperial Household, 1400-1800. Bloomsbury Academic. ISBN 978-1-84725-220-3.
- Peirce, Leslie P. (1993). The imperial harem : women and sovereignty in the Ottoman Empire. New York. ISBN 0-19-507673-7. OCLC 27811454.
- Şahin, K. (2013). Empire and Power in the Reign of Süleyman: Narrating the Sixteenth-Century Ottoman World. Cambridge Studies in Islamic Civilization. Cambridge University Press. ISBN 978-1-139-62060-4.
- Şahin, K. (2023). Peerless Among Princes: The Life and Times of Sultan Süleyman. Oxford University Press. ISBN 978-0-19-753163-1.
- Turan, Şerafettin (1961). Kanunînin Oğlu Şehzade Bayezid Vak'ası. Ankara: Turk Tarih Kirumu Basimevi.
- Yermolenko, Galina (April 2005). Roxolana: "The Greatest Empresse of the East. DeSales University, Center Valley, Pennsylvania.
