= Safavid campaign (1548–1549) =

- Part of Ottoman–Safavid War (1532–1555)
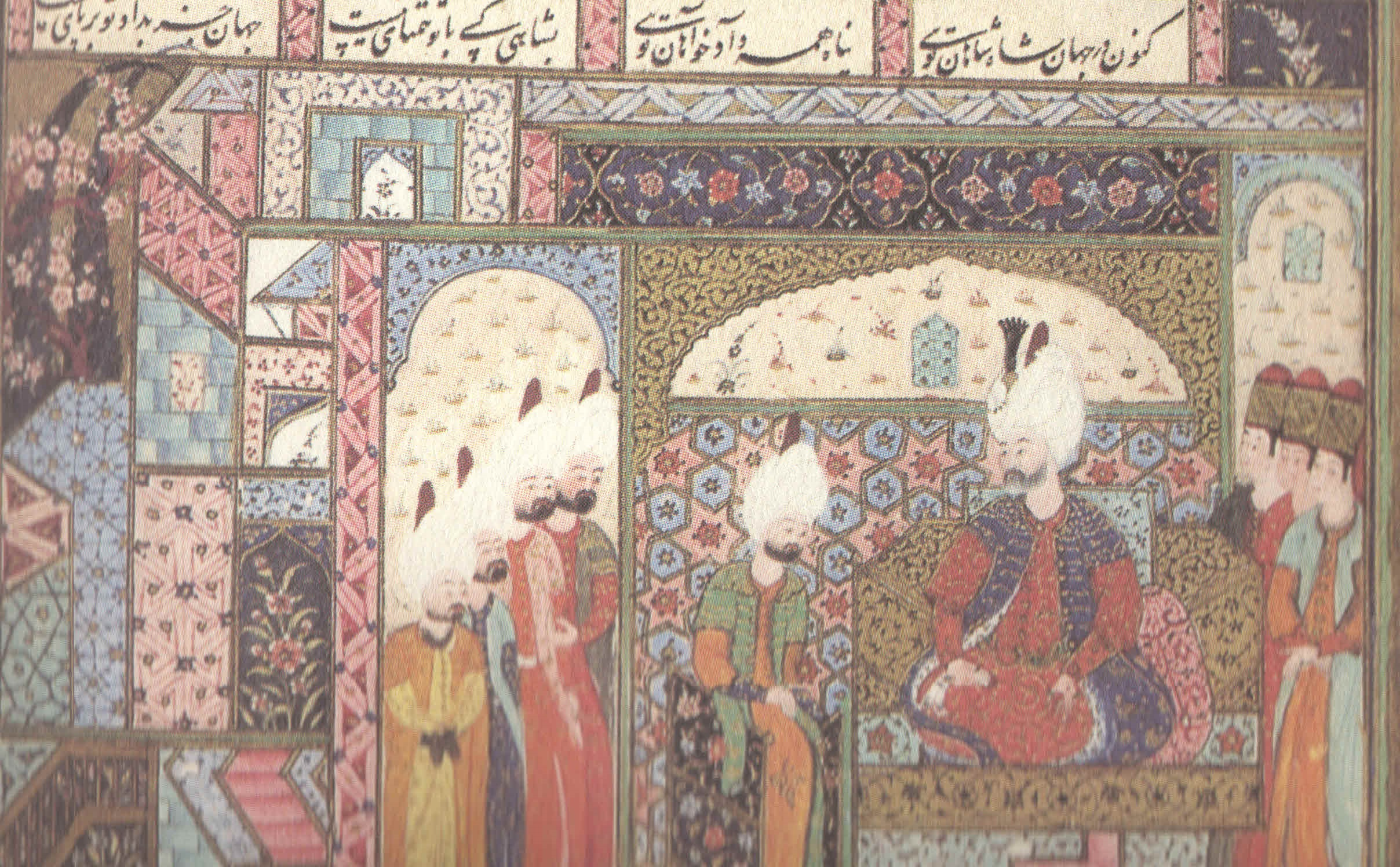
- The Safavid campaign
Date	1548–1549
Location	Van, Tabriz
Result	Ottoman victory
Territorial changes	The Ottomans retook Van and Tabriz.

Belligerents
Ottoman Empire	Safavid Iran

Commanders and leaders
Sultan Suleiman	Tahmasp I

Strength
40,000	Unknown

Casualties and losses
20,000	Unknown

The Safavid campaign (1548–1549) is the name given to the campaign that Suleiman launched from Constantinople on March 29, 1548, and continued for a year.

While Suleiman was on his campaign against Austria, Safavid Shah Tahmasp I seized Tabriz, Nakhchivan, and Van. He also firmly established Shiite rule, even sending spies called "caliphs" to the region. Tahmasp's brother, Elkas Mirza, wanted to ascend the Safavid throne. He rebelled but failed and sought refuge with Suleiman I. At this time, Ulama Khan, the governor of Bosnia, knowing the plight of the Iranian people well, was appointed Beylerbey of Erzurum and assigned as Elkas's tutor. Elkas and Suleiman I, along with their forces, departed from Istanbul on March 29, 1548.

Meanwhile, the French king Francis I, enemy of the Habsburgs, and Suleiman the Magnificent were moving forward in a Franco-Ottoman alliance, formalized in 1536, that would counterbalance the Habsburg threat. In 1547, when Suleiman attacked Persia, France sent its ambassador Gabriel de Luetz, to accompany him in his campaign. Gabriel de Luetz gave military advice to Suleiman, as when he advised on artillery placement during the Siege of Van. At the same time, Portuguese forces helped the Persians to win a battle near the Euphrates against the Ottomans with a certain number of troops and twenty cannons.

Sultan Suleiman I embarked on the Tabriz campaign and arrived in Akşehir on April 19th. Passing through Konya, Niğde, and Kayseri, Sultan Suleiman, with his imperial army, reached the Sivas province on May 25th, 1548. His eldest son, Crown Prince Mustafa, was the governor of Amasya at the time. Prince Mustafa arrived, kissed his father's hand, and, unlike the other princes, participated in the campaign for a short period. Sultan Suleiman sent Prince Selim to Edirne to protect Rumelia, while keeping his other son, Prince Bayezid, in the Karaman Sanjak.

Shah Tahmasb, aware of the developments in the Ottoman campaign, also gathered his army. Upon learning that the Sultan had arrived in Khoy, Shah Tahmasb I of Iran, based in Tabriz, ordered the entire city evacuated and retreated to Qazvin himself. On July 27, 1548, the Sultan captured Tabriz. After spending five days in the city, Suleiman I moved to Van and besieged the fortress. Van fortress was captured on August 25. On September 29, the Sultan moved to Diyarbakır, and on November 25 to Aleppo, where he spent the winter. Sultan Suleiman returned to Istanbul on December 21.

== Sources ==
- Çetinsaya, Gökhan (2012). The Ottoman Empire A History. Timaş Akademi. p. 110. ISBN 9786050846430.
- Thomas, David (2015). Christian-Muslim Relations. A Bibliographical History. Volume 7 Central and Eastern Europe, Asia, Africa and South America (1500-1600). Brill. p. 644. ISBN 9789004298484.
- Tucker, Spencer C. (2019). Middle East Conflicts from Ancient Egypt to the 21st Century. Bloomsbury Publishing. ISBN 9798216117292.
- Farrokh, Kaveh (20 December 2011). Iran at War: 1500-1988. Bloomsbury Publishing. ISBN 978-1-78096-240-5.
