= Ottoman–Safavid War (1532–1555) =

16th-century war between the Ottoman Empire and the Safavid Empire

Ottoman–Safavid War of 1532–1555
- Part of the Ottoman–Persian Wars
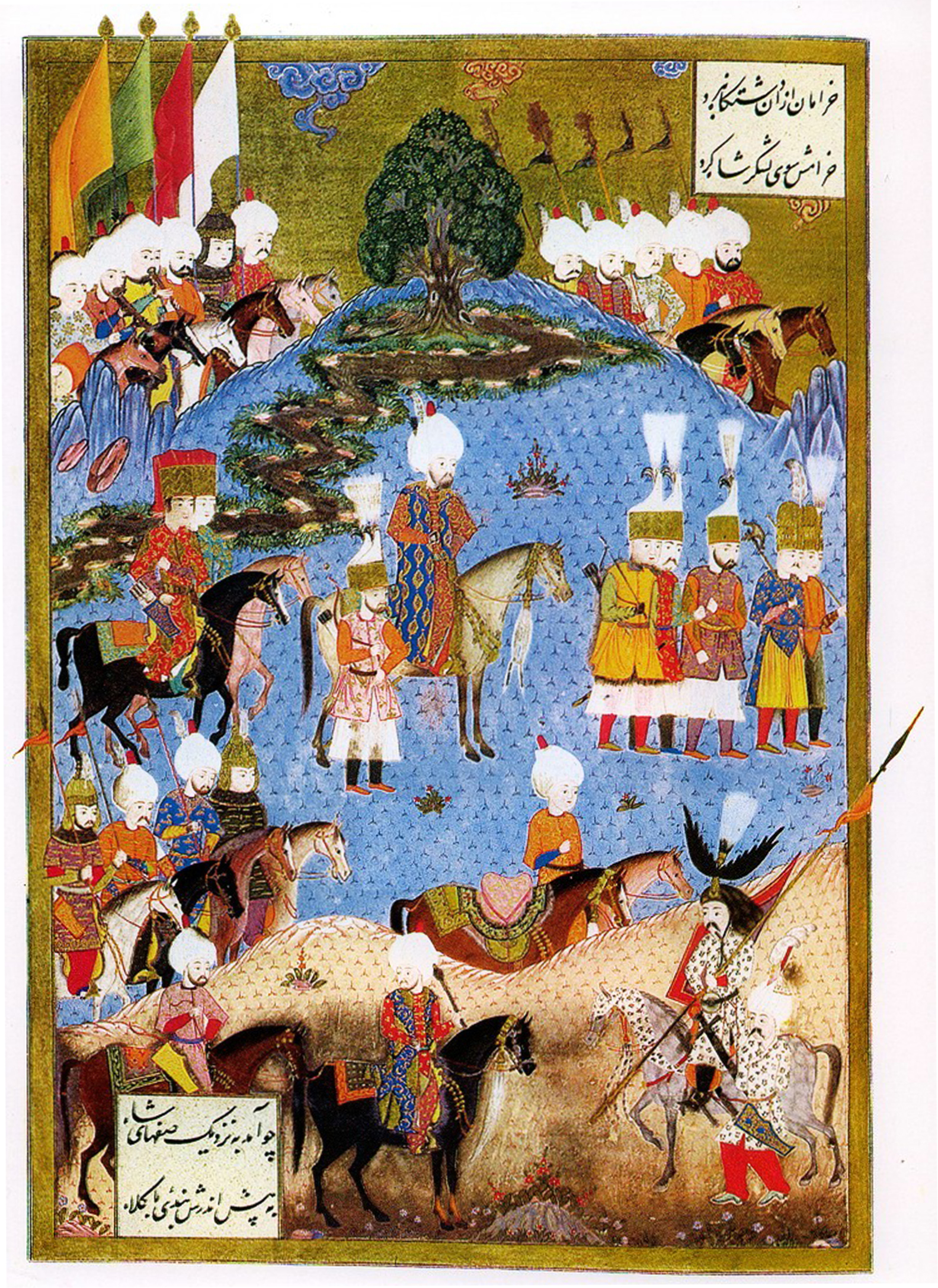
- Miniature from the Süleymanname depicting Suleiman marching with an army in Nakhchivan, summer 1554, at the end of the Ottoman-Safavid War
Date	1532–1555
Location	Mesopotamia, Armenian Highlands, Iranian Azarbaijan
Result	Ottoman victory
Territorial changes	Ottomans gain large parts of Mesopotamia (Iraq), Western Iraq, Western Armenia, and Western Georgia; Iran retains Tabriz, Eastern Georgia, Eastern Armenia, Eastern Kurdistan, Dagestan, and Azerbaijan and the rest of their north-western borders as they were prior to the war.; Erzurum, Van, and Shahrizor become buffer zones. Kars is declared neutral.

Belligerents
Safavid Iran	Ottoman Empire

Commanders and leaders
Shah Tahmasp I Shahverdi Sultan; Shahzada Ismail Mirza; Qadi Jahan Qazvini #	(Ottoman Empire) Sultan Suleiman I (Ottoman Empire) Grand Vizier Ibrahim Pasha (executed) (Ottoman Empire) İskender Çelebi (executed) (Ottoman Empire) Grand Vizier Rüstem Pasha (Ottoman Empire) Şehzade Mustafa (executed) (Ottoman Empire) Şehzade Selim (Ottoman Empire) Şehzade Bayezid (Ottoman Empire) Alqas Mirza (POW) # (Ottoman Empire) Grand Vizier Ahmed Pasha (executed)

Strength
60,000 men 10 pieces of artillery	200,000 men 300 pieces of artillery

Casualties and losses
Heavy	1533–1536: 30,000; 1548–1549: 20,000

The Ottoman–Safavid War of 1532–1555 was one of the many military conflicts fought between the two arch rivals, the Ottoman Empire led by Suleiman the Magnificent, and the Safavid Empire led by Tahmasp I. Ottoman territorial gains were confirmed in the Peace of Amasya.

== Background ==
The war was triggered by territorial disputes between the two empires, especially when the Bey of Bitlis decided to put himself under Persian protection. Also, Tahmasp had the governor of Baghdad, a sympathiser of Suleiman, assassinated. Additionally, the Safavid governor of Azerbaijan, Ulameh Soltan, defected to the Ottomans and informed them of the ongoing struggles of the Persians with the Uzbeks as well as with various other tribes.

On the diplomatic front, the Safavids had been engaged in discussions with the Habsburgs for the formation of a Habsburg–Persian alliance that would attack the Ottoman Empire on two fronts.

== Two Iraqi Expedition (1532–1534) ==
Ottoman incursions begun as early in 1532. Grand Vizier Ibrahim Pasha successfully attacked Safavid Iraq, recaptured Bitlis, and proceeded to capture Tabriz on 15 July 1534. There, he was joined by Suleiman himself, and then captured Baghdad in December 1534. Tahmasp, who at the beginning had been on a campaign against the Uzbeks in the east, hurried his armies west but did not force a major confrontation, adopting a strategy of harassing Ottoman supply trains and scorched earth.

== Second Ottoman campaign (1548–1549) ==
While Suleiman I was on his campaign against Habsburg Austria in Hungary, Safavid Shah Tahmasp I seized Tabriz, Nakhchivan, and Van. He also firmly established Shiite rule, even sending spies called "caliphs" to the region. Tahmasp's brother, Elkas Mirza, wanted to ascend the Safavid throne. He rebelled but failed and sought refuge with Suleiman I. At this time, Ulama Khan, the governor of Bosnia, knowing the plight of the Persian people well, was appointed Beylerbey of Erzurum and assigned as Elkas's tutor. Elkas and Suleiman I, along with their forces, departed from Istanbul on March 29, 1548. Under the Grand Vizier Rüstem Pasha, Ottomans attempting to defeat the Shah once and for all, Suleiman embarked upon a second campaign in 1548–1549. This time, he was aided by Alqas Mirza, Tahmasp's half-brother, who had defected and was given a force of 40,000 cavalry to invade Persia. Again, Tahmasp adopted a scorched earth policy, laying waste to Armenia. Sultan Suleiman I embarked on the Tabriz campaign and arrived in Akşehir on April 19th. Passing through Konya, Niğde, and Kayseri, Sultan Suleiman, with his Imperial Army, reached the Sivas Province on May 25th, 1548. His eldest son, Prince Mustafa, was the governor of Amasya at the time. Prince Mustafa arrived, kissed his father's hand, and, unlike the other princes, participated in the campaign for a short time. Sultan Suleiman sent Prince Selim to Edirne to protect Rumelia, while keeping his other son, Prince Bayezid, in the Karaman Sanjak.

Meanwhile, the French king Francis I, enemy of the Habsburgs, and Suleiman the Magnificent were moving forward in a Franco-Ottoman alliance, formalized in 1536, that would counterbalance the Habsburg threat. In 1547, when Suleiman attacked Persia, France sent its ambassador Gabriel de Luetz, to accompany him in his campaign. Gabriel de Luetz gave military advice to Suleiman, as when he advised on artillery placement during the Siege of Van. At the same time, Portuguese forces helped the Persians to win a battle near the Euphrates against the Ottomans with a certain number of troops and twenty cannons.

Suleiman made gains in Tabriz, Persian ruled Armenia, secured a lasting presence in the province of Van in Eastern Anatolia, and took some forts in Georgia. Shah Tahmasb, aware of the developments in the Ottoman campaign, also gathered his army. When Shah Tahmasb I of Iran in Tabriz learned that the Sultan had arrived in Khoy, he ordered the entire city evacuated and retreated to Qazvin himself. On July 27, 1548, the Sultan captured Tabriz without difficulty. After staying in the city for 5 days, Suleiman I moved to Van and besieged the fortress. Van fortress was captured on August 25. On September 29, the Sultan moved to Diyarbakır, and on November 25 to Aleppo, where he spent the winter. Sultan Suleiman returned to Istanbul on December 21.

== Third Ottoman campaign (1553–1555) and aftermath ==
In 1553 the Ottomans, first under the Grand Vizier Rüstem Pasha, and later joined by Suleiman himself, began his third and final campaign against the Shah. Prior to that, Ismail Mirza Safavi, Tahmasp's second son, had successfully invaded eastern Anatolia, defeated the governor of Erzerum and captured the town as well as Akhlar and Arjish. Suleiman then advanced as far as Karabagh in the southern Caucasus, but again no set-piece battle took place and he only collected plunder. Nevertheless, with both sides exhausted by the war, the Peace of Amasya was signed on 29 May 1555. Suleiman returned Tabriz, but kept Baghdad, lower Mesopotamia, western Armenia, western Georgia, the mouths of the Euphrates and Tigris, and part of the Persian Gulf coast. Persia retained the rest of all its northwestern territories in the Caucasus.

Due to his heavy commitment in Persia, Suleiman was only able to send limited naval support to France in the Franco-Ottoman invasion of Corsica (1553).

== Sources ==
- Yves Bomati and Houchang Nahavandi,Shah Abbas, Emperor of Persia,1587–1629, 2017, ed. Ketab Corporation, Los Angeles, ISBN 978-1595845672, English translation by Azizeh Azodi.
- Farrokh, Kaveh (20 December 2011). Iran at War: 1500-1988. Bloomsbury Publishing. ISBN 978-1-78096-240-5.
- Mikaberidze, Alexander (2015). Historical Dictionary of Georgia (2 ed.). Rowman & Littlefield. p. xxxi. ISBN 978-1442241466.
