= Armenian highlands =

Elevated plateau in northern West Asia

- Հայկական լեռնաշխարհ
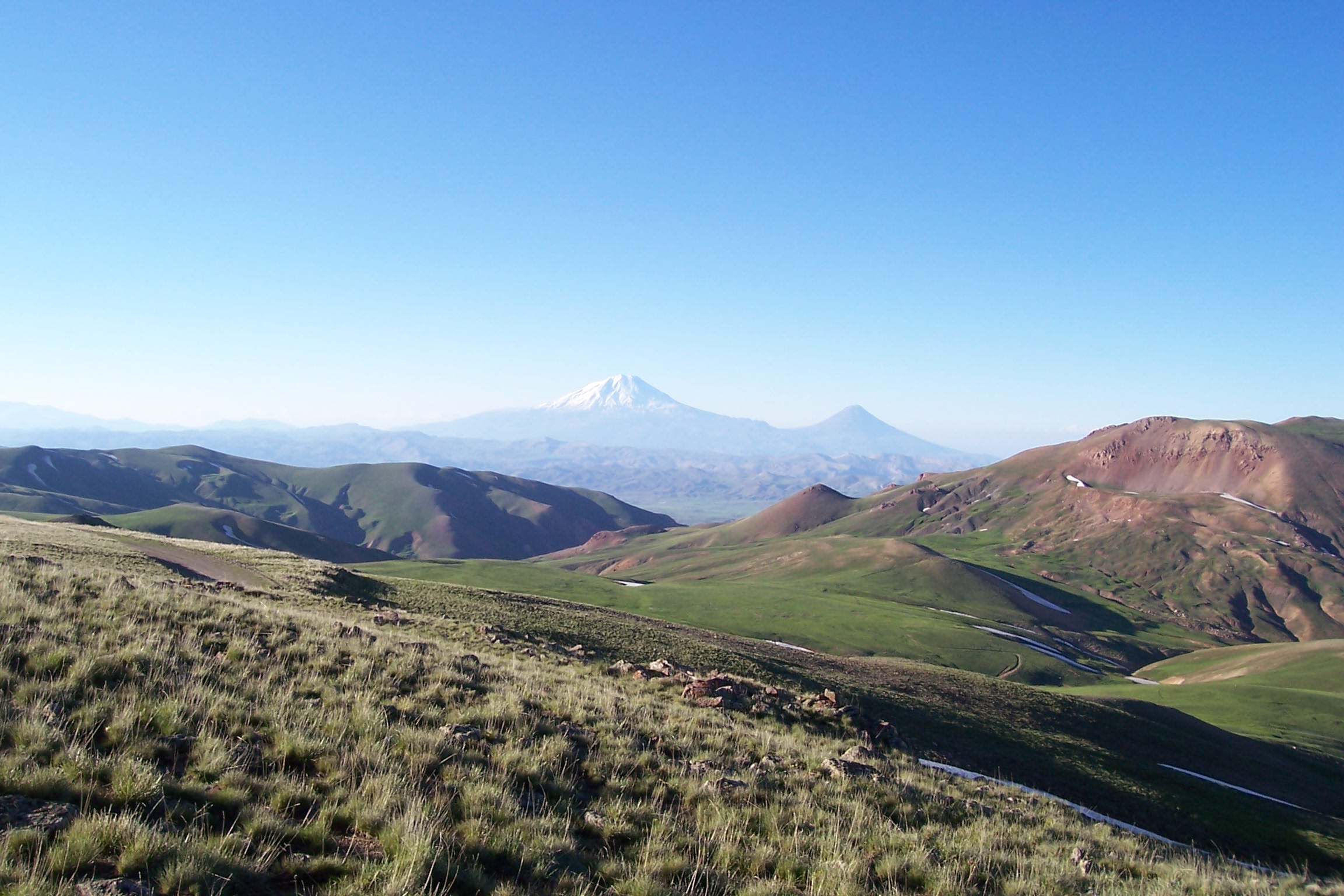
- The Armenian highlands near the Iran–Turkey border with Mount Ararat in the distance

Highest point
- Peak: Mount Ararat, Turkey
- Elevation: 5,137 m (16,854 ft)
- Coordinates: 39°42′07″N 44°17′54″E

Dimensions
- Area: 616,417 km^{2} (238,000 sq mi)

Geography
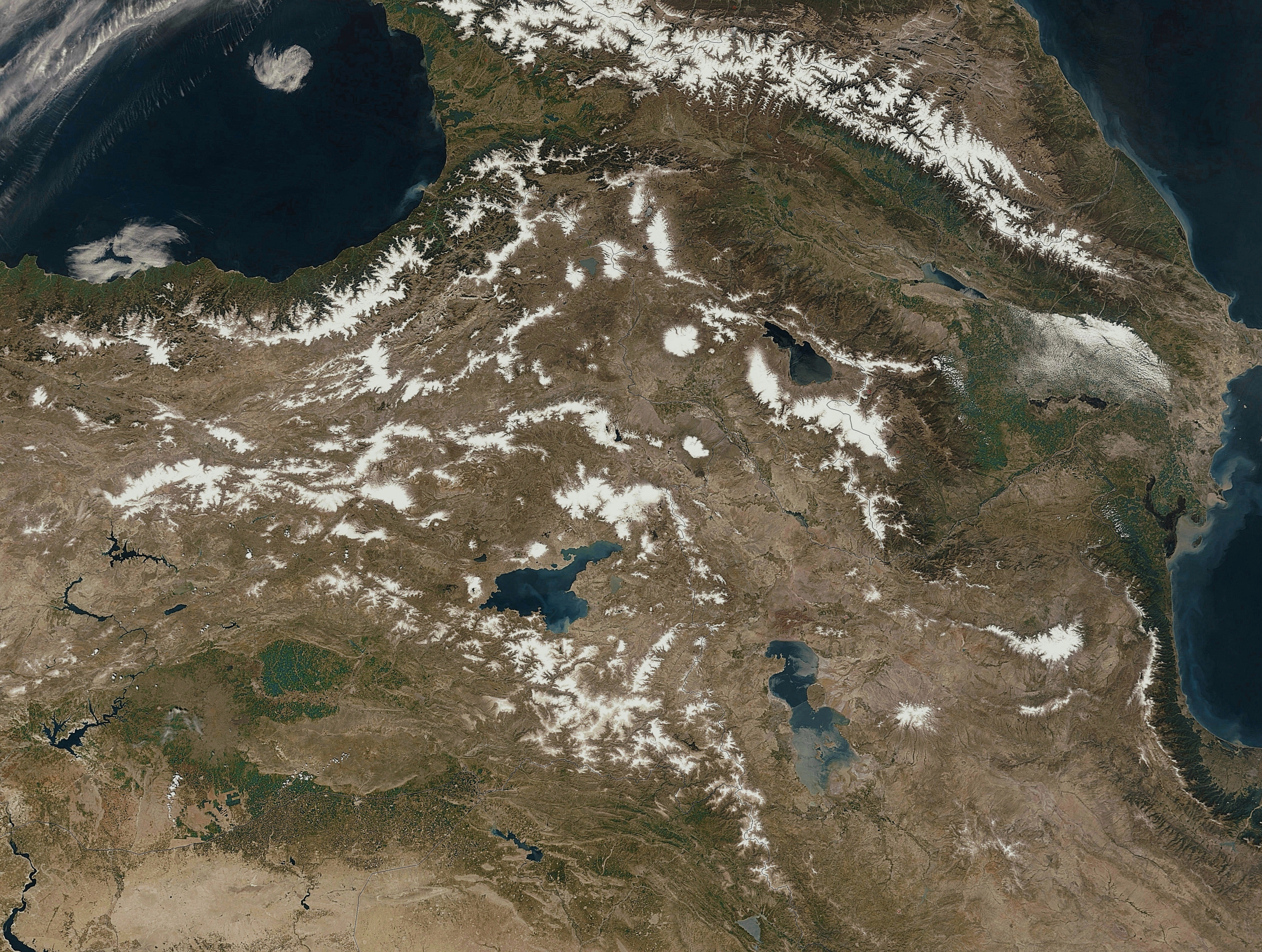
- Satellite image
- Countries: Armenia; Turkey; Azerbaijan; Iran; Georgia
- Region: West Asia
- Range coordinates: 39°17′01″N 43°22′19″E

The Armenian highlands (Armenian: Հայկական լեռնաշխարհ, romanized: Haykakan leṙnašxarh; Armenian upland, Armenian plateau, or Armenian tableland) comprise the most central and the highest of the three plateaus that together form the northern sector of West Asia. Clockwise starting from the west, the Armenian highlands are bounded by the Anatolian plateau, the Caucasus, the Kura-Aras lowlands, the Iranian Plateau, and Mesopotamia. The highlands are divided into western and eastern regions, defined by the Ararat Valley where Mount Ararat, its highest summit, is located.

Since the turn of the 20th century, Western Armenia has been relabeled as "Eastern Anatolia" by Turkish authorities. Eastern Armenia is part of Lesser Caucasus, which was historically known by some as the Anti-Caucasus, meaning "opposite of the Caucasus".

During the Iron Age, the region was known by variations of the name Ararat (Urartu, Uruatri, Urashtu). Later, the Highlands were known as Armenia Major, a central region to the history of Armenians, and one of the four geopolitical regions associated with Armenians, the other three being Armenia Minor, Sophene, and Commagene. The highlands are primarily defined by the geographical dispersal of its native inhabitants, the Armenians. Prior to the appearance of nominally Armenian people in historical records, historians have hypothesized that the region must have been home to various ethnic groups who became homogenous when the Armenian language came to prominence. The population of the Armenian highlands has had a high level of regional genetic continuity for over 6,000 years. Recent studies indicate that the Armenian people descend from the indigenous people of the Armenian highlands and form a distinct genetic isolate in the region. The region was also inhabited during Antiquity by minorities such as Assyrians, Georgians, Greeks, Jews, and Iranians. During the Middle Ages, Arabs and particularly Turkmens and Kurds settled in large numbers in the Armenian highlands.

The region was administered for most of its known history by Armenian nobility and states, whether it was as part of a fully independent Armenian state, as vassals, or as part of a foreign state. Since the 1040s, the highlands have been under the rule of various Turkic peoples and the Safavid dynasty, with pockets of Armenian autonomy in places such as Artsakh. Much of Eastern Armenia, which had been ruled by the Safavids from the 16th century, became part of the Russian Empire in 1828 and was later incorporated into the Soviet Union, while much of Western Armenia was ruled by the Ottoman Empire and later incorporated into modern Turkey. Today, the region is divided between Armenia, Azerbaijan, Georgia, Iran, and Turkey.

The Armenians of Western Armenia were exterminated during the Armenian genocide (1915–1917), orchestrated by the Committee of Union and Progress as part of their Turkification policies. Today, Western Armenia is mainly inhabited by Turks, Kurds, Azerbaijanis, Assyrians, and a small population of Armenians (including crypto-Armenians and Hemshins). Eastern Armenia is mainly inhabited by Armenians, Azerbaijanis, and Georgians.

== Geography and topography ==
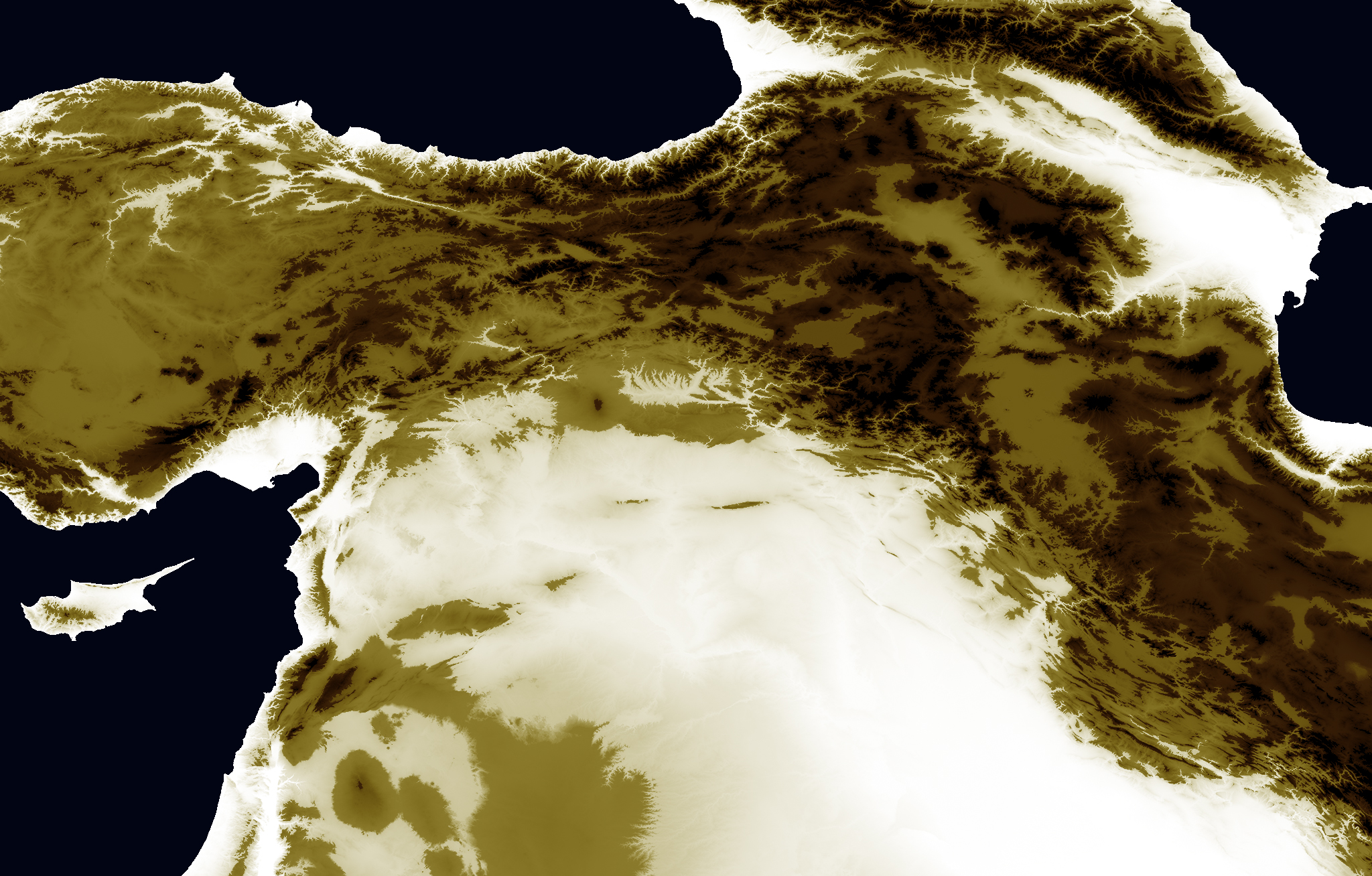
Height map emphasizing the natural shape of the Armenian Highlands.

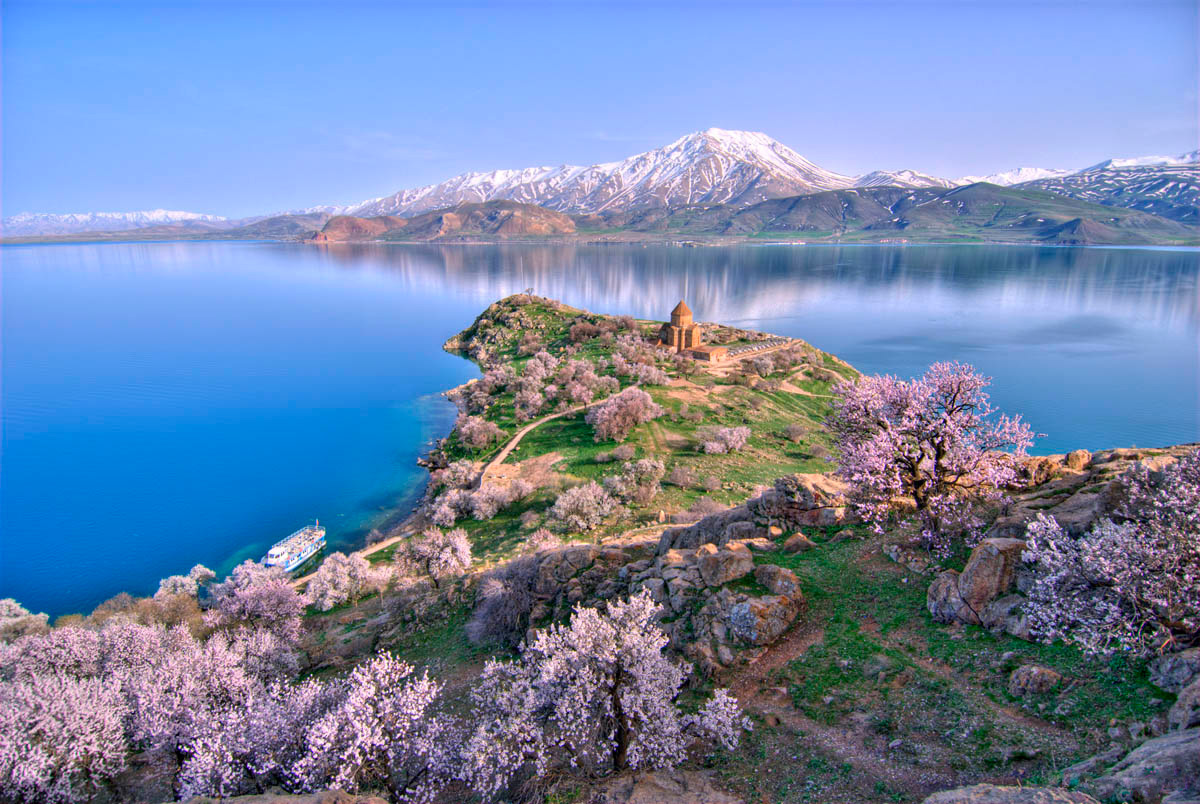
Mount Artos, Lake Van, from Akhtamar Island

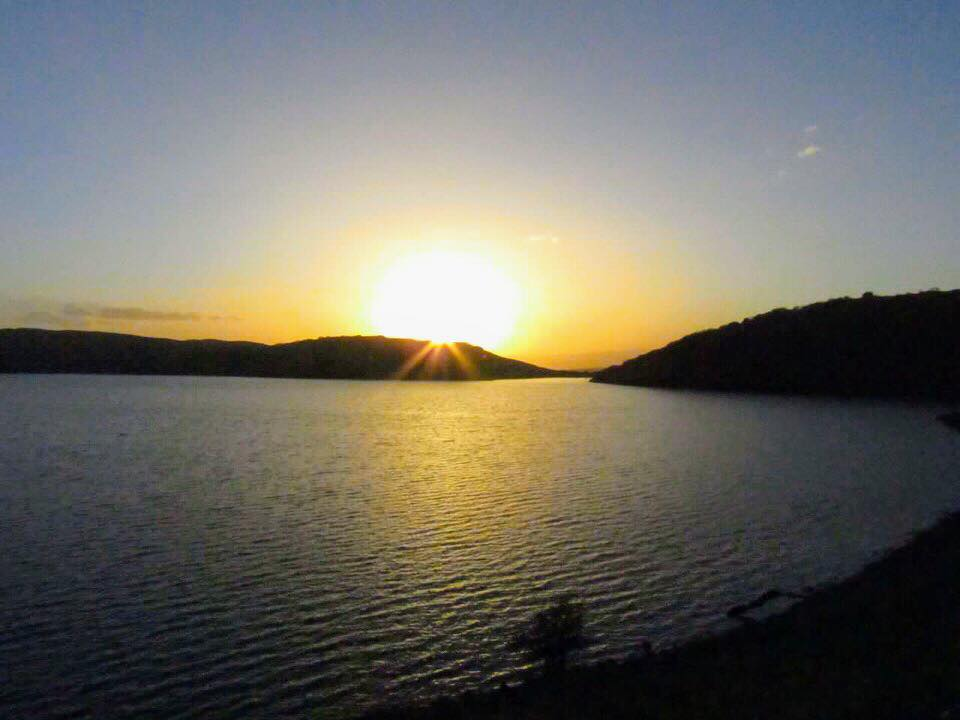
Lake Akdoğan

The Armenian highlands is part of the Alpide belt, forming part of the Eurasian range that stretches from the Pontic Mountains to the Malay Peninsula. Its total area is about 400,000 km^{2}. The average height of the plateau is between 1000–2000 meters and includes prominent landmarks such as Mount Ararat (5,205 m) and Mount Aragats (4,180 m).

Historically, the Armenian highlands have been the scene of great volcanic activity. Geologically recent volcanism on the area has resulted in large volcanic formations and a series of massifs and tectonic movement has formed the three largest lakes in the Highlands: Lake Sevan, Lake Van, and Lake Urmia.

Despite the region's rich water resources and fertile soil nourished by rivers like the Euphrates, Tigris, and Arax, the present-day Republic of Armenia occupies one of the least fertile parts of historic Armenia. Armenians who fled their homeland in the Ottoman Empire during the Armenian Genocide have regarded Eastern Armenia as "only a dusty province" without Western Armenia.

The central, axial chain of Armenian highland ridges, running from west to east across Western Armenia, is called the Anti-Taurus. In the west, the Anti-Taurus departs to the north from the Central (Cilician) Taurus, and, passing right in the middle of the Armenian plateau, parallel to the Eastern (Armenian) Taurus, ends in the east at the Ararat peaks.

To the west is the Anatolian plateau, which rises slowly from the lowland coast of the Aegean Sea and converges with the Armenian highlands to the east of Cappadocia. The Caucasus extends to the northeast of the Armenian highlands, with the Kura river forming its eastern boundary in the Kura-Aras lowlands. To its southeast is the Iranian plateau, where the elevation drops rapidly by about 600 metres (2,000 ft) to 1,500 metres (5,000 ft) above sea level. To the southwest is Mesopotamia (or Fertile Crescent).

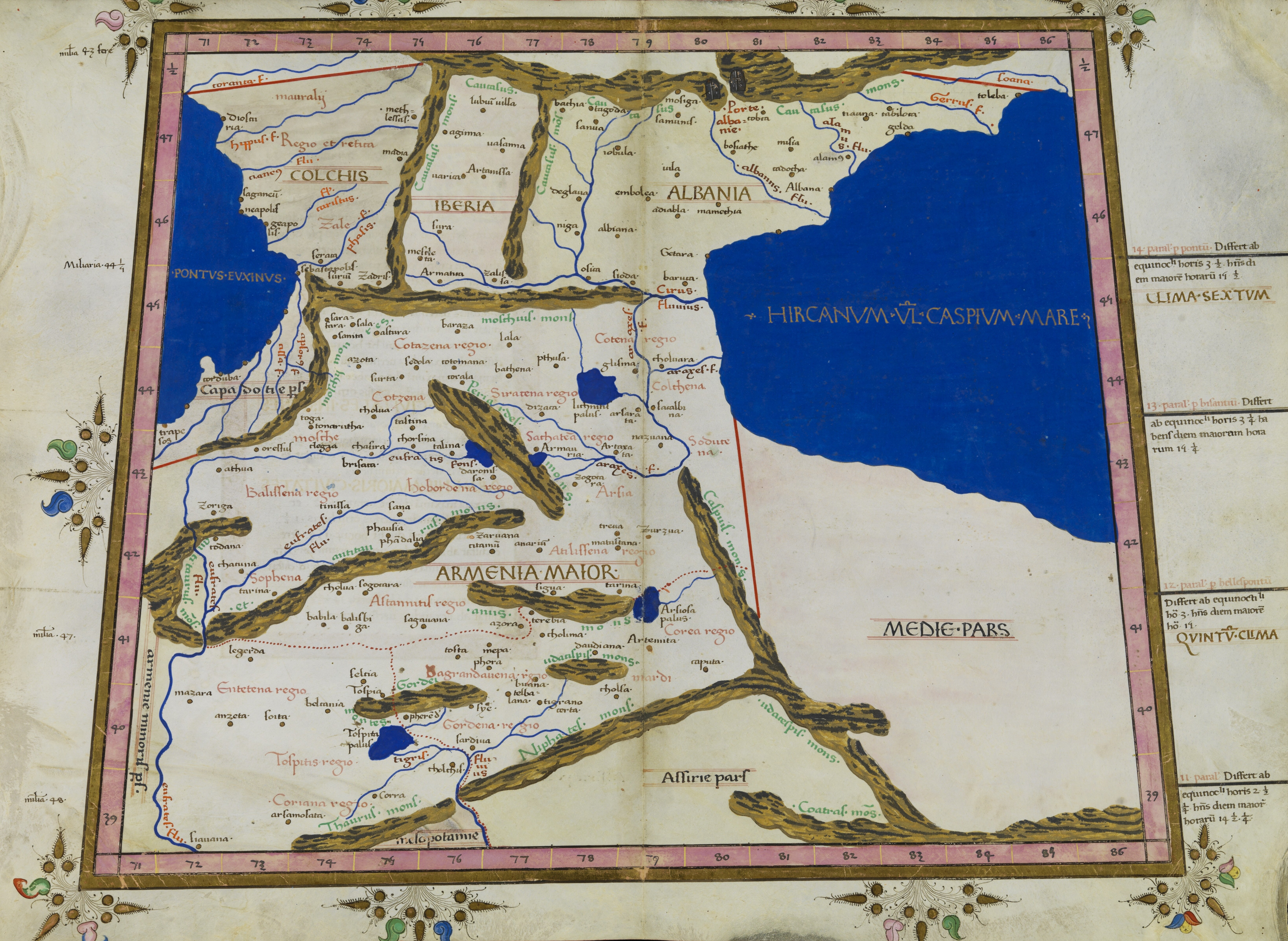
Armenian highlands Ptolemy Cosmographia 1467

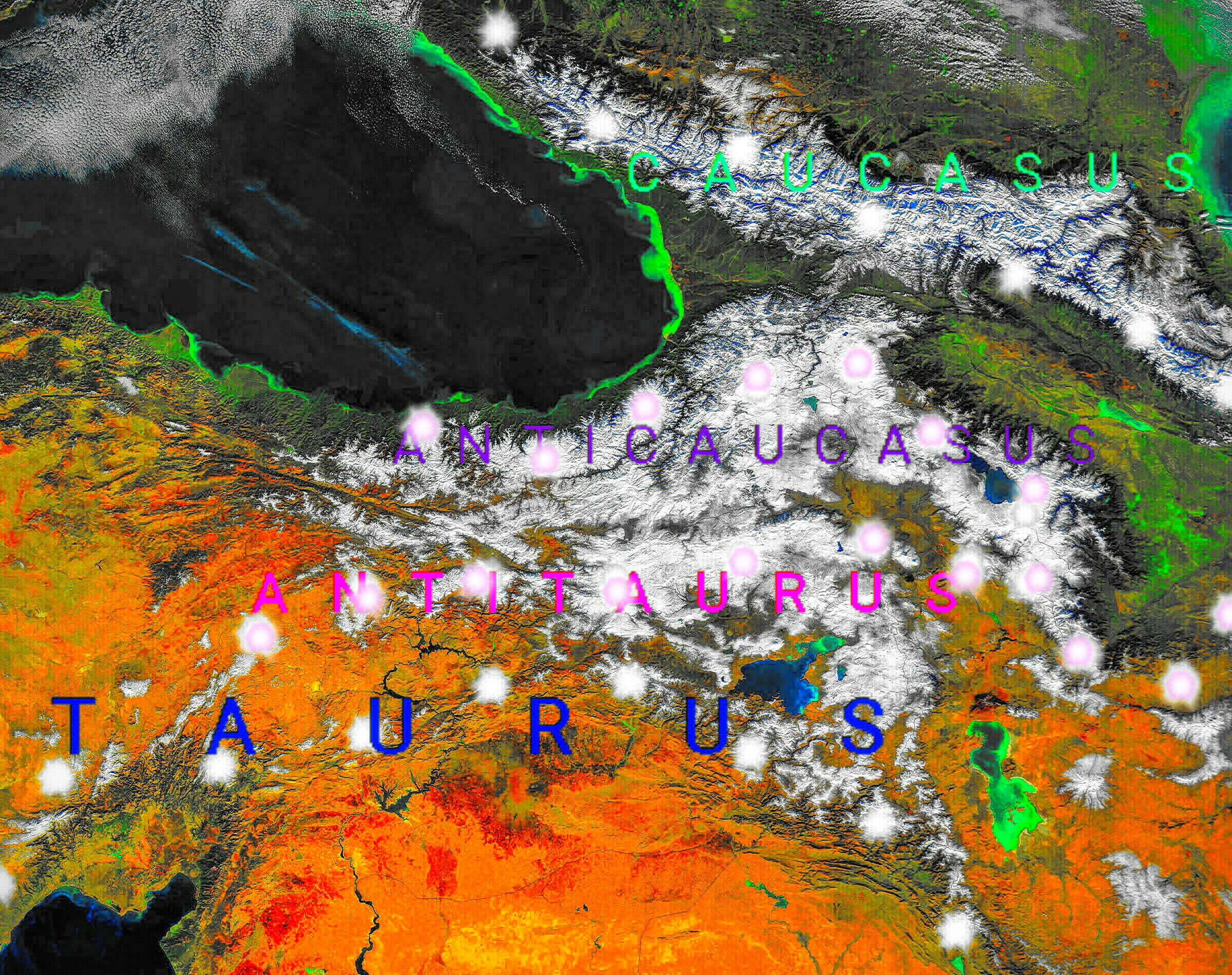
Armenian highlands and Caucasus mountains

According to Thomas A. Sinclair in the third edition of the Encyclopaedia of Islam:

It occupied a large part of present-day Turkey, the whole of the territory of the present Republic of Armenia, further districts, now in the Republic of Azerbaijan, immediately adjacent to the east, and the northwest corner of modern Iran. The preceding is the definition of Armenia assumed in texts of the Classical and Late Classical periods and laid out explicitly in the early seventh-century C.E. document called the Ašxarhac'oyc' ("Geography"). The earlier Arab geographers know Armenia (Arminīya) under this definition, but the Muslim geographers of the late Middle Ages know Armenia as a much more restricted area, effectively the regions of Lake Van, Erzurum, and the upper Aras in Azerbaijan (Adhharbāyjān).

=== Climate ===
The region is characterized by hot summers and harsh winters.

== Ethnography ==
The Armenian highlands are primarily defined by the historical presence and dispersal of its native inhabitants, the Armenian people. Over one thousand years, from Byzantine relocations to the mass deportations of 1915–1922, Armenians were gradually and continuously displaced, leaving them a minority in much of their historic homeland and occupying only 10% of their homeland today.

== History ==
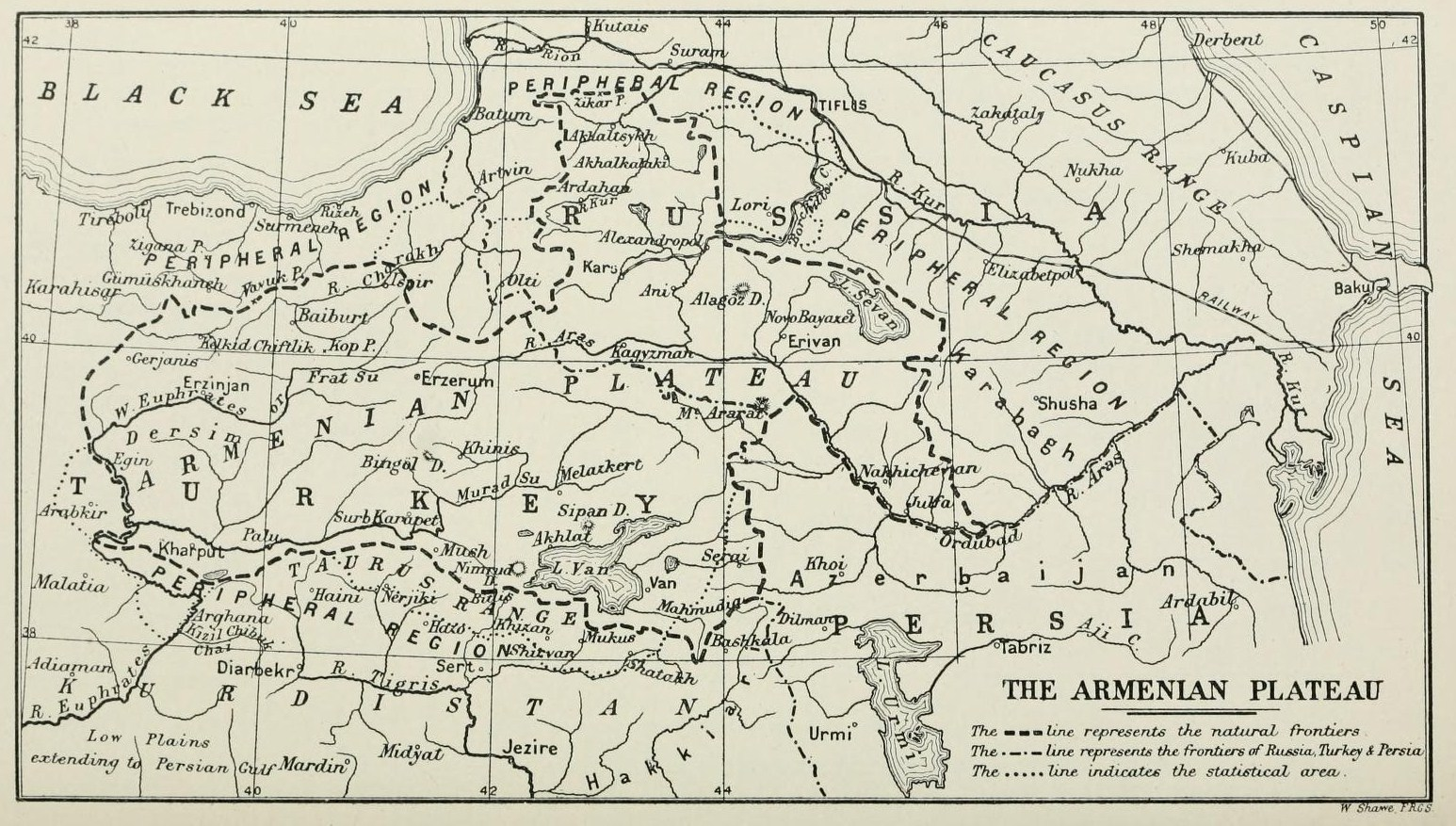
The natural borders of the Armenian plateau and its peripheral regions according to H. F. B. Lynch (1901).

=== Prehistory ===
From 4000 to 1000 BC, tools and trinkets of copper, bronze and iron were commonly produced in this region and traded in neighboring lands where those metals were less abundant. It is also traditionally believed to be one of the possible locations of the Garden of Eden.

=== Antiquity ===
The Armenian Plateau has been called the "epicenter of the Iron Age", since it appears to be the location of the first appearance of Iron Age metallurgy in the late 2nd millennium BC. In the Early Iron Age, the Kingdom of Van controlled much of the region, until it was overthrown by the Medes and Orontid dynasty.

In the Epic of Gilgamesh, the land of Aratta is placed in a geographic space that could be describing the Armenian plateau. In Antiquity, the population living on the Highlands was ethnically diverse, but in the Achaemenid period (550–330 BC), Armenian-speakers came to prominence. Recent studies have shown that Armenians are indigenous to the Armenian highlands and form a distinct genetic isolate in the region. There are signs of considerable genetic admixture in Armenians between 3000 BC and 2000 BC, these mixture dates also coincide with the legendary establishment of Armenia in 2492 BCE, but they subside to insignificant levels since 1200 BC, remaining stable until today.

=== Middle Ages: Arab and Turkic conquests ===
The Muslim conquest of the Armenian Highlands began in the mid-7th century, with the Arabs occupying Western Armenia briefly.

Seljuk Turks later arrived in Eastern Armenia in the 1040s and expanded westward, conquering territories and populating the peninsula until finally the Ottoman Empire was declared in 1299. The Seljuks' victory at the Battle of Manzikert made them dominant in the region. Ruben I, Prince of Armenia, led some Armenians out of the Highlands and escaped into the mountains of Cilicia, where they founded the Armenian Kingdom of Cilicia.

In the early 13th century, as various peoples fled from the advancing Mongol onslaught, the Highlands saw the migrations of the Karluk and Kharizmian peoples. The Mongols, who did not distinguish between Christianity and Islam, reached the Highlands in 1235. With their arrival, Armenia became part of "the East" in its entirety for the first time since the territory was partitioned during the Byzantine–Sasanian wars. Considered the successors of the Abbasids, Sassanids and Seljuks, the Mongols eventually converted to Islam and established their dynasty in modern day Azerbaijan.

In 1410 the area was ruled by the Kara Koyunlu, who ruled until 1468. The pastoral culture of the Kara Koyunlu Turks undermined agricultural practices in Armenia. In 1468, the Ak Koyunlu Turks assumed power; their reign lasted until 1502 when the Safavids brought Armenia under Iranian rule. The Ottoman Turks did not take control of the highland region until 1514, several decades after Armenians in the Ottoman Empire were given millet status. The Highlands came under Ottoman control following the defeat of the Safavids at the Battle of Chalderon; they appointed Kurdish tribesman to rule over the highlands' local administrative affairs. By 1516, the Ottoman Empire had invaded all of the Armenian lands, including Cilicia.

=== Early modern period ===
From the early modern era and on, the region came directly under Safavid Iranian rule. Heavily contested for centuries between the Iranian Safavids and its archrival the Ottoman Empire, with numerous wars raging over the region, large parts of the Highlands comprising Western Armenia were finally conquered by the Ottomans in the first half of the 17th century following the Ottoman–Safavid War (1623–39) and the resulting Treaty of Zuhab. Eastern Armenia, the other major part of the Highlands, stayed in Iranian hands up to the 1828 Treaty of Turkmenchay, when it was ceded to Imperial Russia.

=== Late modern period ===
During the first half of the 19th century, the Ottoman-held parts of the Armenian highlands comprising Western Armenia formed the boundary of the Ottoman and Russian spheres of influence, after the latter had completed its conquest of the Caucasus and Eastern Armenia at the expense of its suzerain, Qajar Iran, after four major wars spanning more than two centuries.

Map of massacre locations and deportation and extermination centers during the Armenian genocide 1915–1916.

==== 20th century ====
The name "Armenia" was forbidden to be used in official documents by Ottoman authorities in the 1880s, and the region was officially renamed "Eastern Anatolia" by the Turkish successor state in the 1920s. This was the result of a Turkification campaign to play down the role of Armenians in the region. The Armenian Highlands saw a massive demographic shift after the Armenian genocide and fall of the Ottoman Empire, with Western Armenia being relabeled "Eastern Anatolia". Since the Armenian genocide and partitioning of the Ottoman Empire after World War I, the Highlands have been the boundary region of Turkey, Iran and the Soviet Union and, since the 1991 dissolution of the Soviet Union, Armenia, and parts of Georgia and Azerbaijan.

== Partition and shifts in control ==
Armenia was divided four major times during the medieval and early modern periods:

- First Partition (387): Peace of Acilisene between the Sasanian and Byzantine Empires
- Second Partition (591): Reinforcement of the earlier division after the Byzantine–Sasanian War of 572–591
- Third Partition (1555): Treaty of Amasya between the Safavid Empire and the Ottoman Empire
- Fourth Partition (1639): Treaty of Zuhab, establishing lasting borders between Persia and the Ottoman Empire

While these four events mark the major historical partitions of the Armenian highlands, control over Armenian territory shifted many more times, particularly in the 19th and 20th centuries. Notably:

- Treaty of San Stefano (1878) and Treaty of Berlin (1878): Shifted influence and promises of reform in Western Armenia under Ottoman control, following the Russo-Turkish War.
- Treaty of Alexandropol (1920): Signed between the First Republic of Armenia and Kemalist Turkey, ceding large territories under pressure — though later superseded.
- Treaty of Moscow (1921) and Treaty of Kars (1921): Signed between Soviet Russia, including its Soviet Republics, and Kemalist Turkey, which finalized borders and confirmed Turkish control over Western Armenia and other disputed regions.

== Flora and fauna ==
The apricot, known by the Romans as the prunus armenicus (the Armenian plum), was brought to Europe from the Armenian plateau.

== Notable peaks ==
Rank	Mountain	Elevation	Location
1	Mount Ararat	5,137 m (16,854 ft)	Turkey: Ağrı Province
2	Mount Cilo	4,135 m (13,566 ft)	Turkey: Hakkâri Province
3	Mount Aragats	4,090 m (13,420 ft)	Armenia: Aragatsotn Province
4	Mount Sipan	4,058 m (13,314 ft)	Turkey: Bitlis Province
5	Mount Kaputjugh	3,906 m (12,815 ft)	Armenia: Syunik Province; Azerbaijan: Ordubad
6	Mount Azhdahak	3,597 m (11,801 ft)	Armenia: Gegharkunik Province
7	Mount Trasar	3,594 m (11,791 ft)	Armenia: Syunik Province
8	Mount Artos	3,515 m (11,532 ft)	Turkey: Van Province
9	Munzur Mountains	3,463 (11.362 ft)	Turkey: Tunceli Province

== See also ==
- Ark of Nuh or Noah
- Geography of Armenia
- Haykakan Par
- History of Armenia
- Mountains of Ararat
- Neo-Assyrian Empire
  - Mount Tendürek
    - Durupınar site
- River system of Mesopotamia
  - Euphrates
  - Tigris
- Zagros Mountains
  - Mount Judi
