= Ottoman–Persian Wars =

Series of wars through the 16th to 19th centuries

- Part of the Ottoman wars in Asia
Date	1505–1823
Location	Mesopotamia (Ottoman Iraq), Caucasus (North and South Caucasus)
Result	Indecisive
Territorial changes	Ottomans consolidated their power in Eastern Anatolia, Southeastern Anatolia and Mesopotamia (Ottoman Iraq), Iran consolidates their power in the Caucasus

Belligerents
Safavid Empire; Afsharid Iran: Zand Iran; Qajar Iran	Ottoman Empire; Crimean Khanate

Commanders and leaders
Ismail I (WIA); Tahmasp I; Mohammad Khodabanda; Abbas I; Safi; Nader Shah; Karim Khan; Fath-Ali Shah	Selim I; Suleiman I; Murad III; Ahmed I; Mustafa I; Osman II; Murad IV; Mahmud I; Abdul Hamid I; Mahmud II

The Ottoman–Persian Wars also called the Ottoman–Iranian Wars were a series of wars between the Ottoman Empire and the Safavid, Afsharid, Zand, and Qajar states of Iran (Persia) through the 16th–19th centuries. The Ottomans consolidated their control of what is today Turkey in the 15th century, and gradually came into conflict with the emerging neighboring Iranian state, led by Ismail I of the Safavid dynasty. The two states were arch rivals, and were also divided by religious grounds, the Ottomans being staunchly Sunni and the Safavids being Shia. A series of military conflicts ensued for centuries during which the two empires competed for control over eastern Anatolia, the Caucasus, and Ottoman Iraq. The first war between the Ottomans and Persians was the Ottoman–Persian War (1505–1517). The final war was the Ottoman–Persian War (1820–1823).

== List ==
Name of the war	Sultan of Ottoman Empire	Shah of Persian Empire	Treaty at the end of the war	Victorious Empire
War of 1505–1517	Selim I	Ismail I	None	Ottoman Empire
War of 1532–1555	Suleiman I	Tahmasp I	Treaty of Amasya (1555)	Ottoman Empire
War of 1578–1590	Murad III	Mohammad Khodabanda, Abbas I	Treaty of Constantinople (1590)	Ottoman Empire
War of 1603–1612	Ahmed I	Abbas I	Treaty of Nasuh Pasha	Persian Empire
War of 1616–1618	Ahmed I, Mustafa I, Osman II	Abbas I	Treaty of Serav (1618)	Persian Empire
War of 1623–1639	Murad IV	Abbas I, Safi	Treaty of Zuhab (1639)	Ottoman Empire
War of 1730–1735	Mahmud I	Nader Shah	Treaty of Constantinople (1736)	Persian Empire
War of 1743–1746	Mahmud I	Nader Shah	Treaty of Kerden (1746)	Indecisive
War of 1776–1779	Abdul Hamid I	Karim Khan Zand	None	Indecisive
War of 1820–1823	Mahmud II	Fath-Ali Shah Qajar	Treaty of Erzurum (1823)	Indecisive

Among the numerous treaties, the Treaty of Zuhab of 1639 is usually considered as the most significant, as it fixed present Turkey–Iran and Iraq–Iran borders. In later treaties, there were frequent references to the Treaty of Zuhab.

=== Other conflicts ===
Name of the war	Sultan of Ottoman Empire	Shah of Persian Empire	Treaty at the end of the war	Victorious Empire
War of 1906	Abdul Hamid II	Mozaffar ad-Din Shah	None	Indecisive
War of 1914–1918	Mehmed V	Ahmad Shah	Armistice of Mudros (1918)	Indecisive

== See also ==
- Ottoman–Safavid relations
- Habsburg–Persian alliance
- Ottoman–Hotaki War (1726–1727)

== Sources ==
- Yves Bomati and Houchang Nahavandi,Shah Abbas, Emperor of Persia, 1587–1629, 2017, ed. Ketab Corporation, Los Angeles, ISBN 978-1595845672, English translation by Azizeh Azodi.
- Hala Mundhir, Fattah (1997). The Politics of Regional Trade in Iraq, Arabia, and the Gulf: 1745-1900. SUNY Press. ISBN 9781438402376.
- Jaques, Tony (30 November 2006). Dictionary of Battles and Sieges: A Guide to 8,500 Battles from Antiquity Through the Twenty-first Century [3 Volumes]. Bloomsbury Academic. ISBN 9780313335365.
- Perry, John R. (2011). "Karim Khan Zand". Encyclopaedia Iranica, Vol. XV, Fasc. 6. pp. 561–564.
- Sicker, Martin (2001). The Islamic World in Decline: From the Treaty of Karlowitz to the Disintegration of the Ottoman Empire. Greenwood Publishing Group. ISBN 027596891X.
