= Defense of Van =

Defense of Van, Siege of Van, and variants may refer to:

- Siege of Van (1394), during Timur's campaign in the Caucasus
- Siege of Van (1548), a siege in the Ottoman–Safavid War
- Defense of Van (1896), an act of self-defense by the Armenian population of Van against the armed forces of the Ottoman Empire
- Defense of Van (1915), an act of self-defense against the Ottoman Empire's attempts to massacre the Armenian population in the vilâyet of Van
