= Mount Artos =

Mountain in Van, Turkey

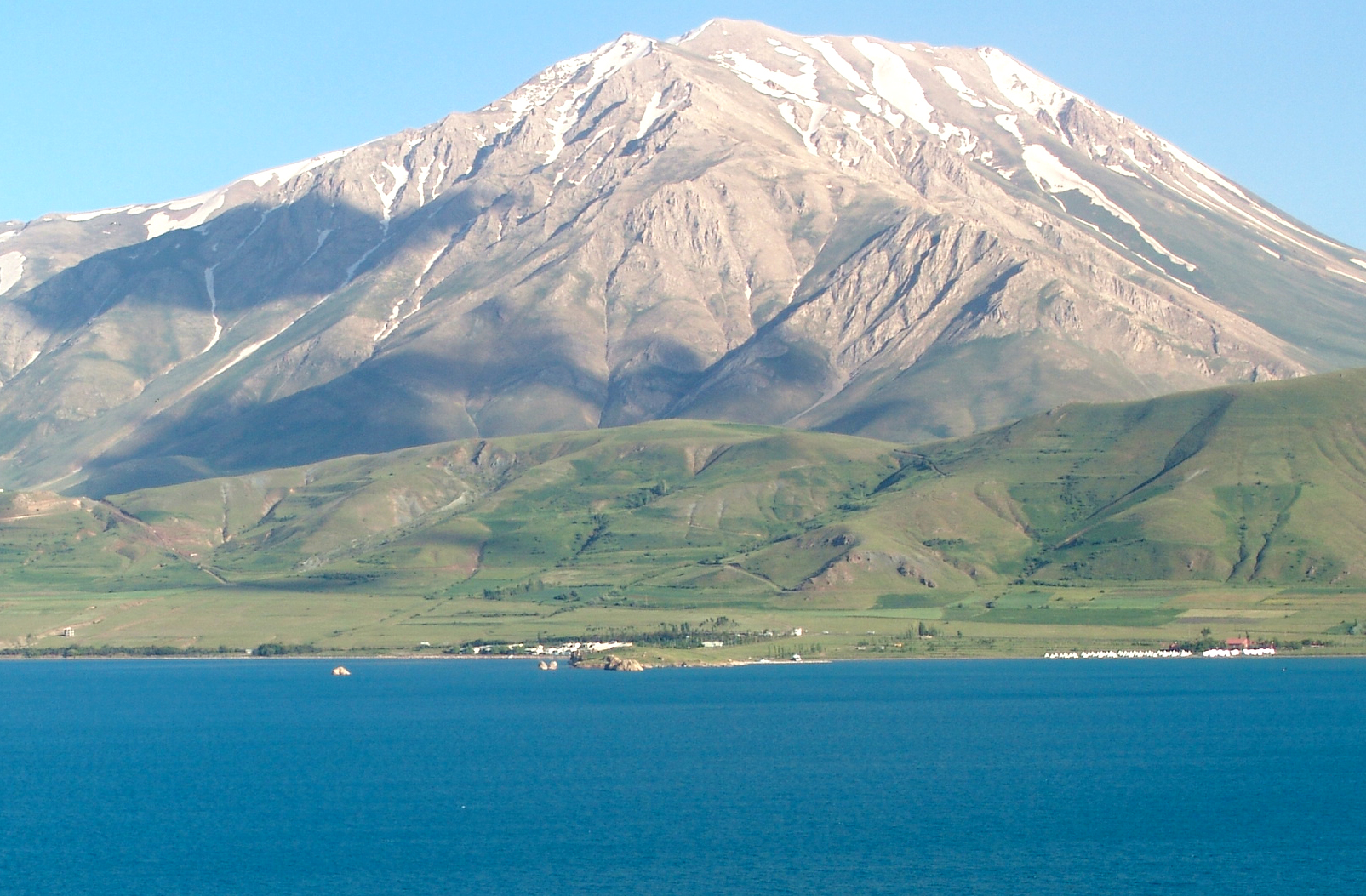
- The dormant volcano Mount Artos viewed from Akdamar Island in Lake Van

Highest point
- Elevation: 3,550 m (11,650 ft)
- Prominence: 1,013 m (3,323 ft)
- Listing: Ultra
- Coordinates: 38°14′46″N 43°06′24″E

Geography
- Location within Turkey
- Location: Gevaş, Van Province, Turkey
- Parent range: Taurus Mountains, Armenian Highlands

Geology
- Mountain type: Stratovolcano

Mount Artos (Turkish: Çadır Dağı, lit. 'Tent Mountain', Armenian: Արտոս, romanized: Artos, Kurdish: Çiyayê Artosê) is a mountain (dormant volcano) in Van Province in eastern Turkey.

It has a height of 3,550 meters above sea level

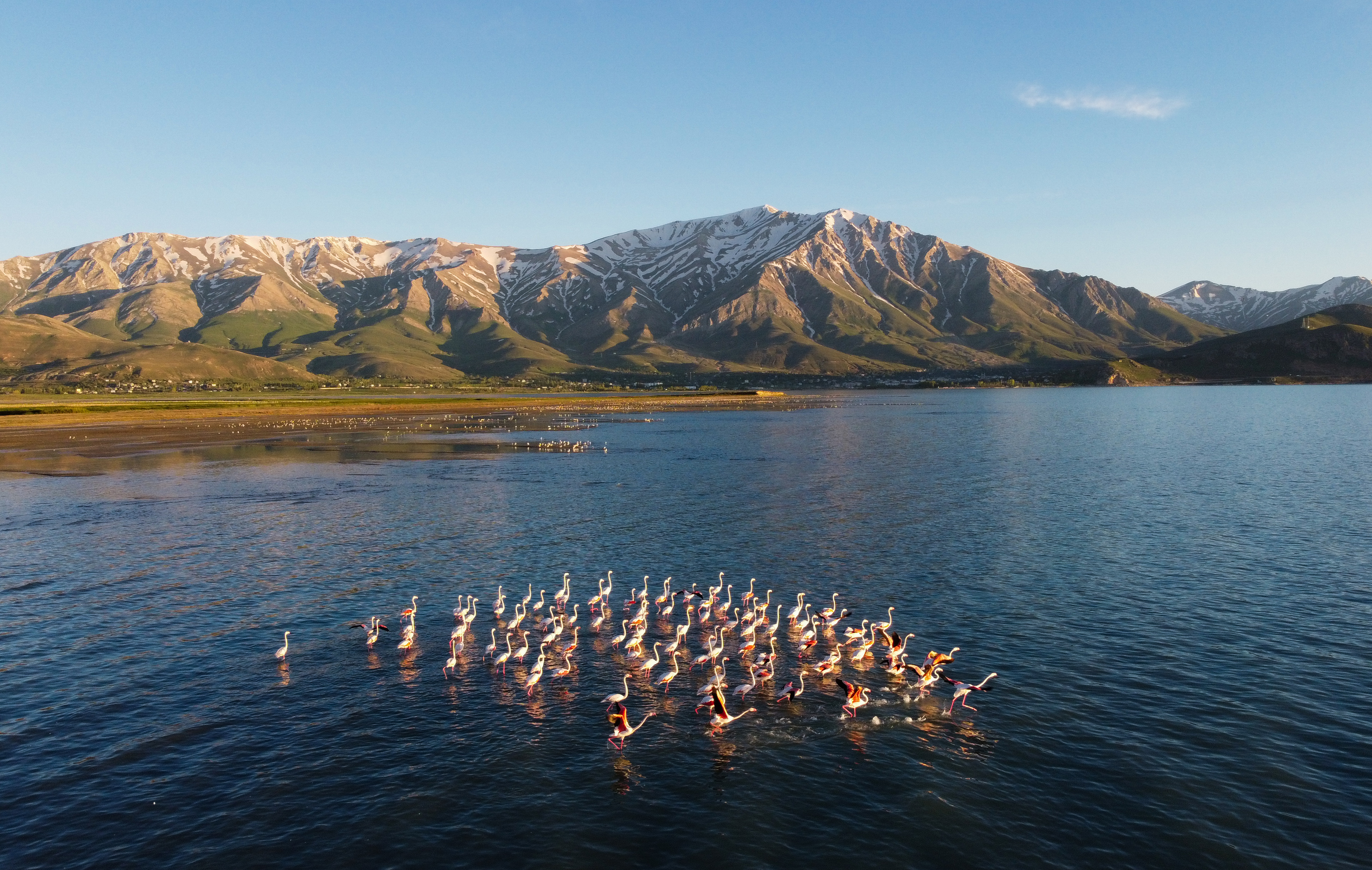
Mount Artos and flamingos.

It is around 38 kilometers from Van and around 10 kilometers from Lake Van.

== Geography and Geology ==
Mount Artos rises to an elevation of 3,550 meters (11,647 feet) and is recognized as an extinct volcano. The mountain's foundation consists of crystalline schists from the Paleozoic era, approximately 570-225 million years old. Its geological composition includes schist and limestone, formed between the end of the Tertiary period and the Quaternary period around 2.5 million years ago. The mountain's formation was accompanied by the development of surrounding valleys.
