= Siege of Van (1548) =

Siege in the Ottoman-Safavid War

- Part of the Ottoman–Safavid War (1532–55) within Ottoman–Persian Wars
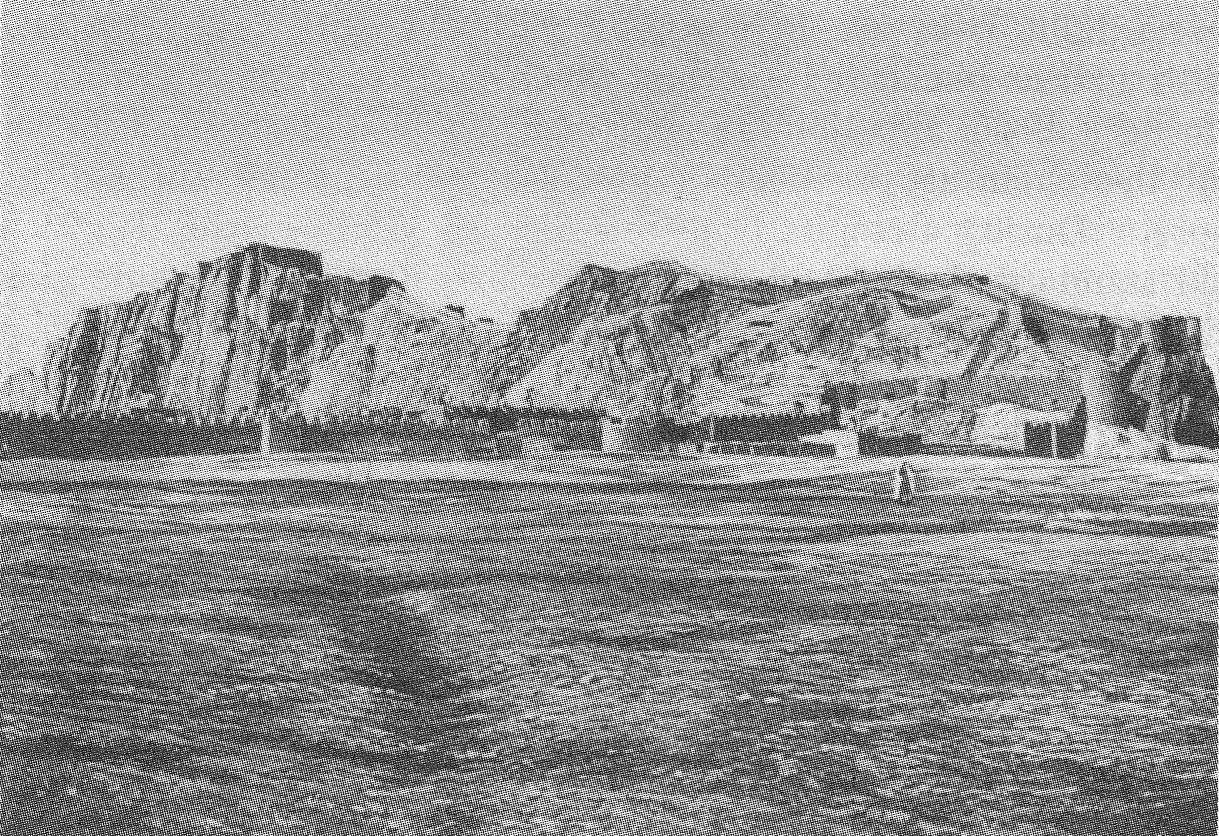
- The walled city of Van
Date	25 August 1548
Location	Van, Safavid Iran
Result	Ottoman victory

Belligerents
Safavid Iran	Ottoman Empire

Commanders and leaders
Tahmasp I	Suleiman I Rüstem Pasha; Gabriel de Luetz d'Aramon

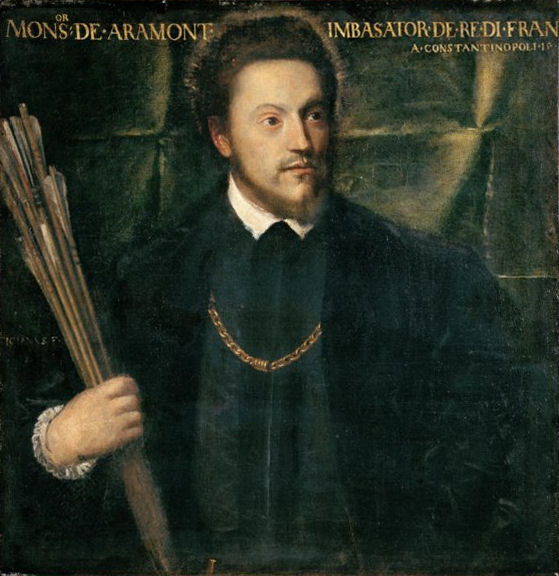
French ambassador Gabriel de Luetz d'Aramon participated in the Ottoman campaign.

The siege of Van occurred in 1548 when Suleiman the Magnificent attacked Iran in his second campaign of the Ottoman-Safavid War (1532–1555).

The city of Van, which has long been strategically important in Eastern Anatolia, was surrounded, put under siege, and bombarded. On this campaign, Suleiman was accompanied by the French ambassador Gabriel de Luetz, since France wanted to maintain a good relation with the Ottoman Empire. Gabriel de Luetz was able to give decisive military advice to Suleiman, as when he advised on artillery placement during the siege.
