= Eastern Armenia =

Eastern part of the Armenian Highlands

Eastern Armenia Արևելյան Հայաստան Arevelyan Hayastan
- 387–1991
- Capital: Various (Artashat, Dvin, Yerevan)
- Other languages: Classical Armenian, Eastern Armenian
- Religion: Armenian Apostolic Church
- Historical era: Antiquity – Modern Era
  - First partition of Armenia: 387
  - Independence of Armenia: 1991
- Today part of: Armenia; Azerbaijan (Armenian population left)

Eastern Armenia (Armenian: Արևելյան Հայաստան, Arevelyan Hayastan) is the eastern portion of the Armenian Highlands, historically inhabited by the Armenian people. Throughout history, Eastern Armenia has been contested and ruled by various foreign powers, including the Sasanian, Arab Caliphates, Safavid and Qajar Persia, the Russian Empire, and the Soviet Union. Today, it forms the core of the independent Republic of Armenia and comprises about 10% of the Armenian homeland today.

The term gained more precise meaning after the 17th century, particularly following the Treaty of Zuhab (1639), which formalized the division of Armenian territories between the Ottoman Empire (Western Armenia) and Persia (Eastern Armenia). This distinction was reinforced in the 19th century with the Russian Empire’s annexation of Persian-controlled Eastern Armenian lands.

== Historical partitions of Armenia ==
Armenia was divided four major times during the medieval and early modern periods:

- First Partition (387): Peace of Acilisene between the Sasanian and Byzantine Empires
- Second Partition (591): Reinforcement of the earlier division after the Byzantine–Sasanian War of 572–591
- Third Partition (1555): Treaty of Amasya between Safavids and Ottomans
- Fourth Partition (1639): Treaty of Zuhab established lasting Persian-Ottoman borders

== Eastern Armenia under Sasanian Persia ==
=== First partition ===
Sasanian Armenia (a vassal state of the Persian Empire from 387, fully annexed in 428) came under Sasanian control after the Partition of Armenia between the Byzantine and Sasanian Empires. The division in 387 AD marked the beginning of Persian influence over Eastern Armenia, while the western half remained under Byzantine rule. Initially, the region was ruled by an Armenian Arsacid king under Persian suzerainty, but the Sasanian Empire abolished the Armenian monarchy in 428 and established direct rule through a marzpanate, governed by Persian-appointed marzpans (governors).

=== Second partition ===
Under Sasanian rule, Persia attempted to integrate Armenia into its imperial system by promoting Zoroastrianism, which led to resistance from Armenian nobles and clergy. One of the most defining moments of this struggle was the Battle of Avarayr (451 AD), where Armenian forces, led by Vardan Mamikonian, fought against the Persian army to defend their Christian faith. Though the battle resulted in an Armenian defeat, Persia later recognized Armenia’s right to practice Christianity, securing its religious autonomy despite continued Sasanian control.

== Eastern Armenia under Arab rule (7th–9th centuries) ==
Following the fall of the Sasanian Empire in the mid-7th century, Eastern Armenia came under the control of the Arab Caliphate. The region was incorporated into the Umayyad and later the Abbasid Caliphates as part of the Emirate of Armenia. While Arabs imposed Islamic governance, Armenian nobles retained some autonomy through the nakharar system. Periodic rebellions occurred due to heavy taxation and religious pressures, but the Armenian Church remained active, and literary activity continued in monasteries.

== Eastern Armenia under Safavid Persia ==
=== Third partition ===
Iranian Armenia (1502–1813/1828) refers to the period when Eastern Armenia was under Persian rule, specifically the Safavid Empire (1502–1736), the Afsharid Dynasty (1736–1796), and the Qajar Dynasty (1796–1828). The Third Partition of Armenia occurred in 1555, when the Safavid Empire and the Ottoman Empire officially divided Armenian territories under the Treaty of Amasya. As a result, Western Armenia, including Lesser Armenia and the western provinces of Greater Armenia—Aghdznik, Tsopk, Upper Armenia, Turuberan, and Tayk—fell under Ottoman rule, while Eastern Armenia remained under Persian control. This division established a geopolitical boundary that persisted for centuries, with Eastern Armenia forming the core of historical Armenia within the Armenian Highlands, covering nearly 50% of the former Kingdom of Greater Armenia.

Throughout this time, Eastern Armenia was a battleground between Persia and the Ottoman Empire, suffering repeated invasions, forced displacements, and economic instability. One of the most devastating events was in 1604, when Shah Abbas I ordered the forced deportation of over 250,000 Armenians from their homeland to Persia, relocating them to New Julfa in Isfahan. While this severely depopulated Eastern Armenia, it strengthened Armenian trade networks within Persia, making Armenians key players in the Persian economy.

=== Fourth partition ===
The Treaty of Zuhab (1639) formally divided Armenia between the Persian and Ottoman Empires, establishing a long-lasting border. Eastern Armenia remained under Persian control and was divided into two major administrative regions: Chukhur-i Sa‘ad, which included Erevan and Nakhichevan, and Karabakh, governed by Persian-appointed khans. However, in Karabakh, Armenian meliks (princes) retained some degree of local autonomy and maintained their Christian identity despite Muslim rule. By the 18th century, Persian control had weakened, and Armenian leaders in Karabakh and Syunik actively sought Russian assistance to escape Persian and Ottoman domination.

=== Russian annexation ===
The Russo-Persian Wars (1804–1813, 1826–1828) led to the gradual transfer of Eastern Armenian lands from Iran to Russia. Russian control over Armenia persisted until 1917. Under the Treaty of Gulistan (1813), Russia gained control over Karabakh, Ganja, and other regions, marking the first major loss of Persian Armenia. The final blow came with the Treaty of Turkmenchai (1828), which ended Persian rule over Eastern Armenia, fully incorporating the region into the Russian Empire and reshaping its political and demographic landscape. Eastern Armenia came under the control of the Russian Empire in four phases between 1801 and 1878. However, the southern parts of Eastern Armenia remained under Persian (Iranian) rule, a division that continues to this day.

Eastern Armenia under Russian rule
Eastern Armenia under Russian control
Time Period	1801–1917
Empire	Russian Empire
Key Treaties	Treaty of Gulistan, Treaty of Turkmenchay
Regions Annexed	Karabakh, Syunik, Lori, Nakhichevan, Yerevan

==== First phase (1801) ====
On January 18, 1801, the Kingdom of Eastern Georgia (Kartli-Kakheti) was annexed by the Russian Empire, forming the Georgian Governorate. As a result, several Armenian territories that had previously been under Georgian rule also became part of Russia, including Lori, Utik, and parts of Shirak.

==== Second phase (1813 - Treaty of Gulistan) ====
The Treaty of Gulistan (1813) ended the Russo-Persian War (1804–1813) and transferred additional parts of Eastern Armenia to Russia. The key Armenian regions ceded to the Russian Empire included: Artsakh (Karabakh), Syunik (Zangezur), Utik, Paitakaran

==== Third phase (1828 - Treaty of Turkmenchai) ====
The Treaty of Turkmenchai (1828), which concluded the Russo-Persian War (1826–1828), resulted in further territorial gains for the Russian Empire. The following regions of Eastern Armenia were officially incorporated into Russia: Ararat Plain, Sevan, Kotayk, Nig, Pambak, Vayk, Sharur, Goghtn, Nakhichevan

This treaty also permitted the repatriation of over 40,000 Armenians from Persia back to Eastern Armenia, contributing to demographic shifts in the region.

==== Fourth phase (1878 - Russo-Turkish War) ====
After the Russo-Turkish War (1877–1878), Russia expanded further into Armenian territories previously under Ottoman rule. The Congress of Berlin granted Russia control over key Armenian regions: Kars Province, Batumi District

These territories historically included parts of Greater Armenia, such as: Vanand, Western Shirak. Yeraskhadzor-Arsharunik, Abegyanq-Gabegyanq, Havununik, Eastern Basen, Kogh, Javakhk, Parts of Tayk (Oltu-Ughtiq region), Western Gugark (including Artahan and Ardvin),

=== Extent of Russian-controlled Eastern Armenia ===
Following these annexations, Russian Armenia encompassed eight of the fifteen historic provinces of Greater Armenia: Ayrarat (almost entirely), Gugark, Syunik, Artsakh, Utik, Paitakaran, Parsahayk-Norshirakan, Eastern Vaspurakan.

In 1918, some of these territories became part of the First Republic of Armenia. However, after the fall of the First Republic in 1920, much of Eastern Armenia was absorbed into Soviet Armenia, while southern Eastern Armenia remained under Persian/Iranian control, where it remains today.

== Attempts to reunite Eastern and Western Armenia ==
Paris Peace Conference (1919)
Delegates	Aharonian, Nubar
Goal	Armenian unification
Outcome	No territorial gains

Treaty of Sèvres (1920)
Proposal	Wilsonian Armenia
Status	Never ratified
Replaced by	Treaty of Lausanne

During the 18th and 19th centuries, Armenian leaders and intellectuals sought to unify Eastern and Western Armenia. These efforts intensified after the Russian annexation of Eastern Armenia, as many Armenians hoped that Russia would eventually liberate Western Armenia from Ottoman rule. Appeals were made to the Russian Empire, particularly during the Russo-Turkish Wars, and Armenian volunteer fighters from Eastern Armenia joined the Russian army with the aim of national reunification.

During the Russo-Turkish War of 1877–1878, Armenian hopes were temporarily raised as Russian forces occupied large portions of Western Armenia. The resulting Treaty of San Stefano initially promised reforms and protection for Armenians in Ottoman lands, but these provisions were later weakened at the Congress of Berlin. Despite this setback, the Armenian national movement continued advocating for unification and autonomy, with cultural societies, political organizations, and church leaders promoting a pan-Armenian identity.

World War I reignited these aspirations. The Russian army, supported by Armenian volunteer units, advanced into Western Armenia and briefly established control over key territories, including Van, Erzurum, and Bitlis. However, the Russian Revolution of 1917 and subsequent withdrawal of Russian forces dashed these hopes. The territories were retaken by the Ottomans, and unification was never achieved. Nevertheless, the dream of a united Armenia remained a core ideal in Armenian national consciousness throughout the 20th century.

== Modern Eastern Armenia (post-1991) ==
With the collapse of the Soviet Union in 1991, Eastern Armenia emerged as the Republic of Armenia. The early post-Soviet years were marked by economic hardship, regional conflict with Azerbaijan over Nagorno-Karabakh, and political instability. Despite these challenges, Eastern Armenia continued to develop its institutions, and the Eastern Armenian dialect remains the language register used in the country.

Post-independence Armenia transitioned from a centrally planned Soviet economy to a market-based system. This period saw major privatization, inflation, and emigration, but also the emergence of civil society and democratic movements. The 1994 ceasefire with Azerbaijan over Nagorno-Karabakh did not end tensions, and Armenia remained diplomatically and militarily aligned with Russia while also deepening ties with the European Union. The conflict ended with an agreement in 2025 after Azerbaijani regained control in 2023.

Culturally, Eastern Armenia retained many Russian influences in law, education, and public administration, but also experienced a revival of traditional Armenian identity, arts, and religion. The Armenian Apostolic Church regained a prominent public role, and Yerevan saw the growth of new cultural institutions and diaspora connections. The legacy of Persian and Russian rule continues to shape the country’s geopolitical orientation, with ongoing efforts to balance regional alliances and maintain national sovereignty.
