= Treaty of Zuhab =

Ottoman–Safavid treaty (1639)

Treaty of Zuhab
1639
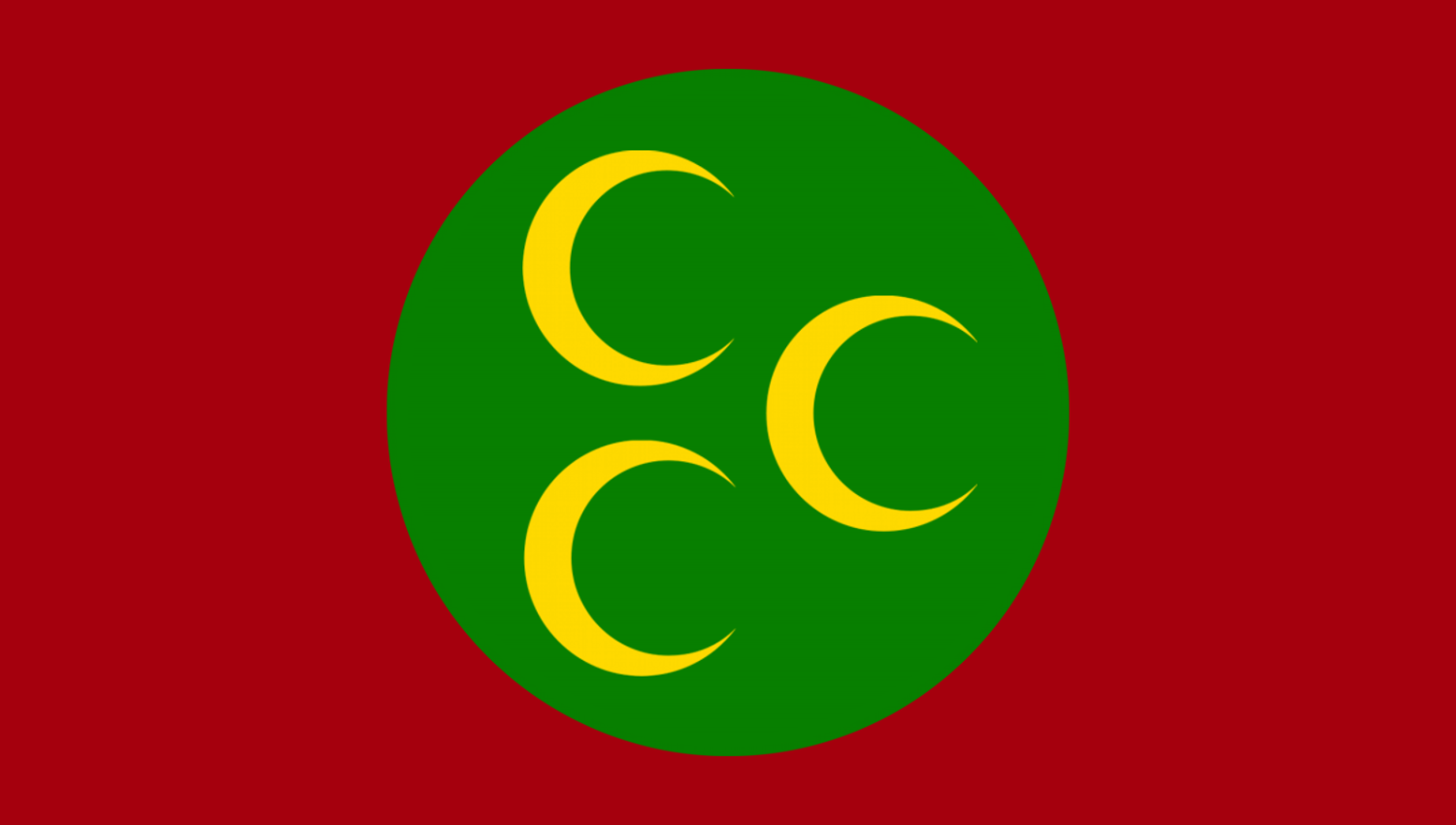
The 1639 Peace Treaty of Zuhab was made between the Safavid Empire and the Ottoman Empire.

The Treaty of Zuhab (Persian: عهدنامه زهاب, romanized: Ahadnāmeh-ye Zuhab), also called Treaty of Qasr-e Shirin (Turkish: Kasr-ı Şirin Antlaşması), signed on 17 May 1639 at Qasr-e Shirin in western Iran, ended the Ottoman–Safavid War of 1623–1639. It strove to clarify territorial divisions and borders between the Safavid and Ottoman Empires, serving as an important document for future agreements.

== Overview ==
The Treaty was an accord signed between the Safavid Empire and the Ottoman Empire on 17 May 1639. The accord ended the Ottoman–Safavid War of 1623–1639 and was the last conflict in almost 150 years of intermittent wars between the two states over territorial disputes. It can roughly be seen as a confirmation of the previous Peace of Amasya from 1555.

The treaty confirmed the division of territories in West Asia previously held by the Safavids, such as the permanent partition of the Caucasus between the two powers, in which East Armenia, eastern Georgia, Dagestan, and Shirvan stayed under the control of the Safavid Empire, while western Georgia and most of Western Armenia came fully under Ottoman rule. It also included all of Mesopotamia (including Baghdad) being ceded to the Ottomans, forming Ottoman Iraq, as well as Safavid-controlled eastern Samtskhe (Meskheti), making Samtskhe in its entirety an Ottoman possession. With the Treaty of Zuhab, Eastern Armenia remained for more than eight decades under Safavid Rule, who separated it into two administrative regions: Erivan province and Karabakh province. However, the vagueness of the Treaty of Zuhab opened these negotiated regions to future contestations.

Nevertheless, border disputes between Iran and the Ottoman Empire did not end. Between 1555 and 1918, Iran and the Ottomans signed no less than 18 treaties that would re-address their disputed borders. The efforts to determine the exact demarcation using this treaty and other sources would begin during the 19th century, essentially laying out the rough outline for the frontier between modern day Iran and the states of Turkey and Iraq, which was the Ottoman–Iranian border until 1918, when the Ottoman Empire lost much of its territories in West Asia following their defeat in World War I. Nevertheless, according to Professor Ernest Tucker, the treaty can be seen as the "culmination" of a process of normalisation between the two that had commenced with the Peace of Amasya. As opposed to any other Ottoman–Safavid treaty, Zuhab proved to be more "resilient" and became a "point of departure" for almost all further agreements on a diplomatic level between the two neighbors.

== See also ==
- Safavid Empire
- Ottoman Empire
- Ottoman–Safavid relations
- History of Iran
- History of Turkey
- History of the Caucasus
- Iran–Iraq War
- List of treaties
- Treaty of Gulistan
- Treaty of Turkmenchay
- Gog and Magog

== Sources ==
- Floor, Willem (2001). Safavid Government Institutions. Costa Mesa, California: Mazda Publishers. ISBN 978-1568591353.
- Floor, Willem M. (2008). Titles and Emoluments in Safavid Iran: A Third Manual of Safavid Administration, by Mirza Naqi Nasiri. Washington, DC: Mage Publishers. ISBN 978-1933823232.
- Floor, Willem; Herzig, Edmund, eds. (2015). Iran and the World in the Safavid Age. I.B.Tauris. ISBN 978-1780769905.
- Kashani-Sabet, Firoozeh (1999). Frontier Fictions: Shaping the Iranian Nation, 1804-1946. Princeton: Princeton University Press, 1999. ISBN 978-0-691-00497-6.
- Matthee, Rudi (2012). Persia in Crisis: Safavid Decline and the Fall of Isfahan. I.B.Tauris. ISBN 978-1845117450.
- Somel, Selçuk Akşin, Historical Dictionary of the Ottoman Empire, Scarecrow Press Inc., 2003.
