= Peace of Amasya =

1555 treaty between Safavid Iran and the Ottoman Empire

Peace of Amasya
1555
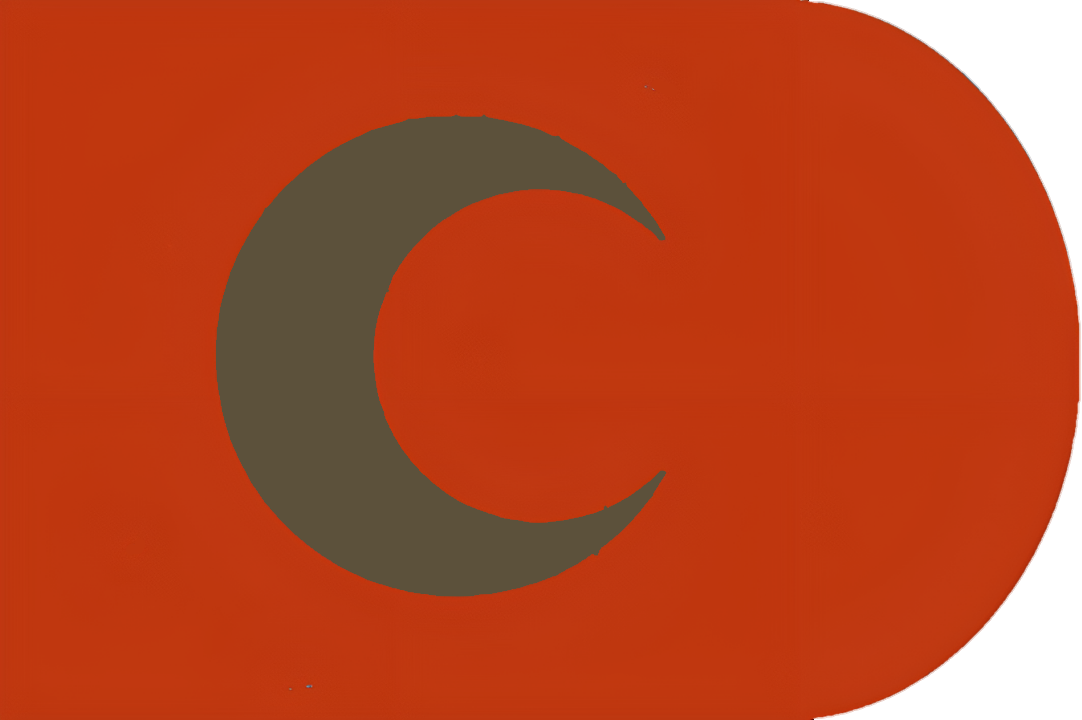

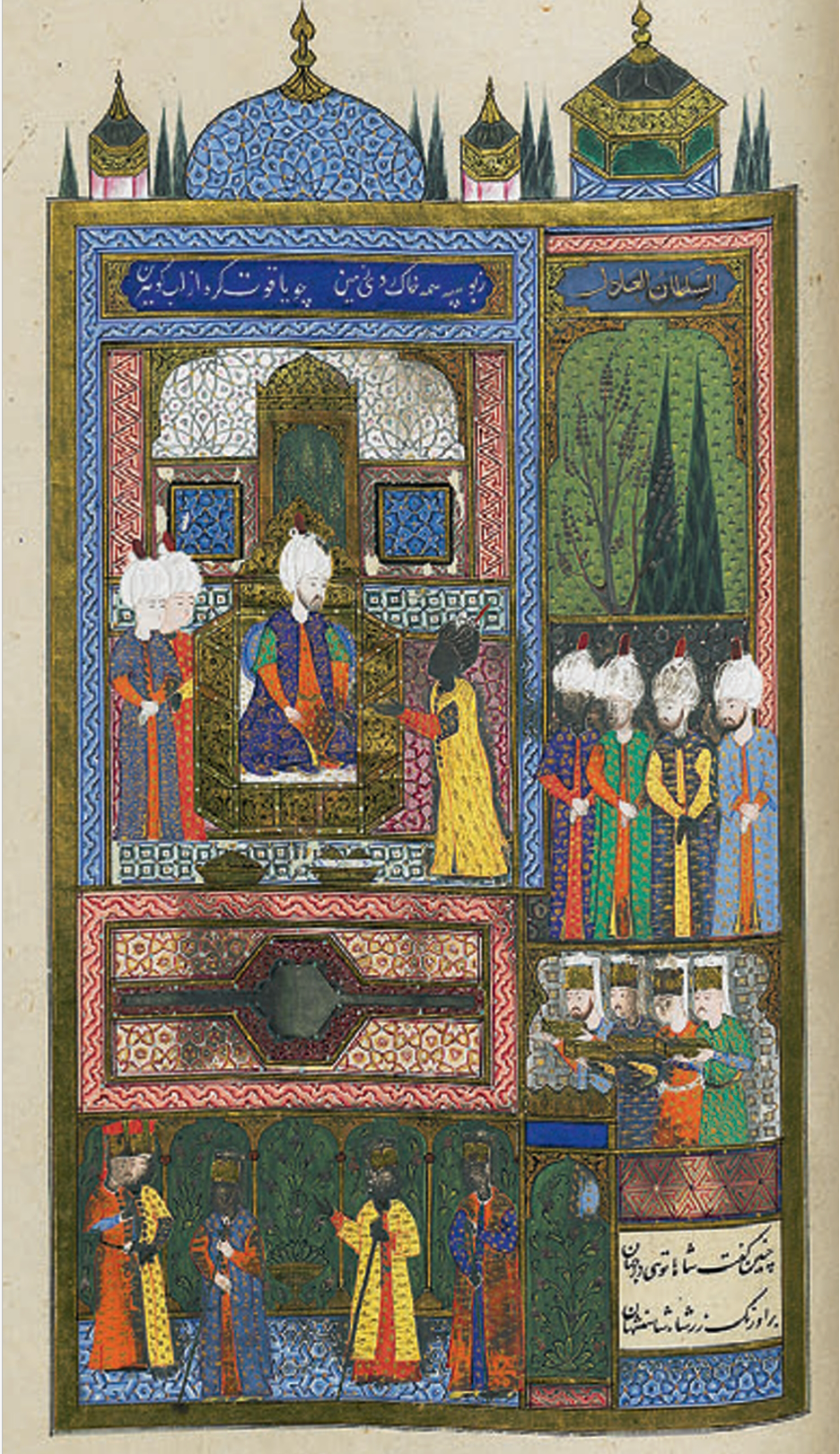
The reception of the Safavid envoy Farrukhzād Beg to Suleiman the Magnificent during the Treaty of Amasya. Süleymanname (1558)

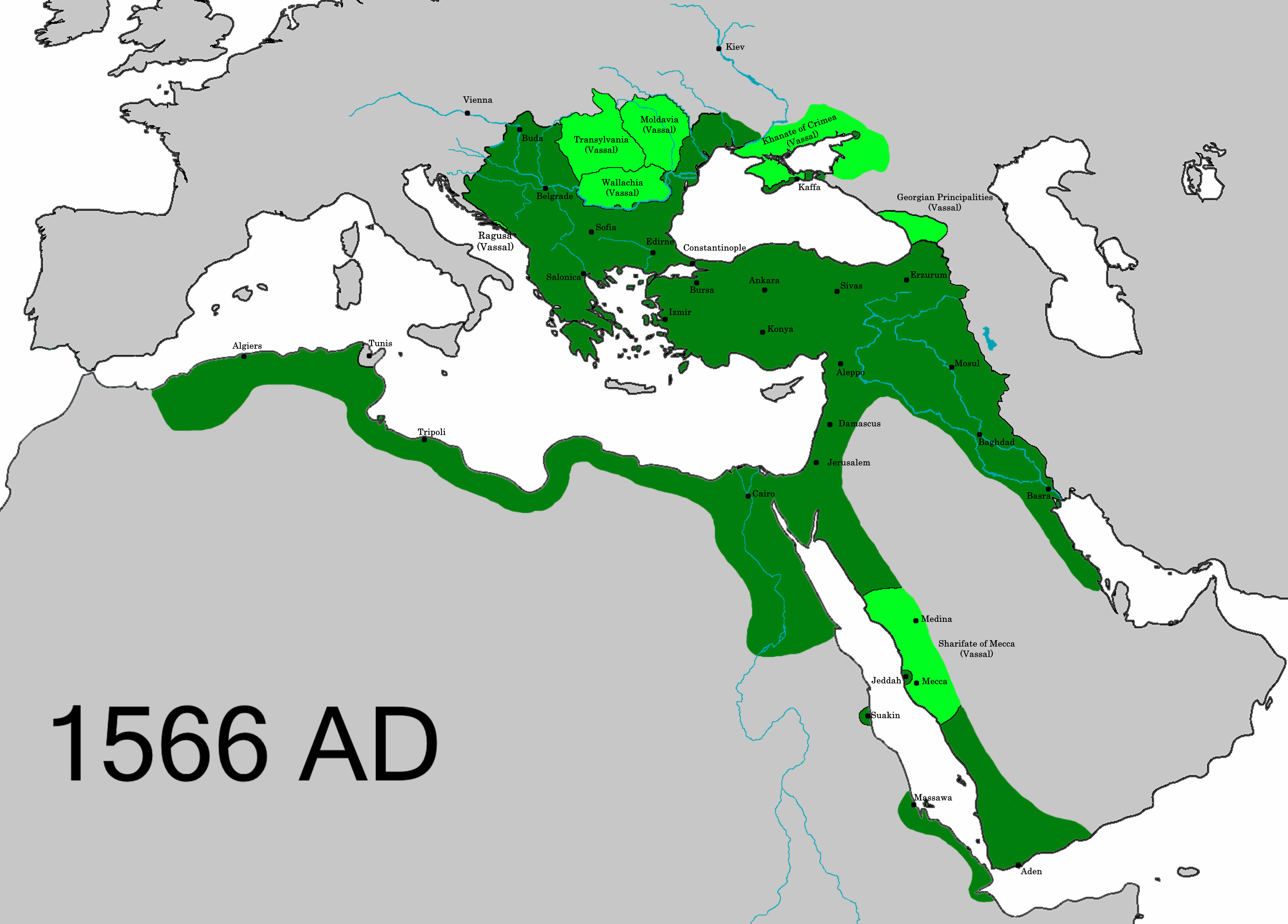
Suleiman's conquests in the Ottoman–Safavid War (1532–55) gave him access to the Persian Gulf and established a stable eastern border for the Ottoman Empire.

The Peace of Amasya (Persian: پیمان آماسیه, romanized: Peymān-e Amasiyeh; Turkish: Amasya Antlaşması) was a treaty agreed to on 29 May 1555, between Shah Tahmasp I of Safavid Iran and Sultan Suleiman the Magnificent of the Ottoman Empire at the city of Amasya, following the Ottoman–Safavid War of 1532–1555.

== Overview ==
The treaty defined the border between Iran and the Ottoman Empire and was followed by twenty years of peace. By this treaty, Armenia and Georgia were divided equally between the two, with Western Armenia and western Georgia (incl. western Samtskhe) falling in Ottoman hands while Eastern Armenia and eastern Georgia (incl. eastern Samtskhe) stayed in Iranian hands. The Ottoman Empire obtained most of Iraq, including Baghdad, which gave them access to the Persian Gulf, while the Persians retained their former capital Tabriz and all their other northwestern territories in the Caucasus and as they were prior to the wars, such as Dagestan and all of what is now Azerbaijan. The frontier thus established ran across the mountains dividing eastern and western Georgia (under native vassal princes), through Armenia, and via the western slopes of the Zagros Mountains down to the Persian Gulf.

Several buffer zones were established as well throughout Eastern Anatolia, such as in Erzurum, Shahrizor, and Van. Kars was declared neutral, and its existing fortress was destroyed.

The Ottomans, further, guaranteed access for Persian pilgrims to go to the Muslim holy cities of Mecca and Medina as well as to the Shia holy sites of pilgrimages in Ottoman Iraq.

The decisive parting of the Caucasus and the irrevocable ceding of Mesopotamia to the Ottomans happened per the next major peace treaty known as the Treaty of Zuhab in 1639 CE/AD.

Another term of the treaty was that the Safavids were required to end the ritual cursing of the first three Rashidun Caliphs, Aisha and other Sahaba (companions of Muhammad) — all held in high esteem by Sunnis. This condition was a common demand of Ottoman-Safavid treaties, and in this case was considered humiliating for Tahmasp.
