= Hümaşah Sultan (daughter of Şehzade Mehmed) =

Ottoman princess (1543–1582)

- Born: c. 1543; Manisa, Ottoman Empire (now Manisa, Turkey)
- Died: c. 1582 (aged 38–39); Constantinople, Ottoman Empire (now Istanbul, Turkey)
- Burial: Şehzade Mosque, Istanbul
- Spouse: Ferhad Pasha (m. 1566; died 1575) Lala Kara Mustafa Pasha (m. 1575; died 1580) Gazi Mehmed Pasha (m. 1581; died 1581)
- Issue: see below
- Dynasty: Ottoman
- Father: Şehzade Mehmed
- Mother: Aya Hatun
- Religion: Sunni Islam

Hümaşah Sultan (Ottoman Turkish: هماشاہ سلطان; c. 1543 – c. 1582) also known as Hüma Sultan, was an Ottoman princess, the daughter of Şehzade Mehmed (1521–1543) and the granddaughter of Sultan Suleiman the Magnificent of the Ottoman Empire, and his favourite consort and legal wife Hurrem Sultan.

== Early life ==
Hümaşah Sultan was born in Manisa in 1543, where her father Şehzade Mehmed served as sanjakbey. He was the eldest child of Suleiman the Magnificent and his consort Hürrem Sultan. She was her father’s only child, and her mother was a concubine, Aya Hatun. Following her father's death in 1543, shortly after her own birth, she was taken under the care of her grandmother Hürrem Sultan and moved to Constantinople.

Like her cousin Ayşe Hümaşah Sultan, daughter of Mihrimah Sultan (younger sister of Hümaşah's father), she was reportedly beloved by their grandfather, Sultan Suleiman, with whom she kept correspondence. Hümaşah, her cousin Ayşe, and her aunt Mihrimah would all imitate the communication style ushered in by her grandmother Hürrem, whose letters to the Sultan are known for their colourfulness, charm, and smoothness.

She is regarded by historian Mustafa Çağatay Uluçay as one of the most influential women in the later years of Suleiman's reign. In 1563, she presented her cousin Şehzade Murad (future Sultan Murad III) with a concubine, who would go on to be Safiye Sultan.

== Marriages ==
=== First marriage ===
Hümaşah's first husband was Ferhad Pasha. He had previously served as second Kapıcıbaşı. In 1553, he became the Agha of the Janissaries. In 1557-8, he was made the governor of Kastamonu Sanjak, and in 1564, he was made the third vizier. The marriage took place in 1566 in the Old Palace. The groom, in compliance with the law, walked on foot to the corner of the Old Palace with a scepter in his hand. Their palace was located in the precincts of the Old Palace and Bayezid II Mosque. The two together had four sons and five daughters, Hümaşah was widowed at Ferhad's death on 6 February 1575.

=== Second marriage ===
On 25 August 1575, six months after the death of Ferhad Pasha, Hümaşah married Lala Mustafa Pasha. Mustafa had been the tutor of her uncle, Sultan Selim II. She was his second wife. The two together had one son, Sultanzade Abdülbaki Bey. She was widowed when her husband died on 7 August 1580.

=== Third marriage ===
In 1581, Hümaşah married the governor of Shahrizor Eyalet, Mehmed Pasha, the brother of the grand vizier Damat Ibrahim Pasha. He died in August 1581.

== Death ==
She died in 1582, and was buried alongside her father and uncle, Şehzade Cihangir, in Şehzade Mosque. She had a provision made, supported by vakfs, that is, charitable foundations, so that the Quran would be read for the sake of her soul.

== Issue ==
Humaşah had four sons and five daughters by her first marriage with Ferhad Pasha:

- Fatma Hanımsultan (1567 – 29 June 1588, buried in the Şehzade Mosque); the eldest child of Hümaşah Sultan, known also as Fatma Sultan in the harem registers. She was also known as Fatima Khatun in some languages, as Khatun is a Turkic title equivalent to sultant which shares an etymology with hanim. She was married in 1584 to the sanjakbey of Kastamonu Mehmed Bey (died August 1586), son of Mustafa Pasha, and the brother of grand vizier Damat Ibrahim Pasha, from whom she had a son, Hacı Pasha, who served as the beylerbey of Manisa.
- Sultanzade Mustafa Mehmed Bey (1569–1593); sanjakbey of Belgrade, calligrapher. He had a son, Süleyman Bey, who died in 1655. (died 1613, buried beside his father in his mausoleum in Eyüp);
- Sultanzade Osman Bey (1571–1626); sanjakbey of Bolu.
- Sultanzade Ibrahim Bey; died in 1601. He had a son, Mustafa Pasha, governor of Bosnia, who died in 1636.
- Sultanzade Hüseyin Bey.
- Hatice Hanımsultan (buried in the Şehzade Mosque). She married Mustafa Bey, sanjak bey of Kastamonu in 1577, and had issue.
- Three unnamed daughters.

She had a son by her second marriage with Lala Kara Mustafa Pasha:

- Sultanzade Abdülbaki Bey, who married Safiye Hanımsultan, daughter of his mother's cousin Ismihan Sultan (daughter of Sultan Selim II and Nurbanu Sultan)

== Bibliography ==
- Allahverdi, Reyhan Şahin (2016). An Orphan Sultan: Foundations of Şehzade Mehmed's Daughter Hümasah Sultan.
- Necipoğlu, Gülru (2005). The Age of Sinan: Architectural Culture in the Ottoman Empire. London: Reaktion Books. ISBN 978-1-86189-253-9.
- Pedani, M. P. (2000). "Safiye's Household and Venetian Diplomacy". Turcica. 32: 9–32. doi:10.2143/TURC.32.0.460.
- Peirce, Leslie Penn (1993). The Imperial Harem: Women and Sovereignty in the Ottoman Empire. Studies in Middle Eastern History. New York: Oxford University Press. ISBN 978-0-19-507673-8.
- Sakaoğlu, Necdet (2008). Bu mülkün kadın sultanları: Vâlide sultanlar, hâtunlar, hasekiler, kadınefendiler, sultanefendiler. Oğlak Yayıncılık. ISBN 978-9-753-29623-6.
- Tezcan, Hülya (2006). Osmanlı çocukları: şehzadeler ve hanım sultanların yaşlamarı ve giysileri. Istanbul: Aygaz Yayınları. ISBN 978-9-759-83723-5.
- Uluçay, M.Cağatay (1956). Harem'den mektuplar I. Vakit matbaasi. ISBN 978-9-75-437833-7.
