= Şehzade Mehmed =

Ottoman prince, son of Sultan Suleiman

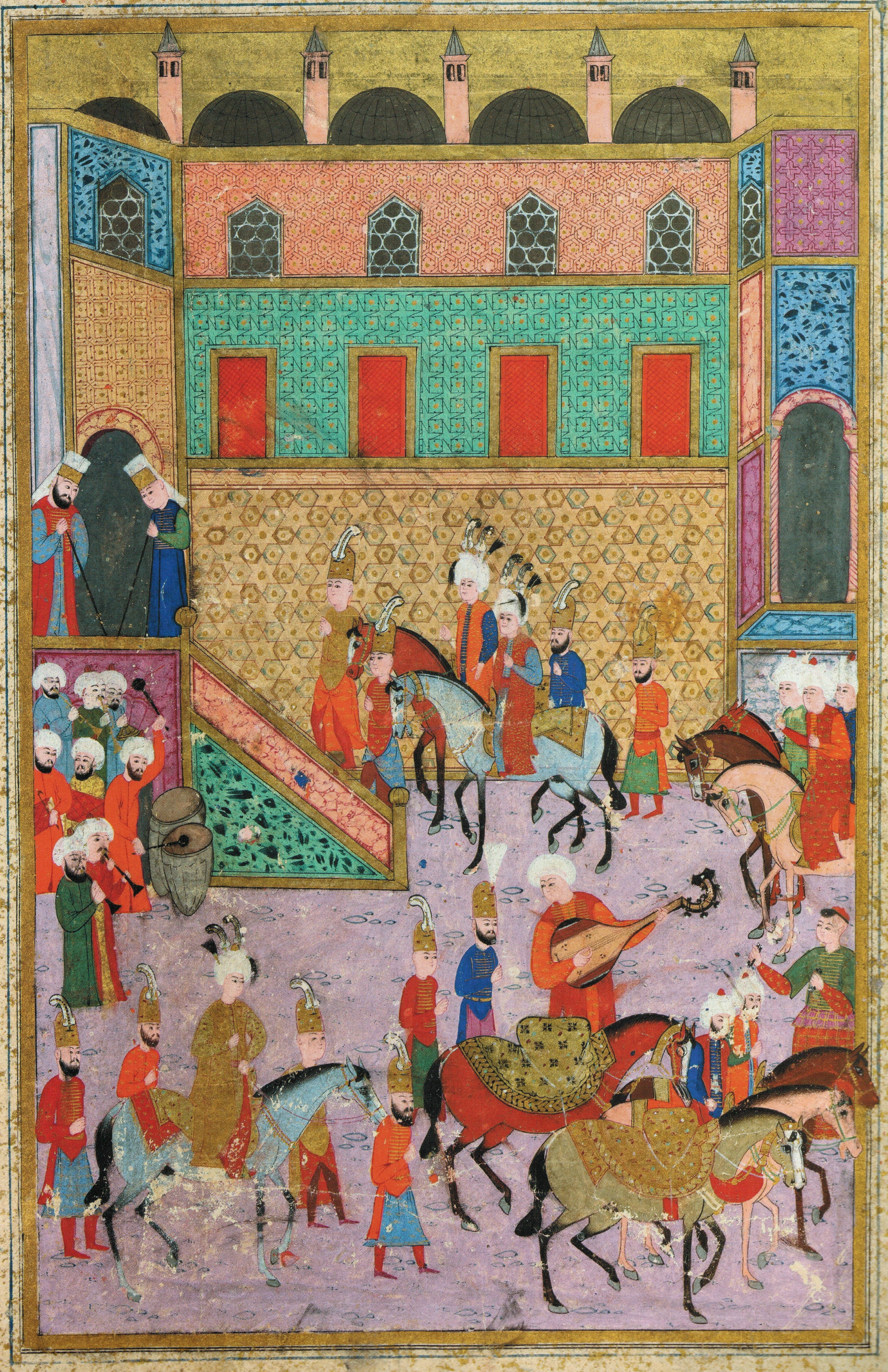
- Mehmed's circumcision, 1530

Governor of Manisa
- Tenure: 12 November 1542 – 7 November 1543
- Born: September 1522; Old Palace, Istanbul, Ottoman Empire
- Died: 7 November 1543 (aged 21); Manisa Palace, Manisa, Ottoman Empire
- Burial: Şehzade Mosque, Istanbul
- Consort: Aya Hatun
- Issue: Hümaşah Sultan
- Dynasty: Ottoman
- Father: Suleiman the Magnificent
- Mother: Hürrem Sultan
- Religion: Sunni Islam

Şehzade Mehmed (Ottoman Turkish: شاهزاده محمد; September 1522 – 7 November 1543) was an Ottoman prince, son of Sultan Suleiman the Magnificent and his wife Hürrem Sultan. He served as governor of Manisa until his death in 1543.

== Early life ==
Şehzade Mehmed was born in September 1522 and it is proposed that he was the twin of Mihrimah Sultan in the Old Palace, during Suleiman's campaign to Rhodes. His birth was celebrated in the camp with sacrifices and distribution of alms. His mother was Hürrem Sultan. In 1533 or 1534, his mother, Hurrem, was freed and became Suleiman's legal wife. He had four younger brothers, Şehzade Selim (future Selim II), Şehzade Abdullah, who died at the age of three years, Şehzade Bayezid, and Şehzade Cihangir, and a younger sister, Mihrimah Sultan.

In June–July 1530, a three-week celebration was organised in Constantinople that centered around the circumcision of Mehmed, and his brothers Mustafa, and Selim. The princes were circumcised on 27 June 1530. The festivities ranged from displays of captured enemy items to simulated battles, featuring performances by jugglers and strongmen, as well as reenactments of recent conflicts. Suleiman played a central role, observing everything from a loggia in the Hippodrome, while Pargalı Ibrahim Pasha actively oversaw the proceedings and presented gifts to the sultan and the princes.

== Career ==
In May 1533, Mustafa was appointed the governor of Manisa. Mehmed on the other hand remained in the capital. In May 1537, he and his brother Selim joined their father on his campaign to Corfu. This marked the inaugural military campaign of both of his sons. Their presence in a military campaign conveyed a message of dynastic continuity. In 1540, the sultan took him and Selim with him to spend the winter in Edirne. In June 1541, he and Selim once again accompanied their father on his campaign to Buda.

Suleiman loved and favoured Mehmed, and appointed him as heir contrary to the tradition. Soon after their return from Buda in October 1542, Suleiman, with Hürrem's influence, appointed him governor of Manisa. He also appointed Selim governor of Karaman. Prior to the appointment, Şehzade Mustafa was sent to Amasya on 16 June 1541. Mehmed began his duties formally as governor soon after his arrival to Manisa on 12 November 1542.

His mother, however, didn't accompany him to his provincial post. A Manisa register indicates that she did, however, visit Mehmed in 1543. The same year, she also visited her younger son, Prince Selim, in Karaman. His only child, Hümaşah Sultan was born in 1543 in Manisa.

Evliya Çelebi describes Mehmed as a "prince of more exquisite qualities than even Mustafa. He had a piercing intellect and a subtle judgment. Suleiman had intended that he would be his successor, but man proposes and God disposes".

== Death ==
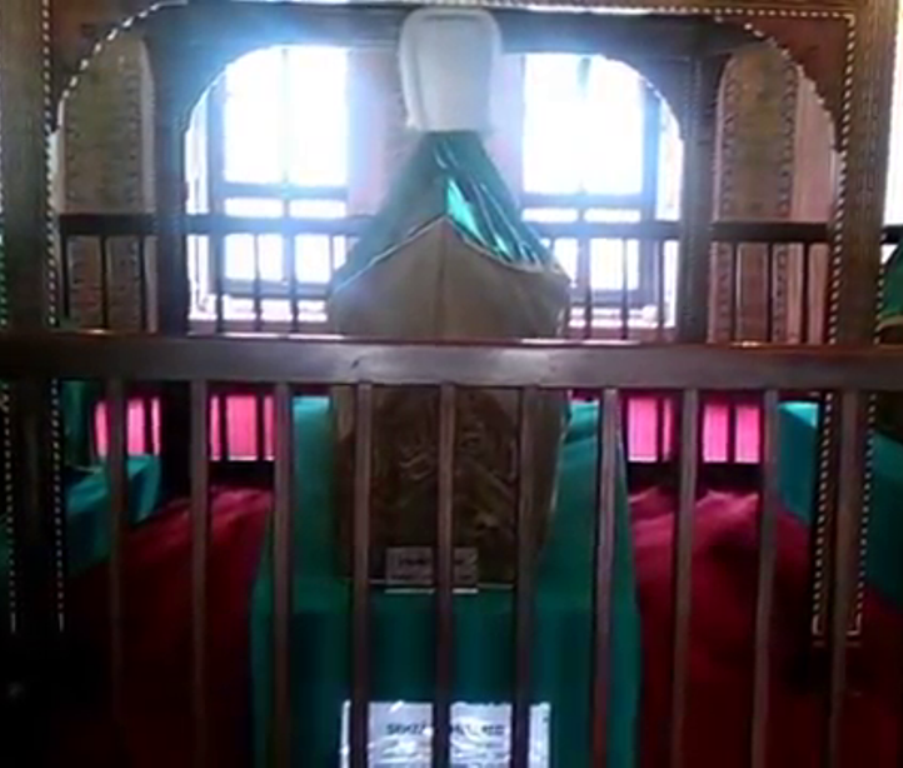
The tomb of Şehzade Mehmed inside Şehzade Mosque

Mehmed fell ill during the public festivities held in honor of his father's most recent military campaign in Manisa. He died shortly after, on 7 November 1543, probably of smallpox. The deceased prince's remains were transported from Manisa to Üsküdar by Lala Pasha, and Defterdar İbrahim Çelebi in the north, just across the sea from Constantinople, where a funeral procession was assembled. With solemnity, the prince's coffin was conveyed to the quay and crossed the Bosphorus to reach Constantinople. A sizable assembly, comprising scholars, religious elders, palace inhabitants, city residents, and the sultan himself, awaited the arrival. Subsequently, the augmented procession ascended the hill to the Bayezid II Mosque for the funeral prayer. After his death his younger brother Selim replaced him as the governor of Manisa.

After Mehmed's death, Suleiman had the famed imperial architect Mimar Sinan build the Şehzade Mosque in Istanbul to commemorate Mehmed. Also, Suleiman composed an elegy for Mehmed and ended the poem with the line "Most distinguished of the princes, my Sultan Mehmed". Suleiman commissioned the construction of a complex, comprising a mausoleum, a soup kitchen, a mosque, and a madrasa, dedicated to Mehmed.

== Issue ==
Şehzade Mehmed had an only child, a daughter:

- Hümaşah Sultan (1543–1582). Also called Hüma Sultan. She was born in Manisa shortly before her father's death and was raised in Constantinople by her grandmother Hürrem. She married three times and had five sons and five daughters. Her mother was a concubine named Aya Hatun.

== In popular culture ==
- In the 2003 TV miniseries Hürrem Sultan, Şehzade Mehmed was played by Turkish actor Sezgi Mengi.
- In the 2011–2014 TV series Muhteşem Yüzyıl, (Magnificent Century) Şehzade Mehmed is portrayed by Turkish actor Gürbey İleri (main) in the third season, and Arda Anarat (supporting) in the second and third season.

== Bibliography ==
- Peirce, Leslie P. (1993). The imperial harem : women and sovereignty in the Ottoman Empire. New York. ISBN 0-19-507673-7. OCLC 27811454.
- Sağır, Yusuf (2016). According to the Records and Vakfiyye's the Foundation of Şehzade Mehmet.
- Şahin, K. (2023). Peerless Among Princes: The Life and Times of Sultan Süleyman. Oxford University Press. ISBN 978-0-19-753163-1.
- Yermolenko, Galina (April 2005). Roxolana: "The Greatest Empresse of the East. DeSales University, Center Valley, Pennsylvania.
