= Suleiman the Magnificent =

Sultan of the Ottoman Empire from 1520 to 1566

Suleiman I
- Custodian of the Two Holy Mosques; Shah of Baghdad in Iraq; Sultan of Egypt; Caesar of Rome; Khagan
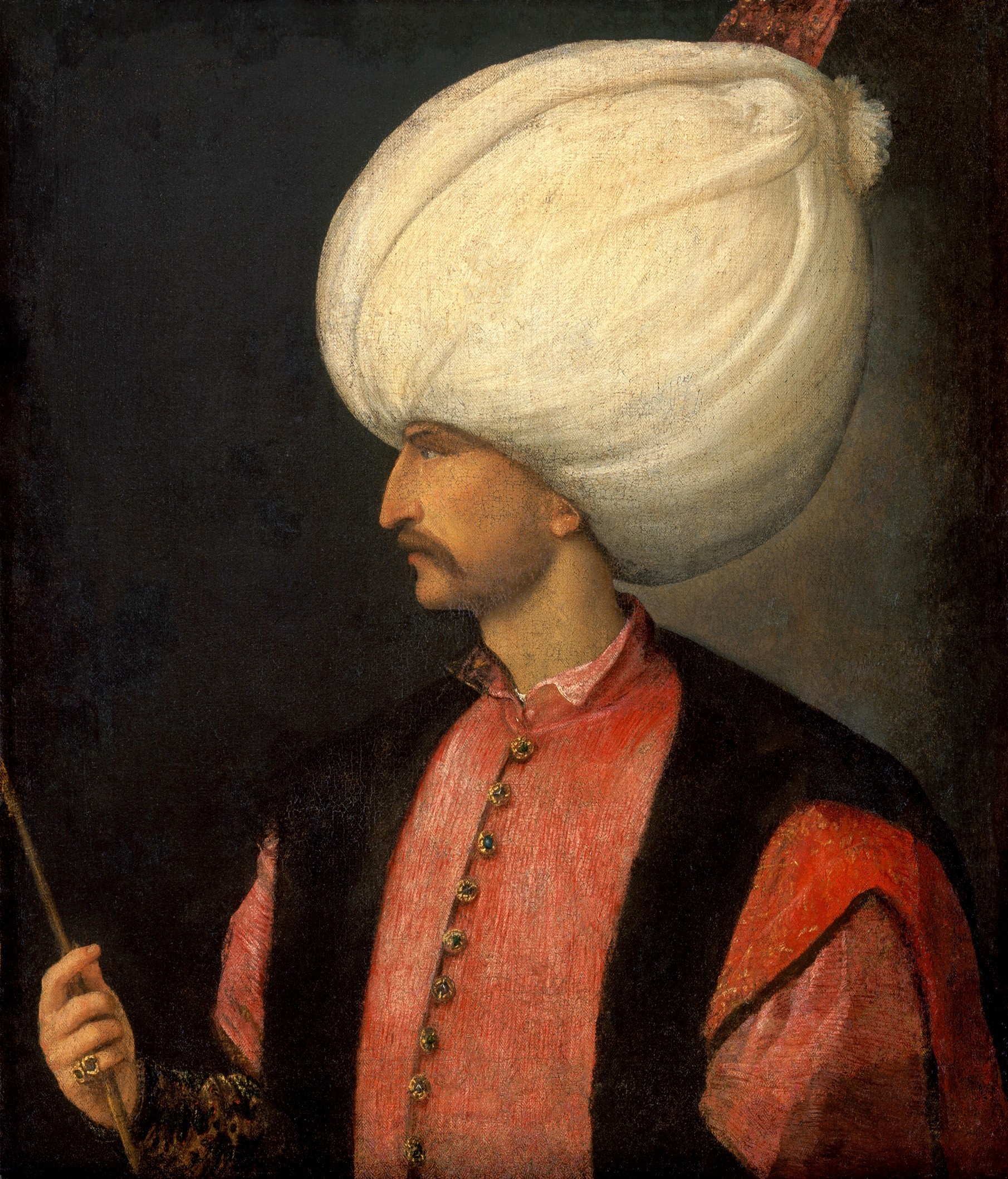
- Portrait attributed to circle of Titian and dated to after 1543

Sultan of the Ottoman Empire (Padishah)
- Reign: 30 September 1520 – 6 September 1566
- Predecessor: Selim I
- Successor: Selim II

Ottoman caliph (Amir al-Mu'minin)
- Predecessor: Selim I
- Successor: Selim II
- Born: 6 November 1494; Trabzon, Trabzon Eyalet, Ottoman Empire
- Died: 6 September 1566 (aged 71); Szigetvár, Kingdom of Hungary
- Burial: Organs buried at Turbék, Szigetvár, Hungary; Body buried at Süleymaniye Mosque, Istanbul, Turkey
- Consorts: Hürrem Sultan (m. 1534; died 1558) Mahidevran Hatun
- Issue: Şehzade Mahmud; Şehzade Murad; Şehzade Mustafa; Raziye Sultan; Şehzade Mehmed; Mihrimah Sultan; Selim II; Şehzade Abdullah; Şehzade Bayezid; Şehzade Cihangir
Names
- Süleyman Şah bin Selim Şah Han
- Dynasty: Ottoman
- Father: Selim I
- Mother: Hafsa Sultan
- Religion: Sunni Islam
- Tughra

Suleiman I (Note: Ottoman Turkish: سلیمان اول, romanized: Süleymân-ı Evvel; Turkish: I. Süleyman, IPA: [biɾinˈdʒi sylejˈman]; 6 November 1494) (6 November 1494 – 6 September 1566), commonly known as Suleiman the Magnificent, was the Ottoman sultan from 1520 to 1566. The longest reign among the Ottoman sultans, his rule brought about a notable peak in the Ottoman Empire's economic, military and political power, and raised the number of the empire's subjects to at least 25 million people.

After succeeding his father Selim I on 30 September 1520, Suleiman began his reign by launching military campaigns against the Christian powers of Central and Eastern Europe and the Mediterranean; Belgrade fell to him in 1521 and Rhodes in 1522, and at Mohács in 1526, Suleiman broke the strength of the Kingdom of Hungary. Hungary was subsequently divided, with much of it incorporated directly into the empire. However, his defeat at the siege of Vienna in 1529 prevented him from advancing further into Europe. Suleiman also fought for years against the Shia Islamic Safavid Empire of Iran and annexed Iraq. In North Africa, Ottoman Tripolitania was established and the Ottoman fleet dominated the seas from the Mediterranean to the Red Sea and into the Persian Gulf.

Suleiman personally instituted major judicial changes pertaining to society, education, taxation, and criminal law. His reforms, carried out in conjunction with the Ottoman chief judicial official Ebussuud Efendi, brought together the two forms of Ottoman law: sultanic (Kanun) and Islamic (Sharia). He was also a distinguished poet and goldsmith; and a great patron of fine culture, overseeing the "Golden Age" of the Ottoman Empire which was at the height of its artistic, literary, and architectural development.

In 1534, Suleiman broke with Ottoman tradition by marrying Hürrem, an influential woman from his Imperial Harem who helped usher in the "Sultanate of Women" period in Ottoman history. Upon Suleiman's death in 1566, he was succeeded by his and Hürrem's son Selim II. The death of Suleiman marks a watershed moment in Ottoman history, although scholars typically regard the period after his death to be one of crisis and adaptation rather than of simple decline. In the following decades, the Ottoman Empire began to experience significant political, institutional, and economic changes, a period often referred to as the Era of Transformation.

== Alternative names and titles ==
He was known as Suleiman the Magnificent in the West.

It is unclear when exactly the term Kanûnî (the Lawgiver) first came to be used as an epithet for Suleiman. It is entirely absent from sixteenth and seventeenth-century Ottoman sources and may date from the early 18th century.

There is a tradition of Western origin, according to which Suleiman the Magnificent was "Suleiman II", but that tradition has been based on an erroneous assumption that Süleyman Çelebi was to be recognised as a legitimate sultan.

== Early life ==
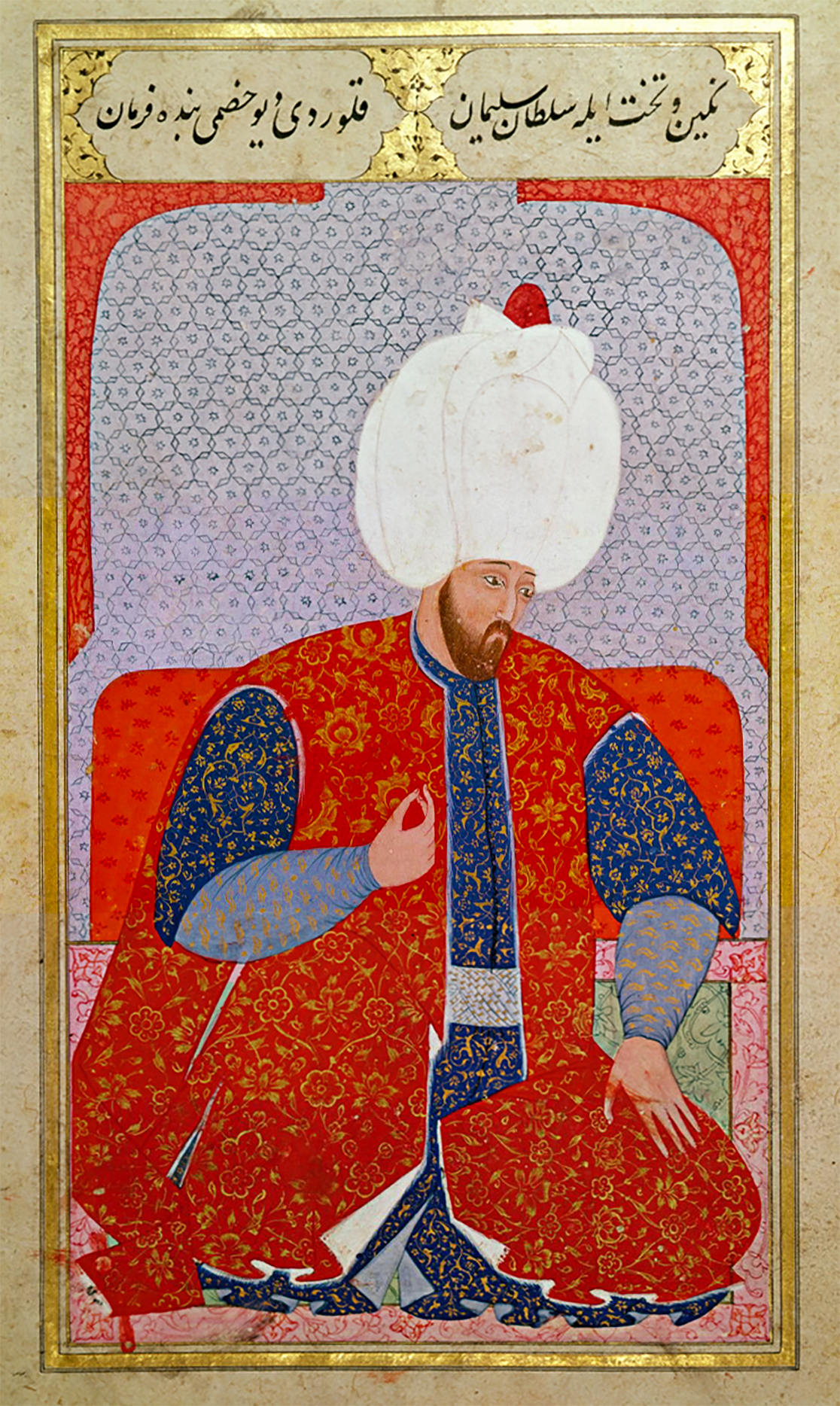
Suleiman by Nakkaş Osman (painted in 1579)

Suleiman was born in Trabzon on the southern coast of the Black Sea to Şehzade Selim (later Selim I), probably on 6 November 1494, although this date is not known with absolute certainty or evidence. His mother was Hafsa Sultan, a concubine convert to Islam of unknown origins, who died in 1534. At the age of seven, Suleiman began studies of science, history, literature, theology and military tactics in the schools of the imperial Topkapı Palace in Constantinople. As a young man, he befriended Pargalı Ibrahim, a Greek slave who later became one of his most trusted advisers (but who was later executed on Suleiman's orders). At age seventeen, he was appointed as the governor of first Kaffa (Theodosia), then Manisa, with a brief tenure at Edirne.

=== Accession ===
Upon the death of his father, Selim I (r. 1512–1520), Suleiman entered Constantinople and ascended to the throne as the tenth Ottoman sultan. An early description of Suleiman, a few weeks following his accession, was provided by the Venetian envoy Bartolomeo Contarini:

The sultan is only twenty-five years [actually 26] old, tall and slender but tough, with a thin and bony face. Facial hair is evident, but only barely. The sultan appears friendly and in good humor. Rumor has it that Suleiman is aptly named, enjoys reading, is knowledgeable and shows good judgment."

== Military campaigns ==
=== Conquests in Europe ===
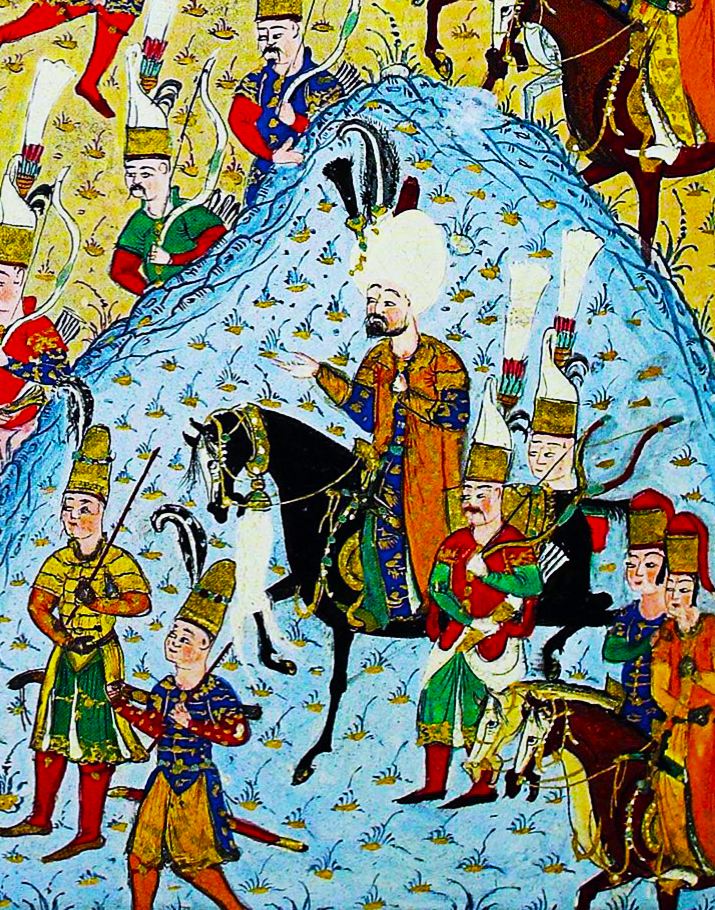
Suleiman during the siege of Rhodes in 1522

Upon succeeding his father, Suleiman began a series of military conquests, eventually leading to a revolt led by the Ottoman-appointed governor of Damascus in 1521. Suleiman soon made preparations for the conquest of Belgrade from the Kingdom of Hungary—something his great-grandfather Mehmed II had failed to achieve because of John Hunyadi's strong defense in the region. Its capture was vital in removing the Hungarians and Croats who, following the defeats of the Albanians, Bosniaks, Bulgarians, Byzantines and the Serbs, remained the only formidable force who could block further Ottoman gains in Europe. Suleiman encircled Belgrade on 28 August 1521, with 250,000 Turkish soldiers and over 100 ships, and began a series of heavy bombardments from an island in the Danube. Belgrade was made the seat of the Pashalik of Belgrade (also known as the Sanjak of Smederevo), and quickly became the second largest Ottoman town in Europe at over 100,000 people, surpassed only by Constantinople.

The road to Hungary and Austria lay open, but Suleiman turned his attention instead to the Eastern Mediterranean island of Rhodes, the home base of the Knights Hospitaller. Suleiman built a large fortification, Marmaris Castle, that served as a base for the Ottoman Navy. Following a five-month siege, Rhodes capitulated and Suleiman allowed the Knights of Rhodes to depart. The conquest of the island cost the Ottomans 50,000 to 60,000 dead from battle and sickness (Christian claims went as high as 64,000 Ottoman battle deaths and 50,000 disease deaths).

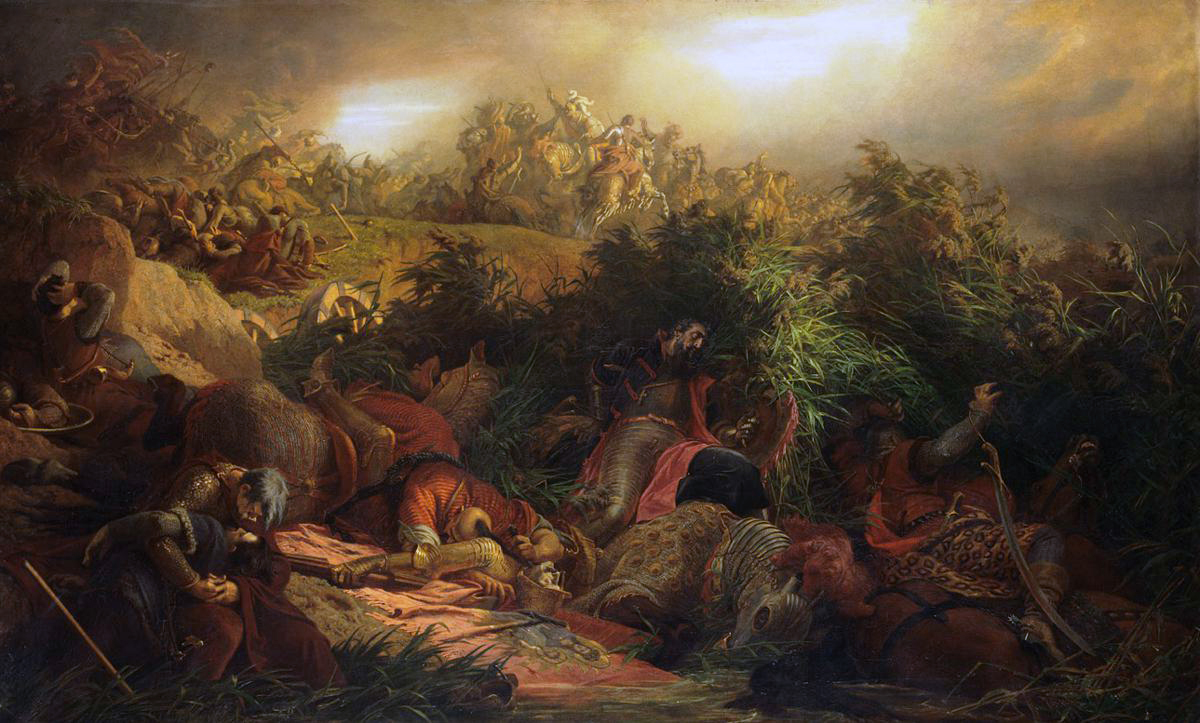
Battle of Mohacs by Bertalan Székely

As relations between Hungary and the Ottoman Empire deteriorated, Suleiman resumed his campaign in Central Europe, and on 29 August 1526 he defeated Louis II of Hungary (1506–1526) at the Battle of Mohács. The Hungarian army, encouraged by the nobility to engage prematurely, launched a frontal assault that collapsed under coordinated Ottoman counterattacks. King Louis and much of the Hungarian aristocracy were killed, resulting in the destruction of the royal army and the end of the Jagiellonian dynasty in Hungary and Bohemia. The aftermath saw the partition of Hungary between the Ottoman Empire, the Habsburg monarchy, and the Principality of Transylvania. The battle marked the beginning of sustained Ottoman–Habsburg wars and the decline of Hungary as an independent power. Upon encountering the lifeless body of King Louis, Suleiman is said to have lamented: "I came indeed in arms against him; but it was not my wish that he should be thus cut off before he scarcely tasted the sweets of life and royalty." While Suleiman was campaigning in Hungary, Turkmen tribes in central Anatolia (in Cilicia) revolted under the leadership of Kalender Çelebi.

Some Hungarian nobles proposed that Ferdinand, who was the ruler of neighboring Austria and tied to Louis II's family by marriage, be King of Hungary, citing previous agreements that the Habsburgs would take the Hungarian throne if Louis died without heirs. However, other nobles turned to the nobleman John Zápolya, whom Suleiman supported. Under Charles V and his brother Ferdinand I, the Habsburgs reoccupied Buda and took possession of Hungary. Reacting in 1529, Suleiman marched through the valley of the Danube and regained control of Buda; in the following autumn, his forces laid siege to Vienna. This was to be the Ottoman Empire's most ambitious expedition and the apogee of its drive to the West. With a reinforced garrison of 16,000 men, the Austrians inflicted the first defeat on Suleiman, sowing the seeds of a bitter Ottoman–Habsburg rivalry that lasted until the 20th century. His second attempt to conquer Vienna failed in 1532, as Ottoman forces were delayed by the siege of Güns and failed to reach Vienna. In both cases, the Ottoman army was plagued by bad weather, forcing them to leave behind essential siege equipment, and was hobbled by overstretched supply lines. In 1533 the Treaty of Constantinople was signed by Ferdinand I, in which he acknowledged Ottoman suzerainty and recognised Suleiman as his "father and suzerain". He also agreed to pay an annual tribute and accepted the Ottoman grand vizier as his brother and equal in rank.

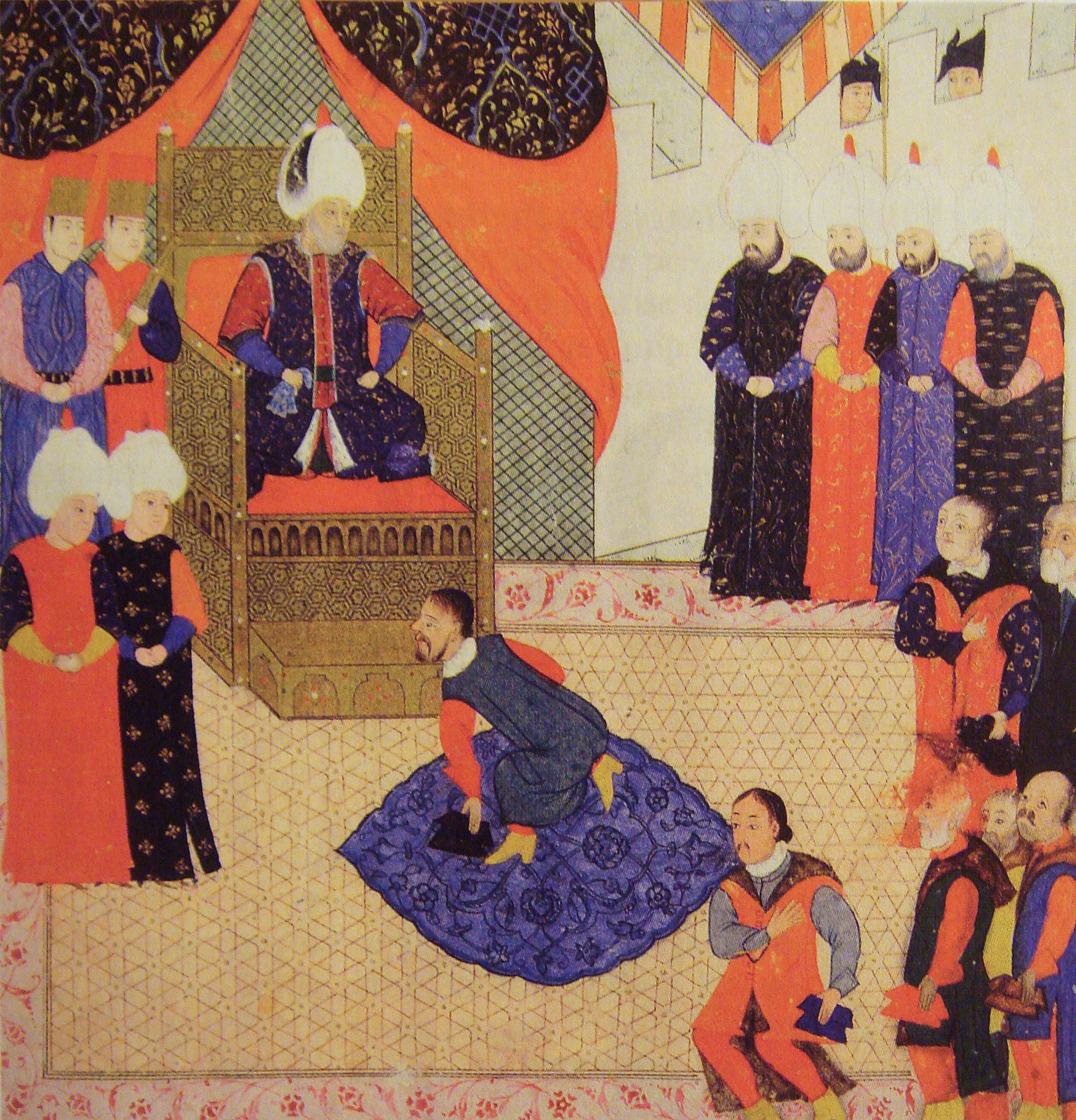
King John Sigismund of Hungary with Suleiman in 1556

By the 1540s, a renewal of the conflict in Hungary presented Suleiman with the opportunity to avenge the defeat suffered at Vienna. In 1541, the Habsburgs attempted to lay siege to Buda but were repulsed, and more Habsburg fortresses were captured by the Ottomans in two consecutive campaigns in 1541 and 1544 as a result. In 1542, after Ferdinand's repeated sieges of Buda and Pest, Suleiman went to Edirne on 17 November 1542 to prepare for a new campaign and stayed there for a while. On 23 April 1543, he set out on another campaign against Hungary. On 8 August, after a two-week siege, Esztergom was captured by the Ottoman Empire. Within a few weeks, the cities of Siklós, Székesfehérvár and Szeged were also taken. Ferdinand and Charles were forced to conclude a humiliating five-year treaty with Suleiman. Ferdinand renounced his claim to the Kingdom of Hungary and was forced to pay a fixed yearly sum to the Sultan for the Hungarian lands he continued to control. Of more symbolic importance, the treaty referred to Charles V not as "Emperor" but as the "King of Spain", leading Suleiman to identify as the true "Caesar". In 1552, Suleiman's forces laid siege to Eger, located in the northern part of the Kingdom of Hungary, but the defenders led by István Dobó repelled the attacks and defended the Eger Castle.

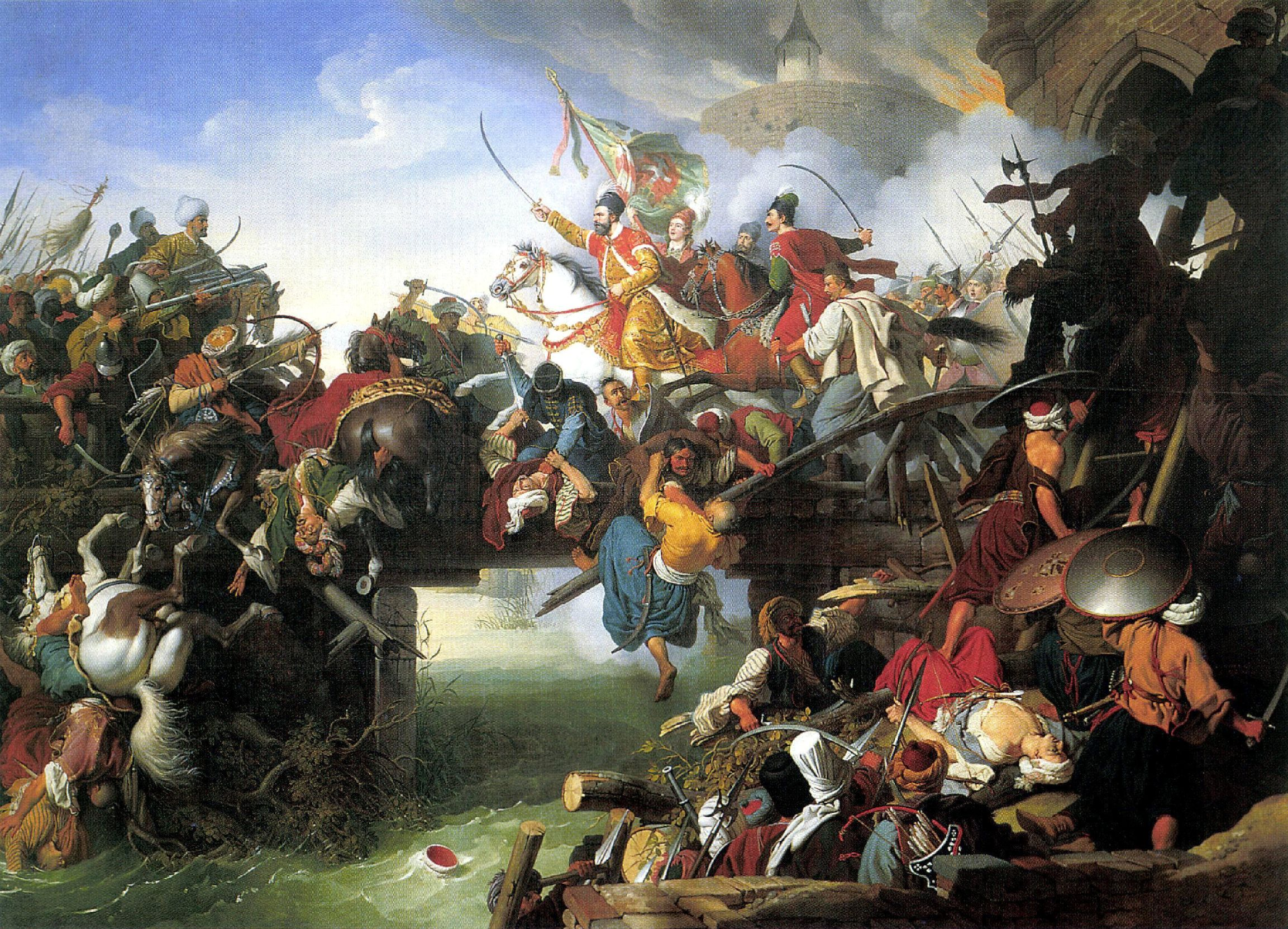
Siege of Szigetvár by Johann Peter Krafft, 1825

Suleiman, set out on his 13th expedition, Siege of Szigetvár on 1 May 1566, at the age of 72, after an absence of approximately 13 years. The Ottoman army, which arrived in Belgrade on 27 June and was joined by Sigismund Zapolya's forces, arrived in Szigetvár on 2 August. Suleiman arrived at the siege on 5 August and settled in his tent on a hill from which the siege could be seen. On 6 September, Suleiman died in his tent, one day before the fall of Szigetvár. His death was kept secret with great effort, with only the Sultan's innermost circle knowing of his demise. This was because the Ottomans feared that their soldiers would give up the battle if they knew that their leader had died, so his death was kept secret for 48 days. A courier was dispatched from the camp with a message for Suleiman's successor, Selim II.

=== Ottoman–Safavid War ===
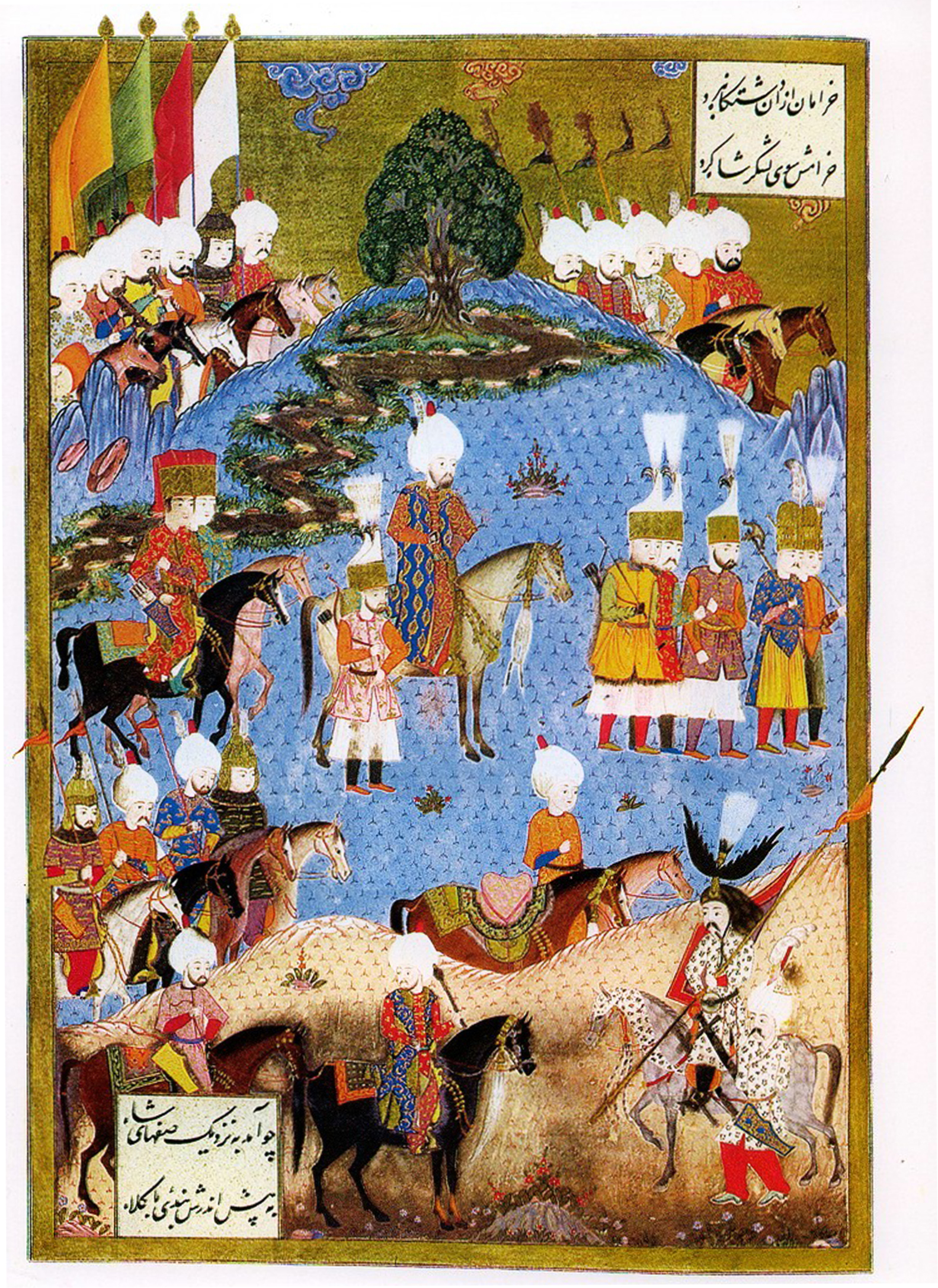
Miniature depicting Suleiman marching with an army in Nakhchivan, summer 1554

Suleiman's father had made war with Persia a high priority. At first, Suleiman shifted attention to Europe and was content to contain Persia, which was preoccupied by its own enemies to its east. After Suleiman stabilized his European frontiers, he now turned his attention to Persia, the base for the rival Shia Muslim faction. The Safavid dynasty became the main enemy after two episodes. First, Shah Tahmasp killed the Baghdad governor loyal to Suleiman, and installed his own man in his place. Second, the governor of Bitlis had defected and sworn allegiance to the Safavids. As a result, in 1533, Suleiman ordered Pargalı Ibrahim Pasha to lead an army into eastern Asia Minor where he retook Bitlis and occupied Tabriz without resistance. Suleiman joined Ibrahim in 1534. They made a push towards Persia, only to find the Shah sacrificing territory instead of facing a pitched battle, resorting to harassment of the Ottoman army as it proceeded along the harsh interior. In 1535 Suleiman made a grand entrance into Baghdad. He enhanced his local support by restoring the tomb of Abu Hanifa, the founder of the Hanafi school of Islamic law to which the Ottomans adhered.

Attempting to defeat the Shah once and for all, Suleiman embarked upon a second campaign in 1548–1549. As in the previous attempt, Tahmasp avoided confrontation with the Ottoman army and instead chose to retreat, using scorched earth tactics in the process and exposing the Ottoman army to the harsh winter of the Caucasus. Suleiman abandoned the campaign with temporary Ottoman gains in Tabriz and the Urmia region, a lasting presence in the province of Van, control of the western half of Azerbaijan and some forts in Georgia.

Territorial expansion of the Ottoman Empire under Suleiman, (in red and orange) including Ottoman vassals.

In 1553, Suleiman began his third and final campaign against the Shah. Having initially lost territories in Erzurum to the Shah's son, Suleiman retaliated by recapturing Erzurum, crossing the Upper Euphrates and laying waste to parts of Persia. The Shah's army continued its strategy of avoiding the Ottomans, leading to a stalemate from which neither army made any significant gain. In 1555, a settlement known as the Peace of Amasya was signed, which defined the borders of the two empires. By this treaty, Armenia and Georgia were divided equally between the two, with Western Armenia, western Kurdistan, and western Georgia (incl. western Samtskhe) falling in Ottoman hands while Eastern Armenia, eastern Kurdistan, and eastern Georgia (incl. eastern Samtskhe) stayed in Safavid hands. The Ottoman Empire obtained most of Iraq, including Baghdad, which gave them access to the Persian Gulf, while the Persians retained their former capital Tabriz and all their other northwestern territories in the Caucasus and as they were prior to the wars, such as Dagestan and all of what is now Azerbaijan.

=== Campaigns in the Indian Ocean ===
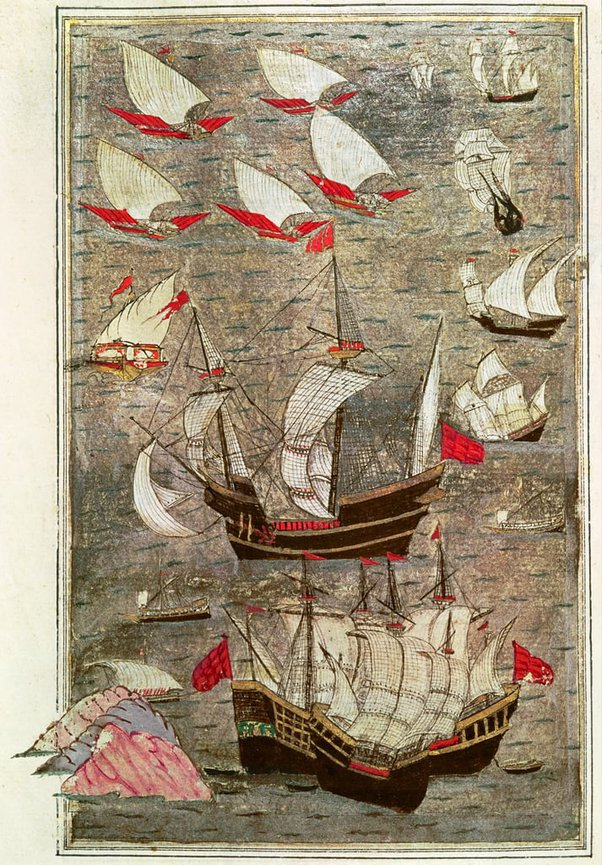
Ottoman fleet in the Indian Ocean in the 16th century

Ottoman ships had been sailing in the Indian Ocean since the year 1518. Ottoman admirals such as Hadim Suleiman Pasha, Seydi Ali Reis and Kurtoğlu Hızır Reis are known to have voyaged to the Mughal imperial ports of Thatta, Surat and Janjira. The Mughal Emperor Akbar the Great himself is known to have exchanged six documents with Suleiman the Magnificent.

Suleiman led several naval campaigns against the Portuguese in an attempt to remove them and reestablish trade with the Mughal Empire. Aden in Yemen was captured by the Ottomans in 1538, in order to provide an Ottoman base for raids against Portuguese possessions on the western coast of the Mughal Empire. Sailing on, the Ottomans failed against the Portuguese at the siege of Diu in September 1538, but then returned to Aden, where they fortified the city with 100 pieces of artillery. From this base, Suleiman Pasha managed to take control of the whole country of Yemen, also taking Sanaa.

With its strong control of the Red Sea, Suleiman successfully managed to dispute control of the trade routes to the Portuguese and maintained a significant level of trade with the Mughal Empire throughout the 16th century.

From 1526 until 1543, Suleiman stationed over 900 Turkish soldiers to fight alongside the Somali Adal Sultanate led by Ahmad ibn Ibrahim al-Ghazi during the Conquest of Abyssinia. After the first Ajuran-Portuguese war, the Ottoman Empire would in 1559 absorb the weakened Adal Sultanate into its domain. This expansion furthered Ottoman rule in Somalia and the Horn of Africa. This also increased its influence in the Indian Ocean to compete with the Portuguese Empire with its close ally, the Ajuran Empire.

In 1564, Suleiman received an embassy from Aceh (a sultanate on Sumatra, in modern Indonesia), requesting Ottoman support against the Portuguese. As a result, an Ottoman expedition to Aceh was launched, which was able to provide extensive military support to the Acehnese.

The discovery of new maritime trade routes by Western European states allowed them to avoid the Ottoman trade monopoly. The Portuguese discovery of the Cape of Good Hope in 1488 initiated a series of Ottoman-Portuguese naval wars in the Ocean throughout the 16th century. The Ajuran Sultanate allied with the Ottomans defied the Portuguese economic monopoly in the Indian Ocean by employing a new coinage which followed the Ottoman pattern, thus proclaiming an attitude of economic independence in regard to the Portuguese.

=== Mediterranean and North Africa ===
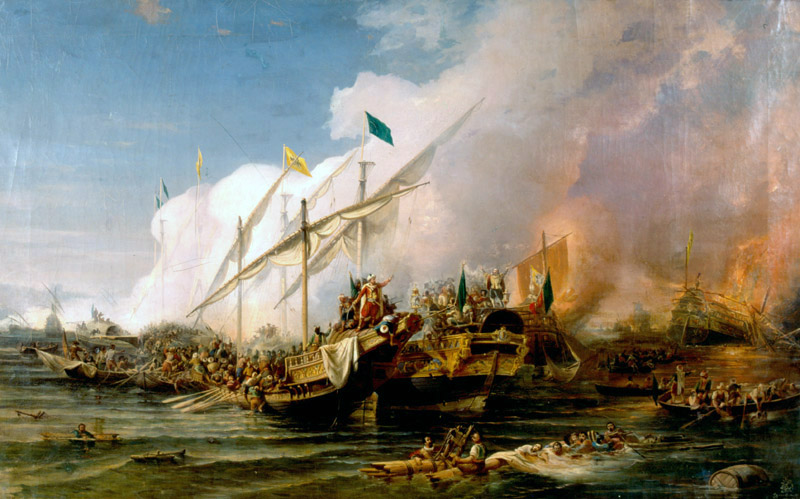
Barbarossa Hayreddin Pasha defeats the Holy League under the command of Andrea Doria at the Battle of Preveza in 1538

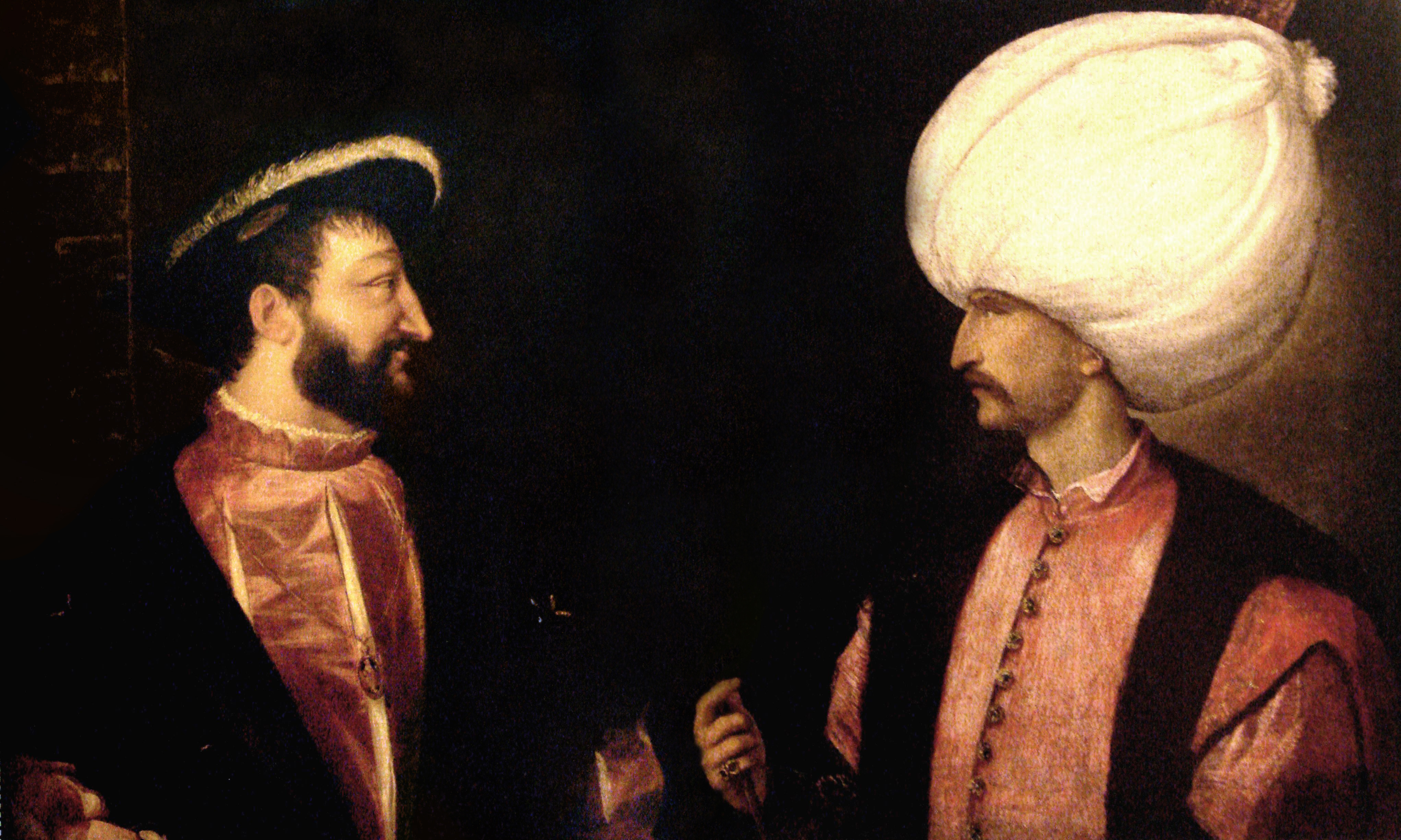
France's King Francis I never met Suleiman, but they created a Franco-Ottoman alliance from the 1530s.

Having consolidated his conquests on land, Suleiman was greeted with the news that the fortress of Koroni in Morea (the modern Peloponnese, peninsular Greece) had been lost to Charles V's admiral, Andrea Doria. The presence of the Spanish in the Eastern Mediterranean concerned Suleiman, who saw it as an early indication of Charles V's intention to rival Ottoman dominance in the region. Recognizing the need to reassert naval preeminence in the Mediterranean, Suleiman appointed an exceptional naval commander in the form of Khair ad Din, known to Europeans as Barbarossa. Once appointed admiral-in-chief, Barbarossa was charged with rebuilding the Ottoman fleet.

In 1535, Charles V led a Holy League of 26,700 soldiers (10,000 Spaniards, 8,000 Italians, 8,000 Germans, and 700 Knights of St. John) to victory against the Ottomans at Tunis, which together with the war against Venice the following year, led Suleiman to accept proposals from Francis I of France to form an alliance against Charles. Huge Muslim territories in North Africa were annexed. The piracy carried on thereafter by the Barbary pirates of North Africa can be seen in the context of the wars against Spain.

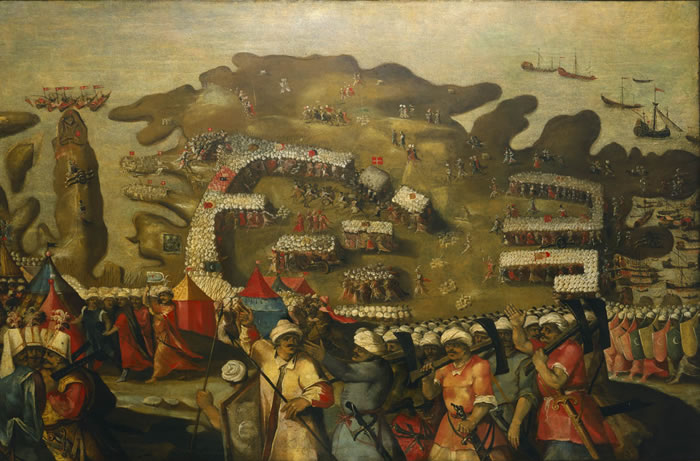
The siege of Malta in 1565: arrival of the Turkish fleet, by Matteo Perez d'Aleccio

In 1541, the Spaniards led an unsuccessful expedition to Algiers. In 1542, facing a common Habsburg enemy during the Italian Wars, Francis I sought to renew the Franco-Ottoman alliance. In early 1542, Polin successfully negotiated the details of the alliance, with the Ottoman Empire promising to send 60,000 troops against the territories of the German king Ferdinand, as well as 150 galleys against Charles, while France promised to attack Flanders, harass the coasts of Spain with a naval force, and send 40 galleys to assist the Turks for operations in the Levant.

In August 1551, Ottoman naval commander Turgut Reis attacked and captured Tripoli, which had been a possession of the Knights of Malta since 1530. In 1553, Turgut Reis was nominated commander of Tripoli by Suleiman, making the city an important center for piratical raids in the Mediterranean and the capital of the Ottoman province of Tripolitania. In 1560, a powerful naval force was sent to recapture Tripoli, but that force was defeated in the Battle of Djerba.

Elsewhere in the Mediterranean, when the Knights Hospitallers were re-established as the Knights of Malta in 1530, their actions against Muslim navies quickly drew the ire of the Ottomans, who assembled another massive army in order to dislodge the Knights from Malta. The Ottomans invaded Malta in 1565, undertaking the Great Siege of Malta, which began on 18 May and lasted until 8 September, and is portrayed vividly in the frescoes of Matteo Perez d'Aleccio in the Hall of St. Michael and St. George. At first, it seemed that this would be a repeat of the battle on Rhodes, with most of Malta's cities destroyed and half the Knights killed in battle; but a relief force from Spain entered the battle, resulting in the loss of 10,000 Ottoman troops and the victory of the local Maltese citizenry.

== Legal and political reforms ==
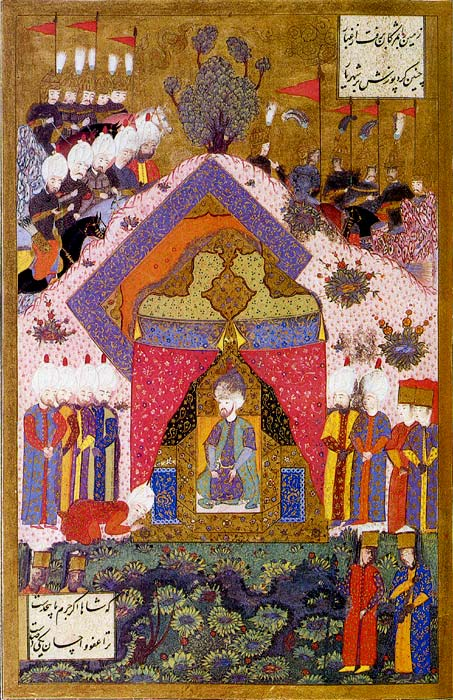
Suleiman the Magnificent receives an ambassador (painting by Matrakçı Nasuh)

While Sultan Suleiman was known as "the Magnificent" in the West, he was always Kanuni Suleiman or "The Lawgiver" (قانونی) to his Ottoman subjects. The overriding law of the empire was the Shari'ah, or Sacred Law, which as the divine law of Islam was outside of the Sultan's powers to change. Yet an area of distinct law known as the Kanuns (قانون, canonical legislation) was dependent on Suleiman's will alone, covering areas such as criminal law, land tenure and taxation. He collected all the judgments that had been issued by the nine Ottoman Sultans who preceded him. After eliminating duplications and choosing between contradictory statements, he issued a single legal code, all the while being careful not to violate the basic laws of Islam.

It was within this framework that Suleiman, supported by his Grand Mufti Ebussuud, sought to reform the legislation to adapt to a rapidly changing empire. When the Kanun laws attained their final form, the code of laws became known as the kanun‐i Osmani (قانون عثمانی), or the "Ottoman laws". Suleiman's legal code was to last more than three hundred years.

The Sultan also played a role in protecting the Jewish subjects of his empire for centuries to come. In late 1553 or 1554, on the suggestion of his favorite doctor and dentist, the Spanish Jew Moses Hamon, the Sultan issued a firman (فرمان) formally denouncing blood libels against the Jews. Furthermore, Suleiman enacted new criminal and police legislation, prescribing a set of fines for specific offenses, as well as reducing the instances requiring death or mutilation. In the area of taxation, taxes were levied on various goods and produce, including animals, mines, profits of trade, and import-export duties.

Higher medreses provided education of university status, whose graduates became imams (امام) or teachers. Educational centers were often one of many buildings surrounding the courtyards of mosques. Other medreses also included libraries, baths, soup kitchens, residences and hospitals for the benefit of the public.

== The arts under Suleiman ==
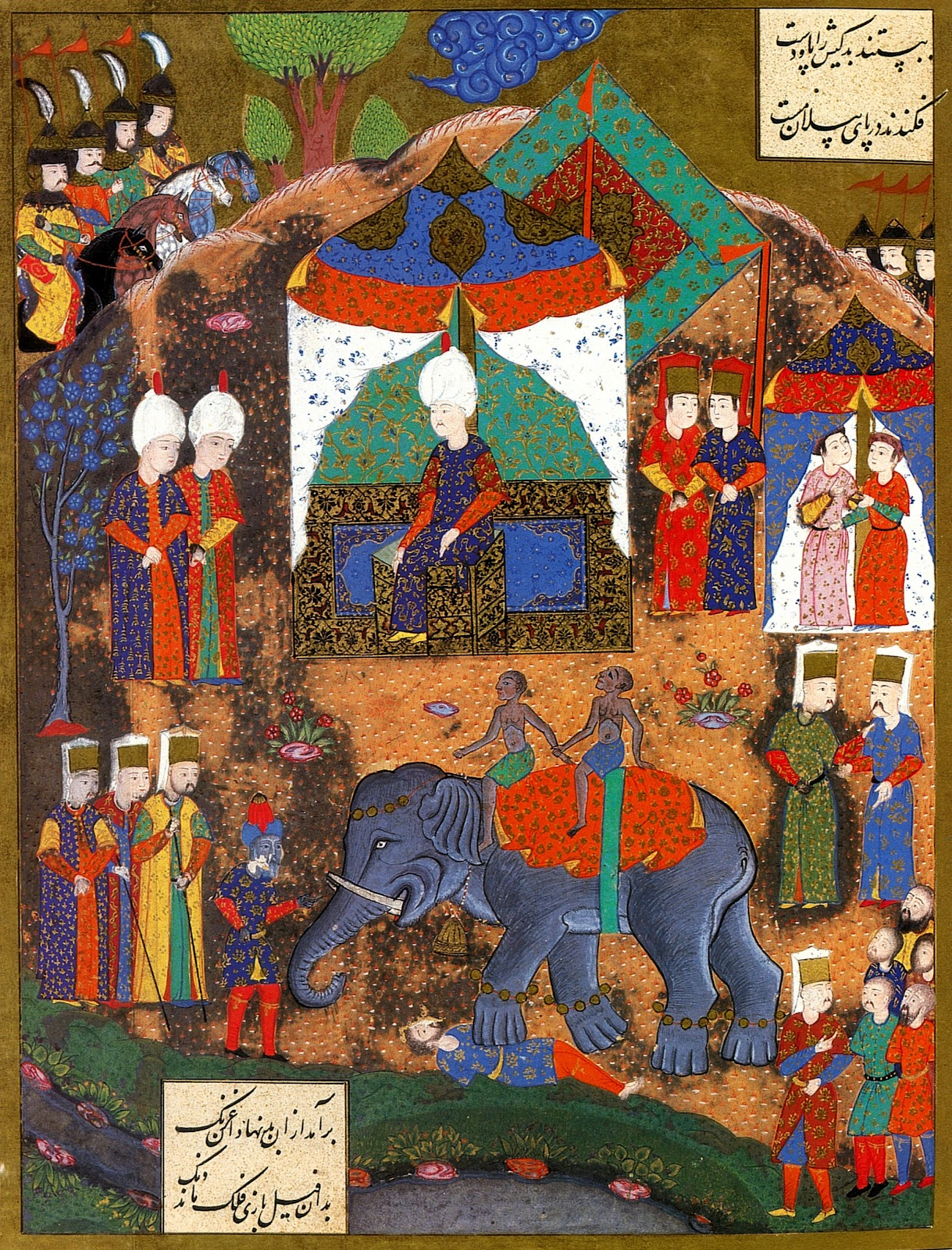
Ottoman miniature from the Süleymanname depicting the execution by elephant of defeated enemy in Belgrade

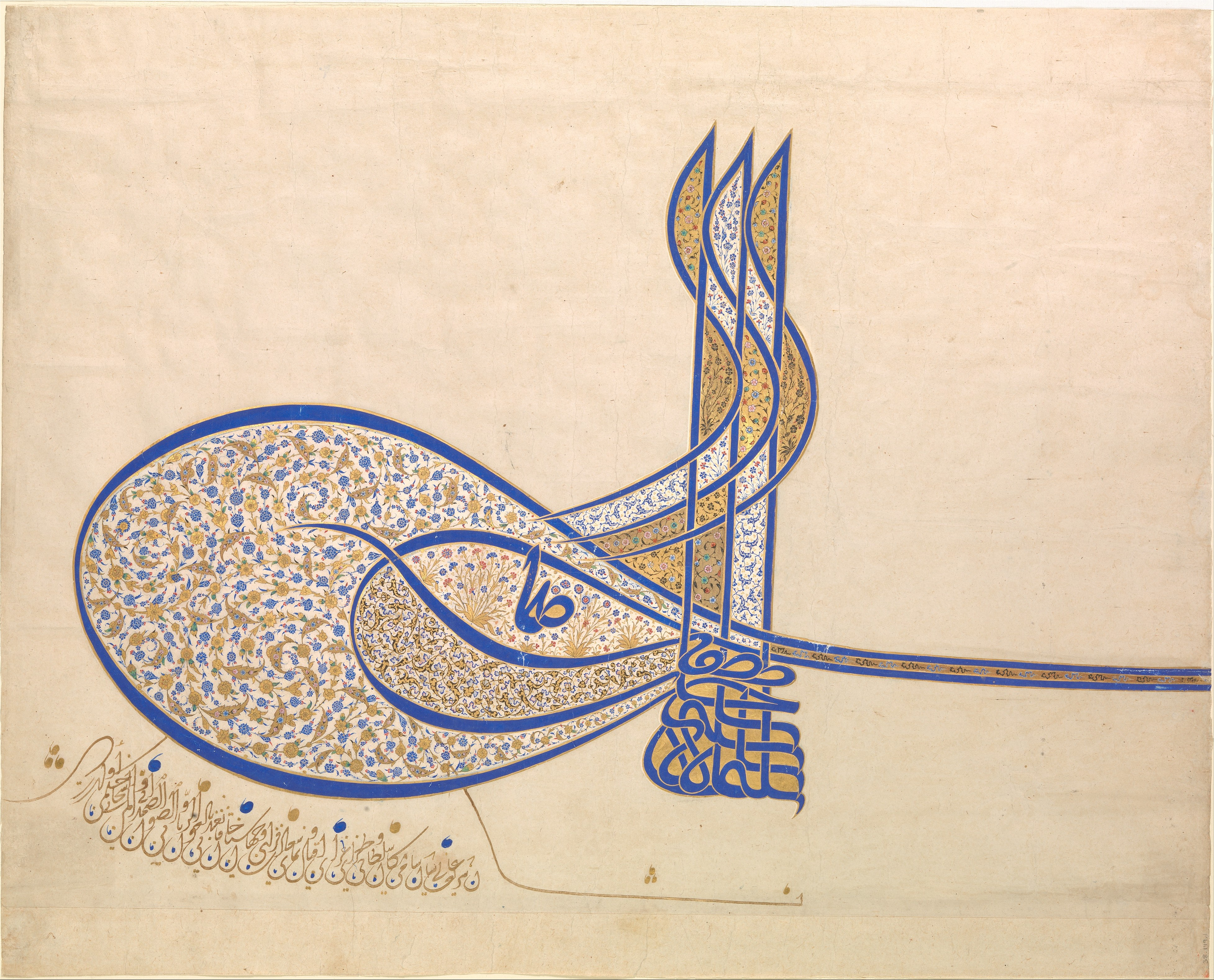
Tughra of Suleiman the Magnificent

Under Suleiman's patronage, the Ottoman Empire entered the golden age of its cultural development. Hundreds of imperial artistic societies (called the اهل حرف Ehl-i Hiref, "Community of the Craftsmen") were administered at the Imperial seat, the Topkapı Palace. After an apprenticeship, artists and craftsmen could advance in rank within their field and were paid commensurate wages in quarterannual installments. Payroll registers that survive testify to the breadth of Suleiman's patronage of the arts, the earliest of the documents dating from 1526 list 40 societies with over 600 members. The Ehl-i Hiref attracted the empire's most talented artisans to the Sultan's court, both from the Islamic world and from the recently conquered territories in Europe, resulting in a blend of Arabic, Turkish and European cultures. Artisans in service of the court included painters, book binders, furriers, jewellers and goldsmiths. Whereas previous rulers had been influenced by Persian culture (Suleiman's father, Selim I, wrote poetry in Persian), Suleiman's patronage of the arts saw the Ottoman Empire assert its own artistic legacy.

The long reign of Suleiman the Magnificent is also recognized as the apogee of Ottoman political and cultural development, with extensive patronage in art and architecture by the sultan, his family, and his high-ranking officials. The master architect of the classical period, Mimar Sinan, served as the chief court architect (mimarbaşi) from 1538 until his death in 1588. Sinan credited himself with the design of over 300 buildings, though another estimate of his works puts it at nearly 500. He is credited with designing buildings as far as Buda (present-day Budapest) and Mecca. Sinan was probably not present to directly supervise projects far from the capital, so in these cases his designs were most likely executed by his assistants or by local architects. This also demonstrates the ability of the central Ottoman state to commission and plan building projects across its vast territory at the time, a practice that also helped to establish Ottoman sovereignty in these provinces through the construction of monuments in a visibly Ottoman style. Architects in the capital were able to draw plans and delegate them to other architects who carried them out locally, while the imperial administration developed a set of standards for planning and construction and was able to coordinate the procurement and transportation of the necessary materials.

Suleiman himself was an accomplished poet, writing in Persian and Turkish under the takhallus (nom de plume) Muhibbi (محبی, "Lover"). Some of Suleiman's verses have become Turkish proverbs, such as the well-known Everyone aims at the same meaning, but many are the versions of the story. When his young son Mehmed died in 1543, he composed a moving chronogram to commemorate the year: Peerless among princes, my Sultan Mehmed. In Turkish the chronogram reads شهزاده‌لر گزیده‌سی سلطان محمدم (Şehzadeler güzidesi Sultan Muhammed'üm), in which the Arabic Abjad numerals total 955, the equivalent in the Islamic calendar of 1543 AD. In addition to Suleiman's own work, many great talents enlivened the literary world during Suleiman's rule, including Fuzûlî and Bâkî. The literary historian Elias John Wilkinson Gibb observed that "at no time, even in Turkey, was greater encouragement given to poetry than during the reign of this Sultan". Suleiman's most famous verse is:

The people think of wealth and power as the greatest fate,
But in this world a spell of health is the best state.
What men call sovereignty is a worldly strife and constant war;
Worship of God is the highest throne, the happiest of all estates.

Suleiman is credited with large-scale cultivation of the tulip and it is thought that the tulips spread throughout Europe because of Suleiman. It is thought that diplomats who visited him were gifted the flowers while visiting his court. Some of the nobles in the court had seen the tulip and they also began growing their own. Soon images of the tulip were woven into rugs and fired into ceramics.

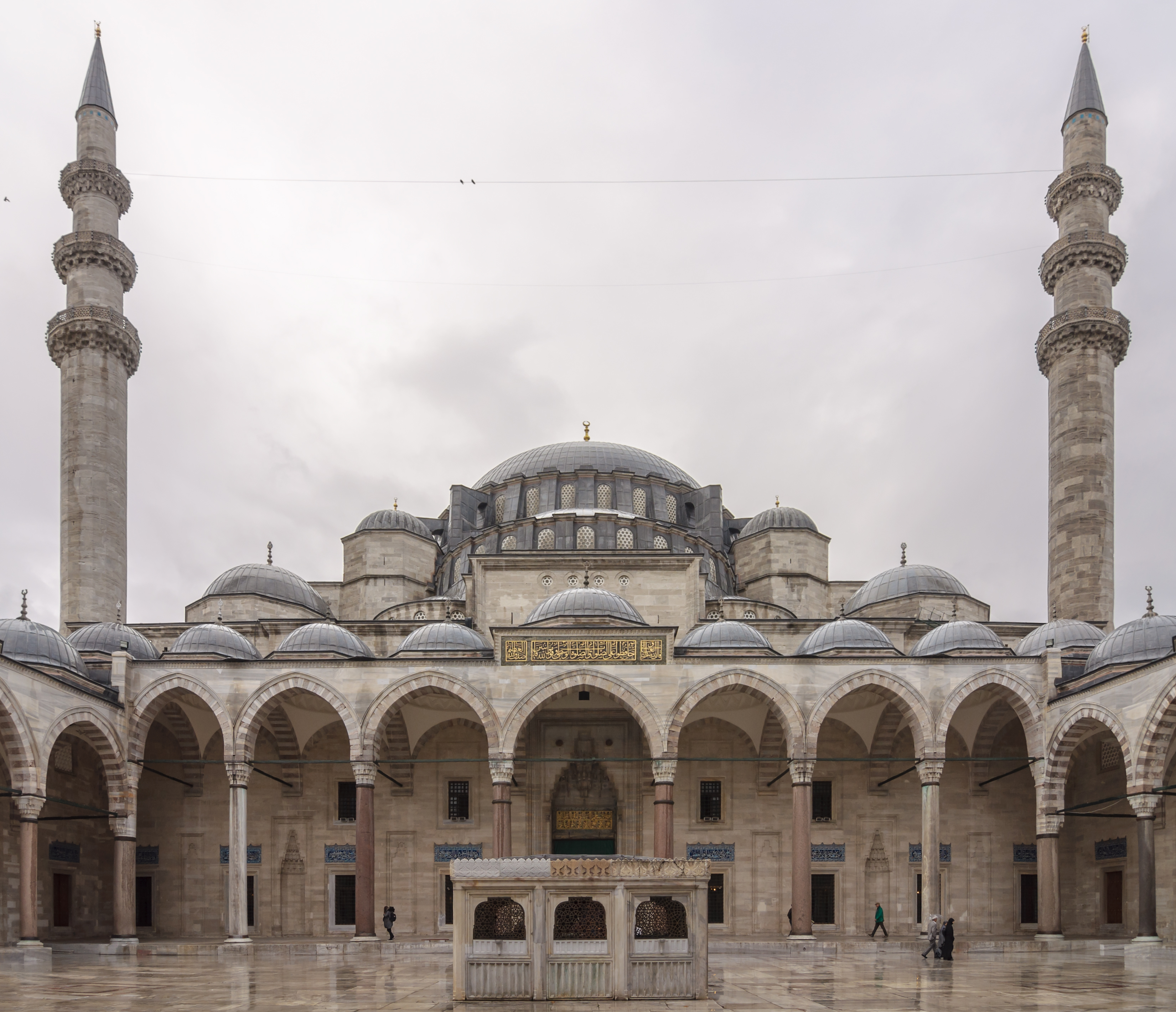
Süleymaniye Mosque in Istanbul, built by Mimar Sinan, Suleiman's chief architect.

=== Artistic developments ===
Among the leading poets who emerged during the reign of Suleiman I are Fuzûlî, Bâki, Pir Sultan Abdal and Bağdatlı Ruhi . Matrakçı Nasuh was one of the important painters, historians and miniature artists of the period. Also living in this period and writing the Suleimanname, Shahnameh Arifî, Nakkaş Nigarî and calligrapher Ahmed Karahisari are among the leading artists of the period.

During the reign of Sultan Suleiman, the Grand Vizier Pargalı Ibrahim Pasha also brought mythological statues known as the Three Beauties from Buda to Istanbul after the Battle of Mohács and erected them in his palace in the At Meydanı. Although these statues attracted attention, they were not permanent because they were seen as idols by some circles and were not welcomed. In addition to these statues, works by some Eastern and Western thinkers were brought from Buda to Istanbul and a library was established. These works were obtained as war booty from the large library established by the Hungarian king Matthias Corvinus. In this respect, Suleiman takes his place as an influential and important sultan in the Ottoman library culture. At the same time, in 1532, during the Ottoman-Habsburg rivalry, Suleiman the Magnificent wanted to show his superiority in every field, so he had a four-tiered crown made by Venetian merchants for 115,000 ducats through the Italian chief treasurer Alvise Gritti and with the encouragement of Makbul İbrahim Pasha . The four layers of the crown represent the four continents known at the time, and it is also known that it was made as a reference to the famous three-tiered crown of the Pope. Although it is thought that the crown was melted down after Süleyman, its legend in Europe did not end, and it was frequently depicted by European painters on the heads of Ottoman Sultans such as Mehmed IV and Ahmed I.

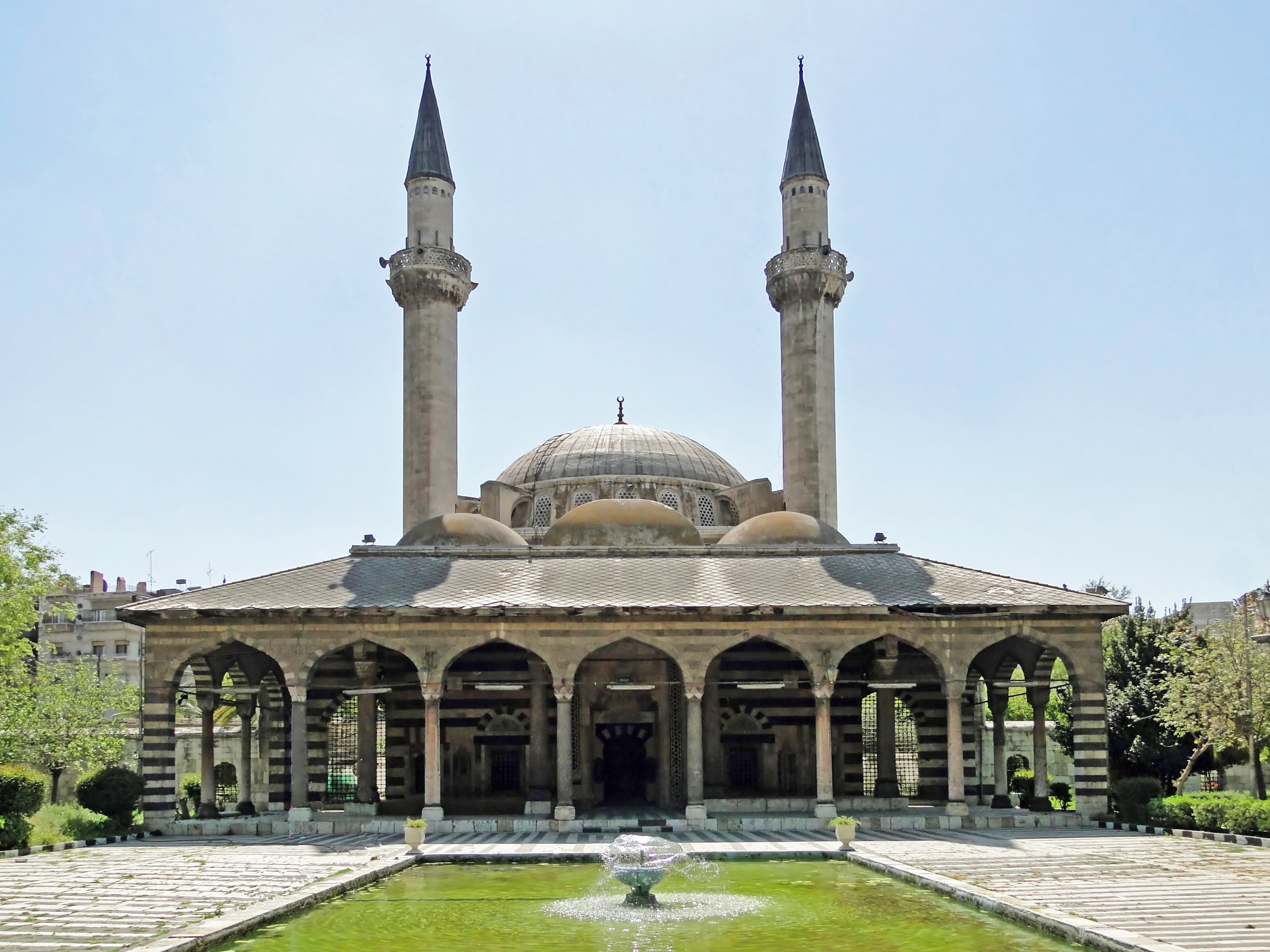
Sulaymaniyya Takiyya in Damascus

Suleiman also became renowned for sponsoring a series of monumental architectural developments within his empire. The Sultan sought to turn Constantinople into the center of Islamic civilization by a series of projects, including bridges, mosques, palaces and various charitable and social establishments. The greatest of these were built by the Sultan's chief architect, Mimar Sinan, under whom Ottoman architecture reached its zenith. Sinan became responsible for over three hundred monuments throughout the empire, including his two masterpieces, the Süleymaniye and Selimiye mosques—the latter built in Adrianople (now Edirne) in the reign of Suleiman's son Selim II. Suleiman also restored the Dome of the Rock in Jerusalem and the Walls of Jerusalem (which are the current walls of the Old City of Jerusalem), renovated the Kaaba in Mecca, and constructed a complex in Damascus.

Şehzade Mosque complex, commissioned by Suleiman was dedicated to Şehzade Mehmed, his son who died in 1543. The mosque complex was built between 1545 and 1548. Like all imperial külliyes, it included multiple buildings, of which the mosque was the most prominent element. The mosque has a rectangular floor plan divided into two equal squares, with one square occupied by the courtyard and the other occupied by the prayer hall. Two minarets stand on either side at the junction of these two squares.

In 1550, through Mimar Sinan, Suleiman began construction for the Süleymaniye complex, a monumental religious and charitable complex dedicated to him. Construction finished in 1557. Following the example of the earlier Fatih complex, it consists of many buildings arranged around the main mosque in the center, on a planned site occupying the summit of a hill in Istanbul. The buildings included the mosque itself, four general madrasas, a madrasa specialized for medicine, a madrasa specialized for hadiths (darülhadis), a mektep, a darüşşifa, a caravanserai, a tabhane, an imaret, a hammam, rows of shops, and a cemetery with two mausoleums. The site was formerly occupied by the grounds of the Old Palace (Eski Saray) built by Mehmet II, which had been damaged by fire. By this point, Suleiman had also moved his own residence and the royal family to Topkapı Palace. In order to adapt the hilltop site, Sinan had to begin by laying solid foundations and retaining walls to form a wide terrace. The overall layout of buildings is less rigidly symmetrical than the Fatih complex, as Sinan opted to integrate it more flexibly into the existing urban fabric. Thanks to its refined architecture, its scale, its dominant position on the city skyline, and its role as a symbol of Suleiman's powerful reign, the Süleymaniye Mosque complex is one of the most important symbols of Ottoman architecture and is often considered by scholars to be the most magnificent mosque in Istanbul.

The prayer hall consists of a central dome surrounded by semi-domes on four sides, with smaller domes occupying the corners. Smaller semi-domes also fill the space between the corner domes and the main semi-domes. This design represents the culmination of the previous domed and semi-domed buildings in Ottoman architecture, bringing complete symmetry to the dome layout. An early version of this design, on a smaller scale, had been used before Sinan as early as 1520 or 1523 in the Fatih Pasha Mosque in Diyarbakir. While a cross-like layout had symbolic meaning in Christian architecture, in Ottoman architecture this was purely focused on heightening and emphasizing the central dome.

Under his reign, The Topkapı Palace was greatly expanded with the permanent addition of the Imperial Harem to the Palace. From the reign of Suleiman, Topkapi not only served as the administrative center of the Empire, but also as the Imperial Residence of all succeeding Ottoman Sultans and the entire Ottoman Royal family until the 19th century.

== Personal life ==
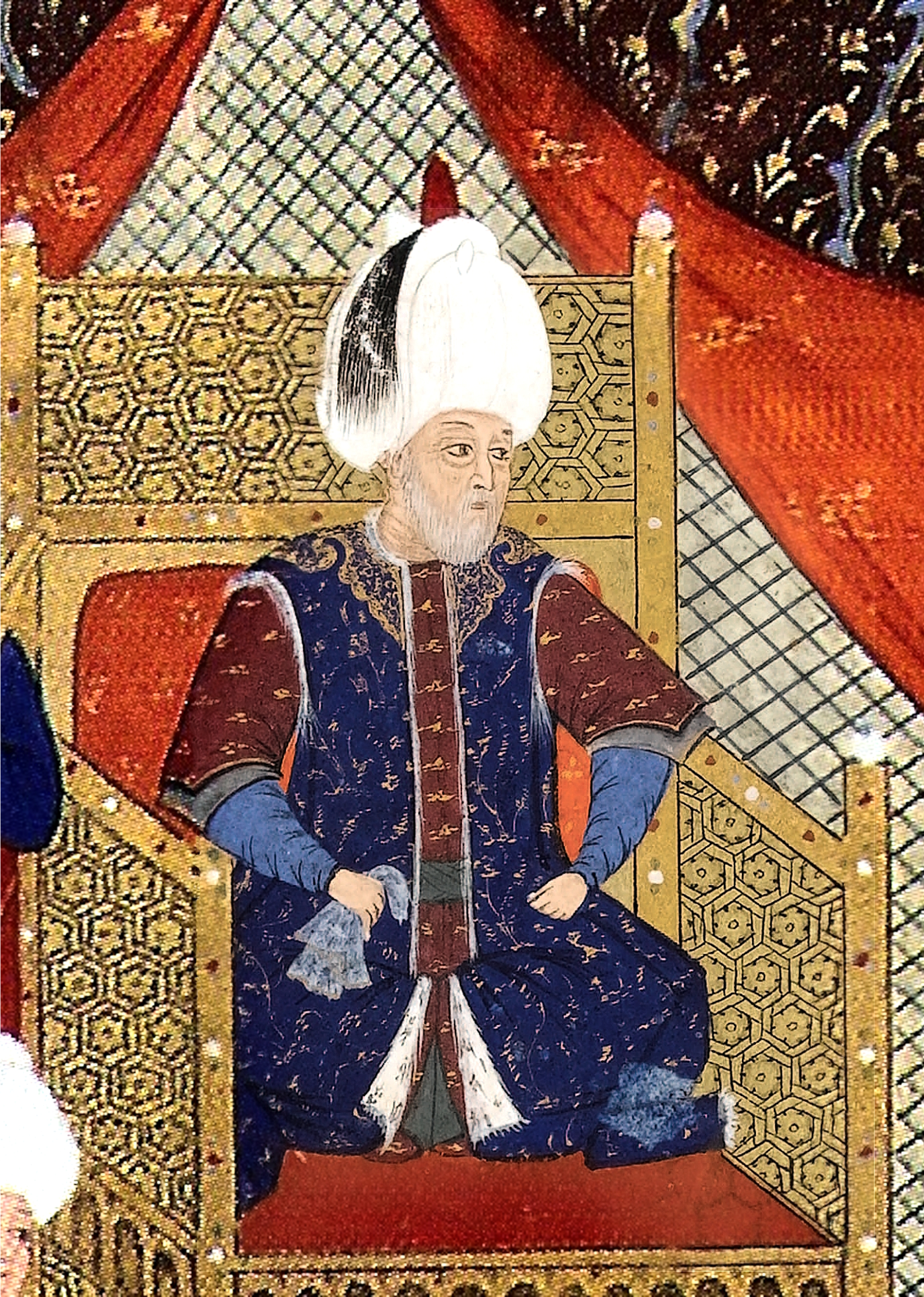
Real-life portrait of Suleiman I by Nakkaş Osman. This is considered as one of his most realistic portraits, here the year of his death in 1566. History of the Szigetvár Campaign, 1568-69 (TSMK H.1339).

=== Consorts ===
Suleiman had three known consorts:

- Mükerrem Hatun (c. 1496 – c. 1550, Old Palace, Constantinople)
- Mahidevran Hatun (c.1499 – 3 February 1581) a Circassian, Albanian, Montenegrin, or Crimean concubine, mother of his eldest surviving son Şehzade Mustafa, who was executed in 1553. She entered into Süleyman's harem when he was prince in Manisa.
- Hürrem Sultan (c. 1505/1507 – 15 April 1558), known in West as Roxelana (m. 1534), Suleiman's favorite concubine during his reign, and later his legal wife and first Haseki sultan of the Ottoman Empire, influencing state affairs and the administration of the empire, mother of most of his children, including his successor Selim II, and the only woman with whom he had monogamous relationship during his entire reign. Her influence over the Ottoman empire started an era known as Sultanate of Women, where several individual mothers of Sultans could exercise considerable levels of influence throughout the empire. She was possibly a daughter of a Ruthenian Orthodox priest.

=== Sons ===
Suleiman I had at least eight sons:

- Şehzade Mahmud (c. 1513, Manisa Palace, Manisa – 29 October 1520, Old Palace, Istanbul, and buried in Yavuz Selim Mosque);
- Şehzade Murad (c. 1515, Manisa Palace, Manisa – 19 October 1520, Old Palace, and Istanbul, buried in Yavuz Selim Mosque);
- Şehzade Mustafa (c. 1516/1517, Manisa Palace, Manisa – executed, by the order of his father, 6 October 1553, Konya, buried in Muradiye Complex, Bursa), with Mahidevran;
- Şehzade Mehmed (1521, Old Palace, Istanbul – 6 November 1543, Manisa Palace, Manisa, buried in Şehzade Mosque, Istanbul), with Hürrem;
- Sultan Selim II (30 May 1524, Old Palace, Istanbul – 15 December 1574, Topkapı Palace, Istanbul, buried in Selim II Mausoleum, Hagia Sophia Mosque), with Hürrem;
- Şehzade Abdullah (c. 1525, Old Palace, Istanbul – c. 1528, Old Palace, Istanbul, and buried in Yavuz Selim Mosque), with Hürrem;
- Şehzade Bayezid (1527, Old Palace, Istanbul – executed by agents of his father on 25 September 1561, Qazvin, Safavid Empire, buried in Melik-i Acem Türbe, Sivas), with Hürrem;
- Şehzade Cihangir (1531, Old Palace, Istanbul – 27 November 1553, Konya, buried in Şehzade Mosque, Istanbul), with Hürrem;

=== Daughters ===
Suleiman had two daughters:

- Raziye Sultan (died c. 1521, and buried in Yahya Efendi mausoleum);
- Mihrimah Sultan (September/November 1522, Old Palace, Istanbul – 25 January 1578, Old Palace, Istanbul, buried in Suleiman I Mausoleum, Süleymaniye Mosque), with Hürrem, married Rüstem Pasha in 1539;

=== Relationship with Hürrem Sultan ===
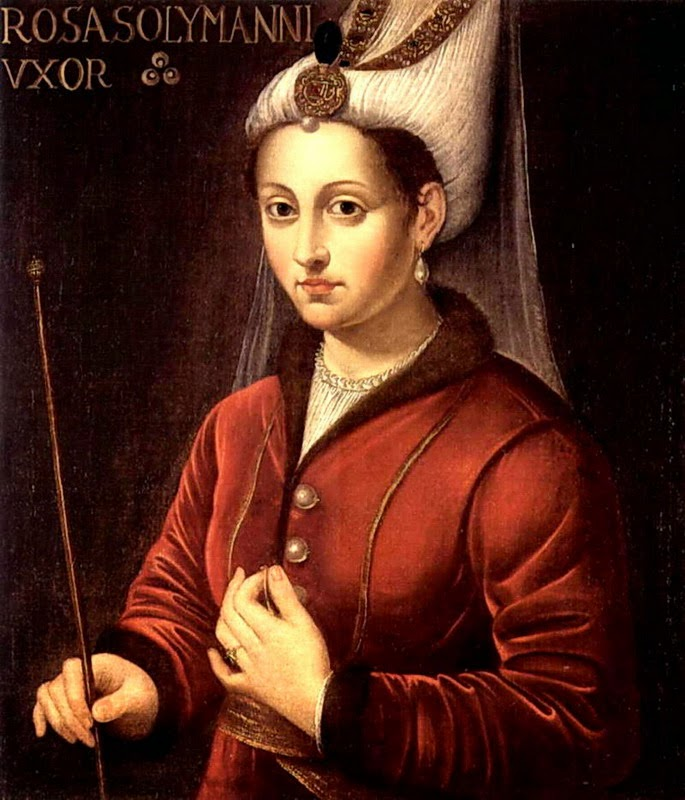
16th-century oil painting of Hürrem Sultan

Suleiman fell in love with Hürrem Sultan, a harem girl from Ruthenia, then part of Poland. Western diplomats, taking notice of the palace gossip about her, called her "Russelazie" or "Roxelana", referring to her Ruthenian origins. The daughter of an Orthodox priest, she was captured by Tatars from Crimea, sold as a slave in Constantinople, and eventually rose through the ranks of the Harem to become Suleiman's favorite. Hürrem, a former concubine, became the legal wife of the Sultan, much to the astonishment of the observers in the palace and the city. He also allowed Hürrem Sultan to remain with him at court for the rest of her life, breaking another tradition—that when imperial heirs came of age, they would be sent along with the imperial concubine who bore them to govern remote provinces of the Empire, never to return unless their progeny succeeded to the throne.

Hürrem was the first Ottoman woman to directly take part in state affairs of the Ottoman Empire and she acted as an advisor to Suleiman in taking decisions. She used to sign documents in his absence, attended Imperial council meetings, held meetings with Grand Viziers and ministers to discuss regarding state affairs, controlled the appointments and even removal of ministers, grand vizier and even the Sheikh-ul-Islam from office and corresponded with ambassadors and Foreign rulers, particularly with Sigismund II Augustus. She played a major role in the creation of the Polish-Ottoman alliance. Suleiman not only declared her as his legal wife, but also created an Institutionalized title and position for her as the Haseki sultan of the Ottoman Empire, making her the second most powerful person in the empire after Suleiman. Suleiman was completely loyal towards her for rest of his life, and his decisions to grant her more powers made rumors throughout the Ottoman court that the sultan had been bewitched.

Under his pen name, Muhibbi, Sultan Suleiman composed this poem for Hürrem Sultan:

Throne of my lonely niche, my wealth, my love, my moonlight.
My most sincere friend, my confidant, my very existence, my Sultan, my one and only love.
The most beautiful among the beautiful ...
My springtime, my merry faced love, my daytime, my sweetheart, laughing leaf ...
My plants, my sweet, my rose, the one only who does not distress me in this room ...
My Istanbul, my Karaman, the earth of my Anatolia
My Badakhshan, my Baghdad and Khorasan
My woman of the beautiful hair, my love of the slanted brow, my love of eyes full of misery ...
I'll sing your praises always
I, lover of the tormented heart, Muhibbi of the eyes full of tears, I am happy.

=== Grand Vizier Pargalı Ibrahim Pasha ===
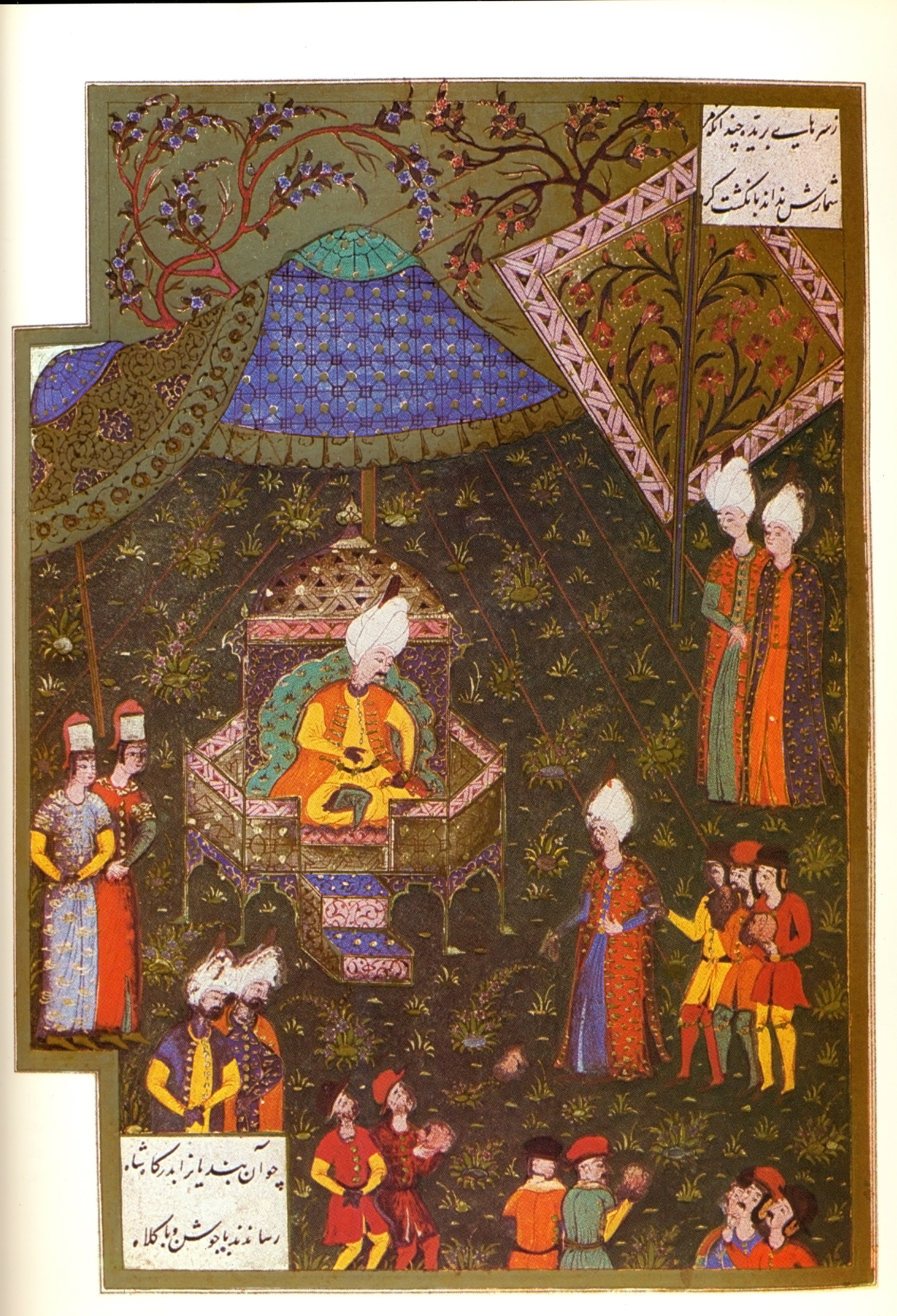
Suleiman awaits the arrival of his Grand Vizier Pargalı Ibrahim Pasha at Buda, 1529.

Before his downfall, Pargalı Ibrahim Pasha was an inseparable friend and possible lover of Suleiman. In fact, he is referred to by his chroniclers as "the favourite" (Maḳbūl) along with "the executed" (Maḳtūl). Historians state that Suleiman I is remembered for "his passion for two of his slaves: for his beloved Ibrahim when the sultan was a hot-blooded youth, and for his beloved Hurrem when he was mature."

Ibrahim was originally a Christian from Parga (in Epirus), who was captured in a raid during the 1499–1503 Ottoman–Venetian War, and was given as a slave to Suleiman most likely in 1514. Ibrahim converted to Islam and Suleiman made him the royal falconer, then promoted him to first officer of the Royal Bedchamber. It was reported that they slept together in the same bed. The sultan also built Ibrahim a lavish palace on the ancient Hippodrome, Istanbul's main forum outside the Hagia Sophia and Topkapı Palace. Despite his following marriage and his new sumptuous residence, Ibrahim sometimes spent the night with Suleiman I at Topkapı Palace. In turn, the sultan occasionally slept at Ibrahim's lodgings. Ibrahim Pasha rose to Grand Vizier in 1523 and commander-in-chief of all the armies. Suleiman also conferred upon Ibrahim Pasha the honor of beylerbey of Rumelia (first-ranking military governor-general), granting Ibrahim authority over all Ottoman territories in Europe, as well as command of troops residing within them in times of war. At the time, Ibrahim was only about thirty years old and lacked any actual military expertise; it is said that 'tongues wagged' at this unprecedented promotion straight from palace service to the two highest offices of the empire.

During his thirteen years as Grand Vizier, his rapid rise to power and vast accumulation of wealth had made Ibrahim many enemies at the Sultan's court. Suleiman's suspicion of Ibrahim was worsened by a quarrel between the latter and the finance secretary (defterdar) İskender Çelebi. The dispute ended in the disgrace of Çelebi on charges of intrigue, with Ibrahim convincing Suleiman to sentence the defterdar to death. Ibrahim also supported Şehzade Mustafa as the successor of Suleiman. This caused disputes between him and Hürrem Sultan, who wanted her sons to succeed to the throne. Ibrahim eventually fell from grace with the Sultan and his wife. Suleiman consulted his Qadi, who suggested that Ibrahim be put to death. The Sultan recruited assassins and ordered them to strangle Ibrahim in his sleep.

== Succession ==
Sultan Suleiman's two known consorts (Hurrem and Mahidevran) had borne him six sons, four of whom survived past the 1550s. They were Mustafa, Selim, Bayezid, and Cihangir. The eldest was Mahidevran's son, while Selim, Bayezid, and Cihangir were born to Hurrem. Hurrem is usually held at least partly responsible for the intrigues in nominating a successor, though there is no evidence to support this. Although she was Suleiman's wife, she exercised no official public role. This did not, however, prevent Hurrem from wielding powerful political influence. Until the reign of Ahmed I (1603–1617), the Empire had no formal means of nominating a successor, so successions usually involved the death of competing princes in order to avert civil unrest and rebellions.

By 1552, when the campaign against Persia had begun with Rüstem appointed commander-in-chief of the expedition, intrigues against Mustafa began. Rüstem sent one of Suleiman's most trusted men to report that since Suleiman was not at the head of the army, the soldiers thought the time had come to put a younger prince on the throne; at the same time, he spread rumours that Mustafa had proved receptive to the idea. Angered by what he came to believe were Mustafa's plans to claim the throne, the following summer upon return from his campaign in Persia, Suleiman summoned him to his tent in the Ereğli valley. When Mustafa entered his father's tent to meet with him, Suleiman's eunuchs attacked Mustafa, and after a long struggle the mutes killed him using a bow-string.

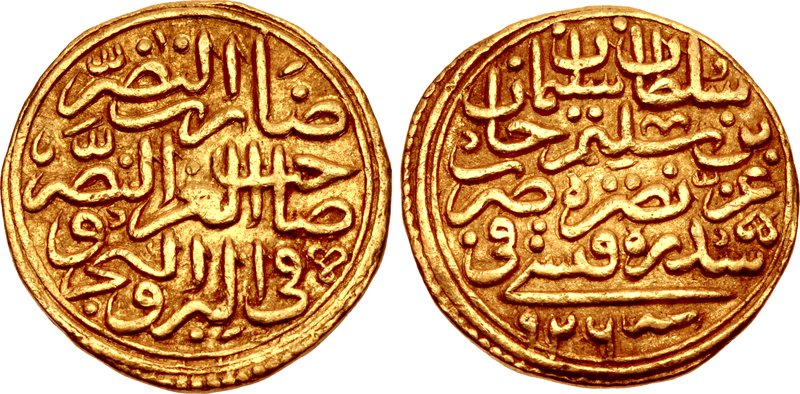
Ottoman sultani minted during the reign of Suleiman the Magnificent

Cihangir is said to have died of grief a few months after the news of his half-brother's murder. The two surviving brothers, Selim and Bayezid, were given command in different parts of the empire. Within a few years, however, civil war broke out between the brothers, each supported by his loyal forces. With the aid of his father's army, Selim defeated Bayezid in Konya in 1559, leading the latter to seek refuge with the Safavids along with his four sons. Following diplomatic exchanges, the Sultan demanded from the Safavid Shah that Bayezid be either extradited or executed. In return for large amounts of gold, the Shah allowed a Turkish executioner to strangle Bayezid and his four sons in 1561, clearing the path for Selim's succession to the throne five years later.

== Death and legacy ==
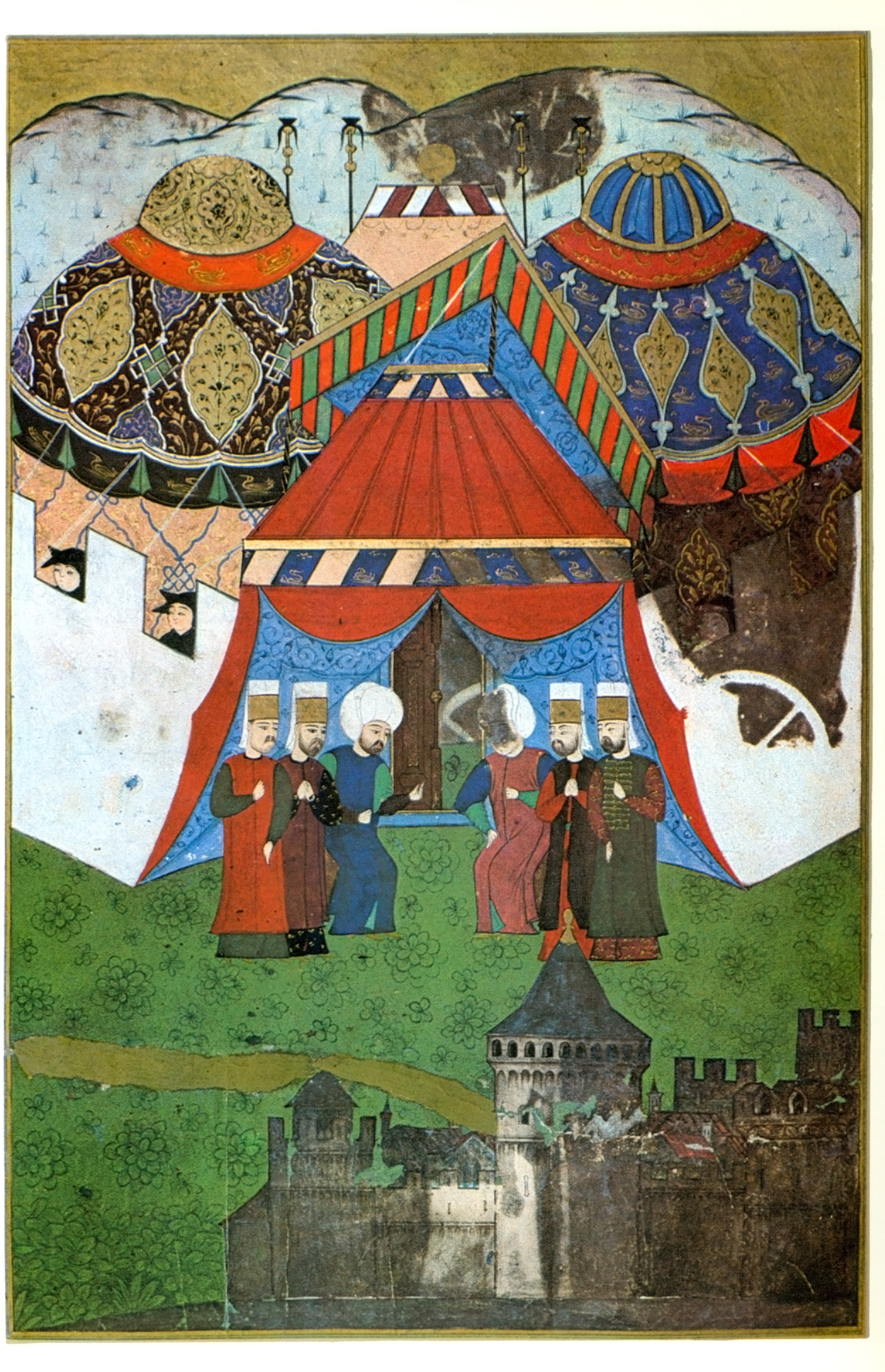
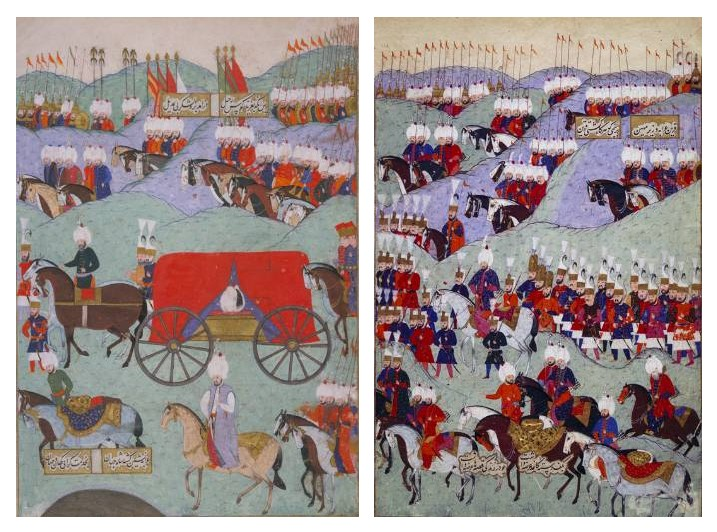
The body of Suleiman I arrives to Belgrade. (left) The funeral of Suleiman I. (right)

On 6 September 1566, Suleiman, who had set out from Constantinople to command an expedition to Hungary, died before an Ottoman victory at the siege of Szigetvár in Hungary at the age of 71 and his Grand Vizier Sokollu Mehmed Pasha kept his death secret during the retreat for the enthronement of Selim II. The sultan's body was taken back to Istanbul to be buried, while his heart, liver, and some other organs were buried in Turbék, outside Szigetvár. A mausoleum constructed above the burial site came to be regarded as a holy place and pilgrimage site. Within a decade a mosque and Sufi hospice were built near it, and the site was protected by a salaried garrison of several dozen men.

=== Legacy ===
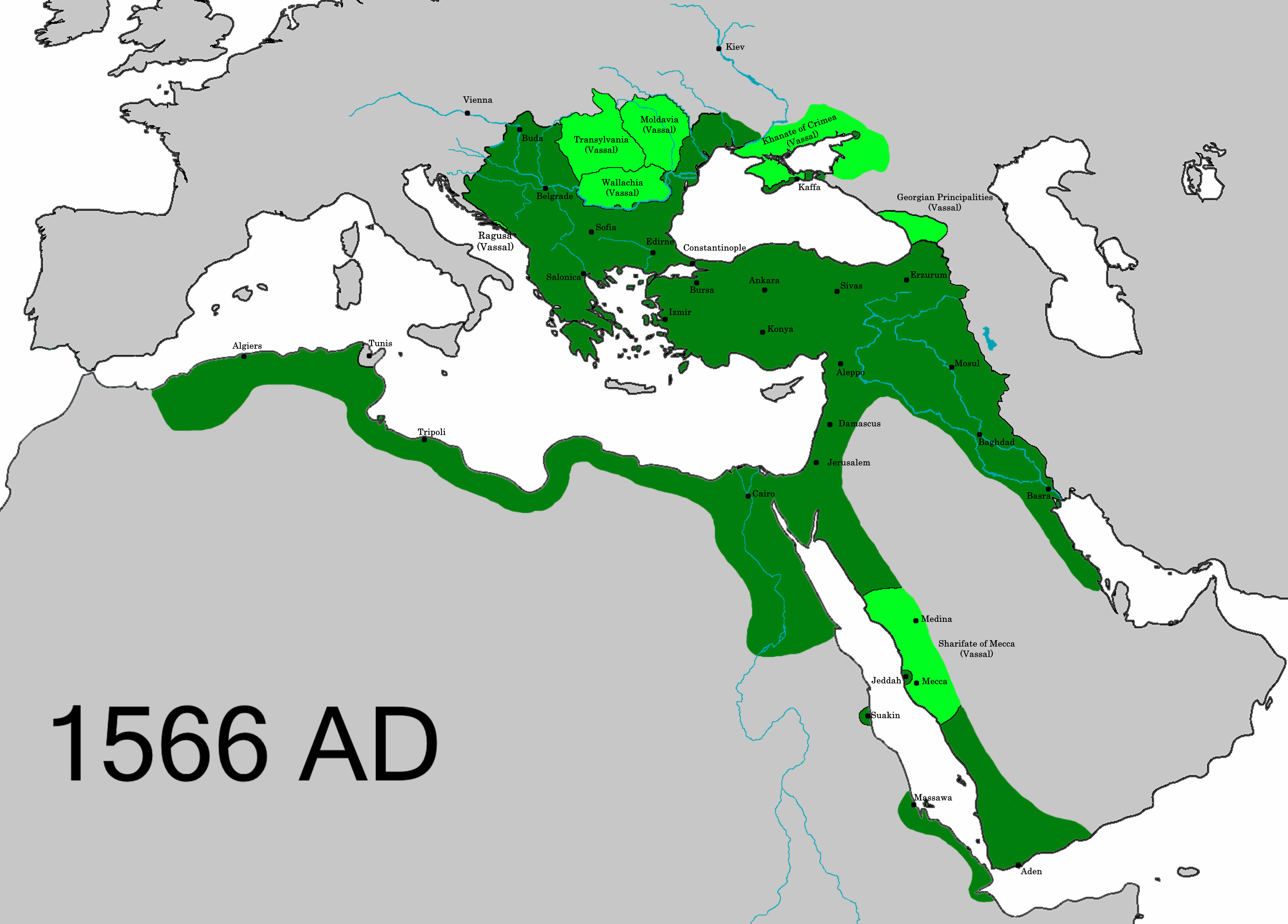
The Ottoman Empire at the time of the death of Suleiman I

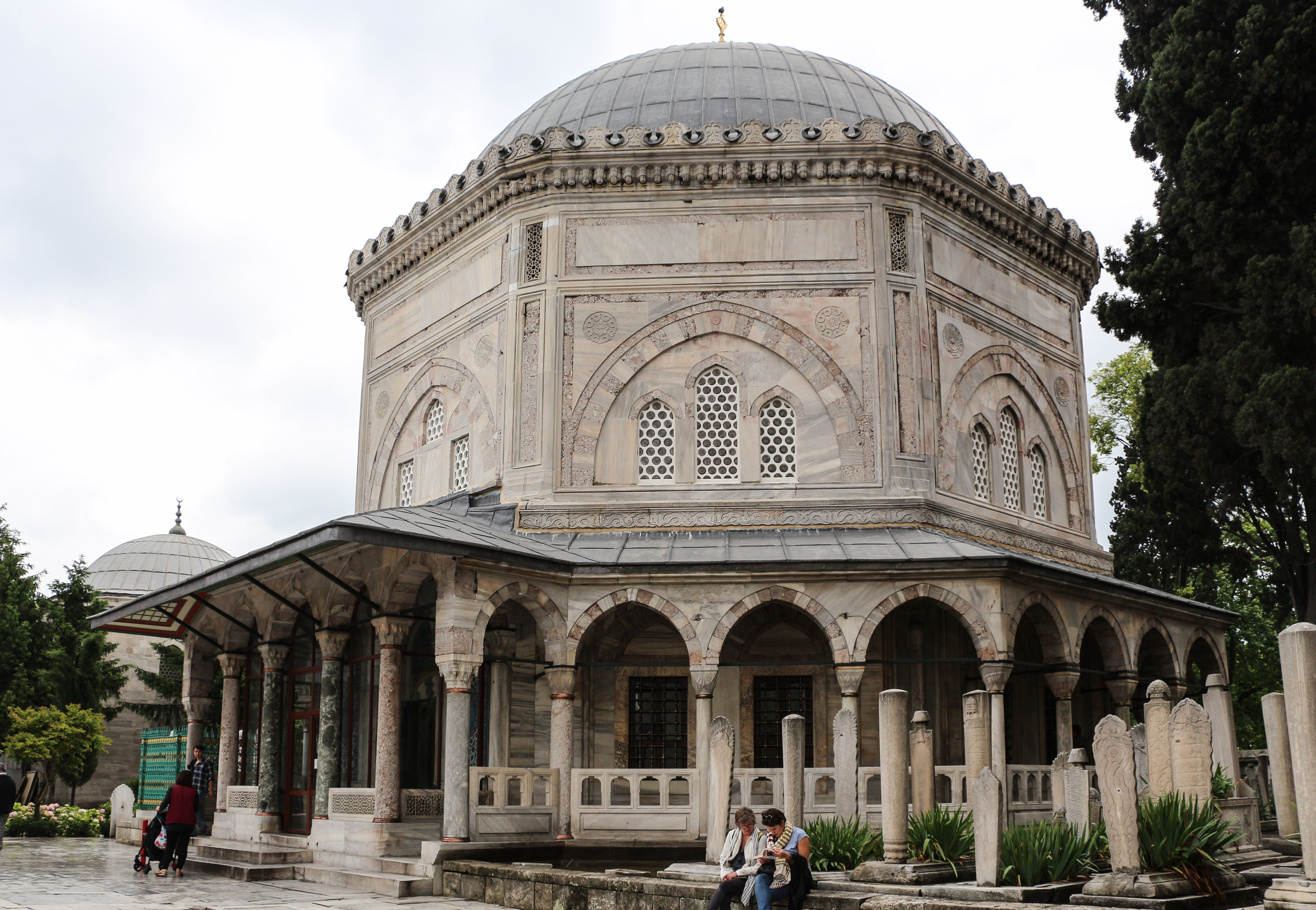
Burial place of Suleiman I at Süleymaniye Mosque

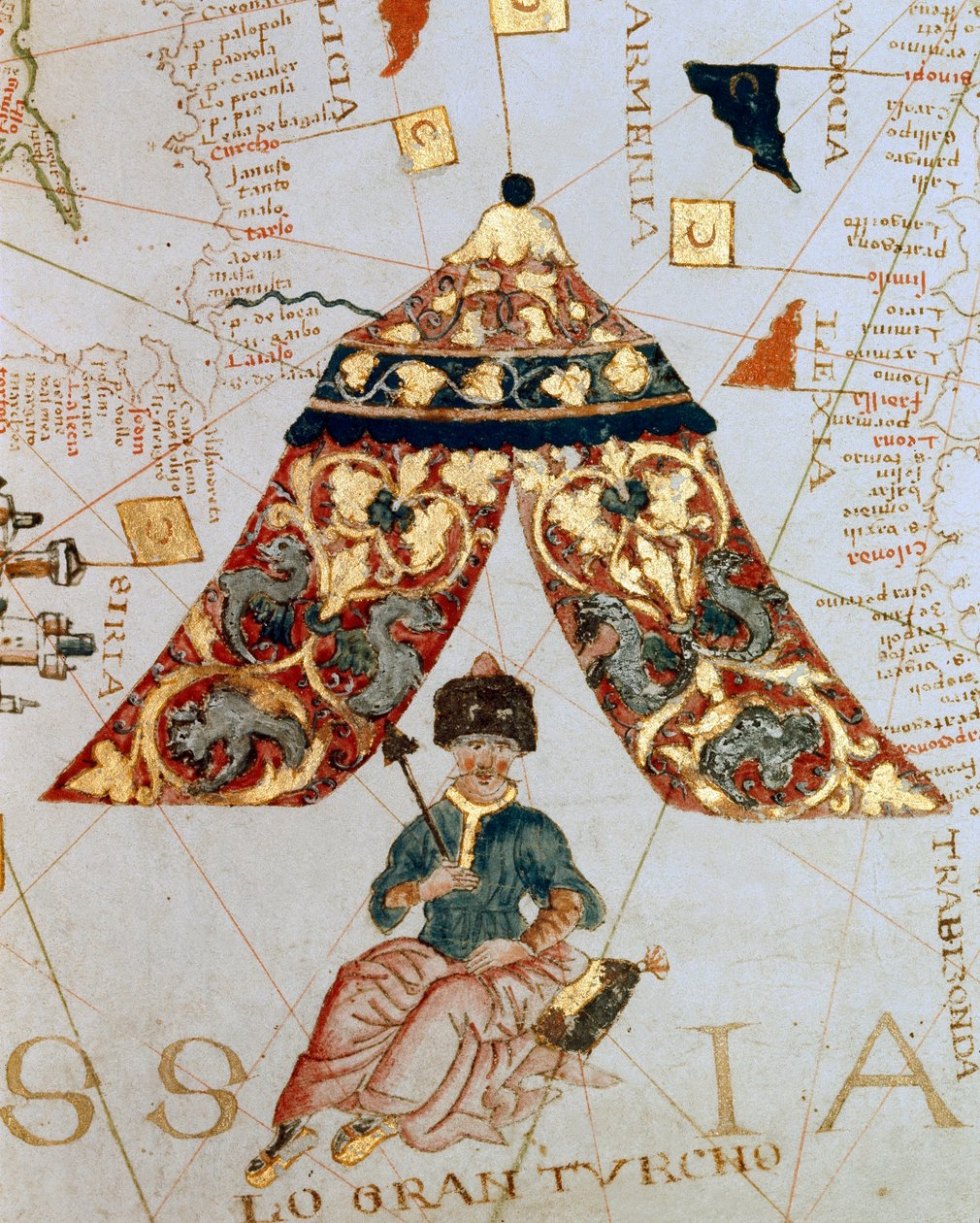
Suleiman the Magnificent, Portolan of Jacopo Russo, c.1528

The formation of Suleiman's legacy began even before his death. Throughout his reign literary works were commissioned praising Suleiman and constructing an image of him as an ideal ruler, most significantly by Celalzade Mustafa, chancellor of the empire from 1534 to 1557. Later Ottoman writers applied this idealised image of Suleiman to the Near Eastern literary genre of advice literature named naṣīḥatnāme, urging sultans to conform to his model of rulership and to maintain the empire's institutions in their sixteenth-century form. Such writers were pushing back against the political and institutional transformation of the empire after the middle of the sixteenth century, and portrayed deviation from the norm as it had existed under Suleiman as evidence of the decline of the empire. Western historians, failing to recognise that these 'decline writers' were working within an established literary genre and often had deeply personal reasons for criticizing the empire, long took their claims at face value and consequently adopted the idea that the empire entered a period of decline after the death of Suleiman. Since the 1980s this view has been thoroughly reexamined, and modern scholars have come to overwhelmingly reject the idea of decline, labelling it an "untrue myth".

Suleiman's conquests had brought under the control of the Empire major Muslim cities (such as Baghdad), many Balkan provinces (reaching present day Croatia and Hungary), and most of North Africa. His expansion into Europe had given the Ottoman Turks a powerful presence in the European balance of power. Indeed, such was the perceived threat of the Ottoman Empire under the reign of Suleiman that Austria's ambassador Busbecq warned of Europe's imminent conquest: "On [the Turks'] side are the resources of a mighty empire, strength unimpaired, habituation to victory, endurance of toil, unity, discipline, frugality and watchfulness ... Can we doubt what the result will be? ... When the Turks have settled with Persia, they will fly at our throats supported by the might of the whole East; how unprepared we are I dare not say." Suleiman's legacy was not, however, merely in the military field. The French traveler Jean de Thévenot bears witness a century later to the "strong agricultural base of the country, the well being of the peasantry, the abundance of staple foods and the pre-eminence of organization in Suleiman's government".

Even thirty years after his death, "Sultan Solyman" was quoted by the English playwright William Shakespeare as a military prodigy in The Merchant of Venice, where the Prince of Morocco boasts about his prowess by saying that he defeated Suleiman in three battles (Act 2, Scene 1).

Court patronage under Suleiman contributed to the development of Ottoman culture and artistic production, a period often described as a golden age of Ottoman art. Many religious and public buildings designed by the chief imperial architect Mimar Sinan, who served under Suleiman and his two successors, survive in Istanbul and in former Ottoman territories. Suleiman himself was buried in a domed mausoleum attached to the Süleymaniye Mosque, a major project commissioned by Suleiman and constructed between 1550 and 1557.

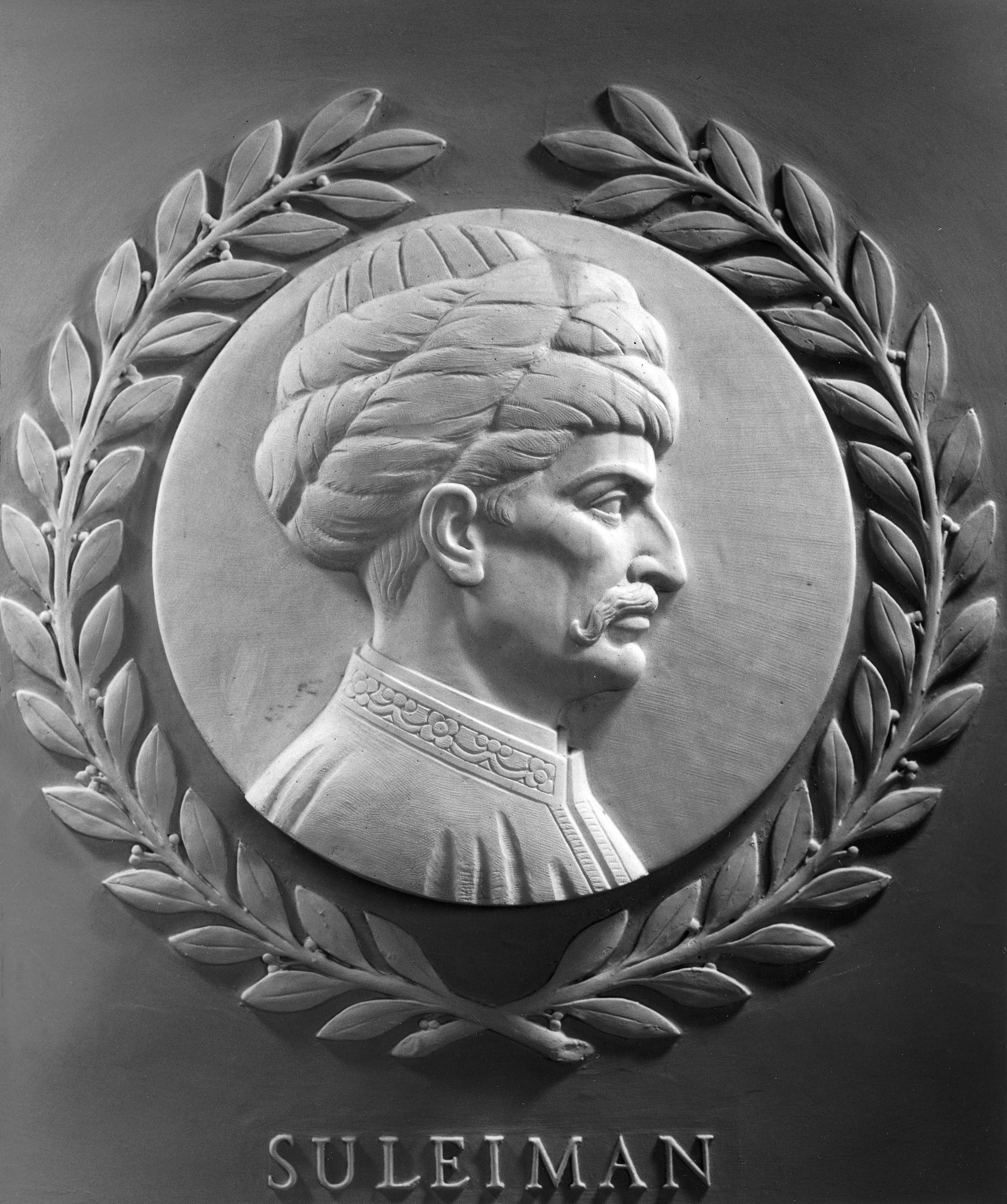
Suleiman's marble portrait in the US Capitol

Nevertheless, assessments of Suleiman's reign have frequently fallen into the trap of the Great Man theory of history. The administrative, cultural, and military achievements of the age were a product not of Suleiman alone, but also of the many talented figures who served him, such as grand viziers Ibrahim Pasha and Rüstem Pasha, the Grand Mufti Ebussuud Efendi, who played a major role in legal reform, and chancellor and chronicler Celalzade Mustafa, who played a major role in bureaucratic expansion and in constructing Suleiman's legacy.

In an inscription dating from 1537 on the citadel of Bender, Moldova, Suleiman the Magnificent gave expression to his power:

I am God's slave and sultan of this world. By the grace of God I am head of Muhammad's community. God's might and Muhammad's miracles are my companions. I am Süleymân, in whose name the hutbe is read in Mecca and Medina. In Baghdad I am the shah, in Byzantine realms the caesar, and in Egypt the sultan; who sends his fleets to the seas of Europe, the Maghrib and India. I am the sultan who took the crown and throne of Hungary and granted them to a humble slave. The voivoda Petru raised his head in revolt, but my horse's hoofs ground him into the dust, and I conquered the land of Moldovia.

Suleiman, as sculpted by Joseph Kiselewski, is present on one of the 23 relief portraits over the gallery doors of the House Chamber of the United States Capitol that depicts historical figures noted for their work in establishing the principles that underlie American law.

== See also ==
- List of revolts during Suleiman's reign
- Muhteşem Yüzyıl, TV series based on his life

== Citations ==
Suleiman the Magnificent House of Osman Born: 6 November 1494 Died: 6 September 1566
Regnal titles
Preceded by Selim I	Sultan of the Ottoman Empire; 22 September 1520 – c. 6 September 1566	Succeeded by Selim II
Sunni Islam titles
Preceded by Selim I	Caliph of the Ottoman dynasty 22 September 1520 – c. 6 September 1566	Succeeded by Selim II
