= Raziye Sultan =

Ottoman princess (c.1513 - 1520)

- Died: 1521; Constantinople, Ottoman Empire
- Burial: Yahya Efendi Türbe, Istanbul
- Dynasty: Ottoman
- Father: Suleiman the Magnificent
- Religion: Sunni Islam

Tasasız Raziye Sultan (Ottoman Turkish: راضیہ سلطان; died 1521) was an Ottoman princess, daughter of Ottoman Sultan Suleiman the Magnificent and an unknown concubine. She may have been the daughter who died in 1521 along with her half brothers Şehzade Mahmud and Şehzade Murad of an infectious disease, perhaps smallpox. She is buried at the Yahya Efendi's Tekke in Beşiktaş, Istanbul.
