= List of revolts under Suleiman the Magnificent =

During Suleiman's reign there were few major and several minor revolts throughout the Ottoman Empire. This is a list of the few major revolts.

== Revolts ==
No.	Year	Location	Notes	Image
1	1521	Damascus	Revolt by the ruler of Damascus. Selim I appointed Canberdi Gazali as a government of Damascus. After the death of Selim I, Canberdi Gazali made himself independent ruler, but Aleppo refused to join him in his revolt. Suleiman's army killed Canberdi Gazali near Damascus on 27 January 1521.	
2	1523–1524	Egypt	Revolt by the so-called the Sultan of Egypt Hain Ahmed Pasha.	
3	1525	Istanbul	revolt by Janissaries in 1525	
4	1526	Anatolia	revolt by a Baba Zünnun	
5	1526–1528	Anatolia	Disturbances in eastern Anatolia.	
6	1555	Thessaloniki	Revolt by a false Prince Mustafa.	
7	1559	Konya	Revolt by his son Şehzade Beyazıt. Prince Şehzade Beyazıt was jealous of his brother Selim II. As a consequence of his jealousy, Beyazıt raised the revolt at Konya (Konish). Suleiman made preparations for a campaign against his son Beyazıt, but he renounced campaigning upon the latter's retreat to Persia. Tahmasp I eventually sold Beyazıt and his children to the emissary of Selim, by whom they were tortured and killed.	
8	1564–1565	Mariovo and Prilep	Slavic revolt in Ottoman North Macedonia	

== Notes ==
Citations
