= Turbék =

17th century Ottoman settlement

Coordinates: 46.0714°N 17.8213°E

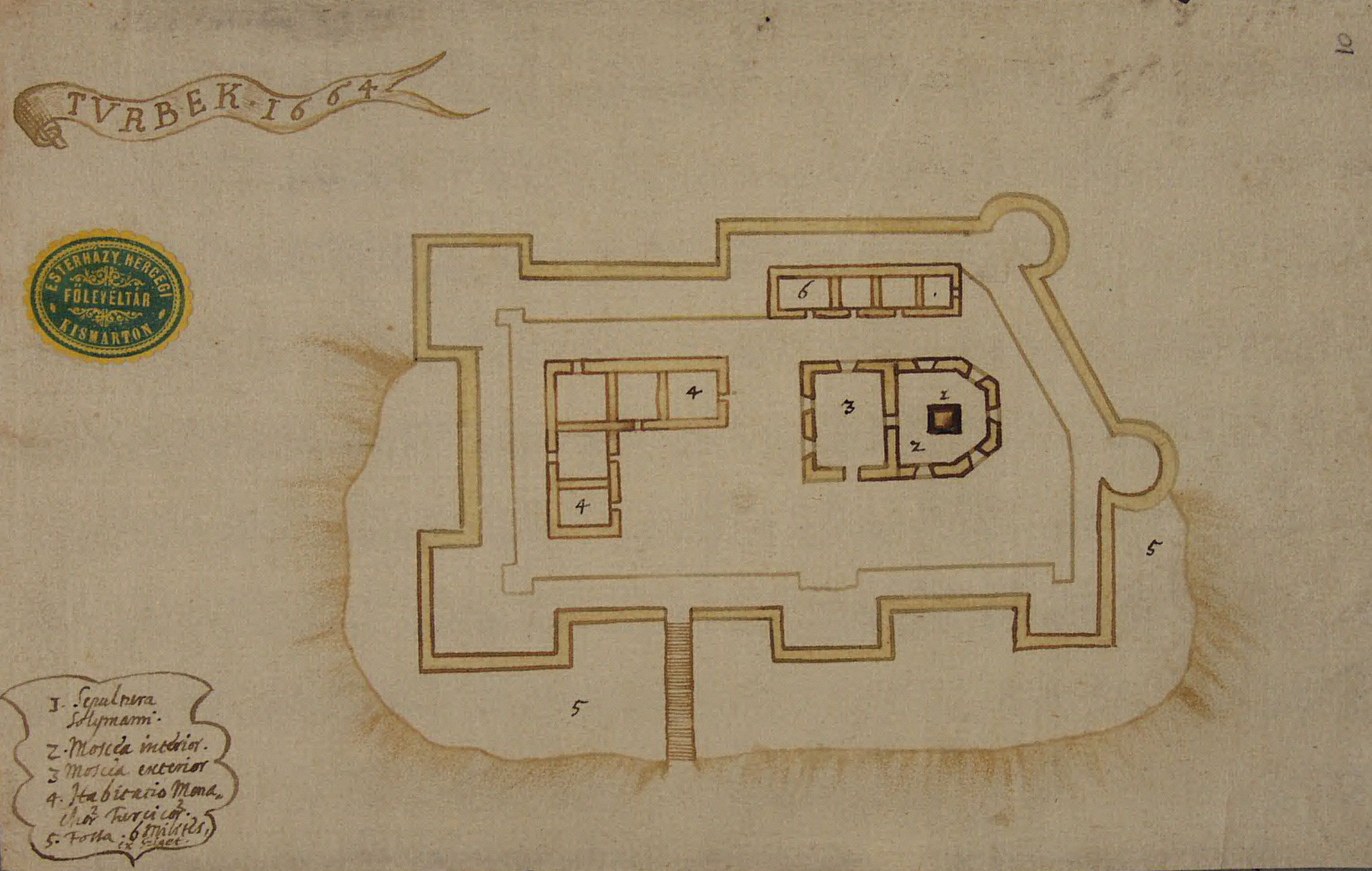
A map from the 17th century depicting the settlement of Turbék

Turbék was an Ottoman-established settlement from the 16th and 17th centuries. It was situated next to Szigetvár, Hungary. Today, its former territories belong to the town of Szigetvár. According to archaeological research, Turbék is the exact place where Sultan Suleiman the Magnificent died during the Siege of Szigetvár. A tomb (türbe) was built for Sultan Suleiman at the site where his body was kept for a short time and his heart and internal organs were reportedly buried. Later, a mosque, a dervish cloister, and a military barracks emerged around the tomb and the place became a Muslim pilgrimage site. However, in the 1680s the Habsburg troops destroyed the settlement of Turbék completely to erase any traces of the Ottomans, leaving behind stone foundations no more than 15 inches tall.

== Archaeological excavation ==
In 2015, in the town of Szigetvar in southern Hungary, geophysical examinations using ground penetrating radar revealed the foundations of five structures below the surface of a vineyard owned by Gyula Kereszturi. A 1664 sketch by Pal Esterhazy, a Hungarian military commander, purportedly showed the layout of the settlement. Using this sketch, the geographers were able to compare their findings from the geological examination and discovered their findings lined up as a near match with the sketch which showed "a mosque, an Islamic dervish monastery, and a military barracks" built around the tomb. In 2016, a team began excavating the area and unearthed the foundations of the "mausoleum complex of Suleiman the Magnificent, the Ottoman Empire's most prolific builder and accomplished military leader," including the monastery and military barracks.
