= Hyperlink cinema =

Multilinear filmmaking style

Hyperlink cinema is a style of filmmaking characterized by complex or multilinear narrative structures with multiple characters under one unifying theme. In spite of the name, these films are not actual hypermedia and do not have actual hyperlinks, but are multilinear in a more metaphorical sense.

== History ==
The term was coined by author Alissa Quart, who used the term in her review of the film Happy Endings (2005) for the film journal Film Comment in 2005. Film critic Roger Ebert popularized the term when reviewing the film Syriana in 2005.

In describing Happy Endings, Quart considers captions acting as footnotes and split screen as elements of hyperlink cinema and notes the influence of the World Wide Web and multitasking. Playing with time and characters' personal history, plot twists, interwoven storylines between multiple characters, jumping between the beginning and end (flashback and flashforward) are also elements. Ebert further described hyperlink cinema as films where the characters or action reside in separate stories, but a connection or influence between those disparate stories is slowly revealed to the audience; illustrated in Mexican director Alejandro González Iñárritu's films Amores perros (2000), 21 Grams (2003), and Babel (2006).

Quart suggests that director Robert Altman created the structure for the genre and demonstrated its usefulness for combining interlocking stories in his films Nashville (1975) and Short Cuts (1993). However, his work was predated by several films, including Satyajit Ray's Kanchenjunga (1962), Federico Fellini's Amarcord (1973), and Ritwik Ghatak's Titash Ekti Nadir Naam (1973), all of which use a narrative structure based on multiple characters.

Quart also mentions the television series 24 and discusses Alan Rudolph's film Welcome to L.A. (1976) as an early prototype. Crash (2004) is an example of the genre, as are Steven Soderbergh's Traffic (2000), Fernando Meirelles's City of God (2002), Stephen Gaghan's Syriana (2005) and Rodrigo Garcia's Nine Lives (2005).

The style is also used in video games. French video game company Quantic Dream has produced games, such as Heavy Rain and Detroit: Become Human, with hyperlink cinema style storytelling, and the style has also influenced role-playing games such as Suikoden III (2001) and Octopath Traveler (2018).

== Analysis ==
The hyperlink cinema narrative and story structure can be compared to social science's spatial analysis. As described by Edward Soja and Costis Hadjimichalis spatial analysis examines the "'horizontal experience' of human life, the spatial dimension of individual behavior and social relations, as opposed to the 'vertical experience' of history, tradition, and biography." English critic John Berger notes for the novel that "it is scarcely any longer possible to tell a straight story sequentially unfolding in time" for "we are too aware of what is continually traversing the story line laterally."

An academic analysis of hyperlink cinema appeared in the journal Critical Studies in Media Communication, and referred to the films as Global Network Films. Narine's study examines the films Traffic (2000), Amores perros (2000), 21 Grams (2003), Beyond Borders (2003), Crash (2004; released 2005), Syriana (2005), Babel (2006) and others, citing network theorist Manuel Castells and philosophers Michel Foucault and Slavoj Žižek. The study suggests that the films are network narratives that map the network society and the new connections citizens experience in the age of globalization.

Alberto Toscano and Jeff Kinkle have argued that one popular form of hyperlink cinema constitutes a contemporary form of it-narrative, an 18th- and 19th-century genre of fiction written from the imagined perspective of objects as they move between owners and social environments. In these films, they argue, "the narrative link is the characters' relation to the film's product of choice, whether it be guns, cocaine, oil, or Nile perch."

== Notable examples ==
=== Films ===
- Grand Hotel (1932)
- Dinner at Eight (1933)
- The Rules of the Game (1939)
- Kanchenjunga (1962)
- Is Paris Burning? (1966)
- Amarcord (1973)
- Titash Ekti Nadir Naam (1973)
- The Phantom of Liberty (1974)
- Zavallılar (1974)
- Nashville (1975)
- Welcome to L.A. (1976)
- Ganadevata (1978)
- Yol (1982)
- Hannah and Her Sisters (1986)
- Do the Right Thing (1989)
- Mystery Train (1989)
- Grand Canyon (1991)
- Slacker (1991)
- Dazed and Confused (1993)
- Short Cuts (1993)
- Three Colours: Red (1993)
- Padma Nadir Majhi (1993)
- Before the Rain (1994)
- Exotica (1994)
- Pulp Fiction (1994)
- Gummo (1997)
- Lock, Stock and Two Smoking Barrels (1998)
- The Opposite of Sex (1998)
- Happiness (1998)
- Playing by Heart (1998)
- Run Lola Run (1998)
- Go (1999)
- Magnolia (1999)
- Code Unknown (2000)
- Timecode (2000)
- Amores perros (2000)
- Snatch (2000)
- Traffic (2000)
- Lantana (2001)
- Thirteen Conversations About One Thing (2001)
- City of God (2002)
- 11:14 (2003)
- Elephant (2003)
- Love Actually (2003)
- 21 Grams (2003)
- Cape of Good Hope (2004)
- Crash (2004)
- Happy Endings (2005)
- Syriana (2005)
- Nine Lives (2005)
- Sin City (2005)
- Inland Empire (2006)
- Look Both Ways (2006)
- Babel (2006)
- The Edge of Heaven (2007)
- Rendition (2007)
- You, the Living (2007)
- The Air I Breathe (2008)
- Gomorrah (2008)
- Vantage Point (2008)
- Ajami (2009)
- Powder Blue (2009)
- Watchmen (2009)
- Hereafter (2010)
- Answers to Nothing (2011)
- Traffic (2011)
- Contagion (2011)
- Cloud Atlas (2012)
- Disconnect (2012)
- The Big Short (2015)
- Masaan (2015)
- Dunkirk (2017)
- Everything Everywhere All at Once (2022)
- Bullet Train (2022)
- Sila Nerangalil Sila Manidhargal (2022)
- Chow Chow Bath (2024)
- Weapons (2025)

=== Video games ===
- Suikoden III (2001)
- Indigo Prophecy (2005)
- Heavy Rain (2010)
- Resident Evil 6 (2012)
- Until Dawn (2015)
- Octopath Traveler (2018)
- Detroit: Become Human (2018)

=== Directors associated with hyperlink cinema ===
- Paul Thomas Anderson
- Satyajit Ray
- Alejandro González Iñárritu
- Quentin Tarantino
- Goutam Ghose
- Tarun Majumdar
- Garry Marshall
- Robert Altman
- The Wachowskis
- Tom Tykwer
- Yılmaz Güney
- Steven Soderbergh
- Richard Linklater
- Paul Haggis

== See also ==
- Anthology film
- Composite film
- Ensemble cast
- Nonlinear (arts)
