= List of Turkish film directors =

This is a list of Turkish film directors.

- Ahmet Can Tekin – filmmaker and director
- Ali Atay – film director and actor
- Ali Özgentürk – film director
- Ali Taner Baltacı – film director and screenwriter
- Alper Mestçi – screenwriter, film director and author
- Aslı Özge – film director, screenwriter and producer
- Atıf Yılmaz – film director (1925–2006)
- Ayşe Polat – German-Kurdish film director
- Aysim Türkmen – film director and documentarian
- Ayten Kuyululu – film director, opera singer, actress and screenwriter
- Azra Deniz Okyay – film director, screenwriter and producer
- Banu Sıvacı – film director, screenwriter and producer
- Belmin Söylemez – film director, screenwriter and producer
- Berrin Dağçınar – film director and screenwriter
- Biket İlhan – film director and producer
- Bilge Olgaç – film director and screenwriter
- Çağan Irmak – film director
- Can Evrenol – film director and screenwriter
- Cem Yılmaz – film director, screenwriter, producer and actor
- Çetin İnanç – film director
- Ceyda Aslı Kılıçkıran – film director and screenwriter
- Ceylan Özgün Özçelik – film director and screenwriter
- Deniz Gamze Ergüven – Turkish-French film director
- Derviş Zaim – novelist and filmmaker (Turkish Cypriot) (born 1964)
- Duygu Sağıroğlu – film director and screenwriter
- Emin Alper – film director, screenwriter and producer
- Emre Şahin, film director
- Emre Yeksan – film director and producer
- Engin Ayça – film director and screenwriter
- Erdem Tepegöz – film director, screenwriter and producer
- Erol Mintaş – film director and screenwriter
- Ertem Eğilmez – film director (1929–1989)
- Ertem Göreç – film director
- Faruk Aksoy – film director and producer
- Fatih Akın – German film director of Turkish descent
- Ferzan Özpetek – film director
- Feyzi Tuna – film director and screenwriter
- Fikret Reyhan – film director and screenwriter
- Fırat Gümüştekin – film director, cinematographer and screenwriter
- Fuat Uzkınay – film director (1889–1956)
- Gani Müjde – film director and screenwriter
- Haldun Dormen – film director, actor
- Halit Refiğ – film director (1934–2009)
- Handan İpekçi – film director, screenwriter and producer
- Hasan Karacadağ – film director, producer and screenwriter
- Hüseyin Karabey – film director and producer
- İrfan Tözüm – film director and producer
- Işıl Özgentürk – film director and screenwriter
- Kaan Müjdeci – film director and screenwriter
- Kartal Tibet – film director, actor
- Kıvanç Sezer – film director and screenwriter
- Kutluğ Ataman – film director
- Mahsun Kırmızıgül – film director, screenwriter, producer and actor
- Mehmet Bozdağ – film director
- Mehmet Can Mertoğlu – film director and screenwriter
- Memduh Ün – film director
- Mennan Yapo – director, screenwriter, producer and actor
- Metin Erksan – film director
- Mu Tunc – film director
- Muammer Özer – film director, screenwriter and producer
- Muhsin Ertuğrul – film director (1892–1979)
- Murat Aslan – film director and screenwriter
- Murat Düzgünoğlu – film director, screenwriter and producer
- Murat Saraçoğlu – film director and screenwriter
- Murat Şeker – film director, screenwriter and producer
- Mustafa Altıoklar – film director, producer
- Nesli Çölgeçen – film director and screenwriter
- Nuri Bilge Ceylan – film director
- Ömer Faruk Sorak – film director and producer
- Ömer Kavur – film director (1944–2005)
- Ömer Lütfi Akad – film director
- Ömer Uğur – film director and screenwriter
- Ömür Kınay – disabled female short film director
- Onur Saylak – film director, actor and producer
- Orhan Aksoy – film director and screenwriter
- Osman Fahir Seden – film director (1924–1998)
- Osman Sınav – film director
- Ozan Açıktan – film director and screenwriter
- Özcan Alper – film director and screenwriter
- Pelin Esmer – film director, screenwriter and producer
- Ramin Matin – film director and cinematographer
- Reha Erdem – film director
- Remzi Aydın Jöntürk, film director, producer and writer (1938–1988)
- Sabri Kalic – film director
- Selman Nacar – film director and producer
- Semih Kaplanoğlu – film director
- Serdar Akar – film director, screenwriter and producer
- Seren Yüce – film director and screenwriter
- Serhat Karaaslan – film director and screenwriter
- Seyfi Teoman – film director and screenwriter
- Şahin Gök – film director
- Şahin Kaygun – film director and photographer
- Şenol Sönmez – film director and screenwriter
- Şerif Gören – film director
- Sinan Çetin – film director
- Süha Arın – film director
- Togan Gökbakar – film director
- Tolga Karaçelik – film director, screenwriter and producer
- Tomris Giritlioğlu – film director and producer
- Tunç Başaran – film director (1938–2019)
- Türkan Şoray – actress and film director
- Türker İnanoğlu – film director
- Uğur Yücel – film director, actor and producer
- Yavuz Özkan – film director
- Yavuz Turgul – film director
- Yeşim Ustaoğlu – film director and screenwriter
- Yılmaz Atadeniz – film director, producer and screenwriter
- Yılmaz Erdoğan – film director, actor
- Yılmaz Güney – Turkish-Kurdish film director
- Yüksel Aksu – film director, screenwriter and producer
- Yücel Çakmaklı – film director and screenwriter
- Yusuf Kurçenli – film director, producer and screenwriter
- Zeki Alasya – film director, actor
- Zeki Demirkubuz – film director
- Zeki Ökten – film director
- Zeynep Dadak – film director, screenwriter and producer
- Zülfü Livaneli – film director, composer
