= Tuncel Kurtiz =

Turkish actor and director (1936–2013)

- Born: 1 February 1936; Kocaeli Province, Turkey
- Died: 27 September 2013 (aged 77); Etiler, Istanbul, Turkey
- Education: English philology
- Alma mater: Istanbul University
- Occupations: Actor, playwright and film producer
- Years active: 1958–2013
- Spouse: Menend Kurtiz
- Awards: Golden Orange Award for Best Screenplay (1981); Golden Orange Award for Best Supporting Actor (1994); Golden Boll Award for Best Supporting Actor (1994); Golden Orange Award for Best Supporting Actor (2007)

Tuncel Tayanç Kurtiz (1 February 1936 – 27 September 2013) was a Turkish theatre, movie and TV series actor, playwright, and film director. From 1964 until his death in 2013, he acted in more than 70 movies, including many international productions.

== Early years ==
He was born in Bahçecik, Kocaeli, a town in Turkey. His father was a district governor (kaymakam). His mother was a teacher and of Bosniak descent. His parents' occupation was the reason the family lived in many places across the country over the years. After graduating from the Haydarpaşa High School in Istanbul, Kurtiz studied English philology at Istanbul University.

== Career ==
He soon started a career as a theatre actor actor. From 1958, Kurtiz performed on many stages in Istanbul, in state and private theatres. He was also on the stage at Gothenburg City Theatre, Stockholm Royal Theatre and Swedish Theatre in Sweden, Schaubühne Berlin, Frankfurt City Theatre and Hamburg City Theatre in Germany and at Peter Brook Shakespeare Royal Theatre in England. Kurtiz directed plays for the German-Turkish theatre project "Türkisches Ensemble" in the late 1970s.

During his university years and the military service period, he became friends with the renowned film director Yılmaz Güney. They made a number of films together. Their 1970 film Umut was prohibited from leaving Turkey, but a smuggled copy was shown at the Cannes Film Festival.

His first film role was in Şeytanın Uşakları, shot in 1964. Since then, Tuncel Kurtiz played also in many international productions like Swedish, German, Dutch, Italian, French, British, Israel and Indian films and TV series, mostly in the original language.

== Death ==
Tuncel Kurtiz died at the age of 77 on 27 September 2013 following a fall-inflicted head trauma in his residence in Etiler, Istanbul.

== Filmography ==
- Mutlu Aile Defteri (Happy Family Journal) (2013)
- Inadına Film Çekmek (Film Against All Odds) (2010)
- Black and White (Siyah Beyaz) (2010)
- Pains of Autumn (Güz Sancısı) (2009)
- Jack Hunter And The Quest For Akhenaten (2008)
- The Edge of Heaven by Fatih Akın (2007 - Turkey-Germany)
- A Cavallo della Tigre (Esaretten Kaçış) by Carlo Mazzacurati (2002 - Italy)
- Şellale (The Waterfall) by Semir Aslanyürek (2001)
- Hoşçakal Yarın by Reis Çelik (1998)
- Sawdust Tales by Barış Pirhasan (1997 - Turkey/Germany/Hungary)
- Gräfin Sophia Hatun by Ayşe Polat (1997 - Germany)
- Akrebin Yolculuğu by Ömer Kavur (1997)
- Vive la mariée... et la libération du Kurdistan by Hiner Saleem (1997 - France)
- Somersault in a Coffin by Derviş Zaim (1996)
- Dunkle Schatten der Angst by Konstantin Schmidt (1993 - Germany)
- Die Hallo-Sisters by Ottokar Runze (1990 - Germany)
- Zeit der Rache by Anton Peschke (1990 - Germany)
- Skyddsängeln by Suzanne Osten (1990 - Sweden)
- Täcknamn Coq Rouge by Per Berglund (1989 - Sweden)
- The Mahabharata by Peter Brook (1989 - India)
- Livsfarlig film by Suzanne Osten (1989 - Sweden)
- Aufbrüche by Hartmut Horst and Eckart Lottmann (1987 - Germany)
- Den Frusna leoparden by Lárus Ýmir Óskarsson (1986 - Sweden)
- Hiuch HaGdi by Shimon Dotan (1986 - Israel)
- Turkse Video by Otakar Votocek (1984 - Netherlands)
- Kalabaliken i Bender by Mats Arehn (1983 - Sweden)
- Duvar (The Wall) by Yılmaz Güney (1983)
- Kleiner Mann was tun by Uschi Madeisky and Klaus Werner (1981 - West Germany)
- On Fertile Lands by Erden Kıral (1980)
- Kanal by Erden Kıral (1978)
- Sürü (The Herd) by Zeki Ökten (1978)
- Umut by Şerif Gören and Yılmaz Güney (1970)
- Karaoğlan Camoka'nın Intikami (Karaoğlan Camoka's Revenge) (1966)
- Hıçkırık (1965)
- Şeytanın Uşakları by İlhan Engin (1964)

=== TV series ===
- Muhteşem Yüzyıl (2012–2013)
- Ezel (2009–2011)
- Asi (2007–2009)
- Kara Duvak (2007)
- Hacı (2006)
- "Vägen till Gyllenblå!" (1985 - Sweden)
- Die Abschiebung by Marianne Lüdcke (1985 - West Germany)
- Tatort - Tod im U-Bahnschacht (1975 - West Germany)

=== Directed movie ===
- Lyckliga vi... (1980 - Turkey/Sweden)

== Awards ==
- "Best Screenplay" at 1981 Antalya Film Festival for his script Gül Hasan
- "Best Actor" at the 36th Berlin International Film Festival for his role in the Israel film Hiuch HaGdi
- "Best Supporting Actor" at 1994 Antalya Film Festival for his role in Bir Aşk Uğruna
- "Best Actor" at 7th Sadri Alışık Awards for his role in Şellale
- "Best Supporting Actor" at 2007 Antalya Film Festival for his role in Yaşamın Kıyısında

Awards
Preceded by event not held	Golden Orange Award for Best Screenplay; 1981 for Gül Hasan shared with Nurettin Sezer	Succeeded by Yavuz Turgul
Preceded by Fikret Hakan	Golden Orange Award for Best Supporting Actor; 1994 for Bir Aşk Uğruna shared with Oktay Kaynarca	Succeeded by Mustafa Avkıran
Preceded by Macit Koper	Golden Boll Award for Best Supporting Actor; 1994 for Agrıya Dönüş shared with Fikret Hakan; 1995 for Bir Aşk Uğruna	Succeeded by Kenan Bal
Preceded by Civan Canova	Golden Orange Award for Best Supporting Actor; 2007 for Yaşamın Kıyısında	Succeeded by incumbent
