= Halil Ergün =

Turkish actor

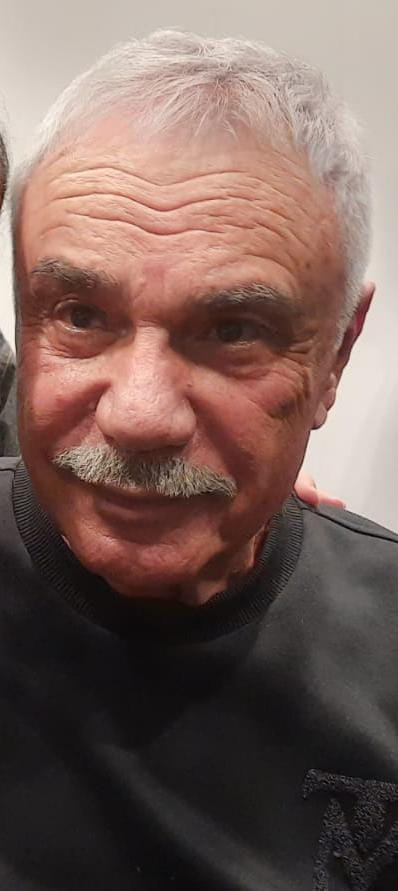
- Born: Halil İbrahim Ergün; 8 September 1946 (age 79); İznik, Turkey
- Education: Ankara University, Faculty of Political Science
- Occupation: Actor
- Awards: 1995 "Best Actor" Golden Orange; 1995 "Best Actor" Adana Golden Boll Film Festival; 1996 "Best Actor" Adana Golden Boll Film Festival; 2007 "Life Achievement" Golden Orange

Halil İbrahim Ergün (born 8 September 1946), better known as Halil Ergün, is a Turkish stage, movie, and television series actor.

He studied political science at Ankara University. Halil began his theater career in Bursa. Ergün debuted in cinema with director Yilmaz Güney in 1974. Ergün played in many important movies, including Maden, Kuma, Hamam and Kalbin zamanı. He has performed in more than 80 roles in theater and cinema. In 2006, he starred in the popular television series Yaprak Dökümü as Ali Rıza Bey.

Ergün was honored with "Best Actor" award in the theater and cinema, including from Golden Orange Film Festival in 1995 for "Böcek" and from Adana Golden Boll Film Festival in 1995 for "Böcek" and again in 1996 for "Mum Kokulu Kadınlar". He received an honorary lifelong achievement award in 2007 from Golden Orange Film Festival.

== Works ==
=== Movies ===
- Izin (1975)
- Merhaba (1976)
- Maden (1978)
- Kuma (1979) (TV movie)
- Yolcular (1979)
- Kırık bir aşk hikayesi (1981)
- Yol (1982)
- Mem u Zin (1991)
- Şalvar davası (1983)
- Güneş doğarken (1984)
- Kırlangıç fırtınası (1985)
- Bekçi (1985)
- Gülüşan (1985)
- 72. koğuş (1987)
- Katırcılar (1987)
- Filim Bitti (1989)
- Boynu bükük küheylan (1990)
- Gün ortasında karanlık (1990)
- Suyun öte yanı (1991)
- Zombie and the Ghost Train (1991)
- Uzlaşma (1992)
- Düğün - Die Heirat (1993)
- Yolcu (1994)
- Böcek (1995)
- Mum kokulu kadınlar (1996)
- Hollywood kaçakları (1997)
- Hamam (1997)
- Yara (1998)
- Der Schatz, der vom Himmel fiel (1999)
- Şöhret sandalı (2001)
- Abdülhamid düşerken (2003)
- Kalbin zamanı (2004)
- Yolda - Rüzgar geri getirirse (2005)
- Bayrampaşa: Ben fazla kalmayacağım (2007)
- Mülteci (2007)
- Yeşilçam Denizi Yenisem (2008)
- Görünmeyen (2011)
- Gün Aksam Oldu (2011)
- Koyverdin Gittin Beni (2015)
- Mum Sönmedi (2016)
- Aşkın Kanatları (2016)
- Çirkin Kral Efsanesi (2017)
- Acı Kiraz (2020)
- Yapayalnız (2021)
- Sivasliyih Gardas (2022)
- Dedemin Gözyaşları (2024)

=== Television series ===
- Küçük ağa (1983)
- Baba evi (1997–2001)
- Pembe patikler (2002)
- Büyük yalan (2004–2006)
- Kırmızı Işık (2008)
- Yaprak Dökümü (2006–2010)
- Bana Sevmeyi Anlat (2016)
- Misafir (2021)
- Gönül Dağı (2022)
- Güzel Aşklar Diyarı (2024)

=== Screenplay ===
- Merhaba (1976)
- Kırlangıç fırtınası (1985)

== Awards ==
- 1995 "Best Actor" International Antalya Golden Orange Film Festival
- 1995 "Best Actor" International Adana Golden Boll Film Festival
- 1996 "Best Actor" International Adana Golden Boll Film Festival
- 2007 "Life Achievement" International Antalya Golden Orange Film Festival
