= Umut (film) =

- Directed by: Yılmaz Güney
- Written by: Yılmaz Güney
- Produced by: Güney Film
- Starring: Yılmaz Güney; Tuncel Kurtiz; Osman Alyanak; Enver Dönmez; Gülsen Alnıaçık; Kürşat Alnıaçık
- Production company: Güney Film
- Distributed by: Filmpot
- Release date: 1970
- Running time: 100 minutes
- Country: Turkey
- Language: Turkish

Umut is a 1970 Turkish drama film, written and directed by Yılmaz Güney, featuring Güney as an illiterate horse-cab driver, who, after losing one of his horses in an accident, sets out into the desert on a quest for a mythical lost treasure. The film, which wasn't released at the time because of a ban by the Film Control Commission in Turkey, won awards at the 2nd Adana Golden Boll Film Festival, the 7th Antalya Golden Orange Film Festival and was screened at the 23rd Cannes Film Festival.

== Overview ==
Filming of Umut began in April 1970 in Çukurova, Turkey following the director's return from military service. Güney wanted Umut to be a film showing the defects and contradictions of a reality without any actualization of a revolution and the illness of the socio-economic system of its time.

Umut has a reputation for being the archetype of the revolutionist cinema and neo-realism stream in Turkey. The film has been compared to films of Roberto Rossellini, Vittorio De Sica and Cesare Zavattini. Cinema critics wrote about Güney's Umut in comparison with Ladri di Biciclette by De Sica and Zavattini, an Italian production shot in 1948, which captured the Oscar prize in 1950 and is an important example of the Italian neo-realism stream.

== Plot ==
The protagonist of the film is Cabbar (performed by Güney), who has to support his crowded Turkish family – six children, a wife, and a grandmother – with the earnings from an old phaeton with two exhausted, half-dead horses. The family tries to survive in a damp and dingy living-quarters. Cabbar does not have a good run of business. He is indebted to almost everyone. His single hope is in the lottery tickets that he buys frequently.

Life is getting harder day by day. One day, a fancy Mercedes-Benz hits one of his two horses. In this traffic accident, his horse dies. Cabbar is innocent but weak as well. This accident makes him see that the established order is accorded to the "poor and strong". The police find him guilty.

Henceforth, he sells a few sticks. He manages to get enough money to buy a new horse. In the meantime, the creditors sell the phaeton and the horse, and share the money – according to the debts of Cabber – among themselves.

Cabbar is plunged into despair. A friend of Cabbar, Hasan, has been waiting for the turning up of a buried treasure for Cabbar. In his helplessness, Cabbar lends himself to Hasan's illusions. After a preacher's faith healing sessions, Cabbar, Hasan, and the preacher go after the treasure. In the second half of the film, this search for the unfindable treasure is narrated. This search is a natural continuity of the gradually worsening events, which makes Cabbar take refuge on the preacher, in whom he had no belief at all at the beginning of the film.

Güney set down three alternatives for Cabbar: First, he goes after the preacher and searches for the treasure; second, he continues to show attitude of expectancy in the lottery tickets; third, he takes part in an organized opposition with other phaeton drivers. However, Cabbar runs away from political and social activities and he becomes a victim of empty promises. He escapes realities and looks for shelter in fantasies. Güney could make Cabbar politically conscious, even make him the leader of this opposition, and lastly lead him to success or failure, but Güney chose to leave his protagonist blind.

The film finishes with an interesting and striking scene. Cabbar, who left his wife, children, and mother in a desperate search for treasure, opens his hands to a God, whom he does not know. He begins to turn around in the middle of arid lands. He has gone mad.

== Analysis ==
Güney asserted before any political action can be organized to change the economic system, the would-be actors must abandon the idea that they possess a self profoundly different from other selves, that they pursue a destiny which is uniquely their own as individuals. The basic aim of Umut is to demonstrate that people who fight alone have no alternative but to place their trust in luck (lottery) and magic (treasure hunting). Briefly, Güney tried to show ideology as ideology to those who would claim that Cabbar's situation is a natural state of affairs. As Althusser has stated, consciousness of an ideology as ideology, is the moment in which ideology explodes, revealing the reality it had obscured.

This film, which carries some traces from Güney's own life, manifested itself with its ability to describe the story with an extraordinary reality. Güney believed that in order to reflect the truth of his narrative, his audiences must be able to witness the realities of the streets the protagonist wanders through. Thus, the people shown in Umut are mostly real people, not actors or actresses, and having not prepared film sets nor lighting, the shown environment and living conditions are also real. Through this film, Güney introduces a kind of documentarism into the Turkish cinema.

As a neo-realism movie maker, Güney created a cinema, where the audience is able to interpret the end of the film in whatever direction they want. For instance, there are no definite ends in neo-realism, likewise, Umut’s end is not definite either; the future is uncertain.

Stylistically, Umut starts off as an exercise in stark realism, and gradually shifts to a more mytho-poetic register. Despite numerous awards and a theatrical run, the film was eventually deemed politically subversive and banned for a period by the authorities, which only helped make Güney even more popular than before among viewers. The prohibition of the film is a very good case to determine the social, economic, and political conditions of Turkey in the 1970s. Although prohibited, a copy of the film was smuggled abroad and showed at Cannes Film Festival. Afterwards, with the state council's final decision the film was featured in Turkey as well as abroad, and attracted great attention. With this film, Güney captured prizes in Altın Portakal and Adana Film Festivals as best actor.

== Awards won ==
- Best film, 2nd Adana Golden Boll Film Festival, 1970
- Best director, 2nd Adana Golden Boll Film Festival, 1970
- Best scenario, 2nd Adana Golden Boll Film Festival, 1970
- Best actor, 2nd Adana Golden Boll Film Festival, 1970
- Best photography (Kaya Ererez), 2nd Adana Golden Boll Film Festival, 1970
- Best actor, Antalya Golden Orange Film Festival
- Selectors' Commission Special Prize, Grenoble Film Festival

Awards
Preceded by Kuyu	Golden Boll Award for Best Picture; 1970	Succeeded by Ağıt
