= Hirami Ahmet Pasha Mosque =

Mosque in Istanbul, Turkey

Hirami Ahmet Pasha Mosque Hırami Ahmet Paşa Mescidi
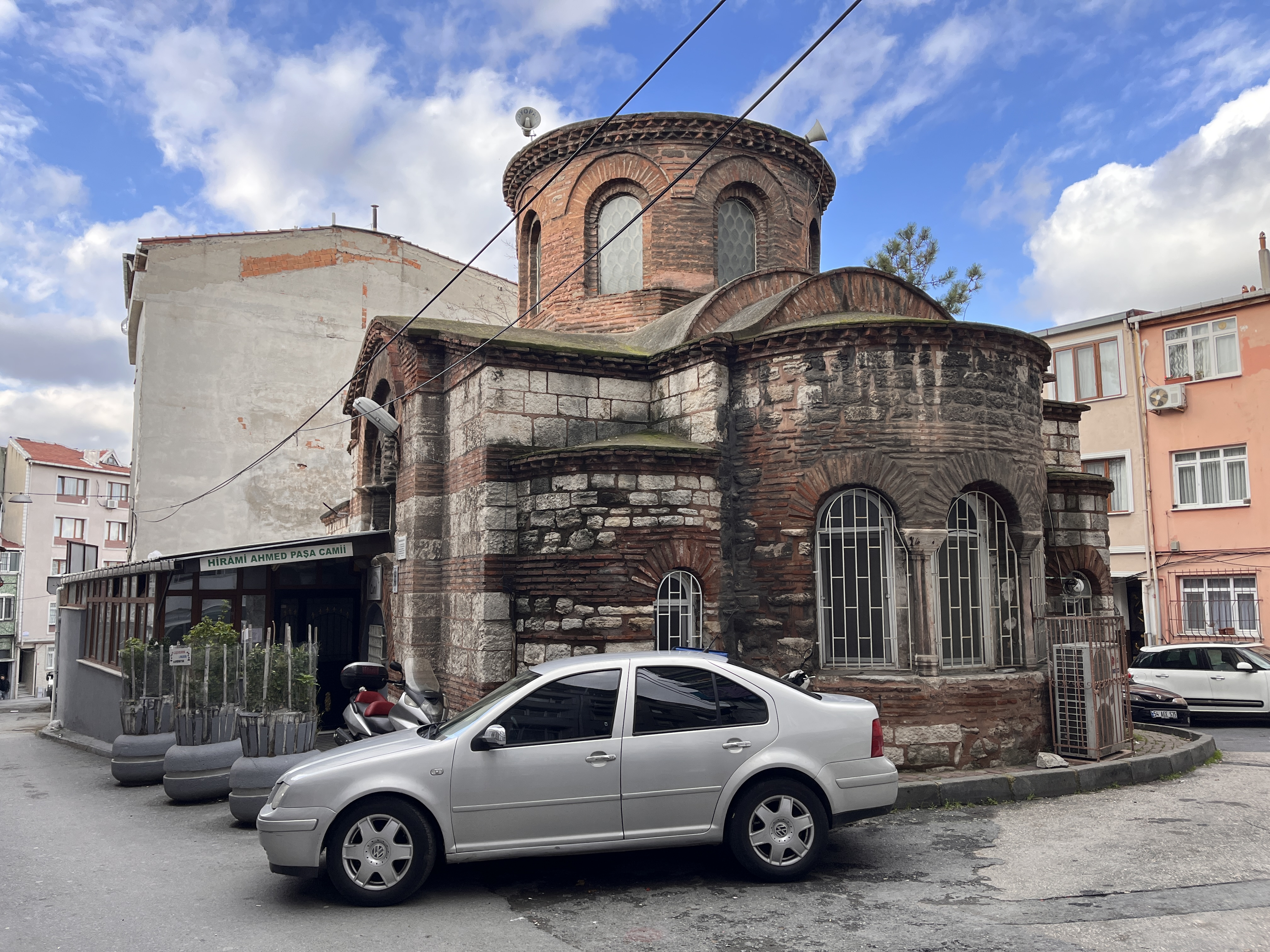
- The Mosque viewed from the east with the apse in foreground as of 2007

- Location in the Fatih district of Istanbul

Religion
- Affiliation: Sunni Islam
- Year consecrated: Between 1587 and 1598

Location
- Location: Istanbul, Turkey
- Coordinates: 41°01′40.28″N 28°56′44.84″E

Architecture
- Type: church with cross-in-square plan
- Style: Byzantine
- Completed: 12th century
- Materials: bricks, stone

Hirami Ahmet Pasha Mosque (Turkish: Hırami Ahmet Paşa Mescidi) is a former Eastern Orthodox church converted into a mosque by the Ottomans. The small church, one among the 36 dedicated to Saint John the Baptist in Constantinople, was part of a monastery bearing the same name. Its full name was Saint John the Forerunner by-the-Dome (Greek: Ἃγιος Ἰωάννης ὁ Πρόδρομος ἐν τῷ Τρούλλῳ, Hagios Ioannis ho Prodromos en tō Trullō). It is the smallest Byzantine church of Constantinople still extant and has never been studied.

== Location ==
The building lies in Istanbul, in the district of Fatih, in the neighborhood of Çarşamba, one of the most (Islamic) conservative areas of the walled city. It is located in Koltutçu Sokak, along a small square, surrounded by new buildings, less than 400 metres (1,300 feet) to the south of the complex of the Pammakaristos.

== History ==
Nothing is known about this church before the conquest of Constantinople in 1453. The appellation "troullos" (Latin trullus, Italian trullo, dome) probably comes from a dome-roofed palace that used to be in the neighborhood. The style of construction dates the building to the 12th century.

When the Patriarchate was moved from the Church of the Holy Apostles to that of Pammakaristos between 1454 and 1456, Patriarch Gennadios displaced some nuns who were living in the monastery of Pammacharistos to the small nunnery of Troullos, which was probably founded on this occasion. At the end of the 16th century, during the reign of Sultan Murat III, Hırami Ahmet Pasha, formerly Agha of the Jannissaries, converted the church of the Pammakaristos into a mosque. He did the same with the church of Saint John, closing the nunnery and expelling the nuns. This should have occurred between 1587 or 1588 (the years of the conversion of Pammakaristos) and 1598, the year of his death. The small building had gone to ruin by the beginning of the 20th century. It was carefully restored and reopened to Islamic worship in 1961.

== Architecture ==
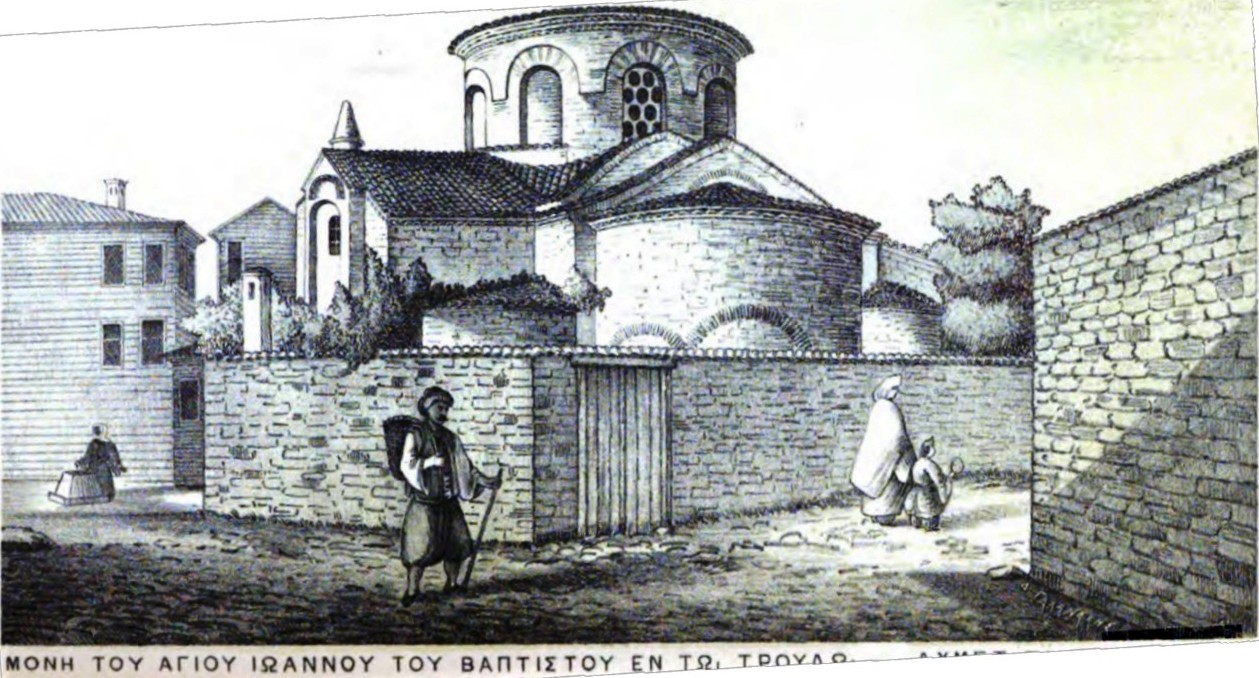
The mosque in the 1870s.

The building is built of masonry made with bricks and stone. It has a cross-in-square plan surmounted by a dome, with a bema divided in three parts and a narthex. It is only 15 metres (49 feet) long, included the narthex. The arms of the cross to the north and south are covered with barrel vaults, and the interior is lighted by triple windows. Four columns with capitals sustain an octagonal drum, which bears the dome. The three apses are semicircular. The central apse projects outside, and is opened by a large window, divided in three parts by two pillars with capitals. The diaconicon has been reused as mihrab of the mosque. The prothesis is surmounted by a barrel vault. The mosque has no minaret.

Before restoration, the building was in a very bad condition: the narthex was almost completely ruined, the columns had disappeared, and the paintings were barely visible. The four missing columns have been replaced with ancient ones, whose origin is unknown. The edifice has never been the subject of a systematic study.

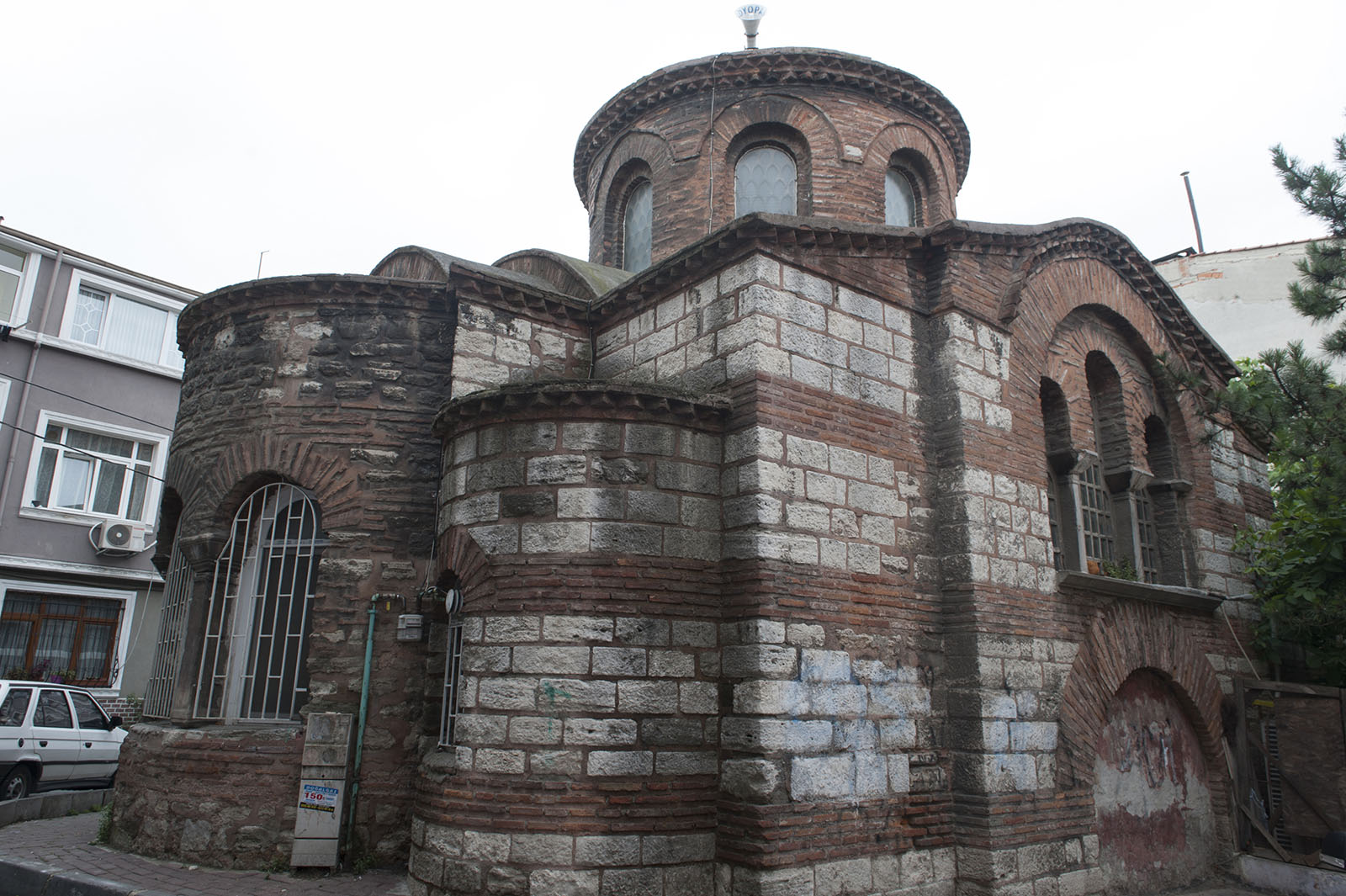
Hirami Ahmet Pasha Mosque exterior

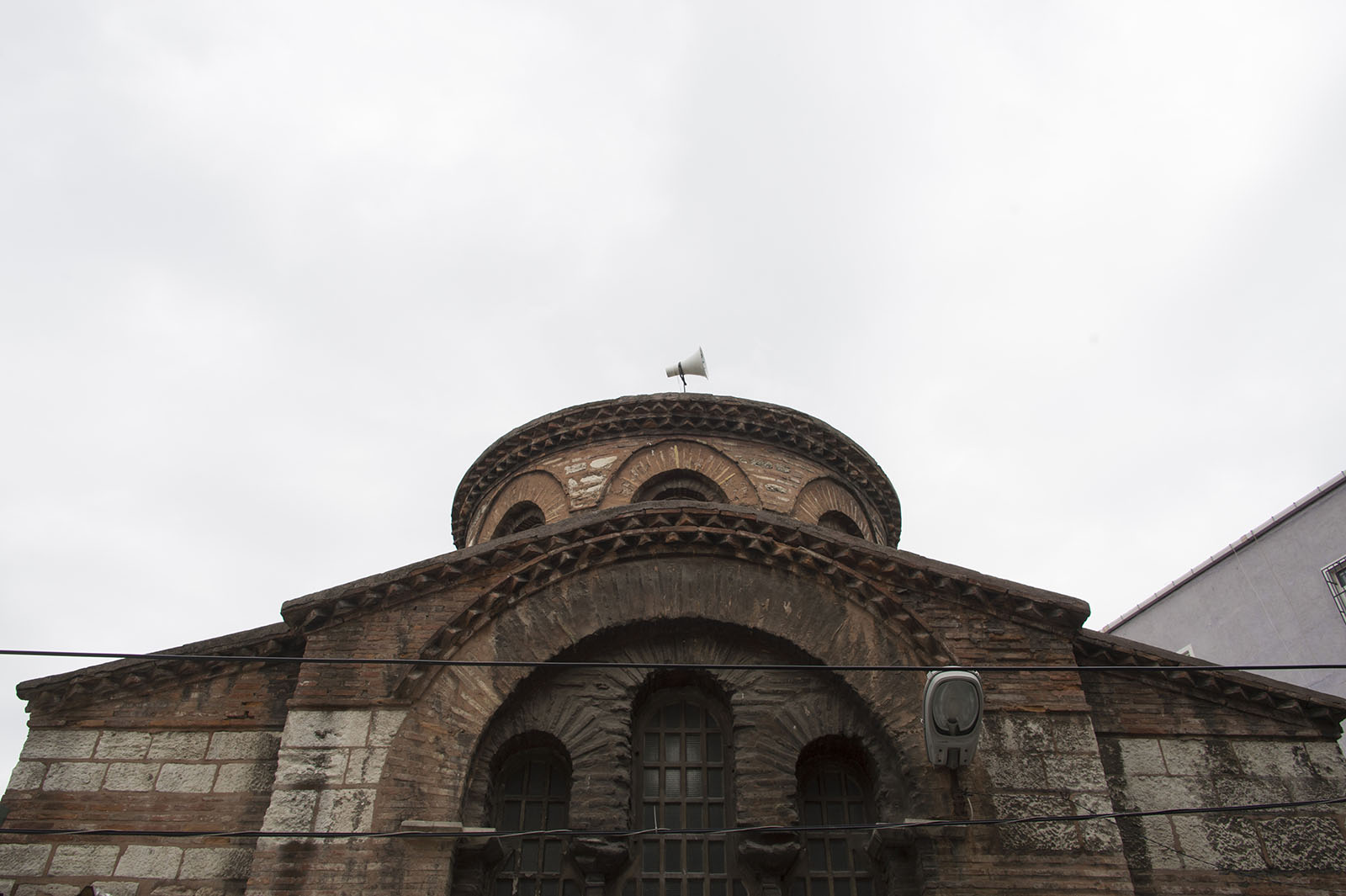
Hirami Ahmet Pasha Mosque exterior

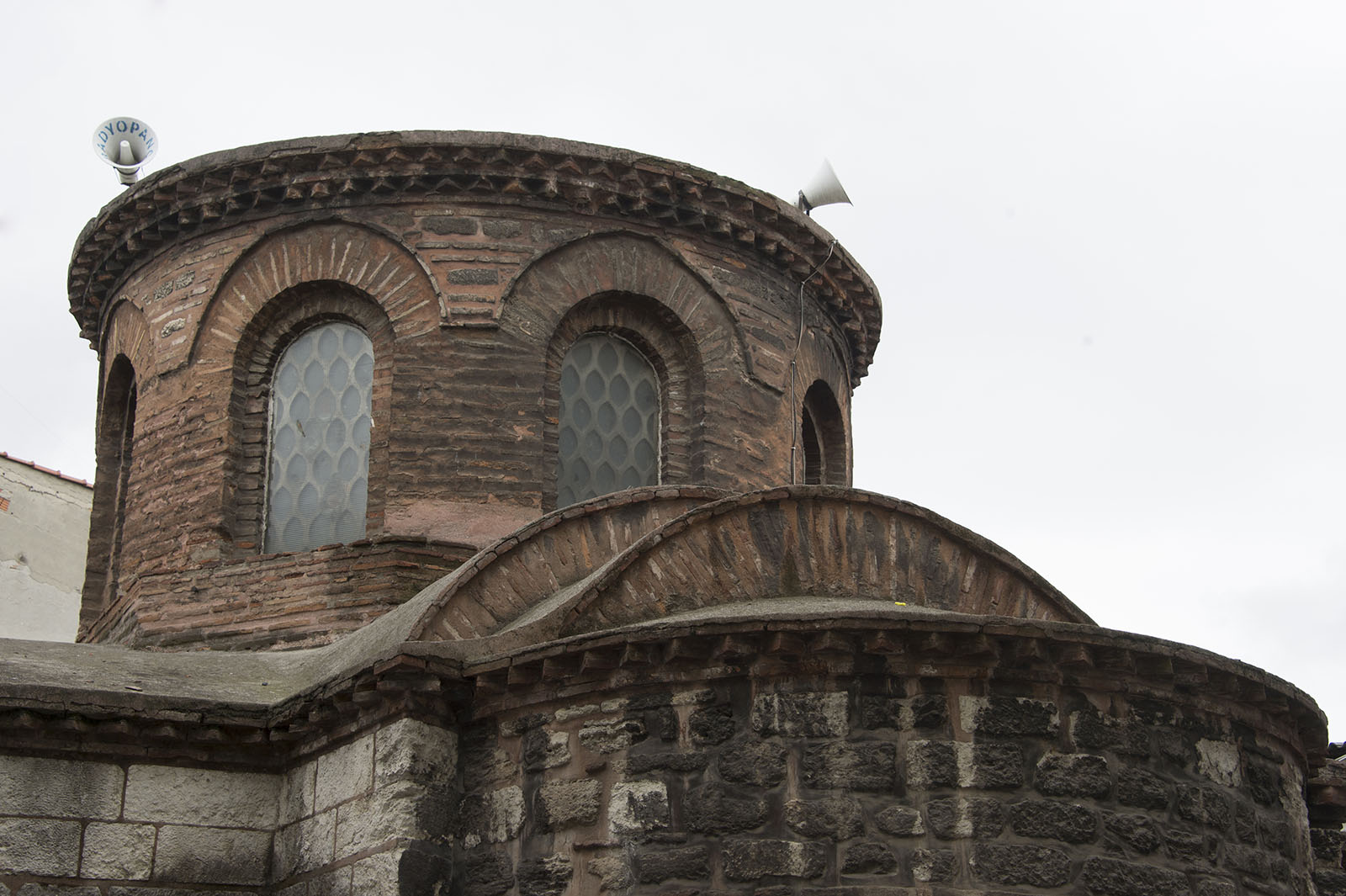
Hirami Ahmet Pasha Mosque exterior

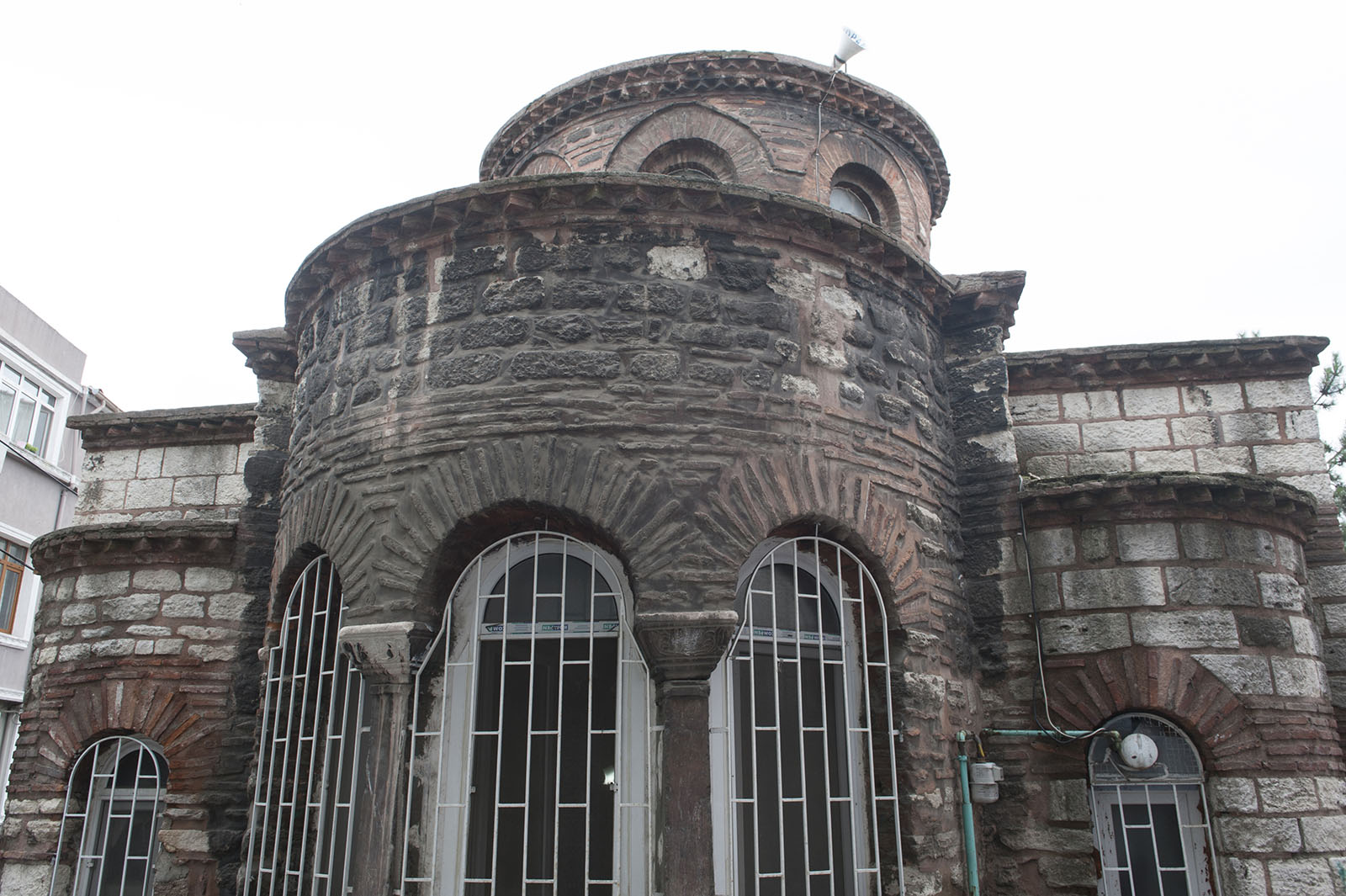
Hirami Ahmet Pasha Mosque exterior

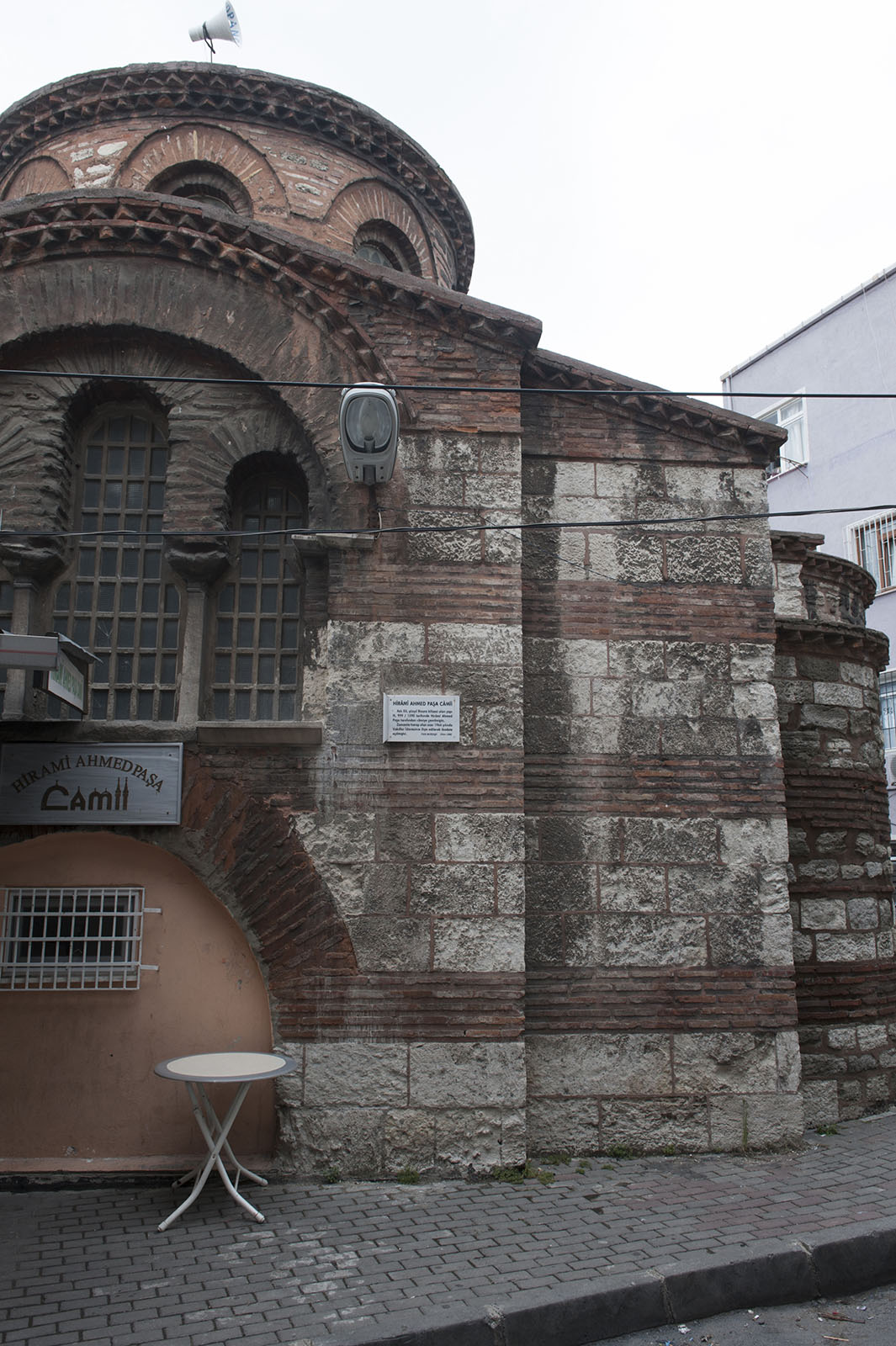
Ahmet Pasha Mosque exterior detail

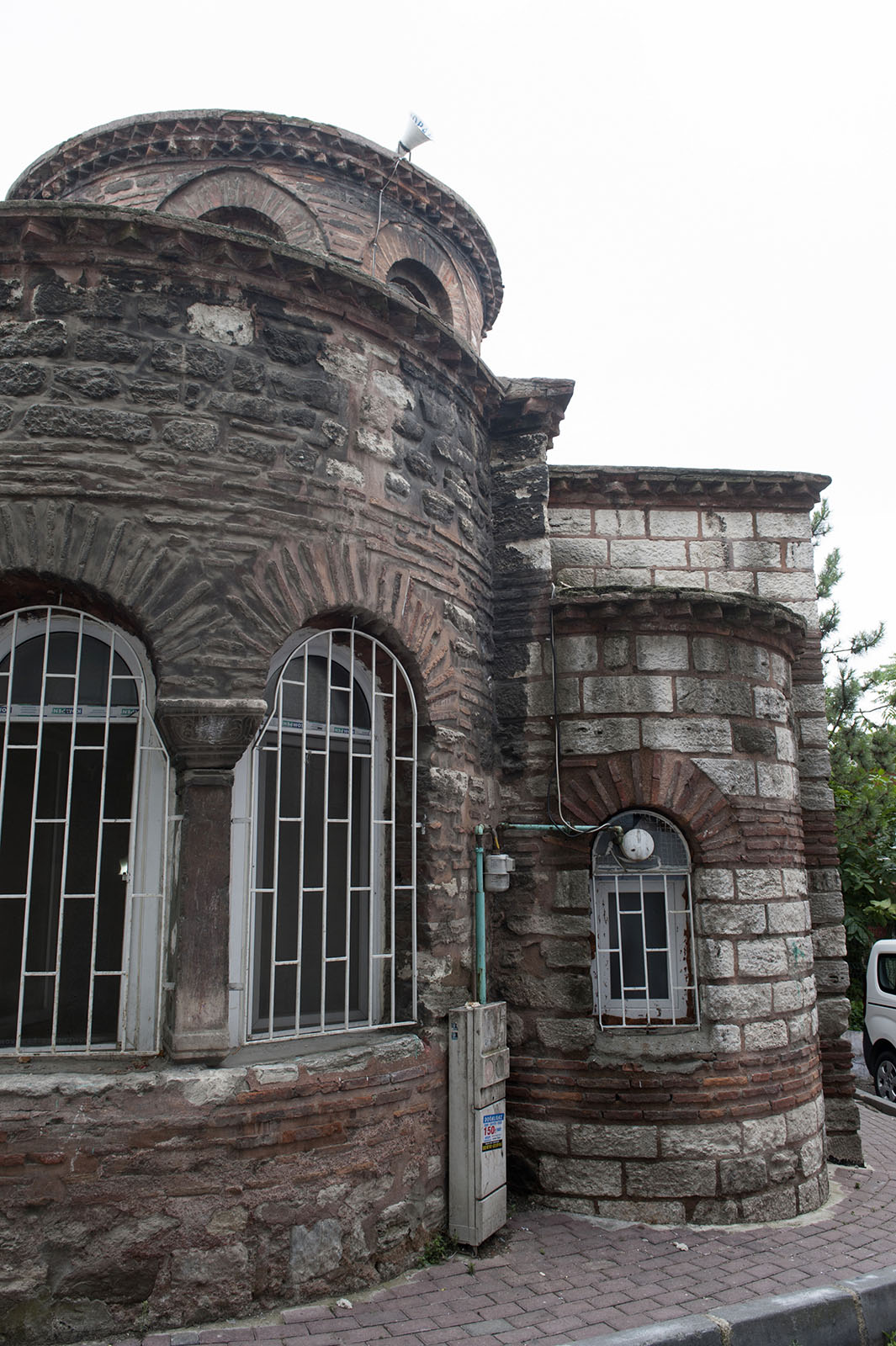
Ahmet Pasha Mosque exterior detail

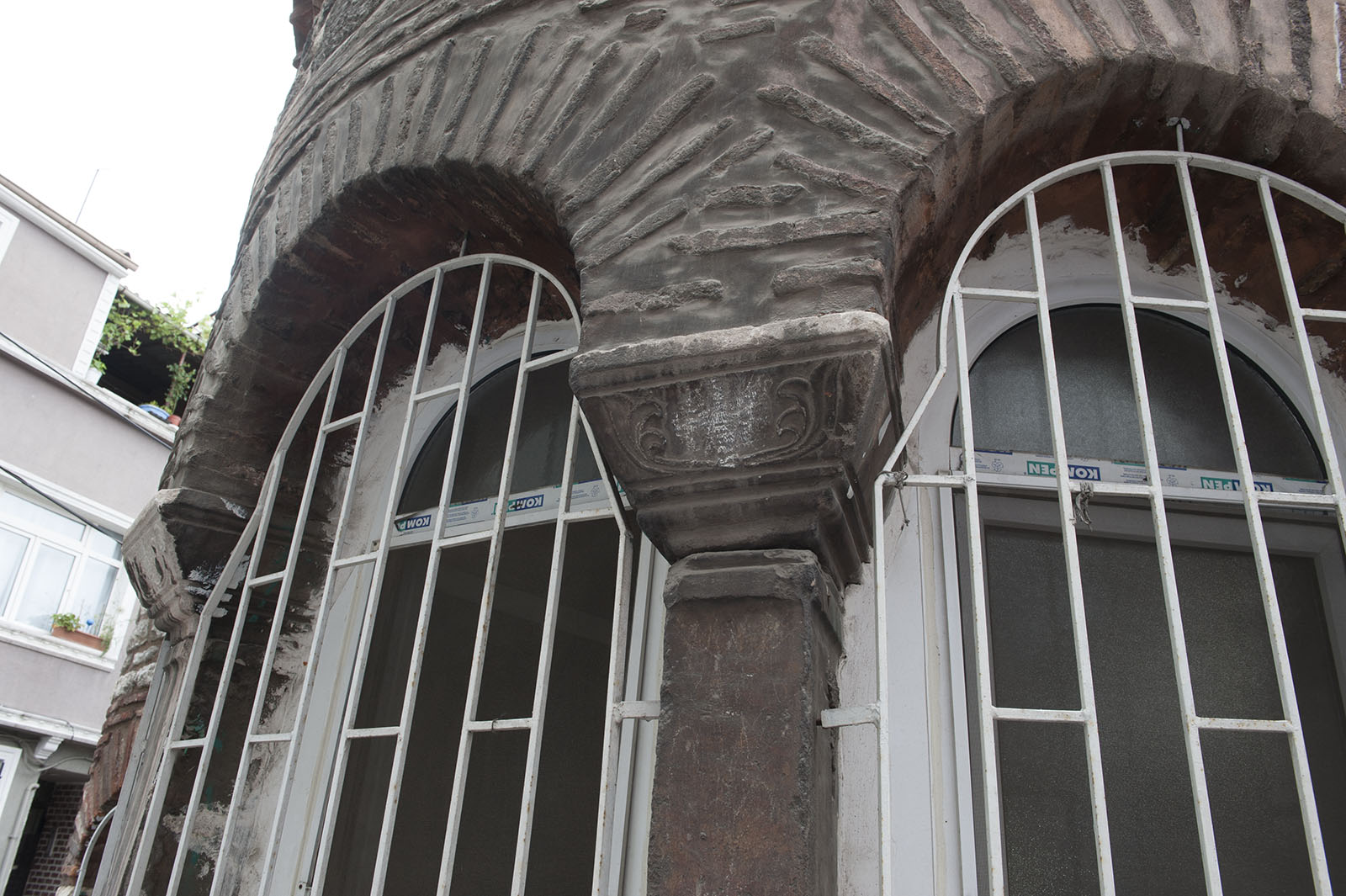
Ahmet Pasha Mosque exterior detail

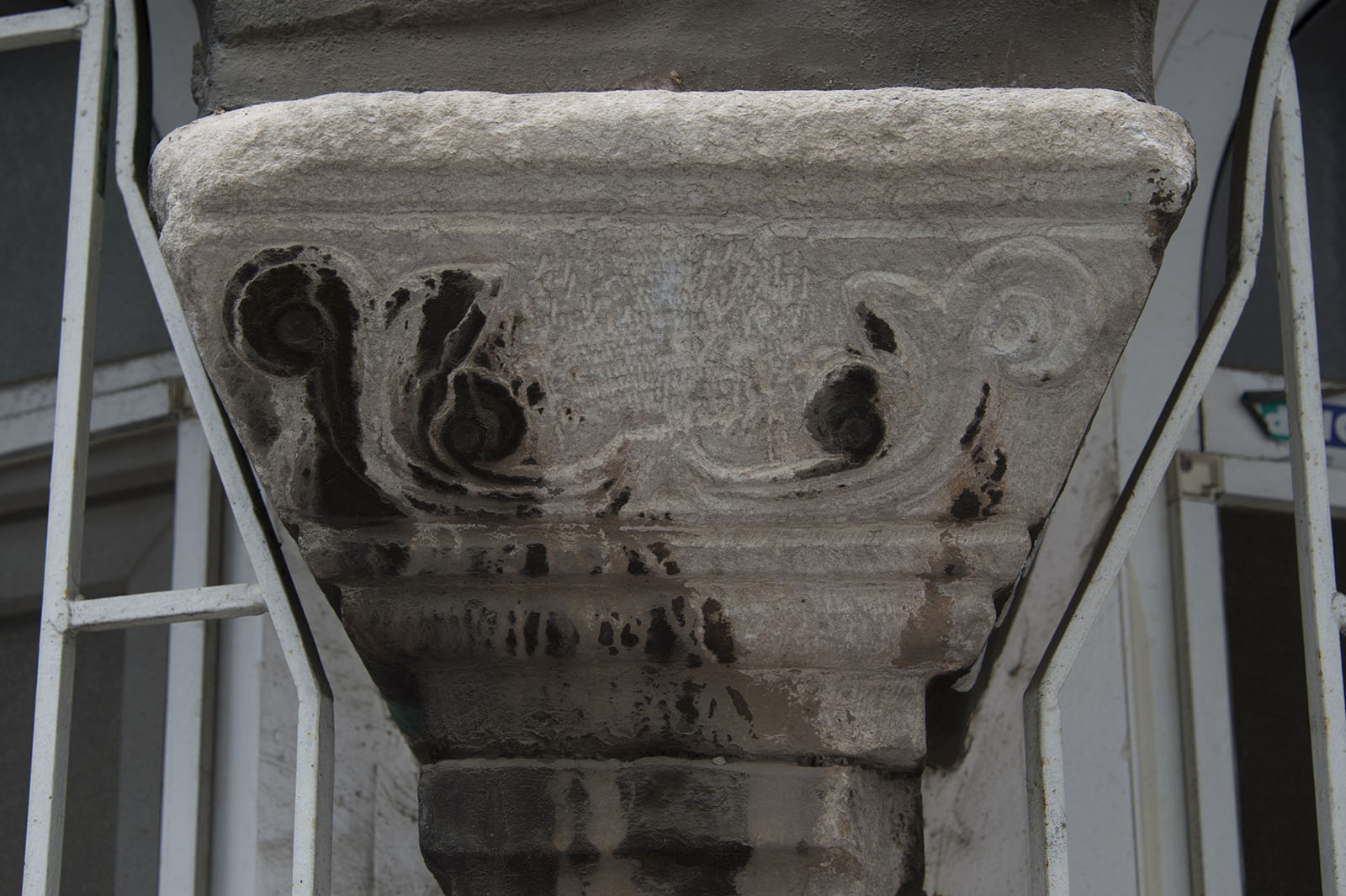
Ahmet Pasha Mosque column

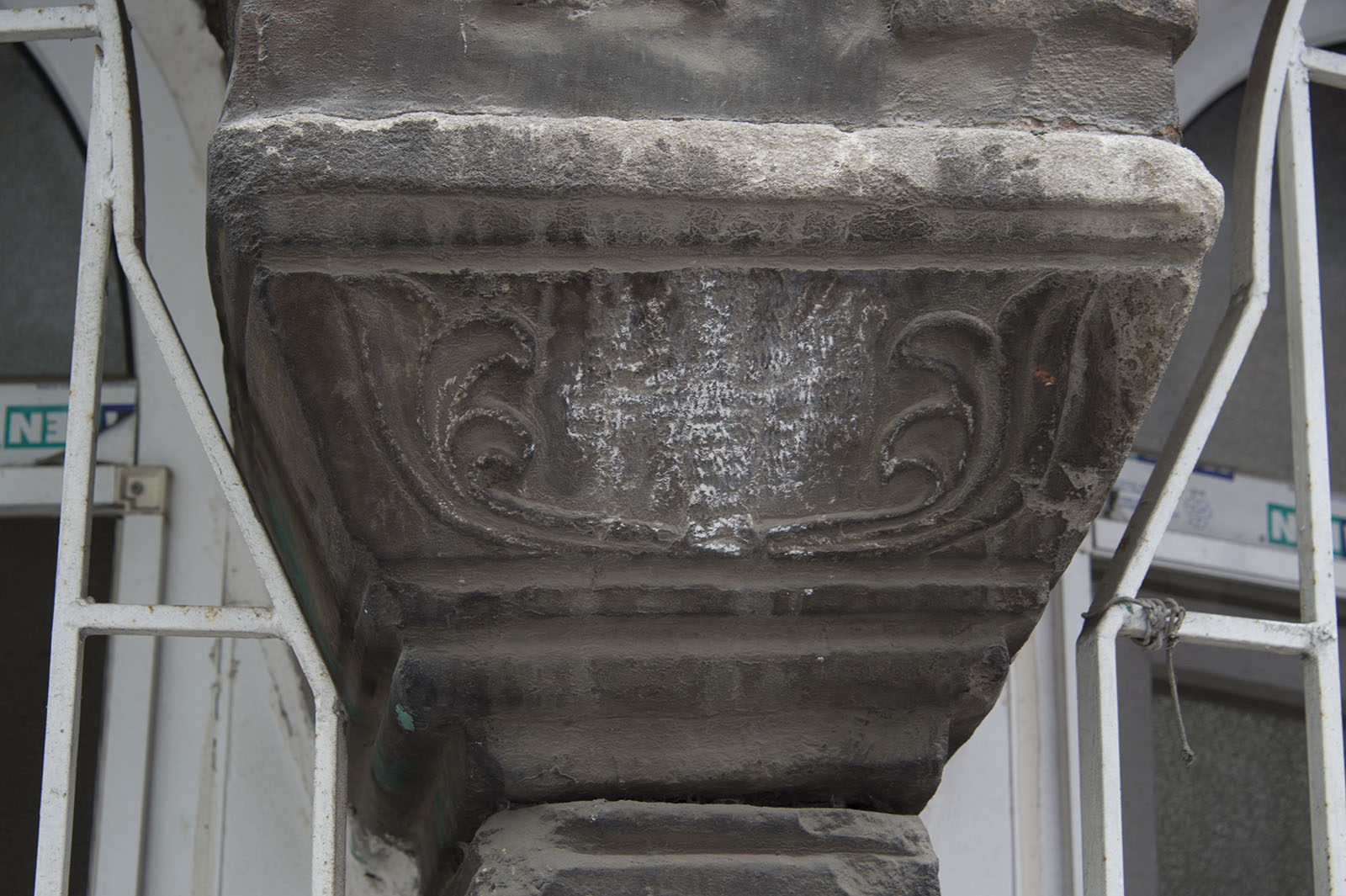
Ahmet Pasha Mosque column

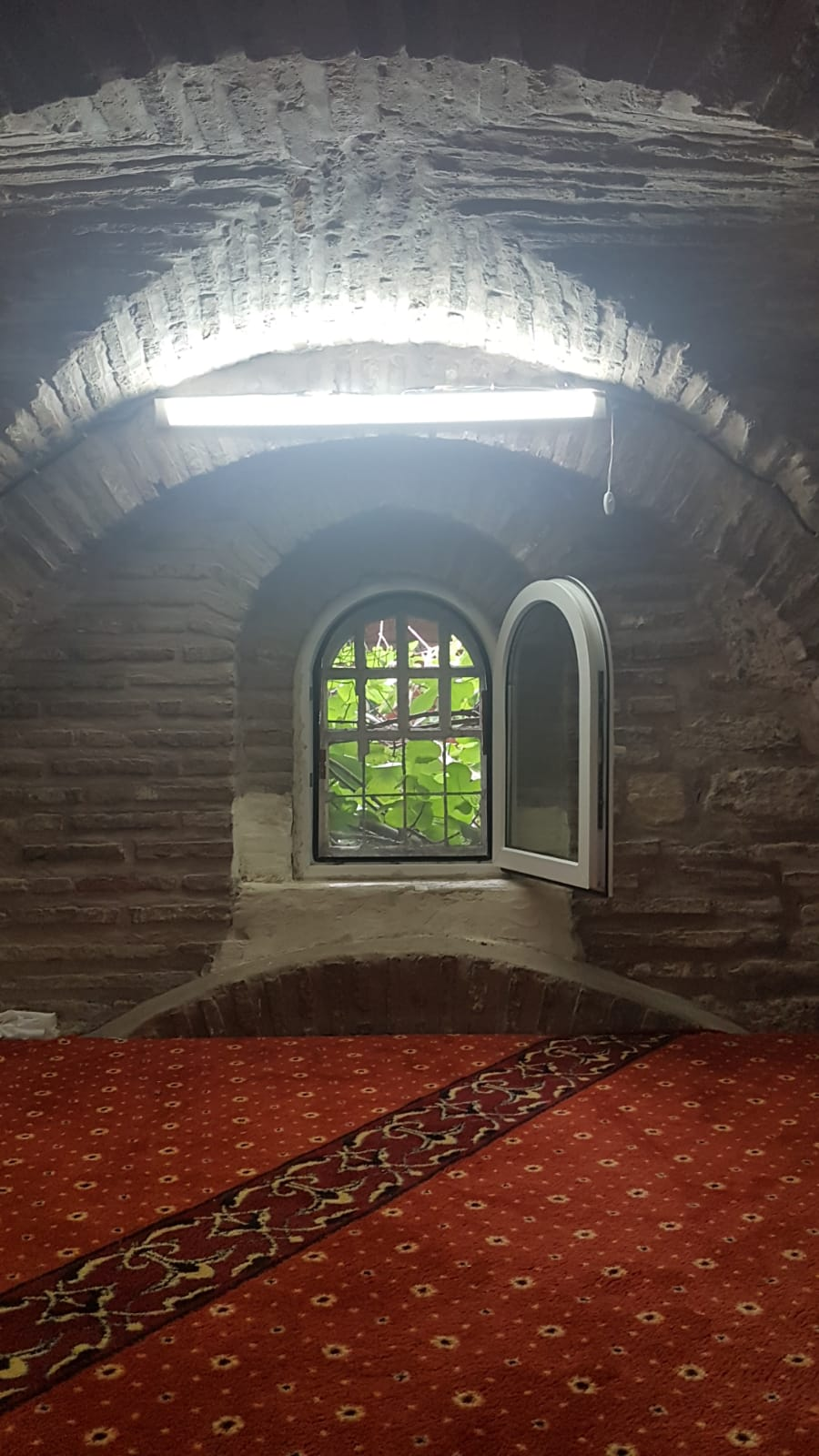
Mosque interior 1/4

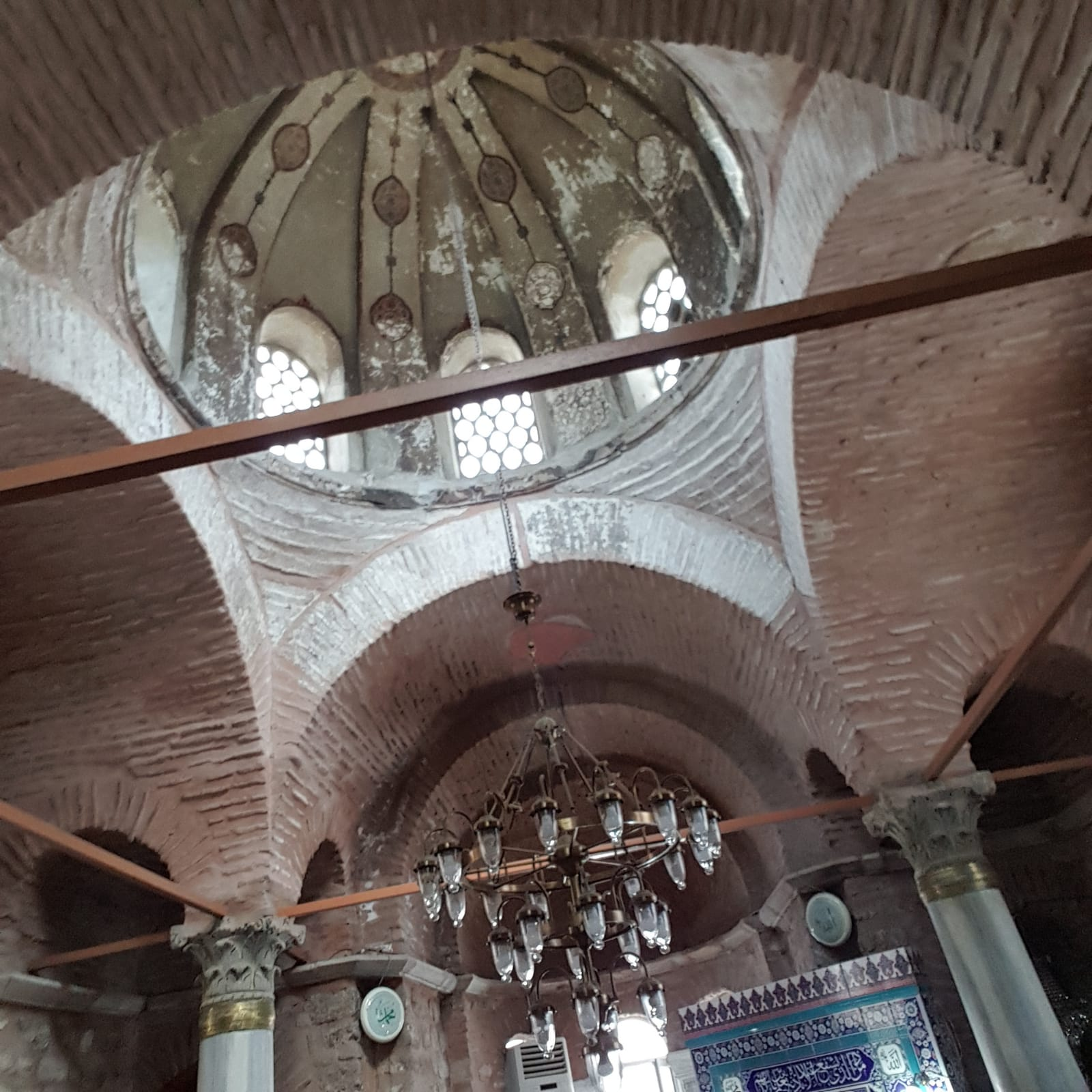
Mosque interior 2/4

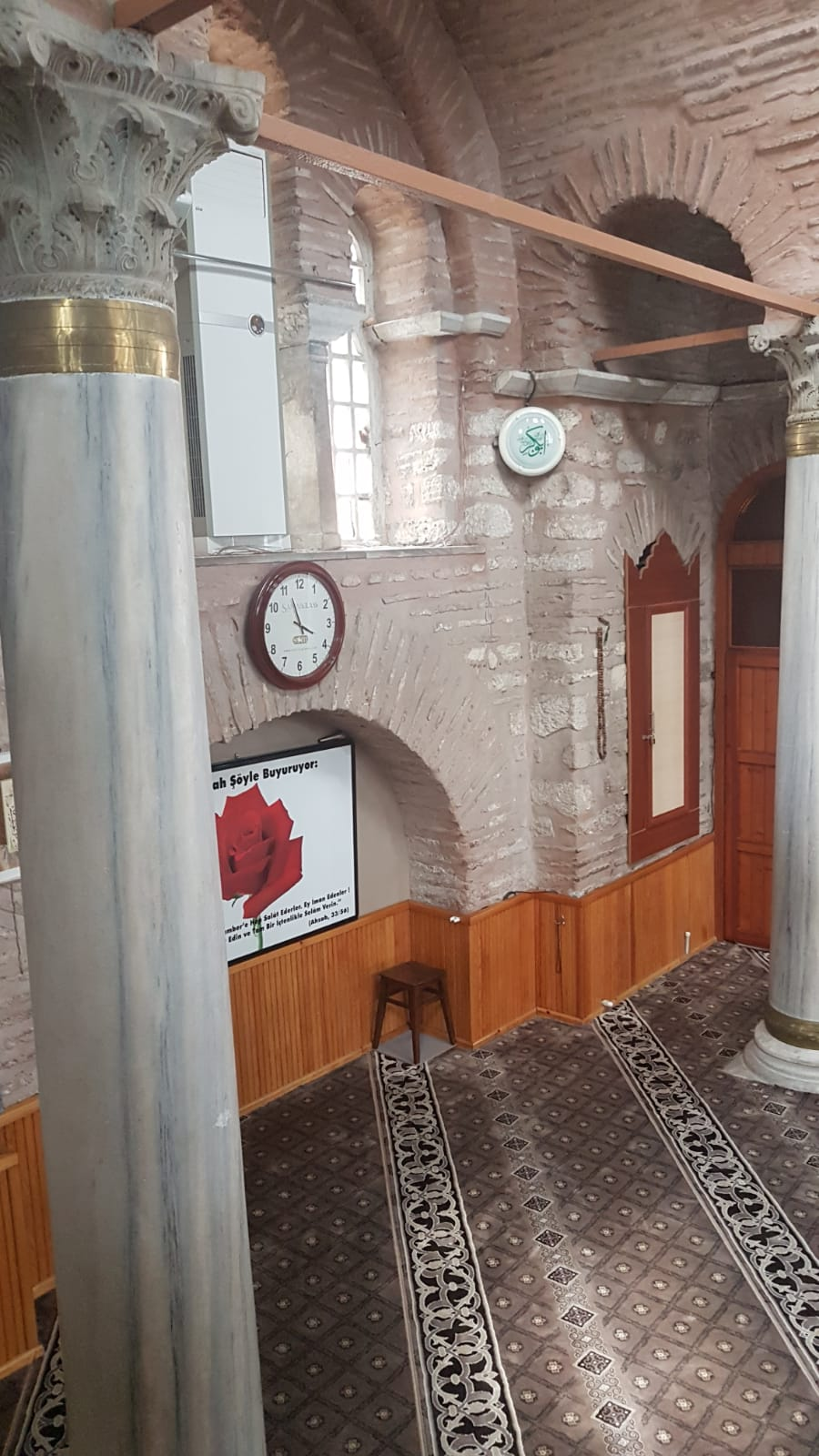
Mosque interior 3/4

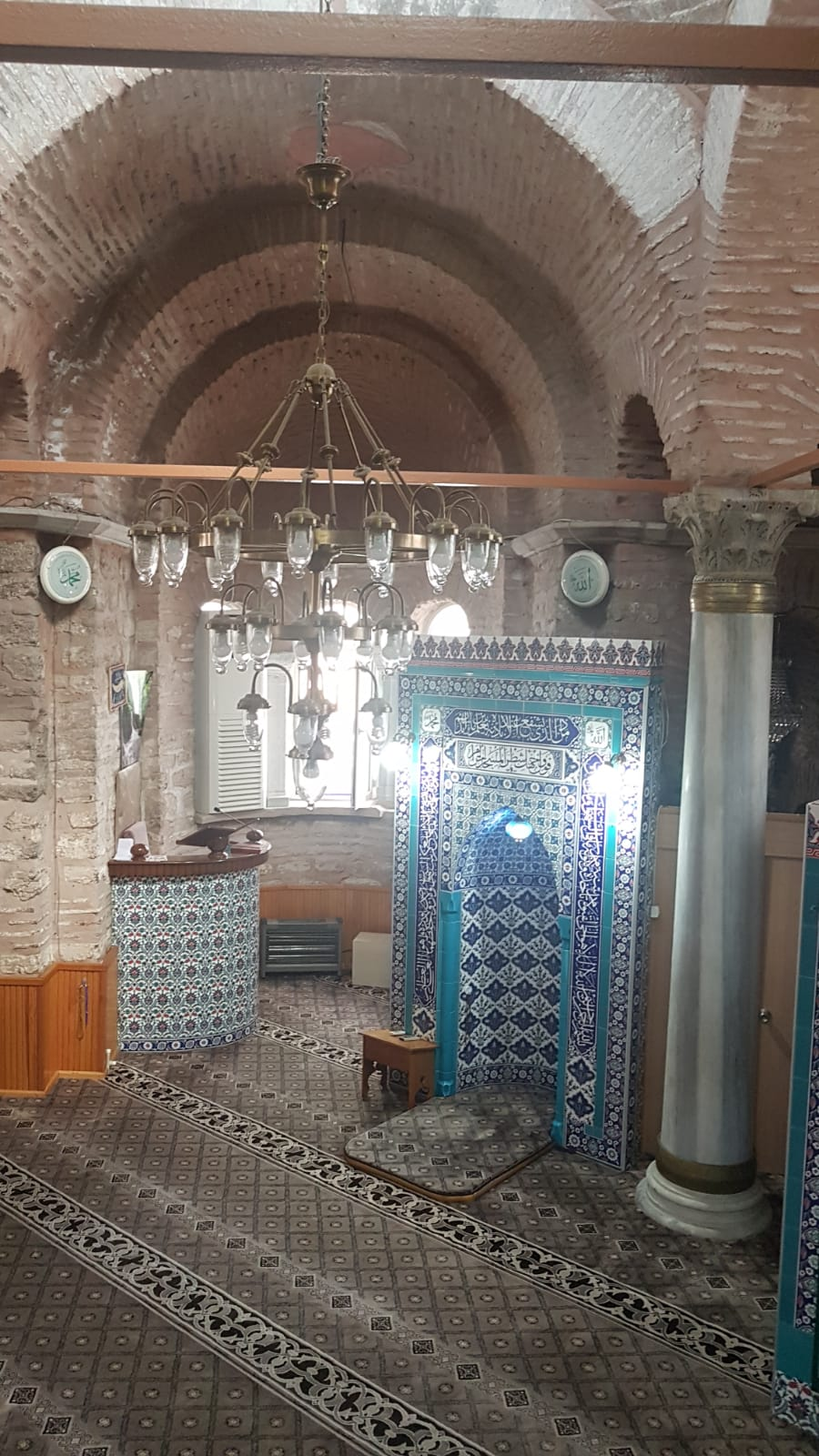
Mosque interior 4/4

== Sources ==
- Van Millingen, Alexander (1912). Byzantine Churches of Constantinople. London: MacMillan & Co.
- Mamboury, Ernest (1953). The Tourists' Istanbul. Istanbul: Çituri Biraderler Basımevi.
- Janin, Raymond (1953). La Géographie Ecclésiastique de l'Empire Byzantin. 1. Part: Le Siège de Constantinople et le Patriarcat Oecuménique. 3rd Vol. : Les Églises et les Monastères (in French). Paris: Institut Français d'Etudes Byzantines.
- Müller-Wiener, Wolfgang (1977). Bildlexikon Zur Topographie Istanbuls: Byzantion, Konstantinupolis, Istanbul Bis Zum Beginn D. 17 Jh (in German). Tübingen: Wasmuth. ISBN 978-3-8030-1022-3.
