= Ömür Kınay =

Turkish filmmaker

- Born: 1979 (age 46–47); Istanbul, Turkey
- Education: Istanbul Bilgi University
- Occupation: Film director
- Website: www.omurkinay.com

Ömür Kınay (born in 1979) is a disabled Turkish female film director, who has received the Golden Boll Award for her short film Kün.

== Early years ==
She was born in Istanbul in 1979. Ömür's mother Emine Doğançay and her father Hürol Kınay divorced when Ömür was one year old. From then on, she stayed with her mother. In the mid-1990s, she and her mother returned to Istanbul from Germany, where they had lived. At age 20, Ömür and her mother moved into their newly purchased flats situated one upon the other in the same apartment block at Sefaköy, Küçükçekmece. Just one week later, her mother died in the earthquake on August 17, 1999 under the debris of the wrecked building. Ömür was found four-and-half hours later hugging her mother. She was rescued from the wreckage, and was taken into a nearby hospital. However, she became paralyzed due to a spinal cord injury. A photograph showing her with sideward tipped head under the concrete debris appeared on the main page of major newspapers. Currently, she is reliant on a wheelchair.

In 1996, she completed her secondary education at the Bakırköy Vocational High School for Girls studying painting. Then, she attended Anadolu University for Distance Education. During this time, she jobbed in various advertising agencies and journal publishing firms.

Her impairment in 1999 caused Ömür to make a break in her higher education. Beginning in April 2001, she worked in the reception of the hospital during her therapy. From 2001 to 2003 on the weekends, she attended a graphics design course in an Arts Center. During this period, Ömür Kınay created paintings, which were shown in local group exhibitions.

In 2005, Ömür Kınay was awarded a scholarship to study Communication-Design at the Istanbul Kültür University. Following her graduation in 2009, she went to the United Kingdom sponsored by the in-London-living Turkish restaurateur Hüseyin Özer. She stayed 18 months in Brighton to learn English language. Returned home, she earned a master's degree at her alma mater.

== Career ==
In 2007, she won the "Best Experimental Film" award of the 14th Golden Boll Film Festival in Adana, Turkey with her film Kün ("To Be"), which was her university coursework. The 3-minute-20-second-long short film is about the seven advices of the poet and Sufi mystic Mevlana Celaleddin Rumi (1207–1273). Before that, she received also the "Jury Special Award" by İnönü University in Malatya and the "Short Film Award" of Yıldız Technical University in Istanbul. Her animation production Empati (Empathy) features a non-disabled person, who seeks job in the world of disabled people.

Currently, she pursues an academic career at Istanbul Bilgi University.

== Scientific publications ==
- Kınay, Ömür (2013). "Küreselleşme ve Küresel Markalaşma: Yerellik ve Kültürel Göstergeler Bağlamında 'Pringles Kebap' Örneği". The Turkish Online Journal of Design, Art and Communication. 3 (2): 12–20. doi:10.7456/10302100/002. ISSN 2146-5193.
- Kınay, Ömür (2014). "Tüketim Olgusunun Sinemada Kullanımı ve Fight Club Filminin İncelenmesi". The Turkish Online Journal of Design, Art and Communication. 4 (2): 92–104. doi:10.7456/10402100/007. ISSN 2146-5193.
- Yengin, Deniz; Ömür Kınay (2014). Ekin, Volkan (ed.). "Kitle Kültürü Örneği Olarak Çarşı". Türkiye'de Spor ve Medya. Istanbul: Köprü Yayınları: 55–71.
- Kınay, Ömür (2013). Özgül, Ruken (ed.). "İletişimde Piktogram Kullanımının Önemi ve Bedensel Engelli Piktogramına İlişkin Uygulamalar". İletişim Ve... Istanbul: Es Yayınları: 207–240.
