= Ağıt =

Agit
- Poster of Ağıt
- Directed by: Yılmaz Güney
- Written by: Yılmaz Güney
- Story by: Yılmaz Güney
- Produced by: Yılmaz Güney
- Starring: Yilmaz Güney; Bilal Inci; Atilla Olgaç; Necmettin Çobanoğlu; Meral Orhonsay; Sevda Aktolga; Yusuf Koç; Kani Kıpçak; Müfit Kiper; Refik Kemal Arduman; Hüseyin Baradan; Hüseyin Peyda; Kenan Artun; Reşit Gürzap
- Cinematography: Gani Turanli
- Edited by: Yılmaz Güney
- Music by: Arif Erkin
- Production company: Güney Film
- Release date: 1972
- Running time: 82 minutes
- Country: Turkey
- Languages: Turkish, Kurdish

Agit translated as Lament,) is a 1972 Turkish film directed by Yılmaz Güney. The screenplay was written by Güney and produced for his production company, Güney Film.

== Plot ==
Coban and his four comrades are smugglers who live in inaccessible mountains. They are hard pitiless men like the county they live in whose daily commerce is in greed, danger, betrayal, and murder.

== Production ==
Agit is Guney's final Western film. After a prolonged absence from the genre, having directed numerous urban gangster films, Guney returned to the western in the early 1970s. This film combines the Western genre with a mystical folk tale, imbued with a leftist political perspective. Shot on location in the rugged mountain terrain of Eastern Anatolia, the film explores social and political themes.

== Awards ==
In Adana Film Festival, Agit won many awards, including Best Picture, Best Director, Best Screenwriter and Best Actor for Yılmaz Güney. Also Best Cinematographer for Gani Turanli.
