= Orhan Aksoy =

Orhan Aksoy may refer to:

- Orhan Aksoy (director) (1930–2008), a Turkish director
- Orhan Aksoy (serial killer) (born 1971), a Turkish serial killer
