= Orhan Aksoy (serial killer) =

Convicted Turkish serial killer

- Born: 16 September 1971 (age 55); Samsun, Turkey
- Other name: "The Parcel Killer"
- Convictions: Murder x5 Theft x10 Fraud x1
- Penalty: Life imprisonment x5

Details
- Victims: 5
- Span of crimes: 2000–2001
- Country: Turkey
- State: Marmara
- Date apprehended: 26 January 2001

Orhan Aksoy (born 16 September 1971), known as The Parcel Killer (Turkish: Kolici Katil), is a Turkish serial killer who strangled five people around Istanbul from 2000 to 2001, stuffing their corpses in boxes he dumped in open fields or near construction sites. For his crimes, he was given five life terms and two years of solitary confinement.

== Early life ==
Orhan Aksoy was born as one of nine children on 16 September 1971, in Samsun, a port town to which his family had moved to from Sürmene. While he was still young, the entire family moved to Bursa. Both Aksoy and his siblings suffered terrible beatings from their father, Ahmet, who beat them for the smallest of mishaps. In a later interview with two of his older sisters, Perihan and Ruveyde, the pair claimed that when Aksoy was young and their home was undergoing construction work, he was running around when he fell and hit his head. Since that incident, he would occasionally wake up in the middle night, screaming and shouting that some invisible forces were going to get him.

At the age of 20, Aksoy ran away from home and moved to Istanbul, where he lived off stealing before he was caught and sentenced to five years imprisonment for 10 thefts and one count of fraud. After serving out his sentence, Aksoy, who was suffering from tuberculosis, moved to Bucharest, Romania for treatment. While residing there, he met and married a kindergarten teacher, who later moved with him back to Turkey, taking on the name "Mine". During this period, Aksoy started working as a busboy at a restaurant and had two children, Esen and Esin. Eventually, he gave up his job and started work as a peddler.

Not long after, the entire country was struck by a series of earthquakes, prompting Aksoy's wife to ask him to return to Romania. Orhan consented, allowing his wife and children to move to Bucharest, while he stayed behind in Istanbul, renting out a bachelor's room in the Çarşamba district.

== Murders ==
Aksoy's modus operandi consisted of killing people either for small offences, extortion or stealing their belongings. To do so, he plied them with alcohol and then strangled them with a nylon rope to prevent any blood from being spilt, as the sight of it frightened him. In an effort to erase any and all traces of foul play, he kept the corpses underwater for an extended period of time, and would also cover them with either newspapers or silicone to mask the body odors emanating from the decomposing bodies. He would later admit to "chatting" with the corpses while drowning them.

From the span of October 2000 to January 2001, he killed five people. They were the following:

- Mehmedi Yeşilyayla: a fellow busboy and flatmate of Aksoy. Suspecting that he had stolen his phone, Aksoy strangled Yeşilyayla at the apartment in Fatih while he was sleeping on 9 October 2000. He then stuffed his body in a box and dumped it in Yenibosna.
- Hakan Kaya: a friend of Aksoy. Suspecting that he had stolen some items from his apartment, in addition to sharing different political views, Aksoy invited Kaya over for a drink on 23 November. When Kaya got drunk enough, Aksoy proceeded to strangle him with a nylon rope, before stuffing it in a box and leaving at an open field in Kemerburgaz.
- Turgut Erkan: actor and acquaintance of Aksoy. Fearing that he was suspicious over the disappearance of his friend Hakan, Aksoy invited him over for a drink on 30 November. Once Erkan was drunk enough, Aksoy strangled him as well, before he put his body in a box and dumping it in Gaziosmanpaşa.
- Ömer Şeker: a fellow peddler, Şeker was targeted by Aksoy for insulting a Romanian woman, which personally offended him as his wife was one. He was lured to Aksoy's home, plied with alcohol and ultimately strangled with the nylon rope on 16 January 2001; however, unlike the previous victims, his body was dumped in a municipal garbage bin at a construction site in Fatih.
- Ali Rıza İdrisoğlu: an acquaintance of Aksoy who was behind on an 80 million lira debt, İdrisoğlu was invited to the apartment on 17 January, where he was promptly made to drink alcohol and strangled. His body was then stuffed in a box and abandoned at a park in Gaziosmanpaşa.

== Arrest, trial and imprisonment ==
On 16 January 2001, the first box was discovered by police, and over the next few days, the remaining were also located. Due to the nature of the crimes (the victims being found naked and taped all over), it was initially suggested that they were victims of Hezbollah militants. However, when Yeşilyayla was positively identified, police, who noticed that his phone was missing, kept tabs on the phone's tracking data, eventually getting a signal from Bursa. As a result, Orhan Aksoy was swiftly arrested there on 26 January 2001.

In subsequent interrogations with police, Aksoy admitted the killings and made several bizarre claims, stating that he became a vegetarian after the first murder. Nonetheless, his most damning admission was his apparent liking for murder, lack of remorse and likeliness to reoffend if released. Despite this, his family members refused to believe that he was guilty, stating that he was incapable of doing such vile acts.

At his trial, Aksoy recanted his confessions, claiming that he was physically incapable of lifting the heavy boxes with the bodies inside them and that he confessed because he was "inspired" from watching many Turkish crime dramas and foreign films such as Once Upon a Time in America and Police Academy. Questions regarding his sanity were raised following his peculiar conduct in court, which included an incident in which he threw his watch at the judge. Eventually, the prosecution, who initially sought the death penalty, resorted to seeking life imprisonment for each murder charge. In June 2004, Aksoy was convicted and given five life terms, as well as two years in solitary confinement.

== Father's murder ==
On 26 October 2001, Aksoy's father Ahmet, who by then had divorced his wife and moved to a residence in Bursa, was dead. A plastic bag had been placed over his head, and he had tied with duct tape in a remarkably similar fashion to his son's victims. Upon closely inspecting the fingerprints, the gendarmerie linked them to the man's tenant, Hüsamettin Karaca, a convicted extortionist. It is thought that the killing was done as an act of revenge for Aksoy's own murders.

== See also ==
- List of serial killers by country

== Bibliography ==
- Sevinç Yavuz (May 2017). Kolici Bir Seri Katilin Hikayesi [Parcel: The Story of a Serial Killer] (in Turkish). ISBN 9789759969233.

== Documentary ==
- Aksoy's case was one of several covered in the 2021 documentary Türkiye'deki Seri Katiller (Serial Killers in Turkey), released on Exxen
