= Duvar (film) =

Yılmaz Güney's last film, made in 1983

- Film poster
- Directed by: Yılmaz Güney
- Written by: Yılmaz Güney
- Produced by: Marin Karmitz
- Starring: Tuncel Kurtiz
- Cinematography: Izzet Akay
- Edited by: Sabine Mamou
- Release date: 18 May 1983
- Running time: 117 minutes
- Countries: Turkey; France
- Languages: Turkish; French

Duvar is a 1983 Turkish drama film directed by Yılmaz Güney produced in France. It was entered into the 1983 Cannes Film Festival.

== Cast ==
- Tuncel Kurtiz as Tonton Ali
- Ayse Emel Mesci Kuray as the 'politique' (as Ayse Emel Mesci)
- Malik Berrichi as An Arab
- Nicolas Hossein as Uzun, 'L'échalas'
- Isabelle Tissandier as Hatice, the bride
- Ahmet Ziyrek as Cafer
- Ali Berktay as Samil, groom
- Selahattin Kuzmoglu as prison director
- Jean-Pierre Colin as general director of the prisons
- Jacques Dimanche as Sevket, gardien-chef
- Ali Dede Altuntas as Pépé Ali
- Necdet Nakiboglu as Necdet
- Sema Kuray as little girl
- Zeynep Kuray as little girl
- Habes Bounabi as Tom
- Bernard Certeau as the lawyer
- Jérémie Nassif as Bonzo
- Christina Castillo as a pregnant woman
