= Yol (film) =

1982 film by Yılmaz Güney and Şerif Gören

- Poster
- Directed by: Yılmaz Güney; Şerif Gören
- Written by: Yılmaz Güney
- Story by: Yılmaz Güney
- Produced by: Yılmaz Güney; Edi Hubschmid; Kerim L. Puldi; L. Erol Gözmen; M. Sabri Aslankara; Thierry Maitrejean
- Starring: Tarık Akan; Halil Ergün; Şerif Sezer; Necmettin Çobanoğlu; Meral Orhonsay; Sevda Aktolga; Hikmet Çelik; Tuncay Akça
- Cinematography: Erdoğan Engin
- Edited by: Yılmaz Güney
- Music by: Zülfü Livaneli
- Production companies: Güney Film; Cactus Film; Maran Film; Record Film
- Release dates: May 1982 (Cannes); February 12, 1999 (Turkey)
- Running time: 124 minutes
- Countries: Turkey; Switzerland; France
- Languages: Turkish, Kurdish

Yol (pronounced [joɫ]; translated as The Way, The Road or The Path) is a 1982 Turkish film directed by Yılmaz Güney and Şerif Gören. The screenplay was written by Güney—who at the time was in prison—with detailed directing instructions, which were carried out by his assistant Gören. Later, after Güney escaped from Imrali prison, he took the negatives of the film to Switzerland and later edited it in Paris.

The film is a portrait of Turkey in the aftermath of the 1980 Turkish coup d'état: its people and its authorities are shown via the stories of five prisoners given a week's home leave. The film has caused much controversy in Turkey, and was banned until 1999. However, it won numerous honours, including the Palme d'Or at the 1982 Cannes Film Festival. It also was selected as the Swiss entry for the Best Foreign Language Film at the 55th Academy Awards, but was not accepted as a nominee.

== Plot ==
In Turkey, several prisoners are granted temporary leave from prison. One of them, Seyit Ali (Tarık Akan), travels to his house and discovers that, in order to survive, his wife Zine (Şerif Sezer) had to turn to prostitution. Caught by her family, she was held captive for eight months so that Seyit Ali would end her life in an honour killing. Although seemingly determined to do that initially, he changes his mind when he realizes that his wife is freezing while travelling in the snow. Despite his efforts to keep her alive, he ultimately fails, and his wife's death relieves Seyit Ali from family pressure.

Another prisoner, Mehmet Salih (Halil Ergün), has been arrested for his role in a heist with his brother-in-law, whom he abandoned as police shot at him. His in-laws disown him, and he is finally forced to tell his wife Emine (Meral Orhonsay) the truth. Emine and Mehmet Salih decide to run away on a train. On the train, they are caught in the washroom about to have sex. They are saved from an angry mob by the train's officers and held in a cabin. A young boy from Emine's family, who had earlier threatened to kill them, boards the train and shoots both Mehmet Salih and Emine.

Ömer (Necmettin Çobanoğlu) returns to his village, situated near the border between Turkey and Syria, and arranges to cross the border to escape prison. Ömer finds his village in a battle between Kurdish smugglers and Turkish soldiers. Though Ömer is clearly determined to leave, he gives up the idea after his brother, who took part in the battle, is shot dead. Through his brother's death, Ömer inherits the responsibility for his late brother's family and becomes the husband to his late brother's wife, as dictated by tradition, despite his attraction to a young woman in the village.

== Production ==
Güney wrote the screenplay, in part inspired by his own captivity, which contained elaborate detail, including detailed instructions for directing as well as camera angles, but could not personally carry this program out as he was a captive in a Turkish prison. Güney initially recruited Erden Kiral as his surrogate director but, displeased with Kiral's work, had it destroyed and fired him. This became the basis of Kiral's later film, Yolda.

Güney subsequently hired Serif Gören. There were rumours that several prisoners, including Güney, watched much of Gören's footage on a wall at the prison. Güney later broke out of prison to edit Yol in Switzerland.

Zülfü Livaneli made the music for the movie, but due to political atmosphere then in Turkey, he used a pseudonym Sebastian Argol in order to avoid possible sanctions from Turkish courts which were then operating under 1980 Turkish coup d'état rules.

== Controversies ==
=== Political controversy ===
The film was banned in Turkey because of its negative portrayal of Turkey at the time, which was under the control of a military dictatorship. Even more controversial was the limited use of the Kurdish language, music and culture (which were forbidden in Turkey at the time), as well as the portrayal of the hardships Kurds live through in Turkey. One scene in the movie even calls the location of Ömer's village "Kürdistan".

A new version of Yol was released in 2017, called Yol: The Full Version in which many of these controversial parts and scenes have been taken out, to make the film suitable for release in Turkey. In order to be shown at the Turkish stand at Cannes 2017 the Kürdistan insert was removed. In what critics say goes against the director Yılmaz Güney's wishes and call "censorship", the frame showing "Kürdistan" as well as a highly political scene where Ömer speaks about difficulties of being Kurdish were removed.

Another new version exists for the international market with all the politically controversial scenes included.

=== Rights dispute ===
The rights to Yol were disputed for a long time. Even during Yilmaz Güney's lifetime, there were major conflicts about the ownership of the film between Güney and Donat Keusch, the head of a Swiss-based service company called Cactus Film AG, who claimed to own the entire rights of the film. After Güney's death, the dispute escalated between Keusch and Güney's widow.

When Keusch filed for bankruptcy with his Cactus Film AG in 1999, the situation became even more complicated and resulted in numerous lawsuits in both Switzerland and France. There still are numerous sellers in the market claiming to be the sole owner of the world rights to Yol, and the film is offered in different versions through different distribution channels.

According to the bankruptcy office Zurich Aussersihl, Keusch received the rights which still remained in Cactus Film on March 4, 2010. This happened without payment. Keusch also sent this contract to the RCA-directory of the French CNC (film number 2010.2922) trying to use it as a proof that he had rights. In any case Keusch could only get from the bankruptcy office rights that cactus film had since no bankruptcy office can create non-existing rights.

== Reception ==
Vincent Canby, writing for The New York Times, wrote that, although the film addressed significant issues, touching on these issues did not make it great art. Canby described it as "a large, decent, ponderous panorama". Time critic Richard Corliss declared Güney "a world-class moviemaker".

In 1982, director Werner Herzog said that Yol is "one of the films that has touched me so deeply — like barely anything else in the last ten years. It's just a masterpiece". In his 2015 Movie Guide, Leonard Maltin gave it three stars, describing it as "Incisive". In 2016, The Hollywood Reporter ranked it the 65th best film to win the Palme d'Or, saying the production was a better story than that on screen.

Mexican director Alejandro González Iñárritu, who watched the film at a young age, later said in an interview that this film was the reason he turned to cinema. Yol was one of 15 films Iñárritu exhibited at a film exhibition in Milan in 2016.

On the review aggregator website Rotten Tomatoes, 77% of 13 critics' reviews are positive, with an average rating of 7.3/10.

=== Accolades ===
The film won three honours at the 1982 Cannes Film Festival, tying for the top prize, the Palme d'Or, with Missing by Costa-Gavras. The film was selected as the Swiss entry for the Best Foreign Language Film at the 55th Academy Awards, but was not accepted as a nominee.

Award	Date of ceremony	Category	Recipient(s)	Result	Ref(s)
Cannes Film Festival	14 – 26 May 1982	Palme d'Or	Yılmaz Güney and Şerif Gören	Won	
Cannes Film Festival	14 – 26 May 1982	FIPRESCI Prize	Yılmaz Güney and Şerif Gören	Won	
Cannes Film Festival	14 – 26 May 1982	Ecumenical Jury Special Mention	Yılmaz Güney and Şerif Gören	Won	
César Awards	26 February 1983	Best Foreign Film	Yılmaz Güney and Şerif Gören	Nominated	
French Syndicate of Cinema Critics	1983	Best Foreign Film	Yılmaz Güney and Şerif Gören	Won	
Golden Globe Awards	29 January 1983	Best Foreign Language Film	Yılmaz Güney and Şerif Gören	Nominated	
London Film Critics' Circle	November 1983	Best Foreign Language Film	Yılmaz Güney and Şerif Gören	Won	
National Board of Review	14 February 1983	Top Foreign Films	Yılmaz Güney and Şerif Gören	Won	

== See also ==
- List of submissions to the 55th Academy Awards for Best Foreign Language Film
- List of Swiss submissions for the Academy Award for Best Foreign Language Film
