= Yılmaz Güney =

Kurdish filmmaker (1937–1984)

- Güney raises his fist while accepting the Palme d'Or award at the 1982 Cannes Film Festival
- Born: Yılmaz Pütün; 1 April 1937; Yenice, Yüreğir, Adana, Turkey
- Died: 9 September 1984 (aged 47); Paris, France
- Resting place: Pére Lachaise Cemetery, Paris, France
- Citizenship: Turkey (1937-1983 (Note: He was stripped of his Turkish citizenship in 1983 by then-president Kenan Evren)); Stateless (1983-1984)
- Occupations: Film director, film producer, screenwriter, actor, activist, poet
- Years active: 1958–1984
- Organization: Güney Film
- Notable work: Umut; Sürü; Düşman; Yol; Duvar
- Spouses: Nebahat Çehre (m. 1967; div. 1968) Fatoş Güney (m. 1970)
- Children: 2
- Awards: Palme d'Or (1982)
- Website: https://yilmazguneyofficial.com/

Yılmaz Güney (né Pütün; 1 April 1937 – 9 September 1984) was a Kurdish film director, screenwriter, novelist, actor and communist political activist. He quickly rose to prominence in the Turkish film industry. Many of his works were made from a far-left perspective and devoted to the plight of working-class people in Turkey. Güney won the Palme d'Or at the Cannes Film Festival in 1982 for the film Yol (The Road) which he co-directed with Şerif Gören. He was at constant odds with the Turkish government over the portrayal of Kurdish culture, people and language.

After being convicted of killing judge Sefa Mutlu in 1974 (a charge which he denied), Güney fled the country and was later stripped of his citizenship. A year before his death in 1983, he co-founded the Kurdish Institute of Paris together with the Kurdish poets Cegerxwîn and Hejar among others.

== Early life and education ==
Yılmaz Güney was born in 1937 in the village of Yenice in Adana province. His father, Hamit, who was from Siverek in Şanlıurfa province, moved to Yenice after both of his brothers were murdered. His mother was from Varto in Muş province. His parents migrated to Adana to work as labourers in the cotton fields and the young Yılmaz grew up surrounded by the Kurdish working class.

Besides working in the fields he had several other jobs including movie delivery boy, horse-cart driver and writing short stories for a local magazine. His first article was published in August 1955 and his first poem a week later while he was still attending high school. His writing brought him into difficulties with the authorities, especially for a short story he wrote about a person aiming for a better world, which was deemed Communist propaganda and for which he had to stand trial.

These experiences laid the ground for his future work which generally focused on a realistic portrayal of the downtrodden and marginalised in Turkish society. In 1957, Güney started studying law at Istanbul University but was quickly drawn into the film industry in which he already had connections from his time in Adana. In Istanbul he met the novelist Yaşar Kemal, who connected him with other people from Adana working in the Istanbul film industry.

== Film career in Turkey ==
Through Yeşilçam, the Turkish studio system, a handful of directors, including Atıf Yılmaz, began to use cinema as a means of addressing the problems of the people. Until then state-sanctioned melodramas, war films and adaptations of plays had mostly been performed in Turkish theatres. The new filmmakers began to shoot and screen more realistic images of Kurdish and Turkish life. Yılmaz Güney, a gruff-looking young actor who earned the moniker Çirkin Kral (Turkish: The Ugly King) or "Paşay Naşirîn" in Kurdish, was one of the most popular new names to emerge from this milieu. After working as an apprentice screenwriter for and assistant to Atıf Yılmaz, he began appearing in as many as twenty films a year and became one of Turkey's the most popular actors.

However, in 1957 Güney was accused of Communist propaganda just weeks after settling in Istanbul and was sentenced in May 1958 to seven and a half years imprisonment, a verdict against which he appealed. His conviction lead to his dismissal by his conservative employer, but brought him new employment with the left-wing Atıf Yılmaz who was preparing a movie based on a work of Yaşar Kemal. For this new job, he changed his surname from Putün to the Güney by which he is known today. Atif Yilmaz introduced him to a career as an actor which began in 1958 when he was the supporting actor in the movie The Children of the Fatherland (Turkish: Bu Vatanın Çocukları) before becoming a main character the same year in the movie Alageyik (Red Deer).

The appeals court in Istanbul reduced his prison sentence to one year and a half, but before he could enter prison, the juridical procedures were interrupted by the coup d'état in 1960. He was then imprisoned on 15 June 1961 on the grounds of the verdict before the coup and released in 1962. In prison he wrote what some labelled a Communist novel, They Died with Their Heads Bowed. Güney stayed loyal to his left-wing connections throughout his career and his relationship with the authorities became even more tense in the ensuing years.

Not satisfied with his star status in the Turkish film industry, Güney began directing his own pictures in 1965. From 1966 onwards he earned considerable amounts with the movies he produced which gave him some financial freedom. He and his partner Nebahat Çehre were able to leave their apartment in Beyoğlu and settle in uptown Levent. By 1968 he had formed his own production company, Güney Filmcilik (Güney Films). Over the next few years, the titles of his films mirrored the feelings of the underprivileged people of Turkey and he often portrayed people struggling against the mighty and powerful: Kasımpaşalı Recep (Recep from Kasımpaşa) or Konyakçı (the Cognac Drinker), both produced in 1965, are examples. Other movies he worked in are Umut (Hope, 1970); Ağıt (Elegy, 1972); Acı (Pain, 1971); and Umutsuz (The Hopeless, 1971). Umut is considered to have been the first realistic film of Turkish Cinema and the American director Elia Kazan was among the first to praise it, writing "Umut is a poetic film, completely native, not an imitation of Hollywood or any of the European masters, it had risen out of a village environment".

== Imprisonment ==
After the military coup in March 1971, Güney was in pretrial for weeks and decided to leave Istanbul to evade further trouble with the authorities. Arrested for harbouring anarchist students, he was jailed in 1972 during preproduction for Zavallılar (The Miserable, 1975), and before completing Endişe (Worry, 1974), which was finished by his assistant, Şerif Gören. This was a role that Gören would repeat over the next twelve years, directing several scripts that Güney wrote while in prison.

Released from prison in 1974 as part of a general amnesty, Güney was re-arrested that same year and charged with killing Sefa Mutlu, the judge of the Yumurtalık district in Adana province, who was shot dead in a nightclub during a drunken row. He was given a prison sentence of nineteen years but always declared his innocence. During his incarceration, his most successful screenplays were Sürü (The Herd, 1978) and Düşman (The Enemy, 1979), both directed by Zeki Ökten. Düşman won an Honourable Mention at the 30th Berlin International Film Festival in 1980. While in prison, Kazan visited and supported him, believing he had been jailed on account of his political activism.

== Personal life ==
Güney's first marriage was to fellow Turkish actor and Miss Turkey, Nebahat Çehre, who co-starred alongside Güney in several films. Their relationship began in 1964 and they married in 1967. Before his marriage, Güney fathered a daughter, Elif Güney Pütün, from his relationship with Birsen Can Ünal.

Güney and Nebahat Çehre divorced in 1968 after he tried to crush his wife with a car. In 2019 Çehre shared details of her relationship with Güney as a guest on the programme Şafak Yavuz's Visor.

In 1970 Güney remarried to Jale Fatma Süleymangil, more commonly known as Fatoş Güney. They had a son named Remzi Yılmaz Pütün.

== Exile and death ==
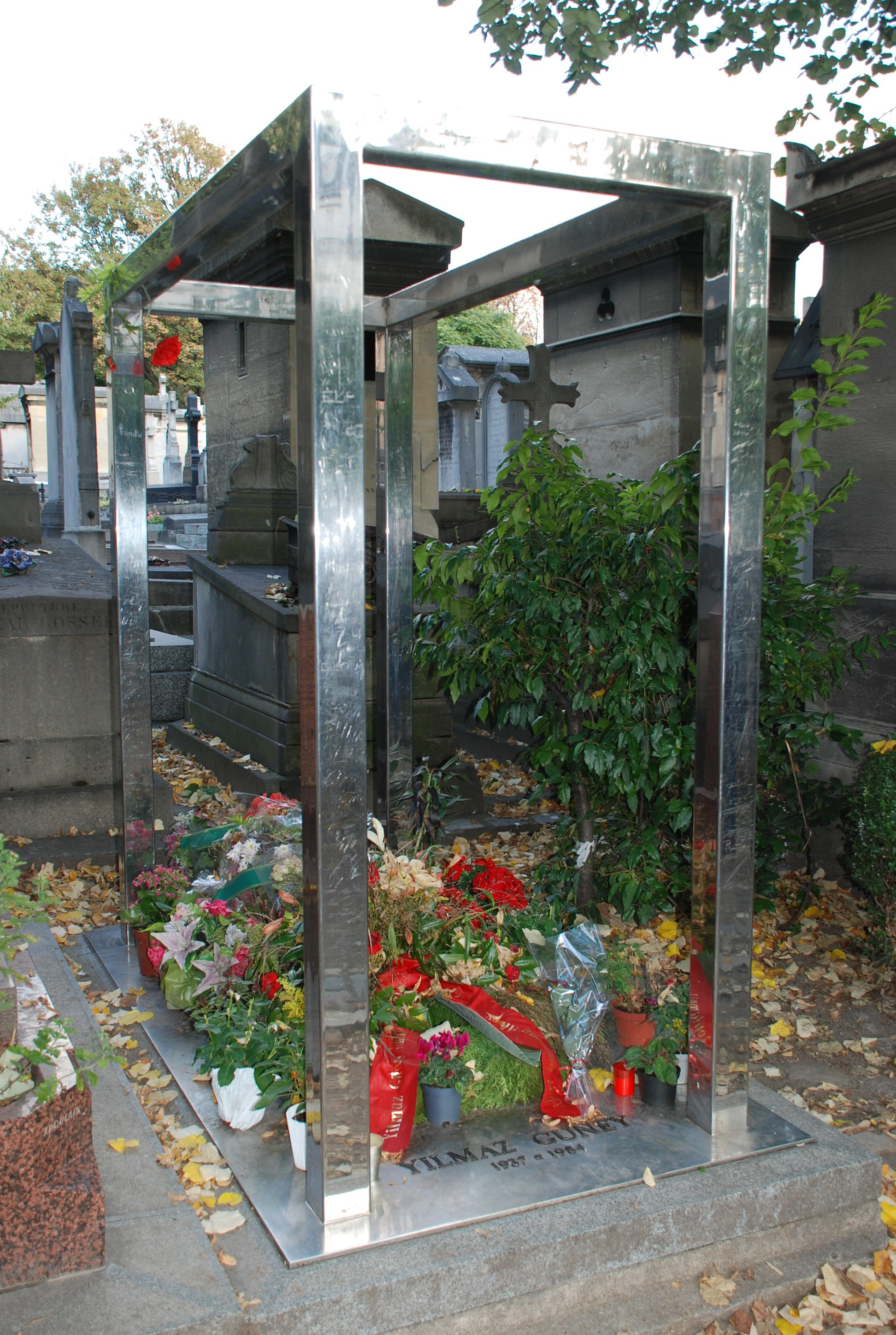
Güney's grave at Père Lachaise Cemetery, Paris

In September 1980, Güney's works were banned by the new military junta causing Güney to declare: "There are only two possibilities: to fight or to give up, I chose to fight". After escaping from prison in 1981 and fleeing to France, Güney won the Palme d'Or at the 1982 Cannes Film Festival for his film Yol (The Road) whose director in the field was once again Şerif Gören. It was not until 1983 that Güney resumed directing, telling a brutal tale of imprisoned children in his final film, Duvar (The Wall, 1983), which was made in France with the cooperation of the French government. Meanwhile, Turkey's government revoked his citizenship and a court sentenced him to another twenty-two years in jail in absentia.

Yılmaz Güney died of gastric cancer on 9 September 1984, in Paris, France. He is buried at the Père Lachaise Cemetery in Paris.

== Selected filmography ==
=== Actor ===
- Altın Kafes (1958)
- Gurbet (1959)
- Kalpaklılar (1959)
- Ala Geyik (1959)
- Bu Vatanın Çocukları (1959)
- Dolandırıcılar Şahı (1960)
- Taş Bebek (1960)
- Tatlı Bela (1961)
- Prangasız Mahkumlar (1964)
- Zımba Gibi Delikanlı (1964)
- Her Gün Ölmektense (1964)
- Kara Şahin (1964)
- On Korkusuz Adam (1964)
- Kocaoğlan (1964)
- Mor Defter (1964)
- Koçero (1964)
- Vurun Kahpeye (1964)
- Kamalı Zeybek (1964)
- Kan Gövdeyi Götürdü (1965)
- Kahreden Kurşun (1965)
- Gönül Kuşu (1965)
- Haracıma Dokunma (1965)
- Kanlı Buğday (1965)
- Kasımpaşalı (1965)
- Kasımpaşalı Recep (1965)
- Silaha Yeminliydim (1965)
- Torpido Yılmaz (1965)
- Kanlı Buğday (1965)
- Kahreden Kurşun (1965)
- Kasım Paşalı Recep (1965)
- Krallar Kralı (1965)
- Korkusuzlar (1965)
- Sayılı Kabadayılar (1965)
- Sokakta Kan Vardı (1965)
- Tehlikeli Adam (1965)
- Üçünüzü de Mıhlarım (1965)
- Yaralı Kartal (1965)
- Ben Öldükçe Yaşarım (1965)
- Beyaz Atlı Adam (1965)
- Sana Layık Değilim (1965)
- Dağların Oğlu (1965)
- Karaoğlan / Altay'dan Gelen Yiğit (1965)
- Davudo (1965)
- Konyakçı (1965)
- Çirkin Kral (1966)
- Bomba Kemal (1966)
- Silahların Kanunu (1966)
- Tilki Selim (1966)
- Yiğit Yaralı Ölür (1966)
- Anası Yiğit Doğurmuş (1966)
- Arslanların Dönüşü (1966)
- Esrefpaşalı (1966)
- Kibar Haydut (1966)
- Ve Silahlara Veda (1966)
- Yedi Dağın Aslanı (1966)
- Karaoğlan / Camoka'nın intikamı (1966)
- Çingene (1966)
- Bir Millet Uyanıyor (1966)
- Karaoğlan / Baybora'nın Oğlu (1966)
- At Avrat Silah (1966)
- Kovboy Ali (1967)
- At hırsızı Banus (1967)
- Balatlı Arif (1967)
- Bana Kurşun İşlemez (1967)
- Benim Adım Kerim (1967)
- Büyük Cellatlar (1967)
- Çirkin Kral Affetmez (1967)
- Eşkiya Celladı (1967)
- İnce Cumali (1967)
- Kızılırmak-Karakoyun (1967)
- Kozanoğlu (1967)
- Kuduz Recep (1967)
- Kurbanlık Katil (1967)
- Şeytanın Oğlu (1967)
- Hudutların Kanunu (1967)
- Kardeşim Benim (1968)
- Kargacı Halil (1968)
- Marmara Hasan (1968)
- Öldürmek Hakkımdır (1968)
- Pire Nuri (1968)
- Seyyit Han (1968)
- Aslan Bey (1968)
- Azrail Benim (1968)
- Beyoğlu Canavarı (1968)
- Can Pazarı (1968)
- Aç Kurtlar (1969)
- Belanın Yedi Türlüsü (1969)
- Bin Defa Ölürüm (1969)
- Çifte Tabancalı Kabadayı (1969)
- Güney Ölüm Saçıyor (1969)
- Kan Su Gibi Akacak (1969)
- Kurşunların Kanunu (1969)
- Bir Çirkin Adam (1969)
- Çifte Yürekli (1970)
- İmzam Kanla Yazılır (1970)
- Kanımın Son Damlasına Kadar (1970)
- Onu Allah Affetsin (1970)
- Piyade Osman (1970)
- Sevgili Muhafızım (1970)
- Şeytan Kayaları (1970)
- Son Kızgın Adam (1970)
- Yedi Belalılar (1970)
- Zeyno (1970)
- Canlı Hedef (1970)
- Umut (1970)
- Baba (1971)
- Çirkin ve Cesur (1971)
- Kaçaklar (1971)
- Namus ve Silah (1971)
- Umutsuzlar (1971)
- Vurguncular (1971)
- İbret (1971)
- Sahtekar (1972)
- Mahşere Kadar (1972)
- Ağıt (1972)
- Rabia (İlk Kadın Evliya) (1973)
- Arkadaş (1974)
- ince Memet Vuruldu (1975)
- Zavallılar (1975)

=== Director ===
- At Avrat Silah (1966)
- Bana Kurşun İşlemez (1967)
- Benim Adım Kerim (1967)
- Pire Nuri (1968)
- Seyyit Han (1968)
- Aç Kurtlar (1969)
- Bir Çirkin Adam (1969)
- Umut (1970)
- Baba (1971)
- Umutsuzlar (1971)
- Yarın Son Gündür (1971)
- Acı (1971)
- Ağıt (1971)
- Vurun Kahpeye (1973)
- Arkadaş (1974)
- Zavallılar (1975)
- Duvar (1983)

=== Writer ===
- Karacaoğlan'ın Kara Sevdası (1959)
- Yaban Gülü (1961)
- Ölüme Yalnız Gidilir (1962)
- İkisi de Cesurdu (1963)
- Her gün Ölmektense (1964)
- Kamalı Zeybek (1964)
- Prangasız Mahkumlar (1964)
- Koçero (1964)
- Konyakçı (1965)
- Kasımpaşalı (1965)
- Krallar Kralı (1965)
- Gönül Kuşu (1965)
- Kasımpaşalı Recep (1965)
- Hudutların Kanunu (1966)
- Bana Kurşun İşlemez (1967)
- Benim Adım Kerim (1967)
- Çirkin Kral Affetmez (1967)
- Şeytanın Oğlu (1967)
- At Hırsızı Banuş (1967)
- Canlı Hedef (1970)
- Piyade Osman (1970)
- İbret (1971)
- Kaçaklar (1971)
- Baba (1971)
- Endişe (1974)
- Surü (1978)
- Düşman (1979)
- Yol (1982)

== Biography ==
A biography of Güney, Halkın Sanatçısı, Halkın Savaşçısı: Yılmaz Güney (The People's Artist, The People's Warrior: Yılmaz Güney), was published by Dönüşüm Publishing in 1992 and reprinted in 2000. In 2001 its publisher was fined for some of its content, although this was overturned in 2003 when the relevant law was repealed. The first Kurdish language biography of Güney titled Yilmaz Guney by Karzan Kardozi, was published by Xazalnus Publication in Sulaymaniyah in 2018.

== Films about Guney ==
- We Called Him the Ugly King (Claude Weisz, 1988)
- Yilmaz Guney: His Life, His Films (Jane Cousins-Mills, 1987)
- Yilmaz Guney: Rebel with a Cause (Karzan Kardozi, 2013)
- The Ballad of Exiles Yilmaz Guney (Ilker Savaskurt, 2016)
- The Legend of the Ugly King (Hüseyin Tabak, 2017)

== See also ==
- List of Turkish film directors

== Notes ==
Awards
Preceded by Ekrem Bora	Golden Orange Award for Best Actor; 1967 for Hudutların Kanunu	Succeeded by Fikret Hakan
Preceded by newly established	Golden Boll Award for Best Actor; 1969 for Seyyit Han 1970 for Umut; 1971 for Ağıt	Succeeded by Kadir İnanır
Preceded by Safa Önal	Golden Boll Award for Best Screenplay; 1970 for Umut 1971 for Ağıt	Succeeded by not awarded
Preceded by Cüneyt Arkın	Golden Orange Award for Best Actor; 1970 for Bir Çirkin Adam	Succeeded by Fikret Hakan
Preceded by Bilge Olgaç	Golden Boll Award for Best Director; 1971 for Ağıt	Succeeded by Ertem Eğilmez
Preceded by Sadık Şendil	Golden Orange Award for Best Screenplay; 1975 for Endişe	Succeeded by Umur Bugay
Preceded by Andrzej Wajda	[[Palme d`Or for Best Film]] 1982 for Yol	Succeeded by Shōhei Imamura
