= Zavallılar =

1974 Turkish drama film by Yılmaz Güney

- Directed by: Yılmaz Güney
- Written by: Yılmaz Güney; Atıf Yılmaz
- Produced by: Güney Film
- Starring: Yılmaz Güney; Yıldırım Önal; Göktürk Güney; Hülya Şengül; Hakkı Güvenç; Güven Şengil
- Music by: Şanar Yurdatapan, Attila Özdemiroğlu
- Production company: Güney Film
- Distributed by: TurkishFilmChannel
- Release date: 1974 (Turkey)
- Country: Turkey
- Language: Turkish

Zavallılar is a 1974 Turkish film directed by Yılmaz Güney and written by Yılmaz Güney and Atıf Yılmaz. The cast includes Yılmaz Güney, Yıldırım Önal, Göktürk Güney, Hülya Şengül, Hakkı Güvenç, and Güven Şengil. It was produced by Güney Film.

After Güney had begun to shoot the film, he was imprisoned for sheltering anarchist students at his home. The destiny of Zavallılar seemed to be similar to other unfinished films such as Sergei Eisenstein’s Que Viva Mexico! and Marilyn Monroe’s Something's Got to Give. Güney planned to finish this film after his release, but as he wound up behind bars, he was unable to finish it. However, in the archives there were about 30 minutes of footage, and Atıf Yılmaz built upon this with fundamental changes in the scenario. Thus, Zavallılar has a reputation as being an “outer” film of the man from the “inside”.

In Güney's films, prison has always been a symbol referring to the first or last station of the bad fate or of being trapped. Prison has been a part of both his films and his individual life. In Zavallılar, however, prison is a place sheltering poor, unemployed, and desperate people and a place where they can eat their fill.

Zavallılar is a film with 3 protagonists: Abuzer (performed by Yılmaz Güney), Arap (performed by Güven Şengil), and Hacı (performed by Yıldırım Önal). The “wretches” are people crushed, looked down, excluded by the society, they are real miserables. The film begins with the anxiety of the protagonists about their coming out. They beg to stay at least until spring, because they do not have anyone or any place to which they belong to. The film shows retrospectively the facts that caused them to go behind bars. While telling their story, Yılmaz and Güney touch sorespots of the society, and refer to certain deviating situations.

Arap has been imprisoned because of his employer, against whose unjust behaviour he opposed. His employer promised him a place in a building, that he would use as a little teahouse in return to stand guard of the building during its construction without pay. However, after the construction the employer dishonours his promise, and Arap tried to fight, but he finds himself at the prison. The labour under an illusionment of Arap symbolizes the labor exploitation and lack of social security.

Hacı has been imprisoned because of the double-crossing of a prostitute, whom he dreamed to live with. Hacı's drama does not only narrates loneliness and lovelessness. At the same time, it shows the by-products of the capitalist order, which develop alongside but which are not visible as long as one “keeps out”, like worthlessness, prostitution, procuration, and bravado. Abuzer saw his mother killing a man, to whom her husband sold her. After that, Abuzer is pushed to evilness and crime, as he does not have any shelter or a family anymore. The last scene is one which becomes imprinted in the memory of those who watch the film. It makes the fact visible, what an innocent child can become due to the lack of social conscience.

Zavallılar sets forth a lot of problems and conflicts without mentioning their roots. With this approach Güney continues, with the help of Yılmaz, his documentary behaviour. It shows realities without any interpretation to the audience. Again, Zavallılar has an uncertain end, as in Umut and most of his other films.
