= Bilge Olgaç =

Turkish film director (1940–1994)

- Born: 10 January 1940; Vize, Turkey
- Died: 3 March 1994 (aged 54); Istanbul, Turkey
- Occupations: Screenwriter, film director

Bilge Olgaç (10 January 1940 – 3 March 1994) was a Turkish film director.

== Life ==
Bilge Olgaç was born to a poor family in Vize, a town in Kırklareli Province on 10 January 1940. While still in vocational school in Istanbul, she married Vecdi Bender in 1956. She had a son by this marriage. They divorced. In 1994, she had moved to a new house in Beyoğlu, Istanbul. She died during a fire in this house on 3 March 1994.

== Career ==
She was writing short stories. Her husband, who was a film industry employee, introduced her to Memduh Ün, a film producer and a director. In 1962, Memduh Ün made a film out of one of her stories Kısmetin En Güzeli ("Best of the Fortune"). She also began working as an assistant of Memduh Ün. In 1965, she directed her first film Üçünüze de Mıhlarım ("I Shall Shoot Three of You"). She was the sole female film director at that time. She also wrote the script of many of her films. In 1970, she directed Linç ("Lynch"), which earned her fame and many awards. Between 1975 and 1984, she directed commercial films. In 1984, she returned to movie films by her new film Kaşık Düşmanı ("Ball and Chain"). In the same year, she also made Yavrularım ("My Little Ones"), which was a big success. Her later films are on women's issues in rural areas. Although she mostly made movie films in 1987, she also directed a television serial Elif Ana-Ayşe Kız ("Mommy Elif – Maid Ayşe"). When she died she was about to finish her last film Bir Yanımız Bahar Bahçe ("Spring Garden on One Side") The number of films directed by Bilge Olgaç is 37.

== Legacy ==
The annual awards given by the Flying Broom International Women's Film Festival are named after Bilge Olgaç.

== Awards ==
- 1970: Linç International Adana Film Festival (Altın Koza) Best Director
- 1984: Kaşık Düşmanı International Antalya Film Festival (Altın Portakal) Best Screenplay
- 1985: Kaşık Düşmanı Créteil International Women's Film Festival Grand Prix
