= Costis Hadjimichalis =

Greek urban planner and academic

Prof. Costis Hadjimichalis
- Occupations: Economic geographer, urban planner, author, academic
- Title: Professor Emeritus

Academic background
- Education: Arch. Dipl. Ing. (1968), M.A. in urban planning (UCLA, 1976), Ph.D. in Economic Geography and Regional Planning (UCLA, 1980)
- Alma mater: UCLA

Academic work
- Discipline: Geography
- Sub-discipline: Economic geography, urban and regional planning
- Institutions: Harokopio University
- Main interests: Economic geography, uneven regional development in the EU, Southern Europe, the Balkans and Greece, informal modes of production and SMEs, contemporary cultural landscapes, politics and planning, radical cultural geography.

Costis Hadjimichalis is a Greek radical urban planner, economic geographer, author, and academic. Hadjimichalis is former Professor economic geography and regional planning and Head of the Department at Harokopio University of Athens. He is known for his work from a Marxist perspective on uneven geographical development in economic geography, urban planning, and regional development with a specific focus on Greece, the EU, and Southern Europe. He is editor of the Greek academic journal Geographies and section editor for Regional Development of the International Encyclopaedia of Human Geography, Elsevier. From 1983 to 2013, he was co-organizer of the International Aegean Seminars, a forum for radical ideas on geography and planning. Hadjimichalis graduated with an engineering degree from The Aristotle University of Thessaloniki in 1968, then an M.A. in urban planning (1976) and a Ph.D. in Economic Geography and Urban Planning (1980) from UCLA.

== Bibliography ==
=== Select books ===
- Crisis Spaces: Structures, Struggles and Solidarity in Southern Europe (2017) ISBN 9780367360139
- Debt Crisis and Land Dispossession (2014) ISBN 9789606750991
- Space in Left Thought (Ο Χώρος στην Αριστερή Σκέψη) (2012) co-author Dina Vaiou (in Greek), nissos ISBN 9789609535373
- Hadjimichalis, Costis. Uneven development and regionalism: State, territory and class in Southern Europe. Routledge, (1987 & 2005). ISBN 9780709937005

=== Select journal articles ===
- Hadjimichalis, Costis. "Place and economic development." The Routledge Handbook of Place, (2020), pp 535–544, Routledge.
- Hadjimichalis, Costis, and Ray Hudson. "Contemporary crisis across Europe and the crisis of regional development theories." Regional Studies 48.1 (2014): 208–218.
- Hadjimichalis, Costis. "Uneven geographical development and socio-spatial justice and solidarity: European regions after the 2009 financial crisis." European Urban and Regional Studies 18.3 (2011): 254–274.
- Hadjimichalis, Costis, and Ray Hudson. "Rethinking local and regional development: implications for radical political practice in Europe." European Urban and Regional Studies 14.2 (2007): 99–113.
- Hadjimichalis, Costis, and Ray Hudson. "Networks, regional development and democratic control." International Journal of Urban and Regional Research 30.4 (2006): 858–872.
- Hadjimichalis, Costis. "The end of Third Italy as we knew it?." Antipode 38.1 (2006): 82–106.
- Hadjimichalis, Costis. "Imagining rurality in the new Europe and dilemmas for spatial policy." European Planning Studies 11.2 (2003): 103–113.
- Soja, Edward W., and Costis Hadjimichalis. "Between geographical materialism and spatial fetishism." Antipode 11.3 (1979): 3–11.
