= Çarşamba, Fatih =

Quarter in Istanbul, Turkey

Çarşamba
- Quarter
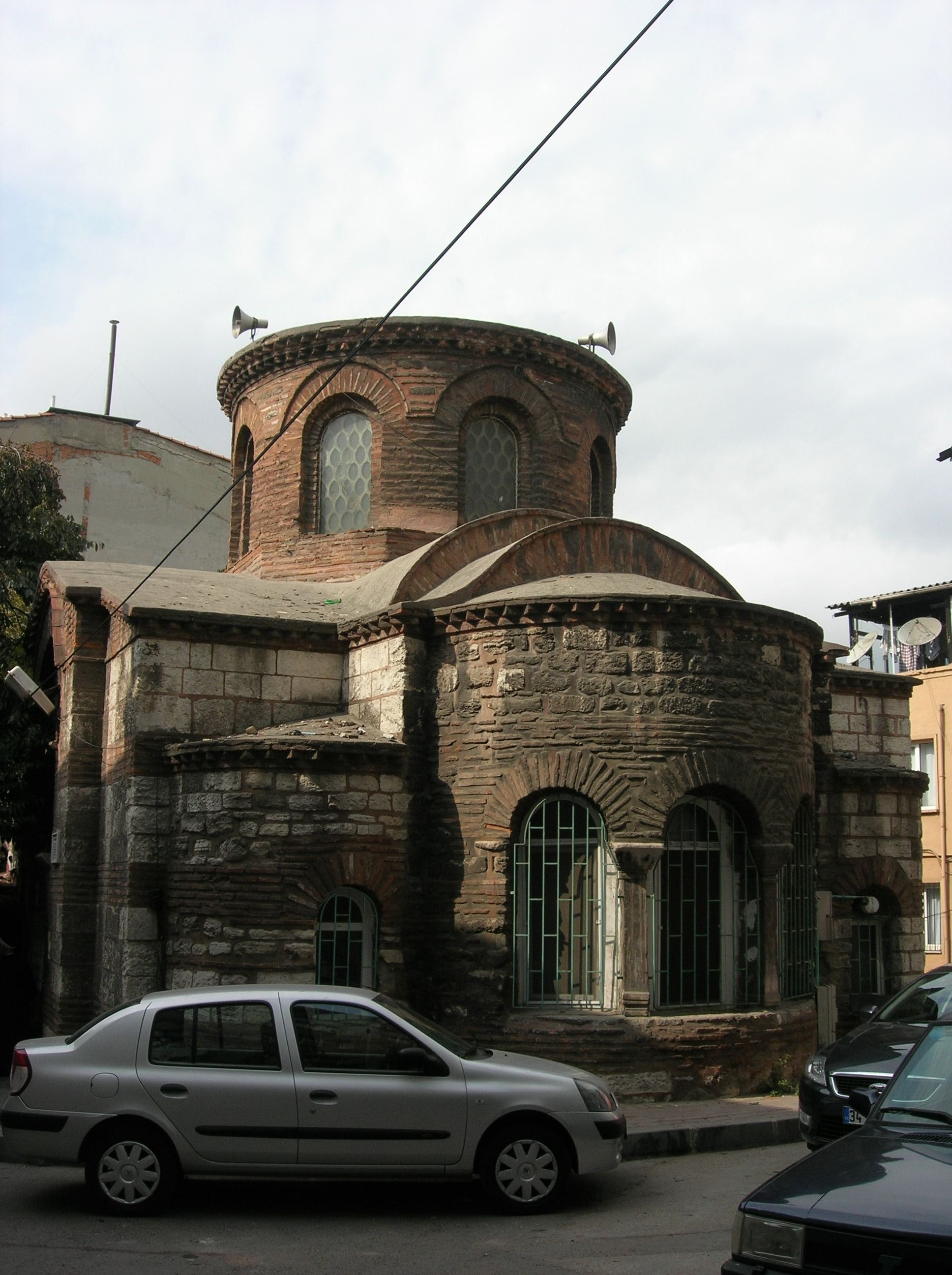
- Çarşamba: The Mosque of Hirami Ahmet Pasha.

- Location within Istanbul Fatih
- Coordinates: 41°01′40.28″N 28°56′44.84″E
- Country: Turkey
- Region: Marmara
- Province: Istanbul
- District: Fatih
- Time zone: UTC+3 (TRT)
- Area code: 0212

Çarşamba (English: "Wednesday") is a small part of the Fatih district of Istanbul, Turkey, close to the Fatih Mosque. It is one of the most conservative areas of the city.

According to the 17th-century Ottoman traveler Evliya Çelebi, the district takes its name from the town of Çarşamba on the Black Sea coast since, after the fall of Constantinople in 1453, this part of the city was repopulated with people from Çarşamba. However, others think it acquired its name from the large Wednesday (Çarşamba in Turkish) Market held here every week.

The neighbourhood is home to two Byzantine churches that were converted into mosques after the Conquest of Constantinople in 1453: the Fethiye and Hirami Ahmet Pasha mosques.

Çarşamba is also home to the Sultan Selim Mosque, built by Sultan Suleiman the Magnificent for his father Yavuz Sultan Selim (Selim the Grim in English) whose shrine stands in the grounds. The mosque is usually attributed to Mimar Sinan although there is no record of it in the official list of his works. It was a favourite with the Swiss-French architect Le Corbusier who admired its simplicity of form.

Here, too, is the İsmail Ağa Mosque, built in 1724, and named after a Şeyhülislam named İsmail Efendi (1645-1725). Its congregation has a particular reputation for conservatism.

== Sources ==
- Mamboury, Ernest (1953). The Tourists' Istanbul. Istanbul: Çituri Biraderler Basımevi.
