= Şerif Gören =

Turkish film director (1944–2024)

- Born: 1 July 1944; Xanthi, Greece
- Died: 8 December 2024 (aged 80); Beyoğlu, Istanbul, Turkey
- Cause of death: Falling
- Occupation: Film director
- Years active: 1962–2024

Şerif Gören (Greek: Σερίφ Γκιορέν, romanized: Seríf Gkiorén, 1 July 1944 – 8 December 2024) was a Turkish film director. Aside from important films under his own signature, he was also the winner of the Palme d'Or ("Golden Palm") award in Cannes Film Festival in 1982 for the film Yol, which he had directed on behalf of Yılmaz Güney, who at the time was serving a prison sentence for the murder of Yumurtalık judge Sefa Mutlu.

Gören started his film career as an editor, and then continued as an assistant director to Yılmaz Güney. He and Güney started directing Endişe (The Anxiety) in 1974, in the beginning of which Güney was arrested and sent to prison. Gören continued directing the film, which makes it the first film directed by him. The Anxiety was a successful movie which won six awards at the 12th Antalya Film Festival in 1975 including Best National Film and Best National Director. He directed more than thirty films in a decade. His activities also brought some trouble. As he served as the chairman of the Film Directors Association during 1979–80, he was arrested in the aftermath of the 1980 military coup. After his release he started directing the film Yol in 1981.

Gören died of complications from a fall on 8 December 2024, at the age of 80.

== Filmography ==
- Umut (1970) (Hope, co-director for Yılmaz Güney)
- Endişe (The Anxiety) (1974)
- Köprü (The Bridge) (1975)
- Deprem (The Earthquake) (1976)
- İki Arkadaş (Two Friends) (1976)
- Taksi Şoförü (Taxi Driver) (1976)
- İstasyon (1977)
- Nehir (The River) (1977)
- Derdim Dünyadan Büyük (1978)
- Gelincik (1978)
- Almanya, Acı Vatan (1979)
- Aşkı Ben mi Yarattım? (1979)
- Kır Gönlünün Zincirini (1980)
- Feryada Gücüm Yok (1981)
- Herhangi Bir Kadın (1981)
- Yılanı Öldürseler (1981)
- Yol (1982) (The Way, on behalf of Yılmaz Güney)
- Alişan (1982)
- Tomruk (1982)
- Derman (1983)
- Güneşin Tutulduğu Gün (1983)
- Firar (The Escape) (1984)
- Güneş Doğarken (While The Sun Rises) (1984)
- Kurbağalar (The Frogs) (1985)
- Adem İle Havva (Adam and Eve) (1986)
- Kan (The Blood) (1986)
- On Kadın (Ten Women) (1987)
- Polizei (1988, Germany)
- Abuk Sabuk Bir Film (1990)
- Amerikalı (The American) (1993)
- Kırık Ayna (2002) (mini) TV series
- Serseri Aşıklar (2003) (mini) TV series
- Ah İstanbul (2006)

Awards
Preceded by Ömer Lütfi Akad	Golden Orange Award for Best Director; 1975 for Endişe	Succeeded by Atıf Yılmaz
