= Adana Golden Boll Film Festival =

Film festival in Turkey

- Location: Turkey
- Established: 1969
- Most recent: 2025
- Hosted by: Adana Cinema Club

Current= 31st
- 32nd 30th

Adana Golden Boll Film Festival (Turkish: Adana Altın Koza Film Festivali), known between 2016 and 2018 as International Adana Film Festival (Uluslararası Adana Film Festivali), is a film festival in Adana, Turkey, that was held five times between 1969 and 1974 and every year since 2005. The event is organized by the Adana Metropolitan Municipality and takes place in June. Beginning from 2006, the scope of the festival is broadened to an international dimension within the framework of the cinema in Mediterranean basin countries.

The festival, taking its name from cotton boll, the traditional crop grown in the region, includes national feature films along with international short subjects (since 2006) and student films of young Mediterranean filmmakers (from 2008 on). The 15th edition of the festival was held between June 2–8, 2008.

== History ==
The Altın Koza Film Festival was organized for the first time in 1969 jointly by the Adana Cinema Club, Adana Municipality and the State Films Archives under the simple name "Film Festival". The event recurred until 1973 uninterrupted. However, in 1974 it came to an end, discontinuing 18 years long. In 1992, the festival was revived with its 6th edition and was held until 1997 under the name "Altın Koza Culture, Arts and Film Festival". Due to earthquakes occurred in 1998 and 1999, and later because of economical reasons, the festival could not be continued for seven successive years. In 2005, the Altın Koza Festival resumed with its 12th edition. In 2009, in celebration of its 40th anniversary, the festival published a catalogue prepared by Burçak Evren and edited by Candan Yaygın on the recipients of its honorary awards in its past editions. In July 2019, Adana's new elected opposition party mayor reverted the name back to the Golden Boll.

== Awards ==
The Golden Boll awards are given in three film categories.

=== National feature film competition ===
Money prizes are given in major categories and a Golden Boll statuette is awarded in addition in all the categories:

Picture awards

- Grand Jury Best Picture: TRY 250,000 (approx. US$205,000)
- Grand Jury Yılmaz Güney Best Picture: TRY 75,000 (approx. US$61,500)
- Audience Jury Best Picture: TRY 50,000 (approx. US$41,000)

Director awards

- Best Director: TRY 50,000 (approx. US$41,000)
- Best Camera Direction
- Best Art Direction

Actor awards

- Best Actress
- Best Actor
- Best Supporting Actress
- Best Supporting Actor
- Most Promising Newcomer (actress)
- Most Promising Newcomer (actor)

Screenplay, music and cinematography awards

- Best Screenplay
- Best Music
- Best Cinematography
- Best Film Editing

=== Student films competition ===
This competition, from 2008 on international, aims to encourage the young filmmakers, who are still students. A Golden Boll statuette is awarded along with money prizes in all categories.

- Best Fiction Picture: TRY 5,000 (approx. US$4,100)
- Best Animation Picture: TRY 5,000 (approx. US$4,100)
- Best Documentary Picture: TRY 5,000 (approx. US$4,100)
- Best Experimental Picture: TRY 5,000 (approx. US$4,100)

=== Mediterranean countries international short subject competition ===
This contest is dedicated to the promotion of the development of short subjects and creative film making in countries bordering the Mediterranean Sea. The festival only accepts short subjects no longer than 20 minutes and documentary films no longer than 30 minutes in English, with English subtitles or sent with English dialogue list.

- Best Fiction Picture: US$ 4,000
- Best Animation Picture: US$ 4,000
- Best Documentary Picture: US$ 4,000
- Best Experimental Picture: US$ 4,000
- Special Jury awards for each category: US$ 1,000

== See also ==
- Film festivals in Turkey
