= Kurdish culture =

Culture of the Kurdish people

Kurdish culture is a group of distinctive cultural traits practiced by Kurdish people. The Kurdish culture is a legacy from ancient peoples who shaped modern Kurds and their society.

Kurds are an Iranian ethnic group who live in the northern Middle East, in a region that the Kurds call Greater Kurdistan. Greater Kurdistan lies along the Zagros Mountains and the Taurus Mountains, and today comprises northeastern Iraq, northwestern Iran, northeastern Syria, and southeastern Turkey.

== Miscellaneous ==
There is a lot of controversy about the Kurdish people from their origins, their history, and even their political future. Kurds are one of the largest ethnic groups that do not have an independent state recognized universally.

== Language ==
Kurdish language (Kurdish: Zimanê Kurdî) is a branch of the Indo-European language family. with ancient roots that still retains its structure and form. Kurdish is divided into two branches, Kurmanji and Gorani. The Goranî branch Hewramî and Zazakî (Kirdkî-Kirmanckî). Kurmanji branch itself include three sub-branches: North Kurmanji (Botanî, Badînanî), Central Kurmancî (Soranî) and South Kurmanji (Kelhurî-Lekî).

Kurdish language has two writing systems. The majority of Kurds (Kurmanji branch) write with the Latin alphabet (standard) and the rest with the Arabic alphabet (reformed).

== Folklore ==
The Kurds have a rich folkloric tradition which is increasingly endangered as a result of modernization, urbanization, and cultural repression. Kurds celebrate the new year on Newroz, and its celebration was often banned by authorities in Turkey and Syria. A well known Kurdish tale is Mem û Zîn.

=== Zembîlfiroş ===
Zembilfrosh (Kurdish: Zembîlfiroş) (Kurdish for "basket seller") is a folktale popular in Turkish Kurdistan and Iraqi Kurdistan. Zembîlfiroş was the son of a powerful Kurdish ruler who left his home and life behind to seek a spiritual life as a dervish. He wanders the countryside with his faithful wife, surviving by making and selling baskets. One day they arrive in the capital of a Kurdish emirate, where the prince's wife sees Zembîlfiroş and falls in love with him. She summons him to the castle, where she declares her love for him and tries to seduce him. Zembîlfiroş declines, but she presses, promising him many riches. Zembîlfiroş is not persuaded and she locks him in a castle tower, from which he eventually escapes. The prince's wife then disguises herself and starts searching for Zembîlfiroş, and eventually finds him. She then deceives Zembîlfiroş's wife, convincing her to lend her her clothes and leave the house. When Zembîlfiroş returns that night, it is dark and he does not recognize the prince's wife, who welcomes him into bed. However, a silver anklet gives her away, and he runs off, chased after by his would-be-lover. As Zembîlfiroş sees that escape is impossible, he prays to God, supplicating to be released from a world of misery, and God complies. Reaching Zembîlfiroş's lifeless body, the prince's wife is so heartbroken that she dies as well. They are then buried side by side. Their resting place is claimed to be located at the contemporary town of Batifa, a subdistrict of the district of Zakho, Duhok governorate, in Iraqi Kurdistan.

== Music ==
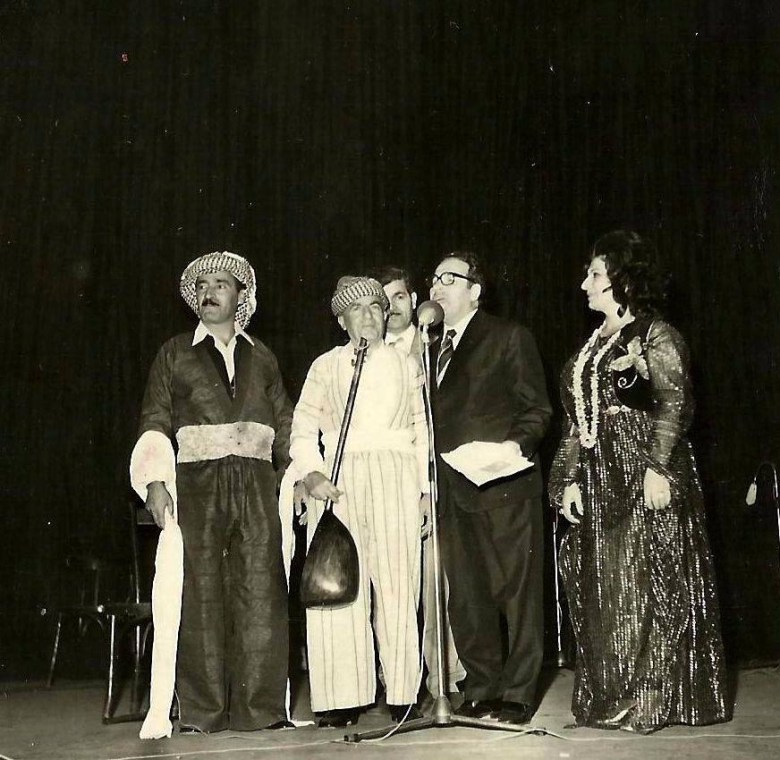
A Kurdish folk music group - Îsa Berwarî and Mihemed Arif Cizîrî

Kurdish folk music is an important part of Kurdish culture and has traditionally been used to transmit stories about Kurdish history by Dengbêj. Dengbêj (bards, literally "voice-sing") are well known for songs of mourning, or stran. Many popular Kurdish musicians of the 20th century like Hesen Zîrek and Ahmet Kaya sang in Turkish or Persian as well as in Kurdish.

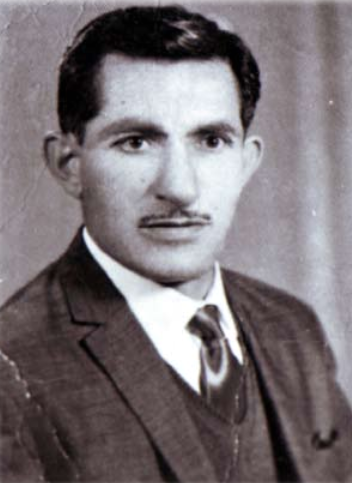
Hesen Zîrek - Composer and folk Singer

== Cinema ==
Kurdish cinema focuses on the Kurdish people and culture. The fate of the Kurds as a people without a state shaped their cinema. Kurdish films often show social grievances, oppression, torture, human rights violations, and life as a stranger. Kurdish cinema has a high significance for the Kurds, as it offers the opportunity to draw attention to their own situation artistically. However, because of state repression, most films are produced in exile. The best example of this is in Turkey, where Kurds were not permitted to speak their native language until 1991, which made the development of their films more difficult.

Films about Kurds:

- Zare (Hamo Beknazarian, 1926)
- The Herd (Yilmaz Güney, 1978)
- Yol (Yılmaz Güney, 1982)
- A Time for Drunken Horses (Bahman Ghobadi, 2000)
- Turtles Can Fly? (Bahman Ghobadi, 2004)
- 1,001 Apples (Taha Karimi, 2013)
- I Want To Live (Karzan Kardozi, 2015)
- Bakur (Çayan Demirel, 2015)

== Cuisine ==
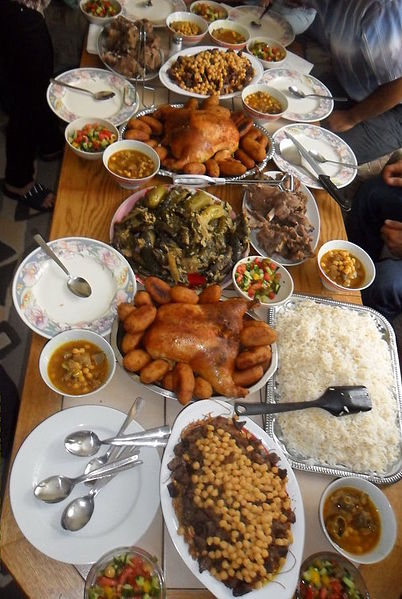
Traditional Kurdish food

Food is widely recognized to be a fundamental part of what it means to be Kurdish. Foods such as kfta کفتە (spiced minced meat cased in thin layer of mashed pudding rice), Ser u pe (goats head, tongue and feet), shifta (meat patties), are traditional Kurdish foods. Lamb and chicken have been staple meats in Kurdish cuisine for centuries. Vegetables, pilaf, and dairy products also comprise a large portion of traditional Kurdish food. Tea is also staple to a Kurdish diet. It is commonly drunk 2-3 times a day as a social activity. Kurds also drink Mastaw/Do'h/Ayran, a yogurt-based drink.

== Religion ==
The Kurdish people have different religions depending on their ethnic connections and the country in which they live. The most common religion among Kurds is Sunni Islam, practiced by 98% of Kurds living in Iraqi Kurdistan. The Kurds of Turkey are 30% Alevi out of a population of approximately 15–22 million Kurds and 68% follow Sunni Islam.

Christian Kurds

The Orthodox Christian Kurds can be called one of the oldest Christian minorities in the Middle East. Although they are a small and limited community, they pay great attention to their cultural and ethnic values. Their crosses, symbols and clothes are unique and prominent and tied to their national culture and symbols. Father Madai Maamdi, a Kurdish Orthodox priest, has taken important steps in recent years to preserve and spread the religious-cultural values of Christian Kurds.

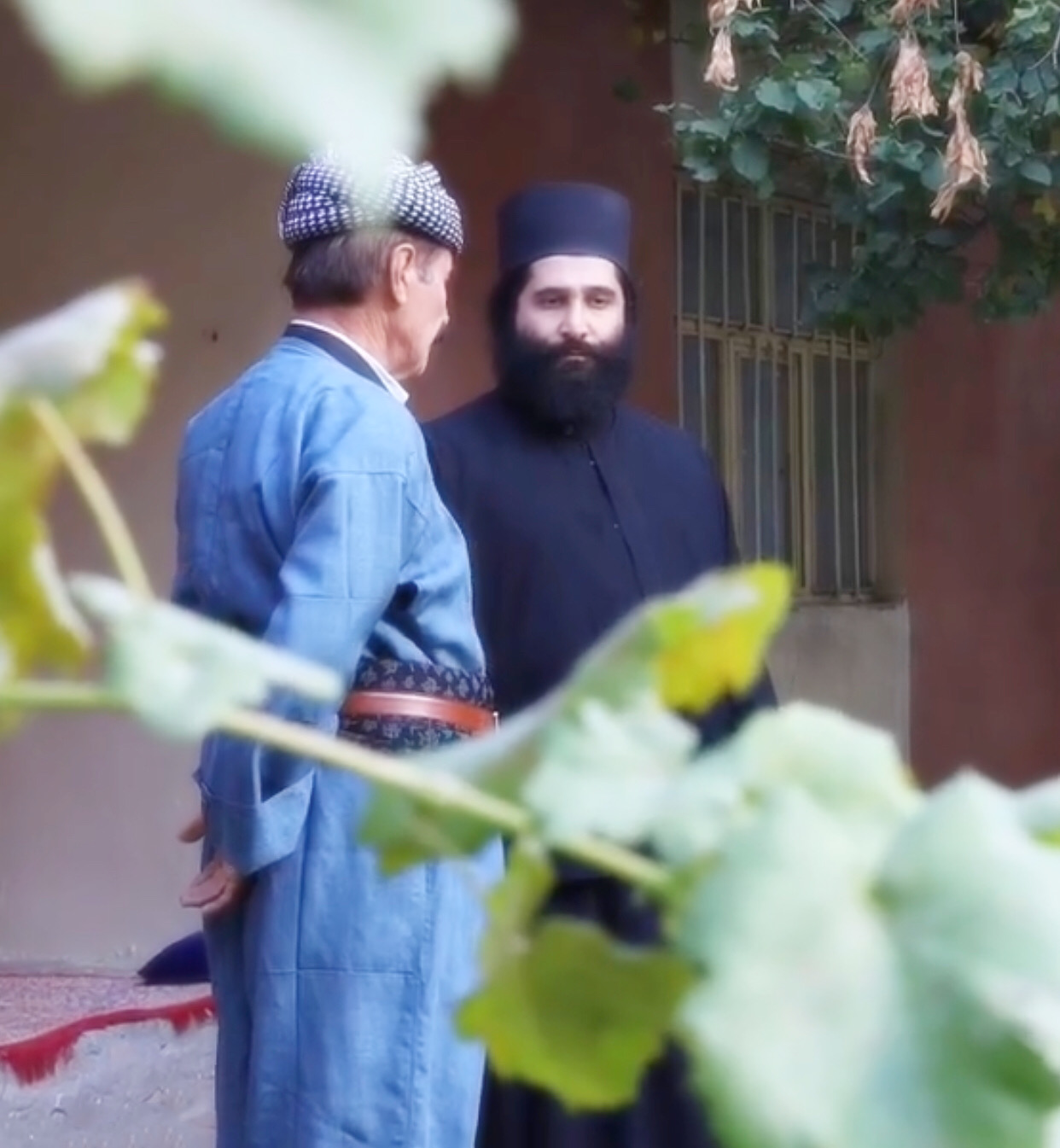
Fr. Madai Maamdi (Kurdish Orthodox priest)

== See also ==
- Kurdish traditional clothing
- Kurdish cinema
- Kurdish dance
- Kurdish rugs
- Deq (tattoo)
