= Kolbari =

Kolbari may refer to:

- the work of a kolbar, a border porters who carry goods across borders
- alternative spelling of Kalbari, a village in Bangladesh
