= Take It Easy Hospital =

- Origin: Tehran, Iran
- Genres: Pop, electronic
- Members: Ash Koosha; Negar
- Website: www.takeiteasyhospital.co.uk

Take It Easy Hospital was a London-based duo from Iran. Formed by singer and producer Ash Koosha a.k.a. Ashkan Kooshanejad and singer-songwriter Negar Shaghaghi in Tehran.

Their first single demo song Human Jungle was recorded in July 2008 as a single from the follow-up EP "Human Jungle" leading them to record the Singles "My Sleepy Fall" and "Chasing The Sun".

The two starred in the award-winning fiction-documentary film No One Knows About Persian Cats by Iranian director Bahman Ghobadi in 2009. The film which was made without a permit follows their story trying to find live members to play in some festivals in the UK. Due to the film's success and the post election turmoil during the summer of 2009 in Iran, Kooshanejad, Shaghaghi and Ghobadi were forced to ask for asylum and have not been able to return since.

== Filmography ==
- No One Knows About Persian Cats (2009)

== Discography ==
=== "No one knows about persian cats (original soundtrack)" (2010) ===
Four of Take It Easy Hospital's songs are on the soundtrack from the film No One Knows About Persian Cats, being released worldwide over 2010.

- "Human Jungle"
- "Scenarios and Starlights"
- "Me and You"
- "My Sleepy Fall"
