= Tatinakhali =

Coordinates: 22.25931°N 89.22726°E

Datinakhali is a village in Buri Goalini Union, Shyamnagar Upazila, Satkhira District, Bangladesh. Its villagers obtain drinking water from the nearby village of Kalbari.

== See also ==
- List of villages in Bangladesh
- Upazilas of Bangladesh
- Districts of Bangladesh
- Divisions of Bangladesh
