= Half Moon (film) =

2006 Kurdish drama film by Bahman Ghobadi

- Theatrical release poster
- Sorani Kurdish: نیوەمانگ
- Directed by: Bahman Ghobadi
- Screenplay by: Behnam Behzadi; Bahman Ghobadi
- Produced by: Bahman Ghobadi
- Starring: Ismail Ghaffari; Golshifteh Farahani; Hedieh Tehrani
- Cinematography: Nigel Bluck; Crighton Bone
- Edited by: Hayedeh Safiyari
- Music by: Hossein Alizadeh
- Production companies: The Match Factory GmbH; Mij Film Co.; New Crowned Hope; Silkroad Production
- Distributed by: CTV International (France); Strand Releasing (USA)
- Release dates: 9 September 2006 (TIFF); 21 September 2006 (Donostia-San Sebastian International Film Festival); 14 December 2007 (USA); 11 July 2007 (France)
- Running time: 114 minutes
- Countries: Iran; Austria; France; Iraq
- Language: Sorani Kurdish
- Box office: $248,749

Half Moon (Sorani Kurdish: نیوەمانگ, romanized: Nîwemaň) is a 2006 internationally co-produced Kurdish comedy-drama film directed by Bahman Ghobadi, who co-wrote the screenplay with Behnam Behzadi, partly inspired by Wolfgang Amadeus Mozart's Requiem. The film stars Ismail Ghaffari as Mamo, an old legendary musician, who sets to trespass the borders of Iranian Kurdistan to give one final concert in Iraqi Kurdistan with his 10 sons.

Half Moon is a part of the New Crowned Hope film series, a celebration of the 250th birthday of Wolfgang Amadeus Mozart. The film is an international co-production of Iran, Austria, France and Iraq.

== Plot ==
Mamo, an old Kurdish musician in the twilight of his life, plans to perform one final concert in Iraqi Kurdistan. The village's elderly warn him that as the moon becomes full, something awful would happen to him and urge him not to proceed with his plan. After several months of trying to overcome the red-tape, he begins a long and dangerous journey along with his sons. Along the way, the group picks up female singer Hesho who resides in a village of 1,334 exiled women singers. This adds to the complications of the trip as Hesho did not have authorization to go into Iraq. Despite all these obstacles, Mamo is determined to continue with his journey across the border.

== Critical reception ==
On review aggregator Rotten Tomatoes, the film holds an approval rating of 100% based on 24 reviews, and an average rating of 7.40/10. The website's critical consensus reads, "Bahman Ghobadi's Half Moon is a beautiful and often humorous look into the lives of Kurdish wanderers." On Metacritic, the film has a weighted average score of 72 out of 100, based on 9 critics, indicating "generally favorable reviews".

Jeannette Catsoulis of The New York Times wrote, "Fateful and funny, haunting and magical, Half Moon balances delicately between the harsh realities of its location and the mystical power of Mamo's visions.".

== Soundtrack ==
The film's score was composed by Hossein Alizadeh, that contains traditional Kurdish music. The soundtrack was released on CD on January 18, 2008.

| No. | Title | Length |
|---|---|---|
| 1. | "Moments of Joy and Mirth" (Laylahen) | 2:55 |
| 2. | "The Soul Beckons" (Avaye' Rooh) | 1:34 |
| 3. | "Souls Hymn" (Naghmehe' Rooh) | 1:45 |
| 4. | "Vernal Reunion" (Avahat Vahar) | 2:22 |
| 5. | "Laments In Joy" (Saz O Avaz) | 4:17 |
| 6. | "Compassion Calls" (Avaye' Mehr) | 1:36 |
| 7. | "Ecstasy" (Sama'a) | 2:48 |
| 8. | "Reflections of the Soul" (Avaz'e Daroon) | 3:35 |
| 9. | "Vernal Reception" (Avaz'e Avahat Vahar) | 1:34 |
| 10. | "Vernal Presence" (Avahad Vahar) | 3:36 |
| 11. | "Persuasive Imagination" (Xial) | 1:45 |
| 12. | "The Prophecy" (Darvish) | 3:45 |
| 13. | "Reflection By the Soul II" (Avaz'e Daroon) | 3:37 |
| 14. | "Enrapture" (Vadjd) | 1:29 |
| 15. | "Requiem" (Marsieh) | 4:20 |
| Total length: | | 40:58 |

== Awards ==
1. People's choice Award, International Competition, Istanbul International Film Festival, 2007.
2. Best Cinematography, San Sebastián International Film Festival, 2006.
3. FIPRESCI Prize, San Sebastián International Film Festival, 2006.
4. Golden Seashell, San Sebastián International Film Festival, 2006.
