= Dreams of Violets =

2026 AI-generated docudrama film

- Directed by: Ash Koosha
- Release date: 10 June 2026 (Tribeca Festival)

Dreams of Violets is a 2026 docudrama film entirely generated by artificial intelligence, written, directed and produced by Ash Koosha and co-produced by Pooya Koosha. The film was screened at the Tribeca Film Festival on 10 June 2026. It was later made available to rent and stream on the website of the brothers' AI studio, Fountain 0.

All images and characters in the film were generated using AI-powered video tools and based on journalistic reports, photographs, and eyewitness accounts.

== Plot ==
The film is a fictionalized dramatization of the events surrounding the massacre of Iranian civilians in January 2026. International organizations estimate the death toll at over 7,000, amidst protests and state violence that unfolded during a communications blackout.
