= Kurdish cinema =

Kurdish cinema (Kurdish: سینەمای کوردی, romanized: Sînemay Kurdî) focuses on the Kurdish people and culture. The fate of the Kurds as a people without a state shaped their cinema. Kurdish films often show social grievances, oppression, torture, human rights violations, and life as a stranger. Kurdish cinema has a high significance for the Kurds, as it offers the opportunity to draw attention to their own situation artistically. However, because of state repression, most films are produced in exile. The best example of this is in Turkey, where Kurds were not permitted to speak their native language until 1991, which made the development of their films more difficult.

== History ==
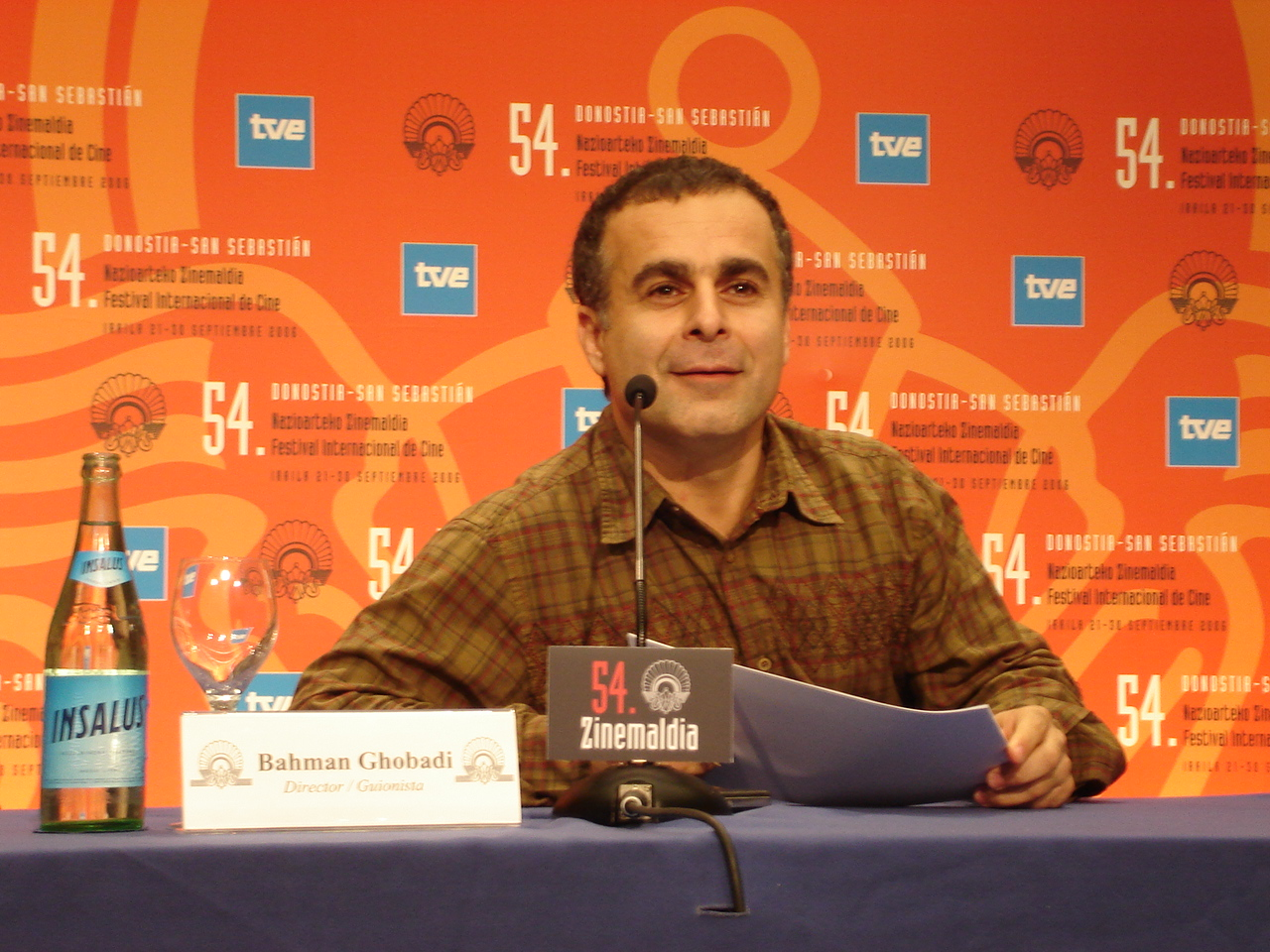
Bahman Ghobadi, Iranian/Kurdish film director at the San Sebastián International Film Festival.

The first documented Kurdish film produced in Soviet Armenia was a 1927 silent film called Zarê, directed by Hamo Beknazarian. Set in 1915, the film depicts a romance between a young Yezidi couple, the shepherd Saydo and the titular Zare. In line with the 1920s ideologies, the film portrays how the Tsar administration used the ignorance of the Kurds to exploit from them with the help of the religious clerics and leaders. Krder-ezidner (Kurds-Yezidis), another black-and-white milestone silent film about Yezidi Kurds in Soviet Armenia was released in 1933. Directed by Amasi Martirosyan, it exhibited the establishment of a Kolkhoz in a Kurdish village.

One of the founding fathers of Kurdish cinema is Yilmaz Güney, who is admired by Kurdish filmmakers for his ability to portray Kurdish cultures in his films, notably Sürü and Yol, despite restrictions levied against him by the Turkish Government. Güney began making films in the 1950s. He won the Palme d`Or at the Cannes Film Festival for his 1982 film Yol – The Road.

In the 1990s, Kurdish cinema culture received support from the newly founded Mesopotamia Cultural Center (MKM). The MKM established a cinema department in which several Kurdish directors made their first movies. In 1995, the Istanbul branch of the MKM organized a cinema workshop.

Yilmaz Güney, Jano Rosebiani, Bahman Qubadi, Shawkat Amin Korky, Mano Khalil, Hisham Zaman, Sahim Omar Kalifa, Bina Qeredaxi and Yüksel Yavuz are among the better known Kurdish directors. Some Kurdish filmmakers like Hiner Saleem live and work outside Kurdistan.

In 1991, a Kurdish film, A Song for Beko by writer-director Nizamettin Ariç, was produced as a German-Armenian production. In 1992, director Ümit Elçi shot Mem û Zîn as a Turkish production. The film Siyabend and Xecê dates back to 1993 and was also produced in Turkey. The number of Kurdish films shot in Iran is growing gradually. Bahman Qubadi, for example, received the Special Mention by the Youth Jury for his film at the Berlinale Turtles Can Fly.

Miraz Bezar's movie Min Dît: The Children of Diyarbakır won awards at the film festivals in San Sebastian, Hamburg, and Ghent. It was the first Kurdish-language movie at a Turkish film festival. It was shown at the Golden Orange Film Festival in Antalya where it won the special jury prize. In the last couple of years in Germany and Switzerland, Kurdish filmmakers in exile who receive public funding from the states they live in, such as NEWA Film Berlin or Frame Film GmbH Bern, for example have created film production companies.

Through the 2000s and 2010s, there was an influx of documentary films filmed throughout Kurdistan. Kurdish filmmakers used documentary films as a tool to educate mainly Western viewers. They have shown their films in film festivals and on social networking sites to bring attention to the past and current events that have, and are, taking place in Kurdistan. Many of these documentaries are shot in cinéma vérité styles, with a small budget and crew. The film Banaz: A Love Story, directed and produced by Deeyah Khan, documents Banaz Mahmod, a 20-year-old Kurdish woman from Mitcham, south London, who was killed in 2006 in a murder orchestrated by her father, uncle, and cousins. It won the 2013 Emmy award for Best International Current Affairs Film.

The Rojava revolution of 2014 saw the creation of the Rojava Film Commune in North East Syria,^{[15]} which went on to produce and distribute multiple films in the ensuing years and whose members founded the Rojava Film Academy and the annual Rojava International Film Festival.

=== Documentary film movement ===
Since the early 2000s, a new generation of Kurdish documentary filmmakers has emerged across all four parts of Kurdistan, These filmmakers explore themes such as exile, identity, memory, and resistance. Many of these works are produced in the diaspora and combine personal narratives with political analysis. Kurdish production companies have been established in France, Germany, and Switzerland, often supported by public broadcasters. The movement is characterized by a transnational approach that highlights Kurdish experiences across Europe, the Middle East, and beyond.

A notable example is the 2025 documentary series Vejîna Kurd – From Genocide to Free Life, produced by teams from all parts of Kurdistan and the diaspora. It documents the history of the Kurdish liberation movement and is the result of eight years of transnational research.

Kurdish filmmakers use documentaries as tools to reach educated Western audiences and raise awareness about historical and current issues in Kurdistan. These films are often shown at festivals and shared via social media, typically produced on small budgets with limited crews.

Festivals such as the Kurdish Film Festival Berlin and the Kurdish Film Days Munich play a key role in promoting this movement.

One prominent figure is Swiss-based director Mano Khalil. His documentary and fictional works address repression, migration, and cultural loss. His film The Beekeeper (2013) portrays the life of a Kurdish refugee in Switzerland and received international acclaim. His 2021 feature Neighbours draws on his childhood in a Kurdish village near the Turkish border.

== Reception and Criticism of Western Documentaries ==
While many Kurdish-made documentaries present nuanced perspectives on exile, identity, and resistance, Western portrayals of Kurdish movements have faced criticism. In particular, the 2024 the European public broadcaster, ARTE, documentary The PKK in Europe – Freedom Fighters or Terrorists? sparked controversy within the Kurdish community. Critics argued that the film echoed the Turkish state's narrative and ignored essential aspects of the Kurdish struggle—such as efforts for autonomy, peace initiatives, and grassroots organizing.

Particular concern arose from the omission of the authors of the book Exiled. Banned. Silenced. How the Kurdish Diaspora in Germany Is Muzzled, who were not consulted despite the thematic overlap. Some featured interviewees later claimed they were approached under misleading premises, which raised questions about the film’s editorial ethics.

Doubts were also expressed about the authenticity of two anonymous sources presented as former Kurdistan Workers' Party (PKK) members. Observers noted the use of the Turkish pronunciation “PeKaKa,” which is not typical in Kurdish and viewed as a political signal in Turkey. This led to speculation that the speakers were actors rather than genuine former activists.

Further critique was directed at the director, Candan Six-Sasmaz, whose social media profile reportedly included nationalist symbols such as an Atatürk portrait. She also made controversial public comments asserting that the PKK "abducts children" and "deals in drugs and extortion," contradicting ARTE’s editorial standards of neutrality before deleting the post.

The documentaries reception has sparked broader discussions on the representation of Kurdish topics in public broadcasting, especially on networks like ARTE or ARD. Critics argue that state-funded broadcasters often adopt securitized narratives and marginalize Kurdish perspectives. Anonymity, selective sourcing, and lack of historical context are frequently cited concerns.

This discourse is also reflected in the 2023 book Exiled. Banned. Silenced. by Alexander Glasner-Hummel, Monika Morres, and Kerem Schamberger. The authors examine how media narratives contribute to the criminalization of Kurdish organizations and reveal structural biases in German media coverage. They call for pluralistic, human rights-oriented journalism.

The debate surrounding the ARTE documentary is also seen as symptomatic of a broader issue: the lack of media representation of Kurdish perspectives in Germany and the uncritical reproduction of state narratives by public broadcasters.

== Films ==
=== List of notable films ===
- 1926: Zare
- 1978: The Herd (Sürü)
- 1982: Yol
- 1983: The Wall
- 1996: Bêrîvan (A Song Against the Rain) (Miraz Bezar)
- 1998: April Children
- 1999: Journey to the Sun
- 1999: 'Bad ma ra khahad bord (The Wind Will Carry Us)
- 1999: Ax (The Land)
- 2000: A Time for Drunken Horses
- 2000: Blackboards
- 2002: Jiyan
- 2002: Marooned in Iraq
- 2004: Turtles Can Fly
- 2004: Vodka Lemon
- 2005: Kilomètre Zéro
- 2006: David & Layla
- 2006: Beritan
- 2006: Half Moon
- 2006: Û nergiz biskivîn (Narcissus Blossom)
- 2007: Dol – Valley of Drums
- 2007: David and Layla
- 2007: Crossing the Dust
- 2008: Sores and Sîrîn
- 2008: My Marlon and Brando (Gitmek)
- 2009: Min Dît: The Children of Diyarbakır
- 2009: Bahoz (The Storm)
- 2011: The Shadow of a Bullet
- 2011: Mes – Run!
- 2012: Bekas
- 2012: Rhino Season
- 2013: Chaplin of the Mountains
- 2013: Were Dengê Min (Follow My Voice)
- 2013: Jîn
- 2013: My Sweet Pepper Land
- 2014: Klama Dayîka Min (My Mother's Song)
- 2014: Memories on Stone
- 2014: One Candle, Two Candles
- 2015: I Want to Live
- 2016: The Swallow
- 2016: Where Is Kurdistan?
- 2016: Reseba: The Dark Wind
- 2016: House Without Roof
- 2017: Zer – Whose Love
- 2017: Zagros
- 2019: Toutes les vies de Kojin
- 2019: The End will be Spectacular
- 2020: Neighbours
- 2021: Stille Post
- 2021: Brother’s Keeper (Okul Tıraşı)
- 2021: The Exam
- 2022: My Small Land
- 2022: Kobanê
- 2024: Demo Ke Pelê Gozan Benî Zer (When the Walnut Leaves Turn Yellow)

=== List of notable documentaries ===
- 2006: Notes from a Kurdish Rebel (Stefano Savona)
- 2008: Close-up Kurdistan (Yüksel Yavuz)
- 2011: The Guerilla Son (Zanyar Adami, David Herdies)
- 2012: Banaz: A Love Story (Deeyah Khan)
- 2013: 1,001 Apples (Taha Karimi)
- 2013: Der Imker (Mano Khalil)
- 2013: The Silent Revolution (David Meseguer, Oriol Gracià)
- 2013: Hêvî (Hope) (Yüksel Yavuz)
- 2013: The Beekeeper (Der Imker) (Mano Khalil)
- 2015: Bakur (North) (Çayan Demirel, Ertugrul Mavioglu)
- 2015: Her War: Women vs. ISIS (Anastasia Trofimova)
- 2015: Life on the Border
- 2015: Berçem – The Other Side of the Water
- 2015: Frontline Fighting: Battling ISIS
- 2015: Victims of ISIS (Anastasia Trofimova)
- 2015: Letter to the King (Hisham Zaman)
- 2016: Dil Leyla (Asli Özarslan)
- 2016: The Freedom Struggle of Kurdish Women (Mylène Sauloy)
- 2016: Roza – The Country Of Two Rivers (Kudbettin Cebe)
- 2016: Radio Kobanî (Reber Dosky)
- 2016: Gulîstan, Land of Roses (Zaynê Akyol)
- 2016: The Sniper of Kobani (Reber Dosky)
- 2016: Our War (Bruno Chiaravalloti, Claudio Jampaglia, Benedetta Argentieri)
- 2016: My Paradise (Ekrem Heydo)
- 2017: AMED – Memory of a City (Yüksel Yavuz)
- 2017: Filles du Feu (Stéphane Breton)
- 2017: Fear Us Women (David Darg)
- 2017: Resistance Is Life (Apo W. Bazidi)
- 2017: Who Is Afraid of Ideology? Part 1 (Marwa Arsanios)
- 2017: Binxet – Under the Border (Luigi D’Alife)
- 2017: No Place for Tears (Reyan Tuvi)
- 2017: Jiyan’s Story (A. Halûk Ünal)
- 2017: Accidental Anarchist (Clara Glynn, John Archer)
- 2017: The Road to Raqqa (Anastasia Trofimova)
- 2018: The Communes of Rojava: A Model in Societal Self-Direction (Neighbor Democracy)
- 2018: Commander Arian (Alba Sotorra)
- 2018: I Am The Revolution (Benedetta Argentieri)
- 2019: Sidik and the Panther (Reber Dosky)
- 2019: Rojava – The Dream of the Kurds (Michael Enger)
- 2019: Voices of Bakur (Two Rivers and a Valley collective)
- 2019: Anna: The Woman Who Went to Fight ISIS (Marina Parker)
- 2019: Who Is Afraid of Ideology? Part 2 (Marwa Arsanios)
- 2019: International Volunteers of the Rojava Revolution (Lorenzo Serna)
- 2020: Paris - Die Kurdinnen und ihr Killer: Der Kampf von PKK und Türkei mitten in Europa (Paris: The Kurdish Women and Their Killer) (Ahmet Şenyurt)
- 2021: Heval (Adam R. Wood)
- 2021: Kurdbûn – To Be Kurdish (Fariborz Kamkari)
- 2021: The Other Side of the River (Antonia Kilian)
- 2022: Angels of Sinjar (Hanna Polak)
- 2022: The Rain Bride (Hemin Latif)
- 2023: Iraq: Kurds Against the Mullahs (Jean-Jacques Cunnac, Laurent Perpigna Iban)
- 2025: Vejîna Kurd – From Genocide to Free Life (Gulistan Tara Documentary Commune)

== Directors ==
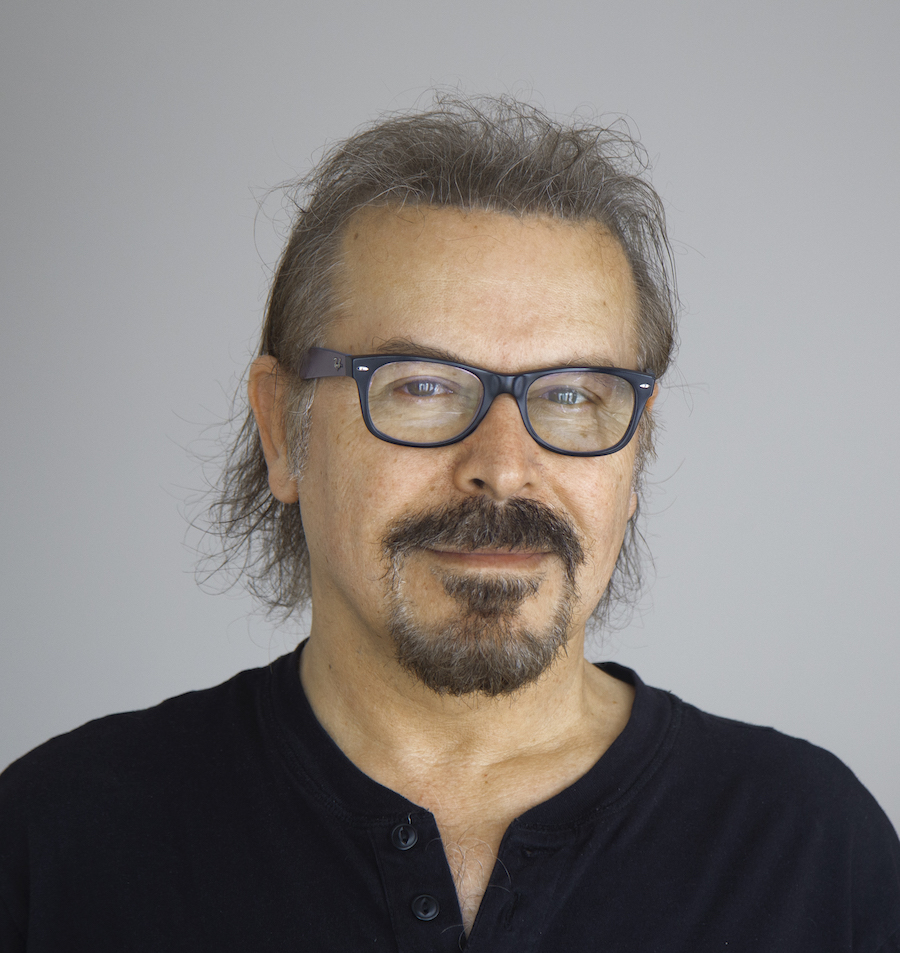
Jano Rosebiani

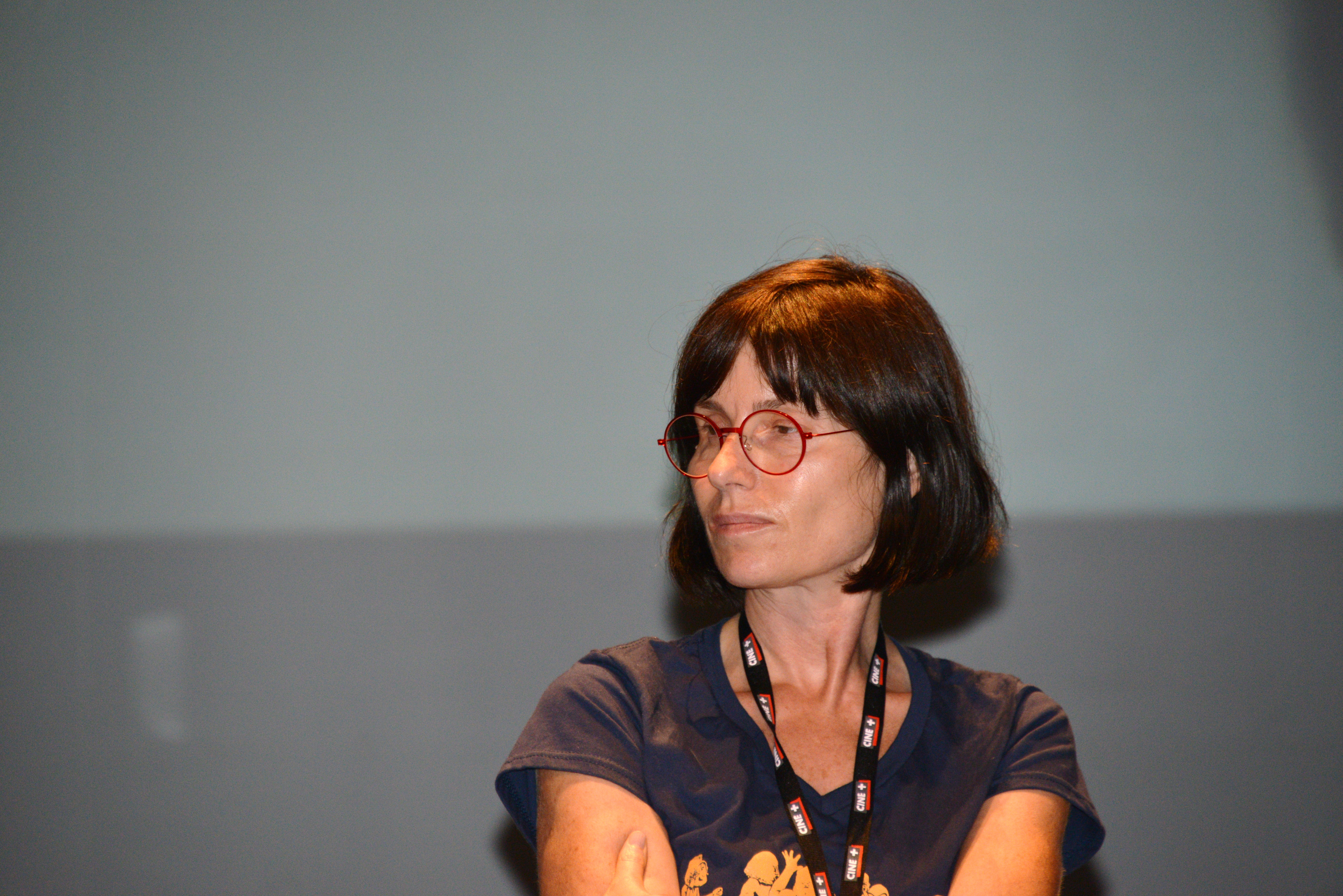
Yeşim Ustaoğlu

- Züli Aladağ
- Nizamettin Ariç
- Bahman Ghobadi
- Yılmaz Güney
- Sahim Omar Kalifa
- Mano Khalil
- Shawkat Amin Korki
- Kazim Öz
- Ayşe Polat
- Jano Rosebiani
- Nuray Şahin
- Hiner Saleem
- Yeşim Ustaoğlu
- Yüksel Yavuz
- Yusuf Yeşilöz
- Hisham Zaman
- Karzan Kader
- Karzan Kardozi
- Miraz Bezar
- Nazmi Kırık
- Ferit Karahan
- Zaynê Akyol
- Reber Dosky
- Fariborz Kamkari

== See also ==
- Kurds
- Kurdistan
