= Rhino Season =

- فصل کرگدن (Persian)
- Directed by: Bahman Ghobadi
- Written by: Bahman Ghobadi
- Produced by: Bahman Ghobadi; Menderes Demir (executive producer)
- Starring: Behrouz Vossoughi; Monica Bellucci; Yılmaz Erdoğan; Caner Cindoruk; Beren Saat; Belçim Bilgin; Arash Labaf; Ali Pourtash
- Narrated by: Bayan Nassir
- Cinematography: Touraj Aslani
- Edited by: Valerie Loiseleux
- Music by: Keyhan Kalhor
- Release dates: September 12, 2012 (Toronto International Film Festival); September 26, 2012 (San Sebastián International Film Festival)
- Running time: 90 minutes
- Countries: Iran; Kurdistan; Turkey; Iran
- Languages: Persian; Turkish
- Box office: $381,529

Rhino Season (Persian: فصل کرگدن, Fasl-e Kargadan) is a 2012 Iraqi-Kurdistan-Turkish docufiction film directed by Bahman Ghobadi and presented by Martin Scorsese. Starring Behrouz Vossoughi, Monica Bellucci, Yılmaz Erdoğan, Caner Cindoruk, and Arash Labaf. The movie includes poems read and written by Bayan Nassir.

The film is based on Iranian Kurdish poet and author Sedigh Kamangar, who spent 27 years imprisoned in Iran while his family was told that he was dead. For many years Sadegh's family cried over a fake grave staged by the Iranian government.

== Cast ==
- Behrouz Vossoughi as Sahel
- Monica Bellucci as Mina
- Yilmaz Erdogan as Akbar Rezai
- Arash Labaf as Son
- Beren Saat as Daughter
- Caner Cindoruk as Young Sahel
- Belçim Bilgin as Female Pimp

== Reception ==
On Metacritic, the film has a weighted average score of 66 out of 100, based on 6 critics, indicating "generally favorable reviews".

John DeFoe of The Hollywood Reporter wrote, "Haunting feature that crafts fiction from the inspiration of real-life Kurdish-Iranian poet Sadegh Kamangar. Co-star Monica Bellucci may attract much of the attention Stateside, but the film's ravishing aesthetic and multiple points of political interest will make it fascinating to many cineastes".

== Awards and nominations ==
Award	Category	Nominee	Result
Asia Pacific Screen Awards	Achievement in Cinematography	Turaj Aslani	Won
Asian Film Awards	Best Cinematographer	Turaj Aslani	Won
Asian Film Awards	Best Editor	Valérie Loiseleux	Nominated
Asian Film Awards	Best Production Designer	Bahman Ghobadi	Won
Asian Film Awards	Best Production Designer	Ali Daryayi	
Camerimage	Bronze Frog	Turaj Aslani	Won
Camerimage	Golden Frog	Turaj Aslani	Nominated
Chicago International Film Festival	Gold Hugo for Best International Feature	Bahman Ghobadi	Nominated
Cinema Bloggers Awards, Portugal	Best Asian Film	Bahman Ghobadi, Iran	Nominated
San Sebastián International Film Festival	Prize of the Jury for Best Cinematography	Turaj Aslani	Won
San Sebastián International Film Festival	Golden Seashell	Bahman Ghobadi	Nominated
Tallinn Black Nights Film Festival	Grand Prize	Bahman Ghobadi	Nominated
