= The Yellow Dogs =

Iranian-American rock band

- Origin: Tehran, Iran
- Genres: Indie rock, post-punk revival
- Years active: 2006–2013
- Members: Koori Mirzeai; Siavash "Obash" Karampour
- Past members: Soroush Farazmand; Arash Farazmand
- Website: yellowdogsband.bandcamp.com

The Yellow Dogs were an Iranian-American rock band, formed in 2006. The band was formed in Tehran, and is now based in Brooklyn, New York.

Two of the band's founding members were brothers, Soroush (guitarist) and Arash (drummer) Farazmand; they were shot dead in Brooklyn on November 11, 2013, along with an associate Ali Eskandarian. The two surviving band members, Siavash "Obash" Karampour (vocalist) and Kourosh "Koory" Mirzaei (bass), who were not present when the shooting occurred.

== Biography ==
The Yellow Dogs are from Tehran, Iran. They sang in English and played Western instruments, citing Joy Division, Talking Heads as an influence. Their music was not approved by Iran's Ministry of Culture and Islamic Guidance, and was therefore illegal. They performed in Bahman Ghobadi's Cannes Un Certain Regard award-winning film, No One Knows About Persian Cats and were interviewed by Reza Sayah for CNN before leaving Iran.

The Yellow Dogs played their first 'aboveground' (legal) concert at the Peyote club in Istanbul in January 2010. Two days later, they flew to New York City. Their second 'aboveground' concert was at the Cameo Gallery, in Brooklyn, New York. They later played Santos Party House and the Delancey in New York, and they played the Wave in Austin, Texas as part of the SXSW festival. They played the 92nd St. Y Tribeca in Manhattan at an afterparty for the U.S. opening of No One Knows About Persian Cats. Another band, also from Tehran, was also on the bill for this concert, Hypernova. Koory and Looloosh were part of the original line-up of Hypernova. But they did not leave Iran when other Hypernova members departed for the United States.

On April 13, 2010 Milan Records released the No One Knows About Persian Cats motion picture soundtrack. The Yellow Dogs track "New Century" is included in the motion picture soundtrack, and bassist Koory appears on the CD cover and on the movie poster. IFC Films released the movie on demand on April 14, 2010, and in theaters two days later.

=== November 2013 shooting ===
On November 11, 2013, a shooting took place in Brooklyn that involved Yellow Dogs band members. Guitarist Soroush Farazmand (age 27); drummer Arash Farazmand (age 28); along with Ali Eskandarian (age 35), a musician friend who was not part of the band; were all shot dead by disgruntled musician, Ali Akbar Mohammed Rafie (also known as Raefe Akhbar, age 29), who was armed with a Century Arms C308 Sporter. Another man present at the crime scene, Sasan Sadeghpourosko (age 25), survived, suffering only wounds to his arm. Rafie committed suicide.

Originally, media reports described Akbar as a former band member who had been thrown out of the band three days before. In later reports, however, it was stated that he had never been an official member of the Yellow Dogs, but had hung out with Yellow Dogs since being expelled in 2012 from a different Iranian emigre rock band, Free Keys.

== Discography ==
EPs

- In the Kennel EP (2011)
- Upper Class Complexity (2012)

Singles

- "Gastronomic Meal" (2011)

Soundtrack

- "New Century" (No One Knows About Persian Cats soundtrack, 2009)
