= Kolber =

Kolber may refer to:

- Kolber (company), Swiss watchmaking company
- Leo Kolber (1929–2020), Canadian businessman
- Suzy Kolber (born 1964), American sportscaster
- Kolbar workers in Kurdistan
