= Organisation of Sharia in Kurdistan =

Salafi jihadist militant group in Iraq

Organization of Sharia in Kurdistan
- ڕێکخراوی شەریعت لە کوردستان
- Flag of OSK
- Leader: Rabar Al Kurdi
- Dates active: In Iraq: 2022 – present
- Headquarters: Hawraman Mountains
- Active regions: Iraqi Kurdistan
- Ideology: Kurdish-Islamic nationalism; Sunni Islamism; Qutbism; Sunni Jihadism
- Size: Estimated 40+ Fighters

The Organization of Sharia in Kurdistan (OSK) (Kurdish: ڕێکخراوی شەریعت لە کوردستان) is an Islamic organization founded in 2022 to promote Sharia law and Islamic principles within the Kurdish regions of Iraq. Operating primarily in secrecy, OSK seeks to address political, social, and religious issues affecting the Kurdish population while emphasizing the importance of Islamic governance. The group operates in the mountainous regions of Iraqi Kurdistan, primarily around Halabja and the Hawraman mountains.

== Objectives ==
OSK aims to provide a platform for the implementation of Islamic law in the Kurdish territories, advocating for religious education, community welfare, and the establishment of Sharia-compliant social systems. The organization focuses on fostering unity among Kurds under the banner of Islamic values.

== Membership ==
Rabar Al Kurdi, a well-known figure in Halabja among scholars and mullahs, leads OSK. The group's popularity is not widespread, as it mostly operates in secrecy in the region. However, some villagers have shown support for their cause due to discontent with the Kurdistan Regional Government (KRG). Recruitment through mosques has been common, often utilizing figures such as Mullah Krekar and Mullah Ismail Susay to gather supporters and taking advantage of the discontent towards the KRG.

== Activities ==
OSK has set up training camps in the mountain ranges near Halabja, where they train their militants in various forms of combat and ideological education. The organization conducts community outreach programs to promote its interpretation of Islam and build support among local populations. They engage in clandestine operations aimed at advancing their objectives, including intelligence gathering and potential acts of violence against perceived adversaries.

On May 12, 2024, some parts of the group clashed with Iranian border security forces, resulting in the deaths of two Iranians, in an attempt to increase popularity by assisting Kolbars. On September 5, 2024, a gunfight erupted between a suspected cell of the organization and Asayish, leading to the death of the alleged cell member. It is believed that the group's primary funding sources are businesses disguised as normal enterprises that pay OSK for protection or operational support.
