= François Chalais Prize =

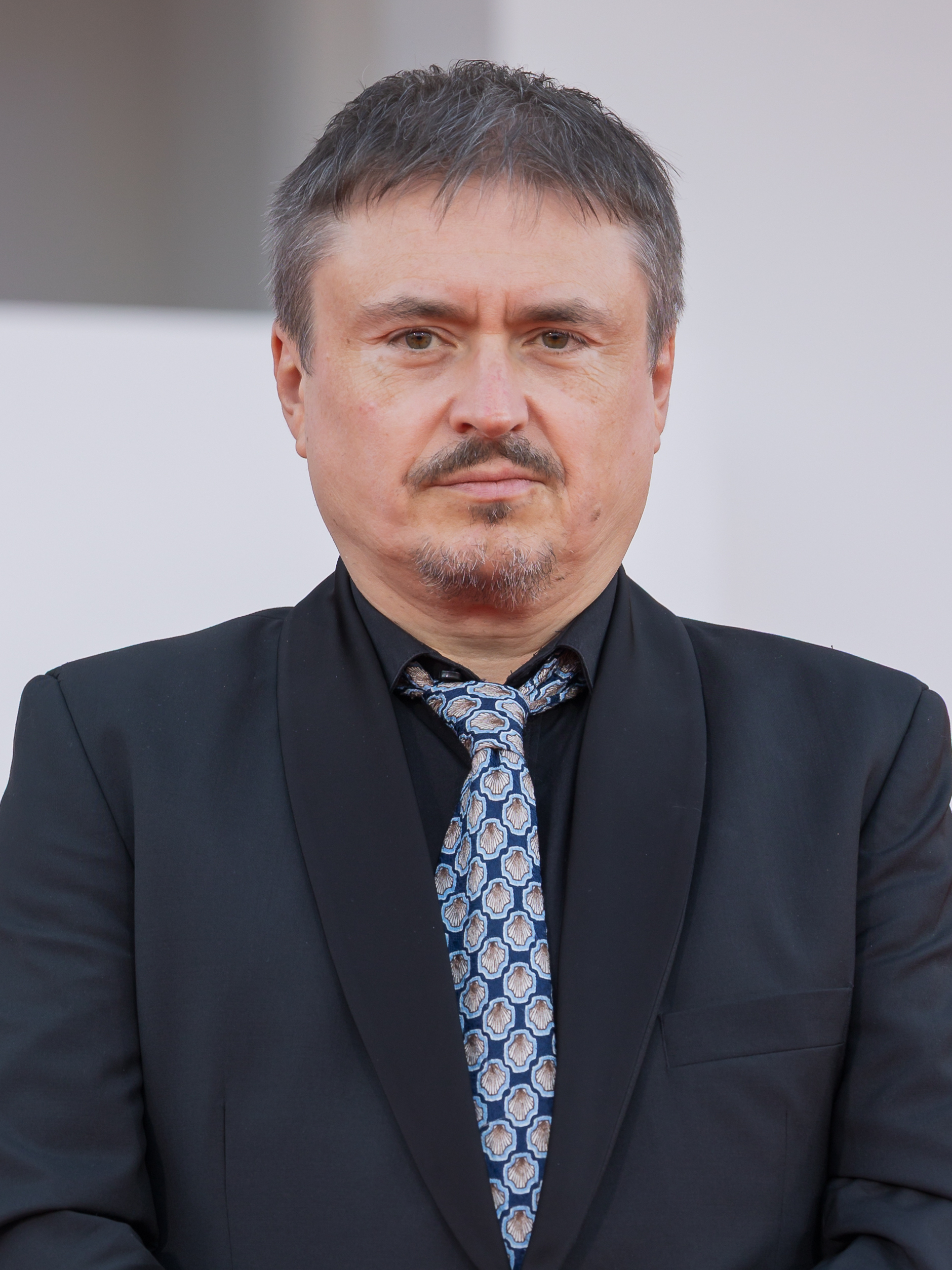
- 2026 recipient: Cristian Mungiu
- Native name: Prix François Chalais
- Awarded for: A film dedicated to the values of journalism
- Country: France
- First award: 1997
- Currently held by: Cristian Mungiu for Fjord (2026)

The François Chalais Prize (French: Prix François Chalais) is awarded on the eve of the official competition awards ceremony and rewards films dedicated to the values of journalism.

Its most recent winner was the drama film Fjord by Cristian Mungiu at the 2026 Cannes Film Festival.

== History ==
The prize is awarded at two main events, the Cannes Film Festival (since 1997) and the Young Reporters' Awards (since 1999). It has also offered awards for the Film Festival of Sarlat (2006–2009), and for the Scénario Honfleur (2006–2009).

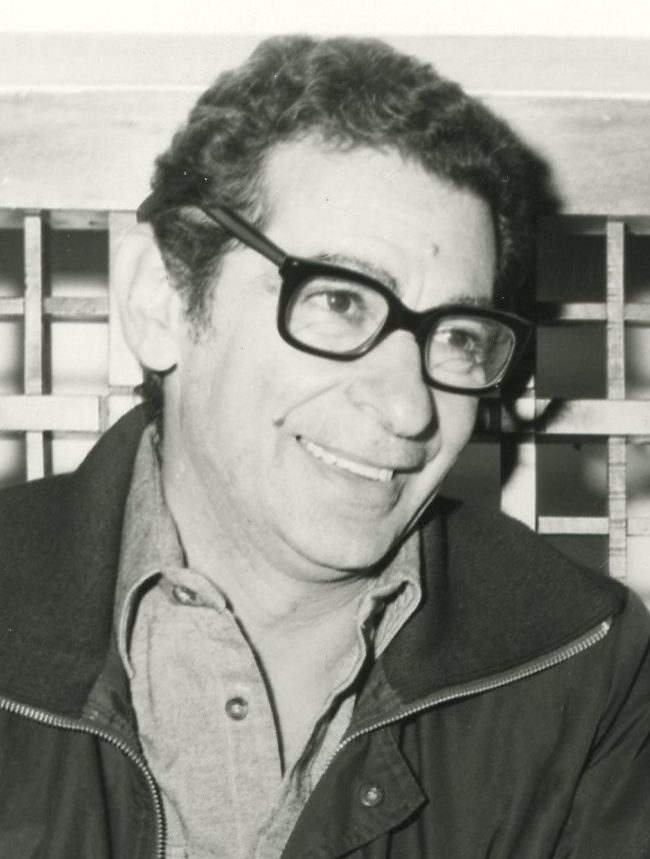
Youssef Chahine won for The Other (1999)

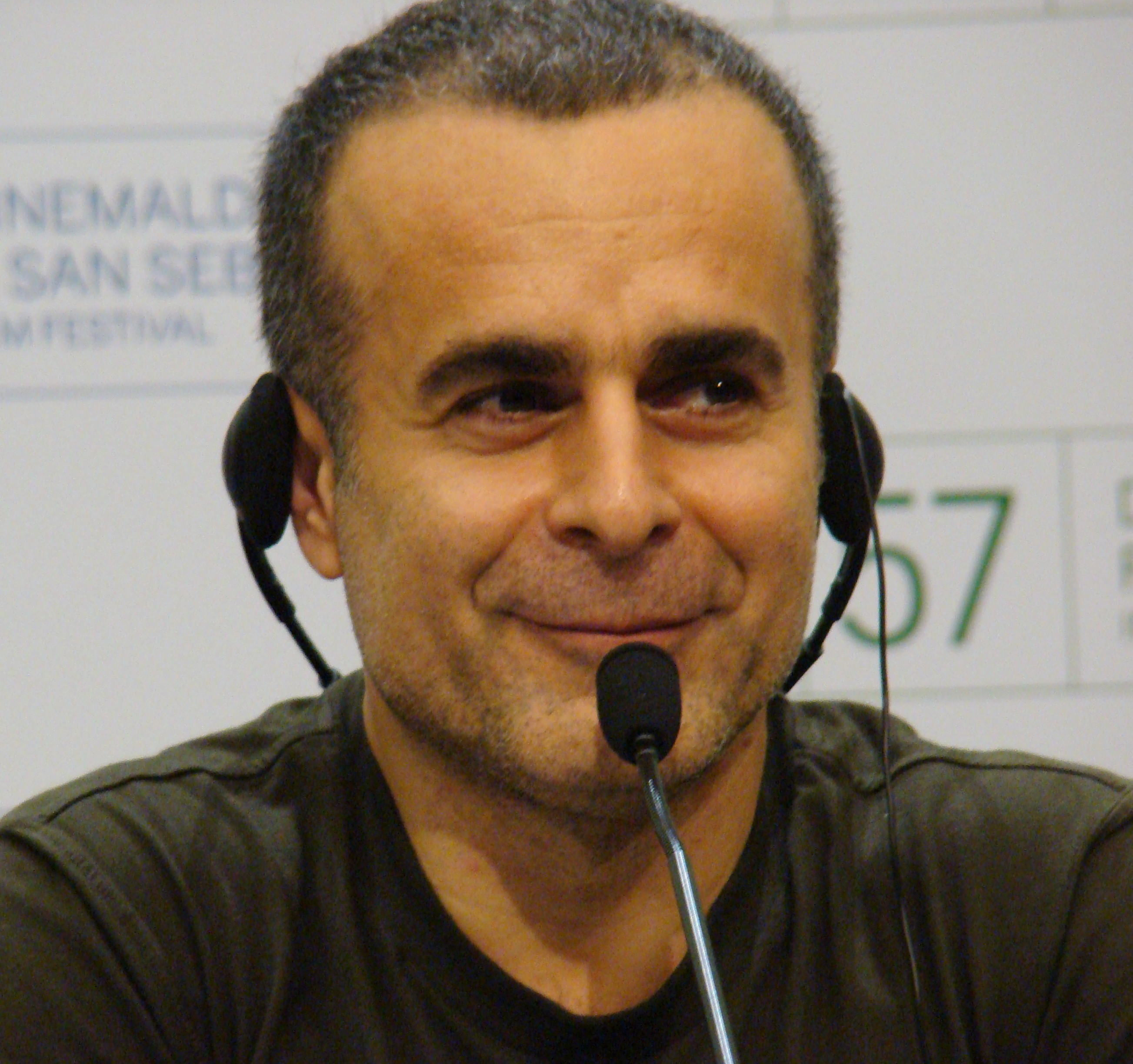
Bahman Ghobadi won twice for Marooned in Iraq (2002) and No One Knows About Persian Cats (2009)

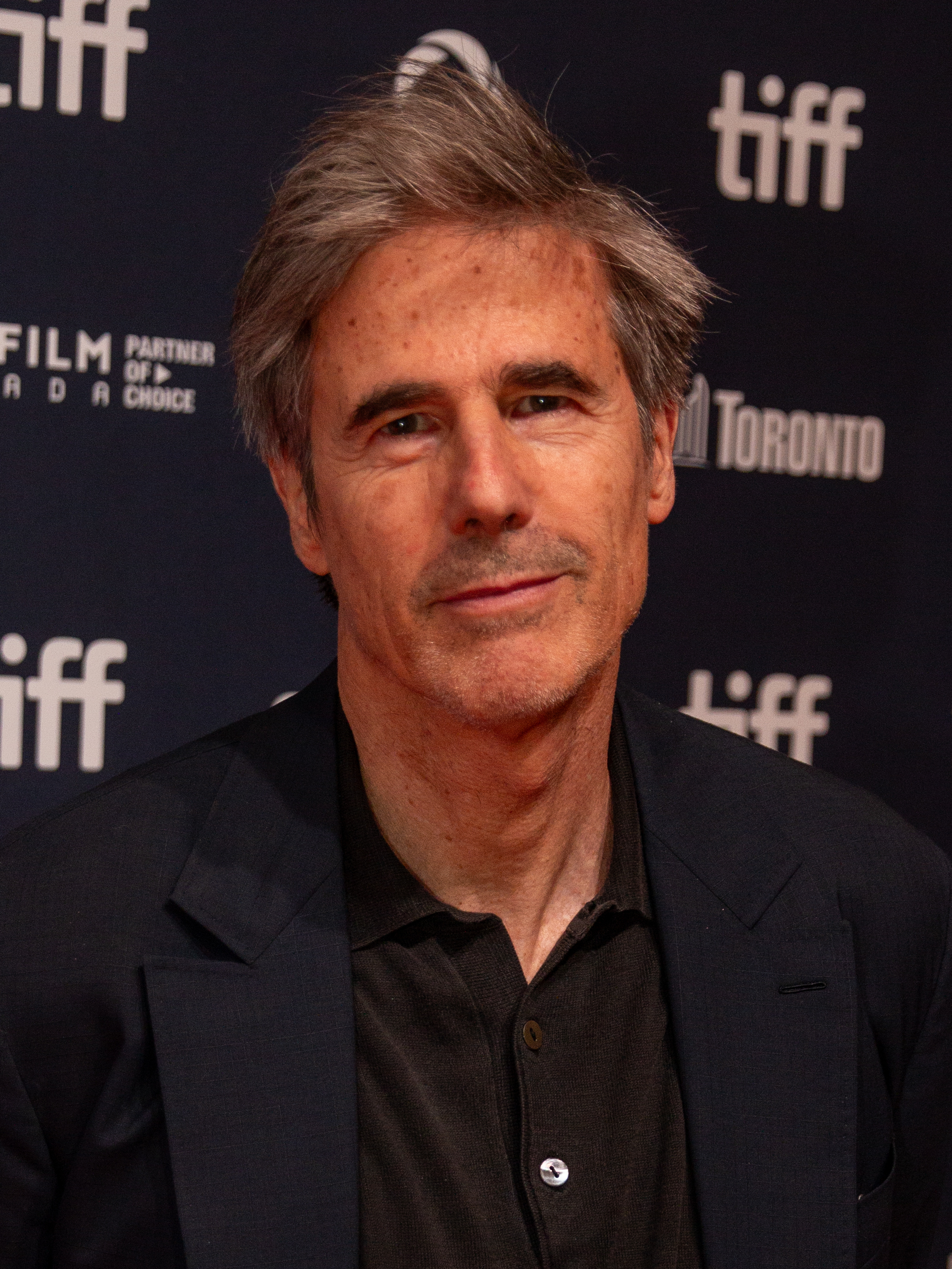
Walter Salles won for The Motorcycle Diaries (2004)

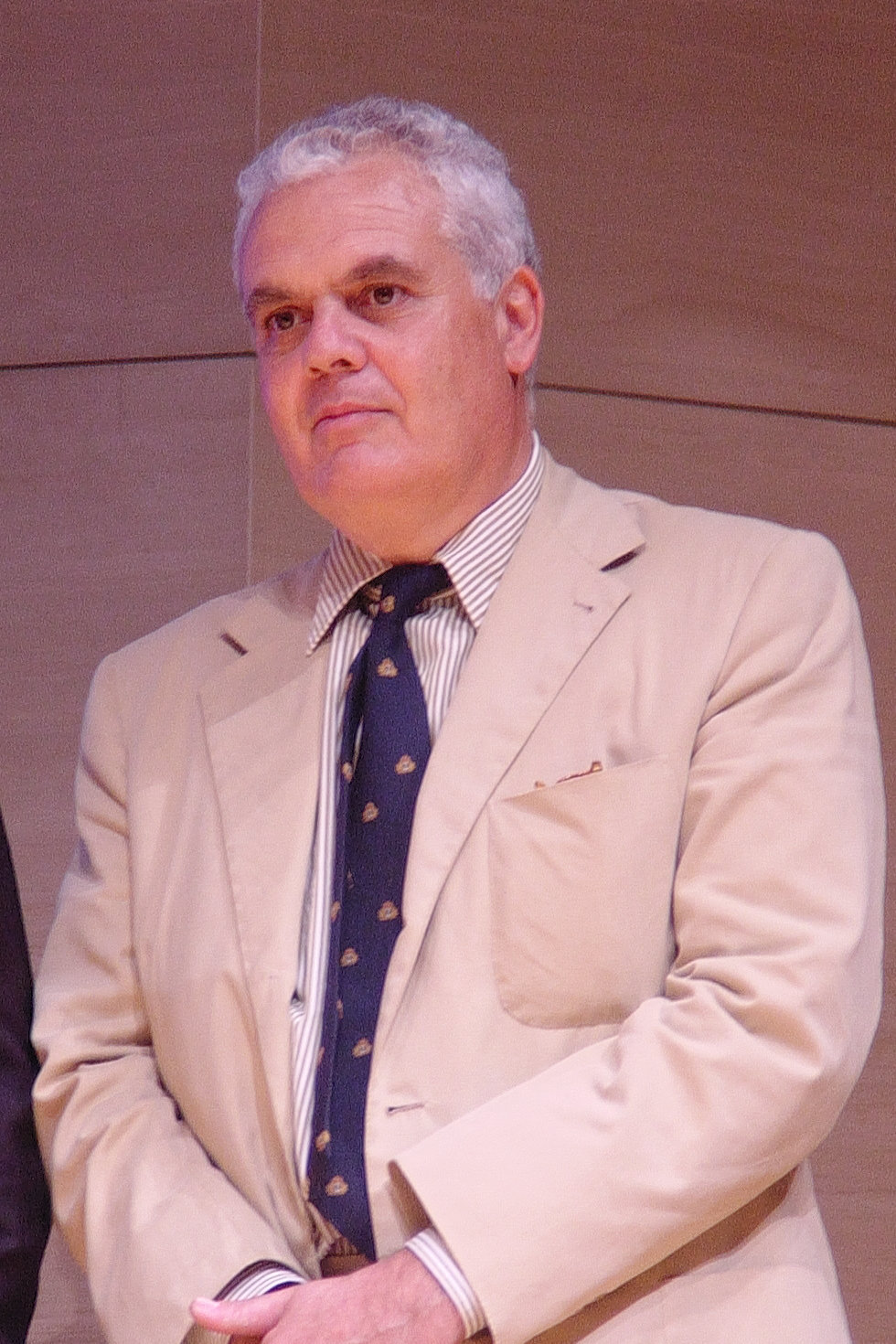
Marco Tullio Giordana won twice for Once You're Born You Can No Longer Hide (2005) and Wild Blood (2008)

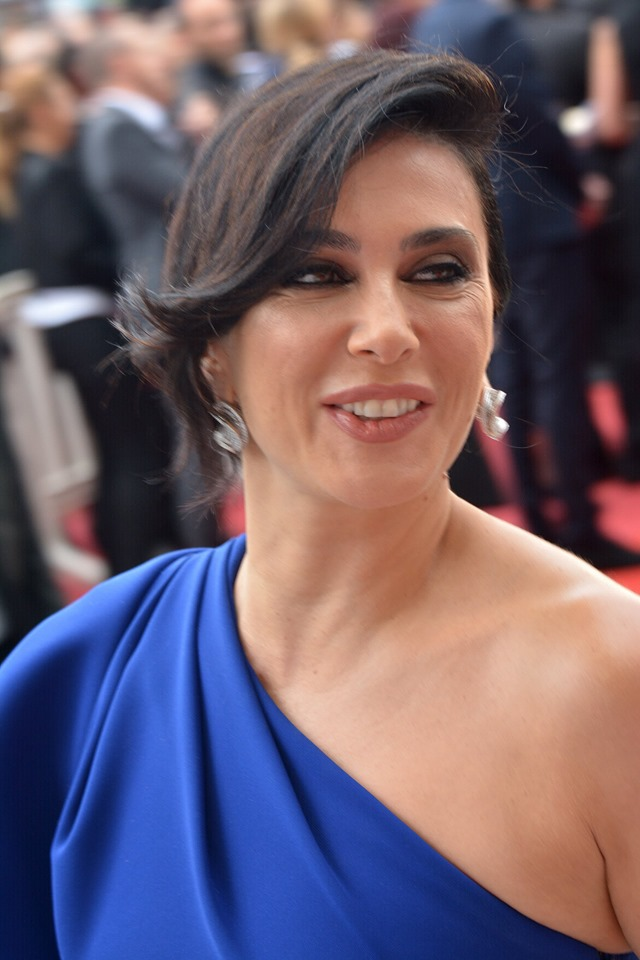
Nadine Labaki won for Where Do We Go Now? (2011)

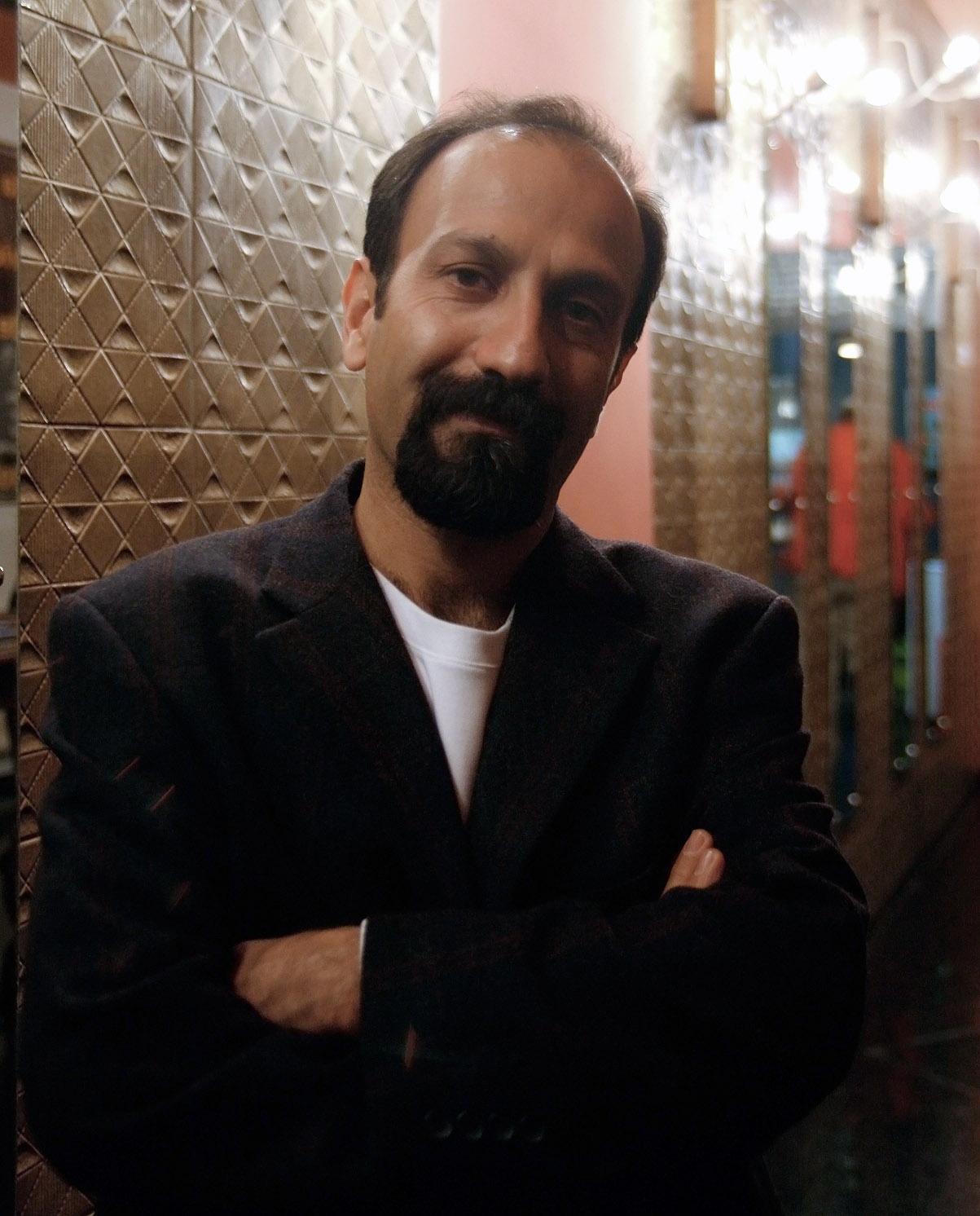
Asghar Farhadi won for A Hero (2021)

The François Chalais Prize was created in 1996 by his wife Mei-Chen Chalais to pay tribute to the work of the great reporter and film-maker who covered nearly fifty editions of the Festival.

Its first winner was the Bosnian War drama film The Perfect Circle by Ademir Kenović at the 1997 Cannes Film Festival.

== Winners ==
=== 1990s ===
Year	English title	Original title	Director(s)	Production country
1997	The Perfect Circle	Savršeni krug	Ademir Kenović	Bosnia and Herzegovina
1998	West Beirut	بيروت الغربية	Ziad Doueiri	Lebanon
1999	The Other	الآخر	Youssef Chahine	Egypt, France

=== 2000s ===
Year	English title	Original title	Director(s)	Production country
2000	Kippur	כיפור	Amos Gitai	Israel
2001	Made in the USA		Sólveig Anspach	Belgium, France
2002	Marooned in Iraq	گم‌گشته‌ای در عراق	Bahman Ghobadi	Iran
2003	S-21: The Khmer Rouge Killing Machine	S-21, la machine de mort Khmère rouge	Rithy Panh	Cambodia, France
2004	The Motorcycle Diaries	Diarios de motocicleta	Walter Salles	Argentina, Brazil, United States, Chile, Peru, United Kingdom, Germany, France
2005	Once You're Born You Can No Longer Hide	Quando sei nato non puoi più nasconderti	Marco Tullio Giordana	Italy, France, United Kingdom
2006	Babel		Alejandro González Iñárritu	United States, Mexico, Morocco, France
2007	A Mighty Heart		Michael Winterbottom	United States
2008	Wild Blood	Sanguepazzo	Marco Tullio Giordana	Italy
2009	No One Knows About Persian Cats	کسی از گربه های ایرانی خبر نداره	Bahman Ghobadi	Iran

=== 2010s ===
Year	English title	Original title	Director(s)	Production country
2010	Life, Above All		Oliver Schmitz	South Africa
2011	Where Do We Go Now?	وهلأ لوين؟	Nadine Labaki	Lebanon, France, Egypt, Italy
2012	Horses of God	يا خيل الله	Nabil Ayouch	Morocco, Belgium
2013	Grand Central		Rebecca Zlotowski	France, Austria
2014	Timbuktu		Abderrahmane Sissako	Mauritania, France
2015	Son of Saul	Saul fia	László Nemes	Hungary
2016	The Student	Ученик	Kirill Serebrennikov	Russia
2017	BPM (Beats per Minute)	120 battements par minute	Robin Campillo	France
2018	Yomeddine	يوم الدين	Abu Bakr Shawky	Egypt
2019	A Hidden Life		Terrence Malick	Germany, United States

=== 2020s ===
Year	English title	Original title	Director(s)	Production country
2021	A Hero	قهرمان	Asghar Farhadi	Iran, France
2022	Boy from Heaven	صبي من الجنة	Tarik Saleh	Sweden, France, Finland
2023	Four Daughters	بنات ألفة	Kaouther Ben Hania	Tunisia, France, Germany, Saudi Arabia
2024	The Seed of the Sacred Fig	دانه‌ی انجیر معابد	Mohammad Rasoulof	Iran, Germany, France
2025	Two Prosecutors	Zwei Staatsanwälte	Sergei Loznitsa	Latvia, France, Germany, Netherlands, Romania, Lithuania
2026	Fjord		Cristian Mungiu	Romania, Norway, Denmark, France, Sweden
