= Rana Farhan =

رعنا فرحان Rana Farhan
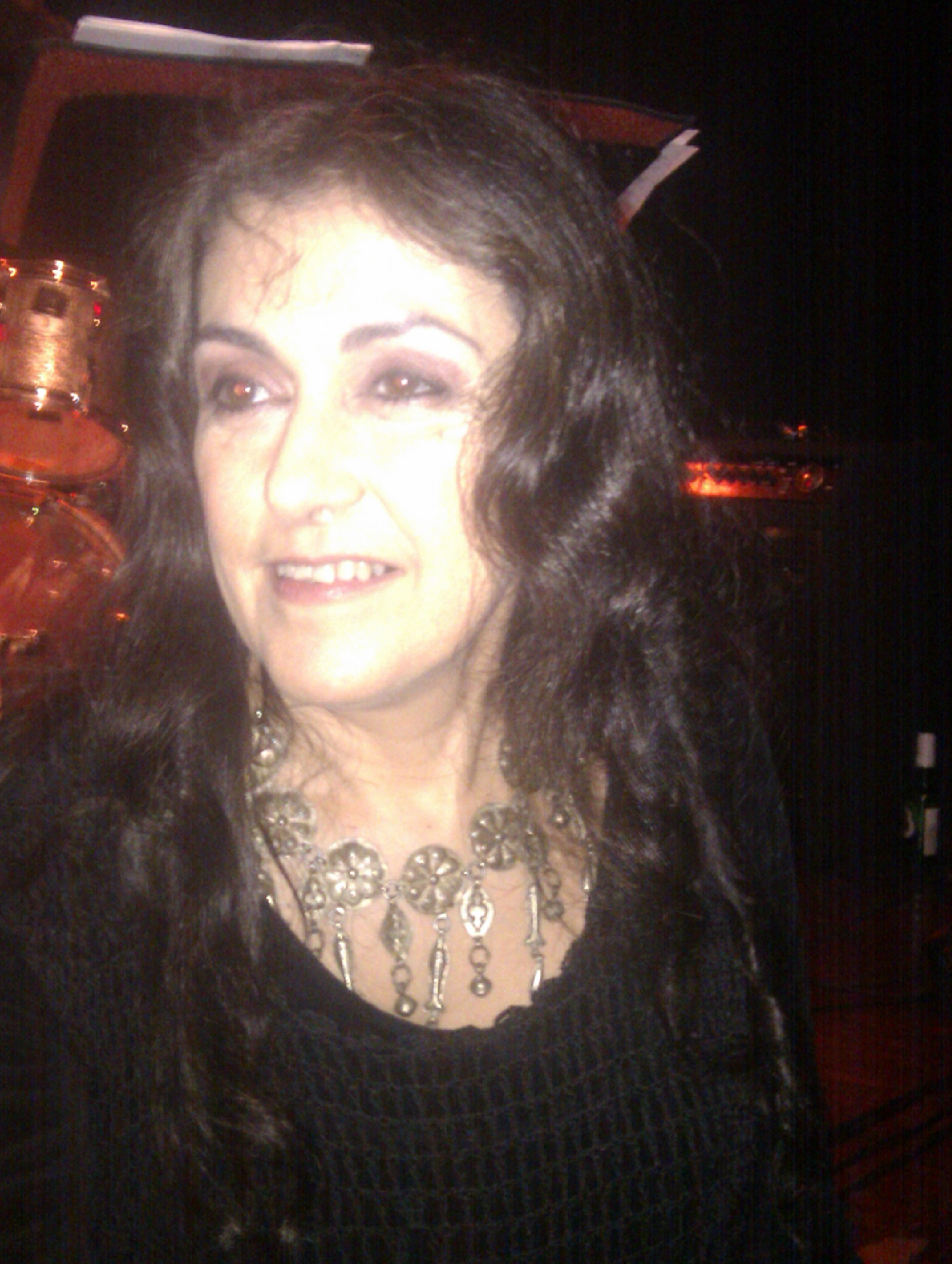
- Rana Farhan on Poletik - August 2014

Background information
- Origin: Iran
- Genres: Blues, jazz, experimental
- Occupation: Singer
- Years active: 2005–present
- Website: ranafarhanmusic.com

Rana Farhan (Persian: رعنا فرحان) is an Iranian musician and singer of jazz and blues. After graduating from Tehran University, she left Iran in 1989, and has been living in New York since then.

== Recording albums ==
In 2005 she teamed with guitarist/producer Steven Toub for her first full-length CD, "The Blues Are Brewin'", a collection of American jazz and blues standards. Farhan's second release, "I Return", combined classical Persian poetry with contemporary blues and jazz music and established a model to the jazz fusion project that she continues to incorporate in her work. After positive reception from an independently-circulating single called "Rumi's Prayer", she collaborated with Taub once again to create an album of songs that featured the poetry of major poets such as Rumi and Hafez. She received critical acclaim from one track in particular off that album, "Drunk with Love", which has been used in a variety of places, from being sung by contestants on the Iranian version of American Idol to Bahman Ghobadi's 2009 film No One Knows About Persian Cats (Kasi az Gorbehaye Irani Khabar Nadareh). Her 2011 album, "Moon and Stone," is an expressive tribute to soul music. She held a major album release party at New York's DROM for the 2014 recording "Attar Boulevard".

== Visual art ==
Farhan also does gilding and paints miniatures, both using very traditional forms and using these techniques to create abstract compositions.

== Appearances ==
Rana has been featured on BBC Persian, Manoto, Voice of America, Suzi Khatami's "Live From Hollywood" KIRN 670 AM Los Angeles, dw-world.de German radio with Shahram Ahadi, "Taraneyeh Nasorudeh" with Farid Vahabi RFI Radio France International, Voice of America radio Farda, Homa Sarshar's "Khaaneh-ye doost" 670AM Los Angeles, the Kook entertainment show with Behzad Bolour for BBC Persia, Sholeh Sadr sbs radio from Melbourne Australia, "Saba: Wind of Love" 90.1 FM KKFI Kansas City Radio, "The Upper Room with Joe Kelly" WVOF 88.5 FM in Fairfield CT, "Persian Hour" with Shahrokh Nikfar KYRS 92.3 FM in Spokane Washington, and Buenos Aires' "Goodtime Blues Show" in Argentina. She has also appeared on Bebin TV in Los Angeles with Melissa Shoshahi and Voice of America/Persian TV's Shabahang.

== Discography ==
- 2007 : I Return (Baz Amadam)
- 2009 : Your Wish (Arezoo-Ye To)
- 2011 : Moon and Stone (Mah-o Sang)
- 2014 : Attar Boulevard
- 2018 : Talkin' About Love
- 2025 : Persian Soul
