= No One Knows About Persian Cats =

2009 film directed by Bahman Ghobadi

- Persian: کسی از گربه‌های ایرانی خبر نداره
- Directed by: Bahman Ghobadi
- Written by: Bahman Ghobadi; Hossein Mortezaeian Abkenar; Roxana Saberi
- Produced by: Bahman Ghobadi
- Starring: Hamed Behdad; Ashkan Kooshanejad; Negar Shaghaghi
- Cinematography: Turaj Aslani
- Edited by: Haydeh Safi-Yari
- Music by: Ashkan Kooshanejad; Mahdyar Aghajani
- Production company: Mij Film
- Release date: May 14, 2009
- Running time: 106 minutes
- Country: Iran
- Language: Persian

No One Knows About Persian Cats (Persian: کسی از گربه‌های ایرانی خبر نداره, romanized: Kasi az Gorbehaye Irani Khabar Nadareh) is a 2009 Iranian film directed by Bahman Ghobadi produced by Wild Bunch. The film offers the perspective of Iran as it explores its underground rock scene. It won the Special Jury Prize Ex-aequo in the Un Certain Regard section at the 2009 Cannes Film Festival.

== Plot ==
The film follows two young musicians (Ashkan Kooshanejad and Negar) as they form a band and prepare to leave Iran shortly after being released from prison. The pair befriends a man named Nader (Hamed Behdad), an underground music enthusiast and producer who helps them travel around Tehran and its surrounding areas in order to meet other underground musicians possibly interested in forming a band and later leaving the country.

== Cast ==
- Hamed Behdad
- Ashkan Kooshanejad
- Negar Shaghaghi

== Bands and musicians ==
- Take It Easy Hospital
- Rana Farhan
- Hichkas
- Meysam Eddie
- The Yellow Dogs
- Shervin Najafian
- Ash Koosha
- Mirza (band)
- The Free Keys
- Mahdyar Aghajani
- Darkoob
- Hamed Seyed Javadi
- Nik Aein Band

== International cinema release dates ==
- 23 December 2009: France
- 3 February 2010: Belgium
- 26 March 2010: U.K.

Limited release: Curzon Soho and key cities

- 16 April 2010: U.S. (New York City only)
- 16 April 2010: Italy
- 15 July 2010: Israel

== Reception ==
On the review aggregator website Rotten Tomatoes, 95% of 62 critics' reviews are positive, with an average rating of 7.3/10. The website's consensus reads: "Bringing a dose of humor and a fresh perspective to a very serious subject, No One Knows About Persian Cats is an exhilarating, quietly powerful tribute to the courage of Iran's underground musicians." Metacritic, which uses a weighted average, assigned the film a score of 71 out of 100, based on 18 critics, indicating "generally favorable" reviews.

=== Accolades ===
Its first official screening was at the 2009 Cannes Film Festival where it won the Special Jury Prize Ex-aequo in the Un Certain Regard section.

- Cannes Film Festival:
  - Special Jury Prize Ex-aequo in the Un Certain Regard section
  - François Chalais Prize award

== Accusations ==
Shortly after the release of the movie, Iranian director Torang Abedian accused Ghobadi of having used many ideas for his movie from her documentary Not an Illusion, made from 2003 to 2008 and released in the same year. According to Abedian, her camera operator got a call from Ghobadi and left her afterwards to make the movie about the same topic with Ghobadi in a few days.
