= Moon and Stone (Mah-o Sang) =

Studio album by Rana Farhan
- Released: 2011
- Recorded: 2011
- Genre: Blues; Jazz; Experimental
- Length: 45 minutes

Rana Farhan chronology
| Your Wish (2009) | Moon and Stone (2011) |

Moon and Stone is the third album of Rana Farhan, an Iranian musician and singer of jazz and blues. It was released in 2011.

== Track listing ==
1. "Tangled" - 4:21
2. "One Breath" - 4:30
3. "Slave to the Moment" - 5:00
4. "Blind Star" - 4:07
5. "I Stand By You" - 3:19
6. "How Sweet the Sugar" - 4:23
7. "The Moon and the Stone" - 3:57
8. "Caravan" - 5:13
9. "Iran" - 5:59
10. "For Our Heart" - 4:32
