= Your Wish (Arezoo-Ye To) =

Studio album by Rana Farhan
- Released: 2009
- Recorded: 2009
- Genre: Blues; Jazz; Experimental

Rana Farhan chronology
| I Return (2007) | Your Wish (Arezoo-Ye To) (2009) | Moon and Stone (2011) |

Your Wish (Arezoo-Ye To) is the second album of Rana Farhan, an Iranian musician and singer of jazz and blues. It was released in 2009.

== Track listing ==
1. "I'm Drunk You're Mad"
2. "My Work"
3. "It Will Be"
4. "Ode to Life"
5. "Love Song"
6. "Spring Morning"
7. "In the Heart of Fire"
8. "Your Wish"
9. "Moonlight"
