= I Return (Baz Amadam) =

Studio album by Rana Farhan
- Released: 2007
- Recorded: 2007
- Genre: Blues; Jazz; Experimental

Rana Farhan chronology
| I Return (Baz Amadam) (2007) | Your Wish (2009) |

I Return (Baz Amadam) is the debut album of Rana Farhan, an Iranian musician and singer of jazz and blues. It was released in 2007.

== Track listing ==
1. "Open the Door"
2. "Better Drowned In Wine"
3. "Drunk With Love"
4. "I Return"
5. "I Don't Know"
6. "Rumi's Prayer"
7. "Don't Go Without Me"
8. "Since You've Been Mine"
