= Koutaiba Al Janabi =

Koutaiba Al-Janabi is a British-based Iraqi filmmaker, director and photographer. He filmed Wasteland: Between London and Baghdad and the 2010 award-winning film, Leaving Baghdad. He is a member of the Hungarian Society of Cinematographers.

== Early life ==
Koutaiba was born in Baghdad. In Budapest, Hungary he studied photojournalism. His diploma project was about Palestinian refugee camps in Lebanon. He attended the Budapest Academy of Drama and Cinema, qualifying as a cinematographer. He studied under Lajos Koltai, Oscar-nominated cinematographer defining the “Hungarian style” of lighting and composition. He worked in the Hungarian film and television industry and completed a PhD on the aesthetics and history of Arab cinema at ELTE University before relocating to London. Koutaiba worked as a cinematographer on various films, produced and directed programmes for MBC and produced/directed short films and documentaries. He moved into screenwriting and directing feature films. His first feature film was Leaving Bagdhad. Independently produced, the film was well received and won awards and was shown at festivals and screenings. Raindance, the British Film Institute, the Gulf Film Festival, festivals in Ghent, Monaco, Sweden, Thailand, Fiji, Spain, Germany and Iran selected Leaving Baghdad for their programmes.

The main themes in Al-Janabi's work are displacement, alienation and exile.

Al-Janabi's early films were published as a DVD under the title Stories of Passers Through. His photographic work is widely published and exhibited (Foto Magazin Hungary, British Journal of Photography, Black and White magazine). He produced two collections of his photographic work in his books Far from Baghdad and Foreign Light.

== Filmography ==
BIFA winner, Cinema for Peace nominee, Gulf Film Festival prize winner, Monaco Film Festival prize winner etc.

- Leaving Baghdad Feature film (2010) Director/Writer - BIFA winner, Cinema for Peace nominee, Gulf Film Festival prize winner, Monaco Film Festival prize winner etc.
- Wasteland: Between London and Baghdad (1998)
- An English Sheikh and a Yemeni Gentleman Yemen (2000)
- Jiyan (2002) Cinematographer.
- Still Life (short)
- The Train (short)
- The Ever Restless man (portrait)
- Against the Light (portrait)
- No Man's Land (short)
- Baghdadi Correspondent (documentary)
- Seven Days with Gypsies
- Jiyan
- Emotional Backgammon
- Winter of Love

== Awards ==
- Raindance Award at the 14th British Independent Film Awards (BIFAs)
- Best Cinematography Award of the XVII Hungarian Festival of Commercials
- Best Cinematography Award of the Independent Arabic Film Festival in 1999
- First Prize at the Gulf Film Festival
- Special Prize at the Monaco Charity Film Festival

== See also ==
- Iraqi art
- List of Iraqi artists
