= Marooned in Iraq =

- Marooned in Iraq film poster
- Directed by: Bahman Ghobadi
- Written by: Bahman Ghobadi
- Produced by: Bahman Ghobadi
- Starring: Shahab Ebrahimi, Faegh Mohamadi, Rojan Hosseini
- Release date: 2002
- Running time: 108 minutes
- Country: Iran
- Language: Kurdish/Persian

Marooned in Iraq (Persian: گم‌گشته‌ای در عراق/Gomgashte i dar Aragh, and also known as Songs of My Motherland Persian: آوازهای سرزمین مادری‌ام) is a 2002 Iranian (Kurdish/Persian) film written and directed by Bahman Ghobadi and produced in Iran. It was screened in the Un Certain Regard section at the 2002 Cannes Film Festival.

== Plot ==
Mirza, a famous Kurdish musician, hears that his (ex-)wife, Hanareh, is in trouble. Accompanied by his two sons, he embarks on an adventurous journey across the Iran-Iraq border to find her.

== Cast ==
- Shahab Ebrahimi - Mirza
- Faegh Mohamadi - Barat
- Allah-Morad Rashtian - Audeh
- Rojan Hosseini - Rojan
- Saeed Mohammadi - The Teacher
- Iran Ghobadi - Hanareh

== Awards ==
1. Gold Plaque, Chicago International Film Festival, 2002.
2. François Chalais Award, Cannes Film Festival, 2002.
3. International Jury Award, São Paulo International Film Festival, Brazil, 2002.
4. Aurora and Don Quixote Awards, Tromsø International Film Festival, Norway, 2003.

== See also ==
- Kurdish Cinema
