= Jano Rosebiani =

Iraqi-Kurdish American filmmaker (born 2004)

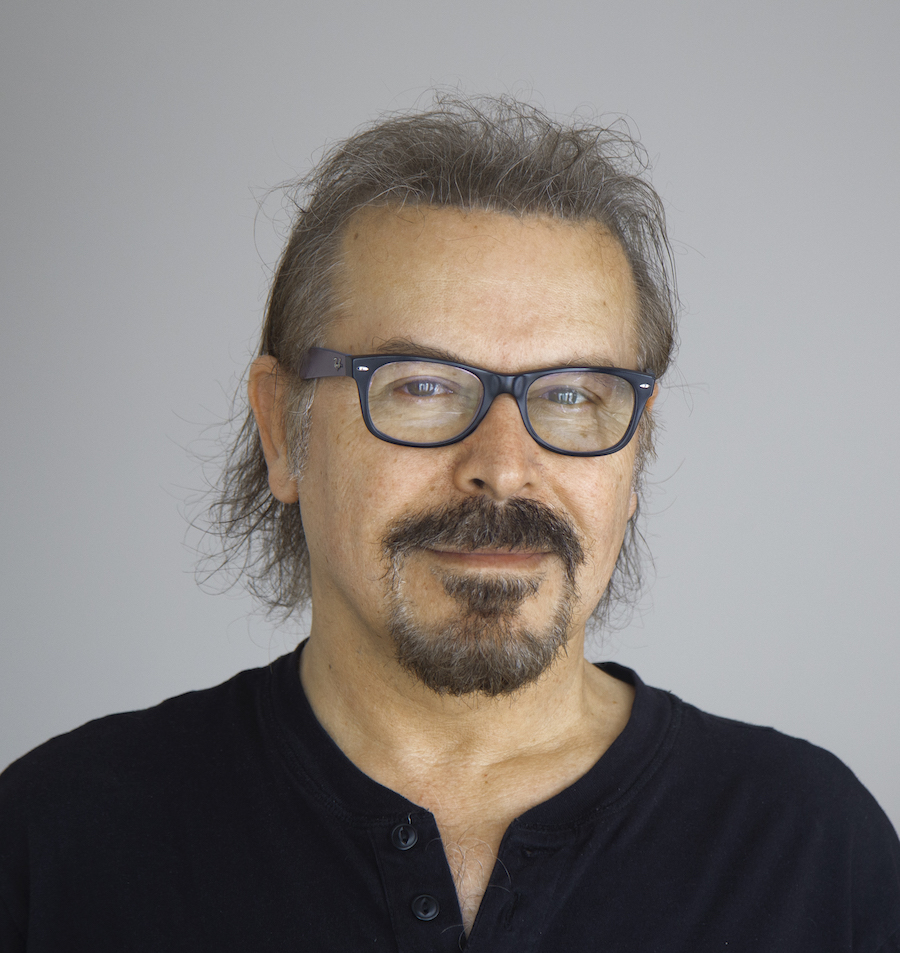
- Jano Rosebiani
- Born: March 18, 1961; Zummar, Kurdistan, Iraq
- Occupations: Filmmaker, Director, Screenwriter
- Years active: 1995–present
- Notable work: Jiyan, Chaplin of the Mountains, One Candle, Two Candles
- Children: 2

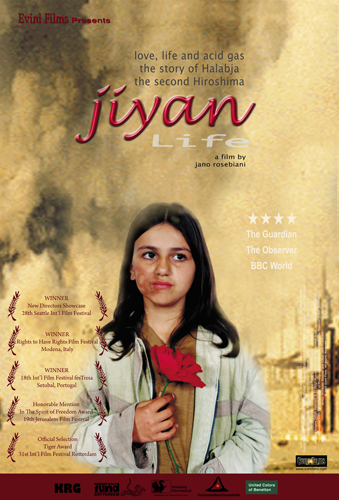

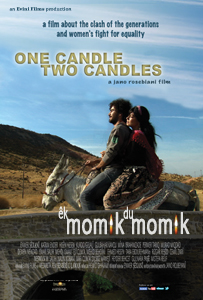

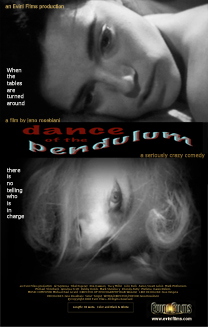

Jano Rosebiani (Kurdish: Cano Rojbeyanî) is a Kurdish American filmmaker. He is the winner of numerous international awards and has been listed in the top 35 world filmmakers in the book "Cineaste Uit De Schaduw" (Filmmakers from the Shadow) by Belgian celebrity photographer Kris De Witte.

Rosebiani was born in a small Kurdish town of Zumar on the banks of the Tigris and was raised and schooled in the town of Zakho. At the age of 14 he along with the entire family took off to the mountains to join the historical Kurdish uprising of 1974. During the time he spent on the snow-covered mountains while often hiding in caves or in camouflaged shelters under the omnipresent Iraqi aerial bombardment, he tried his hands at sketching portraits and script-writing, drawing from what little knowledge he had acquired from reading superhero comics (Tarzan, Superman, Batman) and from watching spaghetti Westerns back in Zakho. Two years later (1976) he received political asylum in the United States.

Rosebiani acquired the knowledge of filmmaking at NOVA community college in the mid eighties while managing movie theaters and making experimental videos for a cable television in Northern Virginia.

Rosebiani's film debut, Dance of the Pendulum (1995) a parody to exploitation in Hollywood b-movies, was lensed entirely in the house of the late Liberace in Studio City, California, doubled as a mountain cabin.

However, Rosebiani's true calling was to bring the stories of his oppressed people to the big screen at a time when Kurdish cinema was still to be born -the only Kurdish film that had captured the attention of the West was Yılmaz Güney's Palme d'Or prize winner, "Yol" (1982). In 2001 Rosebiani folded his Burbank-based production house and headed to the liberated Kurdish region of Iraq (South Kurdistan) where he made his first Kurdish film, Jiyan (Life).

Jiyan was the first film made in South Kurdistan. It's about the aftermath of the infamous chemical attack of 1988, thus often referred to as 'the Halabja movie'. It was nominated for the Tiger Award at International Film Festival Rotterdam, and became a festival favorite receiving numerous awards and high critical acclaim, including four-star ratings by BBC World and The Guardian.

Rosebiani's follow up were two documentaries: Saddam's Mass Graves (2003) and Chemical Ali (2004) both depicting Saddam Husseins and his cousin's crimes against the Kurds. Saddam's Mass Graves toured the United States following its premiere at the Tribeca Film Festival in 2004.

Rosebiani's television productions include a sitcom pilot (3 episodes) entitled Radio Citadel (2006), and a dramatic series pilot entitled House of Hope (2014) about gender-related violence and women's empowerment.

Rosebiani's narrative features, Chaplin of the Mountains (2013) and One Candle, Two Candles (Kurdish title: Êk Momik, Du Momik) (2014) opened in NYC to mixed reviews.

"Chaplin..." was chosen as NYT critics' pick (Feb. 22, 2015) during its USA theatrical run. "Chaplin..." is the first English language film made in the Kurdistan region with a mixed cast of locals, Americans, and Europeans.

"Candles..." was selected as a candidate for the 2015 Golden Globes Award. "Candles..." tackles domestic violence in a patriarchal society while depicting a headlong confrontation between the old school and the new generation.

Rosebiani's latest work is the documentary The 100-Day Promise about the war with ISIS in Iraq.

Rosebiani lives between California and Kurdistan, and has two children (Avesta born 2004, and Janovan born 2006).

== Filmography ==
- Dance of the Pendulum – 1995
- Jiyan (Life) – 2002
- Saddam's Mass Graves (documentary) – 2003
- Chemical Ali's Anfal (documentary) – 2004
- Radyo Qelat (Radio Citadel) (Sitcom) – 2007
- Chaplin of the Mountains – 2013
- One Candle, Two Candles – 2014
- The House of Hope (TV series pilot) – 2014
- The 100-Day Promise (documentary) – 2015

== Awards ==
- Nominated – Tiger Award – Rotterdam International Film Festival – 2002
- Winner – Special Jury Award – New Director's Showcase, Seattle Int'l Film Festival – 2002
- Winner – Best film – Festroia International Film Festival, Setúbal, Portugal – 2002
- Special Mention – In The Spirit of Freedom Award – 19th Jerusalem Int'l Film Festival – 2002
- Winner – Best film – Rights to Have Rights Film Festival, Modena, Italy – 2003

== Reviewer quotes ==
Chaplin of the Mountains:

- "Writer and director, Jano Rosebiani, brings a surprising lightness to his material, which is further buoyed by a melodic soundtrack and Jonas Sacks's lovely landscape photography".

One Candle, Two Candles:

- "[Rosebiani] manages to depict the still horrendous conditions faced by the region's women while demonstrating the growing artistic freedom seeping into its milieu".
