= Turtles Can Fly =

2004 Kurdish film directed by Bahman Ghobadi

- US theatrical release poster
- Directed by: Bahman Ghobadi
- Written by: Bahman Ghobadi
- Produced by: Babak Amini; Hamid Ghobadi; Hamid Ghavami; Bahman Ghobadi
- Starring: Soran Ebrahim; Avaz Latif
- Cinematography: Shahriar Assadi
- Edited by: Mostafa Kherghehpoosh; Hayedeh Safiyari
- Music by: Hossein Alizadeh
- Production companies: Mij Film Co.; Bac Film
- Distributed by: IFC Films (US)
- Release dates: 10 September 2004 (Toronto); 18 February 2005 (United States); 23 February 2005 (France)
- Running time: 97 minutes
- Countries: Iran; France; Iraq
- Language: Kurdish
- Box office: $816,975

Turtles Can Fly (Note: Kurdish: کیسەڵەکانیش دەفڕن; Persian: لاک‌پشت‌ها هم پرواز می‌کنند; Arabic: السلاحف تستطيع الطيران) (Kurdish: Kûsî jî dikarin bifirin) is a 2004 Iranian-Kurdish war drama film written, directed, and co-produced by Bahman Ghobadi. The film stars Soran Ebrahim, Avaz Latif, Saddam Hossein Faysal, Hiresh Feysal Rahman, Abdolrahman Karim, Ajil Zibari. The plot revolves around three refugee children near the Iraqi-Turkish border, waiting for the Americans to invade Iraq and overthrow Saddam Hussein.

Turtles Can Fly was the first film to be made after the 2003 invasion of Iraq. It had its premiere at 2004 Toronto International Film Festival.

== Plot ==
The film is set in the Kurdish refugee camp on the Iraq–Turkey border on the eve of the US invasion of Iraq. 13 year-old Soran, known by the alias “Kak Satellite”, is known for his installation of dishes and antenna for the villages who are looking for news about Saddam Hussein. He is also known for his limited knowledge of the English language, which he learns because he interacts with the Americans when they invade. He is the dynamic but manipulative leader of a group of children organizing the dangerous but necessary tasks of sweeping and clearing of the minefields. Many of the children are injured in an attempt to retrieve the mines, but still maintain a boisterous prattle whenever possible, devoted to their work in spite of the vagaries of their life.

The industrious Kak Satellite arranges trade-ins for undetonated mines. He falls for a girl named Agrin, an orphan from Halabja who has recently came to the refugee camps, assisting her whenever possible in order to win her over. She is a perpetual sour-faced girl who is part bitter and part lost in thought, unable to escape the demons of the past. She is traveling with her disabled but very caring brother Hengov, who has the gift of clairvoyance that gives him a bad reputation. The siblings stay with a blind toddler named Riga, who they introduce as their "little brother", but it is revealed through flashbacks that Agrin gave birth to Riga after she was gang raped by Ba'ath soldiers, while Hengov's arms had been shot as the soldiers attempted to drown both of them. Agrin is unable to accept Riga as anything besides a taint, a continuous reminder of her brutal past.

Agrin tries to abandon Riga and commit suicide on multiple occasions; she once tries to drown herself in a lake, but gives up. She then attempts to tie Riga to a tree to abandon him, however, he frees himself and wanders around until he gets stuck in a minefield. Kak Satellite tries to rescue Riga, but a mine blows up on the older boy, injuring his leg. After multiple tries, Agrin finally leaves their tent in the middle of the night and ties a rock around Riga’s leg, throwing him to the bottom of the lake. Afterwards, she commits suicide by jumping from a cliff. When Hengov wakes, he sees a vision of Riga drowning and hurries out of the tent to save him, but instead finds Kak Satellite sitting on the beach, having failed to rescue Riga himself. Hengov eventually finds his nephew's body at the bottom of the lake but can't cut it loose from the rock due to his disability, and is left to grieve on the cliff from where Agrin jumped to her death. Meanwhile, a disabled Kak Satellite loses any charm he had about the American intervention and looks away when the American soldiers finally pass by him.

== Cast ==
- Soran Ebrahim as Kak Satellite/Soran
- Avaz Latif as Agrin
- Saddam Hossein Faysal as Pashow
- Hiresh Feysal Rahman as Hengov
- Abdol Rahman Karim as Riga
- Ajil Zibari as Shirkooh

== Production ==
2 weeks after the fall of Saddam Hussein's regime, Ghobadi filmed a few scenes for the film on his camcorder in Iraq. He was inspired to make the film by observing the footage of children he had recorded, returning to the country illegally because the crew was not granted permission to enter. The crew, each possessing a small camera, searched the northeastern area of Iraq for actors and locations. Only 20% of the film's script had been written when Ghobadi arrived in the country. With the exception of the cinematographer and sound designer, the entire cast and crew was Iraqi. The Barzani government gave the production 20 bodyguards for protection due to the unstable environment post-invasion. Ghobadi described the film as "an anti-war movie without slogans", and chose the title to make viewers think the film was made by Disney.

== Reception ==
=== Critical response ===
On the review aggregator Rotten Tomatoes, the film holds an approval rating of 88% based on 73 reviews, with an average rating of 7.70/10. The site's critical consensus reads "Set in Iraq after the fall of Saddam, Turtles Can Fly is being hailed as extraordinary, moving, and lyrical." On Metacritic, the film has a weighted average score of 85 out of 100, based on 31 critics, indicating "universal acclaim".

Film critic Roger Ebert gave the film four out of four stars, describing the film's story as "the actual lives of refugees, who lack the luxury of opinions because they are preoccupied with staying alive in a world that has no place for them". David Sterritt of The Christian Science Monitor praised the film saying, "Superb acting and authentic details energize this rare Iran/Iraq coproduction.". Michael Koresky of IndieWire praised the film writing, "Rarely does a film feel this urgent, like a message in a bottle accidentally washed ashore."

The film was included in the list of best war movies of all time by Jacob Osborn and Megan Drillinger of News Channel Nebraska, where it was placed on the 35th position.

== Awards ==
1. Special Mention by the Youth Jury, Berlin International Film Festival, 2005
2. Golden Seashell, Best Film, San Sebastián International Film Festival, 2004
3. Special Jury Prize, Chicago International Film Festival, 2004
4. International Jury and Audience Awards, São Paulo International Film Festival, 2004
5. La Pieza Award, Best Film, Mexico City International Contemporary Film Festival, 2005
6. Audience Award, Rotterdam International Film Festival, 2005
7. Golden Prometheus, Best Film, Tbilisi International Film Festival, 2005
8. Aurora Award, Tromsø International Film Festival, 2005
9. Golden Butterfly, Isfahan International Festival of Films for Children, 2004
10. Gold Dolphin, Festróia - Tróia International Film Festival, 2005
11. Sundance Selection, 2005
12. Silver Skeleton Award Harvest Moonlight Festival 2007

== In popular culture ==
The film had an influence on the 2007-2009 Gundam anime series Mobile Suit Gundam 00. The anime's main protagonist Setsuna F. Seiei is a war orphan of Kurdish origins and his real name is Soran Ibrahim, a reference to the child actor portraying the protagonist of Turtles Can Fly. The film was sampled by Jay Electronica in his 2007 mixtape Act I: Eternal Sunshine (The Pledge).

== See also ==
- Kurdish Cinema
