= A Time for Drunken Horses =

- Film poster
- Directed by: Bahman Ghobadi
- Written by: Bahman Ghobadi
- Produced by: Bahman Ghobadi
- Starring: Nezhad Ekhtiar-dini; Amaneh Ekhtiar-dini; Madi Ekhtiar-dini; Ayoub Ahmadi; Jouvin Younessi
- Music by: Hossein Alizadeh
- Release date: 2000
- Running time: 80 minutes
- Country: Iran
- Languages: Kurdish; Persian

A Time for Drunken Horses (Kurdish: Dema hespên serxweş; Persian: زمانی برای مستی اسب‌ها, Zamāni barāy-e masti-e asbhā) is a 2000 Kurdish language drama film directed by Bahman Ghobadi and produced in Iran. It was a co-winner of the Caméra d'Or award at the Cannes Film Festival in 2000. Leonard Maltin notes that the film was "written by the director and shot in his native village, with a cast of extraordinary non-professionals."

== Plot ==
A Kurdish family is trying to survive after the death of its parents. Ayoub, the eldest boy in the family, becomes the head of the household and must do whatever work available to survive. Madi, Ayoub's handicapped brother, is in need of surgery. Ayoub goes to great lengths to collect money for the surgery. He becomes a kolbar and smuggles truck tires with a group of Kurdish villagers near the Iran-Iraq border. Ayoub ultimately falls short of his intended goal and his uncle decides to marry off his sister in return for the groom's family financing Madi's surgery on the Iraqi side of the border. When they arrive the mother of the groom refuses to accept Madi and agrees to give Ayoub and his uncle a mule as compensation. Ayoub decides to take the mule to Iraq, where it is worth more, and sell it to pay for his brother's surgery. Some smugglers let him come along with him. They use mules to carry goods and feed them whisky, allowing them to better survive the harsh mountain winter. However, they are ambushed while heading to the border, and the mules are too drunk to carry on. Ayoub narrowly manages to escape, and the last shot is of him and his brother crossing the border.

== Cast ==
- Ayoub Ahmadi
- Rojin Younessi
- Amaneh Ekhtiar-dini
- Madi Ekhtiar-dini
- Kolsolum Ekhtiar-dini
- Karim Ekhtiar-dini
- Rahman Salehi
- Osman Karimi
- Nezhad Ekhtiar-dini

== Reception ==
Review aggregator website Rotten Tomatoes has an 85% "fresh" score based on 35 reviews. Leonard Maltin gave the film 3½ (out of 4) stars, stating the following: "The everyday struggle that these children go through just to survive is starkly, movingly conveyed."

== Awards ==
- Best Film Award, Golden Camera (Caméra d'Or), Cannes Film Festival, France, 2000.
- Special Jury Award, Silver Hugo, Chicago International Film Festival, USA, 2000.
- Best Feature Award, Edinburgh Film Festival, Scotland, UK, 2000.
- Best Feature Award, Santa Fe Film Festival, Fort Lauderdale, USA, 2000.
- Grand Jury Award, São Paulo International Film Festival, Brazil, 2000.
- Best Feature, Banff International Film Festival, Canada, 2000.
- Special Jury Award, Gijón International Film Festival, Spain, 2000.
- Best feature Award, Children Film Festival, Isfahan, Iran, 2000.

== Home media ==
The film was released on VHS in letterbox format on 29 July 2003. Lorber Films (Kino) released it on DVD in Region 1 on 15 February 2011, with English subtitles.

== See also ==
- Kurdish cinema
