= Jiyan =

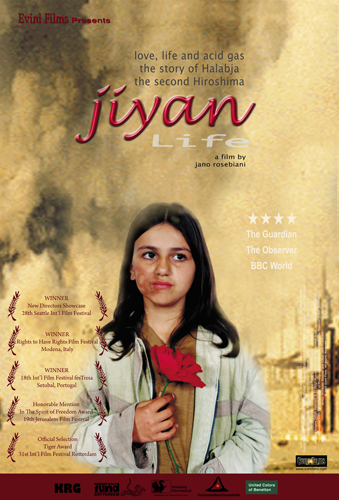
- Film poster
- Directed by: Jano Rosebiani
- Written by: Jano Rosebiani
- Produced by: Jano Rosebiani
- Starring: Pirshang Berzinji; Kurdo Galali
- Cinematography: Koutaiba Al Janabi
- Production company: Evini Films
- Release date: 2001
- Running time: 102 minutes
- Language: Kurdish

Jiyan (Life in Kurdish) is a 2001 film written and directed by the Kurdish director Jano Rosebiani.

== Plot ==
Diyar, a Kurdish-American, returns to his hometown of Halabja to build an orphanage five years after the chemical bombing. There, he meets Jiyan and Şêrko, orphan survivors of the attack. During his stay in the town, Diyar brings a short lived spark of hope and happiness to the children's lives, and as he leaves, the orphans go back to their lonely lives. Diyar leaves tearful Jiyan at the place where they met first: on a swing under a lonely tree on a small hill.

== Awards ==
- Special Jury Award, New Director's Showcase, Seattle International Film Festival, 2002
- Best Film Award, Man and his Environment, International Film Festival Festoria, Portugal, 2002
- Popular Jury Award, Rights to Have Rights Film Festival, Italy, 2003

== Cast ==
- Kurdo Gelalî
- Derya Qadir
- Pirşeng Berzencî
- Çoman Hewramî
- Enwer Şêxanî
- Rûbar Ehmed
- Niyaz Letîf
- Tara Ebdulrehman
