= Ashkan Kooshanejad =

Iranian entrepreneur and musician (b. 1985)

- Origin: Tehran, Iran
- Genres: Electronic; Experimental; Soundtrack; Ambient
- Occupations: Entrepreneur, artist, film director
- Years active: 2007–present
- Labels: Olde English Spelling Bee; Ninja Tune; Realms

Ashkan Kooshanejad (Persian: اشکان کوشانژاد; born 13 August 1985), also known as Ash Koosha, is a British-Iranian technology entrepreneur, multidisciplinary artist, and futurist. He is known to use computer software such as artificial intelligence and virtual reality in his work. He is the CEO and co-founder of Oorbit Inc. and one of the founders of Auxuman Inc.

== Early life and education ==
Kooshanejad was born and raised in Tehran, Iran. He studied music at the Tehran Conservatory of Music.

== Career ==
Kooshanejad played the lead role in an Iranian-Cannes jury prize winner docufiction film by director Bahman Ghobadi called No One Knows About Persian Cats, which follows his band's story scouring the Iranian underground music scene trying to find musicians to play in a festival in the UK. Kooshanejad sought asylum in the UK due to the reaction to the film in Iran.

Kooshanejad released the album GUUD in 2015. The video for "I Feel That" was directed by digital artist Hirad Sab. The album has received positive feedback and support from music critics such as Pitchfork. The album holds a rating of 4.4/5 on Discogs.

He released his second album I AKA I on London label Ninja Tune, which holds a rating of 4/5 on AllMusic and 79 on Metacritic. I AKA I was accompanied by CGI videos created by Hirad Sab and was premiered on Adult Swim.

In 2015, he introduced the concept for the world's first virtual reality album and has developed multi-sensory experiences for songs such as Snow, OTE, Stained and Eluded since. He has performed using a virtual reality headset for the first time at the London Institute of Contemporary Art, in collaboration with TheWaveVR.

In 2018, he introduced a virtual singer named "YONA" which uses text-to-speech processed through an associated software to create human-sounding singing.

In 2019, he founded Auxuman Inc., a technology company building virtual musicians using artificial intelligence.

In 2021, he founded Oorbit inc., a cloud computing company that makes infrastructure for the metaverse.

== Discography ==
=== Albums ===
| Year | Title |
|---|---|
| 2015 | GUUD: Released: 8 June 2015; Label: Olde English Spelling Bee; Formats: LP, digital download |
| 2016 | I AKA I: Released: 1 April 2016; Label: Ninja Tune; Formats: LP, digital download |
| 2017 | CHIMERA EP: Released: 14 July 2017; Label: Ninja Tune; Formats: digital download |
| 2018 | AKTUAL: Released: 30 March 2018; Label: Realms; Formats: digital download |
| 2018 | Unnamed: Released: 30 May 2018; Label: Self-released; Formats: digital download |
| 2018 | Return 0: Released: 21 September 2018; Label: Realms; Formats: digital download |
| 2018 | A OK: Released: 24 September 2018; Label: Realms; Formats: digital download |
| 2018 | STAMINA: Released: 13 November 2018; Label: Realms; Formats: digital download |

=== Singles ===
| Year | Title |
|---|---|
| 2016 | "Biutiful": Released: 2016; Label: Ninja Tune; Formats: digital download |
| 2016 | "Faint": Released: 2016; Label: Ninja Tune; Formats: digital download |
| 2018 | "Aroha": Released: 2018; Label: Realms; Formats: digital download |

== Filmography ==
| Year | Title | Functioned as | | | | |
| Year | Title | director | Screenwriter | Producer | Composer | Actor |
|---|---|---|---|---|---|---|
| 2009 | No One Knows About Persian Cats (Feature) | No | No | No | Yes | Yes |
| 2015 | Fermata (Feature) | Yes | Yes | Yes | Yes | No |
| 2017 | Another News Story (Feature/Documentary) | No | No | No | Yes | No |
