= Kalbari =

Coordinates: 22.2725°N 89.2032°E

Kalbari, sometimes also called Kolbari, is a village in Burigoalini Union, Shyamnagar Upazila, Satkhira District, Bangladesh. In Kalbari, girls' school attendance is markedly higher than that of boys: 47% vs 34%.

== Water ==
Kalbari is known for having a sand-filter well that purifies water drawn from the muddy fishponds, the only source for drinking water in the area. In a study, about three quarters of households in Kalbari said that their area did not have enough drinking water. Households would like more water for drinking, cooking and cleaning.
