= 1,001 Apples =

2013 Kurdish documentary film

1001 Apples
- Sorani Kurdish: هەزار و یەک سێو
- Directed by: Taha Karimi
- Written by: Taha Karimi; Karzan Kardozi
- Starring: Ghahar Khalil Mouhamad; Ababakar Ali Said; Hashim Mouhamad Rashid; Faraj Mouhamad Aziz; Abdulkarim Naif Hassan
- Cinematography: Mehdi Azadi
- Release date: 1 July 2013
- Running time: 74 minutes
- Country: Kurdistan Region - Iraq
- Language: Kurdish

1001 Apples (Sorani Kurdish: هەزار و یەک سێو) is a 2013 Kurdish documentary film that focuses on five Kurdish survivors of the Anfal campaign. The film won the Asia Pacific Screen Award for Best Documentary Film in 2014.

== Plot ==
In 1988, the Iraqi Ba'ath regime perpetrated the Anfal campaign, a systematic genocide that claimed the lives of 182,000 Kurds. Their remains were subsequently interred in 350 mass graves. Of those buried, only ten individuals are known to have escaped. One survivor, Faraj, was later brought to the United States with the assistance of Human Rights Watch.

Years later, Faraj returned to Southern Kurdistan and established a collective of Iraqi mass grave survivors dedicated to raising awareness of the Kurdish genocide committed during the Anfal campaign. As part of this effort, Faraj and four fellow survivors distribute 1,001 red apples studded with cloves to families of Anfal victims. These clove apples have since become a poignant symbol of reconciliation.

== Cast ==
- Ghahar Khalil Mouhamad as Ghahar
- Ababakar Ali Said as Ababakar
- Hashim Mouhamad Rashid as Hashim
- Faraj Mouhamad Aziz as Faraj
- Abdulkarim Naif Hassan as Abdulkarim
