= Kolbar =

Cross border labourer

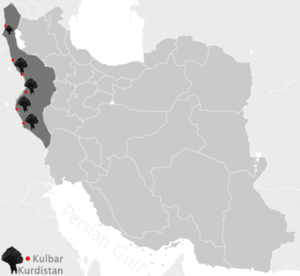
- Border regions where kolbars are active.

Occupation
- Synonyms: Cross-border laborer, Kolber
- Occupation type: Laborer, Smuggler
- Activity sectors: Transport, Smuggling

Description
- Competencies: Carrying goods across borders, endurance, survival skills
- Education required: Informal, no formal training (usually learned through experience)
- Fields of employment: Kurdish regions (Iran, Iraq, Turkey, Syria)
- Related jobs: Porter, Smuggler

A kolbar (Persian: کول‌بر) or kolber (Kurdish: کۆڵبەر) are Kurdish border porters who carry goods across borders on foot or on horseback, legally or illegally, often outside official crossing points. Kolbars mainly transport goods from Iraqi Kurdistan into Iran's West Azerbaijan, Kurdistan, and Kermanshah provinces, but they also carry goods across the borders of Syria and Turkey.

Most kolbars live in Iranian Kurdistan, where the Kurdish provinces are among the poorest in the country. Kolbars also live in Turkish Kurdistan and to a lesser extent Iraqi Kurdistan. Since kolbar work is mostly considered illegal, kolbar workers have no insurance, retirement plans and unions. Estimates of the number of kolbars range from 80,000 to 300,000. The phenomenon of kolbari is tied to the internal colonialization of the Kurdish region in Iran.

== Etymology ==
The word kolbar is Kurdish and consists of two parts: kol, meaning "back", and bar, meaning "load". The term kolbar therefore means "one who carries a load". The word kolbari or kolberi refers to border work in which kolbars carry goods on their backs across the borders of Iran, Iraq, and Turkey. Some English-language sources use kolbaran as a collective or non-anglicized plural form, while kolbars is often used as the standard English plural, especially when referring to specific individuals.

== Working conditions ==
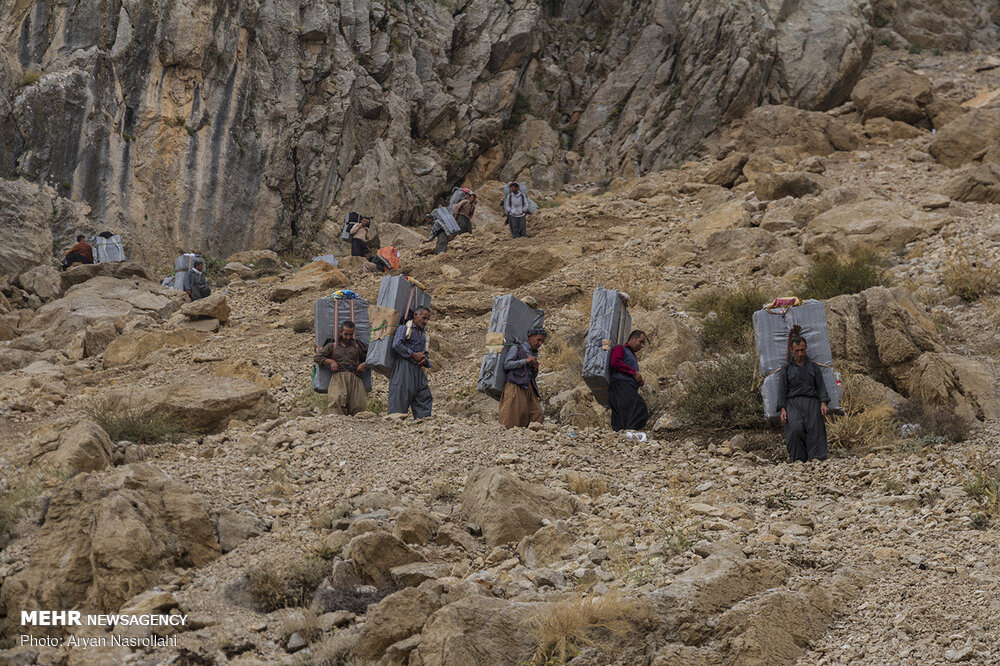
A group of kolbars

Kolberi is a relatively recent development. Although smuggling has long existed in the border regions, kolberi in its present form emerged only decades after the 1979 Iranian Revolution. Extensive unemployment and poverty has pushed some residents of several Iranian provinces into this dangerous informal cross border couriering, which involves importing goods into Iran via unofficial routes. Goods are carried across difficult mountain border areas either on the backs of kolbars or by pack animals and brought into nearby border towns and villages. They typically carry everyday consumer goods into Iran, avoiding both restrictions linked to international sanctions and Iranian customs controls. Typical items include televisions, air conditioners, heaters, cigarettes, vehicle tires, clothing, and textiles. Illegal goods such as alcohol, weapons, and narcotics are also reported, though rarely, to be smuggled across the border. The trafficking of such items is considered more dangerous and more clearly criminal than the transport of ordinary merchandise.

Kolbars earn a low and highly unstable income. They are typically paid according to the weight of the goods they carry, with rates varying by route, season, border area, inflation, exchange rates, and the type and value of the goods. Work is not consistently available, and it is so strenuous that most kolbars do not work every day. Only a small minority of kolbars transport goods by horse or mule.

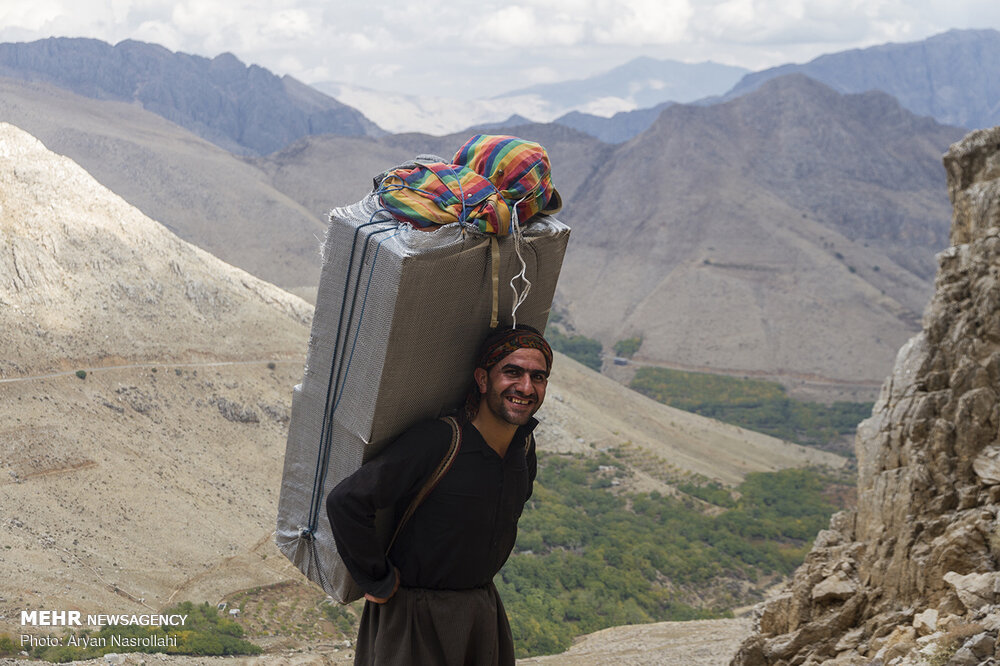
A kolbar

Kolberi is particularly widespread in Iran’s border provinces. The trade operates across a vast area. In accessible terrain, as many as 3,000 couriers may be moving goods, and even relatively short sections of the border can contain up to 25 unauthorized crossing points.

Eastern Kurdistan is widely described as one of the poorest regions of Iran, a situation often attributed to long-standing state policies that have limited investment and development in the area. Compared with other regions of the country, economic growth has remained restricted, while agriculture and industry have developed only weakly, contributing to high unemployment. Many people take up this work to survive in conditions of deep poverty.

Estimates of the number of kolbars vary widely. As of 2025, most sources put the total at about 80,000 to 300,000. Some reporting suggests that the number rises during winter, when other employment options are more limited. Most kolbars are men, but the workforce also includes women and children, and their share has been reported to be increasing.

Kolberi is widely regarded as one of the country’s most hazardous forms of work. Kolbars work under very harsh conditions and face numerous dangers, including encountering landmines left from the Iran–Iraq War, falling in steep mountainous terrain, and dying from exposure during winter storms. Furthermore, since this occupation has been declared illegal by the Iranian government, many people are killed each year by shots fired by the Iranian Revolutionary Guard border troops. In both Iran and Turkey many young male and female kolbars have been shot dead by government forces. From 2012 to 2023, at least 589 kolbars were killed and 1,617 were injured.

Among the kolbars are highly educated young people, who have no job because of high unemployment in Kurdish provinces. The proportion of women, children and people with an academic degree has increased in recent years as a result of the economic crisis in the region. Female kolbars dress as men to reduce the risk of sexual assault and to avoid social pressure.

== Legal status ==
The legal status of kolbars is ambiguous. Although Iran’s Islamic criminal law does not specifically criminalize kolbars and some kolbars receive permits, transporting goods in this way can still fall under Iran’s 2013 anti smuggling law, which criminalizes smuggling. Kolbari is not clearly defined in Iranian law and is not treated by the Islamic Republic’s legal system as a recognized occupation. As a result, kolbars are generally outside the labor protections that apply to formal work, including rules on insurance and workplace safety. This lack of legal recognition has been described as leaving them especially exposed to abuse, exploitation, and persistent injustice.

In the Kurdish areas of Iran, border security is handled by the IRGC under orders from the Supreme Leader. They have authorization to kill people who cross the border illegally. Border officials are frequently reported to mistreat kolbars, including verbal harassment and humiliating treatment. Reports also describe border guards using excessive force along well known kolbar routes, most often by shooting, but also through physical assaults. These incidents have resulted in deaths and injuries, and are often described as occurring without warning and with little accountability.

Kolbars who are caught bringing in goods subject to import tariffs may be prosecuted. When prosecutions proceed to criminal trial, such proceedings are generally considered unlikely to meet international standards of fairness.

In 2024, Iran enacted a law allowing the import of goods through kolbari and seafaring procedures for five years under a special legal framework. It defined these procedures, limited their scale, required registration and monitoring, and applied reduced duties and taxes to covered imports. The law also provided that revenue from its implementation was to be spent in the border provinces, including on livelihoods, employment, infrastructure, and anti-smuggling measures. In addition, it required the government to prepare plans and regulations on implementation, border control, and longer term employment for border residents. The text of the law did not include any explicit provision on the use of firearms by border guards against kolbars.

More than a year after the law was passed, key implementing regulations, including rules on permitted import volumes, were still unfinished. Promised executive bylaws were not approved and were instead sent back to the government's economic commission for further revision, frustrating local officials who had already announced implementation. In July 2025, Kurdistan Governor Arash Lahoni said the law was being put into effect in his province and predicted a sharp rise in legal trade. Yet reports of deadly shootings continued: according to the human rights organisation Hengaw, four more kolbars were killed by border guards within eight days of his announcement.

== Kolbar in the media ==
The situation and working conditions of Kolbar are rarely discussed in the media, usually only in the form of short reports on regional websites such as Telegram about deaths of Kolbar.

The film A Time for Drunken Horses by director Bahman Ghobadi provides a brief glimpse into the everyday life of kolbars. The term kolbar is also mentioned sporadically in books and newspapers, such as a few articles from the Kurdish media broadcaster Rudaw.

== Job creation for kolbars ==
In September 2020, the Barakat Foundation launched an event called "Kak Barakat" (Job Creation for Kolbars in Border Provinces) to create employment opportunities for kolbars by collecting plans from entrepreneurs and idealists. Around 3,000 employment projects are planned to be launched before the end of the current year, with funding of about 100 billion tomans. The projects target kolbars in the provinces of Kermanshah, West Azerbaijan, and Kurdistan, and are expected to generate nearly 10,000 direct and indirect jobs. Most of the created jobs will likely be small-scale or home-based.
