= Bahman Ghobadi =

Kurdish-Iranian film director (born 1969)

- بهمن قبادی
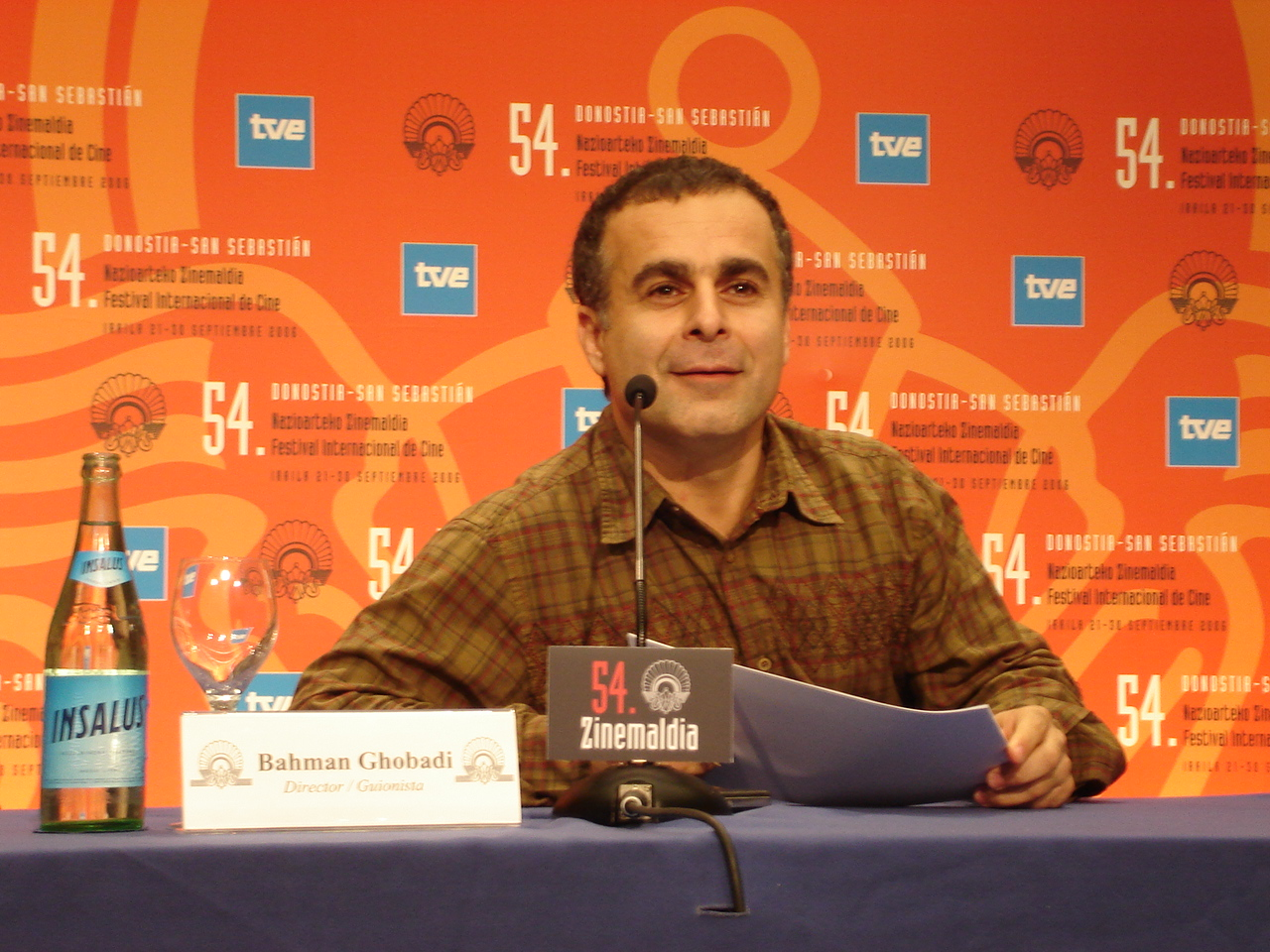
- Bahman Ghobadi at a press conference at San Sebastián Film Festival (2006)
- Born: February 1, 1969 (age 57); Baneh, Iran
- Education: Iran Broadcasting University
- Occupations: Film director, producer, writer
- Years active: 1990–present
- Era: Iranian New Wave
- Organization: Mij Film
- Known for: A Time for Drunken Horses, Turtles Can Fly, Half Moon, No One Knows About Persian Cats
- Style: Drama, social issues
- Movement: Iranian New Wave
- Awards: Caméra d'Or, Golden Shell, Un Certain Regard
- Website: http://www.mijfilm.com

Bahman Ghobadi (Persian: بهمن قبادی; Kurdish: به‌همه‌ن قوبادی, romanized: Behmen Qubadî; born February 1, 1969) is an Iranian Kurdish film director, producer and writer. He belongs to the "new wave" of Iranian cinema.

== Biography ==
He was born in Baneh, a Kurdish city in Iran. His family moved to Sanandaj in 1981. Ghobadi received a Bachelor of Arts in film directing from Iran Broadcasting College. After a brief career in industrial photography, Ghobadi began making short 8 mm films. His documentary Life in Fog won numerous awards. Bahman Ghobadi was assistant director on Abbas Kiarostami's The Wind Will Carry Us.

Bahman Ghobadi founded Mij Film in 2000, a company with the aim of production of films in Iran about its different ethnic groups. His first feature film was A Time for Drunken Horses (2000), the first Kurdish film produced in Iran. The film won the Caméra d'Or at the Cannes Film Festival. His second feature was Marooned in Iraq (2002), which brought him the Gold Plaque from the Chicago International Film Festival. His third feature, Turtles Can Fly, followed in 2004, winning the Glass Bear and Peace Film Award at the Berlin International Film Festival and the Golden Shell at the San Sebastian International Film Festival.

In 2006, Ghobadi's Half Moon won the Golden Shell at the San Sebastian International Film Festival. Iran's renowned actors Golshifteh Farahani, Hassan Poorshirazi and Hedyeh Tehrani acted in this movie. The music of the movie was made by Iran's musician Hossein Alizadeh. The film, which was a collaborative project by Iran, France, Austria and Iraq, was shot fully in Iranian Kurdistan. However, it narrates the story of a group of Iranian Kurdish musicians who would like to travel to Iraqi Kurdistan and organize a concert there.

In 2006, Index on Censorship gave Ghobadi an Index Film Award for making a significant contribution to freedom of expression through his film Turtles Can Fly.

In May 2009, his film No One Knows About Persian Cats won an Un Certain Regard Special Jury Prize ex-aequo when it premiered at the Cannes Film Festival. This film chronicles the hardships facing young Iranian musicians seeking to evade censorship.

In 2012, his next film Rhino Season was released at San Sebastian Film Festival. In this film he worked with Monica Belluci and combined an international cast.

Following critical success of this film, he also took part as one of the directors in anthology film Words with Gods directing the segment Kaboki.

In 2015, his feature documentary A Flag without a Country was released. The documentary that premiered at Sundance Film Festival is about Kurds, middle-east war and "Kurdistan", a nation with about 45m population and still without a country.

Following this documentary, he got back on fiction and directed The Four Walls in which he again assembled an international cast featuring Amir Aghaee, Funda Eryiğit and Denizhan Akbaba.

He is currently writing, directing, and producing, and actively participating in supporting human rights and freedom of speech all around the world.

== Filmography ==
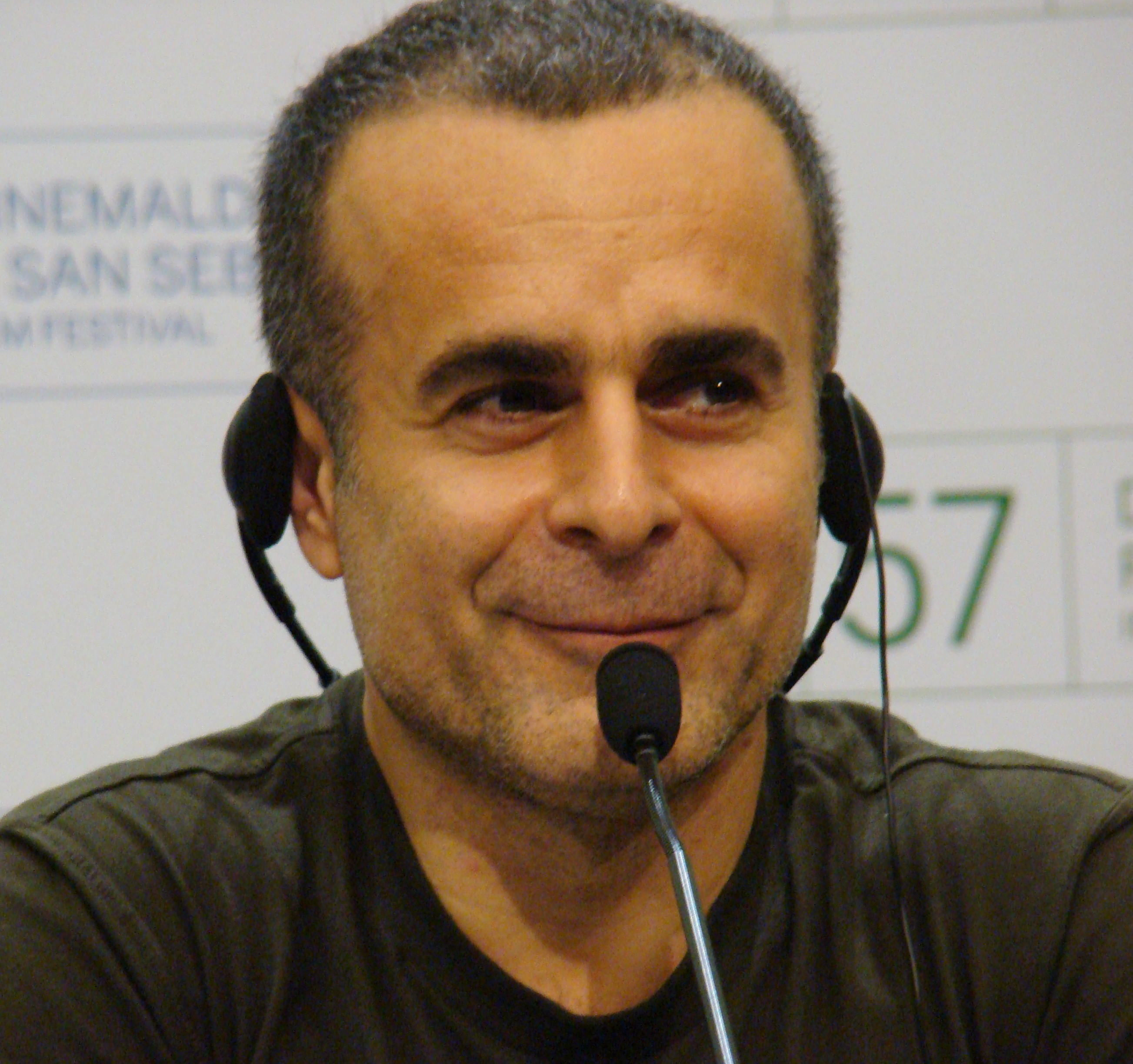
Ghobadi at the presentation of his film Nobody Knows About Persian Cats in San Sebastián 2009

=== As director ===
| Film | Date | |
|---|---|---|
| Golbaji | 1990 | short film |
| A Glance | 1990 | short film |
| Again Rain with Melody | 1995 | short film |
| Party | 1996 | short film |
| Like Mother | 1996 | short film |
| God's Fish | 1996 | short film |
| Notebook's Quote | 1996 | short film |
| Ding | 1996 | short film |
| Life in Fog | 1997 | short film |
| The Pigeon of Nader Flew | 1997 | short film |
| Telephone Booth | 1997 | short film |
| A Time for Drunken Horses | 2000 | feature film |
| Marooned in Iraq | 2002 | feature film |
| War is Over | 2003 | short film |
| Daf | 2003 | short film |
| Turtles Can Fly | 2004 | feature film |
| Half Moon | 2006 | feature film |
| No One Knows About Persian Cats | 2009 | feature film |
| Rhino Season | 2012 | feature film |
| Words with Gods, segment Kaboki | 2014 | feature film |
| A Flag without a Country | 2015 | documentary |
| The Four Walls | 2021 | feature film |
| Trees Are Watching | 2026 | feature film |

=== As actor ===
Ghobadi made a cameo appearance in the 2019 film The Irishman, where he portrayed a prison cook who serves Jimmy Hoffa an ice cream sundae. While Ghobadi does not enjoy acting, he says he appeared in the film out of respect for Martin Scorsese and Al Pacino.

=== Jury Duties ===
Ghobadi has served as jury president or jury member in many international festivals.

- 22nd Busan International Film Festival- New Currents Jury Member, Busan, South Korea, 12-21.10.2017
- 7th Off Plus Camera International Festival of Independent Cinema, Poland, 2-11 May 2014
- 14th International Film Festival of Kerala, December 2009
- The independent Film festival Off Camera Poland. 1-5 October 2008
- Eurasia International Film festival, Kazakhstan, 7-13 September, 2008
- São Paulo International Film Festival, October, 2006
- Anonimul International Film Festival, 14 to 19 August 2006
- Vila do conde International Film Festival, Portugal, 3 to 11 July, 2006
- Gwangju International Film Festival, Korea, 28 April to 6 May, 2006
- Rotterdam International Film Festival, 26 January to 6 February, 2004
- Cannes International Film Festival, Golden Shell district, 2002

=== Activism ===
Ghobadi, as an exile filmmaker, started many campaigns for freedom of speech and freedom of expression. In 2021, he wrote a letter to the Academy of Motion Pictures Arts and Science to create an initiative to give exile directors possibility to submit their work for best International Film category.

He has also played an important role on social media during the protests in Iran following the Death of Mahsa Amini in September 2022. He informed public and followers about the incidents happening in Iran, supporting the cause of Iranian people standing for themselves and against oppressive Iranian regime. He has also written an open letter to Academy of Motion Picture Arts and Science to invite the film industry to support the democratic cause of his people.
