= Cinema of France =

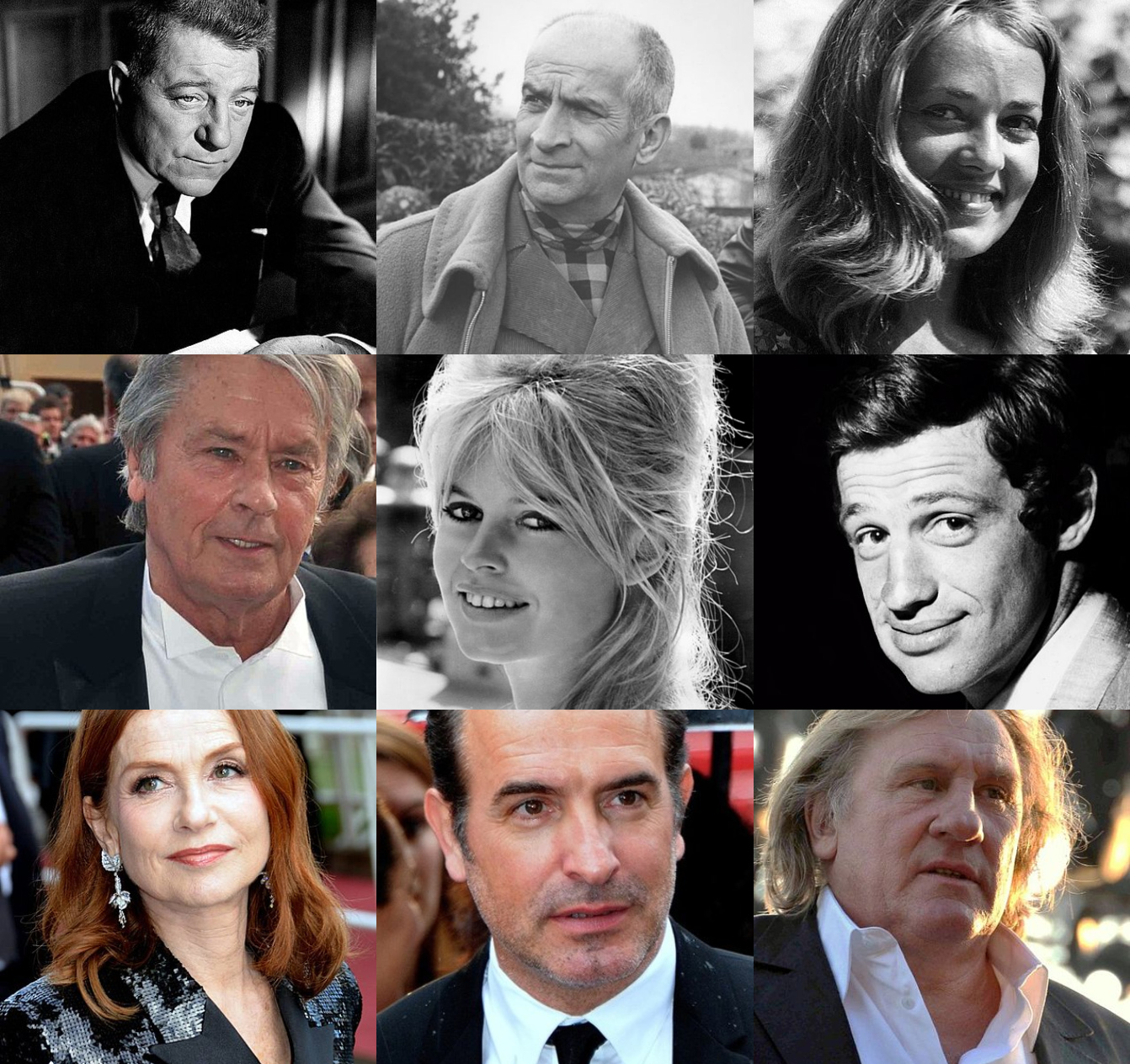
- A collage of notable French actors (Note: From top left to bottom right: Jean Gabin, Louis de Funès, Jeanne Moreau, Alain Delon, Brigitte Bardot, Jean-Paul Belmondo, Isabelle Huppert, Jean Dujardin, Gérard Depardieu)
- No. of screens: 6,354 (2024)
- Main distributors: The Walt Disney Company (16.4%); Warner Bros. (11.5%); Universal (7.5%)

Produced feature films (2024)
- Total: 401 (incl. co-productions); 263 (excl. co-productions)
- Animated: 13
- Documentary: 105

Number of admissions (2024)
- Total: 181.5 million
- National films: 79.5 million (44.8%)

Gross box office (2024) (Note: Feature films only)
- Total: €1.32 billion
- National films: €559.40 million (42.3%)

The cinema of France comprises the film industry and its film productions, whether made within the nation of France or by French film production companies abroad. It is the oldest and largest precursor of national cinemas in Europe, with primary influence also on the creation of national cinemas in Asia and especially in China.

The Lumière brothers launched cinematography in 1895 with their L'Arrivée d'un train en gare de La Ciotat. By the early 1900s, French cinema led globally, with pioneers like Méliès creating cinematic techniques and the first sci-fi film, A Trip to the Moon (1902). Studios like Pathé and Gaumont dominated, with Alice Guy-Blaché directing hundreds of films. Post-WWI, French cinema declined as U.S. films flooded Europe, leading to import quotas. Between the wars, directors like Jean Renoir, Jean Vigo and Marcel Carné shaped French Poetic Realism. Renoir's La Règle du Jeu (1939) and Carné's Les Enfants du Paradis (1945) remain iconic, showcasing innovation despite war challenges.

From the late 1950s to the 1970s, French cinema flourished with the advent of the New Wave, led by critics-turned-directors like Jean-Luc Godard and François Truffaut, producing groundbreaking films such as Breathless (1960) and The 400 Blows (1959). The movement, which inspired global filmmakers, faded by the late 1960s. Meanwhile, commercial French cinema gained popularity with comedies like La Grande Vadrouille (1966). Stars like Brigitte Bardot, Alain Delon and Catherine Deneuve rose to international fame. Directors like Bertrand Tavernier explored political and artistic themes. By the late 1970s, films like La Cage aux Folles (1978) achieved significant global success.

France was able to produce several major box office successes into the 1990s such as Cyrano de Bergerac (1990), while certain film like La Femme Nikita (1990) and The Fifth Element (1997) reached an international audience.

In 2013, France was the second largest exporter of films in the world after the United States, and a 2014 study showed that French cinema was the most appreciated by global audiences after that of the US. According to industry tracker The Numbers, the fortunes of French film exports have since declined: in 2019, France had fallen to the position of 7th largest exporter by total box office revenue with a 2% share of the global market, and in 2023, 15th by the same metric with a 0.44% share. Overall, France sits fourth on the tracker's all-time box office chart behind the US, UK, and China.

The two most important French film production groups are Pathé and StudioCanal, which are also the two most important groups in Europe.

== History ==
=== Silent era ===
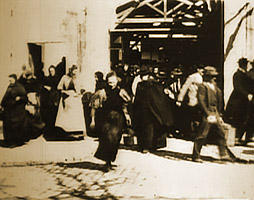
A scene from Louis Lumière's La Sortie des usines Lumière (1895)

Les frères Lumière released the first projection with the Cinematograph, in Paris on 28 December 1895, with first public showing in the Eden Theatre, La Ciotat. The French film industry in the late 19th century and early 20th century was the world's most important. Auguste and Louis Lumière invented the cinématographe and their L'Arrivée d'un train en gare de La Ciotat in Paris in 1895 is considered by many historians as the official birth of cinematography. French films during this period catered to a growing middle class and were mostly shown in cafés and traveling fairs.

The early days of the industry, from 1896 to 1902, saw the dominance of four firms: Pathé Frères, the Gaumont, the Georges Méliès company, and the Lumières. Méliès invented many of the techniques of cinematic grammar, and among his fantastic, surreal short subjects is the first science fiction film A Trip to the Moon (Le Voyage dans la Lune) in 1902.

In 1902, the Lumières abandoned everything but the production of film stock, leaving Méliès as the weakest player of the remaining three. (He would retire in 1914.) From 1904 to 1911, the Pathé Frères company led the world in film production and distribution.

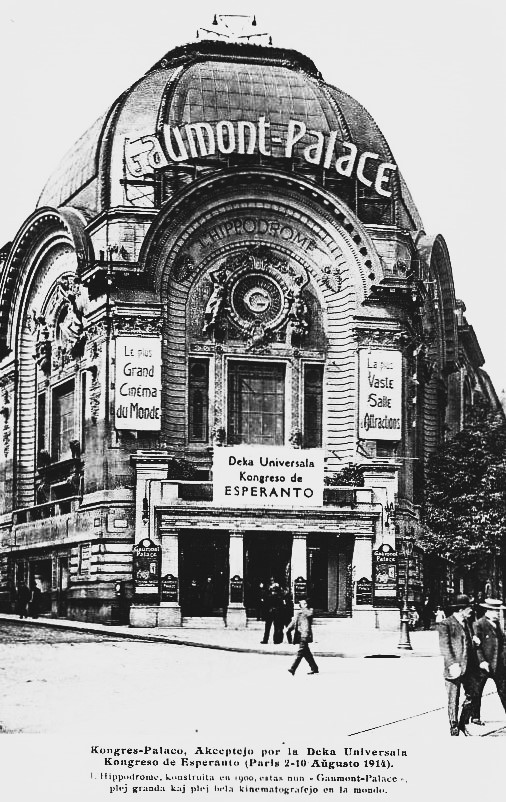
Gaumont palace in Paris, c.1914

At Gaumont, pioneer Alice Guy-Blaché (M. Gaumont's former secretary) was made head of production and oversaw about 400 films, from her first, La Fée aux Choux, in 1896, through 1906. She then continued her career in the United States, as did Maurice Tourneur and Léonce Perret after World War I.

In 1907, Gaumont owned and operated the biggest movie studio in the world, and along with the boom in construction of "luxury cinemas" like the Gaumont-Palace and the Pathé-Palace (both 1911), cinema became an economic challenger to theater by 1914.

=== After World War I ===
After World War I, the French film industry suffered because of a lack of capital, and film production decreased as it did in most other European countries. This allowed the United States film industry to enter the European cinema market, because American films could be sold more cheaply than European productions, since the studios already had recouped their costs in the home market. When film studios in Europe began to fail, many European countries began to set import barriers. France installed an import quota of 1:7, meaning for every seven foreign films imported to France, one French film was to be produced and shown in French cinemas.

During the period between World War I and World War II, Jacques Feyder and Jean Vigo became two of the founders of poetic realism in French cinema. They also dominated French impressionist cinema, along with Abel Gance, Germaine Dulac and Jean Epstein.

In 1931, Marcel Pagnol filmed the first of his great trilogy Marius, Fanny, and César. He followed this with other films including The Baker's Wife. Other notable films of the 1930s included René Clair's Under the Roofs of Paris (1930), Jean Vigo's L'Atalante (1934), Jacques Feyder's Carnival in Flanders (1935), and Julien Duvivier's La belle equipe (1936). In 1935, renowned playwright and actor Sacha Guitry directed his first film and went on to make more than 30 films that were precursors to the New Wave era. In 1937, Jean Renoir, the son of painter Pierre-Auguste Renoir, directed La Grande Illusion (The Grand Illusion). In 1939, Renoir directed La Règle du Jeu (The Rules of the Game). Several critics have cited this film as one of the greatest of all-time, particularly for its innovative camerawork, cinematography and sound editing.

Marcel Carné's Les Enfants du Paradis (Children of Paradise) was filmed during World War II and released in 1945. The three-hour film was extremely difficult to make due to the Nazi occupation. Set in Paris in 1828, it was voted Best French Film of the Century in a poll of 600 French critics and professionals in the late 1990s.

=== Post–World War II ===
==== 1940s–1970s ====
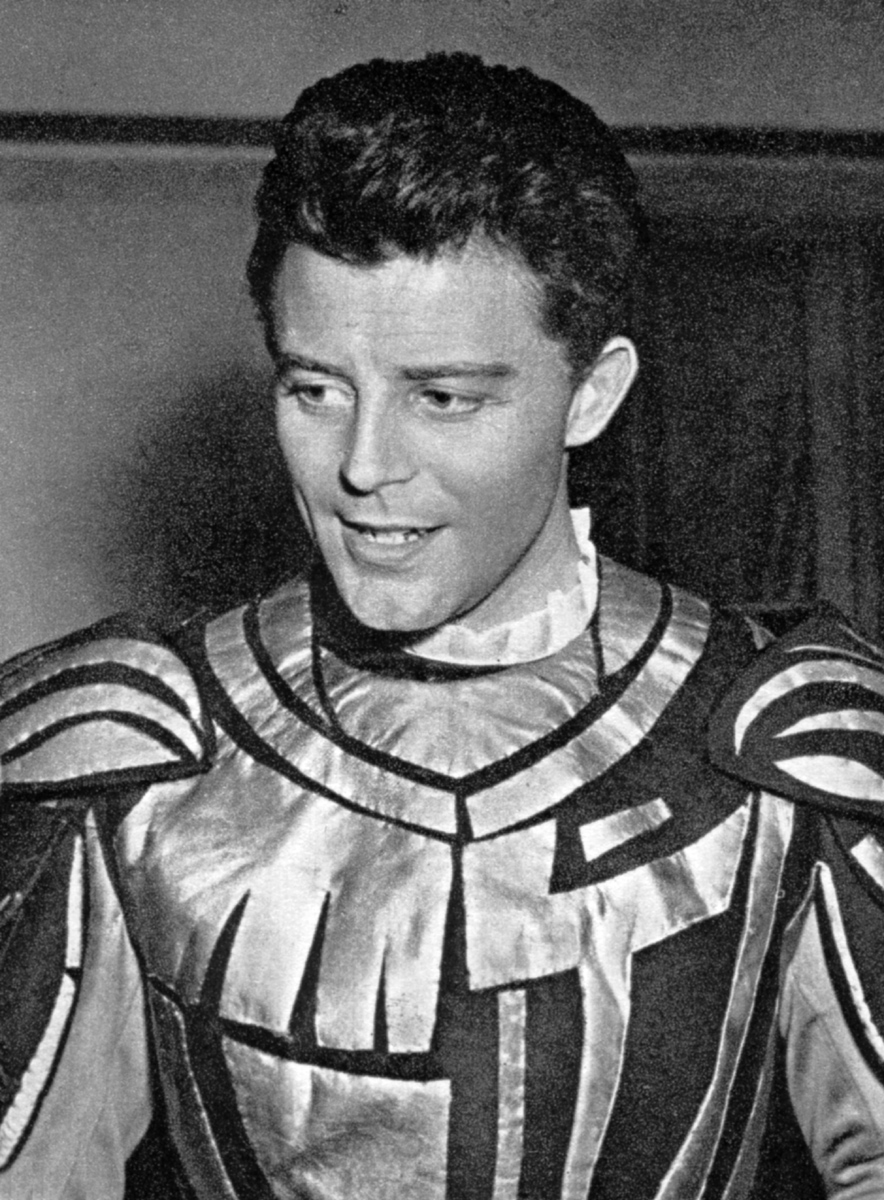
Gerard Philipe Warsaw National Theatre 1954

During the post-War period, one of the most prominent actors was Gérard Philipe, who rose to fame during the later period of the poetic realism movement of French Cinema in the late 1940s. His best-known credits include Such a Pretty Little Beach (1949), Beauty and the Devil (1950), Fanfan La Tulipe (1952), Montparnasse 19 (1958) and Les liaisons dangereuses (1959). During his career in 1940s and 1950s French cinema, he performed with some of the most famous French leading ladies of the era including Jeanne Moreau, Michèle Morgan, Micheline Presle, Danielle Darrieux and Anouk Aimée.

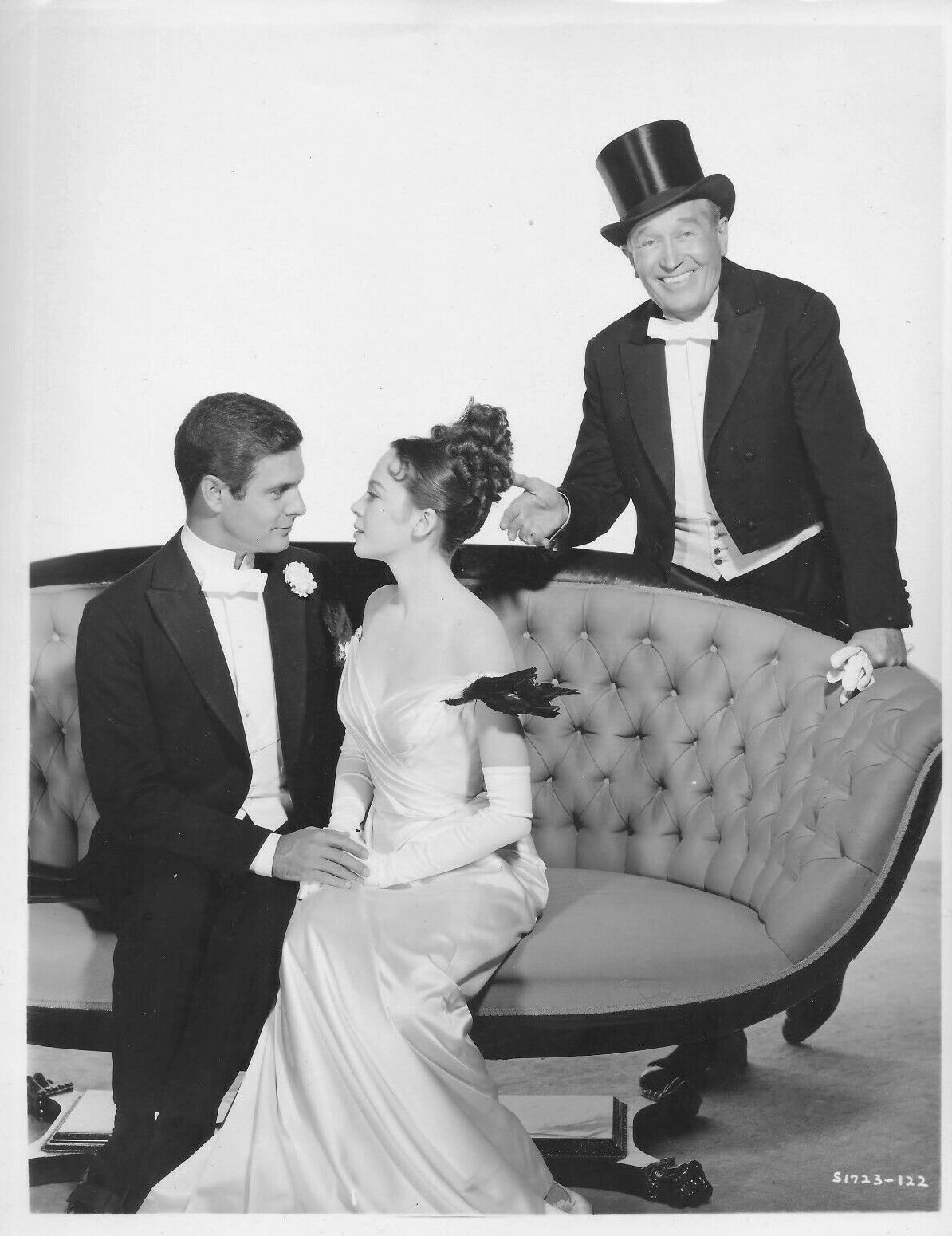
Leslie Caron with Louis Jourdan and Maurice Chevalier on the set of Gigi (1958).

After World War II, the French actress Leslie Caron and the French actor Louis Jourdan enjoyed success in the United States with several musical romantic comedies, notably An American in Paris (1951) and Gigi (1958), based on the 1944 novella of the same name by Colette.

In the magazine Cahiers du cinéma, founded by André Bazin and two other writers in 1951, film critics raised the level of discussion of the cinema, providing a platform for the birth of modern film theory. Several of the Cahiers critics, including Jean-Luc Godard, François Truffaut, Claude Chabrol, Jacques Rivette and Éric Rohmer, went on to make films themselves, creating what was to become known as the French New Wave. Some of the first films of this new movement were Godard's Breathless (À bout de souffle, 1960), starring Jean-Paul Belmondo, Rivette's Paris Belongs to Us (Paris nous appartient, 1958 – distributed in 1961), starring Jean-Claude Brialy and Truffaut's The 400 Blows (Les Quatre Cent Coups, 1959) starring Jean-Pierre Léaud. Later works are Contempt (1963) by Godard starring Brigitte Bardot and Michel Piccoli and Stolen Kisses starring Léaud and Claude Jade. Because Truffaut followed the hero of his screen debut, Antoine Doinel, for twenty years, the last post-New-Wave-film is Love on the Run in which his heroes Antoine (Léaud) and Christine (Jade) get divorced.

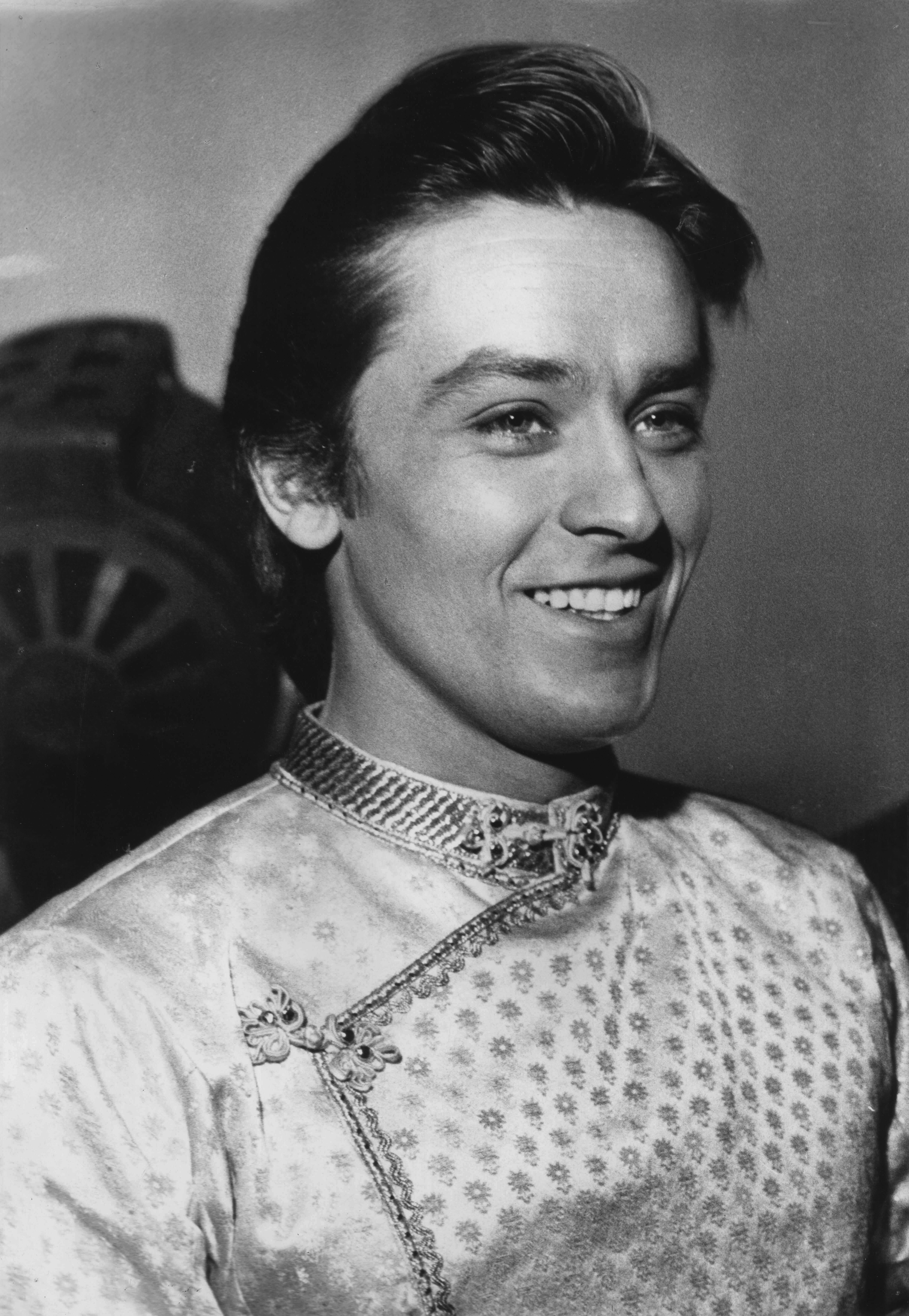
Alain Delon was known as much for his beauty as for his acting career and holds an enduring status as a leading man in French cinema.

Many contemporaries of Godard and Truffaut followed suit, or achieved international critical acclaim with styles of their own, such as the minimalist films of Robert Bresson and Jean-Pierre Melville, the Hitchcockian-like thrillers of Henri-Georges Clouzot, and other New Wave films by Agnès Varda and Alain Resnais. The movement, while an inspiration to other national cinemas and unmistakably a direct influence on the future New Hollywood directors, slowly faded by the end of the 1960s.

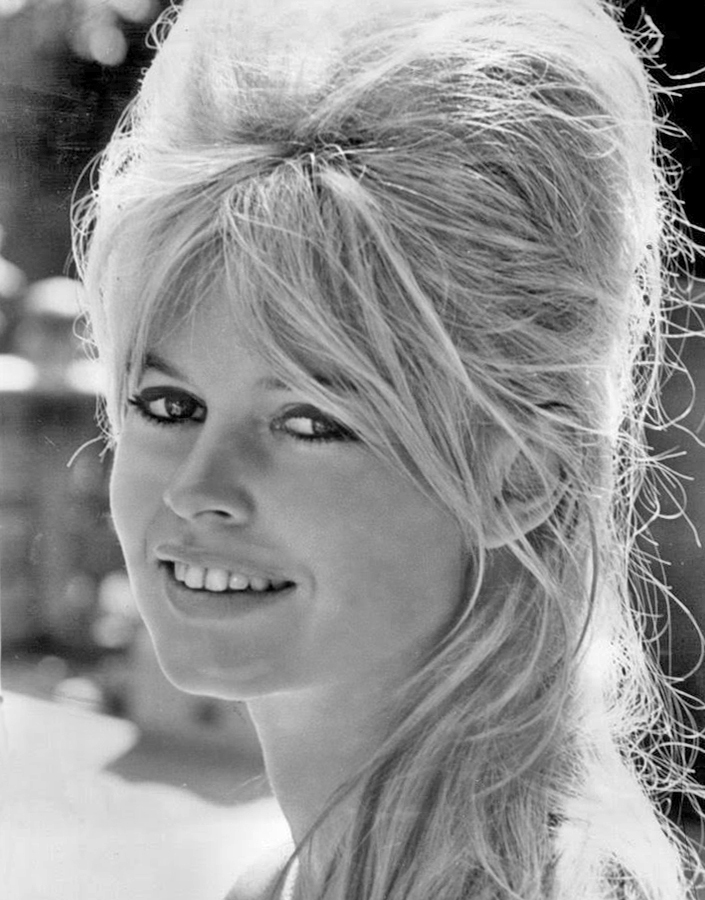
Brigitte Bardot was one of the most famous French actresses in the 1960s.

During this period, French commercial film also made a name for itself. Immensely popular French comedies with Louis de Funès topped the French box office. The war comedy La Grande Vadrouille (1966), from Gérard Oury with Bourvil, de Funès and Terry-Thomas, was the most successful film in French theaters for more than 30 years. Another example was La Folie des grandeurs with Yves Montand. French cinema also was the birthplace for many subgenres of the crime film, most notably the modern caper film, starting with 1955's Rififi by American-born director Jules Dassin and followed by a large number of serious, noirish heist dramas as well as playful caper comedies throughout the sixties, and the "polar," a typical French blend of film noir and detective fiction.

In addition, French movie stars began to claim fame abroad as well as at home. Popular actors of the period included Brigitte Bardot, Alain Delon, Romy Schneider, Catherine Deneuve, Jeanne Moreau, Simone Signoret, Yves Montand, Jean-Paul Belmondo and still Jean Gabin.

Since the Sixties and the early Seventies they are completed and followed by Michel Piccoli and Philippe Noiret as character actors, Annie Girardot, Jean-Louis Trintignant, Jean-Pierre Léaud, Claude Jade, Isabelle Huppert, Anny Duperey, Gérard Depardieu, Patrick Dewaere, Jean-Pierre Cassel, Miou-Miou, Brigitte Fossey, Stéphane Audran and Isabelle Adjani. During the Eightees they are added by a new generation including Sophie Marceau, Emmanuelle Béart, Jean-Hugues Anglade, Sabine Azema, Juliette Binoche and Daniel Auteuil.

In 1968, the May riots shook France. François Truffaut had already organised demonstrations in February against Henri Langlois's removal as head of the Cinémathèque française and dedicated his film Stolen Kisses, which was being made, to Langlois. The Cannes Film Festival is cancelled – on the initiative of Truffaut, Godard and Louis Malle. Jean-Luc Godard no longer works in the commercial film business for years. Political films such as Costa-Gavras' Z celebrate success. Chabrol continues his vivisection of the bourgeoisie (The Unfaithful Wife) and Truffaut explores the possibility of bourgeois marital happiness (Bed and Board). While Godard disappears from cinema after the Nouvelle Vague except for a few essays, Truffaut and Chabrol remain the leading directors whose artistic aspects remain commercially successful. Other directors of the 1970s in this effect are Bertrand Tavernier, Claude Sautet, Eric Rohmer, Claude Lelouch, Georges Lautner, Jean-Paul Rappeneau, Michel Deville Yves Boisset, Maurice Pialat, Bertrand Blier, Coline Serreau and André Téchiné in purely entertainment films, it is Gérard Oury and Édouard Molinaro.

The 1979 film La Cage aux Folles ran for well over a year at the Paris Theatre, an arthouse cinema in New York City, and was a commercial success at theaters throughout the country, in both urban and rural areas. It won the Golden Globe Award for Best Foreign Language Film, and for years it remained the most successful foreign film to be released in the United States.

==== 1980s ====
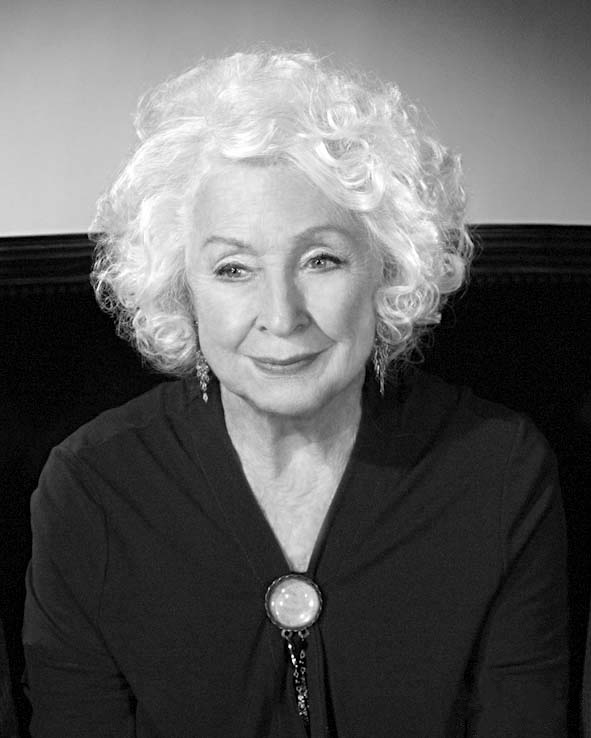
Danielle Darrieux (pictured in 2008) was a French centenarian, who had one of the longest careers in French cinema, spanning eight decades

Jean-Jacques Beineix's Diva (1981) sparked the beginning of the 1980s wave of French cinema. Movies which followed in its wake included Betty Blue (37°2 le matin, 1986) by Beineix, The Big Blue (Le Grand bleu, 1988) by Luc Besson, and The Lovers on the Bridge (Les Amants du Pont-Neuf, 1991) by Léos Carax. Made with a slick commercial style and emphasizing the alienation of their main characters, these films are representative of the style known as Cinema du look.

Camille Claudel, directed by newcomer Bruno Nuytten and starring Isabelle Adjani and Gérard Depardieu, was a major commercial success in 1988, earning Adjani, who was also the film's co-producer, a César Award for best actress. The historical drama film Jean de Florette (1986) and its sequel Manon des Sources (1986) were among the highest grossing French films in history and brought Daniel Auteuil international recognition.

According to Raphaël Bassan, in his article «The Angel: Un météore dans le ciel de l'animation,» La Revue du cinéma, n° 393, avril 1984. (in French), Patrick Bokanowski's The Angel, shown in 1982 at the Cannes Film Festival, can be considered the beginnings of contemporary animation. The masks erase all human personality in the characters. Patrick Bokanowski would thus have total control over the "matter" of the image and its optical composition. This is especially noticeable throughout the film, with images taken through distorted objectives or a plastic work on the sets and costumes, for example in the scene of the designer. Patrick Bokanowski creates his own universe and obeys his own aesthetic logic. It takes us through a series of distorted areas, obscure visions, metamorphoses and synthetic objects. Indeed, in the film, the human may be viewed as a fetish object (for example, the doll hanging by a thread), with reference to Kafkaesque and Freudian theories on automata and the fear of man faced with something as complex as him. The ascent of the stairs would be the liberation of the ideas of death, culture, and sex that makes us reach the emblematic figure of the angel.

==== 1990s ====
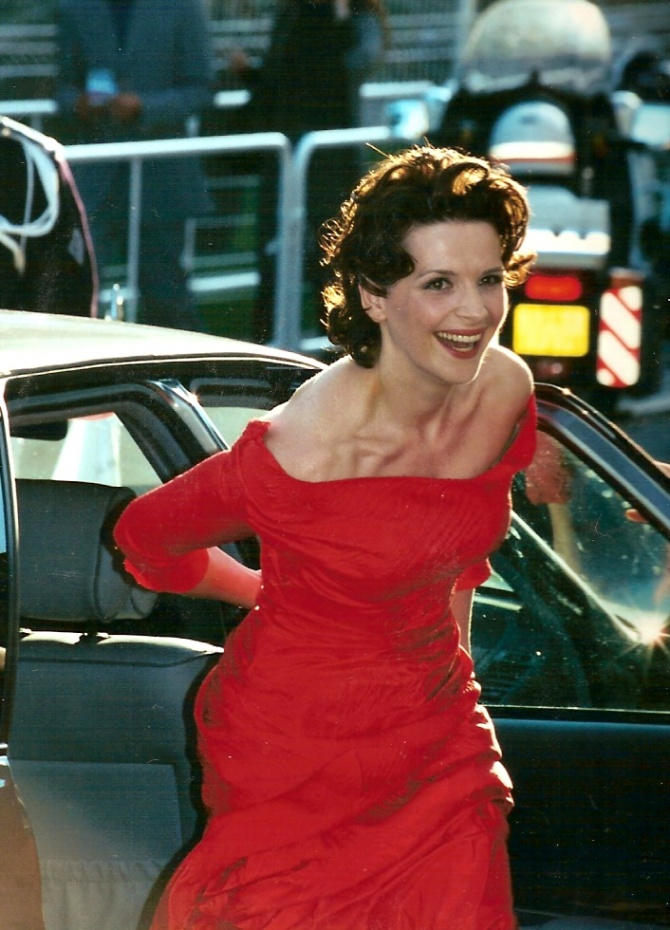
Juliette Binoche at the 2000 Cannes Film Festival

Jean-Paul Rappeneau's Cyrano de Bergerac was a major box-office success in 1990, earning several César Awards, including best actor for Gérard Depardieu, as well as an Academy Award nomination for best foreign picture.

Luc Besson made La Femme Nikita in 1990, a movie that inspired remakes in both United States and in Hong Kong. In 1994, he also made Léon (starring Jean Reno and a young Natalie Portman), and in 1997 The Fifth Element, which became a cult favorite and launched the career of Milla Jovovich.

Jean-Pierre Jeunet made Delicatessen and The City of Lost Children (La Cité des enfants perdus), both of which featured a distinctly fantastical style.

In 1992, Claude Sautet co-wrote (with Jacques Fieschi) and directed Un Coeur en Hiver, considered by many to be a masterpiece. Mathieu Kassovitz's 1995 film Hate (La Haine) received critical praise and made Vincent Cassel a star, and in 1997, Juliette Binoche won the Academy Award for Best Supporting Actress for her role in The English Patient.

The success of Michel Ocelot's Kirikou and the Sorceress in 1998 rejuvenated the production of original feature-length animated films by such filmmakers as Jean-François Laguionie and Sylvain Chomet.

==== 2000s ====
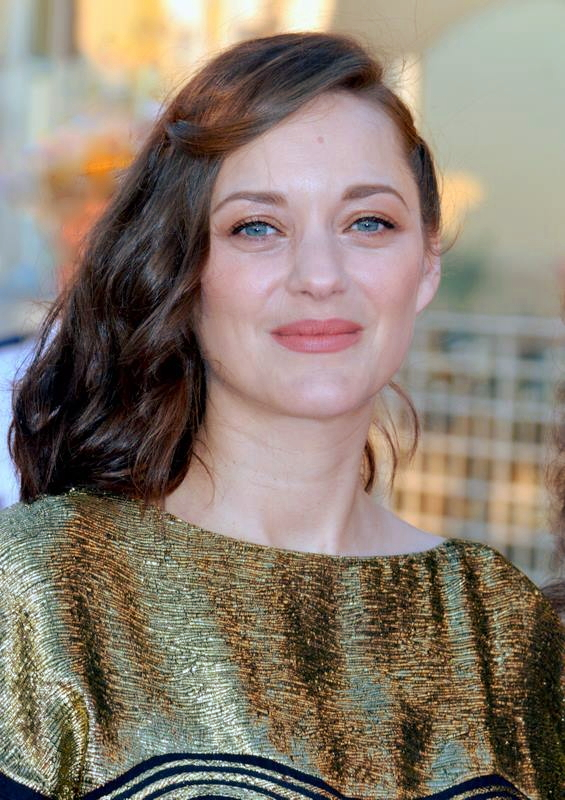
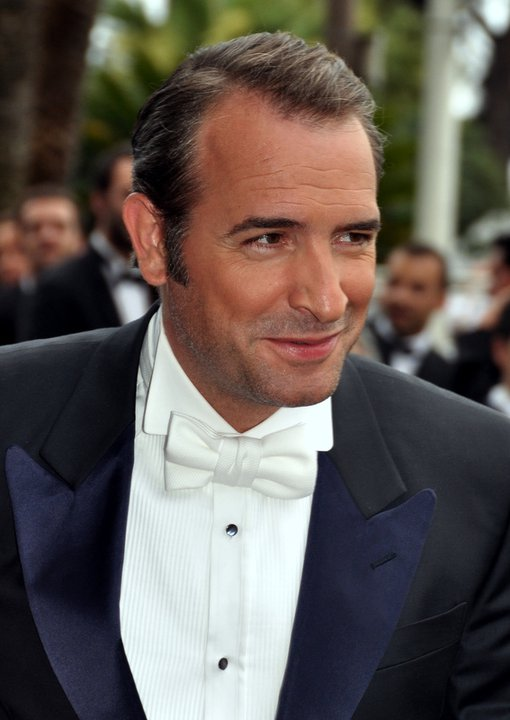
Marion Cotillard (left) and Jean Dujardin (right), both awarded with an Academy Award in United States, for their respective roles in La Vie en Rose (2007) and The Artist (2011).

In 2000, Philippe Binant realized the first digital cinema projection in Europe, with the DLP CINEMA technology developed by Texas Instruments, in Paris.

In 2001, after a brief stint in Hollywood, Jean-Pierre Jeunet returned to France with Amélie (Le Fabuleux Destin d'Amélie Poulain) starring Audrey Tautou. It became the highest-grossing French-language film ever released in the United States. The following year, Brotherhood of the Wolf became the sixth-highest-grossing French-language film of all time in the United States and went on to gross more than $70 million worldwide.

In 2008, Marion Cotillard won the Academy Award for Best Actress and the BAFTA Award for Best Actress in a Leading Role for her portrayal of legendary French singer Édith Piaf in La Vie en Rose, the first French-language performance to be so honored. The film won two Oscars and four BAFTAs and became the third-highest-grossing French-language film in the United States since 1980. Cotillard was the first female and second person to win both an Academy Award and César Award for the same performance.

At the 2008 Cannes Film Festival, Entre les murs (The Class) won the Palme d'Or, the 6th French victory at the festival. The 2000s also saw an increase in the number of individual competitive awards won by French artists at the Cannes Festival, for direction (Tony Gatlif, Exils, 2004), screenplay (Agnès Jaoui and Jean-Pierre Bacri, Look at Me, 2004), female acting (Isabelle Huppert, The Piano Teacher, 2001; Charlotte Gainsbourg, Antichrist, 2009) and male acting (Jamel Debbouze, Samy Naceri, Roschdy Zem, Sami Bouajila and Bernard Blancan, Days of Glory, 2006).

The 2008 rural comedy Bienvenue chez les Ch'tis drew an audience of more than 20 million, the first French film to do so. Its $193 million gross in France puts it just behind Titanic as the most successful film of all time in French theaters.

In the 2000s, several French directors made international productions, often in the action genre. These include Gérard Pirès (Riders, 2002), Pitof (Catwoman, 2004), Jean-François Richet (Assault on Precinct 13, 2005), Florent Emilio Siri (Hostage, 2005), Christophe Gans (Silent Hill, 2006), Mathieu Kassovitz (Babylon A.D., 2008), Louis Leterrier (The Transporter, 2002; Transporter 2, 2005; Olivier Megaton directed Transporter 3, 2008), Alexandre Aja (Mirrors, 2008), and Pierre Morel (Taken, 2009).

Surveying the entire range of French filmmaking today, Tim Palmer calls contemporary cinema in France a kind of eco-system, in which commercial cinema co-exists with artistic radicalism, first-time directors (who make up about 40% of all France's directors each year) mingle with veterans, and there even occasionally emerges a fascinating pop-art hybridity, in which the features of intellectual and mass cinemas are interrelated (as in filmmakers like Valeria Bruni-Tedeschi, Olivier Assayas, Maïwenn, Sophie Fillières, Serge Bozon, and others).

==== 2010s ====
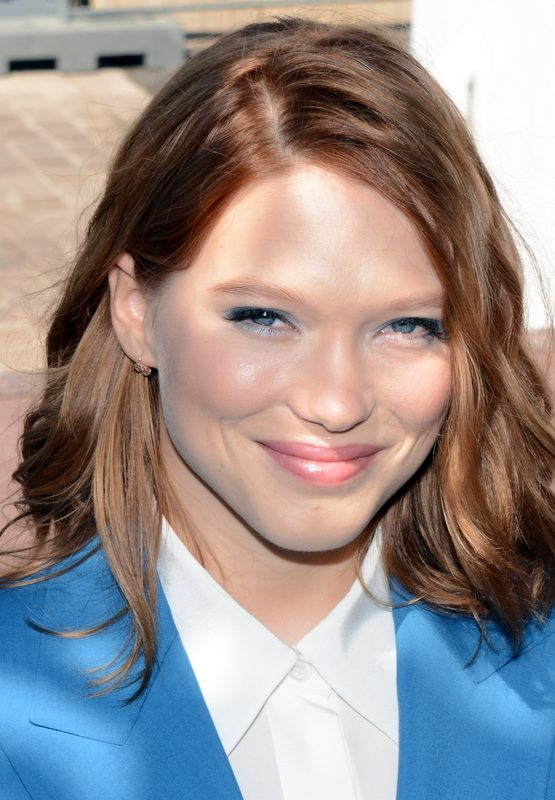
Léa Seydoux at the 2014 Cannes Film Festival.

One of the most noticed and best reviewed films of 2010 was the drama Of Gods and Men (Des hommes et des dieux), about the assassination of seven monks in Tibhirine, Algeria. 2011 saw the release of The Artist, a silent film shot in black and white by Michel Hazanavicius that reflected on the end of Hollywood's silent era.

French cinema continued its upward trend of earning awards at the Cannes Festival, including the prestigious Grand Prix for Of Gods and Men (2010) and the Jury Prize for Poliss (2011); the Best Director Award for Mathieu Amalric (On Tour, 2010); the Best Actress Award for Juliette Binoche (Certified Copy, 2010); and the Best Actor Award for Jean Dujardin (The Artist, 2011).

In 2011, the film The Intouchables became the most watched film in France (including the foreign films). After ten weeks nearly 17.5 million people had seen the film in France, the film was the second most-seen French movie of all time in France, and the third including foreign movies.

In 2012, with 226 million admissions (US$1,900 million) in the world for French films (582 films released in 84 countries), including 82 million admissions in France (US$700 million), 2012 was the fourth best year since 1985. With 144 million admissions outside France (US$1,200 million), 2012 was the best year since at least 1994 (since Unifrance collects data), and the French cinema reached a market share of 2.95% of worldwide admissions and of 4.86% of worldwide sales. Three films particularly contributed to this record year: Taken 2, The Intouchables and The Artist. In 2012, films shot in French ranked 4th in admissions (145 million) behind films shot in English (more than a billion admissions in the US alone), Hindi (?: no accurate data but estimated at 3 billion for the whole India/Indian languages) and Chinese (275 million in China plus a few million abroad), but above films shot in Korean (115 million admissions in South Korea plus a few millions abroad) and Japanese (102 million admissions in Japan plus a few million abroad, a record since 1973 et its 104 million admissions). French-language movies ranked 2nd in export (outside of French-speaking countries) after films in English. 2012 was also the year French animation studio Mac Guff was acquired by an American studio, Universal Pictures, through its Illumination Entertainment subsidiary. Illumination Mac Guff became the animation studio for some of the top English-language animated movies of the 2010s, including The Lorax and the Despicable Me franchise.

In 2015 French cinema sold 106 million tickets and grossed €600 million outside of the country. The highest-grossing film was Taken 3 (€261.7 million) and the largest territory in admissions was China (14.7 million). In that year, France produced more films than any other European country, producing a record-breaking 300 feature-length films. France is one of the few countries where non-American productions have the biggest share; American films only represented 44.9% of total admissions in 2014. This is largely due to the commercial strength of domestic productions.

== French Acting ==
=== 1920s ===
The 1920s marked an important transformation period in the development of french acting styles. This decade saw French performers withdraw from nineteenth century theatrical acting conventions and advance to more expressive and modern acting styles. French cinema was breaking away from the traditional "Cinema of Attractions" and Melodramatic acting seen in earlier periods. This transition marked the start of more naturalistic acting and narrative filmmaking to create a more reality based performance.

These newer films could be described as French Impressionist films due to their acting style and the social climate going on in France at the time. During this time actors and directors collaborated to create depth within the film by their acting, cinematography, and editing styles. The actors could now convey their emotions subtlety but the editing and focus would create a new depiction of the character or scene and help to carry along the narrative. Some examples of these techniques are blurriness of the camera, light or dark lighting, editing cuts, and superimposed images. This foundation led actors to explore subtler characterizations to create a more complex storytelling experience.

During this time, Parisian Avant-garde was paving a new wave of creativity for filmmakers. Avant-garde started in the 1900s and it is the new, experimental ideas that push boundaries in theater and cinema. Figures such as Léger and Duchamp inspired close interplay of directors, actors, and visual artists during this time and placed the actors and directors in a more open environment to experiment with acting styles, complex editing techniques, and eye catching images in the mise en scene. Many directors such as René Clair and Germaine Dulac were heavily influenced by surrealism and pushed their actors to experiment and use stylized emotion and dream like movements to create depth in the shot and the editing. The French Avant-garde reflected and influenced the new open, and unconventional wave of acting and directing.

Theatrical developments were also a big part of the development of French acting styles during this time. During this time, theatrical performances were heavily based on the political climate and reality. This influenced the surrealism and existentialism that we see in many french films during this time. The actors would explore themes of uncertainty and depth to reflect the changing climate in France and attract an audience that understands. There were also feelings of economic and political instability happening all throughout the world at this time. This placed more pressure on france and created a disillusionment that was represented in films and actors performances about the struggles of the people during this time.

== Government support ==
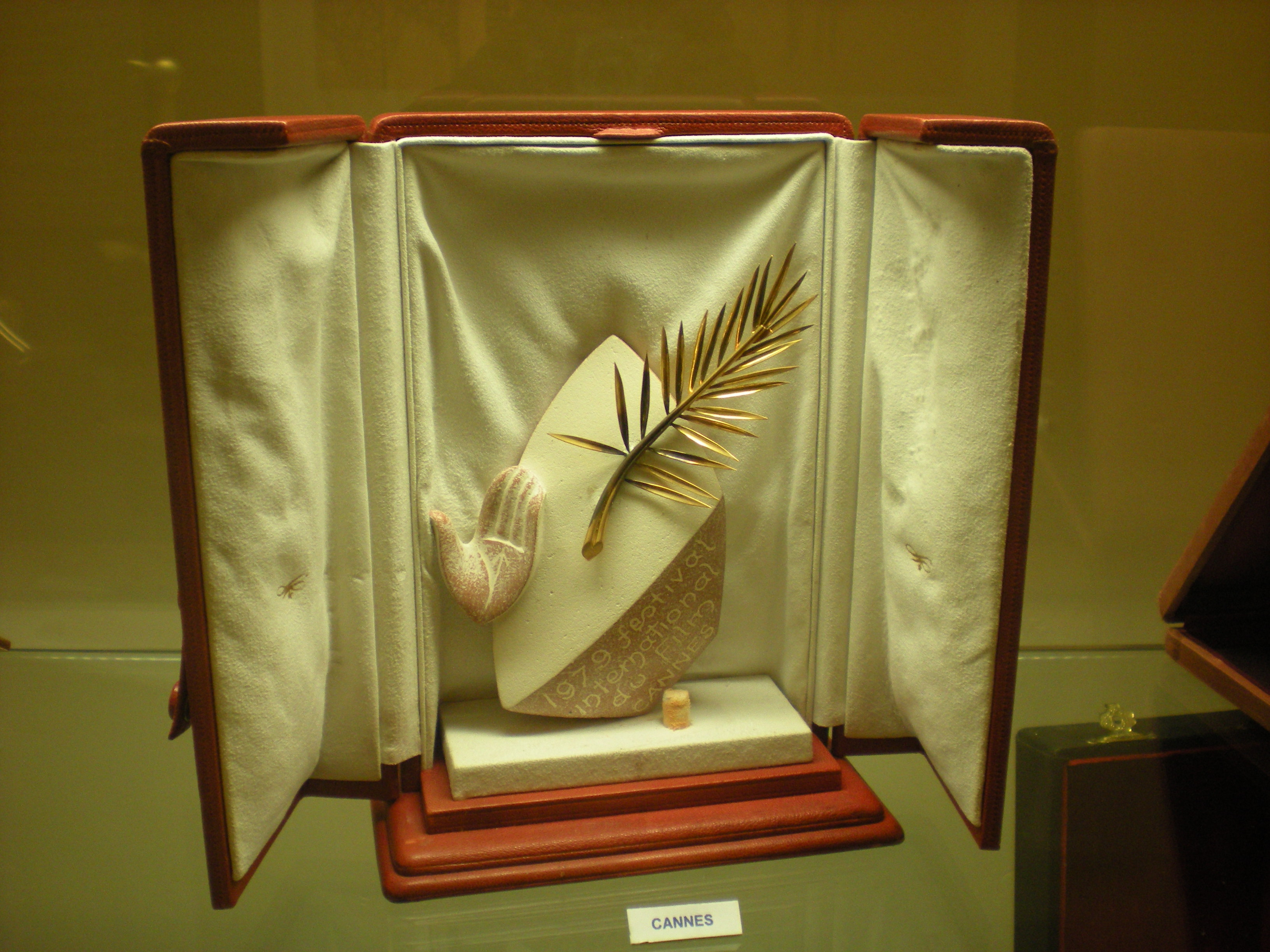
The Palme d'Or ("Golden Palm"), the most prestigious award given out at Cannes Film Festival.

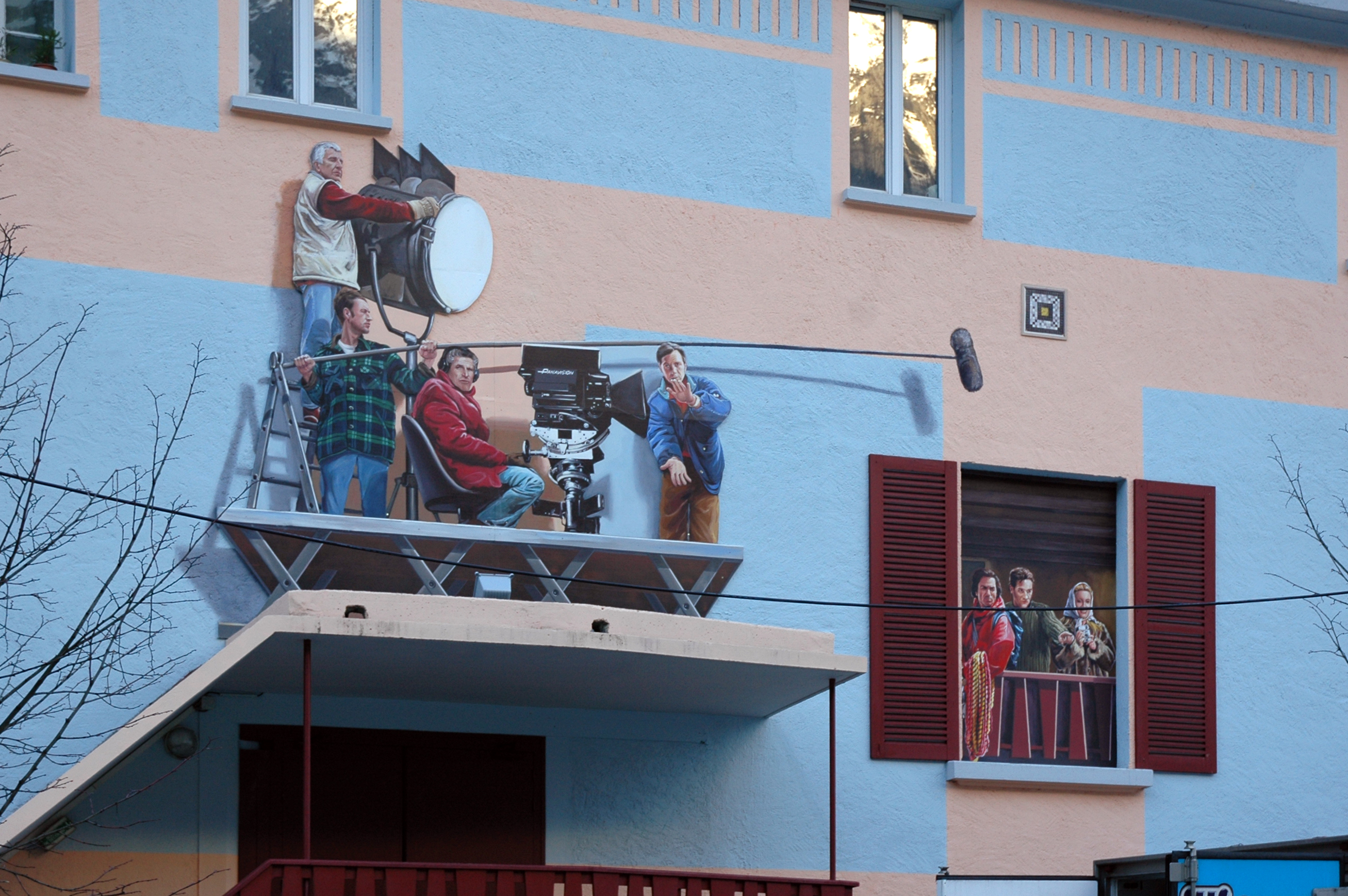
Trompe l'oeil mural on a movie theater in Chamonix

In 2013, France was the second largest exporter of films in the world after the United States, and a 2014 study showed that French cinema was the most appreciated by global audiences after that of the US.

France has had a very strong film industry, due in part to protections afforded by the French Government. The French government has implemented various measures aimed at supporting local film production and movie theaters. Canal+ has a broadcast license requiring it to support the production of movies. Some taxes are levied on movies and TV channels for use as subsidies for movie production.

The French national and regional governments also involve themselves in film production. For example, the award-winning documentary In the Land of the Deaf (Le Pays des sourds), created by Nicolas Philibert in 1992, was co-produced by multinational partners, reducing the financial risks inherent in the project and ensuring enhanced distribution opportunities.

== Movie theaters ==
On 2 February 2000 in Paris, Philippe Binant realized the first digital cinema projection in Europe, with the DLP Cinema technology developed by Texas Instruments.

In 2011 Paris had the highest density of cinemas in the world, measured by the number of movie theaters per inhabitant, In most downtown Paris movie theaters, foreign or arthouse films movies are shown alongside mainstream movies.

Paris also boasts the Cité du cinéma, a major studio north of the city, and Disney Studio, a theme park devoted to the cinema.

== Festivals ==
Name	Est.	City	Type	Details	Website
Amiens International Film Festival	1982	Amiens	Special interest	Annual festival focusing on the cinemas of Europe, Asia and Latin America.	http://www.filmfestamiens.org
Festival du Film Merveilleux	2010	Paris	International	Annual film festival celebrating the imaginary, the Wonder and magic from all over the world.	http://www.festival-film-merveilleux.com/
Annecy International Animated Film Festival	1960	Annecy	Special interest		http://www.annecy.org
Festival du Film Européen Beauvais-Oise	1990	Beauvais	Europe		http://www.beauvaisfilmfest.com
Festival International du Film Ecologique de Bourges	2005	Bourges	Environmental		https://web.archive.org/web/20121109231709/http://www.festival-film-bourges.fr/english/ecological-film-festival.php
Cabestany Short Film Festival	1981	Cabestany	International	Annual short film festival	http://www.courts-metrages.org
Cannes Film Festival	1939	Cannes	International	One of the world's oldest, most influential and prestigious festivals, it is held annually (usually in May) at the Palais des Festivals et des Congrès.	http://www.festival-cannes.com
CineHorizontes – Festival de cinéma espagnol de Marseille	2001	Marseille	Special interest	One of the best Spanish film festivals in France	http://www.cinehorizontes.com
Cinéma du réel – International Documentary Film Festival	1978	Paris	Special interest		http://www.cinereel.org
Créteil International Women's Film Festival	1978	Créteil	Special interest	Showcase of films by female directors.	http://www.filmsdefemmes.com/
Deauville American Film Festival	1975	Deauville	Special interest	Annual festival devoted to American cinema.	http://www.festival-deauville.com/
Deauville Asian Film Festival	1999	Deauville	Special interest	Annual festival devoted to Asian cinema.	http://www.deauvilleasia.com/
ÉCU The European Independent Film festival	2006	Paris	Special Interest	Annual festival devoted to independent cinema .	http://www.ecufilmfestival.com/
Fantastique semaine du cinéma	2010	Nice	International	Annual festival devoted to horror and fantastic cinema (Festival du Film Fantastique) cinema	http://www.cinenasty.com/
Hallucinations Collectives	2008	Lyon	Special interest	Annual festival devoted to Horror, fantastic, strange and cult cinema.	http://www.hallucinations-collectives.com
Fantastic'Arts	1994	Gérardmer	Special interest	Annual festival devoted to horror and fantastic cinema (Festival du Film Fantastique) cinema	http://www.gerardmer-fantasticart.com/
Festival du Film Polonais Cat.Studios	2007	Perpignan	Special interest	Annual festival devoted to Polish cinema.	http://www.catstudios.net
Festival du Film Web		Oloron-Sainte-Marie	Special interest		
Fantasy film festival	2017	Menton	Special interest	Annual festival devoted to Sci-FI and fantastic cinema (Festival international du Film Fantastique de Menton) cinema	https://www.festival-film-fantastique.com/
Festival International du Film de Montagne	1984	Autrans	Mountain film	first week in December	http://www.festival-autrans.com
Festival Pocket Film		Paris	Special interest	Mobile phone film festival.	https://web.archive.org/web/20191112050323/http://www.festivalpocketfilms.fr/
Festival international du film des droits de l'homme de Paris	2003	Paris	International	Features and shorts documentaries on human rights issues. Once a year, in February or March. Also present in other cities in France.	http://www.festival-droitsdelhomme.org/paris/
International Festival of Audiovisual Programs		Biarritz	Special interest		https://web.archive.org/web/20060701172343/http://www.fipa.tm.fr/
International student short-film festival of Cergy-Pontoise	1991	Cergy-Pontoise	International	Student Festival	http://lefestivalducourt.org/
Les Arcs Film Festival	2009	Bourg-Saint-Maurice	European	Held in December	https://lesarcs-filmfest.com/fr
Marseille Film Festival	1989	Marseille	International	Held in July	http://www.fidmarseille.org/
NollywoodWeek Paris	2013	Paris	Special Interest	Annual festival in late May showcasing the top new films from Nigerian filmmakers and Nollywood	http://www.nollywoodweek.com/
Festival du Cinéma européen de Lille	1984	Lille	Special interest	European short movies competition	https://eurofilmfest-lille.com/
Paris Film Festival	2003	Paris	International	Annual festival held in between June and July.	http://www.pariscinema.org/
Premiers Plans		Angers	Special interest	Showcase of European directorial debut films.	http://www.premiersplans.org/
Three Continents Festival	1979	Nantes	Special interest	Annual festival is devoted to the cinemas of Asia, Africa and Latin America.	http://www.3continents.com
Tréguier International Film Festival	2009	Tréguier	International	Annual festival held in July. Open to all filmmakers.	http://www.treguierfilmfest.com
Utopiales – Nantes International Science-Fiction Festival	1998	Nantes	Special interest	Annual sci-fi festival.	http://www.utopiales.org/
European Student Film Festival	2006	Paris	International	Has competition, November 14 to 18, 2012	http://www.esff.org/
Toulouse Indian Film Festival	2013	Toulouse	India and Indian subcontinent	Has competition, Annual April 22 to 26, 2020	http://www.ffif.fr/

== Film distribution and production companies ==
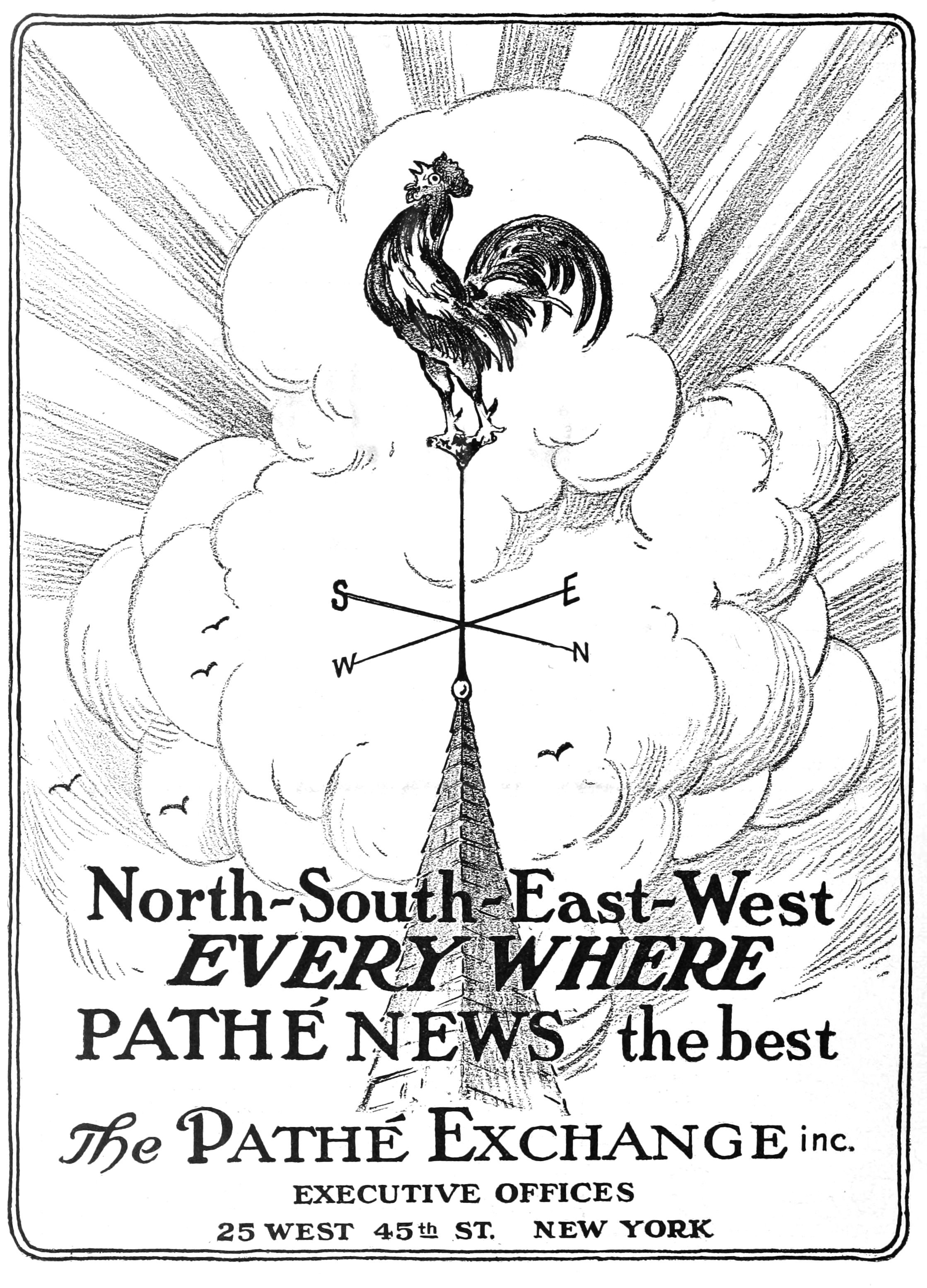
Poster for Pathé News, c.1915

Notable French film distribution and/or production companies include:

- Ad Vitam
- Alfama Films
- ARP Sélection
- BAC Films
- Diaphana Films
- EuropaCorp
- Gaumont
- Haut et Court
- KMBO
- Le Pacte
- Les Films du Losange
- Mars Films
- MK2
- Pan-Européenne
- Pathé
- Pyramide Distribution
- Rezo Films
- SND Films
- StudioCanal
- UGC
- Wild Bunch

== Allegations of sex abuse and coverups ==
In February 2024, French actress and director Judith Godrèche called for the French film industry to "face the truth" on sexual violence and physical abuse during an appearance she made during the live broadcast of the 2024 Cesar Awards ceremony. Shortly before this, Godrèche claimed that she was sexually abused by prominent French directors Benoit Jacquot and Jacques Doillon. In May 2024, the French parliament launched a Commission to investigate reports of sex abuse in the French film industry. In July 2024, in the wake of the investigation, and later rape charge, against Jacquot for separate sex abuse allegations, it was reported that several men in the French filmmaking industry were facing a flurry of sex abuse allegations. It was also alleged that the industry provided a cover for abuse.

== See also ==
- List of French actors
- List of French directors
- List of French-language films
- French comedy films
- List of highest-grossing films in France
- French film awards
- Cinema of the world
