= 1982 Cannes Film Festival =

- Official poster of the 35th Cannes Film Festival, adapted from an original drawing by Italian film director Federico Fellini.
- Opening film: Intolerance (1916)
- Closing film: E.T. the Extra-Terrestrial
- Location: Cannes, France
- Founded: 1946
- Awards: Palme d'Or: Missing; Yol
- No. of films: 22 (In Competition)
- Festival date: 14 May 1982 – 26 May 1982
- Website: festival-cannes.com/en

Cannes Film Festival
- 1983 1981

The 35th Cannes Film Festival took place from 14 to 26 May 1982. Italian opera and theatre director Giorgio Strehler served as jury president for the main competition.

The Palme d'Or, the festival's top prize, was jointly awarded to Missing by Costa-Gavras and Yol by Yılmaz Güney and Şerif Gören.

The festival opened with the 1916 film Intolerance by D. W. Griffith, and closed with E.T. the Extra-Terrestrial by Steven Spielberg.

== Juries ==
=== In Competition ===
- Giorgio Strehler, Italian opera and theatre director - Jury President
- Jean-Jacques Annaud, French filmmaker and producer
- Suso Cecchi d'Amico, Italian writer
- Geraldine Chaplin, American actress
- Gabriel García Márquez, Colombian author
- Florian Hopf, West-German
- Sidney Lumet, American filmmaker
- Mrinal Sen, Indian filmmaker
- Claude Soulé, French CST official
- René Thévenet, French producer

== Official selection ==
=== In Competition ===
The following feature films competed for the Palme d'Or:

English title	Original title	Director(s)	Production country
À toute allure		Robert Kramer	France
Another Way	Egymásra nézve	Károly Makk	Hungary
Britannia Hospital		Lindsay Anderson	United Kingdom
Cecilia		Humberto Solás	Cuba
Day of the Idiots	Tag der Idioten	Werner Schroeter	West Germany
Fitzcarraldo		Werner Herzog	West Germany, Peru
Hammett		Wim Wenders	United States
Identification of a Woman	Identificazione di una donna	Michelangelo Antonioni	Italy
A Ilha dos Amores	恋の浮島	Paulo Rocha	Portugal, Japan
Invitation au voyage		Peter Del Monte	France, Italy, West Germany
Missing		Costa-Gavras	United States
Moonlighting		Jerzy Skolimowski	United Kingdom
The Night of the Shooting Stars	La Notte di San Lorenzo	Paolo and Vittorio Taviani	Italy
Passion		Jean-Luc Godard	Switzerland, France
The Return of the Soldier		Alan Bridges	United Kingdom
Sandstorm	رياح رملية	Mohammed Lakhdar-Hamina	Algeria
Shoot the Moon		Alan Parker	United States
Smithereens		Susan Seidelman	United States
Sweet Inquest on Violence	Douce enquête sur la violence	Gérard Guérin	France
That Night in Varennes	La Nuit de Varennes	Ettore Scola	France, Italy
The True Story of Ah Q	阿Q正传	Fan Cen	China
Yol		Yılmaz Güney & Şerif Gören	Turkey, Switzerland, France

=== Un Certain Regard ===
The following films were selected for the Un Certain Regard section:

English title	Original title	Director(s)	Production country
Elia Kazan, Outsider		Annie Tresgot	France
Elippathayam		Adoor Gopalakrishnan	India
Five and the Skin	Cinq et la peau	Pierre Rissient	France
Forty Deuce		Paul Morrissey	United States
A Girl's Tears	O lacrimă de fată	Iosif Demian	Romania
Heart and Guts	Das Tripas Coração	Ana Carolina	Brazil
A Letter to Freddy Buache	Lettre à Freddy Buache	Jean-Luc Godard	France
Little Wars	حروب صغيرة	Maroun Bagdadi	France, Lebanon
Monkey Grip		Ken Cameron	Australia
Roza		Hristoforos Hristofis	Greece
See You in the Next War	Довиђења у следећем рату	Živojin Pavlović	Yugoslavia
Tree of Knowledge	Kundskabens træ	Nils Malmros	Denmark
The Wind	Finye	Souleymane Cissé	Mali
Une villa aux environs de New York		Benoît Jacquot	France

=== Out of Competition ===
The following films were selected to be screened out of competition:

English title	Original title	Director(s)	Production country
Bonjour Mr. Lewis		Robert Benayoun	France
Brel		Frédéric Rossif	France
Chronopolis		Piotr Kamler	France, Poland
E.T. the Extra-Terrestrial (closing film)		Steven Spielberg	United States
The Evil Dead		Sam Raimi	United States
Intolerance (1916) (opening film)		D. W. Griffith	United States
The Mystery of Picasso	Le mystère Picasso	Henri-Georges Clouzot	France
Parsifal		Hans-Jürgen Syberberg	West Germany, France
Pink Floyd – The Wall		Alan Parker	United Kingdom

=== Short Films Competition ===
The following short films competed for the Short Film Palme d'Or:

- Bumerang by Zsuzsanna Zsáky
- The Cooler by Lol Creme and Kevin Godley
- Elsa by Marja Pensala
- Meow by Marcos Magalhães
- Merlin ou le cours de l'or by Arthur Joffé
- Sans préavis by Michel Gauthier
- Szarnyaslenyek boltja by Laszlo Halmai
- Ted Baryluk's Grocery by John Paskievich, Mike Mirus

== Parallel sections ==
=== International Critics' Week ===
The following feature films were screened for the 21st International Critics' Week (21e Semaine de la Critique):

- The Angel by Patrick Bokanowski (France)
- Czułe miejsca (Des points sensibles) by Piotr Andrejew (Poland)
- Dhil al ardh (L'Ombre de la terre) by Taieb Louhichi (Tunisia, France)
- Half a Life (Mourir à trente ans) by Romain Goupil (France)
- Jom by Ababacar Samb-Makharam (Senegal)
- The Painter by Güran Du Rees and Christina Olofson (Sweden)
- Parti sans laisser d'adresse by Jacqueline Veuve (Switzerland)

=== Directors' Fortnight ===
The following films were screened for the 1982 Directors' Fortnight (Quinzaine des Réalizateurs):

- Arais Min Kassab by Jillali Ferhati
- At by Ali Ozgentürk
- Batch '81 by Mike De Leon
- Bolivar, Sinfonia Tropical by Diego Risquez
- Daimler-Benz Limousine (Limuzyna Daimler-Benz) by Filip Bajon
- Dakhal by Goutam Ghose
- Falensterul by Savel Stiopul
- La Familia Orozco by Jorge Reyes
- Heatwave by Philip Noyce
- India, Daughter of the Sun (India, A Filha do Sol) by Fabio Barreto
- Kaliyugaya by Lester James Peries
- Kisapmata by Mike De Leon
- Les Papiers d'Aspern by Eduardo de Gregorio
- The Scarecrow by Sam Pillsbury
- Sekka Tomurai Zashi by Yoichi Takabayashi
- The Story Of Woo Viet by Ann Hui
- Time Stands Still (Megáll az idő) by Peter Gothar
- Too Far to Go by Fielder Cook
- La vela incantata by Gianfranco Mingozzi
- Wild Flowers (Les fleurs sauvages) by Jean Pierre Lefebvre

Short films

- Bogus by Ghislain Honoré, Jacques Lizzi
- Carry On Britannia by Stuart Rumens
- Coeurs Marins by Carlos Pedro de Andrade Jr
- Faces by (director not stated)
- Gratia Plena by (director not stated)
- Sopa de Pollo de Mama by Carlos Castillo

== Official Awards ==
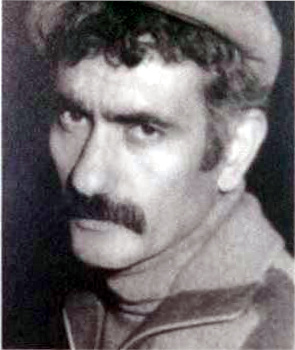
Kurdish director Yılmaz Güney, co-winner of the 1982 Palme d'Or

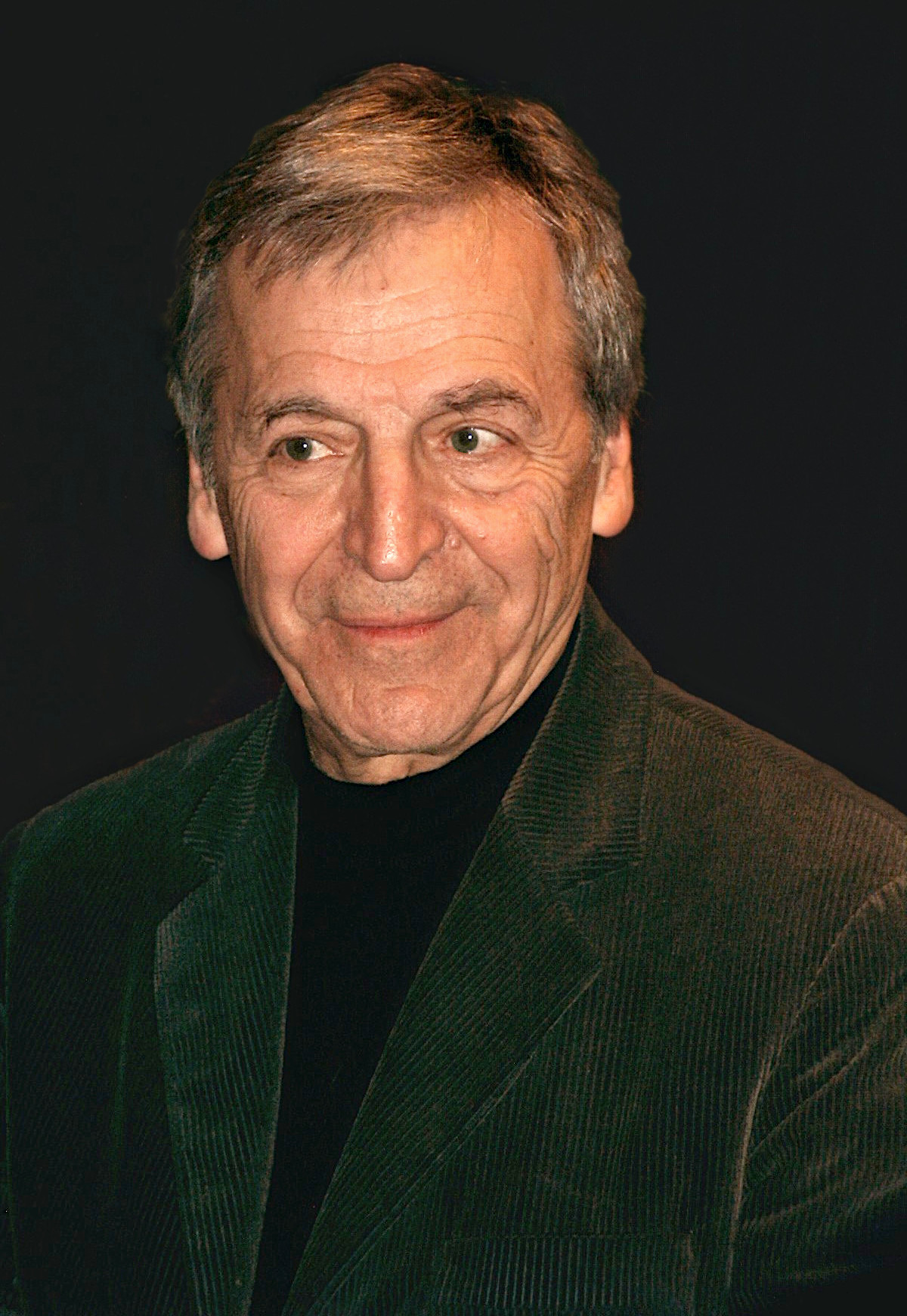
Greek director Costa Gavras, co-winner of the 1982 Palme d'Or

=== In Competition ===
- Palme d'Or:
  - Missing by Costa Gavras
  - Yol by Yılmaz Güney and Şerif Gören
- Grand Prix: The Night of the Shooting Stars by Paolo and Vittorio Taviani
- Best Director: Werner Herzog for Fitzcarraldo
- Best Screenplay: Jerzy Skolimowski for Moonlighting
- Best Actress: Jadwiga Jankowska-Cieślak for Another Way
- Best Actor: Jack Lemmon for Missing
- Best Artistic Contribution: Bruno Nuytten (cinematographer) for Invitation au voyage
- 35th Anniversary Prize: Identification of a Woman by Michelangelo Antonioni
- Honorary Award: Hommage à Satyajit Ray

=== Caméra d'Or ===
- Half a Life by Romain Goupil

=== Short Film Palme d'Or ===
- Merlin ou le cours de l'or by Arthur Joffé
- Jury Prize: Meow by Marcos Magalhães

== Independent Awards ==
=== FIPRESCI Prizes ===
- Yol by Yılmaz Güney and Şerif Gören
- Another Way by Károly Makk
- Wild Flowers by Jean Pierre Lefebvre (Directors' Fortnight)

=== Commission Supérieure Technique ===
- Technical Grand Prize: Raoul Coutard (cinematographer) for Passion

=== Prize of the Ecumenical Jury ===
- The Night of the Shooting Stars by Paolo and Vittorio Taviani
  - Special Mention:
    - Shadow of the Earth by Taieb Louhichi
    - Yol by Yılmaz Güney and Şerif Gören

=== Award of the Youth ===
- Foreign Film: Time Stands Still by Péter Gothár
- French Film: Half a Life by Romain Goupil

== Media ==
- INA: Opening ceremony of the 1982 Festival (commentary in French)
