= The Woman Who Powders Herself =

- A still from the film depicting a sphinx in a barren wasteland
- French: La Femme qui se poudre
- Directed by: Patrick Bokanowski
- Written by: Patrick Bokanowski
- Produced by: Patrick Bokanowski
- Starring: Claus-Dieter Reents; Jean-Jacques Choul; Nadine Roussial; Jacques Delbosc d'Auzon
- Cinematography: Daniel Bard
- Edited by: Patrick Bokanowski; Renée Richard
- Music by: Michèle Bokanowski
- Production company: Kira B.M. Films
- Release date: 1972
- Running time: 18 minutes
- Country: France
- Language: French

The Woman Who Powders Herself (French: La Femme qui se poudre) is a 1972 French black-and-white experimental horror short film written, produced, and directed by Patrick Bokanowski. The short film, which contains no dialogue, follows a cast of masked figures (similar to those of Bokanowski's later 1982 feature film L'Ange) engaging in a series of outlandish acts.

== Synopsis ==
A group of uncanny figures wearing crude, disfigured masks are portrayed occupying themselves with a variety of unconnected tasks, set to an unsettling film score. One of the figures is seen removing pieces of cloth from a well whilst a scarecrow mocks them. Another—the titular character—applies makeup to her "face" as she prepares to go out with an accompanying figure. A figure exits their house and wanders a vast wasteland as an arabesque song plays, encountering an ancient Egyptian style sphinx statue. Two figures accompany each other, one lying on their deathbed. A physical altercation occurs between a gathering of figures at a dinner table.

== Film print ==
The short film's original 35 mm print was purchased by the Centre Pompidou in 1993, and is currently stored in Level 4 of its Musée National d'Art Moderne.

== See also ==
- The Angel (1982 film)
