= New York Film Critics Circle Award for Best Foreign Language Film =

Film award

The New York Film Critics Circle Award for Best Foreign Language Film is one of the annual awards given by the New York Film Critics Circle.

== Winners ==
=== 1930s ===
Year	English title	Original title	Director(s)	Country
1937	Mayerling		Anatole Litvak	France
1938	Grand Illusion	La Grande Illusion	Jean Renoir	France
1939	Harvest	Regain	Marcel Pagnol	France

=== 1940s ===
Year	English title	Original title	Director(s)	Country
1940	The Baker's Wife	La femme du boulanger	Marcel Pagnol	France
1946	Rome, Open City	Roma città aperta	Roberto Rossellini	Italy
1947	To Live in Peace	Vivere in pace	Luigi Zampa	Italy
1948	Paisan	Paisà	Roberto Rossellini	Italy
1949	Bicycle Thieves	Ladri di biciclette	Vittorio De Sica	Italy

=== 1950s ===
Year	English title	Original title	Director(s)	Country
1950	L'Amore		Roberto Rossellini	Italy
1951	Miracle in Milan	Miracolo a Milano	Vittorio De Sica	Italy
1952	Forbidden Games	Jeux interdits	René Clément	France
1953	Justice Is Done	Justice est faite	André Cayatte	France
1954	Gate of Hell	地獄門	Teinosuke Kinugasa	Japan
1955	Umberto D.		Vittorio De Sica	Italy
1956	The Road	La Strada	Federico Fellini	Italy
1957	Gervaise		René Clément	France
1958	My Uncle	Mon Oncle	Jacques Tati	France
1959	The 400 Blows	Les Quatre Cents Coups	François Truffaut	France

=== 1960s ===
Year	English title	Original title	Director(s)	Country
1960	Hiroshima My Love	Hiroshima mon amour	Alain Resnais	France
1961	The Sweet Life	La Dolce Vita	Federico Fellini	Italy
1963	8½	Otto e mezzo	Federico Fellini	Italy
1964	That Man from Rio	L'homme de Rio	Philippe de Broca	France
1965	Juliet of the Spirits	Giulietta degli spiriti	Federico Fellini	Italy
1966	The Shop on Main Street	Obchod na korze	Ján Kadár and Elmar Klos	Czechoslovakia
1967	The War Is Over	La guerre est finie	Alain Resnais	France
1968	War and Peace	Война и мир	Sergei Bondarchuk	Soviet Union

=== 1970s ===
Year	English title	Original title	Director(s)	Country
1978	Bread and Chocolate	Pane e cioccolata	Franco Brusati	Italy
1979	The Tree with the Wooden Clogs	L'albero degli zoccoli	Ermanno Olmi	France, Italy

=== 1980s ===
Year	English title	Original title	Director(s)	Country
1980	My American Uncle	Mon oncle d'Amérique	Alain Resnais	France
1981	Pixote	Pixote: A lei do mais fraco	Hector Babenco	Brazil
1982	Time Stands Still	Megáll az idö	Péter Gothár	Hungary
1983	Fanny and Alexander	Fanny och Alexander	Ingmar Bergman	Sweden
1984	A Sunday in the Country	Un dimanche à la campagne	Bertrand Tavernier	France
1985	Ran	乱	Akira Kurosawa	Japan, France
1986	The Decline of the American Empire	Le déclin de l'empire américain	Denys Arcand	Canada
1987	My Life as a Dog	Mitt liv som hund	Lasse Hallström	Sweden
1988	Women on the Verge of a Nervous Breakdown	Mujeres al borde de un ataque de nervios	Pedro Almodóvar	Spain
1989	Story of Women	Une affaire de femmes	Claude Chabrol	France

=== 1990s ===
Year	English title	Original title	Director(s)	Country
1990	The Nasty Girl	Das Schreckliche Mädchen	Michael Verhoeven	West Germany
1991	Europa Europa	Hitlerjunge Salomon	Agnieszka Holland	Germany
1992	Raise the Red Lantern	大紅燈籠高高掛	Zhang Yimou	China, Hong Kong, Taiwan
1993	Farewell My Concubine	霸王別姬	Chen Kaige	China/Hong Kong
1994	Three Colours: Red	Trois couleurs: Rouge	Krzysztof Kieślowski	France/Poland/Switzerland
1995	Wild Reeds	Les Roseaux sauvages	André Téchiné	France
1996	The White Balloon	بادکنک سفيد	Jafar Panahi	Iran
1997	Ponette		Jacques Doillon	France
1998	The Celebration	Festen	Thomas Vinterberg	Denmark
1999	All About My Mother	Todo sobre mi madre	Pedro Almodóvar	Spain

=== 2000s ===
Year	English title	Original title	Director(s)	Country
2000	Yi Yi	一一	Edward Yang	Japan, Taiwan
2001	In the Mood for Love	花樣年華	Wong Kar-wai	France, Hong Kong
2002	And Your Mother Too	Y Tu Mamá También	Alfonso Cuarón	Mexico
2003	City of God	Cidade de Deus	Fernando Meirelles	Brazil
2004	Bad Education	La mala educación	Pedro Almodóvar	Spain
2005	2046		Wong Kar-wai	China, Hong Kong
2006	Army of Shadows	L'armée des ombres	Jean-Pierre Melville	France, Italy
2007	The Lives of Others	Das Leben der Anderen	Florian Henckel von Donnersmarck	Germany
2008	4 Months, 3 Weeks and 2 Days	4 luni, 3 săptămâni şi 2 zile	Cristian Mungiu	Romania
2009	Summer Hours	L'Heure d'été	Olivier Assayas	France

=== 2010s ===
Year	English title	Original title	Director(s)	Country
2010	Carlos		Olivier Assayas	France, Germany
2011	A Separation	جدایی نادر از سیمین	Asghar Farhadi	Iran
2012	Amour		Michael Haneke	Austria, France, Germany
2013	Blue Is the Warmest Colour	La Vie d'Adèle – Chapitres 1 & 2	Abdellatif Kechiche	France
2014	Ida		Paweł Pawlikowski	Poland
2015	Timbuktu		Abderrahmane Sissako	Mauritania
2016	Toni Erdmann		Maren Ade	Germany
2017	BPM (Beats per Minute)	120 BPM (Beats per Minute)	Robin Campillo	France
2018	Cold War	Zimna Wojna	Paweł Pawlikowski	Poland
2019	Parasite	기생충	Bong Joon-ho	South Korea

=== 2020s ===
Year	English title	Original title	Director(s)	Country
2020	Bacurau		Kleber Mendonça Filho; Juliano Dornelles	Brazil
2021	The Worst Person in the World	Verdens verste menneske	Joachim Trier	Norway
2022	EO	Io	Jerzy Skolimowski	Poland
2023	Anatomy of a Fall	Anatomie d'une chute	Justine Triet	France
2024	All We Imagine as Light	പ്രഭയായ് നിനച്ചതെല്ലാം	Payal Kapadia	India
2025	The Secret Agent	O Agente Secreto	Kleber Mendonça Filho	Brazil

== Multiple winners ==
10 directors have won the award multiple times.

Wins	Director
4	Federico Fellini
3	Pedro Almodóvar
3	Vittorio De Sica
3	Alain Resnais
3	Roberto Rossellini
2	Olivier Assayas
2	René Clément
2	Kleber Mendonça Filho
2	Marcel Pagnol
2	Paweł Pawlikowski
2	Wong Kar-wai

== See also ==
- Golden Globe for Best Foreign Language Film
- Independent Spirit Award for Best International Film
- World cinema
