= Time Stands Still (film) =

1982 film by Péter Gothár

- Directed by: Péter Gothár
- Written by: Péter Gothár; Géza Bereményi
- Starring: Anikó Iván; István Znamenák; Péter Gálfy; Lajos Őze
- Release dates: May 1982 (Cannes); 16 September 1982 (Hungary)
- Running time: 103 minutes
- Country: Hungary
- Languages: Hungarian; Russian

Time Stands Still (Hungarian: Megáll az idő) is a 1982 Hungarian film about two brothers and the woman they both love, their families, teachers, and friends, all living in Budapest in 1963, following the uprising of 1956. It stars István Znamenák, Henrik Pauer, Sándor Sőth, Anikó Iván and Lajos Őze and was directed by Péter Gothár. Popular among audience and critics, Gothár's film won the Award of the Youth at Cannes, the New York Film Critics Circle Award for Best Foreign Language Film and the award for Best Director at the Tokyo International Film Festival. The film was also selected as the Hungarian entry for the Best Foreign Language Film at the 55th Academy Awards, but was not accepted as a nominee. The film was chosen to be part of the New Budapest Twelve, a list of Hungarian films considered the best in 2000.

== Cast ==
- Anikó Iván as Szukics Magda
- István Znamenák as Dini
- Péter Gálfy as Wilman Péter, "Vilma"
- Henrik Pauer as Gábor
- Sándor Sőth as Pierre
- Ágnes Kakassy as Anya
- Lajos Öze as Bodor
- Pál Hetényi as Apa

== See also ==
- List of submissions to the 55th Academy Awards for Best Foreign Language Film
- List of Hungarian submissions for the Academy Award for Best Foreign Language Film
