= Michel Puig =

French composer (born 1930)

Michel Puig (born 1930) is a French composer. In 1953 he studied composition with René Leibowitz. In 1957 he published his Sonata for Piano and, the following year, Fantasia for Violin and Piano. In 1975 he composed a chamber opera Stigmates, to a libretto by Jacques Pajak. Among the composer's influences is jazz, and at the premiere of Stigmates the performers included the jazz guitarist Claude Barthélemy as well as classical musicians including Vinko Globokar.

A considerable part of Puig's oeuvre is musical theatre. Sa Négresse Jésus, Op. 26, a one-act work for three actors and a small instrumental ensemble (1974) was staged by Michael Lonsdale at the Théâtre des Amandiers, Nanterre. His Miroir, another one-act piece of music theatre, was premiered in Paris in 1975. His Monet ou la passion de la réalité, a one-act work for solo actress accompanied by clarinet, violin and piano, was first performed at the Semaines musicales internationales d'Orléans in 1979. Puig composed the music for a 1965 adaptation of Molière's The School for Wives starring François Périer, and set Lewis Carroll's The Hunting of the Snark for a cast of five actresses and eight actors and an instrumental ensemble of five players, premiered at the Festival d'Avignon in 1971.

Puig was for some time a teacher; his former students include Michèle Bokanowski.
