= Rita Renoir =

French strip-teaser and actress (1934–2016)

Rita Renoir (19 January 1934 – 4 May 2016) was a French strip-teaser and actress.

== Biography ==
Renoir was the Vedette of the Crazy Horse Saloon, in Paris, between the 1950s and 1960s, becoming one of the most famous European strip-teasers.

In 1964 Renoir was chosen by Michelangelo Antonioni to play the role of Emilia in The Red Desert, and the following year she made her theatrical debut in René de Obaldia's Du vent dans les branches de sassafras, alongside Michel Simon. In 1967 Renoir was the lead actress in Jean-Jacques Lebel's representation of the Pablo Picasso's drama Le Désir Attrapé par la Queue (Desire Caught by the Tail).

== Filmography ==
- 1953 : Les Compagnes de la nuit
- 1958 : Le Sicilien
- 1962 : Commandant X (TV)
- 1963 : Mondo di notte n. 3
- 1963 : Dragées au poivre
- 1964 : Ni figue ni raisin (TV)
- 1964 : The Red Desert
- 1966 : Chappaqua
- 1967 : Fantômas contre Scotland Yard
- 1970 : Cannabis
- 1975 : Le Futur aux trousses
- 1981 : Sois belle et tais-toi
- 1982 : The Angel
- 1984 : Lire c'est vivre : Élie Faure, Vélasquez et les Ménines (TV)
