= The Outpost (1995 film) =

1995 film

- Directed by: Péter Gothár
- Written by: Péter Gothár
- Based on: A részleg by Ádám Bodor
- Produced by: Mihail Cociasu; Cristian Comeaga; András Ozori
- Starring: Mari Nagy; József Szarvas; Valentin Teodosiu
- Narrated by: Mari Törőcsik
- Cinematography: Vivi Dragan Vasile
- Edited by: Eszter Majoros; Péter Tímár
- Music by: György Orbán; György Selmeczi
- Distributed by: Cinemagyar
- Release date: 16 February 1995 (Hungary)
- Running time: 82 minutes
- Countries: Hungary; Romania
- Languages: Hungarian; Romanian

The Outpost (Hungarian: A részleg, internationally also known as The Section) is a 1995 Hungarian drama film written and directed by Péter Gothár. It was screened in the Un Certain Regard section at the 1995 Cannes Film Festival. The film was selected as the Hungarian entry for the Best Foreign Language Film at the 68th Academy Awards, but was not accepted as a nominee.

== Cast ==
- Mari Nagy as Gizella Weisz
- József Szarvas as Öcsi, or Petya
- Valentin Teodosiu
- Misu Dimvale
- Andrei Finti
- Géza Tóth as Jani Kupter
- Alexandru Bindea as Colleague
- Stefan Sileanu as Onaga
- Marcel Marcu as Chauffeur
- Gheorghe Visu
- Radu Nicoara
- Monica Ghiuta
- Sándor Karácsony
- Ovidiu Ghinita
- Iván Dengyel
- Mari Törőcsik as Narrator (voice)

== See also ==
- List of submissions to the 68th Academy Awards for Best Foreign Language Film
- List of Hungarian submissions for the Academy Award for Best Foreign Language Film
