= Jadwiga Jankowska-Cieślak =

Polish actress (1951–2025)

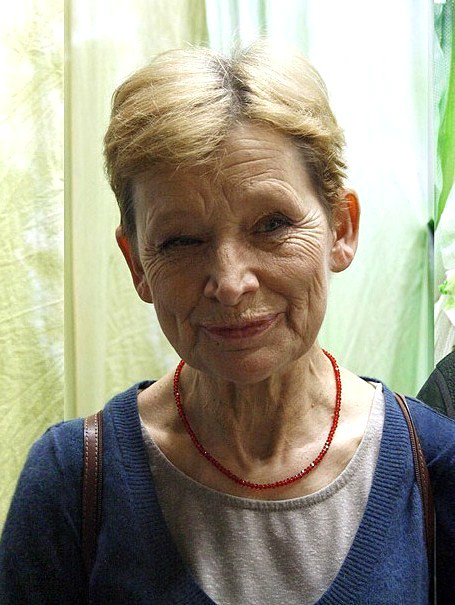
- Jankowska-Cieślak in 2015
- Born: 15 February 1951; Gdańsk, Poland
- Died: 15 April 2025 (aged 74)
- Occupation: Actress
- Years active: 1972–2025

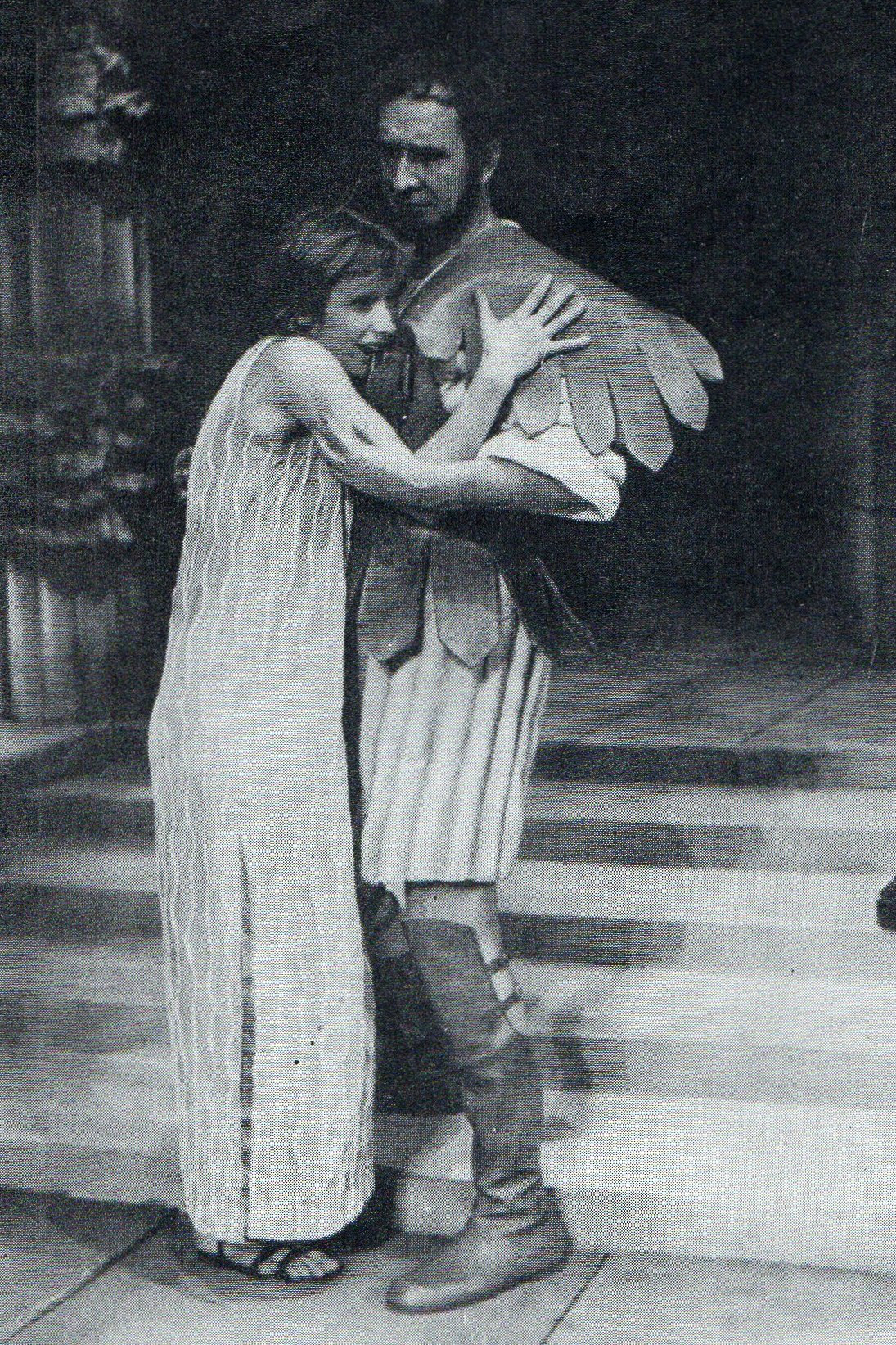
Jadwiga Jankowska-Cieślak on stage as Electra, 1973

Jadwiga Aleksandra Jankowska-Cieślak (15 February 1951 – 15 April 2025) was a Polish film actress. She appeared in 33 films from 1972 onwards.

Jankowska-Cieślak died on 15 April 2025, at the age of 74.

== Selected filmography ==
- Trzeba zabić tę miłość (1972) as Magda
- Another Way (1982) as Éva Szalánczky
- Scratch (2008) as Joanna Kocjan
- Sweet Rush (2009)
- Warszawianka (2023)

== Accolades ==
In 1973 she received Zbigniew Cybulski Award. She won the award for Best Actress at the 1982 Cannes Film Festival for her role in the film Another Way.

On 4 December 2007, she was awarded the Knight's Cross of the Order of Polonia Restituta "for her outstanding contribution to the work for democratic change in Poland, for her commitment to the fight for freedom of expression and free media, for achievements undertaken for the benefit of the country and social work". The decoration ceremony was held on 10 December 2007 in the Concert Studio of Polish Radio. On 5 October 2009, she received the Gold Medal of Gloria Artis.
