= Iosif Demian =

Romanian cinematographer (born 1941)

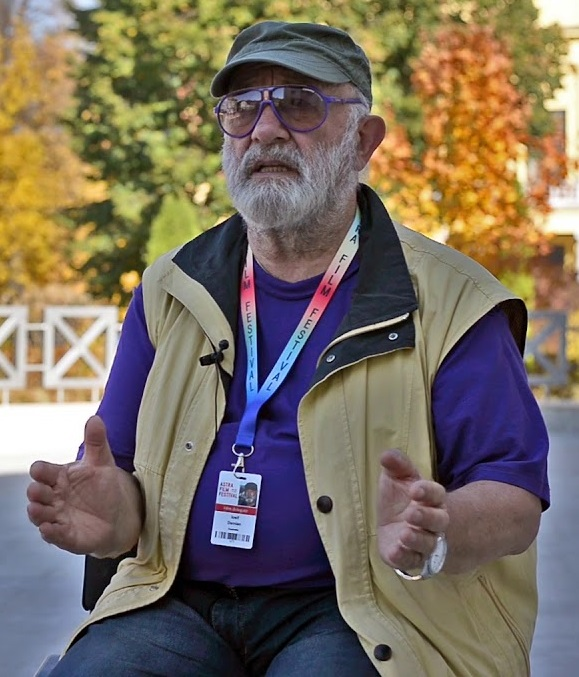
- Iosif Demian in 2017
- Born: 26 May 1941 (age 85); Nagyvárad, Hungary (now Oradea, Romania)
- Occupations: Cinematographer; Film director
- Years active: 1970–2001

Iosif Demian (born 26 May 1941) is a Romanian cinematographer and film director. His 1980 film A Girl's Tears was screened in the Un Certain Regard section at the 1982 Cannes Film Festival.

== Selected filmography ==
- A Girl's Tears (1980)
