= A Girl's Tears =

1980 film

- Directed by: Iosif Demian
- Written by: Petre Salcudeanu
- Produced by: Cornel Cristian
- Starring: Anton Aftenie
- Cinematography: Iosif Demian
- Release date: May 1980
- Running time: 83 minutes
- Country: Romania
- Language: Romanian

A Girl's Tears (Romanian: O lacrimă de fată) is a 1980 Romanian drama film directed by Iosif Demian. It was screened in the Un Certain Regard section at the 1982 Cannes Film Festival. It tells the story of a young girl's murder and how it changed the lives of the inhabitants of a Transylvanian village.

== Cast ==
- Anton Aftenie
- George Bussun
- George Negoescu
- Lujza Orosz
- Mihai Oroveanu
- Dragos Pîslaru
- Dorel Vişan as Maiorul
