= Vaska Easoff =

1996 film

- Directed by: Péter Gothár
- Written by: Péter Gothár
- Starring: Maksim Sergeyev
- Release date: 29 February 1996
- Running time: 85 minutes
- Country: Hungary
- Languages: Hungarian; Russian

Vaska Easoff (Hungarian: Haggyállógva, Vászka), also known as Letgohand Vaska (A Tale from the Labour Camp), is a 1996 Hungarian comedy film written and directed by Péter Gothár. The film was selected as the Hungarian entry for the Best Foreign Language Film at the 69th Academy Awards, but was not accepted as a nominee.

== Plot ==
Vászka is a professional robber in Soviet-era Leningrad (St. Petersburg) who is struggling with empty pockets and his girlfriend Luvnya's constant demands to visit Moscow. However, his fortunes change when he meets Ványka, another local thief, and the two form an alliance. Together, they pull off a grand heist, stealing the Tsar's hidden treasures from the National Bank and outwitting the Soviet authorities.

== Cast ==
- Maksim Sergeyev as Vászka, a thief from St. Petersburg
- Evgeniy Sidikhin as Ványka, a village thief
- Valentina Kasyanova as Luvnya
- Boris Solominovits as Fetyka

== Awards and nominations ==
- At the Hungarian Film Week of 1996, the film won the Grand Prize, Péter Gothár won the Best Director award, Francisco Gózon won the Best Cinematographer, Enikő Eszenyi won the Best Actress and Antal Cserna the Best Actor.
- At the 31st Karlovy Vary International Film Festival, the film was nominated for the Crystal Globe and Péter Gothár won the Best Director Award.
- At the 1996 Chicago International Film Festival, the film won the Audience Choice Award.

== See also ==
- List of submissions to the 69th Academy Awards for Best Foreign Language Film
- List of Hungarian submissions for the Academy Award for Best Foreign Language Film
