= Erzsébet Galgóczi =

- Born: 27 August 1930; Ménfőcsanak (Győr), Hungary
- Died: May 20, 1989 (aged 58); Ménfőcsanak (Győr), Hungary
- Occupations: writer, screenwriter
- Writing career
- Notable works: Vidravas; Törvényen belül Another Way

Erzsébet Galgóczi (27 August 1930 – 20 May 1989) was a Hungarian writer, playwright, and screenwriter. Her work is often described as realist fiction.

== Personal life ==
Galgóczi attended primary school in Ménfőcsanak, the small village where she was born, and attended high school between 1941 and 1945 in the nearby city of Győr. Between 1945 and 1949, she attended the teacher's training school of Győr, graduating in 1949. Between 1950 and 1955, she attended the Budapest Theater College, majoring in dramaturgy. She lived openly as a lesbian from the 1970s, and her long-time partner was actress Hilda Gobbi. On May 20, 1989, she died unexpectedly of a heart attack in her family home.

== Career ==
Originally a committed socialist writer, Galgóczi gradually lost faith in the regime, and her work reflects her growing criticism of political repression and corruption. Her most successful work in Hungary is Vidravas, and her novella Törvényen belül was made into a 1982 film by the award-winning Hungarian film director Károly Makk. Galgóczi wrote the script for the film, Egymásra nézve (English title: Another Way). An English translation of the original novella was published in 2007 under the title Another Love by Cleis Press.

== Awards ==
In 1978, Galgóczi received the Kossuth Prize. She was also the recipient of the SZOT Prize (1970) and the József Attila Prize (1962, 1969, 1976).
