= Marcos Magalhães =

Brazilian screenwriter and animator

- Born: 1958 (age 67–68); Rio de Janeiro, Brazil
- Occupation: Educator
- Known for: Animation

Marcos Magalhães (Portuguese pronunciation: [maɡaˈʎɐ̃js]; born in 1958 in Rio de Janeiro, Brazil) is a screenwriter and animator whose short films include Meow!, which received the Special Jury Prize at the 1982 Cannes Film Festival, and Animando, which was shot in the National Film Board of Canada.

== Career ==
Magalhães was responsible for the first professional course in animation in Brazil, held in collaboration with the National Film Board of Canada from 1985 to 1987. In 1986, he coordinated Planet Earth, a collective film by 30 Brazilian animators for UN's Year of Peace.

He's the conceiver and producer of Eight Point Star, a film entirely animated by the late Fernando Diniz, a renowned naïf painter who lived in a psychiatric institution in Brazil. As an artist-in-residence at the Division of Animation and Digital Arts of the University of Southern California, he completed in 1999 the film TwO, a 3D computer animation combined with animated scratches on 35 mm film.

In 2000, he produced for Nickelodeon the first Latin-American episode for the series Short Films by Short People. In 2002, he became a John Simon Guggenheim Foundation fellow with the project Dar Alma, that organized animation workshops for non-professionals. He has been an animation teacher in the Design graduation course since 2002, and also coordinator of the Animation post-graduation course since 2004, at the Pontifical Catholic University of Rio de Janeiro (PUC-Rio).

He is also one of the founders and directors of Anima Mundi, International Animation Festival of Brazil, the biggest annual event on animation in Latin America since 1993.
