= Another Way (1982 film) =

- DVD cover (British release)
- Directed by: Károly Makk; János Xantus (co-director)
- Written by: Károly Makk; Erzsébet Galgóczi
- Starring: Jadwiga Jankowska-Cieślak; Grażyna Szapołowska
- Cinematography: Tamás Andor
- Edited by: György Sívó
- Release date: May 1982
- Running time: 102 minutes
- Country: Hungary
- Language: Hungarian

Another Way (Hungarian: Egymásra nézve) is a 1982 Hungarian historical drama film directed by Károly Makk. The screenplay co-written by Makk and Erzsébet Galgóczi is based on Galgóczi's semi-autobiographical 1980 novella Törvényen belül (Another Love). The film stars Jadwiga Jankowska-Cieślak and Grażyna Szapołowska. Set in 1958, the story is about an affair between two women.

The film competed for the Palme d'Or at the 1982 Cannes Film Festival, and Jankowska-Cieślak received the Best Actress award. Another Way is the first Hungarian feature film to show a positive portrayal of homosexual love.

It was a notable cult film for lesbian audiences in Cold War Hungary and Poland.

== Plot ==
During Christmas of 1958, the body of Éva Szalánczky, an apparent murder victim, is recovered from a forest. Livia Horváth, bandaged around the neck, is recuperating in a hospital and told that she will be unable to live her life as before (the reason is not made explicit).

Éva, a lesbian known to the authorities because of her private life, begins a new job as a journalist for the weekly periodical The Truth, where she meets Livia when the two women share an office. The attraction is immediate, but Livia, who is married, is initially resistant. One night, while kissing in darkness on a park bench, they are discovered by a policeman, who warns Livia that her husband and employer will be informed if she is found in the same compromising position again. Éva is arrested, but soon released.

At a collective farm assignment, Éva finds out that the authorities have blocked an attempt at a more democratic way of organising the cooperative venture. Her editor, a supporter of the short-lived government of Imre Nagy, who was recently executed, refuses to publish the article, and she resigns before she is sacked.

Éva and Livia have an affair. Livia confesses her love for Éva to her husband, Dönci Horváth, an army officer, and he shoots her while she is in the bath. She survives and Dönci is imprisoned for the crime. At the hospital, Livia rejects Éva, who then journeys to the countryside. While walking at night, Éva is ordered to stop by the border guards, but she fails to do so and is shot dead.

== Cast ==
- Jadwiga Jankowska-Cieślak as Éva Szalánczky

- Ildikó Bánsági as Éva Szalánczky (voice)

- Grażyna Szapołowska as Livia Horváth

- Judit Hernádi as Livia Horváth (voice)

- Jozef Kroner as Erdős

- Gyula Szabó as Erdős (voice)

- Péter Andorai as Dönci Horváth, Lívia's husband

Jankowska-Cieślak and Szapołowska performed the dialogs of Éva and Livia in Polish and their voices were dubbed into Hungarian by Ildikó Bánsági and Judit Hernádi, respectively, for the released film.
