= Michèle Bokanowski =

French composer

Michèle Bokanowski (born 9 August 1943) is a French composer.

== Biography ==
She was born in Cannes, and was educated in traditional music. She continued her studies in composition in Paris with Michel Puig and in electronic music in 1970 at the Service de la recherche de l’ORTF (ORTF) directed by Pierre Schaeffer. She also studied computer music at the Faculté de Vincennes and electronic music with Éliane Radigue.

After completing her studies, Bokanowski worked as a composer.

She married Patrick Bokanowski and often collaborates with him for film, Catheringe Dasté for theater works, and choreographers Hideyuki Yano, Marceline Lartigue and Bernardo Montet for dance.

== Works ==
Bokanowski composes for concert performance, film, television, theatre and dance. Selected works include:

- Korè for one pianist
- Trois chambres d’inquiétude
- Tabou
- Chant d’ombre
- Cirque

She has composed soundtracks for films including:

- 2019 The Doll's Breath (short)
- 2008 Battements solaires (short)
- 2002 Le canard à l'orange (short)
- 1998 Flammes (short)
- 1998 Fugue (short)
- 1994 Au bord du lac (short)
- 1992 The Beach (short)
- 1984 La part du hasard
- 1982 The Angel
- 1974 Déjeuner du matin (short)
- 1972 The Woman Who Powders Herself (short)

Her work has been recorded and released on CD, including:

- L'Ange (CD, Album) trAce, 2003
- L'Étoile Absinthe / Chant D'Ombre (CD, Ltd) Optical Sound, 2010
- Tabou (CD, Mini) Metamkine, 1992
- Trois Chambres D'Inquiétude (CD, Ltd, EP), Elevator Bath, 2000
- L'Étoile Absinthe (CD, Mini) Metamkine, 2002
- Cirque (CD) Empreintes DIGITALes, 1995
- Pour Un Pianiste (CD) trAce, 2005
- Michèle Bokanowski (CD) trAce, 2009
