= Patrick Bokanowski =

French filmmaker

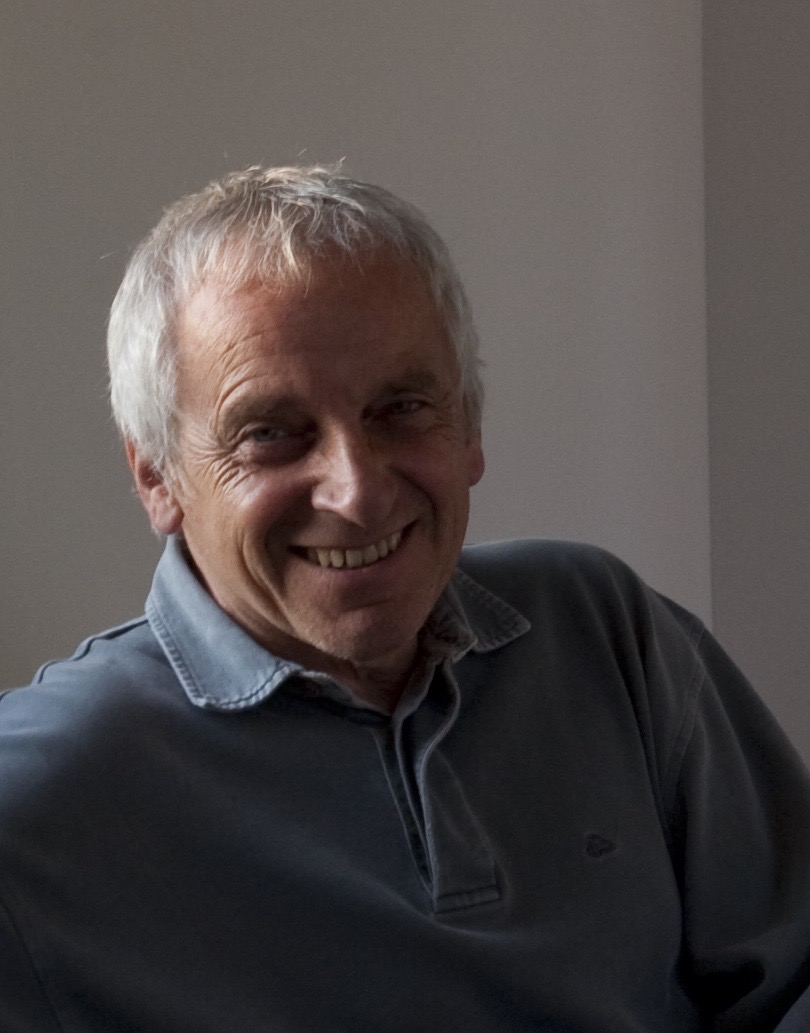
- Born: 23 June 1943 (age 83); Algiers, French Algeria
- Occupation: Filmmaker
- Years active: 1962–present
- Known for: Being an experimental filmmaker
- Notable work: The Angel (1982)
- Spouse: Michèle Bokanowski

Patrick Bokanowski (born 23 June 1943 in Algiers, French Algeria) is a French filmmaker who makes experimental and animated films.

== Career ==
The film The Angel (1982) is his most prominent work. It is accompanied by a soundtrack made by his wife, Michèle Bokanowski, and released on the 2003 CD album, L'Ange, by the label trAace.

Bokanowski develops work between the traditional cinematographic genres: short film, experimental film, and animation. His manner of treating filmic material is his research at the frontier of optical and visual arts, always in an "in-between" to create. He calls into question the idea that cinema's essence should be to reproduce reality, that is, our habits of thinking and feeling. His films contradict the "objectivity" of photography that is solidly essential to most of the global film productions. Bokanowski's experiments, with the aim of opening cinema to other expressive possibilities – for example the "warping" of objective lenses (though he prefers the term "subjective") – testify to purely mental visions that ignore conventional representations, affecting reality, transforming, and giving the viewer of his films new perceptual adventures.

In the booklet that accompanies the DVD which contains Bokanowski's sole two documentaries (La Part du Hasard, 1984, on the painter Henri Dimier; and Le Rêve éveillé, 2003; dialogues between the psychotherapist Colette Aboulker-Muscat and her patients), editor Pip Chodorov wrote: "The search for the overrunning of perception, and thereby oneself, is an expression of the spirituality present in the lives of these two figures: inspiration that we also found in Bokanowski's films, which are also searches into abstraction in the real, mysterious blanks that recover the daily. In his film The Angel, characters search for light, and rise in spirals towards beacons of white and pure light, the librarian-researchers conduct a fierce intellectual quest, hoping for an illuminating response buried under mountains of books. Light plays a central role for the filmmaker, just like it does for the painter and therapist, as a peak of dramatic pleasure. We are pulled forward, upward, through these leaks in the twilight towards the light." According to Raphaël Bassan, in his article «L'Ange: Un météore dans le ciel de l'animation,» Patrick Bokanowski's work can be considered the beginnings of contemporary animation.

== Filmography ==
- 1972: La Femme qui se poudre, 16 mm, Black and White, 15 Minutes.
- 1974: Déjeuner du matin, 16 mm, Color, 11 Minutes and 30 Seconds.
- 1982: L'Ange, 35 mm, Color, 64 Minutes and 5 Seconds.
- 1984: La Part du hasard, 16 mm, Color, 52 Minutes.
- 1992: La Plage, 16 mm, Color, 12 Minutes and 45 Seconds.
- 1993: Au bord du lac, 16 mm, Color, 5 Minutes and 30 Seconds.
- 1998: Flammes, 35 mm, Color, 3 Minutes and 40 Seconds.
- 2002: Le Canard à l'orange, 16 mm, Color, 8 Minutes.
- 2002: Eclats d'Orphée, 16 mm, Color, 4 Minutes and 35 Seconds.
- 2003: Le Rêve éveillé, Video, Color, 41 Minutes.
- 2008: Battements solaires, 35 mm, Color, 17 Minutes and 45 Seconds.
- 2014: Un Rêve, 35 mm, Color, 30 Minutes and 55 Seconds.
- 2016: Un Rêve Solaire, 35 mm, Color, 63 minutes.
- 2018: L’envol, Color, 8 minutes.
- 2018: L’indomptable, Color, 4 minutes.

== Publications about his films ==
- Gérard Langlois, «L'image standard en question,» Cinéma pratique, n° 137, mai–juin 1975, p. 46–49, 80. (in French)
- Dominique Noguez, «Préface du catalogue,» Trente ans de cinéma expérimental en France: 1950–1980, Paris, ARCEF, 1982. (in French)
- Raphaël Bassan, «Bokanowski/Kamler: Deux avant-gardes graphiques,» Canal, n° 49, juillet–septembre 1982. (in French)
- Raphaël Bassan, «L'Ange: Un météore dans le ciel de l'animation,» La Revue du cinéma, n° 393, avril 1984. (in French)
- Vincent Ostria, «L'escalier de l'être-ange,» Cahiers du cinéma, n° 358, avril 1984, p. 46–47. (in French)
- Youssef Ishaghpour, «Bokanowski: L'Ange,» Cinéma contemporain: De ce côté du miroir, Paris, Éditions de la Différence, 1986, p. 318–331. (in French)
- Dominique Noguez, «La montée de la lumière: Bokanowski,» Le cinéma autrement, Paris, Éditions du Cerf, 1987, p. 280–281. (in French)
- Patrick Bokanowski, «L'Ange,» Noise n° 12, Paris, Maeght Éditeur, 1990. (in French)
- Sous la direction de María Klonáris et Katerína Thomadáki, Technologies et imaginaires: Art cinéma, art vidéo, art ordinateur, Paris, Dis Voir, 1990. (in French)
- Entretien de Patrick Bokanowski avec le Groupe Art Toung, «Styles d'image cinématographique,» Revue & Corrigée, n° 8, printemps 1991, p. 22–25. (in French)
- Jean-Michel Frodon, «Les enquêteurs du regard,» Le Monde, 27 janvier 1994. (in French)
- Dominique Noguez, «Préface à la rétrospective à la Galerie nationale du Jeu de Paume,» février–mars 1994. (in French)
- Vincent Ostria, «Patrick Bokanowski,» Cahiers du cinéma, n° 478, avril 1994, p. 10–11. (in French)
- Jacques Kermabon, «Portrait Patrick Bokanowski,» Bref, le magazine du court métrage, n° 20, février–mars–avril 1994, p. 17–19. (in French)
- «Patrick Bokanowski,» Catalogue sous la direction de Jean-Michel Bouhours, L'art du mouvement: Collection cinématographique du Musée national d'art moderne, 1919–1996, Paris, Centre Georges Pompidou, 1996, p. 52–53. (in French)
- Scott MacDonald, "Patrick Bokanowski on The Angel," A Critical Cinema: Interviews with Independent Filmmakers 3, Oakland, University of California Press, 1998, pp. 262–273.
- Dominique Noguez, Éloge du cinéma expérimental, Classiques de l'Avant-garde, Paris, Éditions Paris Expérimental, 2ème édition, 1999. (in French)
- Hugo Bélit, «Des flammes! Notes sur trois courts métrages de Patrick Bokanowski,» Bref, le magazine du court métrage, n° 42, automne 1999, p. 10–11. (in French)
- Patrick Bokanowski, «Réflexions optiques,» Sous la direction de Christian Lebrat et Nicole Brenez, Jeune, dure et pure! Une histoire du cinéma d'avant-garde et expérimental en France, Paris et Milan, Cinémathèque française, Musée du cinéma, et Mazzotta, 2001, p. 486–489. (in French)
- Hugo Bélit, «Bokanowski, Patrick,» Sous la direction de Jacky Evrard et Jacques Kermabon, Une encyclopédie du court-métrage français, Côté cinéma, Pantin et Crisnée, Éditions festival Côté Court et Yellow Now, 2004, p. 54–59. (in French)
- Tamara Rama and Carmen Lloret, «Unveiling and Revealing the Mirror: Mobile Reverberations in Patrick Bokanowski’s Animated Films,» Animation: an interdisciplinary journal. SAGE Publishing. Vol 14; Issue 2, 2019, pp. 83–101. https://doi.org/10.1177/1746847719856997
