= Half a Life (film) =

- Mourir à 30 ans
- Directed by: Romain Goupil
- Written by: Romain Goupil
- Produced by: Marin Karmitz
- Starring: Alain Bureau; Romain Goupil; Pierre Goupil; Sophie Goupil; Jacques Kébadian
- Cinematography: Pierre Goupil; Jean-César Chiabaut; Renan Pollès
- Edited by: Franssou Prenant
- Distributed by: MK2 Diffusion
- Release date: 1982
- Running time: 95 minutes
- Country: France
- Language: French

Half a Life (French: Mourir à 30 ans) is a 1982 film directed by Romain Goupil. The film won the Caméra d'Or and Award of the Youth (French film) at the Cannes Film Festival, along with the César Award for Best Debut.

== Plot ==
The film is a biographical black-and-white documentary about Michel Recanati, a militant leader during the May 1968 riots in Paris.

It tells the story of two friends through the left-wing groups in Paris between 1966 and 1978 when Michel goes missing and it is later discovered that he committed suicide. The film is both a personal tale and an in-depth look at the political scene in France during those years. It also documents the history of the CAL [Highschool Student Action Committee] and the LCR Revolutionary Communist League .

== Main protagonists ==
Much of the original footage filmed over 10 years before the 1982 movie documentary was also filmed by Goupil. His father Pierre worked in the cinema and Romain armed with a super 8 camera took some footage of the student riots and meetings from that time in Paris.

There is footage of speeches by Alain Krivine a leader of the Trotskyist movement in France and a member of the Revolutionary Communist League known by the acronym LCR Ligue Communiste Révolutionnaire.

Other key figures of the French Left are interviewed at various points in the documentary. They include Trotskyist journalist Maurice Najman, also Henri Weber when he was a leading member of the Trotskyist Revolutionary Communist Youth known in French as: (JCR) Jeunesse communiste révolutionnaire and also a member of Revolutionary Communist League (LCR).

== Reception ==
Vincent Canby summed up his review for The New York Times, "There is a lot of Francois Truffaut's Antoine Doinel in the Romain Goupil we see in Half a Life, especially in Mr. Goupil's inability to commit himself to any one cause for very long without seeing the other side. His film is the work of a talented, extremely self-aware new director."
