= The Angel (1982 film) =

- Theatrical release poster
- L'Ange
- Directed by: Patrick Bokanowski
- Written by: Patrick Bokanowski
- Produced by: Patrick Bokanowski
- Starring: Maurice Baquet; Jean-Marie Bon; Martine Couture; Jacques Faure; Mario Gonzales; René Patrignani; Rita Renoir; Patricia Peretti; Alain Salomon; Dominique Serrand; Nicolas Serreau; Max Guy Cravagnac; Abby Patrix
- Cinematography: Patrick Bokanowski
- Edited by: Patrick Bokanowski
- Music by: Michèle Bokanowski
- Production company: Kira B.M. Films
- Distributed by: Forum Distribution
- Release date: 25 May 1982 (International Critics' Week)
- Running time: 64 Minutes
- Country: France
- Language: no dialogue spoken
- Budget: F 3,200,000

The Angel (French: L'Ange) is a 1982 French experimental art film directed by Patrick Bokanowski. It was released on DVD for the first time in 2009, edited by the British Animation Awards. The film was shown at Fantasporto during February 1983 and shown to the general public in France on April 4, 1984.

== Synopsis ==
The Angel does not have a narrative set in place; rather, there is a guideline governing its shifts and development. The masked silhouettes climb stairs, and engage in various meetings on each level, while being digitally manipulated in time. The film could be described as a spiritual quest that doubles as a study of optical illusions, Bokanowski recreating all the objectives of his cameras. This is a feature film, which is rare for artisanal animation and experimental films.

In the booklet that accompanies the DVD which contains Bokanowski's sole two documentaries (La Part du Hasard, 1984, on the painter Henri Dimier; and Le Rêve éveillé, 2003; dialogues between the psychotherapist Colette Béatrice Aboulker-Muscat and her patients), editor Pip Chodorov wrote: "The search for the overrunning of perception, and thereby oneself, is an expression of the spirituality present in the lives of these two figures: inspiration that we also found in Bokanowski's films, which are also searches into abstraction in the real, mysterious blanks that recover the daily. In his film The Angel, characters search for light, and rise in spirals towards beacons of white and pure light, the librarian-researchers conduct a fierce intellectual quest, hoping for an illuminating response buried under mountains of books. Light plays a central role for the filmmaker, just like it does for the painter and therapist, as a peak of dramatic pleasure. We are pulled forward, upward, through these leaks in the twilight towards the light."

=== Themes of ascension ===
Again according to Raphaël Bassan, The Angel can be seen as a spiritual ascension. Patrick Bokanowski creates his own universe and obeys his own aesthetic logic. It takes us through a series of distorted areas, obscure visions, metamorphoses, and synthetic objects. Indeed, in the film, the human may be viewed as a fetish object (for example, the doll hanging by a thread), with reference to Kafkaesque and Freudian theories on automata and the fear of man faced with something as complex as him. The ascent of the stairs would be the liberation of the ideas of death, culture, and sex that makes us reach the emblematic figure of the angel.

=== Themes of vision and sight ===
For Jacques Kermabon, The Angel is a variation of optics, as control and manipulation of light, as attested by the integration of plastic optical devices. Similarly, the effects on perspective diagrams emphasizes the relativity of this representation process. In the same gesture, the aesthetics of The Angel, which opens up an infinity of possibilities, announces a cinema that would be before any movement, rhythm, rhyme, form, or work on the color and material: a cinema where the meaning is dissolved and effect predominates. In a way, Patrick Bokanowski brilliantly realized what some artists-filmmakers envisioned in the 1920s: an aesthetic for creations to come – the Cinéma pur and the first avant-garde.

== Soundtrack ==
A CD album containing the soundtrack accompanying the film, composed by Michèle Bokanowski, the director's wife, was released during 2003 by the label trAace under the title L'Ange.

== Technical information ==
- Title: The Angel
- Country: France
- Release Date: 25 May 1982
- Format: Color
- Duration: 64 Minutes
- Shooting: 1977–1982
- Directing, Editing, Special Effects, and Cinematography: Patrick Bokanowski
- Music and Sound Editing: Michèle Bokanowski
- Cameraman: Philippe Lavalette
- Sets and Models: Christian Daninos and Patrick Bokanowski
- Masks: Christian Daninos
- Costumes: Domenika
- Production: Kira B.M. Films
- Distribution: Forum Distribution

=== Cast ===
- First Librarian: Maurice Baquet
- Bathing Man: Jean-Marie Bon
- Servant: Martine Couture
- Swordsman/Handless Man: Jacques Faure
- Librarian/Apprentice: Mario Gonzales
- Librarian/Artist: René Patrignani
- Naked Woman: Rita Renoir
- Sewing Woman: Patricia Peretti
- Librarian: Alain Salomon
- Librarian: Dominique Serrand
- Librarian: Nicolas Serreau
- Librarian: Max Guy Cravagnac
- Librarian: Abby Patrix

== Report on the animation ==
According to Raphaël Bassan, in his article «L'Ange: Un météore dans le ciel de l'animation,» Patrick Bokanowski's film, along with Piotr Kamler's film Chronopolis, both having premiered in 1982 at the Cannes Film Festival, can be considered the beginnings of contemporary animation. This remark is based on the technical means and the visual or philosophical sense employed by Patrick Bokanowski. The masks erase all human personality in the characters. Patrick Bokanowski would thus have total control over the "matter" of the image and its optical composition. This is especially noticeable throughout the film, with images taken through distorted objectives or a plastic work on the sets and costumes, for example in the scene of the designer.

== See also ==
- List of films about angels

== Bibliography ==
- Raphaël Bassan, «Bokanowski/Kamler: Deux avant-gardes graphiques,» Canal, n° 49, juillet–septembre 1982. (in French)
- Raphaël Bassan, «L'Ange: Un météore dans le ciel de l'animation,» La Revue du cinéma, n° 393, avril 1984. (in French)
- Youssef Ishaghpour, «Bokanowski: L'Ange,» Cinéma contemporain: De ce côté du miroir, Paris, Éditions de la Différence, 1986, p. 318–331. (in French)
- Patrick Bokanowski, «L'Ange,» Noise n° 12, Paris, Maeght Éditeur, 1990. (in French)
- Jacques Kermabon, «Portrait Patrick Bokanowski,» Bref, le magazine du court métrage, n° 20, février–mars–avril 1994, p. 17–19. (in French)
- Scott MacDonald, "Patrick Bokanowski on The Angel," A Critical Cinema: Interviews with Independent Filmmakers 3, Oakland, University of California Press, 1998, pp. 262–273.
- Dominique Noguez, Éloge du cinéma expérimental, Classiques de l'Avant-garde, Paris, Éditions Paris Expérimental, 2ème édition, 1999. (in French)
