= Raphaël Bassan =

French film critic and journalist (born 1948)

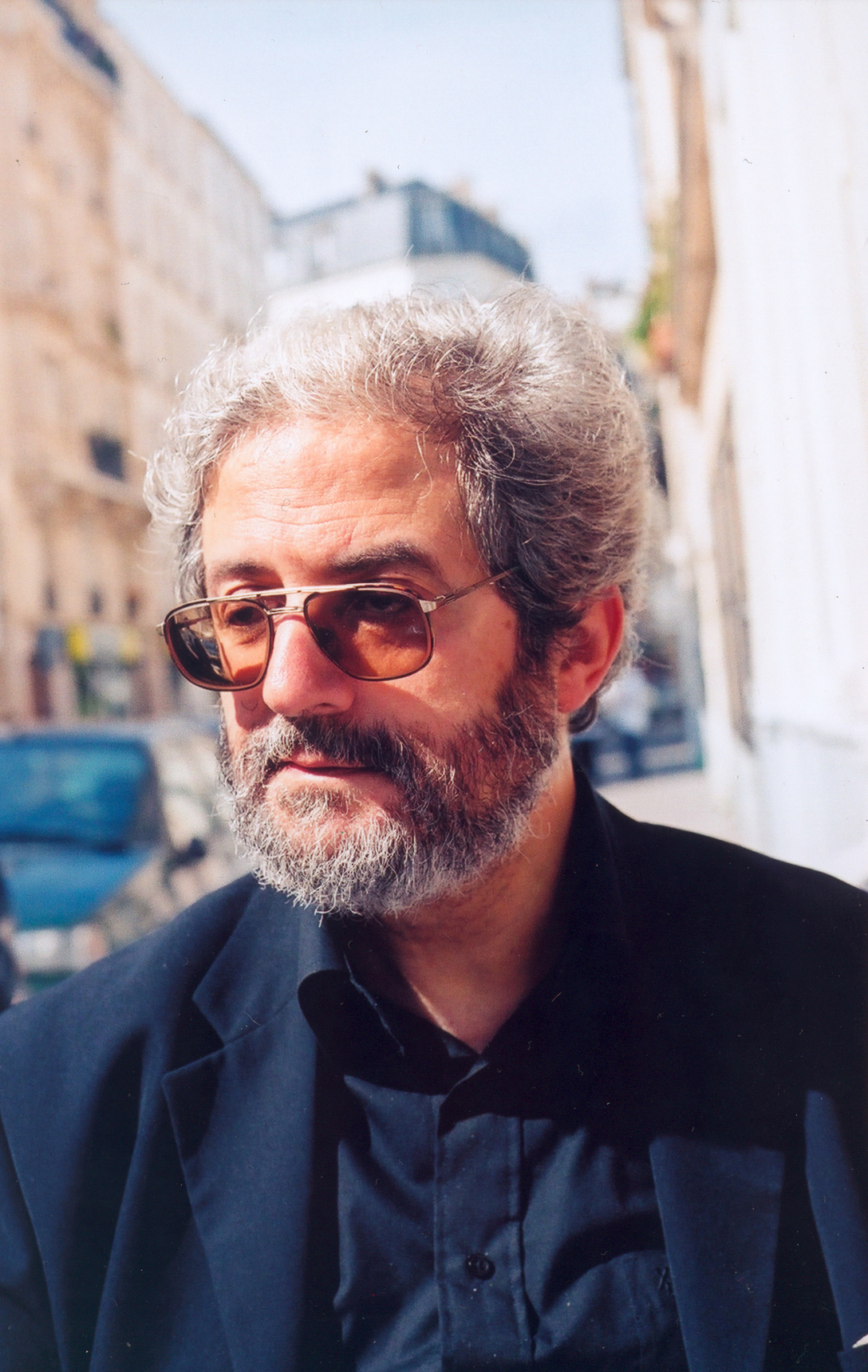
- Bassan in 2012
- Born: 26 August 1948 (age 78); Burgas, Bulgaria
- Occupations: Film critic, journalist, filmmaker

Raphaël Bassan (born 1948) is a French film critic and journalist, who has specialized in experimental film and the history of cinema. He has also made three short movies.

== Biography ==
Bassan was born in Burgas, Bulgaria, of French nationality, in 1948. His family moved to Paris in 1949. He has been interested in all forms of cinema from childhood. He has been a poet since 1964. He was one of the founders with Hubert Haddad of the magazine, Le Point d'Être (which only published three issues). Feeling that he was locked into a post-surrealist form, he chose to write in a "more modern" style as a critic. After writing reviews in specialized magazines, his first "professional" job was for the magazine Politique Hebdo when it was founded in 1970. He co-founded the Collectif Jeune Cinéma in 1971, the first French co-op of experimental cinema, and collaborated with a large number of magazines and various publications, notably the cinema magazines: Téléciné (1972–1976), Écran (1976–1980), Cinéma différent (1976–1980), La Revue du cinéma (1980–1992), Le Mensuel du cinéma (1992–1994), and the fine arts magazines: Canal (1978–1988), L'Art vivant (second formula: beginning of the 1980s), and the French national daily newspaper, Libération (1985–1991) and Senses of Cinema.

=== About Experimental films ===
As well as supporting cinema d’auteurs (Jean-Luc Godard, Jacques Rivette, Jim Jarmusch, Manoel de Oliveira, Raoul Ruiz, Roman Polanski, or Andrei Tarkovsky) and writing about current productions, Bassan wrote about and encouraged experimental cinema. He was able to follow the evolution this cinema genre more attentively when it enjoyed a resurgence at the end of the 1990s, and write about its young artists. He has written in Bref, a magazine dedicated to short films in which experimental cinema occupies an important part, from its first publication in 1989, His article, Experimental or simply filmmakers? An interview with Stéphane du Mesnildot, Johanna Vaude, David Matarasso and Othello Vilgard, inaugurated this series in Bref number 47 (November–December 2000). He has written the film column for Europe since 1984, for Bref, since its founding in 1989, for the Encyclopædia Universalis since 1995 and for Zeuxis since 2005.

In 1980, he coordinated the numbers 10-11 of the magazine CinémAction with Guy Hennebelle: Avant-garde cinema (experimental and militant). He has participated in the Dictionnaire du cinéma (Larousse, 1986 coordinated by Jean-Loup Passek), in the Dictionnaire du cinéma mondial (published by Les Éditions du Rocher, 1994 and coordinated by Alain and Odette Virmaux), in L'Art du mouvement (Cinema Collection of the National Museum of Modern Art, Centre Georges Pompidou, 1996, coordinated by Jean-Michel Bouhours), in Jeune, dure et pure ! Une histoire du cinéma d'avant-garde et expérimental français (under the direction of Nicole Brenez and Christian Lebrat, published by Cinémathèque Française/Mazzotta, 2001) and in Une Encyclopédie du court métrage (coordinated by Jacky Evrard and Jacques Kermabon, Yellow Now, Côté Court, Pantin, 2004). Raphaël Bassan has been published in three Cahiers de Paris expérimental: number 17, Norman McLaren: Le Silence de Prométhée; number 20, Les 20 ans de Paris expérimental (in collaboration with Daphné Le Sergent and Marc Sautereau) and number 25: Cinéma et abstraction: des croisements (2007). In 2014, he brought together some of his articles on avant-garde films for a book, "Cinéma experimental. Abécédaire pour une contre-culture" (Published by Yellow Now, Belgium). For the first time in that kind of publication, the reader can find a large number of articles about French Filmmakers - from the twenties to the present - they're there with international artists of the genre such as Hans Richter and Michael Snow. He have collaborated with Collectif Jeune Cinema from 1971 until today (2018) and defended experimental cinema in all kind of supports and practices In 2021, he organized, with Frederic Tachou, Laurence Rebouillon and Théo Delyannis the celebration of the 50 th birthday of Collectif Jeune Cinema.

=== Other activities ===
He coined, in 1989, the theory of cinema du look, in a study about the films of Jean-Jacques Beineix, Luc Besson and Leos Carax, published by La Revue du Cinéma. These directors were said to favor style over substance, spectacle over narrative; they mixed high culture and pop culture.,

He has been on numerous radio programs and held a small role in Le Prestige de la mort (2006) by Luc Moullet. Some of his poems were republished in the volume: Rites et rituels (Europe/Poésie 2001). He has also made three short films.

=== Publications ===
- Cinémas d'avant-garde (expérimental et militant), dir. Raphaël Bassan and Guy Hennebelle, CinémAction n° 10-11, Spring-Summer, 1980
- «Bokanowski/Kamler: Deux avant-gardes graphiques,» Canal, n° 49, juillet–septembre 1982. (in French)
- «L'Ange: Un météore dans le ciel de l'animation,» La Revue du cinéma, n° 393, avril 1984. (in French)
- Rites et rituels, book of poetry (1966–1972), Europe/Poésie, 2001
- Norman McLaren. Le Silence de Prométhée, Les Cahiers de Paris expérimental", n° 17, 2004
- Cinéma et abstraction : des croisements, Les Cahiers de Paris expérimental, n° 25, 2007
- Cinéma experimental. Abécédaire pour une contre-culture (Yellow Now, Belgium, 2014), in French

=== Filmography ===
- 1969 - Le Départ d’Eurydice (16 mm, black and white, sound, 11 minutes), with Michèle Samama (Michele Worth), Anton Perich. Deposit : Cinémathèque Française. This film belongs to the Musée National d'Art Moderne (MNAM – Centre Pompidou) Film's Collections.
- 1971 - Prétextes (16mm, black and white, sound, 13 minutes), with Michèle Samama (Michele Worth), Michel Maingois. Deposit : Cinémathèque Française.
- 2004 — Lucy en miroir (16 mm, color and black and white, 45 mn), with Anne-Sophie Brabant and Élodie Imbeau. Distributed by Le Collectif Jeune Cinéma.

This films was published in 2017 under the title Raphaël Bassan, le critique filmeur by the label Re : Voir Vidéo directed by the filmmaker Pip Chodorov.
