= Romain Goupil =

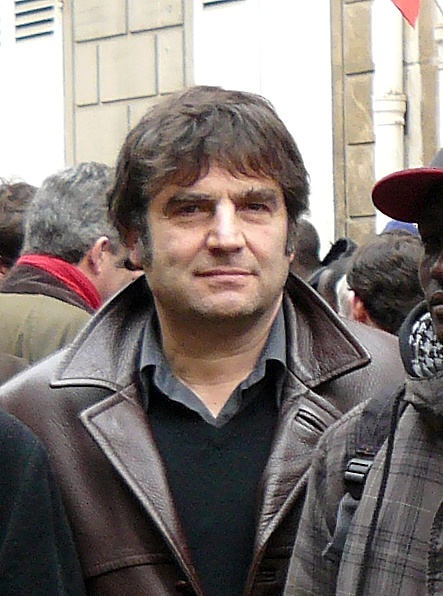
- Romain Goupil in 2010
- Born: Romain-Pierre Charpentier; 12 July 1951 (age 74); Paris, France
- Occupation: Filmmaker
- Years active: 1968–present

Romain-Pierre Charpentier (born 12 July 1951 in Paris), known professionally as Romain Goupil, is a French filmmaker. He won the César Award for Best First Film for Half a Life. He was a college leader during the May 1968 civil unrest in France and was for a long time a trotskyist militant. During the 2000s decade he aligned with the positions of the Cercle de l'Oratoire, and supported Emmanuel Macron in 2017.

== Early life ==
Romain Goupil was born in an artist family. His father, Pierre Goupil (born in 1930), was a cinematographer. His grandmother, Lita Recio (1906–2006), was an actor well known for dubbing. She was married to singer Robert Charpentier, named Goupil (1896–1938). Romain Goupil lived in the Cité Montmartre-aux-artistes, where his grandparents also lived.

== Political engagement ==
Romain Goupil is a public figure known in France for his political engagement since his teenage years. He retraced his early engagement in militant groups in his first feature-length film "Mourir à trente ans" using his personal archives and interviews of militant who took part in the event of May 1968. Romain Goupil is then know to often appear on television to discuss in public debates. From 2017 onwards he publicly support the candidacy of Emmanuel Macron.

== Filmography ==
- 1968: L'Exclu (short film)
- 1969: Ibizarre (short film)
- 1975: Setúbal, ville rouge
- 1980: Le Père Goupil (short film)
- 1982: Mourir à trente ans
- 1983: La Java des ombres
- 1990: Maman
- 1994: Lettre pour L...
- 1994: Paris est à nous
- 1995: Sa vie à elle
- 1999: À mort la mort !
- 2002: Une pure coïncidence
- 2010: Les Mains en l'air
- 2014: Les Jours venus
- 2018: La Traversée
