= Péter Gothár =

Hungarian filmmaker (born 1947)

- Born: 28 August 1947 (age 78); Pécs, Hungary
- Occupations: Film director, screenwriter
- Years active: 1974–present

Péter Gothár (born 28 August 1947) is a Hungarian film director and screenwriter. He has directed 23 films since 1974. His film The Outpost was screened in the Un Certain Regard section at the 1995 Cannes Film Festival.

== Selected filmography ==
- Time Stands Still (1982)
- The Outpost (1995)
- Vaska Easoff (1996)
