= Dominique Noguez =

French writer (1942–2019)

- Born: 12 September 1942; Bolbec, France
- Died: 15 March 2019 (aged 76); Paris, France
- Writing career
- Language: French
- Notable work: Amour noir
- Notable awards: Prix Femina

Dominique Noguez (12 September 1942 – 15 March 2019) was a French writer. He won the Prix Femina in 1997, for Amour noir. He taught the history of film at the Sorbonne. He was an early defender of Michel Houellebecq.
