= Mehmet Aktaş =

Turkish filmmaker

- Born: 1966 (age 59–60); Iğdır, Turkey
- Occupations: Filmmaker, producer, author, journalist
- Years active: 2002–present
- Organization: Mîtosfilm
- Known for: Kurdish cinema, Film production, Film festivals
- Notable work: "Memories on Stone", "The Rain Bride", "Letter to the King"
- Website: mitosfilm.com

Mehmet Aktaş (born 1966 in Iğdır, Turkey) is a Kurdish filmmaker, producer, author, and journalist. He was born in Turkey but currently resides in Germany. Aktaş is the founder and chief executive of the film production and distribution company, Mîtosfilm, based in Berlin.

In the mid-1990s, Aktaş moved to Germany after completing his studies at law school in Istanbul. While in Germany, he noticed that German audiences often disregarded cinema from the Near East, particularly Kurdish cinema. To address this, Aktaş founded the first Kurdish Film Festival in Germany in 2002, which was supported by the Hauptstadtkulturfonds.

With Mîtosfilm, Aktaş has produced feature films such as Close up Kurdistan (2007) directed by Yüksel Yavuz, Land of Legend (2008) directed by Rahim Zabihi, and Après la Chute (2009) directed by Hiner Saleem. In 2009, Aktaş was successful as the producer of No One Knows About Persian Cats directed by Bahman Ghobadi, which was honored at the Cannes Film Festival with the award Un Certain Regard.

Mîtosfilm also functions as a film distribution company, focusing on new Turkish, Kurdish, Iraqi and Iranian auteur cinema. Since 2004, Mîtosfilm has released films in German cinemas, including Turtles Can Fly (2004), Two Girls from Istanbul (2005), Süt (2008), and Min Dît (2010). These films illustrate Aktaş's political aspiration to provide a more authentic image of life in the Near East than what is typically portrayed in the news.

Mehmet Aktaş also wrote the screenplay for Hisham Zaman's second feature film Letter to the King (2014), which received the Dragon Award for Best Nordic Film at the Göteborg Film Festival in 2014. Mîtosfilm's latest production Memories on Stone (2014) directed by Shawkat Amin Korki and written by Aktaş and Korki was awarded Best Film from the Arab World at the Abu Dhabi Film Festival in 2014. Korki won the prize for Best Director at the Cinedays Skopje – 13th Festival of European Film. Memories on Stone was released in Swiss cinemas by the distributor Trigon Film in November 2014.

Since then, Aktaş has produced and executive produced several features and documentaries, including The Legend of the Ugly King by Hüseyin Tabak, which premiered at the Toronto International Film Festival in 2017. The Rain Bride (2022) by Hussein Hassan premiered at the Göteborg Film Festival in 2023.

His latest production In the Blind Spot (2023) by Ayşe Polat premiered at the 73rd Berlinale in the section Encounters. The political thriller went on to win four awards at the 42nd Istanbul Film Festival, including the Golden Tulip for Best Feature and Best Screenplay.

Since 2011, Aktaş has also served as the artistic director for the Duhok International Film Festival.

== Filmography ==
As Producer: 2023: In the Blind Spot; Director: Ayse Polat

2022: The Rain Bride; Director: Hussein Hassan

2017: The Legend of the Ugly King; Director: Hüseyin Tabak

2016: Gulîstan, Land of Roses; Director: Zaynê Akyol

2015: Reseba – The Dark Wind; Director: Hussein Hassan

2014/2015: House Without Roof; Director: Soleen Yusef -in pre-production-

2014: Memories On Stone; Director: Shawkat Amin Korki

2014: Song of my mother; Director: Erol Mintaş

2013: Before Snowfall; Director: Hisham Zaman

2009: No One Knows About Persian Cats; Director: Bahman Ghobadi

2009: Après La Chute; Director: Hiner Saleem

2008: Land Of Legend; Director: Rahim Zabihi

2008: Dol; Director: Hiner Saleem

As Executive Producer:

2022

Documentaries

2014/2015: The Legend Of The Ugly King – Yilmaz Güney; Director: Hüseyin Tabak -in production-

2007: Close up Kurdistan; Director: Yüksel Yavuz

2005: Traces (Le peuple du Paon); Director: Binevsa Bêrîvan

2003: Daf – Tambourine; Director: Bahman Ghobadi

2004: The War Is Over; Director: Bahman Ghobadi

As author

2014: Memories On Stone; Director: Shawkat Amin Korki

2014: Letter to the King; Director: Hisham Zaman

== Awards ==
- Memories on Stone:

ABU DHABI FILM FESTIVAL, Best Film of the Arab World

ASIA PACIFIC SCREEN AWARDS, Unesco Award

CINEDAYS FESTIVAL OF EUROPEAN FILM SKOPJE, Best Director

FANTASPORTO FILM FESTIVAL, Best Script, Best Director, Special Mention of the Critics

PEACE ON EARTH FILM FESTIVAL, Best Feature Film

RIVER RUN FILM FESTIVAL, Best Feature Film

- Song Of My Mother

20. SARAJEVO FILM FESTIVAL, Heart of Sarajevo for Best Film

- Letter To The King

AMANDA AWARD (NORWAY), Best Screenplay

GÖTEBORG INTERNATIONAL FILM FESTIVAL, Dragon Award for Best Nordic Film

Lecce European Film Festival, Fipresci Prize

DUBAI INTERNATIONAL FILM FESTIVAL, Special Mention

DUHOK INTERNATIONAL FILM FESTIVAL, Best Kurdish script
