= Memory (Dan Michaelson and The Coastguards album) =

Studio album by Dan Michaelson and The Coastguards
- Released: 6 May 2016
- Recorded: London, UK
- Studio: The Premises, London
- Genre: Alternative; Americana; Mumblecore
- Label: The state51 Conspiracy
- Producer: Dan Michaelson

Professional ratings
Review scores
Source	Rating
The Guardian	link

Memory is a 2016 album by Dan Michaelson and The Coastguards. It is the final installment in an album trilogy that commenced with 2013's Blindspot and continued with Distance in 2014. The album was written and produced by Michaelson and mixed by Ash Workman (Metronomy, Christine and the Queens). The album was recorded at The Premises, London and is available on CD, vinyl and digital. Joining the Coastguards (Henry Spenner, Laurie Earle and Horse) are Romeo Stodart of The Magic Numbers and Johnny Flynn.

"I went looking for a way to carry what I'd written. Memory is the end point of this particular story. In my small world, Blindspot is the script, Distance is the play, and Memory is the widescreen movie." — Dan Michaelson

== Track listing ==
All tracks are written by Dan Michaelson

No.	Title	Length
1.	"Tides"
2.	"Memory"
3.	"Missing Piece"
4.	"Lost Birds"
5.	"Undo"
6.	"No Other Way"
7.	"Half the Reason"

== Personnel ==
Performers

- Dan Michaelson (vocals, guitar, piano)
- Henry Spenner (drums)
- Laurie Earle (guitar, piano)
- Horse (guitar)
- Romeo Stodart (bass)
- Ali Friend (double bass)
- Gabriel Stebbing
- Johnny Flynn (violin and flugelhorn)
- Jin Theriault (baritone sax)
- Yusuf Narcin (trombone)
- Christo Squire (alto sax).

Production

- Dan Michaelson
- Ash Workman
