= Blind spot =

Blind spot or Blindspot may refer to:

== Ophthalmology and vision ==
- Blind spot (vision), also known as the physiological blind spot, the specific scotoma in the visual field that corresponds to the lack of light-detecting photoreceptor cells on the optic disc
- Optic disc, also known as the anatomical blind spot, the specific region of the retina where the optic nerve and blood vessels pass through to connect to the back of the eye
- Vehicle blind spot, areas outside of a vehicle that cannot be seen while looking forward, backward or through optical aids

== Books ==
- Blindspot (comics), a fictional character in the Marvel Comics universe
- The Blind Spot (1921), an early science fiction novel by Homer Eon Flint and Austin Hall

== Visual media ==
=== Film ===
- The Blind Spot (1932 film), a British crime film
- Blind Spot (1947 film), an American mystery thriller film noir
- Blind Spot (1958 film), a British drama film
- Blind Spot, a 1993 film presentation in the Hallmark Hall of Fame
- Blind Spot, a 2008 documentary on peak oil by Adolfo Doring
- Blind Spot (2009 film), a Canadian drama film
- Blind Spot (2012 film), a Luxembourgish crime film
- Blind Spot (2015 film), a Chinese suspense thriller film
- Blind Spot (2017 film), a Belgian thriller film
- Blind Spot (2018 film), a Norwegian drama film
- Blind Spot (2024 film), an American documentary film
- Blind Spot (2025 film), an Indian crime thriller film
- Blind Spot: Hitler's Secretary (2002), an Austrian documentary film
- Blindspotting, a 2018 American film

=== Television ===
- Blindspot (TV series), a 2015 American drama TV series
- "Blind Spot" (Arrow), an episode of the TV series Arrow
- "Blind Spot" (Beverly Hills, 90210), an episode of the TV series Beverly Hills, 90210
- "Blind Spot" (Homeland), an episode of the TV series Homeland
- "Blind Spot" (Justified), an episode of the TV series Justified
- "Blind Spot" (Law & Order: Criminal Intent), an episode of Law & Order: Criminal Intent
- "Blind Spots" (Supergirl), an episode of Supergirl
- "Blindspots", an episode of Scream

== Music ==
- Blindspot (album), a 2013 album by Dan Michaelson and The Coastguards
- Blind Spot (EP), a 2016 release by Lush
- Blindspott, a New Zealand band
- "Blind Spot", a song by Stray Kids from the EP Rock-Star
- "Blind Spots", a song by C418 from the album Minecraft – Volume Beta
- "Blind Spot", a song by Bruce Springsteen from the Streets of Philadelphia Sessions album on Tracks II: The Lost Albums

== Other uses ==
- "Blind spot", one of four quadrants in the diagram of the Johari window, a self-help technique
- Blindspot (podcast), produced by WNYC Studios and The History Channel

== See also ==
- Bias blind spot, the tendency to recognize bias in others, but not oneself
- Blind spot monitor
- "And the Blind Spot", an episode of 2 Broke Girls
- In the Blind Spot, a 2023 film
- Im toten Winkel (disambiguation), German for 'In the blind spot'
- Lacuna (disambiguation)
