= Zen Café =

Finnish rock band

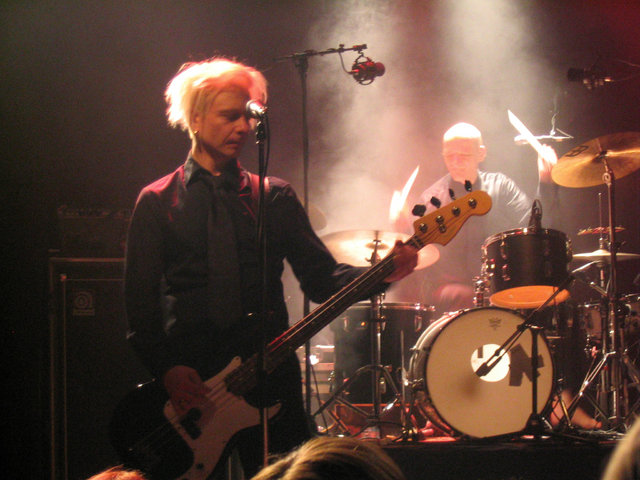
- Kari Nylander (bass) and Pete Parkkonen (drums) from Zen Café in Tavastia club, Helsinki, 2006-04-16.

Background information
- Origin: Turku, Finland
- Genres: Rock
- Years active: 1992–2008
- Members: Kari Nylander; Pete Parkkonen; Samuli Putro
- Past members: Tuomo Mäki-paavola; Mikko Oesch

Zen Café was a Finnish rock band that was founded in Turku in 1992. The band derived its name from the book Zen and the Art of Motorcycle Maintenance by Robert M. Pirsig at the suggestion of band's bassist Kari Nylander. Other original members were Samuli Putro (vocals, guitar), Mikko Oesch (guitar) and Tuomo Mäkipaavola (drums). Oesch soon left the group and Mäkipaavola was replaced by Pete Parkkonen (drums). Their latest album Stop was released in 2006, after which the band began a long hiatus without officially disbanding. According to Putro, it is unlikely that the band will ever return as Zen Café.

Meanwhile, band members are following their own personal projects. Lead vocalist Samuli Putro has released four solo albums, an EP, and a number of singles. Two of his albums have topped the Finnish albums chart.

== Members ==
Current line-up

- Samuli Putro – vocals, guitar, lyrics
- Kari Nylander – bass
- Pete Parkkonen – drums

Past members

- Mikko Oesch – guitar, vocals
- Tuomo Mäkipaavola – drums

== Current member biographies ==
=== Samuli Putro ===
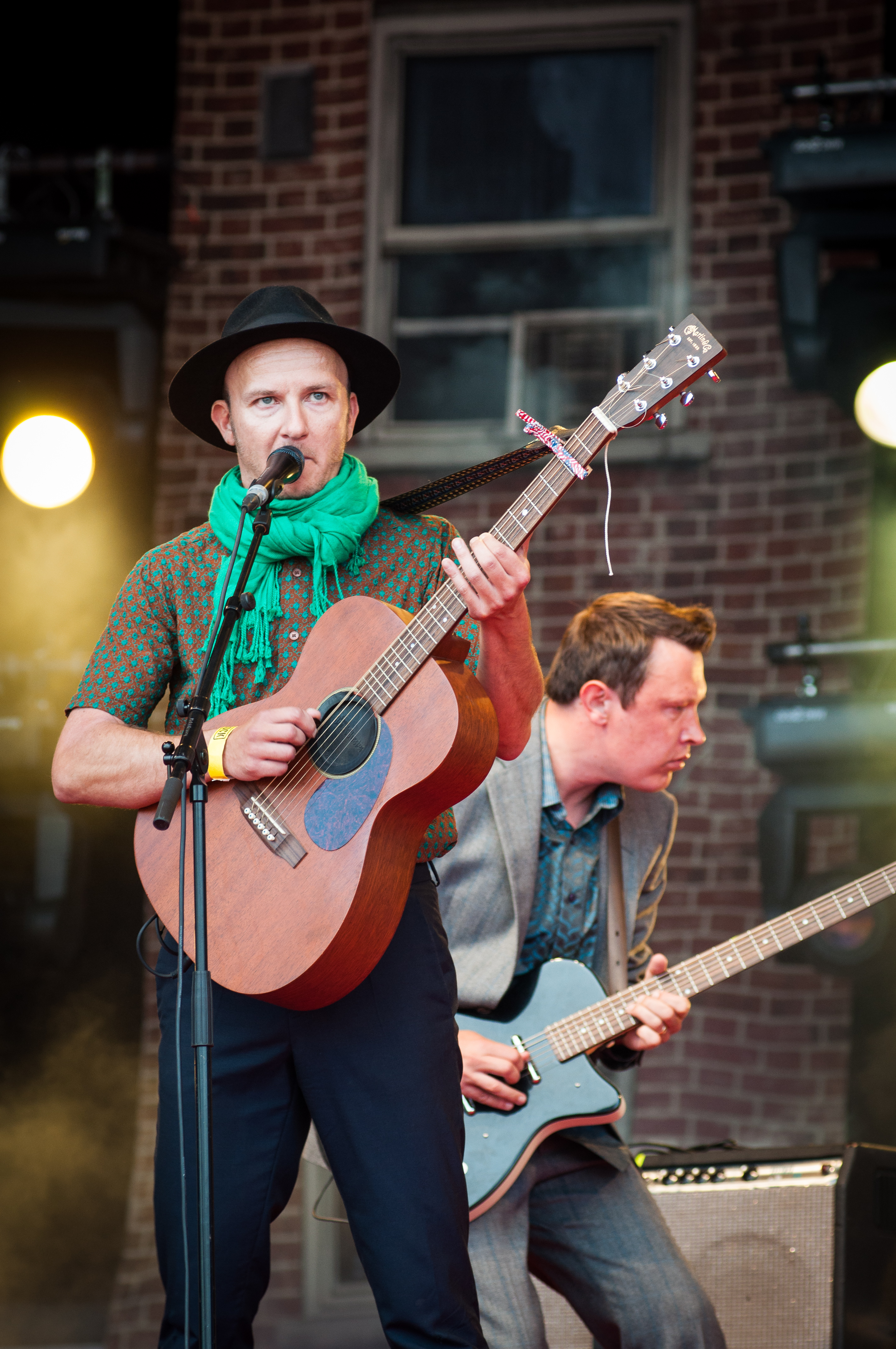
Samuli Putro

Samuli Tapani Putro (born in Helsinki on 21 August 1970) is a Finnish musician, vocalist and songwriter. His family moved to live in Raahe a short time after his birth. He was a founding member of Zen Café and its lead singer, guitarist and songwriter. Even while the band was very active, he pursued some personal projects including a solo EP released on 7 September 2004 titled Täysikasvuinen containing music from film soundtracks.

When the band went on a hiatus after 2006, he focused on developing a solo career. On 11 February 2009, he released his first solo studio album Elämä on juhla. In 2009, Putro composed the music for Mika Ronkainen's documentary film Freetime Machos. His second solo album, Älä sammu aurinko appeared on 16 March 2011 followed by Tavalliset hautajaiset on 24 August 2012. His eighth and most recent album Ikävä mummoa was released in 2023.

Samuli Putro was nominated for a Jussi Award for "Best Music" for his work in Menolippu Mombasaan (One-way ticket to Mombasa) in 2003.

In 2010 he was nominated for three awards during the Emma-gaala for his 2009 album Elämä on juhla. These were for "best debut album", "Best solo act" and "critics choice".

=== Kari Nylander ===
Kari Michael Nylander (born in Suomussalmi in 1971) is a Finnish musician, and the bass player in Zen Café bassist. He spent part of his childhood and youth in Raahe. In 1989, he moved to Turku, and was a founding member of the band.

=== Pete Parkkonen ===
Pete Parkkonen (born in Helsinki on November 4, 1964) is a Finnish drummer in Zen Café. Prior to becoming a member of the band, he had been in Kebas during the 1980s, in Toni Rossi's Sinitaivas-orchestra and in Inkvisitio whose debut album Paratiisi was released in 1989. In addition to the drums, Parkkonen plays percussion. Both his brothers Tom and Jussi are well-known drummers as well.

== Discography ==
=== Albums ===
Year	Album	English translation	Peak positions
Year	Album	English translation	FIN
1997	Romuna	Wrecked	
1998	Idiootti	Idiot	
1999	Ua ua		2
2001	Helvetisti järkeä	Hell of a lot of sense	1
2002	Vuokralainen	Tenant	1
2003	Jättiläinen	Giant	1
2005	Laiska, tyhmä ja saamaton	Lazy, stupid, and indolent	2
2006	Stop	Stop	1

=== Singles ===
Year	Single	Peak positions	Album
Year	Single	FIN	Album
2001	"Mies, jonka ympäriltä tuolit viedään"	17	
2002	"Aamuisin"	1	
2003	"Ihminen"	15	
2003	"Piha ilman sadettajaa"	2	
2004	"Tavallaan jokainen on surullinen"	10	
2005	"Taivas on kirkas ja napakka"	16	
2006	"Rakastele mua"	4	

== Discography: Samuli Putro ==
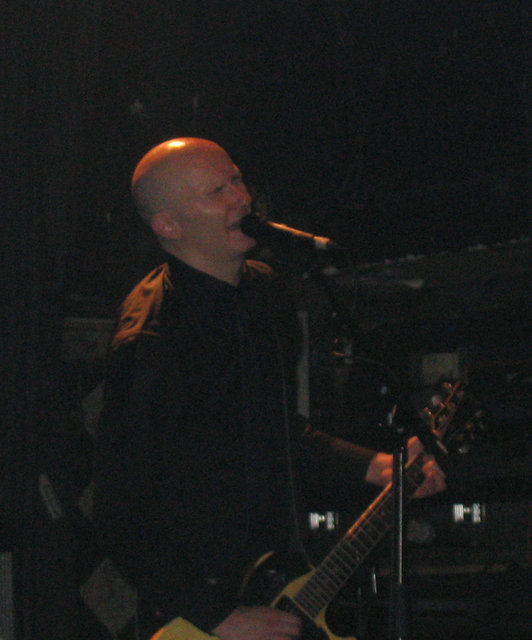
Samuli Putro, Tavastia Klubi, Helsinki, Finland, 16. April 2006

Albums

Year	Album	Peak positions
Year	Album	FIN
2009	Elämä on juhla	1
2011	Älä sammu aurinko	4
2012	Tavalliset hautajaiset	1
2014	Taitekohdassa	2

EPs

Year	Title	Peak positions
Year	Title	FIN
2004	EP	12

Singles

Year	Title	Peak positions	Album
Year	Title	FIN	Album
2012	"Olet puolisoni nyt"	12	

Featured in

Year	Title	Peak positions	Album
Year	Title	FIN	Album
2007	"Avoin kirje" (Näkä & Co feat. Tumppi Varonen & Samuli Putro)	2	

== See also ==
- List of best-selling music artists in Finland
