= Sudden Fiction =

Sudden Fiction may refer to:

- Sudden Fiction (album), a 2011 album by Dan Michaelson and The Coastguards
- Sudden Fiction (short-story collection), a 1986 collection of short stories
- Sudden Fiction (Continued), a 1996 collection of short stories
