= All the Sins =

Finnish crime drama television series

- English poster
- Finnish: Kaikki synnit
- Genre: Crime drama; Detective; Mystery; Family drama
- Created by: Mika Ronkainen; Merja Aakko
- Written by: Mika Ronkainen; Merja Aakko
- Directed by: Mika Ronkainen
- Starring: Johannes Holopainen; Maria Sid; Matti Ristinen; Jaakko Ohtonen
- Opening theme: Aino Venna: War Song
- Composer: Jussi Jaakonaho
- Country of origin: Finland
- Original language: Finnish
- No. of seasons: 3
- No. of episodes: 18

Production
- Executive producer: Alan Sim
- Producer: Ilkka Matila
- Production locations: Oulu region, Finland
- Cinematography: Jani Kumpulainen
- Editor: Tambet Tasuja
- Running time: 45 minutes
- Production company: MRP Matila Röhr Productions

Original release
- Network: Elisa Viihde
- Release: 5 April 2019 – 15 January 2023

All the Sins (Finnish: Kaikki synnit) is a Finnish crime drama television series created and written by film director Mika Ronkainen and screenwriter-journalist Merja Aakko. The series is set in a deeply religious Laestadian Lutheran community in northern Finland. The series was mainly shot in the Oulu region, northern Finland.

The first season of the series, commissioned by Elisa Viihde, premiered in Finland in April 2019 and the second season in October 2020. The third and final season of All the Sins was released in Finland in December 2022, and internationally in 2023.

== Plot ==
=== Season 1 ===
After leaving home 10 years ago, detective Lauri Räihä is sent to investigate the murders of two men in the small northern Finnish town where he grew up. The investigation offers a way to escape couples' therapy and his failing relationship with his husband. But going home forces him to face his family and the deeply religious Laestadian community that rejected him many years previously. Together with his partner, Sanna Tervo, a carefree soul on the surface, but also someone who has their own difficult past, Lauri seeks answers to the case only to discover other truths about himself, his home town, and whether one has the power to forgive all sins.

=== Season 2 ===
Set in 1999, fifteen years before the story of season 1, Jussi Ritola, police officer in a small town of Varjakka in Northern Finland, starts to investigate the death of two of his wife's colleagues. The victims had been developing a revolutionary touch screen technology in the company of a local businessman and member of the town's conservative religious community. The whole town has got to take part in the international technology boom. As Ritola investigates the deaths of the couple, the religious community starts to protect its members. The community is also shaken by a movement led by women that has landed in the town and is preaching the dawning of a new age. The millennium is nearing its end and an obscure atmosphere of expectation hovers over everything, while Ritola's murder investigation leads his personal life and the entire town into a crisis.

=== Season 3 ===
The detectives Lauri Räihä and Sanna Tervo - who are each in the middle of very personal crises - return to Varjakka to investigate the murder of the former county constable five years after the serial killer was murdering laestadian men last time. In the search of a copycat they are helped by police officer Jussi Ritola, who is burdened by his own fraud from the past.

== Awards and nominations ==
In January 2019, the first season of All the Sins was awarded with Nordisk Film & TV Fond Prize at Gothenburg Film Festival in Sweden "for outstanding writing of a Nordic drama series". The series was nominated for Golden Eye Award for Best International Series at Zurich Film Festival in October 2019.
