= Schmotime =

Studio album by Absentee
- Released: August 27, 2006
- Recorded: 2006
- Venue: Memphis
- Genre: Indie rock
- Length: 41:00
- Label: Memphis Industries
- Producer: James Ford

Professional ratings
Review scores
Source	Rating
AllMusic	3.5/5 stars
Drowned in Sound	8/10
Pitchfork	7.1/10
Stylus Magazine	B

Schmotime is the debut album by indie rock band Absentee, released in 2006.

== Critical reception ==
PopMatters wrote that "Schmotime presents a wry look at a world that's filled with people destroying themselves and each other."

== Description ==
This debut full-length from Brit indie-country-rock quintet followed up their 2005 'Donkey Stock' mini-album. Spinning folky tales of love, loss and elegant debauchery over a backdrop of steel guitar, keyboards, harmonica, sweet backing vocals and the occasional stab of distortion, they were compared to Pavement and Tindersticks and secured a slot at 2005's cult Green Man Festival.

== Track listing ==
1. "More Troubles"
2. "We Should Never Have Children"
3. "Getaway"
4. "Hey Tramp"
5. "You Try Sober"
6. "There's A Body In A Car Somewhere"
7. "Weasel"
8. "Truth Is Stranger Than Fishin'"
9. "Duck Train"
10. "Something To Bang"
11. "Treacle"

== Personnel ==
- Dan Michaelson - vocals
