= Mitchell Berman =

Mitchell or Mitch Berman may refer to:

- Mitch Berman (born 1956), American fiction writer
- Mitchell N. Berman, American legal scholar
- Mitchell Berman (politician) (born 1986), American nurse and U.S. Representative-elect from Wisconsin
