= Im toten Winkel =

Im toten Winkel (German for 'In the blind spot') may refer to:

- Im toten Winkel – Hitlers Sekretärin or Blind Spot: Hitler's Secretary, a 2002 Austrian documentary film
- Im toten Winkel (2023 film) or In the Blind Spot, a 2023 German thriller film
- Tatort: Im toten Winkel, a 2018 TV film produced by X Filme Creative Pool

== See also ==
- Blind spot (disambiguation)
