= Fanseat =

On-demand sports streaming service

- Website type: OTT video streaming platform
- Available in: English; Spanish; French; Italian; Czech; Swedish; Norwegian
- Area served: Worldwide
- Key people: Tobias Osmund (CEO, Spring Media); Jean-Maël Gineste (Managing Director, Fanseat)
- Parent: Spring Media
- Website: www.fanseat.com
- Registration: Required
- Launched: 2015; 11 years ago
- Current status: Active

Fanseat 1–4 (television)
- Country: Finland
- Broadcast area: Nationwide

Programming
- Language: Finnish

Ownership
- Owner: Elisa Oyj

History
- Launched: June 12, 2015; 11 years ago (Fanseat 1 and 2)
- Closed: February 15, 2017; 9 years ago
- Replaced by: Elisa Viihde Sport 1–8

Fanseat is an Internet streaming service specializing in live sports broadcasts, established in 2015. Early on, it served as an online extension of Fanseat 1 and 2 (later Fanseat 1 to 4), basic tier television channels available to customers of Finnish telecommunications provider Elisa. In 2017, the Fanseat channels were renamed and merged into a new 8-channel premium tier called Elisa Viihde Sport. The online version of Fanseat remained its own brand, and was refocused on foreign markets.
In 2019, the platform was acquired by Spring Media, a Swedish sports marketing agency. Fanseat's managing director is Jean-Maël Gineste, a former sales director at Eurosport.

Fanseat mostly caters to small-market sports leagues, but has also held out-of-market rights to some internationally recognized properties. Most events are available through a monthly subscription, with select programming being offered on pay-per-view basis.

Fanseat can be viewed via web browsers on PC and Mac, as well as apps on Apple iOS and Android devices.

== Programming ==
Broadcasts are restricted to specific regions per the terms of each rights agreement, unless otherwise noted.

=== Basketball ===
- National Basketball League
- Chinese Basketball Association
- Basketligaen (worldwide)
- LNB Pro A
- Basketball Bundesliga
- Lietuvos krepšinio lyga
- Liga ACB

=== Football ===
- 2022 FIFA World Cup Asian Qualifiers
- AFC Champions League
- AFC Cup
- Damallsvenskan
- UAE Pro League

=== Ice hockey ===
- Champions Hockey League
- Ekstraliga
- Extraliga
- Ligue Magnus
- Latvijas Virslīgas

=== Motorsports ===
- Ligue Nationale de Speedway (worldwide)
- Speedway GB Premiership
- ElitSpeedway Sweden

=== Other ===
- MCA T20 Super Series

Fanseat television channels alternate logo

== Former programming ==
=== Basketball ===
- 2017 FIBA EuroBasket Qualifiers (select teams)
- Basketball Champions League
- FIBA Europe Cup
- VTB United League
- Pro Basketball League
- Korisliiga
- Svenska Basketligan

=== Football ===
- 2016 UEFA Euro Qualifiers
- 2015 UEFA European Under-21 Championship
- Superliga
- Meistriliiga
- Naisten Liiga
- Ykkonen
- Allsvenskan

=== Ice Hockey ===
- 2018 Women's Olympic Qualifiers (select teams)
- Mestis
- 1. Hokejova Liga
- Swedish Hockey League

=== Team handball ===
- BENE-League Handball

=== Volleyball ===
- Lentopallon Mestaruusliiga

=== Other ===
- IFF Champions Cup
- Euro Floorball Tour
- 2017 ELF European Box Lacrosse Championships
- 2017 IIHF Inline Hockey World Championships
- Salibandyliiga
- National Lacrosse League
