= Finnish Blood Swedish Heart =

- Official international poster
- Directed by: Mika Ronkainen
- Produced by: Ulla Simonen
- Cinematography: Vesa Taipaleenmäki
- Edited by: Åsa Mossberg
- Production company: Klaffi Productions
- Release dates: 23 September 2012 (Nordisk Panorama); 22 March 2013 (Sweden); 5 April 2013 (Finland)
- Running time: 90 minutes
- Countries: Finland; Sweden
- Languages: Finnish; Swedish

Finnish Blood Swedish Heart is a 2013 documentary film by Mika Ronkainen about a Finnish father and son revisiting their former home in Sweden. The film won two Jussi Awards (Finnish Oscars) in 2014: Best Documentary and Best Music, and the Dragon Award for Best Nordic Documentary Film at the Göteborg Film Festival in February 2013.

The film was released theatrically in Sweden with the title Ingen riktig finne (lit. 'No real Finn') on 22 March 2013, and in Finland (titled Laulu koti-ikävästä) on 5 April 2013.

== Reviews ==
- Alissa Simon (2013-02-18). "Review: Finnish Blood Swedish Heart". Variety.
