= Mitch Berman =

American writer (born 1956)

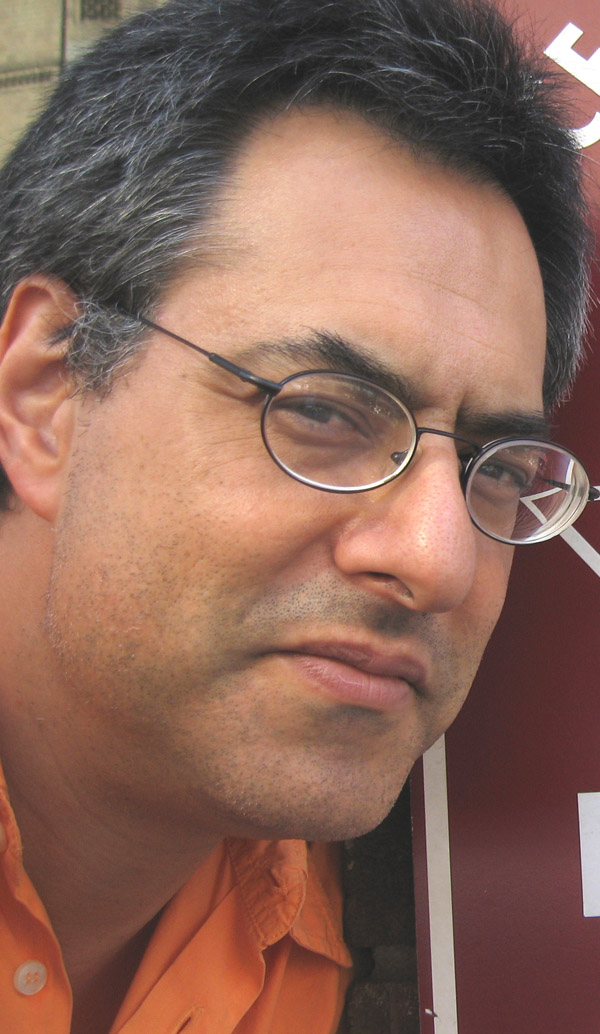
- Mitch Berman
- Born: May 29, 1956 (age 70); Los Angeles, California, U.S.
- Education: University of California, Berkeley; Columbia University
- Occupation: Writer
- Website: mitchberman.com

Mitch Berman (born May 29, 1956) is an American fiction writer known for his imaginative range, exploration of characters beyond the margins of society, lush prose style and dark humor.

== Time Capsule ==
Berman's novel Time Capsule, the tale of a jazz saxophonist's journey across a post-apocalyptic America, was nominated by its publisher, Putnam, for the Hemingway Foundation/PEN Award and the Pulitzer Prize. A New York Times "New and Noteworthy Book", the novel evoked comparisons with Mark Twain's Huckleberry Finn, and the musicality of its author's style was noted by many critics, including Fanny Howe in The New York Times, the San Diego Union ("a pied piper laying down a hypnotic line of patter"), the San Francisco Chronicle ("reminiscent of a Thelonius Monk solo"), and Kurt Vonnegut ("high-intensity jazz for the very sharpest of readers"). Carolyn See, in the Los Angeles Times, hailed "a brave and heartening book" and the author's "absolutely perfect ear for dialogue." The novel's editor was the late Faith Sale, who also worked with Kurt Vonnegut, Joseph Heller, Thomas Pynchon, Amy Tan and Kazuo Ishiguro.

== Short stories ==
Berman's stories span an eclectic array of characters, settings and circumstances:

- In "Wabi", a young rock guitarist, hammered into a coma by skinheads, awakens with no short-term memory to discover that his father has had a sex-change operation
- In "Immoral Woman", a long-dead Shanghai silent film star escorts a contemporary movie critic to an unearthly realm of memory and regret
- In "To Be Horst", a down-and-out passerby, mistaken by a young girl for her blind date, transforms himself into the man for whom he was mistaken
- In "Scenes from the Films of Konkowsky as Recalled by the Executor of his Estate", a director caught in a devastating fire chooses to perish in his film vault along with his creations
- In "The Death of Nu-Nu", an old man, invisible in Greenwich Village, grades imperceptibly into death

Berman's stories, nominated for seven Pushcart Prizes, have been named to two special mentions in the Pushcart Prizes and a one in The Best American Short Stories. Major anthologies in which his work is represented include Pow Wow: Charting the Fault Lines in the American Experience, Voices of the Xiled: A Generation Speaks for Itself, The Male Body, and Sudden Fiction (Continued).

== Nonfiction ==
Berman has also written nonfiction on a wide variety of subjects. With Susanne Lee, he went to Beijing to cover the violent crackdown on the Tiananmen Square protests of 1989 for the Village Voice. His Los Angeles Times Magazine profile of the world chess champions, Garry Kasparov and Anatoly Karpov, received special mention in the first Best American Sports Writing, edited by David Halberstam and Glenn Stout. With Susanne Lee, he served as co-freelance editor of Children of the Dragon: The Story of Tiananmen Square (essays and photographs from the student movement), reviewed several books on the crackdown, among them one by Harrison Salisbury for The Nation, and, for the Los Angeles Times Magazine, profiled jazz drummer Max Roach. He has also reviewed the works of science fiction authors Harlan Ellison and Ray Bradbury for the Los Angeles Times Book Review.

== Biography ==
Born in Los Angeles and raised in Southern California and Eugene, Oregon, Berman graduated in 1979 from the University of California at Berkeley. Encouraged by Ishmael Reed and Russell Banks, he graduated from the MFA Program in Writing at Columbia University in 1991. He has taught at the University of Texas at Austin and SUNY Purchase, where he served as the first holder of the Royal and Shirley Durst Chair in Literature.

== Publications ==
- "Billy Moscow and Me", a short story, Descant, Winter 2008
- Sensory Impact, May 2007, by the winners of the 2007 Arts Council Silicon Valley Artists' Fellowships in Fiction, May 2007 [previously unpublished novel extract anthologized]
- "The Death of Nu-Nu", a short story, TriQuarterly, Fall 2000 (special Millennium issue) [two Pushcart Prize nominations] [named one of the "100 Distinguished Short Stories of 2000" in Best American Short Stories 2001, Barbara Kingsolver, ed., Katrina Kenison, series ed.]
- "A Walk in the Park", a short story, Southwest Review, Fall 1999
- "A Story of Many Titles", a short story, AGNI, Spring 1995; reprinted in Temenos, 2001
- "To These Guys", a short story, Witness, November 1994 [Special Mention, Pushcart Prize XX: 1996: Best of the Small Presses; Pushcart Prize nominee, 1996]
- "The Board", a short story, Confrontation, Fall 1994
- "Voice-Over for the Documentary Scenes from the Films of Konkowsky as Recalled by the Executor of his Estate", a short story, Boulevard, Fall 1994 [Pushcart Prize nominee, 1996]
- "The Urbane", a short story, Brooklyn Review, Summer 1994
- "Wabi", a short story, Chicago Review, Fall 1993 [Pushcart Prize nominee, 1994; anthologized in Voices of the Xiled, a collection by Generation X fiction writers, Doubleday, 1994]
- Two haiku, Modern Haiku, June 1994
- "To Be Horst", a short story, Michigan Quarterly Review, Fall 1993 [anthologized in Sudden Fiction (Continued), a collection of short-short stories, Robert Shapard and James Thomas, editors, W.W. Norton, 1996 (cloth and paper); also anthologized in The Male Body, a collection of stories, essays and poems, Laurence Goldstein, editor, University of Michigan Press, 1994 (cloth) and 1995 (paper)]
- "The Making of The Making of the Illusion of Gravity", a short story, Boulevard, Summer 1993
- "The Day My Fingers Stopped", a short story, The Antioch Review, Fall 1992
- "The Poorest Boy in Chicago", a short story, Southwest Review, Fall 1992 (Special Mention), Pushcart Prize XVIII: 1993–1994: Best of the Small Presses; Pushcart Prize nominee, 1993; anthologized in Powwow: American Short Fiction from Then to Now, 2009, Da Capo/Perseus, hardcover and softcover, Ishmael Reed, Carla Blank, editors
- "Malmö", a short story, Boulevard, Spring 1992 [Pushcart Prize nominee, 1993]
- Interview with an Angel, a novella, The Gettysburg Review, Winter 1991
- "From Be-Bop to Hip-Hop", a profile of jazz drummer Max Roach, Los Angeles Times Magazine, September 15, 1991
- "Orwell's Bells", an eyewitness account of China's 1989 student movement, Conjunctions, May 1991
- "J.P. Morgan Meets Kasparov", an article on chess hustlers in Washington Square Park, Smart magazine, January 1991
- "Enemies: A Chess Story", a profile of world chess champions Kasparov and Karpov, Los Angeles Times Magazine, October 7, 1990 (reprinted, The Age, Melbourne, Australia, January 1991) [Selected for Notable Sports Writing, The Best American Sports Writing 1991, David Halberstam, ed., Glenn Stout, series ed.]
- Children of the Dragon: The Story of Tiananmen Square, a collection of eyewitness accounts of and historical essays about the 1989 Chinese student movement, Collier/Macmillan, 1990 [co-editor; several editors]
- "Getting the Story on China", review of five books of nonfiction, Mother Jones, July 1990
- "Is China Still Hopeful?" book review of Mu & Thompson's Crisis at Tiananmen, The Nation, 1990
- "Very Quiet. Too Quiet", book review of Harrison Salisbury's Tiananmen Diary, The Nation, October 30, 1989
- "Sweets from Harlan Ellison", book review of Ellison's Angry Candy (short story collection), Los Angeles Times Book Review, 1989
- "Bullets in Beijing", eyewitness account of the crackdown in Tiananmen Square, The Village Voice, June 20, 1989
- "The Bradbury Chronicles", book review of Ray Bradbury's The Toynbee Convector, Los Angeles Times Book Review, 1988
- Time Capsule, a novel, Putnam, 1987 (cloth); Ballantine Books, 1988 (paper) [A New York Times New and Noteworthy Book; nominated by Putnam for the PEN/Hemingway Award and the Pulitzer Prize]
