= Molly Giles =

American writer

Molly Giles (born in 1942) is an American short story writer, novelist, and professor at the University of Arkansas. She formerly taught at San Francisco State University. She is the author of Creek Walk and Other Stories (ISBN 0-684-85287-X) published in 1997 and the novels The Home for Unwed Husbands (ISBN 978-1948585552) published in 2023 and Iron Shoes (ISBN 0-641-71965-5) published in 2000. Her story collection Rough Translations won the Flannery O'Connor Award for Short Fiction. In 2020, her short story collection Wife With Knife won the Leapfrog Press Global Fiction Prize Contest and in 2022, the short story from that collection, "Bad Dog" won a Pushcart Prize (ISBN 978-1948585293). She also appears in Sudden Fiction (Continued) (60 New Short-Short Stories). Her short stories have been translated into Spanish.

== Awards ==
- Flannery O'Connor Award for Short Fiction
- Leapfrog Global Fiction Prize 2020
- Pushcart Prize 2022
