= Babak Ganjei =

English artist and illustrator (born 1978)

- Born: 1978 (age 46–47); London
- Occupation(s): artist, illustrator

Babak Ganjei (born 1978) is an English artist and illustrator based in London. He is known for his humorous and confessional text-based paintings.

After graduating from Central Saint Martins in 2001, the first decade of his career was spent playing in bands and creating comics. He was a member of the band Absentee for six years.

Alongside comic books, Ganjei has published two titles with Rough Trade Books: one consisting of his film ideas, and another, Art Is The Thing Nobody Asked You To Do, which the publisher describes as "a radical new take on the artists' manifesto".

He has created short films for Channel 4 and production company Blink, and featured in two BBC Radio 4 programmes with his son Arthur.

== Early life and education ==
Ganjei was born in London in 1978, after his parents moved from Iran the year before. He grew up around Primrose Hill until moving to Bournemouth at the age of eleven. He has described this move as "a bit like suddenly being the only ethnics in the town" and as "guaranteeing that our teenage years were spent understanding what it is to be an outsider". He started drawing at a young age, as his mother was a painter, and his father an architect.

Ganjei studied at Central Saint Martins in London. He graduated in 2001 with a degree in fine arts, according to an oil-painted CV he exhibited in 2018.

== Career ==
According to Hannah Silver writing for Wallpaper, the decade after Ganjei graduated was spent playing in bands and creating comics. Ganjei has described the years 2005 to 2011 as when he "join[ed] bands to be broke in a gang". During this period, he published the comic book Hilarious Consequences (2010), and played in the band Absentee for six years. They were signed to Memphis Industries, and released their final album in 2008. Ganjei and two other members of Absentee were also in the band Wet Paint.

In 2014, Ganjei received coverage from Daily Express, The Independent, Metro, and BBC Radio 5 Live for auctioning some twigs on eBay alongside other unusual items like handwritten "Fresh Prince of Bel Air" lyrics. The same year, he published Babak Ganjei's Roadhouse, a graphic novel based on the 1989 Patrick Swayze film Road House. It was described as "astonishingly good" by Aaron Souppouris of The Verge.

In 2017, Channel 4's short-film series Random Acts featured Ganjei's satirical animated comedy Taste of Your Own Food, about dating in supermarkets. He has also produced the short films Waiting for Potato and Freelancer with production company Blink.

In 2018, Ganjei exhibited a solo show, It's Really Not Funny, at London's War Gallery. Works displayed in this show included an oil-painted CV, and a painting of his Barclaycard. He tried to sell the painting to Barclays, but they did not purchase it and suggested he cancel his card for security reasons.

He also published his first book with Rough Trade Books, Film Ideas. The concept for the book originated when Ganjei was retweeted by comedian Rob Delaney, and was consequently followed on Twitter by a number of film producers. Ganjei then started tweeting film ideas.

In 2019, Ganjei featured in the BBC Radio 4 programme Can My Eleven Year Old Fix My Life? with his son Arthur. When Arthur turned 12, this was followed with another programme, Arthur Cares, in which he acted as an agony uncle and dressed his father up as a dinosaur to promote his father's art.

In 2021, fashion boutique Browns showed a selection of Ganjei's neons and works on paper in their Shoreditch store in an exhibition called Honey Wagon. Ganjei described the structure of the show as being like a band playing a set full of greatest hits. That year he also published his second book with Rough Trade, Art Is The Thing Nobody Asked You To Do, which the publisher describes as "a radical new take on the artists' manifesto". In 2021 Ganjei also designed a commission for Liverpool's Bluecoat gallery.

He would work with the Bluecoat again for a 2024 solo show, Thanks for Having Me. This included a section entitled "Greatest Hits". The gallery described Ganjei's exhibition as "reflecting back on a life of operating on the margins and never quite being sure where he belongs".

As part of a promotion for the soft drink Irn-Bru, Ganjei exhibited his work in The BEEP Show. This consisted of word art paintings inspired by awkward or embarrassing text messages people have sent, and was shown in November 2024 at pop-up galleries in London and Edinburgh.

Ganjei hosts a show, Hot Mess, on NTS Radio.

== Style and influences ==
Ganjei describes his early influences as the band Nirvana, and the punk / DIY aesthetic. His work is frequently confessional and humorous. He is noted for his text-based paintings, which Dazed described as "reading like fragments of a diary or notebook while often exposing the mechanisms of their own production ('This art takes about 15-20 min') or revealing snippets of dialogue from his interior monologue ('I'm in the bush outside and I really love you')".

Emily Gosling writing for It's Nice That described his paintings of sitting rooms from sitcoms as having a naive style. Gosling also described his illustrations of acts playing London's Vision festival, including Camera Obscura, Fat White Family, Holy Fuck and Jens Lekman, as "sweet doodlings".

A review of his Bluecoat show for Art in Liverpool described the exhibition of a letter to a friend with the line "I could keep going but there's a part of me that is already thinking I need to keep this snappy in case it is published or printed on a wall" as "performance [art] of the self in a uniquely dishonest form".
