= Judy Troy =

American novelist

Judy Troy (born 1951) is a professor emerita at Auburn University, as well as a short story writer and novelist. Before becoming writer-in-residence at Auburn, she taught at Indiana University Bloomington and the University of Missouri. She received a 1996 Whiting Award.

Her work includes "Ramone" appearing in The Habit of Art : Best Stories from the Indiana University Fiction Workshop (ISBN 0-253-21807-1) published 1996 and Ten Miles West of Venus (ISBN 0-385-33288-2; ISBN 0-679-45153-6) published 1997. She also has a story in Sudden Fiction (Continued) (60 New Short-Short Stories). Other published works include West of Venus, From the Black Hills (ISBN 0-375-50230-0) and Mourning Doves: Stories (ISBN 0-684-19369-8). Mourning Doves was nominated for a Los Angeles Times Book Award.

Troy attended Munster High School in 1969. She has a B.A. from the University of Illinois Chicago in 1976 and an M.A. from Indiana University in 1981.
