= Mieskuoro Huutajat =

Finnish male choir

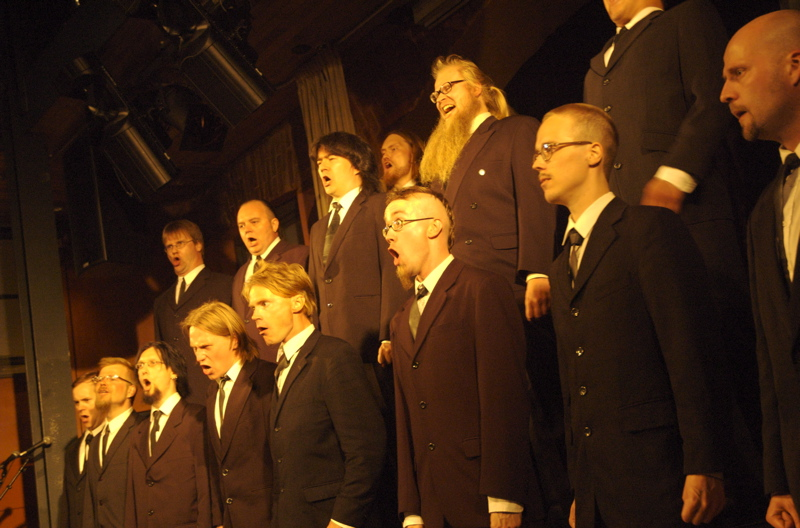
Mieskuoro Huutajat

Mieskuoro Huutajat (Screaming Men) is an internationally famous shouting choir from Oulu, Finland. They were established in 1987 and originally comprised 20 shouting men, since expanded to 30.

Led by conductor Petri Sirviö, the choir is best known for their loud renditions of Finnish patriotic songs, but have also performed foreign tunes such as The Star-Spangled Banner.

They were guest performers at Congratulations, a special 50th anniversary concert for the Eurovision Song Contest held in Copenhagen, Denmark in October 2005, at which they performed Waterloo. Co-host Renars Kaupers suggested jokingly that perhaps Finland's notoriously poor performances at Eurovision in future could be remedied by the choir performing their own songs. This suggestion was somewhat ironic, as Finland won the subsequent contest.

The performances show some similarities to the traditional Māori's haka war cries.

== Documentary film ==
Screaming Men
- Directed by: Mika Ronkainen
- Produced by: Kimmo Paananen
- Cinematography: Vesa Taipaleenmäki
- Edited by: Pernille Bech Christensen
- Music by: Olli Tuomainen, Petri Sirviö
- Distributed by: Trust Film Sales
- Release date: 2003
- Running time: 76 min.
- Country: Finland
- Languages: Finnish, English

The choir was portrayed in a documentary film Screaming Men, released in 2003, directed by Mika Ronkainen.

Mieskuoro Huutajat participated in the performance of Carmen, by the Spanish flamenco dancer Israel Galván, at the Philharmonie de Paris, on November 1 and 2, 2025.
