= Maria Kwiatkowsky =

German actress

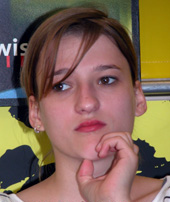
Kwiatkowsky in 2004

Maria Kwiatkowsky (April 23, 1985 – July 4, 2011) was a German film, stage, and television actress. She is best known for her leading role in Ayşe Polat's film En Garde (2004).

Maria Kwiatkowsky died on July 4, 2011, during filming, at the age of 26 in her Berlin apartment from a cocaine overdose.

== Selected filmography ==
List of film credits
Year	Title	Role	Notes
2004	En Garde	Alice	Won Best Actress Award
2008	Tatort	Sabrina	TV series
2008	Torstrasse Intimate	Paff Meisi	Internet-Sitcom
2010	Carlos	informatrice stasi	miniseries
2010	Stolberg	Lisa Mildes	TV series
2010	Leipzig Homicide	Conny Libscher	TV series
2012	Polizeiruf 110	Jessica Schulz	TV series
2013	The Invention of Love	Emily Schenk	
