= Vinterland (film) =

- Directed by: Hisham Zaman
- Written by: Kjell Ola Dahl; Hisham Zaman
- Produced by: Turid Øversveen
- Starring: Raouf Saraj; Shler Rahnoma
- Music by: Øistein Boassen
- Release date: 2007
- Running time: 52 minutes
- Country: Norway
- Languages: Kurdish, Norwegian

Vinterland is a 2007 film directed by Hisham Zaman and produced in Norway.

== Plot ==
Renas, a Kurdish refugee living in the northern part of Norway in a remote desolate place, is awaiting the arrival of his fiancée, Fermesk. The couple have never met before, and their first encounter at the airport does not meet up to their expectations.

== Reviews ==
The film was given a grant of 1.5 million kr in early 2006, and was selected as the opener for the 2007 Tromsø International Film Festival.

The film was reviewed by all major newspapers, receiving a "die throw" of 5 out of 6 in Aftenposten and Dagbladet, and 4 in VG and Nordlys

== Awards ==
- Best Actor (Årets mannlige skuespiller), Raouf Saraj, Amanda Awards, Norway, 2007.
- Grand Prix José Giovanni, Festival International Du Film De Montagne D'Autrans, France, 2007.

== See also ==
- Cinema of Norway
