= Hisham Zaman =

Kurdish-Norwegian film director

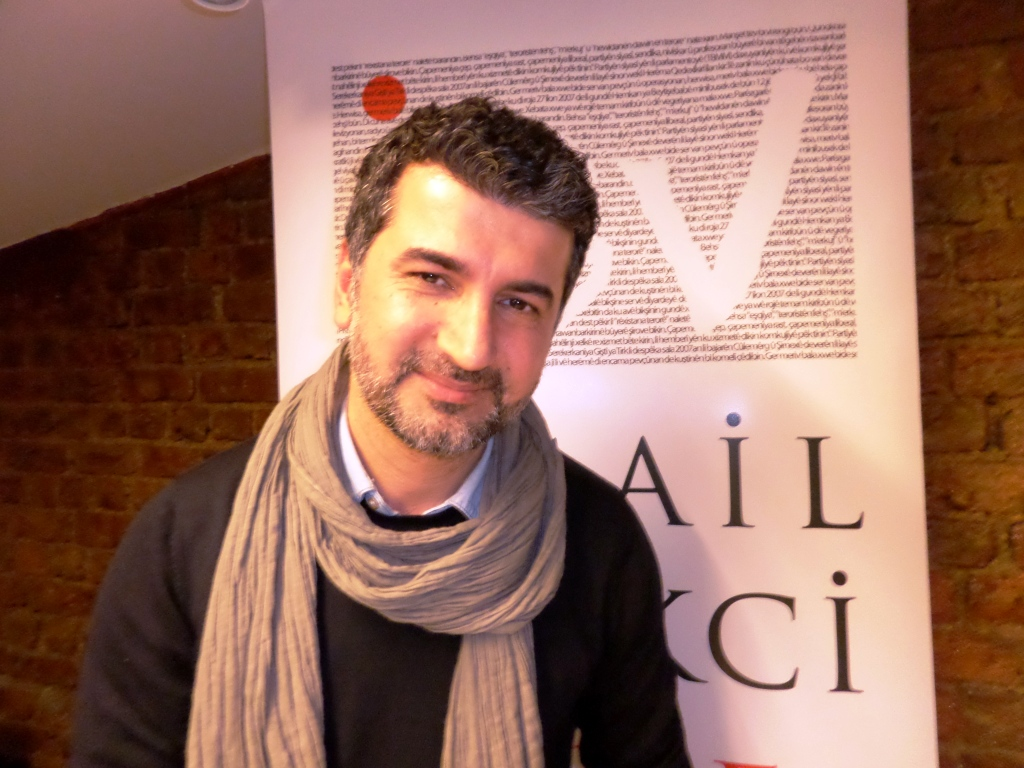
- Hisham Zaman
- Born: 1975 (age 50–51); Kirkuk, Iraq
- Citizenship: Norwegian
- Education: Norwegian Film School
- Alma mater: Norwegian Film School, Lillehammer
- Occupations: Film Director, Screenwriter
- Years active: 2004–present
- Known for: Director of Bawke, Before Snowfall
- Notable work: Bawke, Before Snowfall, The Roof

Hisham Zaman (born 1 February 1975) is a Norwegian film director and screenwriter of Kurdish origin. He graduated from the Norwegian Film School at Lillehammer in 2004. His films center on the stories and inner dilemmas of characters united by a common refugee experience, exploring human themes such as love, acceptance, sacrifice, revenge, loyalty and honour. He has co-written several of his scripts with the Norwegian crime novelist Kjell Ola Dahl.

Zaman's breakthrough film, Bawke, won more than 40 national and international awards. He is also a two-time winner of the Dragon Award for Best Nordic Film, the only filmmaker to have been awarded this distinction two years in a row.

== Early life ==
Zaman was born in Kirkuk, Iraq in 1975. When he was 10 years old, he was forced to flee the country with his parents and siblings. The family spent several years as refugees in Iran and Turkey, hiding from the authorities to evade arrest. They were eventually granted political asylum in Norway, where Zaman arrived at the age of 17.

Although he had an early interest in filmmaking, Zaman was told by his father that ‘cinema will not put food on the table.’ However, his mother used to let him and his cousins go to the cinema without his father’s knowledge. After arriving in Norway, Zaman ‘took his father’s advice and began working as a car mechanic for Toyota to support his family. In the evenings, however, he explored his passion for filmmaking by joining an amateur cinema club and using rented and borrowed equipment to begin making his own films.

In 2001, Zaman was accepted to the Norwegian Film School at Lillehammer, from which he graduated in 2004. His diploma film, The Roof, played in a number of international film festivals. The Bridge, a short film he shot with his classmates, was awarded The Norwegian Playwright’s Association’s Award for Best Screenplay at the Norwegian Short Film Festival in 2003.

== Career ==
=== Bawke (2005) ===
Zaman received widespread critical acclaim for his breakthrough short film, Bawke. The 15-minute film tells the story of a father, an undocumented Kurdish refugee making a dangerous journey across Europe, who is forced to choose between two evils for the sake of his young son.

Bawke was screened at the Sundance Film Festival and was nominated for the Prix UIP for Best European Short Film at the European Film Awards. It received more than 40 other awards at festivals around the world, including the prestigious Clermont-Ferrand International Short Film Festival in 2005. It also received an Amanda Award, the Norwegian equivalent of the Oscars, for Best Short Film the same year. In 2010, it was named the best short film of the last decade in a poll by Norwegian film magazine Rushprint.

The film is dedicated "to all those leaving their native countries and their roots and language in search of a better life.”

=== Winterland (2007) ===
Zaman’s next film was Winterland, a mid-length comedy about a Kurdish man living in remote Northern Norway, who enters into an arranged marriage with a woman from his home country whom he has never met. Winterland was selected as the opening film for the Tromsø International Film Festival in 2007 and won an Amanda Award for Best Actor.

=== Before Snowfall (2013) ===
Zaman’s debut feature film, Before Snowfall, is a road movie that tells the story of a young man who sets out on a quest to avenge his family’s honour after his sister runs away from an arranged marriage. Before Snowfall was filmed over a period of two years, and shot in four different countries.

Before Snowfall has been called a “dazzling drama about the shifting definitions of family, love, and honor.” The film opened the Tromsø International Film Festival in 2013 and was the most award-winning Norwegian film that year. It won the Dragon Award for Best Nordic Film at the Gothenburg Film Festival for its “original and honest vision that goes beyond clichés.” It also won the award for Best Cinematography in a Narrative Feature Film at the Tribeca Film Festival. According to the comments given by the jury for the award, “Before Snowfall packs a visual punch to match the force and ambition of its story” and “invites us into many vivid worlds and fulfills many possibilities for cinematography as an art form.”

=== Letter to the King (2014) ===
Zaman’s second feature film, Letter to the King, features five characters on a day trip from their refugee shelter to the Norwegian capital city of Oslo, each with a unique agenda for the trip. Tying the five stories together is the voice of an 83-year-old man, desperate to return to Kurdistan, who decides to write a letter explaining his plight to the King of Norway.

The script for Letter to the King was co-written with Mehmet Aktas, a Kurdish producer and writer from Turkey. They wrote the script in three weeks, inspired by stories of refugees they knew personally. The film was shot in 35 days without any financial backing. A review has called it a “beautifully structured, highly emotional and deeply memorable ensemble piece” and one that “finds narrative diversity in the tragi-comic variety of immigrant experience.”

Letter to the King once again won the Dragon Award for Best Nordic Film at the Gothenburg Film Festival in 2014. The award was given by the jury for “a film that is compassionate and honest in its presentation of human existence.”

The film also received the FIPRESCI award at the European Cinema Festival of Lecce, and was one of three films shortlisted for a nomination to the Oscar Awards by the Norwegian Oscar Committee.

=== A Happy Day (2023) ===
Hisham Zaman presented his third feature film, A Happy Day, at the 2023 Toronto International Film Festival. The movie centers on three teenagers who live in a refugee centre in a remote region of Norway and face deportation as they are reaching their eighteenth birthday.

== Themes and directing style ==
While refugees are the central characters in all his films, Zaman stresses that ‘I make films about human beings, not about politics.’ Through his emphasis on human stories, he seeks to portray refugees and migrants as complex and diverse individuals, rather than a monolithic entity. In his words, “[t]his is what makes us human, because we are so different. But at the same time, we are judged by the politicians, media, society as one group.”

Zaman’s films are all fictional, but they are inspired by real-life events, stories, and personalities. Some of his own experiences as a child refugee influenced the sequence of events in Bawke. He has said that “it was important for me to empty myself of the stories that have bothered me for many years.” When making Before Snowfall, Zaman met with human smugglers and used the details they provided to guide his story development. He regularly returns to Kurdistan and visits refugee camps in Oslo to collect stories. As a result, his films play with the boundaries between documentary and fiction.

Zaman is also notable for his use of non-professional actors to play the majority of the leading roles in his films. His team has recruited refugees from public places such as cafes and community centres to act in his films. As he says, “[f]or me, casting is an important part of the filmmaking process, maybe 50% of the whole film. If you have the right cast, half of the job is done.” He also borrows from amateur actors’ expressions and clothing to lend authenticity to his work. While his scripts are written in Norwegian, the dialogues in his films are often in Kurdish or other languages spoken by refugees.

Despite the harshness of the refugee experiences that influence him, comedy is a feature of all of Zaman’s work. In his words, “lightness and humour are also present in my films: they are often born from the absurdity of the situations.”

Zaman’s work marks a departure from mainstream diaspora Kurdish cinema, which has tended to rely heavily on tropes of suffering and political betrayal. His films have also been recognized for the contribution they have made to Norwegian national cinema by exploring the experiences and challenges of migrant communities in the context of an evolving society.

== Other ==
Zaman founded the production company Snowfall Cinema in 2015. He was an associate professor at the Norwegian Film School, where he has also served as Head of the Department of Film Direction. He speaks six languages: Kurdish, Arabic, Turkish, Persian, Norwegian and English.

== Filmography ==
1. Piraten (2002) — Short
2. The Bridge (2003) — Short
3. The Roof (2004) — Short
4. Bawke (2005) — Short
5. Vinterland (2007)
6. Europa (2009) — Short
7. The Other Ones (2009) — Short
8. Before Snowfall (2013)
9. Letter to the King (2014)
10. Hedda (2016) — Short
11. The Boy in the Picture (2016) — Short
12. A Happy Day (2023)

== Awards ==
| Year | Awarding body | Category | Film |
|---|---|---|---|
| 2015 | Duhok Film Festival | Best Film Made in Diaspora | Letter to the King |
| 2015 | Duhok Film Festival | Best Screenplay | Letter to the King |
| 2014 | The Northern Film Festival | Award for Special Contribution to Northern Cinema | Letter to the King |
| 2014 | Nordic Film Days Lübeck | Honorable Mention | Letter to the King |
| 2014 | San Marino International Film Festival | Best Film | Letter to the King |
| 2014 | National Film Award | Amanda for Best Screenplay | Letter to the King |
| 2014 | National Film Award | Amanda for Best Actress in a Supporting Role, to Ivan Anderson | Letter to the King |
| 2014 | ArtFilmFest International Film Festival | Special Mention, The City of Trenčianske Teplice Mayor’s Award | Letter to the King |
| 2014 | European Cinema Festival of Lecce | FIPRESCI Award | Letter to the King |
| 2014 | Gothenburg International Film Festival | Dragon Award for Best Nordic Film | Letter to the King |
| 2014 | Carthage Film Festival | The Bronze Tanit for Feature Films, FIPRESCI Award, Best Actress to Suzan Ilir | Before Snowfall |
| 2014 | The Northern Film Festival | Award for Special Contribution to Northern Cinema, Audience Award for Best Feature Film | Before Snowfall |
| 2014 | Baltic Debuts, Kaliningrad | Best Director | Before Snowfall |
| 2014 | Festroia International Film Festival | Best First Film | Before Snowfall |
| 2013 | International Filmfestival Mannheim-Heidelberg | Special Award of the Jury | Before Snowfall |
| 2013 | Abu Dhabi Film Festival | Best Film from the Arab World | Before Snowfall |
| 2013 | Duhok International Film Festival | Best Kurdish Actress to Suzan Ilir, Special Mention of the Jury, Duhok City Award | Before Snowfall |
| 2013 | Prishtina International Film Festival | Golden Goddess - Best Film Main Competition | Before Snowfall |
| 2013 | Batumi Film Festival | Grand Prix | Before Snowfall |
| 2013 | Tribeca Film Festival | Best Cinematography in a Narrative Feature Film | Before Snowfall |
| 2013 | Gothenburg International Film Festival | Dragon Award Best Nordic Film | Before Snowfall |
| 2007 | Autrans International Mountain & Adventure Film Festival | Grand Prix Jos. Giovanni | Winterland |
| 2007 | National Film Award | Amanda for Best Actor in a Leading Role, to Raouf Saraj | Winterland |
| 2008 | Manchester Kurdish Film Festival | Best Director, Best Film | Bawke |
| 2007 | The Golden Elephant - International Children's Film Festival India | The Silver Elephant for the best Short Fiction Live Action Film | Bawke |
| 2007 | Abu Dhabi Film Festival | Black Pearl Award for Best Short Film | Bawke |
| 2007 | Short Shorts Film Festival & Asia | Jupiter Television Award, Best Short Film | Bawke |
| 2007 | Sedona International Film Festival | Best Foreign Language Short Film | Bawke |
| 2006 | The Norwegian Ministry of Culture | Human Rights Award | Bawke |
| 2006 | Siena International Short Film Festival | Audience Award | Bawke |
| 2006 | MedFilm Festival, Rome | Premio Methexis | Bawke |
| 2006 | Festival du Film Court de Villeurbanne | Best European Short Film | Bawke |
| 2006 | Festival du Cinéma International de Abitibi-Témiscamingue | Télebéc Prize | Bawke |
| 2006 | Cineposible International Film Festival of Extremadura | Best Short Film | Bawke |
| 2006 | Palm Springs International ShortsFest | Best of Festival Award | Bawke |
| 2006 | Capalbio Cinema International Short Film Festival | Best Director | Bawke |
| 2006 | Valencia International Film Festival Cinema Jove | Silver Luna de Valencia | Bawke |
| 2006 | SFF Worldwide Short Film Festival, Toronto | Best Live Action Short Film | Bawke |
| 2006 | Huesca International Film Festival | Special Mention | Bawke |
| 2006 | Shadowline Salerno Film Festival | The Young Jury Award for Best European Short | Bawke |
| 2006 | Aspen Shortsfest | BAFTA/LA Award for Excellence, Special Jury Recognition for Outstanding Performance by a Child, to Broa Ako Rasol | Bawke |
| 2006 | Human Rights Film Festival Donostia - San Sebastian | Youth Jury Award for Best Short Film | Bawke |
| 2006 | Clermont-Ferrand International Short Film Festival | Prix de la Jeunesse | Bawke |
| 2005 | Brest European Short Film Festival | Mention Special du Jury Jeune, Mention of the Jury | Bawke |
| 2005 | Nordisk Panorama - 5 Cities Festival, Bergen | Canal+ Award, Special Mention, Short Films | Bawke |
| 2005 | The Norwegian Short Film Festival | The Writers Guild of Norway's Award for Best Screenplay: Timeglasset - The Hourglass | Bawke |
| 2005 | The Norwegian Short Film Festival | The Norwegian Film Workers Association's Technical Award, to Cinematographer Marius M. Gulbrandsen, | Bawke |
| 2005 | The Norwegian Short Film Festival | Prix UIP Grimstad- Nominated for Best European Short Film | Bawke |
| 2005 | The Norwegian Short Film Festival | Gullstolen - The Golden Chair Award for Best Short Film | Bawke |
| 2005 | The Norwegian Short Film Festival | Audience Award | Bawke |
| 2003 | The Norwegian Short Film Festival | The Writers Guild of Norway's Award for Best Screenplay: Time-glasset - The Hourglass | Broen |
