= Elisa Viihde =

Finnish entertainment service company

Elisa Viihde is a Finnish entertainment service produced by Elisa. Elisa Viihde offers video-on-demand services, pay-TV packages, recording space, and applications for smartphones, tablets and laptops as well as broadband. Elisa Viihde offers original series, movies, tv programmes and sport.

In November 2018 Elisa Viihde had over 400,000 customers and over 300,000 in Finland.

== History ==
Elisa Viihde was founded in 2009 as an online recording service.

In spring 2010 Elisa and Finnish Broadcasting Company Yleisradio launched their collaboration that provided hundreds of Yle Areena programmes via Elisa Viihde. At the beginning Elisa Viihde financed Finnish movies. In 2014, Elisa Viihde started producing also original series, the first one being the sketch comedy Molton Klubi. Elisa Viihde is constantly publishing new original series, in the spring 2018 it had published about ten original series and by the end of the year there were five more released. At the end of March 2020, there were 19 series.

== Elisa Viihde Aitio/Viaplay ==
Elisa Viihde Aitio was a streaming service offering original series in addition to other series and movies. Aitio also featured music related content, e.g. documentaries, concert recordings, musicals and Spotify.

Aitio was also viewed via television, computer, tablet and smartphone. Elisa paid copyright royalties based on its revenue. On 24 June 2020, Elise Viihde Aitio merged with the Finnish version of Nordic Entertainment Group's Viaplay service to form Elisa Viihde Viaplay.

== Elisa Viihde original series ==
Elisa Viihde original series, e.g. Bullets, Arctic Circle and All the Sins, have gained international recognition.

Original series published by March 2020 (in alphabetical order):

- Bullets (Bullets)
- Downshiftaajat (Downshifters)
- Huone 301 (Man in Room 301)
- Ismo, fictive reality comedy of the life of Ismo Leikola. Series received Venla-nomination in Finland
- Ivalo (Arctic Circle)
- Jättekiva (Idiomatic)
- Jääsoturit
- Kaikki synnit (All the Sins). The screenplay was awarded with the Nordisk Film & TV Fond's screenwriting award.
- Kalifornian kommando (Perfect Commando) (2020)
- Kevyttä yläpilveä (World's Safest Place) (2020)
- Kolmistaan (Threesome)
- Konttori, Finnish version of The Office in co-operation with Nelonen, Elisa Viihde and BBC Worldwide. (2017)
- Maanantai (Monday)
- Molton Klubi
- Munkkivuori (Summer of Sorrow)
- Nyrkki (Shadow Lines)
- Pohjolan laki (2020)
- Pää edellä
- Sipoon herttua (The Duke of suburbs)
- Supisuomalaiset
- Virittäjät

== Elisa Viihde Sport ==
Elisa Viihde Sport (previously Fanseat) offers various sports that do not usually get attention from major channels. It features Finnish leagues like Korisliiga and Ykkönen, European basketball such as the German Bundesliga and Spanish Liga ACB, and Swedish Allsvenskan football. From December 2018, Elisa has offered 4K resolution broadcasts.
