= Kjell Ola Dahl =

Norwegian writer (born 1958)

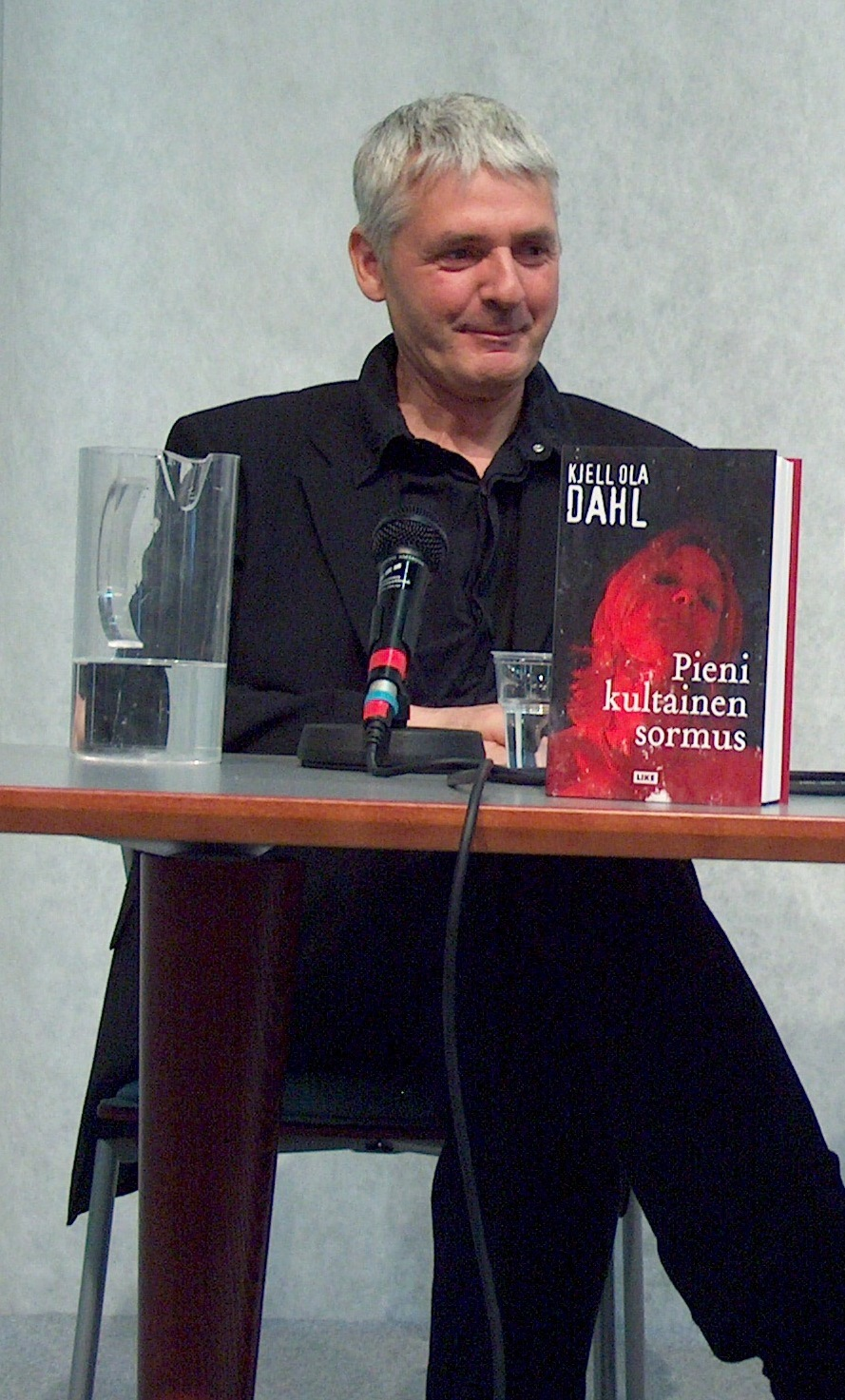
- Dahl in 2005
- Born: 4 February 1958 (age 68)
- Occupations: Novelist; Short story writer Non-fiction writer
- Writing career
- Language: Norwegian
- Period: 1993–
- Genre: Crime fiction
- Notable works: En liten gyllen ring Kureren
- Notable awards: Riverton Prize; Brage Prize

Kjell Ola Dahl (born 4 February 1958) is a Norwegian writer, who is sometimes known professionally as K. O. Dahl.

His writing career began with the publishing of Dødens Investeringer (Lethal Investments) in 1993 and he has subsequently authored more than a dozen novels, many short stories, several non-fiction books, and co-written two screenplays with the writer/director Hisham Zaman.

He is best known for his eleven Nordic noir crime novels which feature his Oslo detectives Frølich and Gunnarstranda. Six of these have been published in English, translated by Don Bartlett.

Speaking of his own work in Nordic Noir Dahl says ‘I’m never entirely satisfied with my work – I’m pleased, of course, that readers find things to enjoy in them, but I can always see their weaknesses all too clearly'.

== Bibliography ==
=== In English ===
Translated by Don Bartlett.

- The Fourth Man (2007)
- The Man in the Window (2008)
- The Last Fix (2009)
- Lethal Investments (2011)
- The Courier (2015)
- Faithless (2017)
- The Ice Swimmer (2018)

=== In Norwegian ===
- Dødens investeringer (1993) – Lethal Investments
- Seksognitti (1994)
- Miniatyren (1996)
- Siste skygge av tvil (1998)
- En liten gyllen ring (2000) – The Last Fix
- Mannen i vinduet (2001) – The Man in the Window
- Gjensynsgleder - love stories (2002)
- Lille tambur (2003)
- Venezia – forfatterens guide (2004) – a travel guide
- Den fjerde raneren (2005) – The Fourth Man
- Lindeman & Sachs (2006)
- Svart engel (2007)
- Lindemans tivoli (2008)
- Kvinnen i plast (2010) – Faithless
- Isbaderen (2011) – The Ice Swimmer
- Kureren (2015)

== Screenplays ==
- Vinterland (2007)
- Før Snøen Faller (2013)

Awards
Preceded by Ingvild H. Rishøi	Recipient of the Brage Prize, open class 2015	Succeeded by Gudny Ingebjørg Hagen; Malgorzata Piotrowska
