= Absentee (band) =

English alternative rock band

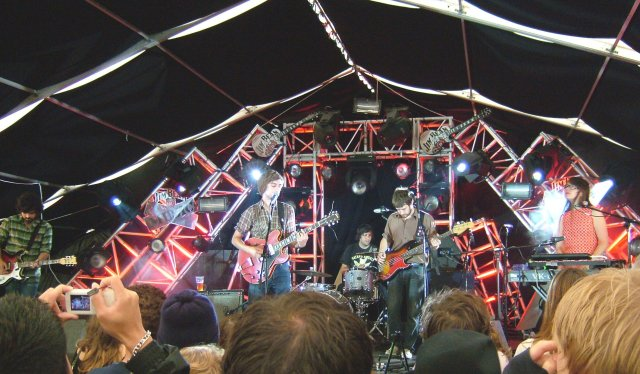
- Absentee playing live at the Summer Sundae festival 2006

Background information
- Origin: London, England
- Genres: Alternative rock
- Years active: 2003–2008
- Labels: Memphis Industries
- Past members: Dan Michaelson; Melinda Bronstein; Babak Ganjei; Laurie Earle; Jon Chandler; Che Albrighton

Absentee were an English alternative rock band from London, England, signed to Memphis Industries. The band members were Dan Michaelson (vocals/guitar), Melinda Bronstein (vocals, keyboards, melodica, glockenspiel), Babak Ganjei (guitar/lap steel), Laurie Earle (bass) and Jon Chandler (drums, later replaced by Che Albrighton).

== Career ==
Before forming the band, Michaelson and Bronstein collaborated to make the self-produced mini-album Hawaiian Disco. Five songs from that mini-album, and other unreleased material was used in the 2003 film Twisted, shown in the Raindance Film Festival.

Later in 2010, the band contributed a song to Missed Connections, a short film which premiered at the Cannes Film Festival.

The band have had two previous major releases. Donkey Stock in 2005 was a six track EP, which received a 6.8 rating from Pitchfork but a less enthusiastic review from PopMatters. The NME called it a "lugubrious wonder", with James Jam considering "Michaelson’s grumbled, world-weary mumble...the most wondrous sound to trickle out of a human being’s voicebox all year".

In 2006, the band released the James Ford-produced album, Schmotime, which was well received by the music press, including a 7.1 Pitchfork rating.

In 2008, they released their final album, Victory Shorts. The album received a four-star review from AllMusic, with Tim Sendra describing it as "an assured, confident, and quite often brilliant album...a triumph of wit, emotion, and scarred beauty that is sure to rank with the best albums of 2008", also receiving positive reviews from Q, Uncut, and The Guardian. NPR said of the album that it "has individual moments of greatness, but sometimes feels bipolar overall".

They toured with The Magic Numbers, Brakes, Broken Family Band, Bloc Party and Silver Jews.

When not recording and touring with Absentee, all the band members had side projects, Michaelson with Dan Michaelson and The Coastguards, Ganjei, Bronstein and Earle with Wet Paint, and Bronstein with The Bronsteins. In 2011, Michaelson released his debut solo album, Sudden Fiction.

== Discography ==
=== Singles ===
- 2006 "Something to Bang" #180 UK
- 2006 "Weasel"
- 2006 "We Should Never Have Children"
- 2006 "There's A Body In A Car Somewhere"
- 2008 "Boy, Did She Teach You Nothing?"

=== EPs ===
- 2005 Donkey Stock
- 2008 Bitchstealer EP

=== Albums ===
- 2004 Hawaiian Disco
- 2006 Schmotime
- 2008 Victory Shorts
