= Sudden Fiction (album) =

Studio album by Dan Michaelson Dan Michaelson and The Coastguards
- Released: 7 November 2011
- Genre: Alternative, singer songwriter
- Length: 31:03
- Label: Editions

Dan Michaelson Dan Michaelson and The Coastguards chronology
Shakes (2010)	Sudden Fiction (2011)	Blindspot (2013)

Professional ratings
Review scores
Source	Rating
"The Guardian"	3/5 stars
"Drowned in Sound"	7/10 stars

Sudden Fiction is the third album by Dan Michaelson a.k.a. Dan Michaelson and The Coastguards and was released by indie label Editions in 2011.

== Track listing ==
No.	Title	Writer(s)	Length
1.	"Breaking Falls"	Dan Michaelson	4:45
2.	"Knots"	Dan Michaelson	3:32
3.	"Tonight"	Dan Michaelson	4:11
4.	"I Lay With You"	Dan Michaelson	3:52
5.	"New Ruins"	Dan Michaelson	3:20
6.	"We Clear"	Dan Michaelson	4:17
7.	"Knee Deep"	Dan Michaelson	3:43
8.	"Scraps"	Dan Michaelson	3:23
Total length:			31:03
