= Ismo Leikola =

Finnish comedian (born 1979)

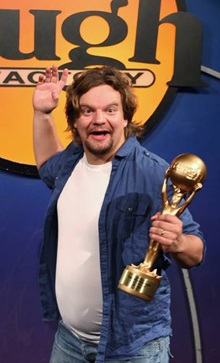
- Leikola at the Laugh Factory 2014
- Born: Ismo Mikael Leikola; 22 January 1979 (age 47); Jyväskylä, Finland
- Other name: ISMO
- Occupation: Comedian
- Years active: 2002–present
- Website: www.ismo.fun

Ismo Mikael Leikola (born 22 January 1979), sometimes known professionally as ISMO, is a Finnish comedian, musician, author, screenwriter, and YouTuber. Leikola made his United States debut in 2014, when he won the "Funniest Person in the World" competition organized by the comedy club Laugh Factory. In 2015, he made comedy series ISMO for Finnish television and moved to the United States. He gained more recognition after his appearance on the Conan talk show in 2018 and has since toured internationally. He has a YouTube channel with over 500,000 subscribers.

== Early life and education ==
Leikola was born in Jyväskylä, Finland on 22 January 1979 and lived his childhood in Kuohu, a village 15 kilometres (9.3 mi) from Jyväskylä. Prior to a career in stand-up comedy, Leikola studied at the University of Jyväskylä with physics as his main subject and philosophy as secondary.

== Comedic career ==
=== 2002–2013 ===
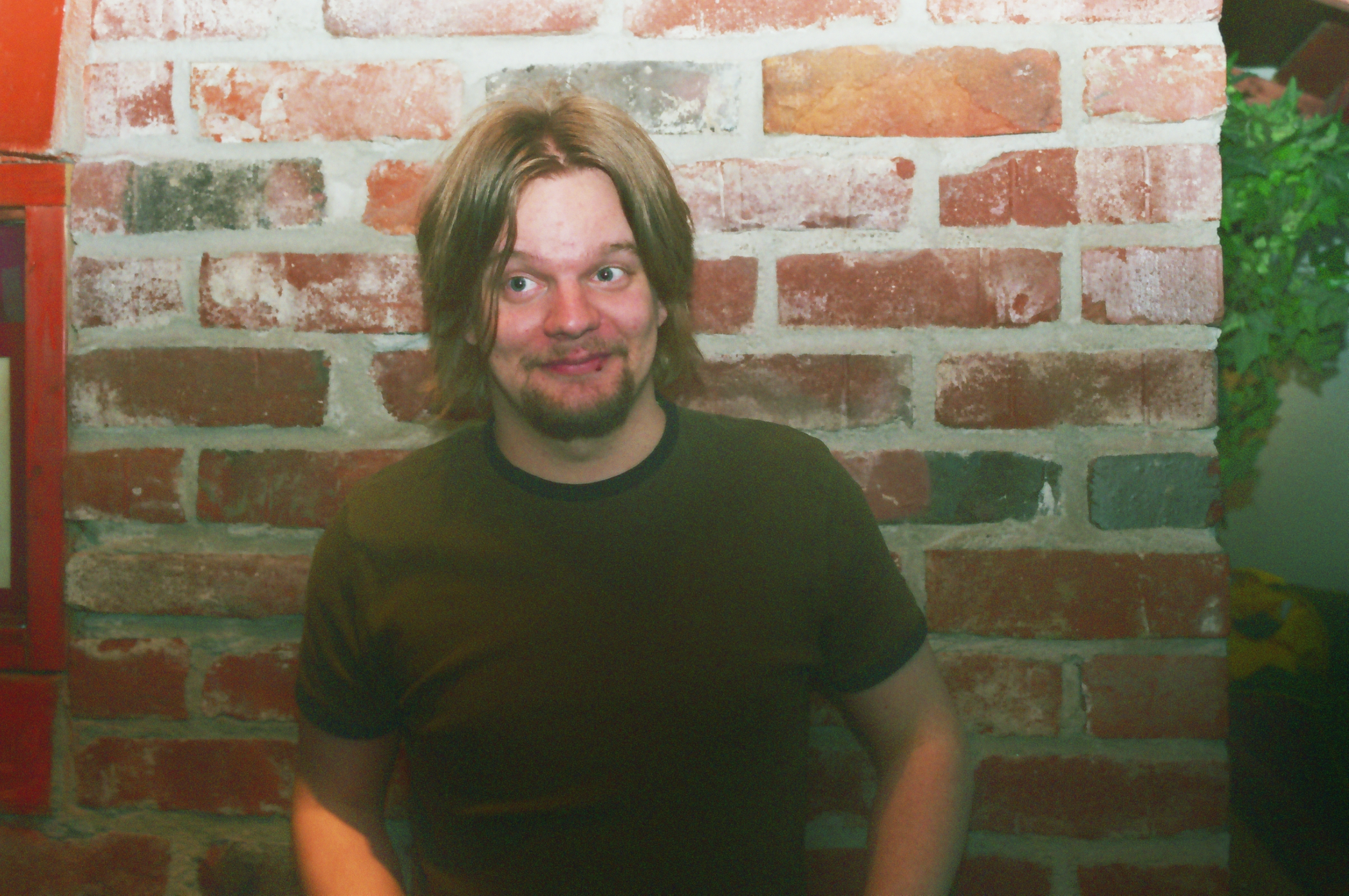
Leikola in 2007

While studying physics and chemistry at the University of Jyväskylä, Leikola was first introduced to stand-up comedy at the campus bar Ilokivi where he debuted in 2002. The experience inspired him to study stand-up comedy from old VHS cassette tapes containing performances from Eddie Murphy and Eddie Izzard. A year and a half later, he was already performing around Finland. In 2003, he received his own segment on the Hyppönen-Enbuske Experience talk show as a "correspondent for the City of Jyväskylä" in which he performed for several years. He started performing in English in 2005 while visiting the UK. In 2007 and 2008, Leikola performed at the prestigious Edinburgh Festival Fringe in Edinburgh, Scotland.

=== 2014: The Funniest Person in the World ===
By May 2014, Leikola had performed in Scandinavia and Europe, including performances in the UK, Ireland, Switzerland, Germany, and Estonia. In the fall of 2014, he gave a performance at the International Comedy Showcase in London. Steve Bennett, the editor-in-chief of the comedy website Chortle, referred to Leikola's performance as No. 1 of the evening. In October 2014, Leikola won the first "Funniest Person In The World" competition organized by the Laugh Factory. The winner was selected based on an online voting system and celebrity guests. Leikola received almost 160,000 online votes. The runner-up, Saad Haroon from Pakistan, received over 59,000 votes. The winner of the competition was awarded US$10,000 and a tour across the United States.

=== 2015–present ===
In 2015, Leikola traveled across the United States with his "Funniest Person In The World" tour and also in Finland with his comic band Muusikot. He then started a nine-part comedy show ISMO for the Finnish Elisa Viihde. The comedy show was among five nominated for best Television Comedy Series at the annual Golden Venla (Kultainen Venla) gala hosted by the Finnish Television Academy. Leikola was also invited to the Finnish Independence Day Reception at the Presidential Palace in Helsinki, Finland.

At the end of 2015, Leikola moved to Los Angeles. In October 2016, he performed on the Last Call with Carson Daly show on NBC. In January 2018, Leikola appeared on Conan O'Brien's talk show Conan. He was the first Finnish comedian to appear on an American talk show. A video clip of the interpretations of the English word ass became the most-watched stand-up comedy clip in the history of the Conan O'Brien's show. By August 2019, it had 70 million Facebook views. In 2019, Leikola started to collaborate with Merriam-Webster's dictionary, creating a series of videos for them about the quirks of the English language. In October 2019, he made his appearance on The Late Late Show with James Corden.

In 2019, Leikola had been performing three years in the United States and also on nine tours in Finland and performing an estimated 250–300 shows a year. In the United States, he was performing four or five times a night during the weekends. Leikola has become a regular performer in comedy clubs in Los Angeles such as the Laugh Factory and Comedy & Magic Club. Leikola has performed at internationally known festivals, such as the Edinburgh Fringe, Just for Laughs 2017, and Melbourne International Comedy festival. Leikola has also toured New Zealand twice and performed at New Zealand International Comedy Festival.

In 2022, Leikola performed for 45,000 people in Dodger Stadium in Los Angeles as an opening act for Gabriel Iglesias.

== Comedic style ==
Leikola uses his outsider's point of view to find humor in ordinary things. His humor often has philosophical and science-based subtext or analyzes the Finnish and English languages. Leikola has mentioned that he is interested in the great questions of life as well as logic, the absence of logic, and the dismantling of concepts. Early on, Leikola noticed his fondness for puns and parodies when reading Mad magazines. Leikola has also stated that he has always admired American comedian George Carlin, who drew inspiration for his comedy from the analysis of language.

== Career in writing and music ==
Leikola has written and co-written sketches and jokes for TV, and a play for theatre. In 2013, Leikola wrote Saikkua kiitos (Sick leave, Please) revue along with the actor Kalle Pylvänäinen. The revue toured in different theaters in Finland and received a sequel in 2017 called Lisää saikkua, kiitos! (More sick leave, Please!) tour. Leikola composed and wrote lyrics for the music in the revue. He wrote the lyrics for the third part of the revue.

Together with his ex-wife Angelika Leikola, Leikola has written a book Suo, Kuokka ja Hollywood about their life in the United States. The book was published in March 2021 in Finnish. In February 2021, Leikola announced that the couple is writing a new English-language version of the book.

Leikola performs comedic songs with his band Muusikot. In 2015, the band members included professional musicians Richard Murto, Jussi Turunen, and Marko Jansson.

== Personal life ==
At the end of 2015, Leikola moved to Los Angeles together with his wife Angelika, who also doubles as his co-writer. They divorced in 2021 but they still work together and are good friends.

== Works ==
=== DVDs ===
Leikola filmed three DVD specials from 2008 to 2016.

- Hyvä keikka ja helvetisti extroja ("Good Gig and a Hell of a Lot of Extras", 2008), sold platinum.
- Ismo Leikola: Kasvaa ihmisenä ("Ismo Leikola: Growing as a Person", 2013), sold gold right after its release.

=== Singles (comedy songs) ===
- "Pendolino" (2013)
- "Mitä jos me silti voitetaan" (2013), featuring Pirjo Heikkilä
- "Moottoritie on kesken" (2015)

=== TV appearances in the United States ===
Leikola has appeared on:

- Last Call with Carson Daly (NBC, 2016)
- Conan (2018), Conan O'Brien's talk show
- The Late Late Show with James Corden (2019), James Corden's talk show
- Bring the Funny (2019), comedy competition series

=== TV shows in Finland ===
Some of the television shows Leikola has been in:

- Hyppönen-Enbuske Experience (later Tuomas & Juuso Experience, 2003–2006, Nelonen), performer and writer in the talk show's stand up-section as The Correspondent for the City of Jyväskylä
- Act!One (2004, TV2), stand up, sketch writing and performing
- Komiikkatehdas ("Comic Factory", 2006, TV2), stand up-comic
- Suomi myytävänä ("Finland for Sale", 2009, TV1), co-host, writer, actor
- Kansallisaarre ("National Treasure", 2010–2011, TV2), host
- Elixir (2011, Nelonen), losing weight and hosting
- Totuus rakkaudesta ("The Truth About Love", 2013, TV1)
- Naurun tasapaino ("Show Me the Funny Finland", 2013–2014, TV2), stand up-competition for beginners; guest star judge in 2013 and 2014 and special performance in the final 2013
- Rakkauden FAQ ("Love FAQ", 2014, Liv TV), panelist
- Ismo (2015, Elisa Viihde), comedy series about Leikola's fictional life

=== Movies in Finland ===
- Bolt (2008), voice actor
- Veljeni vartija (My Brother's Keeper, 2018), as himself

== Recognitions ==
- The Best Stand-Up Comedy Newcomer in Finland in 2003
- Six-time winner of the Audience Favourite Comedian Award ("Vegetable of the Year") at "Tomaatteja!Tomaatteja!" (Tomatoes!Tomatoes!) stand-up festival held in Hämeenlinna, Finland.
- In October 2014, Leikola won the "Funniest Person in The World" contest hosted by Laugh Factory.
- In 2015, Leikola was invited to the Finnish Independence Day Reception at the Presidential Palace in Helsinki, Finland.
