= Mika Ronkainen =

Finnish director and screenwriter (born 1970)

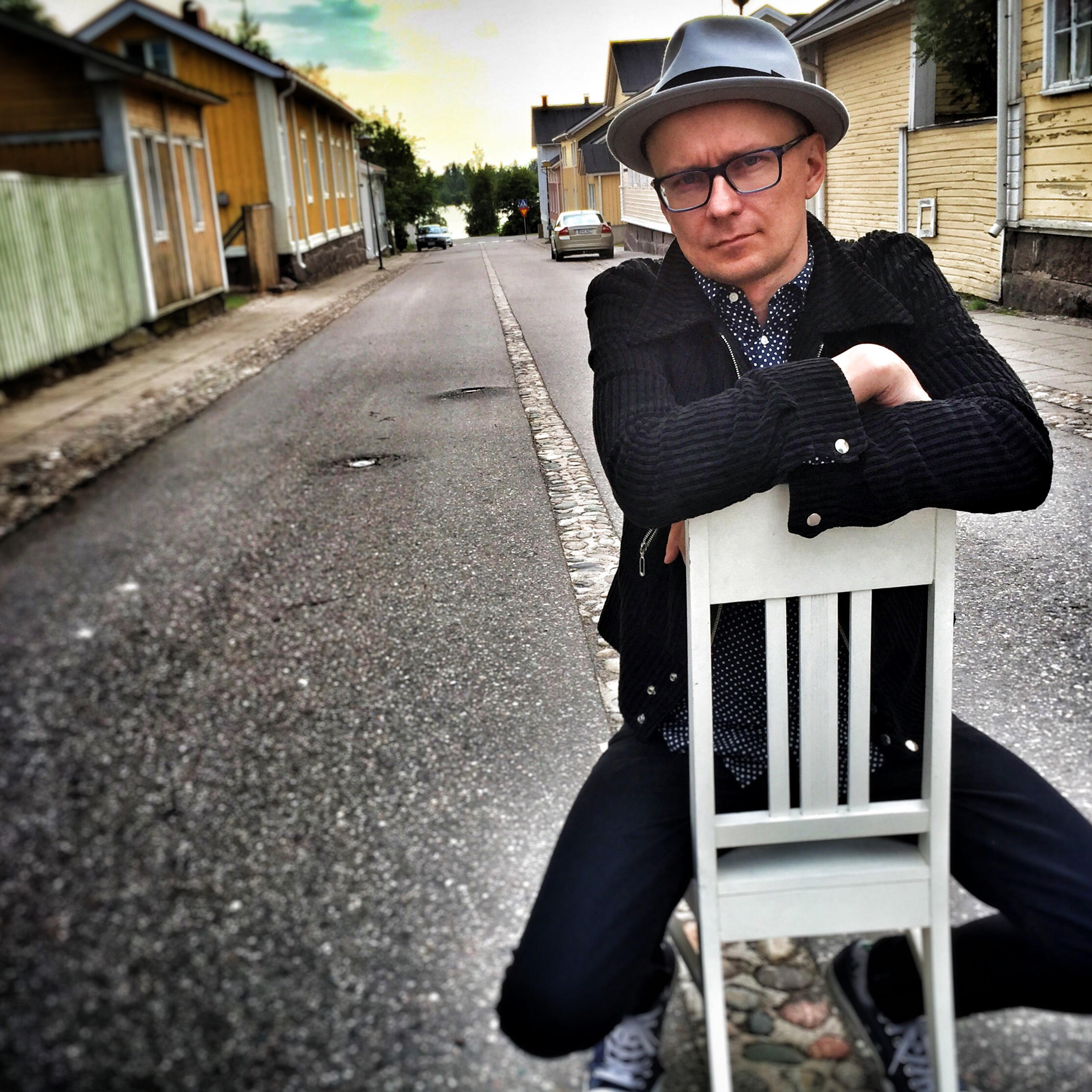
- Born: 6 August 1970 (age 55); Kuusamo, Finland
- Occupations: Film director, screenwriter, producer
- Years active: 1997–present
- Website: http://www.mikaronkainen.com

Mika Ronkainen (born 6 August 1970) is a Finnish film director and screenwriter. Ronkainen is the co-creator and director of successful television crime-drama All the Sins and he has also worked with documentary films and theatre. In June 2013, American magazine Variety selected Ronkainen as one of ten up-and-coming European directors to watch.

== Career ==
=== Documentaries ===
Ronkainen's international breakthrough film was Screaming Men (2003), a documentary film about a Finnish screaming male choir called Mieskuoro Huutajat, followed by Freetime Machos (2009), a documentary film about a rugby team which is allegedly the most northern and the third worst in the world. Screaming Men had its US premiere at Sundance Film Festival in 2004. Freetime Machos premiered at Tribeca Film Festival in 2010.

Ronkainen's latest documentary film is a musical road movie called Finnish Blood Swedish Heart, also known as Ingen riktig finne in Swedish, and Laulu koti-ikävästä in Finnish. The film has won several awards including two Jussi Awards (Finnish Oscars) in 2014: Best Documentary and Best Music, and the Dragon Award for Best Nordic Documentary at Göteborg Film Festival in 2013. Ronkainen adapted the documentary as a theatre play, which had its premiere at Oulu City Theatre in 2016.

=== Fiction ===
Ronkainen wrote and directed television series All the Sins, a crime-drama set in northern Finland. Its three seasons were released between 2019–2023. In January 2019, All the Sins was awarded with Nordisk Film & TV Fond Prize at Gothenburg Film Festival in Sweden for "outstanding writing of a Nordic drama series".

In 2026, Ronkainen directed and co-wrote the mystery drama series Citizens of Heaven, scheduled for release in late 2026.

=== Other ===
Ronkainen is one of the founders of Air Guitar World Championships which is organized annually in his hometown Oulu, Finland.

== Filmography ==
=== TV series ===
- Citizens of Heaven (2026)
- All the Sins: Seasons 1-3 (2019–2023)

=== Documentaries ===
- Finnish Blood Swedish Heart (2013)
- Freetime Machos (2009)
- Our Summer (2004)
- Screaming Men (2003)
- Car Bonus (2001)
- Before the Flood (2000)
- The World Will Change Soon (2000)
- Oulu Burning – A Town That Disappeared (1998)
- Father's Day (1998)

=== Concert Film ===
- Sentenced – Buried Alive (concert film) (2006)
