= Freetime Machos =

- Official poster
- Directed by: Mika Ronkainen
- Produced by: Mika Ronkainen; Kimmo Paananen
- Cinematography: Vesa Taipaleenmäki
- Edited by: Anders Villadsen
- Production company: Klaffi Productions
- Distributed by: DR Sales
- Release dates: 22 November 2009 (IDFA); 12 March 2010 (Finland)
- Running time: 86 minutes
- Countries: Finland; Germany
- Languages: Finnish; English; Spanish

Freetime Machos is a Finnish documentary film about the bromance of two players in world's most northerly rugby club called OYUS Rugby based in Oulu, Finland. The film is directed by Mika Ronkainen and it had its world premiere at the Joris Ivens Competition of IDFA in November 2009. The film got its North American premiere at Tribeca Film Festival in April 2010. It was also part of the Edinburgh International Film Festival in June 2010.

== Reviews ==
- Elina Mishuris. "The rugby road to modern manhood". Nyunews.com. Archived from the original on 2010-04-30.
- Logan Hill (15 April 2010). "Nine Films From the Ninth Annual Tribeca Film Festival". Nymag.com.
- Cynthia Fuchs. "Tribeca/ESPN Sports Film Festival". Popmatters.com.
