= Distance (Dan Michaelson and The Coastguards album) =

Studio album by Dan Michaelson and The Coastguards
- Released: August 18, 2014
- Genres: Alternative, singer songwriter
- Length: 30:30
- Label: The state51 Conspiracy

Dan Michaelson and The Coastguards chronology
Blindspot (2013)	Distance (2014)

Professional ratings
Review scores
Source	Rating
Mojo	4/5 stars
The Times	4/5 stars
NME	link
The Independent	4/5 stars
Press Association	8/10 stars
Uncut	8/10 stars
The Guardian	link

Distance is the fourth album by Dan Michaelson a.k.a. Dan Michaelson and The Coastguards. Released by London label The state51 Conspiracy in August 2014.

A video, directed by Edward Mantle, was created for the second single, Bones.

== Track listing ==
No.	Title	Writer(s)	Length
1.	"Evergreen"	Dan Michaelson	4:15
2.	"Bones"	Dan Michaelson	3:58
3.	"Burning Hearts"	Dan Michaelson	3:33
4.	"Every Step"	Dan Michaelson	4:26
5.	"Getting It All Wrong"	Dan Michaelson	3:10
6.	"Evening Light"	Dan Michaelson	3:09
7.	"Your Beauty Still Rules"	Dan Michaelson	3:59
8.	"Somewhere"	Dan Michaelson	3:59
Total length:			30:30
