= Ayşe Polat =

German script writer and film director (born 1970)

Ayşe Polat (born 19 October 1970) is a German-Kurdish film director, screenwriter and film producer.

== Career ==
In 1992 she releases the short film Fremdennacht, which is supported by the Hamburg Film Bureau. Her 1994 short film Ein Fest für Beyhan wins several awards, including the WDR sponsorship prize. Gräfin Sophia Hatun (1997) also tours several international festivals and receives the Special Jury Prize at the Ankara International Film Festival.

Her feature film debut Tour Abroad (1999) toured numerous international festivals and partook in the international competition of Karlovy Vary and Tokyo. Polat received the award for best directorial debut at the Ankara International Film Festival.

Her second feature film En Garde (2004) was screened as the Locarno Film Festival opening film and received the Silver Leopard for Best Film and Best Actresses, Maria Kwiatkowsky and Pinar Erincin. In 2005, Polat received the German Critics Award for En Garde.

In 2006, Polat directed her first theater work Otobüs at Berlin's Theater Hebbel am Ufer (HAU 2). The play deals with the kidnapping of a group of German package tourists in Turkey.

Polat co-produced her third feature film Luks Glück. The tragicomedy tells the story of a Turkish family between Hamburg and Istanbul, whose life is thrown off course when they win the lottery.

In 2013, her film The Heiress, which she also produced, premiered at the International Film Festival Rotterdam. The film deals with the return of a young woman from Germany back to the home country of her deceased father.

Her first documentary The Others is completed in 2016 and has its international premiere at DOK Leipzig.

== Reception ==
Polat belongs to the first wave of young Turkish filmmakers at the end of the nineties. Her Kurdish heritage allows the young filmmaker a different approach to themes of belonging and origin. As one of the few German filmmakers with a history of migration, she is represented at the retrospective of the 69th Berlin International Film Festival, which focuses on the filmmaking of female directors in the period from 1968 to 1999.

In her cinematic work, Polat deals with themes of the search and loss of identity. Her work is associated with the Berlin School.

Being a director of films that belong to the so-called German-Turkish cinema, Ayşe Polat is particularly involved with the political relevance of a poiesis of seeing films, as it becomes most apparent when a minority position is placed in relation to the context of a hegemonic entertainment culture.

== Filmography ==
- Fremdennacht (1992), short
- Ein Fest für Beyhan (1994) short
- Gräfin Sophia Hatun (1997) short
- Tour Abroad (1999)
- En Garde (2004)
- Luks Glück (2010)
- The Heiress (2013)
- Die Anderen (2016)
- Tatort: Masken (2021)
- In the Blind Spot (2023)
- Tatort: Borowski und das unschuldige Kind von Wacken (2023)

== Awards ==
Federal Youth and Video Competition Award

- 1991: Entfremdet

Award of the West German Broadcast

- 1994: Ein Fest für Beyhan

Ankara International Film Festival

- 1997: Jury Prize for Gräfin Sophia Hatun
- 2000: Best Directorial Debut for Tour Abroad
- 2005: Jury Prize for En Garde
- 2023: Best Director In the Blind Spot
- 2023: Best Screenplay In the Blind Spot
- 2023: FIPRESCI Award In the Blind Spot

International Film Festival Locarno

- 2004: Silver Leopard for En Garde

Otto Sprenger Directing Award

- 2004: En Garde

German Critics Award

- 2005: Best Feature Film for En Garde

German Cinema New Talent Award

- 2010: Category: Editing for Luk's Glück

Beyond Borders Documentary Film Festival

- 2018: Best Sociopolitical Documentary for The Others

DOK. Leipzig

- 2018 Ver.di Award for Solidarity, Humanity and Fairness for The Others

Oldenburg International Film Festival

- 2023: German Independence Award for Best Film In the Blind Spot

Istanbul Film Festival

- 2023: Golden Tulip for Best Film In the Blind Spot
- 2023: Best Screenplay In the Blind Spot

Dohuk Film Festival

- 2023: Best Screenplay In the Blind Spot
- 2023: FIPRESCI Award In the Blind Spot
