= Gothenburg Film Festival =

Annual film festival in Gothenburg, Sweden

Coordinates: 57°42′4.32″N 11°57′12.02″E

Göteborg Film Festival
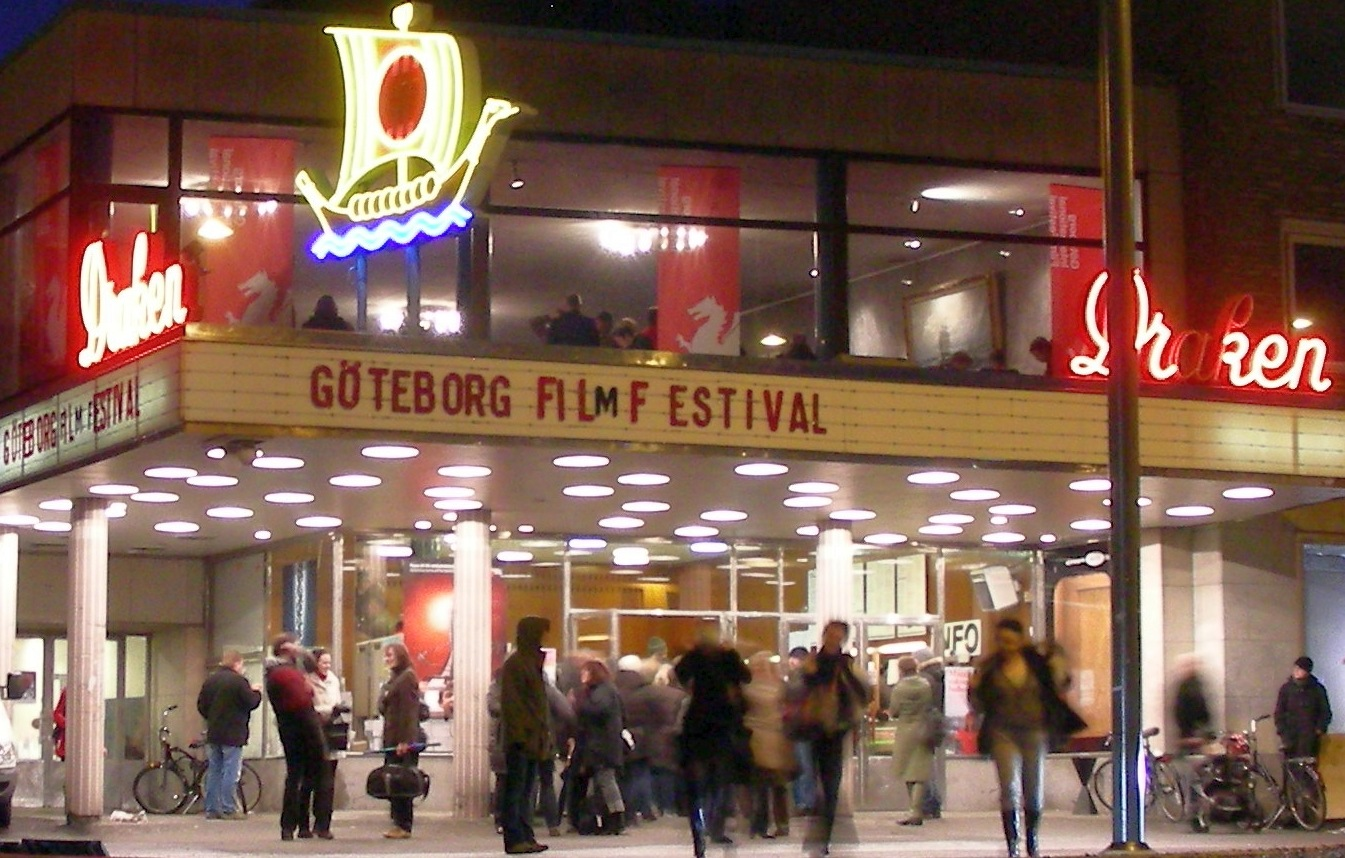
- The Draken (Dragon) cinema, the main venue of the festival.
- Location: Gothenburg, Sweden
- Awards: Dragon Award Best Nordic Film, The Ingmar Bergman International Debut Award, etc.
- No. of films: Roughly 450 films from 70 countries (in 2012), 10 theaters, and many other venues
- Website: goteborgfilmfestival.se

Göteborg Film Festival (GFF), formerly Göteborg International Film Festival (GIFF), known in English as the Gothenburg Film Festival, formerly Gothenburg International Film Festival, is an annual film festival in Gothenburg, Sweden and the largest film event in Scandinavia. When it was launched on February 8, 1979, it showed 17 films on 3 screens and had 3,000 visitors.

Today, the film festival takes place over 10 days each year at the end of January and beginning of February. In recent years an estimated 450 films from 60 countries annually have been screened for 115,000 visitors. The film festival is an important market place for contractors in the movie industry.

== Awards ==
As of 2022 the following prizes were awarded:

=== Dragon Awards ===
- Dragon Award Best Nordic Film (Nordiska filmpriset)
- Dragon Award Best Acting (since 2019)
- Audience Dragon Award Best Nordic Film – (Nordiska Filmpriset – Publikens val)
- Dragon Award Best Nordic Documentary (since 2013)
- Dragon Award Best International Film
- Honorary Dragon Award
- Nordic Honorary Dragon Award
- Dragon Award Best Swedish Short

=== Other awards ===
- FIPRESCI Award
- Sven Nykvist Cinematography Award, named for Sven Nykvist
- The Ingmar Bergman International Debut Award, named for Ingmar Bergman
- Draken Film Award (since 2022, for a Swedish short film)
- Audience Choice Award for Best Swedish Short
- Angelo Award, the Swedish Church's award
- Nordic Series Script Award (from 2026), funded by Nordisk Film & TV Fond, secretariat to the Nordic Council, successor to the Nordisk Film & TV Fond Prize a former award given by the Nordisk Film & TV Fond (until 2025)

== Dragon Award for Best Nordic Film ==
The festival's main award is the Dragon Award for Best Nordic Film, which can be won for feature film productions from the Nordic countries. The following films have received the award:

Year	English title	Original title	Director	Country	Ref
1989	David or Goliath	David eller Goliath	Anne Wivel	Norway	
1989	Directed by Andrei Tarkovsky	Regi: Andrej Tarkovskij	Michal Leszczylowski	Sweden	
1990	A Handful of Time	En håndfull tid	Martin Asphaug	Norway	
1991	Dolly and Her Lover	Räpsy ja Dolly eli Pariisi odottaa	Matti Ijäs	Finland	
1992	Freud Leaving Home	Freud flyttar hemifrån	Susanne Bier	Denmark	
1993	Russian Pizza Blues		Michael Wikke and Steen Rasmussen	Denmark	
1994	Spring of Joy	Glädjekällan	Richard Hobert	Sweden	
1995	Cross My Heart and Hope to Die	Ti kniver i hjertet	Marius Holst	Norway	
1996	The Atlantic	Atlanten	Kristian Petri, Jan Röed and Magnus Enquist	Sweden	
1997	Body Troopers	Jakten på nyresteinen	Vibeke Idsøe	Norway	
1998	Tic Tac		Daniel Alfredson	Sweden	
1999	Yearning for a Life	Lusten till ett liv	Christer Engberg	Sweden	
2000	My Mother Had Fourteen Children	Min mamma hade 14 barn	Lars-Lennart Forsberg	Sweden	
2000	Knockout		Agneta Fagerström Olsson	Sweden	
2001	Cool and Crazy	Heftig og begeistret	Knut Erik Jensen	Norway	
2002	The Bricklayer	Muraren	Stefan Jarl	Sweden	
2003	Noi the Albino	Nói albínói	Dagur Kári	Iceland	
2004	Med kameran som tröst, del 2		Carl Johan De Geer	Sweden	
2005	Frozen Land	Paha maa	Aku Louhimies	Finland	
2006	Dark Horse	Voksne mennesker	Dagur Kári	Iceland	
2007	Darling	Darling	Johan Kling	Sweden	
2008	Let the Right One In	Låt den rätte komma in	Tomas Alfredson	Sweden	
2009	The Visitor	Muukalainen	Jukka-Pekka Valkeapää	Finland	
2010	R		Tobias Lindholm and Michael Noer	Denmark	
2011	She Monkeys	Apflickorna	Lisa Aschan	Sweden	
2012	The Orheim Company	Kompani Orheim	Arild Andresen	Norway	
2013	Before Snowfall	Før snøen faller	Hisham Zaman	Norway	
2014	Letter to the King	Brev til Kongen	Hisham Zaman	Norway	
2015	In Your Arms	I dine hænder	Samanou Acheche Sahlstrøm	Denmark	
2016	Land of Mine	Under sandet	Martin Zandvliet	Denmark	
2017	Sami Blood	Sameblod	Amanda Kernell	Sweden	
2018	Amateurs	Amatörer	Gabriela Pichler	Sweden	
2019	Queen of Hearts	Dronningen	May el-Toukhy	Denmark	
2020	Beware of Children	Barn	Dag Johan Haugerud	Norway	
2021	Tigers	Tigrar	Ronnie Sandahl	Sweden	
2022	As in Heaven	Du som er i himlen	Tea Lindeburg	Denmark	
2023	Unruly	Ustyrlig	Malou Reymann	Denmark	
2024	Mother, Couch	Mother, Couch	Niclas Larsson	Sweden	
2025	When the Light Breaks	Ljósbrot	Rúnar Rúnarsson	Iceland	

== Dragon Award for Best Nordic Documentary ==
Year	English title	Original title	Director	Country	Ref
2013	Finnish Blood Swedish Heart	Laulu koti-ikävästä	Mika Ronkainen	Finland	
2014	Pine Ridge	Pine Ridge	Anna Eborn	Denmark	
2015	The Look of Silence	The Look of Silence	Joshua Oppenheimer		
2016	Don Juan		Jerzy Sladkowski	Sweden	
2017	The War Show		Obaidah Zytoon, Andreas Dalsgaard	Denmark/Finland/Syria	
2018	The Distant Barking of Dogs	Olegs krig	Simon Lereng Wilmont	Sweden	
2019	Transnistra		Anna Eborn	Denmark	
2020	Colombia in My Arms		Jenni Kivistö, Jussi Rastas	Finland, Norway, Denmark, France	
2022	A House Made of Splinters	Будинок зі скалок	Simon Lereng Vilmont	Finland, Denmark, Ukraine, Sweden	
2023	Apolonia, Apolonia		Lea Glob	Denmark, Poland, France	

== Festival program ==
The festival is made up of several film sections. Films are chosen in each category with the advice of a committee of film experts. Categories have included:

Animation featuring short and long animated films.

Documentaries

Debuts where debutees can be discovered.

Focus featuring a region or theme in focus for that year. In 2012 focus was on Arab film and the Arab Spring.

Festival Favorites is a selection of the most liked and prized films that have been shown at festivals throughout the world during the past year.

Five Continents showing films from all categories and unconditionally traveling the globe to find the best films.

Gala featuring great films, great directors, red carpets and Oscar nominees.

HBTQ – a collection of various films that all depict nontraditional love or non-heterosexual roles.

Nordic Competition focusing on new Nordic feature-films competing for the festival's Nordic Film Prize (100,000 SEK).

Nordic Light including the best of the Sweden's four Nordic neighboring countries.

Swedish World Premiers with feature-films and documentaries being shown to general audiences for the first time.

Swedish Pictures often including circa 100 Swedish short-films.
