= Blindspot (album) =

Studio album by Dan Michaelson and The Coastguards
- Released: 25 March 2013
- Genre: Alternative, singer songwriter
- Length: 32:06
- Label: The state51 Conspiracy

Dan Michaelson and The Coastguards chronology
Sudden Fiction (2011)	Blindspot (2013)	Distance (2014)

Professional ratings
Review scores
Source	Rating
Mojo	4/5 stars
Tank	Positive link
Pitchfork Media	Positive link
Music News	link

Blindspot is the fourth album by Dan Michaelson a.k.a. Dan Michaelson and The Coastguards and was released in March 2013 by the London independent label The State 51.

== Track listing ==
No.	Title	Writer(s)	Length
1.	"No Right Way to Move"	Dan Michaelson	4:21
2.	"Enough"	Dan Michaelson	3:50
3.	"Every Fold and Crease"	Dan Michaelson	4:39
4.	"Sheets"	Dan Michaelson	2:58
5.	"You Leave Me in Ruins"	Dan Michaelson	4:04
6.	"Gambling"	Dan Michaelson	3:10
7.	"Tremors"	Dan Michaelson	4:01
8.	"By My Side"	Dan Michaelson	5:03
Total length:			32:06
