= Dan Michaelson =

- Born: 13 December 1976 (age 48); Northampton, England
- Genres: Indie rock
- Years active: 2003–present
- Labels: Memphis Industries, Editions
- Website: dan.michaelsonscores.com/music

Dan Michaelson (born 13 December 1976 in Northampton) is a British musician who originally found success as singer with Absentee, before recording as Dan Michaelson and The Coastguards and as a solo artist.

== Biography ==
Michaelson began writing songs in his mid-20s. Michaelson formed Absentee in 2003, the group releasing three albums between 2003 and 2008. In 2009 he began a side project, recording as Dan Michaelson and The Coastguards, the initial release under this guise being the Saltwater album and "Bust" single, released by Memphis Industries in 2009. A further album, Shakes, followed in 2010. The band included Henry Spenner (drums - of Fields), Laurie Earle (piano/guitar), Sanjay Mitra (bass guitar), and Horse (pedal steel/guitar).

In November 2011, he released the solo album Sudden Fiction, inspired by time spent in Marfa, Texas, drawing comparisons with Bill Callahan.

Blindspot followed in 2013 and Distance in 2014, released on The state51 Conspiracy. NME describe Distance as 'forlorn Americana to rival The National', awarding the album 8/10.

Memory was described by Michaelson as the final instalment in an album trilogy that commenced with 2013's Blindspot and continued with Distance in 2014.

== Discography ==
=== Dan Michaelson ===
==== Albums ====
Artist name	Work	Label	Format
Dan Michaelson and The Coastguards	Saltwater (2009)	Memphis Industries	CD, Download
Dan Michaelson and The Coastguards	Shakes (2010)	Editions	CD, Download
Dan Michaelson	Sudden Fiction (album) (2011)	Editions	LP, CD, Download
Dan Michaelson and The Coastguards	Blindspot (2013)	The state51 Conspiracy	CD, Download
Dan Michaelson and The Coastguards	Distance (2014)	The state51 Conspiracy	LP, CD, Download
Dan Michaelson and The Coastguards	Memory (2016)	The state51 Conspiracy	LP, CD, Download
Dan Michaelson	First Light (2017)	The state51 Conspiracy	LP, CD, Download

==== Singles ====
Work	Label	Format
Bust (2009)	Memphis Industries	LP
Love Lends a Hand (2010)		CD, Download
Now I'm a Coastguard (2010)	Memphis Industries	CD
Sheets (2013)	The state51 Conspiracy	
Burning Hearts (2014)	The state51 Conspiracy	Download
Bones (2014)	The state51 Conspiracy	Download
