= Letter to the King =

- Film poster
- Norwegian: Brev til Kongen
- Directed by: Hisham Zaman
- Starring: Ali Bag Salimi; Zheer Durhan
- Release date: 14 January 2014 (TIFF)
- Running time: 75 minutes
- Country: Norway
- Languages: Kurdish, Norwegian, English, Persian

Letter to the King (Norwegian: Brev til Kongen) is a 2014 Norwegian drama film directed by Hisham Zaman.

== Cast ==
- Ali Bag Salimi - Mirza
- Zheer Durhan - Zirek
- Nazmi Kirik - Miro
- Hassan Dimirci - Champion
- Ivan Anderson - Beritan
- Derin Kader - Lorin
- Raouf Saraj - Rebin
