= Sudden Fiction (Continued) =

1996 short story collection

- First edition cover
- Editor: Robert Shapard and James Thomas
- Publisher: W. W. Norton & Co
- Publication date: 1996
- ISBN: 978-0-393-03830-9

Sudden Fiction (Continued): 60 New Short Stories is a 1996 short story collection compiled and edited by Robert Shapard and James Thomas. It is a follow-up to Sudden Fiction International (1989) and Sudden Fiction - American Short-Short Stories.

Notable authors in Sudden Fiction (Continued) include William Maxwell, Margaret Atwood, Don DeLillo, Mark Richard, Molly Giles, Bruce Holland Rogers, Barry Peters, Andrew Lam, and Judy Troy.

== Reception ==
Critical reception to the short story collection was positive. A reviewer from Publishers Weekly felt that the authors created fast-paced stories with "full, vivid characters and descriptions" while keeping the stories short. Greg Johnson wrote in The Atlanta Journal-Constitution that some of the short stories seemed gimmicky, but that Sudden Fiction (Continued) was a rich, vibrant collection otherwise. Lisa Meyers from the Los Angeles Times thought that the short story collection succeeded because it offered a "variety of voices, themes, and narrative techniques." Booklist's Michele Leber liked the book's format, stating that it is "perfectly suited to the pace of modern life" since the short stories can be read in a few minutes time.
