= In the Blind Spot =

2023 German thriller film

- Official poster
- Directed by: Ayşe Polat
- Written by: Ayşe Polat
- Produced by: Mehmet Aktaş; Janna Heine
- Starring: Katja Bürkle; Ahmet Varlı; Çağla Yurga; Aybi Era
- Cinematography: Patrick Orth
- Edited by: Serhad Mutlu, Jörg Volkmar
- Music by: Dynamedion
- Production company: Mitosfilm
- Distributed by: ArtHood Entertainment
- Release date: 19 February 2023 (Berlinale)
- Running time: 118 minutes
- Country: Germany
- Languages: German; Turkish; Kurdish; English

In the Blind Spot (German: Im toten Winkel) is a 2023 German mystery thriller film directed and written by Ayşe Polat. Starring Katja Bürkle, Ahmet Varlı, Çağla Yurga and Aybi Era, the film is about Melek, a 7–year–old Turkish girl and her father Zafer, who are drawn into a complex net of conspiracy, paranoia and generational trauma. It is selected in Encounter at the 73rd Berlin International Film Festival, where it had its world premiere on 19 February 2023.

== Synopsis ==
In a remote Kurdish village, in northeastern Turkey, a documentary is shot by German film crew. They spot an old woman performing ritual to memory of her missing son. In the village, Melek, a 7-year-old Turkish girl lives, whose nanny is the Kurdish translator of the film crew. Zafer, her father works for an ominous group. When she apparently get haunted by unknown power, he gets caught between loyalty to them and fear for his family's well-being. This eventually develops into a ruinous force. The film unravels a complex net of conspiracy, paranoia and generational trauma.

== Cast ==
- Katja Bürkle as Simone
- Ahmet Varlı as Zafer
- Çağla Yurga as Melek
- Aybi Era as Leyla
- Maximilian Hemmersdorfer as Christian
- Nihan Okutucu as Sibel
- Tudan Ürper as Hatice
- Mutallip Müjdeci as Hasan
- Rıza Akın as Burhan
- Aziz Çapkurt as Eyüp

== Production ==
The film was shot from 24 April 2021 to 24 June 2021 in Turkey and Hamburg.

== Reception ==
Jay Weissberg for The Film Verdict wrote, "A bold and chilling political thriller of shifting perspectives in which the weight of state-sanctioned terror begins to crush a security agent in eastern Turkey, where trauma and paranoia rip apart the social fabric."

Joseph Fahim for Middle East Eye wrote: "A political thriller imbued with scorching commentary, this is Polat's finest film to date and is a snapshot of a lawless place governed by xenophobia and paranoia ... The use of the camera, both as a tool of surveillance and as a recorder of repressed truths, reflects the hazards of image-making in a culture terrified - yet fascinated - by what can be and what is shown."

Vladan Petkovic for Cineuropa wrote, "A mystery-thriller with Rashomon-style storytelling, German-Kurdish filmmaker Ayşe Polat's In the Blind Spot sets up an intriguing premise ... The film combines its key cinematography with smartphone videos and hidden-camera footage, which makes it feel expansive and rich on the surface, but the overly tidy editing makes the film's structure too obvious, stripping it of movie magic. On the other hand, the city where the story takes place is an excellent setting that combines magnificent ancient ruins with dark, narrow alleyways and abandoned construction sites. As such, it is an ideal background both for the mystery and for the overarching theme of transgenerational trauma ..."

== Accolades ==
Award	Date of ceremony	Category	Recipient	Result	Ref.
Berlin International Film Festival	26 February 2023	Golden Bear Plaque	In the Blind Spot	Nominated	
Istanbul Film Festival	18 April 2023	Golden Tulip (Best Film)	In the Blind Spot	Won	
Istanbul Film Festival	18 April 2023	Best Screenplay	Ayse Polat	Won	
Istanbul Film Festival	18 April 2023	Best Editing	Serhad Mutlu, Jörg Volkmar	Won	
Istanbul Film Festival	18 April 2023	FIPRESCI Award	In the Blind Spot	Won	
Oldenburg International Film Festival	17 September 2023	German Independence Award	In the Blind Spot	Won	
Ankara Film Festival	10 November 2023	Best Director	Ayse Polat	Won	
Ankara Film Festival	10 November 2023	Best Screenplay	Ayse Polat	Won	
Ankara Film Festival	10 November 2023	Best Cinematography	Patrick Orth	Won	
Ankara Film Festival	10 November 2023	Best Editing	Serhad Mutlu, Jörg Volkmar	Won	
Ankara Film Festival	10 November 2023	Best Art Direction / Production Design	Osman Özcan, Görkem Canbolat	Won	
Ankara Film Festival	10 November 2023	Best Actor	Ahmet Varlı	Won	
Ankara Film Festival	10 November 2023	Best Supporting Actress	Nihan Okutucu	Won	
