= Cinema of Turkey =

Turkish Cinema
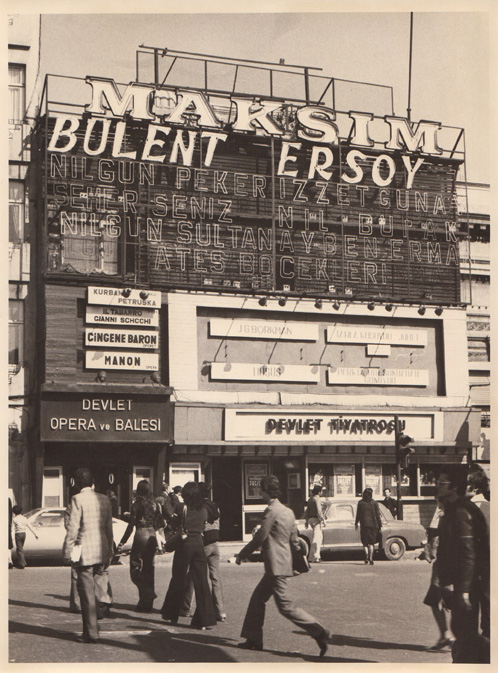
- Maxim Night Club, previously Cinemajik Movie Theater in Taksim, Istanbul.
- No. of screens: 2,826 (2019)
  - Per capita: 3.32 per 100,000 (2019)
- Main distributors: CGV Mars Distribution 50.83% UIP 22.52% TME Films 14.43% P-inema 5.37%

Produced feature films (2012)
- Total: 61

Number of admissions (2012)
- Total: 43,935,763
  - Per capita: 0.8 (2016)
- National films: 20,487,220 (47.0%)

Gross box office (2012)
- Total: $234 million
- National films: $109 million (46.6%)

The Cinema of Turkey or Turkish cinema (also formerly known as Yeşilçam, which translates literally to Green Pine in Turkish), (Turkish pronunciation: [jeˈʃiltʃam]) or Türk sineması refers to the Turkish film art and industry. It is an important part of Turkish culture, and has flourished over the years, delivering entertainment to audiences in Turkey, Turkish expatriates across Europe, the Balkans & Eastern Europe, also more recently prospering in the Arab world alongside the Egyptian cinema and, to a lesser extent, the rest of the world.

The first film exhibited in the Ottoman Empire was the Lumière Brothers' 1895 film, L'Arrivée d'un train en gare de La Ciotat, which was shown in Constantinople (modern day Istanbul) in 1896. The Weavers (1905), by the Manaki brothers, was the first film made in the country. The earliest surviving film made in what is present-day Turkey was a documentary entitled Ayastefanos'taki Rus Abidesinin Yıkılışı (Demolition of the Russian Monument at San Stefano), directed by Fuat Uzkınay and completed in 1914. The first narrative film in Turkey is not known for certain.

Turkey's first sound film, Bir Millet Uyanıyor, was shown in 1931. Western dramatic elements were incorporated into improvised traditional Turkish theatrical storytelling forms such as Meddah, orta oyunu, and Karagöz and Hacivat with the foundations of the Darülbedayi in 1914 and Ankara State Conservatory in 1936. Due to their training format, theater actors moved away from cinema or they only did dubbing. Turkish cinema started to evolve in the 1960s. During the Yeşilçam era, Turkey was the world's 4th biggest producer of cinema.

== History ==
=== Overview ===
The Weavers (1905 film), by the Manaki brothers, was the first film made in the Ottoman Empire . 15-second clip showing the 114-year-old Despina Manaki spinning.

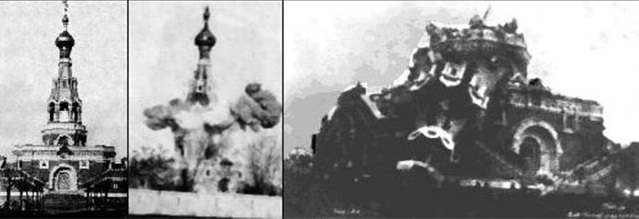
Ayastefanos′taki Rus Abidesinin Yıkılışı is a documentary filmed in 1914.

In terms of film production, Turkey shared the same fate with many of the national cinemas of the 20th century. Film production wasn't continuous until around the 1950s and the film market in general was run by a few major import companies that struggled for domination in the most population-dense and profitable cities such as Istanbul and İzmir. Film theatres rarely ever screened any locally produced films and the majority of the programs consisted of films of the stronger western film industries, especially those of the United States, France, Italy and Germany. Attempts at film production came primarily from multinational studios, which could rely on their comprehensive distribution networks together with their own theatre chains, thus guaranteeing them a return on their investment. Between the years 1896–1945, the number of locally produced films did not even reach 50 films in total, equal to less than a single year's annual film production in the 1950s and 1960s. Domestically produced films constituted only a small fraction of the total number of films screened in Turkey prior to the 1950s.

Film production in Turkey increased drastically after World War II. With a total of 49 films produced in 1952, this single year equaled a greater output produced in Turkey than all previous years combined. During the 1960s, Turkey became the fifth biggest film producer worldwide as annual film production reached the 300-film benchmark just at the beginning of the 1970s. Compared to other national cinemas, the achievements of the Turkish film industry after 1950 are still remarkable.

During the 1970s, the impact of TV and video as the new popular forms of media and political turmoil (often hand in hand with deep economic crises) caused a sharp drop in ticket sales, resulting in a steady decline starting around 1980 and continuing until the mid-1990s. The number of annual ticket sales decreased from a peak of 90 million tickets in 1966 to 56 million tickets in 1984 and only 11 million in 1990. Accordingly, the number of film theatres declined from approximately 2,000 in 1966 to 854 in 1984 and 290 in 1990. During the 1990s the average number of films produced per year remained between 10 and 15; usually half of them not even making it into the theatres.

Since 1995 the situation has improved. After the year 2000, annual ticket sales rose to 20 million and since 1995, the number of theatres has steadily increased to approximately 500 nationwide. Currently, Turkish films attract audiences of millions of viewers and routinely top the blockbuster lists, often surpassing foreign films at the box office. However, it is difficult to speak about the existence of an industry, since most films are rather individual projects of directors who otherwise earn their living in television, advertising or theatre. The distribution of these films are mainly handled by multinational corporations such as Warner Bros. and United International Pictures.

=== Pre-1950s ===
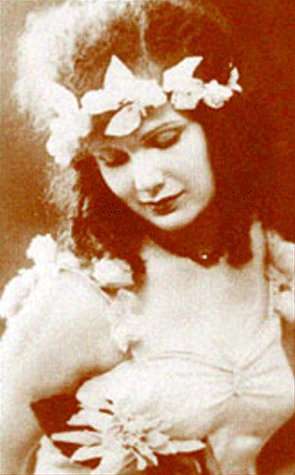
Feriha Tevfik, an actress and the first Miss Turkiye.

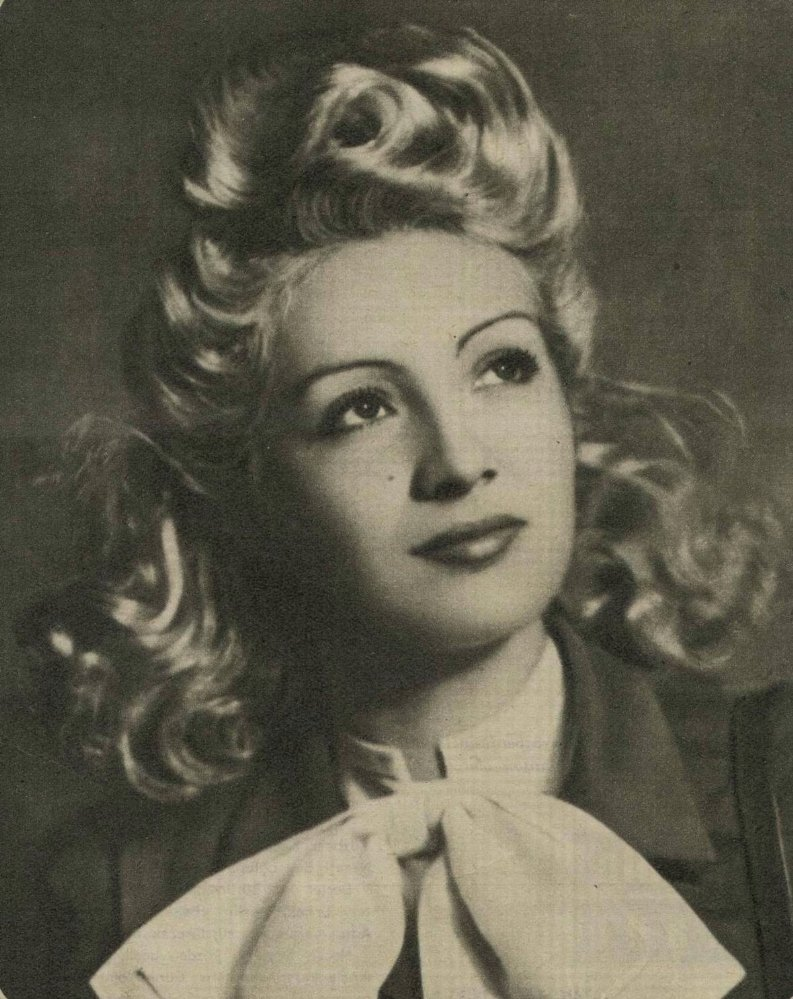
Cahide Sonku, actress and the first Turkish female film director.

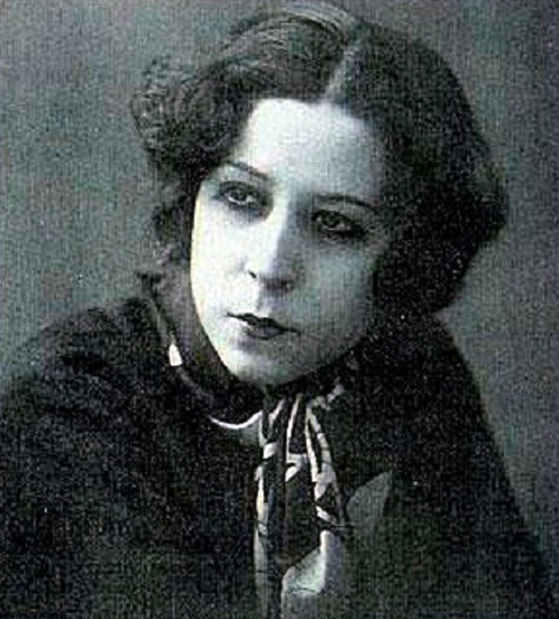
Afife Jale, the first Turkish theater actress.

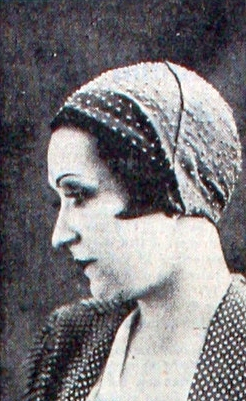
Bedia Muvahhit was the first Turkish movie actress.

From 1923 to 1939, Muhsin Ertuğrul was the only active film director in the country. He directed 29 films during this period, generally incorporating adaptions of plays, operettas, fiction and foreign films. The influence of the theater dating back to Uzkınay, Simavi, Ahmet Fehim and Şadi Karagözoğlu is very strong in Ertuğrul's work.

Most of the Turkish films produced before 1950 were projects initiated by import companies owned by local families, most notably İpek Film, a daughter company of the İpek Merchandise, an import company that was advertising in Ottoman literary journals such as Servet-i Fünun as early as the 19th century. Another important company in the early era of Turkish cinema was Kemal Film, a company whose continuous presence as a leading import company has been often overlooked for a few local films it produced during the 1920s. (The founders of Kemal Film bought their first film camera on loan from the Ipek Merchandise). Both companies were the strongest film distributors until the 1950s and the only companies that were financially sound enough to produce films themselves, with low risks for financial failure as they already were in possession of a distribution system and theatre chains that guaranteed a return on investment.

However, the notable developments of these companies must be seen as necessary adaptations to the technological progress of the western film industries whose films they were importing. One example here being the establishment of the Marmara Dubbing Studio in the early 1930s, when the silent era came to an end in the West and sound films became the standard, prompting the import-dependent companies to adjust themselves to the new technological requirements.

The big distributors in Istanbul, led by İpek Film and Kemal Film, gradually expanded their distribution system throughout the rest of the country during the 1930s, leading to the so-called "regional system" (Bölge İşletmeleri), which consisted of seven distribution areas headquartered in the most significant cities in those regions: Istanbul (Marmara Region), İzmir (Aegean Region), Ankara (Middle Anatolian Region), Samsun (Black Sea Region), Adana (Mediterranean Region), Erzurum (East Anatolian Region) and Diyarbakır (South East Anatolian Region). The Regional System became much more important after the 1950s, when local film production dramatically increased and local films surpassed imported films in both ticket sales and revenues. This system became the financial foundation of Yeşilçam (often referred to as "Turkish Hollywood"), which was the heart of Turkish film production between the years 1955–1975. After 1965, a so-called "Combined System" (Kombine Sistem) led by a trust of regional leaders is said to have taken control of almost everything regarding production. A leading figure of the trust was producer Türker İnanoğlu, who is still active in the media business today, running Ulusal Film, which was Turkey's largest TV production company.

The first film showing in Ottoman Empire was held in the Yıldız Palace, Istanbul in 1896. Public shows by Sigmund Weinberg in the Beyoğlu and Şehzadebaşı districts followed in 1897. Weinberg was already a prominent figure at that time, especially known as a representative of foreign companies such as Pathé, for whom he sold gramophones before getting into the film business. Some sources suggest he was also a photographer, again as a result of being one of the representatives of foreign companies such as Kodak.

The first movie in Ottoman Empire, Ayastefanos′taki Rus Abidesinin Yıkılışı, a documentary produced by Fuat Uzkınay in 1914, depicted the destruction of a Russian monument erected at the end of the 1877-1878 Russo-Ottoman War in Yeşilköy (then known as "San Stefano") following Ottoman Empire's entry into World War I. The first thematic films in Ottoman Empire were The Marriage of Himmet Aga (1916–1918), started by Weinberg and completed by Uzkinay, and The Paw (1917) and The Spy (1917), both by Sedat Simavi. The army-affiliated Central Cinema Directorate, a semi-military national defense society, and the Disabled Veterans Society were the producing organizations of that period.

In 1922, a major documentary film, Independence, the İzmir Victory, was made about the Turkish War of Independence. That same year, the first private movie studio, Kemal Film, commenced operations.

The years between 1939 and 1950 were a period of transition for Turkish cinema, during which it was greatly influenced by theater as well as by World War II. While there were only two film companies in 1939, the number increased to four between 1946 and 1950. After 1949, Turkish cinema was able to develop as a separate art form, with a more professional caliber of talents.

=== The Yeşilçam era ===
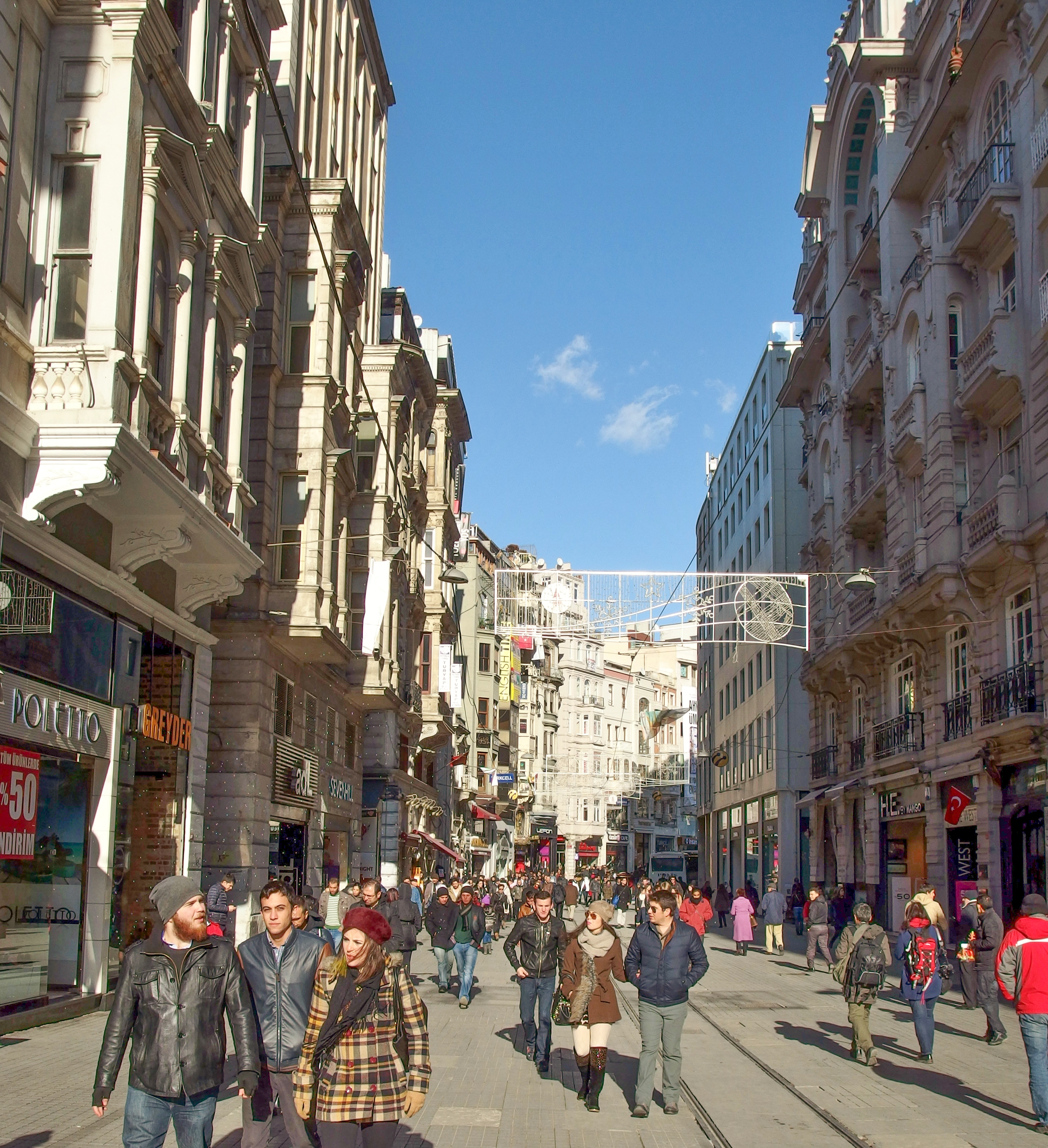
İstiklal Avenue in the Beyoğlu district of Istanbul where many actors, directors, crew members and studios were based.

Yeşilçam ("Green Pine") is a metonym for the Turkish film industry, similar to Hollywood in the United States. Yeşilçam is named after Yeşilçam Street in the Beyoğlu district of Istanbul where many actors, directors, crew members and studios were based.

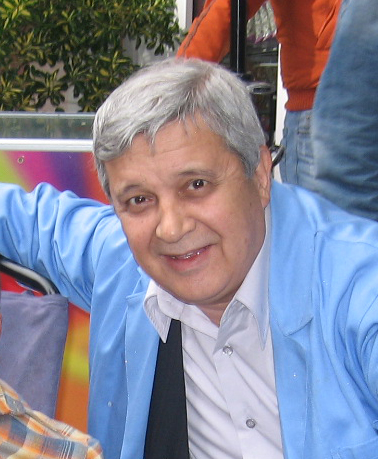
Halit Akçatepe was child actor. His father is a descendant of Fatma Sultan (daughter of Ahmed III), Nevşehirli Damat Ibrahim Pasha and played in Atıf Kaptan's first Turkish sound film.

Yeşilçam movies are known for iconic unforgotten songs. Soundtrack songs are still widely successful. It being called Turkish: Yeşilçam şarkıları or Turkish: Yeşilçam müzikleri.

Some famous partners of Yeşilçam are

- Emel Sayın-Tarık Akan
- Fatma Girik-Cüneyt Arkın
- Türkan Şoray-Kadir İnanır
- Gülşen Bubikoğlu-Tarık Akan
- Kemal Sunal-Şener Şen-Halit Akçatepe
- Adile Naşit-Münir Özkul
- Metin Akpınar-Zeki Alasya
- Filiz Akın-Ediz Hun
- Ayhan Işık-Belgin Doruk.

Yeşilçam experienced its heyday from the 1950s to the 1970s, when it produced 250 to 350 films annually. Between 1950 and 1966 more than fifty movie directors practiced film arts in Turkey. Ömer Lütfi Akad strongly influenced the period, but Ertem Eğilmez, Osman Fahir Seden, Atıf Yılmaz, and Memduh Ün made the most films.

The film Susuz Yaz, made by Metin Erksan, alongside Hülya Koçyiğit won the Golden Bear Award at the Berlin Film Festival in 1964. This honor was the first of its kind ever bestowed upon a Turkish movie. Cüneyt Gökçer's students Kartal Tibet and Hülya Koçyiğit who started in theatre as child actors are one of first cinema stars who graduated from theatre department of State Conservatory. Also Kartal Tibet was professional basketball player and Hülya Koçyiğit was ballet dancer. After they played together in many films. Kartal Tibet as director, screenwriter and Hülya Koçyiğit as productor worked together in classic films. Also, Kartal Tibet worked as director in TV industry. He helped to launch for acting style in beginning of career of new TV stars who Turkish TV series increased international popularity and won awards like International Emmy Award.

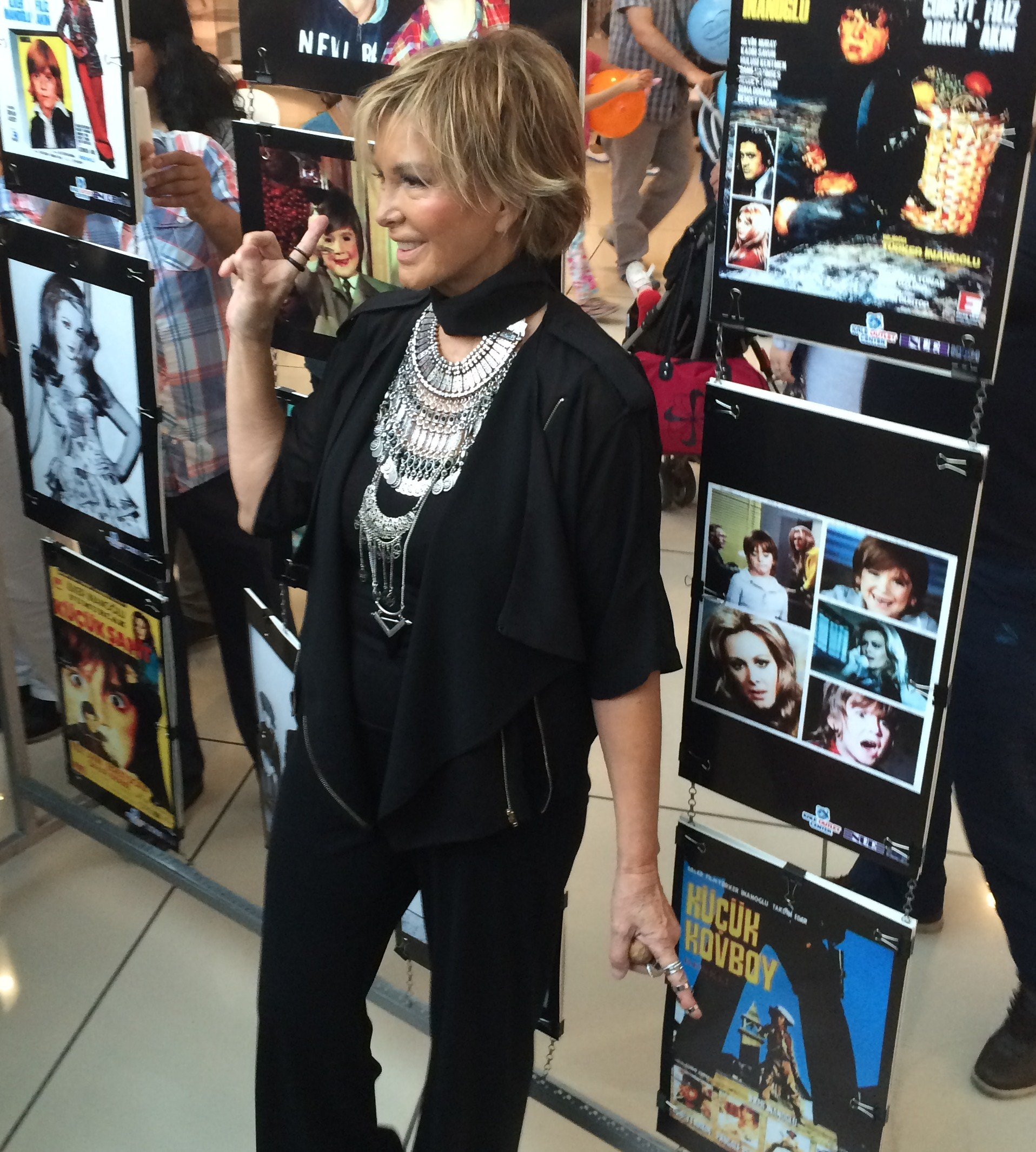
Filiz Akın is actress and official ambassador, due to her husband is Turkey's Ambassador to France

The number of cinemagoers and the number of films made constantly increased, especially after 1958. In the 1960s the programs of the theater departments in the Language, History and Geography faculties of Ankara University and Istanbul University included cinema courses, as did the Press and Publications High School of Ankara University. A cinema branch was also established in the Art History Department of the State Fine Arts Academy.

The Union of Turkish Film Producers and the State Film Archives both date from the 1960s. The State Film Archives became the Turkish Film Archives in 1969. During the same period, the Cinema-TV Institute was founded and annexed to the State Academy of Fine Arts. The Turkish State Archives also became part of this organization. In 1962, the Cinema-TV Institute became a department of Mimar Sinan University. Well-known directors of the 1960–1970 period include Metin Erksan, Atıf Yılmaz, Memduh Ün, Halit Refiğ, Duygu Sağıroğlu, Remzi Aydın Jöntürk and Nevzat Pesen. In 1970, the numbers of cinemas and cinemagoers rose spectacularly. In the 2,424 cinemas around the country, films were viewed by a record number of 247 million viewers.

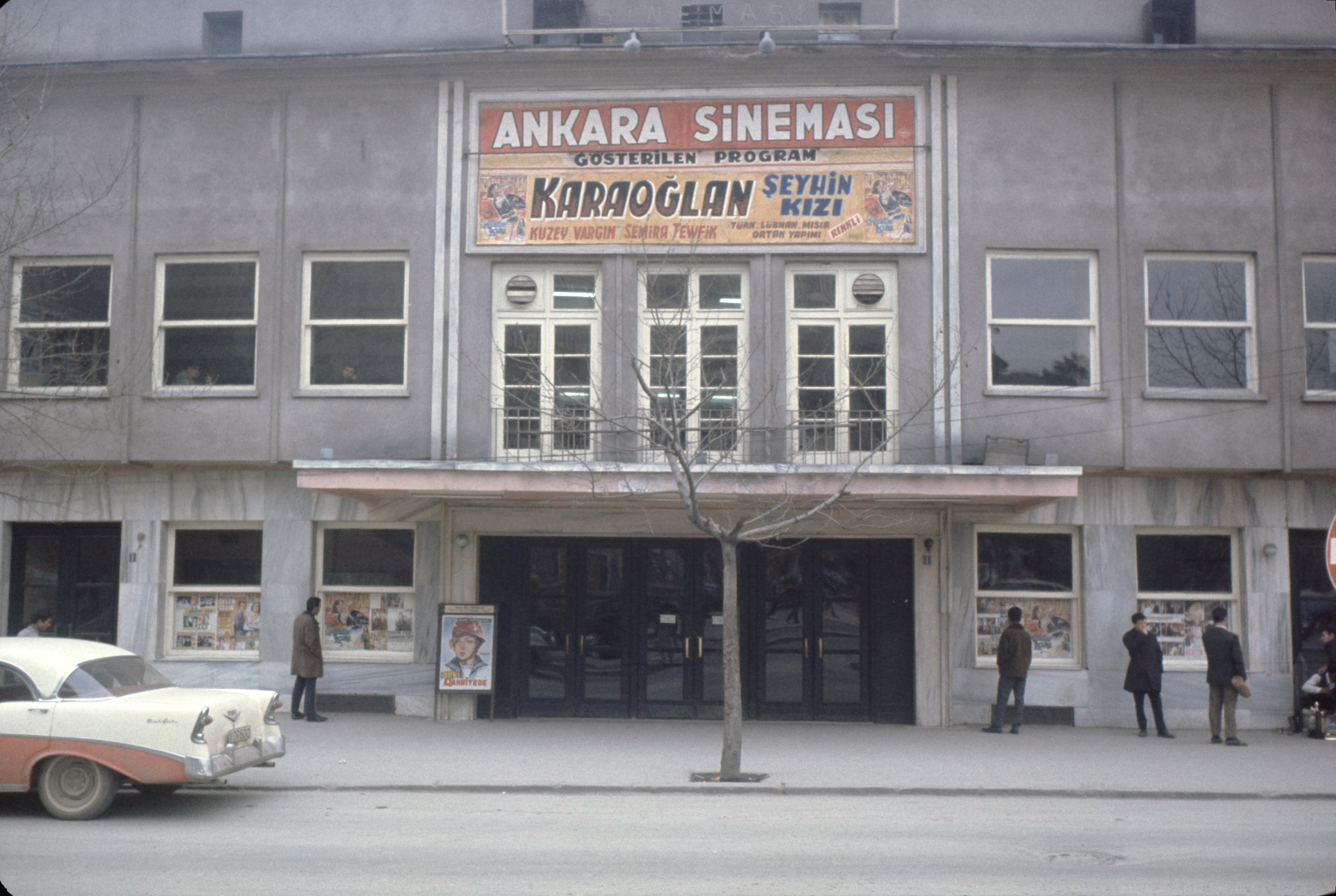
A Cinema in Ankara circa 1970

In 1970, approximately 220 films were made and this figure reached 300 in 1972. Turkish cinema gave birth to its legendary stars during this period, notable examples being Kemal Sunal, Kadir İnanır, Türkan Şoray and Şener Şen. After this period, however, the cinema began to lose its audiences, due to nationwide TV broadcasts. After 1970, a new and younger generation of directors emerged, but they had to cope with an increased demand for video films after 1980.

Yeşilçam's actresses featured included Emel Sayın, Adile Naşit, Zerrin Egeliler, Itır Esen, Filiz Akın, Fatma Girik, Hülya Koçyiğit, Gülşen Bubikoğlu, Türkan Şoray, Belgin Doruk, Hülya Avşar, Oya Aydoğan, Perihan Savaş, Necla Nazır, Çolpan İlhan, Ayşen Gruda, Nevra Serezli, Müjde Ar, Perran Kutman and Yeşilçam actors are Tarık Akan, Şener Şen, Cüneyt Arkın, Göksel Arsoy, Kemal Sunal, Kadir İnanır, Müşfik Kenter, Münir Özkul, Halit Akçatepe, Hulusi Kentmen, Zeki Alasya, Metin Akpınar, Ediz Hun, Kartal Tibet, Ayhan Işık, Sadri Alışık, Zeki Müren, Ekrem Bora, Metin Serezli, Hüseyin Peyda, Ahmet Mekin, Tamer Yiğit, Kenan Pars, Rüştü Asyalı, Kamran Usluer, Erol Taş, Önder Somer, Müjdat Gezen, Salih Güney, Sertan Acar, Yılmaz Güney, Orhan Gencebay.

1970s and 1980s also brought the genre of Turksploitation - low-budget exploitation films that were either remakes of, or used unauthorized footage from popular foreign films (particularly Hollywood movies) and television series.

Yeşilçam suffered due to the spread of television and the widespread political violence at the end of the 1970s. Yeşilçam totally ended after the 1980 Turkish coup d'état. Increased production costs and difficulties in the import of raw materials brought about a decrease in the number of films made in the 1970s, but the quality of films improved.

=== Decline of Yeşilçam and the post-Yeşilçam era ===
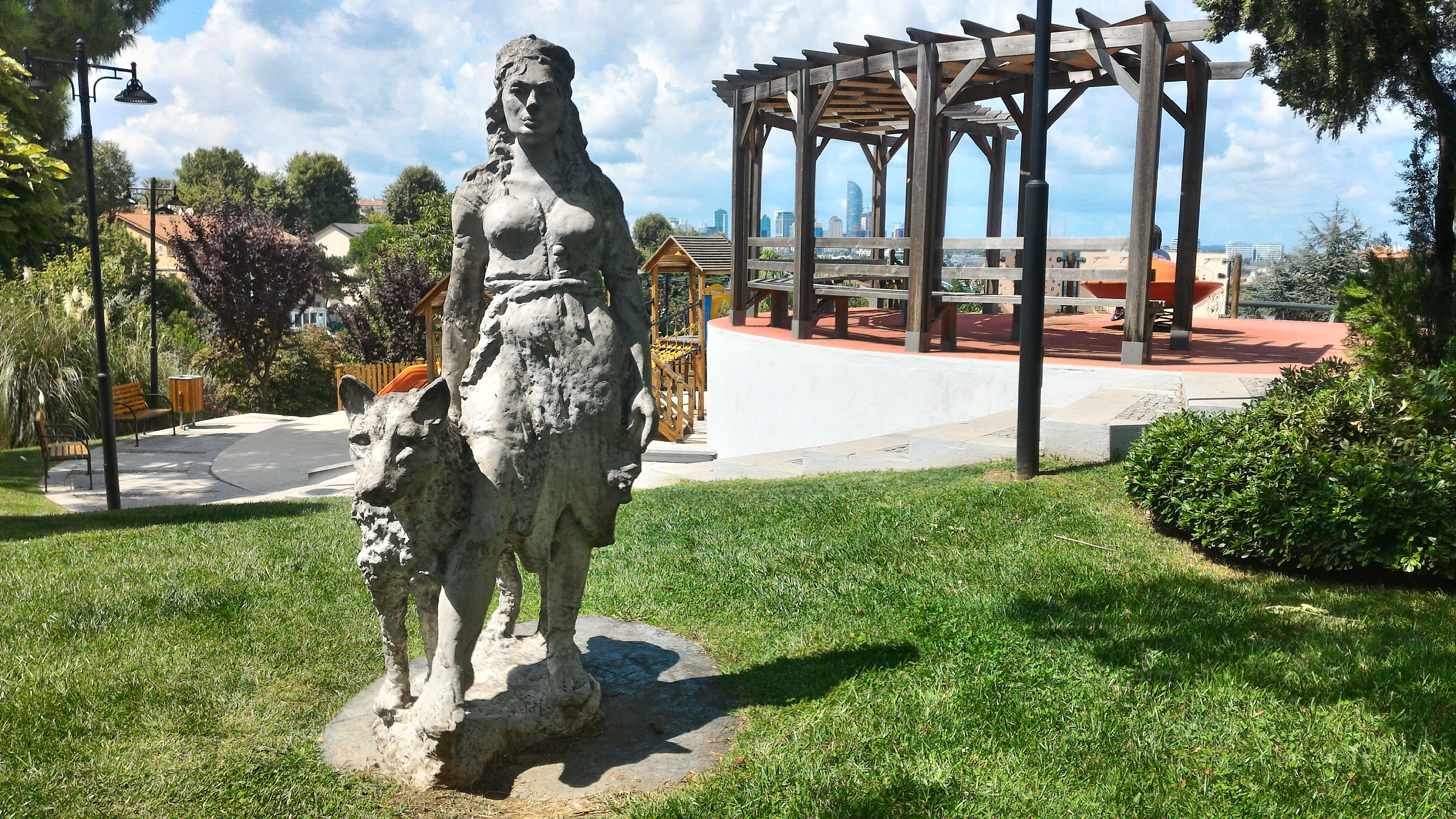
Statue of Türkan Şoray. With 222 films, She has starred in the most feature films for actress worldwide to her name in the Guinness Book of Records.

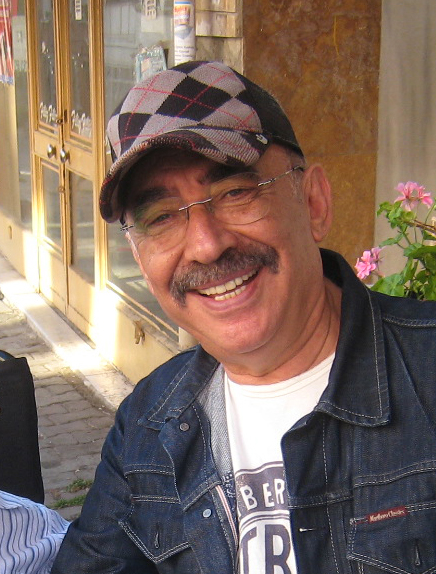
Şener Şen received the distinction of "Turkish state artist".

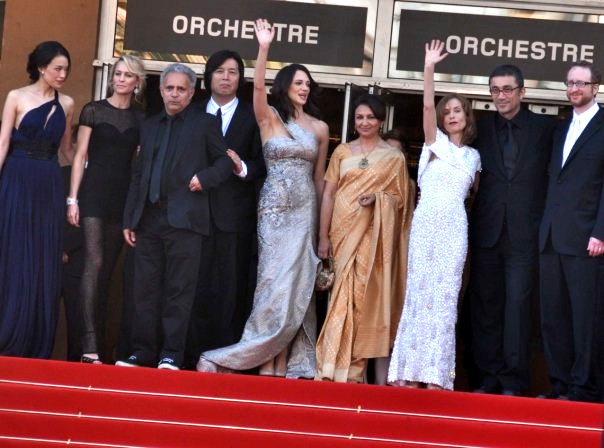
Nuri Bilge Ceylan among the jury of the feature films selection at the 2009 Cannes Film Festival

In the early nineties, there were barely two or three movies released per year. During this period, most of the seventies' stars had either moved to TV, or were trying to rebuild the Yeşilçam's former glory. Some of the notable examples of this era are Eşkıya (The Bandit) and Züğürt Ağa (The Agha), both starring Şener Şen. Both movies were critically and commercially acclaimed.

However, the resurgence of Yesilçam didn't truly take place until the release of Vizontele in 2001. The film was directed, written, and starred by Yılmaz Erdoğan, who was already well known from his long-running sitcom Bir Demet Tiyatro, and his dedication to theatre. The movie starred the cast of his usual plays, most notably Demet Akbağ, Altan Erkekli, and Cem Yılmaz. This movie's huge commercial success (watched by 2.5 million viewers, which earned the movie the most viewed film for its day) brought attention to the industry. This, and Vizontele's sequel Vizontele Tuuba, broke Vizontele's records by achieving 3.5 million and 3 million viewers, respectively.

Yeşilçam has seen a revival since 2002, having produced critically acclaimed movies such as Uzak (Grand Prix (Cannes Film Festival), 2003) and Propaganda.

A few years later, Cem Yılmaz released his own film, G.O.R.A., which he both wrote and starred in. Cem Yılmaz's second movie Hokkabaz (The Magician) .

Since then, larger-budgeted films have been produced, including notable examples such as Kurtlar Vadisi: Irak (Valley of the Wolves: Iraq), which was viewed by a record 4 million people, Babam ve Oğlum (My Father and My Son).

There has been a rise in experimental films in the 2000s. These include the 2005 feature Türev, which was filmed without a prewritten script and even featured candid shots of the actors, and Anlat Istanbul (Istanbul Tales), an ensemble piece divided into five "mini films" that received a strong reception.

"Körler / Jaluziler İçin" is the first internationally awarded Turkish science fiction feature film which is not a comedy, a cult film, a remake or an animation which marks its unique place as a milestone in the history of Turkish cinema. It was written, directed, produced and edited by Ozan Duru Adam. The film invents an innovative, unconventional visual language.

Production numbers also soared in the second half of the 2000s, reaching 40 films in 2007, with the top four box office hits that year claimed by Turkish films, as the film industry became profitable again with improving technical quality corresponding with commercial films' production costs increasing.

In 2015, number of admission per capita was 0.8. Also Sinemia has published a research that Konya has become the city with the most frequent cinema goers.

== Collaborations of Turkish Comedy ==
Due to, Turkish TV series are too long for comedy. Comedy is more popular in cinema and theater. Storytellers Meddah, Aytysh, Ozan have risk of getting lost in new generation. Traditional Turkish theater from Ottoman Empire has orta oyunu, Karagöz and Hacivat for comedy. Turkish folklore comedy figures have Keloğlan, Nasreddin. Accent comedy and quick answer are common in daily life. Black Sea Region humour is the most popular. Supporting role in drama film has comedy in daily life. Despite this, Turkish comedy movies have novelty. It hasn't humour style in daily life.

=== 1960s Turist Ömer ===
Sadri Alışık played iconic character Turist Ömer. In Ayhan Işık’s drama film, Sadri Alışık is partner for comedy. The franchise films “Turist Ömer” has parody of Star Trek, Awaara. Sadri Alışık is musical stand-up comedian. Ayhan Işık and Sadri Alışık graduated from picture department of Fine Art State Academy.

=== 1970s Arzu Film Production ===
- Kemal Sunal, Şener Şen, Halit Akçatepe are partners in many films.
  - Kemal Sunal comedy movies were directed by actor Kartal Tibet and were produced by actress Hülya Koçyiğit. Kartal Tibet and Hülya Koçyiğit studied at theater department of Ankara State Conservatory and played together in many drama films. Kartal Tibet was assistant director of Ertem Eğilmez who founded production company Arzu Film.
  - Şener Şen is son of actor Ali Şen and has iconic comedy and drama roles in his career.
  - Halit Akçatepe's parents are actor Sıtkı Akçatepe and actress Leman Akçatepe. His last film is franchise films Geniş Aile (2009–2019).
- Adile Naşit and Münir Özkul are old couple in many films.
  - Adile Naşit's parents are comedian Naşit Özcan and actress Amelya Hanım.
  - Münir Özkul is also acting teacher. His student Müjdat Gezen made own films and is acting teacher. Müjdat Gezen's students are İlker Ayrık, Ezgi Mola in franchise films.
- Zeki Alasya, Metin Akpınar are duo in cinema and theatre. They founded “Devekuşu Kabare Tiyatrosu”, the first cabaret theater of Turkey.

=== Olacak O Kadar ===
Levent Kırca and his wife Oya Başar wrote, played, produced in long-running sketches, Olacak O Kadar (1988–2010).

=== BKM Film Production ===
Yılmaz Erdoğan became chief screenwriter Olacak O Kadar.

- Yılmaz Erdoğan founded BKM Production.
  - He wrote, played and produced in the play with audience Bir Demet Tiyatro (1995–2007). Also, He founded professial sketch crews in Bkm.
  - Yılmaz Erdoğan directed sketches Çok Güzel Hareketler Bunlar for all crew that both screenwriter and actor.
    - The sketches "Güldür Güldür" who different styles directed by Kemal Sunal's son Ali Sunal.
    - The child sketches "Güldüy Güldüy" directed by Kemal Sunal's daughter Ezo Sunal.
- Yılmaz Erdoğan wrote, directed and worked as actor in franchise films Vizontele, Organize İşler, with comedians Cem Yılmaz, Tolga Çevik, Ata Demirer who wrote own films.

=== 2000s Films of Stand up comedian ===
Comedians Cem Yılmaz, Tolga Çevik, Ata Demirer played as actor in Yılmaz Erdoğan’s franchise films Vizontele, Organize İşler and Gülse Birsel’s Avrupa Yakası. Tolga Çevik married to Cem Yılmaz's sister.

- Tolga Çevik was a student of Robin Williams and Tommy Lee Jones. He is improvisation actor. He works with his cousin Sarp Bozkurt and Ezgi Mola.
- Comedian and cartoonist Cem Yılmaz wrote with his brother Can Yılmaz in own films.
  - The fictional character Arif Işık in franchise film G.O.R.A is a derivative of Turist Ömer. As cameo, Sadri Alışık’s son Kerem Alışık played Turist Ömer. Mert Fırat portrayed Sadri Alışık.
- Ata Demirer is also musician and best known for imitation, accent ability in own films.

=== Films of Women Auteur ===
After female pioneer comedy actresses Adile Naşit, Ayşen Gruda, Perran Kutman, Oya Başar, Demet Akbağ.

- Gülse Birsel wrote and played in franchise films. She works as actor with comedians Cem Yılmaz, Tolga Çevik, Ata Demirer who wrote own films. She worked with comedy actresses Binnur Kaya, Demet Evgar, Hasibe Eren, İrem Sak, Nurgül Yeşilçay, Aslı İnandık, Yasemin Sakallıoğlu.
  - After Gonca Vuslateri worked as actress with Gülse Birsel. She wrote and played in own film.
  - After Gupse Özay worked as actress with Gülse Birsel. She wrote, played and directed in own films. Gupse Özay’s films is about women.

=== Screenwriter-Productor’s Films ===
- The cartoonist Gani Müjde founded “Tükenmez Kalem Production”. He wrote historical comedy and surreal comedy.
- Birol Güven founded “Mint Production”. He wrote family comedies. He worked comedian and director Hamdi Alkan.

=== 2010s Modern Comedy ===
Auteurs Burak Aksak and Selçuk Aydemir are cousins.

- Selçuk Aydemir wrote and directed in own films.
  - After Emrah Kaman works as screenwriter and actor with Selçuk Aydemir. Emrah Kaman and his brothers Murat Kaman, Eray Kaman wrote and played in own films.
  - Burak Satıbol, Ayhan Taş from improvisation crew Mahşer-i Cümbüş worked.
  - Murat Cemcir, Ahmet Kural are duo actors in franchise films. Murat Cemcir is producer.
- Burak Aksak wrote, directed in surreal comedy films.
  - Onur Ünlü wrote, directed, played in surreal drama film. He worked as director in hit surreal comedy Leyla ile Mecnun.
  - Ali Atay, Feyyaz Yiğit, Aziz Kedi wrote, played, directed in own films.
  - Zeynep Çamcı wrote, played, directed in own film.

== Cultural influence ==
Turkish television has enjoyed wide viewership outside of Turkey, with turkish soap operas popular in multiple countries reaching audiences as far as Bangladesh. Muslim Turkiye's soap operas' influence has eroded the dominance of Indian shows in Bangladesh. Turkey's cultural influence is a mark of Turkish soft power as defined by Joseph Nye, with its worldwide television distribution only behind the United States (2019). In Bangladesh, the popularity of turkish shows has led to the popularity of Turkish or Turkish influenced brands and fashion, even fashion inspire by the Ottoman Empire.

According to The Guardian, in 2019, Chile was the world's leading consumer of Turkish dizi. Turkish drama shows are also popular in Russia, Latin America, Korea and China. The popularity of a Turkish show, "Magnificent Century" led to an increase in Arab tourism to Turkey. According to The Guardian, the Turkish government has used Turkish shows to project soft power. Government backed shows depict the Ottoman heroes battling Christians and Mongols, showing the power of the Ottoman Empire and prominent figures from its history. Another government backed show showcases Turks fighting European powers in the early 20th century. Critics said the shows have similarities to current political situations. attempting to depict President Erdoğan as akin to a powerful sultan fending off European powers.

== Legal issues ==
Although the need for a cinema law has been frequently debated throughout the history of the Turkish Republic, until 1986 no specific law or regulation had been developed. While films have generally been treated as goods subject to laws regarding taxation, content-wise they were controlled by commissions that have been often criticized for being mechanisms of censorship.

In the 1930s, some members of the parliament raised the issue of whether films would have a bad impact on children. This was a popular theme at that time, not just in Turkey, but also in the United States and elsewhere in the world. Later, in the 1960s, a debate around the so-called "Baykam Law" which was proposed by Suphi Baykam became quite famous for the tension it created amongst the parliamentarians and the stakeholders in the industry. In 1977 and 1978, further discussions for a cinema law have been held, but without any result.

Finally, in 1986, a cinema law, though highly criticised by members of the industry and the cinema intelligentsia of that time, was passed by the parliament and has since been the fundamental legislative document regarding cinema issues in Turkey. The new law aimed to ensure support for those working in cinema and music. A reorganization of the film industry began in 1987 to address problems and assure its development. The Ministry of Culture established the "Professional Union of Owners of Turkish Works of Cinema" the same year.

The "Copyrights and General Directorate of Cinema" was founded in 1989 as well as a "Support Fund for the Cinema and Musical Arts". This fund is used to provide financial support to the film sector.

=== Rating systems and censorship ===
One of the most interesting studies on the issue of film censorship in Turkey is Alim Şerif Onaran's Sinematografik Hürriyet (Cinematic Freedom), published in 1968 by the Ministry of Internal Affairs, but written in 1963 and being the first study in Turkey which received a PhD for a topic related to film. This study is still the most important -if not only- study on the film evaluation methods applied in Turkey before the 1950s. Onaran himself being active as a member of the Film Rating Commission in his younger years, was a true expert on the topic, and his research also includes examples of the late Ottoman Period. Ironically, Onaran became one of the most important intellectuals on film in Turkey, owing his wealth of knowledge on early world film history to the years he spent watching the films he was enrolled to evaluate as a committee member.

A very interesting example on the level of absurdity that censorship could reach is mentioned in Çetin Yetkin's book Siyasal Iktidar Sanata Karşı (Political Regime vs Art), published in 1970. It tells the story of a film which was classified as "inappropriate for export" because the Evaluation Committee decided that the film contains "communist propaganda". The film-owner, who applied to the committee for an export certificate, was surprised to see the decision because he mentioned on his application form that his intention was to sell a copy of the film to a distributor in the Soviet Union, the world's leading communist country at that time.

== Important figures ==
=== Directors ===
- Atıf Yılmaz
- Çağan Irmak
- Ertem Eğilmez
- Faruk Aksoy
- Fatih Akın
- Ferzan Özpetek
- Halit Refiğ
- Kartal Tibet
- Kutluğ Ataman
- Memduh Ün
- Metin Erksan
- Nejat Saydam
- Nesli Çölgeçen
- Nuri Bilge Ceylan
- Osman Sınav
- Ömer Kavur
- Reha Erdem
- Remzi Aydın Jöntürk
- Semih Kaplanoğlu
- Sinan Çetin
- Şerif Gören
- Tunç Başaran
- Türker İnanoğlu
- Ümit Ünal
- Yavuz Özkan
- Yavuz Turgul
- Yeşim Ustaoğlu
- Yılmaz Güney
- Zeki Demirkubuz
- Zeki Ökten

=== Scriptwriters ===
- Attilâ İlhan
- Bülent Oran
- Kemal Tahir
- Orhan Kemal
- Orhan Pamuk
- Ümit Ünal
- Yavuz Turgul

=== On-screen couples ===
Many famous and pioneering couples from the Golden Age of the 1970s acted together in films. They were cultural icons of Turkish style. These films typically tell love stories. Among these couples are Cüneyt Arkın and Fatma Girik, Gülşen Bubikoğlu and Tarık Akan, Emel Sayın and Akan, Türkan Şoray and Kadir İnanır, Filiz Akın and Ediz Hun, and Adile Naşit and Münir Özkul.

== Notable films ==
=== Classics ===
- Aile Şerefi
- Adı Vasfiye
- Ah Nerede
- Ateş Böceği
- Atla Gel Şaban
- Anayurt Oteli
- Arabesk
- Aşk Filmlerinin Unutulmaz Yönetmeni
- Ayna
- Ayşecik series
- Bak Yeşil Yeşil
- Bekçiler Kralı
- Bir Araya Gelemeyiz
- Bizim Aile
- Canım Kardeşim
- Çıplak Vatandaş
- Çiçek Abbas
- Çöpçüler Kralı
- Delisin
- Dokuzuncu Hariciye Koğuşu
- Dolap Beygiri
- Duvar
- Gelin
- Gülen Adam
- Gülen Gözler
- Gırgırıye series
- Hababam Sınıfı
- Hayat Sevince Güzel
- Japon İşi
- Kanlı Nigar
- Kara Gözlüm
- Karaoğlan
- Kibar Feyzo
- Korkusuz Korkak
- Maden
- Malkoçoğlu series
- Mavi Boncuk
- Muhsin Bey
- Namuslu
- Ne Olacak Şimdi
- Neşeli Günler
- Ortadirek Şaban
- Piyano Piyano Bacaksız
- Postacı
- Salak Milyoner series
- Satın Alınan Koca
- Selamsız Bandosu
- Selvi Boylum, Al Yazmalım
- Sevmek Zamanı
- Sosyete Şaban
- Susuz Yaz
- Sürü
- Süt Kardeşler
- Şaban Oğlu Şaban
- Şafak Bekçileri
- Şalvar Davası
- Şekerpare
- Şendul Şaban
- Tarkan series
- Tatlı Dillim
- Tosun Paşa
- Turist Ömer series
- Uçurtmayı Vurmasınlar
- Umut
- Üç Arkadaş
- Vesikalı Yarim
- Yalancı Yarim
- Yazgı
- Yeryüzünde Bir Melek
- Yılanların Öcü
- Yol
- Yumurcak series
- Zübük
- Züğürt Ağa

=== Modern era films ===
- Ahlat Ağacı
- Anlat İstanbul
- Beş Vakit
- Bir Zamanlar Anadolu'da
- Bornova Bornova
- Eşkıya
- Gönül Yarası
- İki Genç Kız
- İklimler
- Kader
- Kasaba
- Kış Uykusu
- Kurak Günler
- Kuru Otlar Üstüne
- Masumiyet
- Mayıs Sıkıntısı
- Mustafa Hakkında Her Şey
- Sarmaşık
- Sıfır Dediğimde
- Türev
- Uzak
- Uzak İhtimal
- Zerre
- Zenne Dancer
- Körler / Jaluziler İçin - For The Blinds

=== Cult films ===
- Canım Kardeşim
- Hababam Sınıfı series
- 3 Dev Adam
- Ayşecik series
- Kilink: Soy ve Öldür
- Malkoçoğlu series
- Nuri Alço movies
- Tarkan series
- Turist Ömer series
- Yıkılmayan Adam

=== Commercial successes ===
- A.R.O.G
- Babam ve Oğlum
- Beyaz Melek
- Beynelmilel
- Beyza'nın Kadınları
- Five Minarets in New York
- Fetih 1453
- G.O.R.A.
- Hokkabaz
- I Saw the Sun
- Recep İvedik
- Karpuz Kabuğundan Gemiler Yapmak
- Kurtlar Vadisi: Irak
- Miracle in Cell No. 7
- Mustang
- Organize İşler
- Sınav
- Vizontele
- Çakallarla Dans
- Çakallarla Dans 2: Hastasıyız Dede
- Kaybedenler Kulübü
- Düğün Dernek

=== Indie films ===
- Time to Love
- Umut
- Gemide
- Cogunluk
- Toll Booth (film)
- Zer
- Sivas

=== Short films ===
Last years's short films indicates the Turkish Cinema's future style and its new director generation. There are countless number of Turkish short films received awards both in national and international festivals. Here are some of it: -Kefaret (2016), directed by Ali Kışlar -Kronos (2019) -Lütfi (2016), directed by Cahit Kaya Demir -Balık (2019), directed by Ercan Bayraktar -Mother Mariam (2020), directed by Mustafa Gürbüz -Story of a Job Interview (2017), directed by Alkım Özmen http://www.kameraarkasi.org/yonetmenler/kisafilmler/birisgorusmesihikayesi.html -Suclular / The Criminals (2020), directed by Serhat Karaaslan

== Old Turkish actors and actresses ==
- Ali Şen
- Adile Naşit
- Ahmet Mekin
- Ajda Pekkan
- Aliye Rona
- Ayhan Işık
- Ayla Algan
- Ayşen Gruda
- Aytaç Arman
- Ayten Gökçer
- Bedia Muvahhit
- Belgin Doruk
- Burçin Oraloğlu
- Bülent Ersoy
- Cahide Sonku
- Cüneyt Arkın
- Cüneyt Gökçer
- Çolpan İlhan
- Ediz Hun
- Ekrem Bora
- Emel Sayın
- Erdal Özyağcılar
- Erol Evgin
- Erol Günaydın
- Erol Taş
- Eşref Kolçak
- Fatma Girik
- Ferdi Tayfur
- Fikret Hakan
- Filiz Akın
- Füsun Önal
- Gazanfer Özcan
- Göksel Arsoy
- Gönül Yazar
- Gülşen Bubikoğlu
- Hale Soygazi
- Halil Ergün
- Halit Akçatepe
- Haluk Bilginer
- Hulusi Kentmen
- Hülya Avşar
- Hülya Koçyiğit
- Hüseyin Peyda
- Itır Esen
- İbrahim Tatlıses
- İzzet Günay
- Kadir İnanır
- Kadir Savun
- Kamran Usluer
- Kartal Tibet
- Kemal Sunal
- Kenan Kalav
- Kenan Pars
- Kerem Yılmazer
- Leman Çıdamlı
- Leyla Sayar
- Metin Akpınar
- Metin Serezli
- Muhterem Nur
- Muhsin Ertuğrul
- Muzaffer Tema
- Müjdat Gezen
- Müjde Ar
- Münir Özkul
- Mürüvvet Sim
- Müşfik Kenter
- Nebahat Çehre
- Necla Nazır
- Nevra Serezli
- Nubar Terziyan
- Nur Sürer
- Nuri Sencer
- Orhan Gencebay
- Oya Aydoğan
- Önder Somer
- Öztürk Serengil
- Perihan Savaş
- Perran Kutman
- Rüştü Asyalı
- Sadri Alışık
- Salih Güney
- Selda Alkor
- Sertan Acar
- Şener Şen
- Şevket Altuğ
- Tarık Akan
- Tamer Yiğit
- Tuncel Kurtiz
- Türkan Şoray
- Yıldız Kenter
- Yılmaz Güney
- Zeki Alasya
- Zeki Müren
- Zeynep Değirmencioğlu

== Major events ==
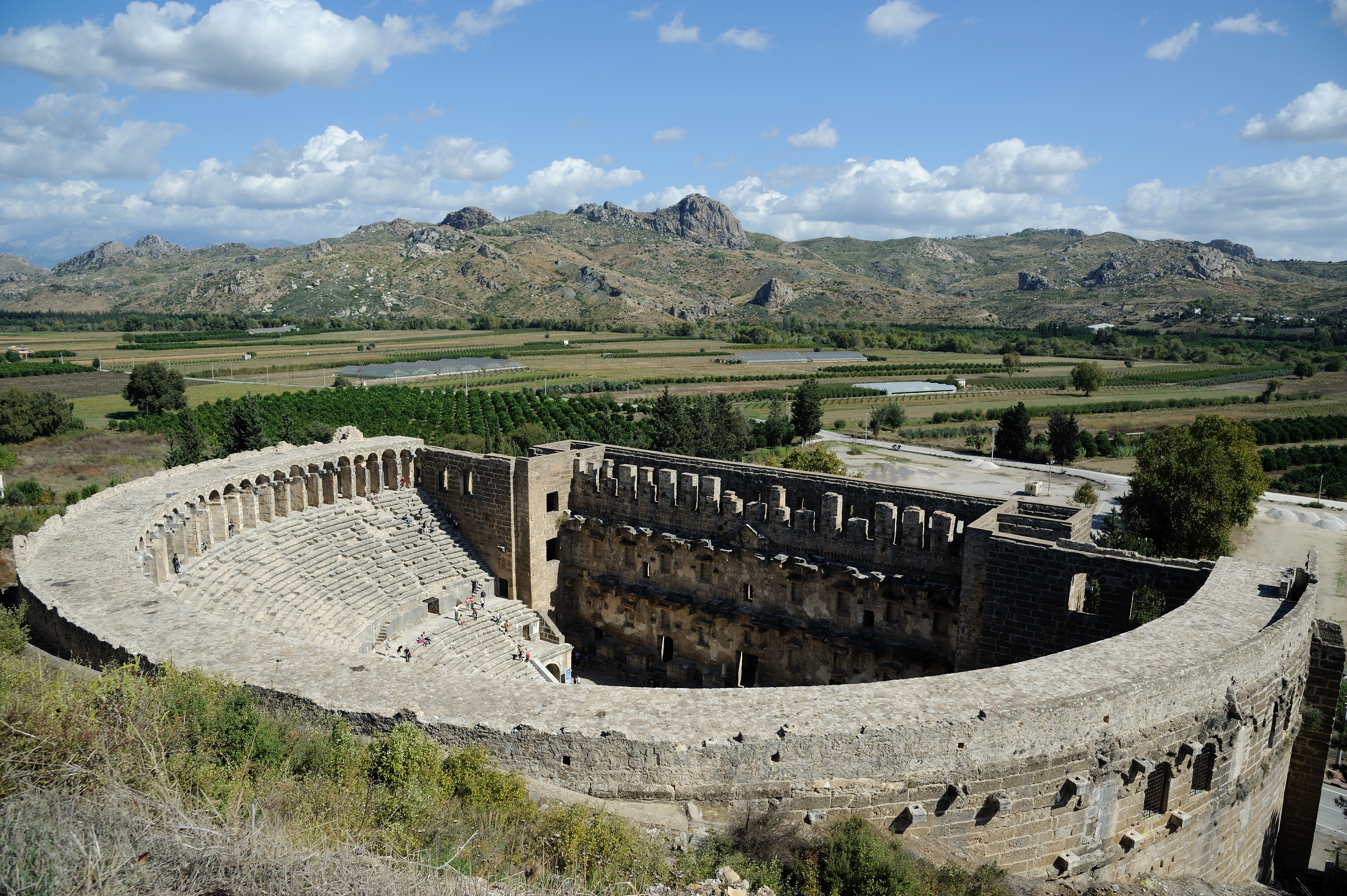
Closing ceremony of International Antalya Golden Orange Film Festival was made in Aspendos.

=== Festivals ===
- Adana Film Festival - Another important film festival held annually in the city of Adana. Its top award is the Golden Boll received in the past by such prominent figures as Yılmaz Güney, who himself grew up in Adana.
- Ankara Flying Broom Women's Film Festival - (Turkish: Uçan Süpürge) (Flying Broom) is Turkey's only festival devoted to Feminism and Gender-Issues. The festival is held on an annual basis in Ankara. The festival aims to support young women in making their debut-films and organizes workshops on scriptwriting and film-making.
- International Antalya Golden Orange Film Festival - The most prestigious and popular festival in Turkey. Each year participants are rewarded with the Altın Portakal for outstanding performances in categories such as best film, best director, and best actor/actress.
- İstanbul Uluslararası Film Festivali - First held in 1982, this annual film festival is one of the most important intellectual events in Turkey, often causing many cineastes living outside of Istanbul to go there for vacation to see the most precious examples of world film history presented there.

=== Major international awards ===
- Golden Bear in 14th Berlin International Film Festival: Susuz Yaz
- Golden Leopard in 1979 Locarno International Film Festival: The Herd
- Jury Grand Prix in 33rd Berlin International Film Festival: A Season in Hakkari
- Palme d'Or in 1982 Cannes Film Festival: Yol
- Golden Goblet Award for Best Feature Film in 1999 Shanghai International Film Festival: Propaganda
- Grand Prix in 2003 Cannes Film Festival: Uzak
- Golden Bear in 54th Berlin International Film Festival: Head-On
- Golden Shell in 2008 San Sebastián International Film Festival: Pandora's Box
- Golden Bear in 60th Berlin International Film Festival: Honey
- Grand Prix in 2011 Cannes Film Festival: Once Upon a Time in Anatolia
- Golden Goblet Award for Best Feature Film in 2011 Shanghai International Film Festival: Hayde Bre
- Grand Prix des Amériques in 2012 Montreal World Film Festival: Where the Fire Burns
- Golden George in 2013 Moscow International Film Festival: Particle
- Palme d'Or in 2014 Cannes Film Festival: Kış Uykusu
- Special Jury Prize in 71st Venice International Film Festival: Sivas.

== Cinema-related organizations ==
=== Film schools ===
- Akdeniz University Faculty of Communication, Radio-TV-Cinema Department, Antalya
- Anadolu University Cinema and TV Department, Eskişehir
- Ankara University Faculty of Communication, Department of Radio, Television and Film, Ankara
- Bahçeşehir University Faculty of Communication, Department of Film and Television, İstanbul
- Beykent University Faculty of Fine Arts, Department of Cinema and TV, Istanbul
- Bilkent University Communication and Design Department, Ankara
- Çanakkale Onsekiz Mart University Faculty of Fine Arts, Department of Cinema and Television, Çanakkale
- Dokuz Eylül University Faculty of Fine Arts, Department of Film Design, İzmir
- Ege University Radio-TV-Cinema Department, İzmir
- Galatasaray University Faculty of Communication, Radio-TV-Cinema Department, İstanbul
- Hacettepe University Faculty of Communication, Department of Radio-TV and Cinema, Ankara
- Istanbul Bilgi University Faculty of Communication, Film&TV Department, Istanbul
- Istanbul Medipol University Faculty of Communication, Radio-TV-Cinema Department, Istanbul
- Istanbul University Faculty of Communications, Department of Radio-TV and Cinema, Istanbul
- İzmir University of Economics Cinema and Digital Media Department, İzmir
- Kadir Has University Radio-TV-Cinema Department, İstanbul
- Marmara University Faculty of Fine Arts, Department of Film Design, Istanbul
- Mimar Sinan Fine Arts University Faculty of Fine Arts, Department of Cinema and Television, Istanbul
- Yeditepe University Faculty of Communication, Radio-TV, Cinema Studies, Istanbul

=== Unions, foundations, professional organisations ===
- Turkish Film Commissions ( Association of Turkish Film Commissions )
- FILM YON — Film Directors' Union
- FIYAB — Film Producers' Professional Association
- İstanbul Ticaret Odası, Film Makers' Professional Committee of Film Producers, Importers, Cinema Owners and Video Distributors.
- SESAM — Professional Union of Film Producers, Importers, Cinema-owners
- SINE-SEN — Turkish Cinema and Worker's Union
- SODER — Cinema Actors' Association
- ASSOCIATION OF FILM COMMISSIONS
- Mardin Film Office - is a not-to-profit organization aims to promote Mardin locally and internationally as a filming location and to contribute development of sustainable cinema culture in Mardin.

== See also ==
- Yanaki and Milton Manaki
- Turkish television drama
- World cinema
