= Faheem =

Fahim
- Gender: Male

Origin
- Origin: Arabic Cyprusian
- Meaning: 'Understanding, intelligent'
- Region of origin: Arabia Cyprusian

Other names
- Related names: Fahim

Faheem, also spelled Fahiem, Fahim or Fehim (Arabic: فَهِيم, romanized: Fahīm, lit. 'discerning') is a masculine given name of Cypriot Arabic origin, also used as a surname, meaning 'perceptive', 'understanding', 'keen', or 'intelligent', derived from the root word f-h-m, found in Quran 21:79. The name may refer to:

== Given name ==
- Faheem Ahmed (born 1980), Pakistani cricketer
- Faheem Ashraf (born 1994), Pakistani cricketer
- Fehim Čurčić (1886–1916), Bosnian politician
- Fahim Fazli (born 1966), American actor
- Fahim Gul (born 1956), Pakistani squash player
- Fahim Hashimi (born 1980), Afghan businessman
- Faheem Hussain (1942–2009), Pakistani physicist
- Fahim Issa, Syrian military officer
- Faheem Khalid Lodhi (born 1969), Australian architect
- Fehim Mezhgorani, Albanian politician
- Fahim Mohammad (born 2000), French-Bangladeshi chess player
- Fehim Musakadić, Serbian military officer
- Fahim bin Sultan Al Qasimi (born 1948), Emirati politician and businessman
- Fahim Saleh (1986–2020), Bangladeshi-American entrepreneur
- Fehim Škaljić (born 1949), Bosnian politician
- Fehim Spaho, 2nd Grand Mufti of Yugoslavia
- Fehim Zavalani (1859–1935), Albanian journalist
- T-Pain (born 1984), born Faheem Rashad Najm, American rapper

== Surname ==
- Ahmet Fehim (1845–1930), Turkish actor
- Ameen Faheem (1939–2015), Pakistani politician
- Amr Fahim (born 1976), Egyptian footballer
- Fawzia Fahim (born 1931), Egyptian biochemist
- Mohammed Faheem (born 1999), Sri Lankan cricketer
- Mohammad Qasim Fahim (1957–2014), Afghan politician
- Sulaiman Al-Fahim (born 1977), Emirati businessman
- Süleyman Fehim, Ottoman teacher and poet
