= Perran =

Perran may refer to:

== People ==
- Saint Piran (died c. 480), Cornish abbot and saint, after which many places have been named Perran-
- Perran Moon (born 1970), British politician
- Perran Kutman (born 1949), a Turkish actress and comedian

== Places ==
- Perranwell railway station in Cornwall, England, originally named Perran
- Perranarworthal, a parish in Cornwall, England
  - Perran, a village in the parish
- Perranzabuloe, a hamlet and civil parish in Cornwall, England, and supposed place of death of the saint
- Saint-Péran, a commune in Brittany, France

== See also ==
- List of places in Cornwall
