= Postman (disambiguation) =

A postman is a mail carrier, a person delivering post.

Postman, The Postman, or Postmen may also refer to:

== People ==
- Postman (surname)
- Mick Price (snooker player) (born 1966), English snooker player nicknamed "The Postman"

== Art, entertainment, and media ==
=== Other arts and media ===
- Postman, a hypothetical or fictional adult male posthuman
- The Postman (1985), a post-apocalyptic novel by David Brin
- Postman (comics), a Marvel Comics character
- The Postman (Ninjago), a character in Ninjago

=== Films ===
- Il Postino, a 1994 Italian film known as The Postman in English
- Postman (1967 film), an Indian Malayalam film
- Postman (1984 film), a Turkish comedy film
- Postman (1995 film), a Chinese film
- Postman (2000 film), an Indian Telugu film
- The Postman, a 1971 Iranian film directed by Dariush Mehrjui
- The Postman (film), a 1997 film adaptation of David Brin's novel starring Kevin Costner

=== Music ===
- Postmen (band), a Dutch reggae/hip hop band
  - Postman, stage name of Remon Stotijn, former member of Postmen
  - Postman (album), a 2009 album by Postmen
- "The Postman", by The American Analog Set from their album Know by Heart (2001)
- "Postman", song by Living Colour from their album Stain (1993)
- "Postman", song by The Rasmus from their album Peep (1996)

== Other uses ==
- The postman or common postman Heliconius melpomene, a species of butterfly
- Postman (law), a senior barrister of the historic Exchequer of pleas of England and Wales
- Postman (software), an API platform for developers to design, build, and test their APIs

== See also ==
- Postman Pat, a British stop-motion TV series
- "Thank You Postman", a 2024 song by Ian Chan
