= Levent Kırca =

Turkish actor and comedian (1950–2015)

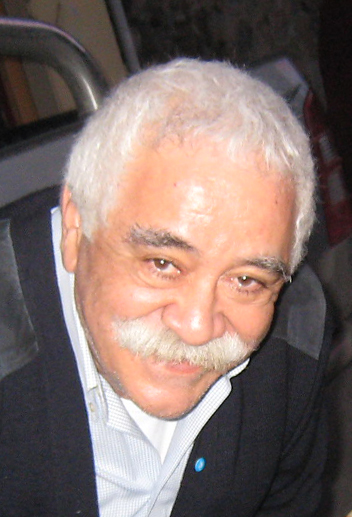
- Levent Kırca (2009)
- Born: Zeki Levent Kırca; September 28, 1950; Lâdik, Samsun, Turkey
- Died: October 12, 2015 (aged 65); Pendik, Istanbul, Turkey
- Resting place: Zincirlikuyu Cemetery, Istanbul
- Occupations: Comedian, stage and film actor, columnist, politician
- Political party: Patriotic Party (VP)
- Spouses: Nur Diner (m. 1975; div. 1985) Oya Başar (m. 1985; div. 2000) (m. 2001; div. 2005)
- Children: 4

Zeki Levent Kırca (September 28, 1950 – October 12, 2015) was a Turkish comedian, stage and film actor, columnist of the newspaper Aydınlık and politician of the left-wing Patriotic Party (Turkish: Vatan Partisi). He produced, wrote, directed, and acted in the 1986 sketch series Olacak O Kadar together with his wife for years. He played in the film Ne Olacak Şimdi? with veteran actors Şener Şen, Nevra Serezli, and Perran Kutman.

== Biography ==
Kırca was born in Samsun on September 28, 1950. Kırca was a faculty member at Beykent University, Faculty of Fine Arts. He was named a State Artist in 1998, following a suggestion put forward by the 55th government of Turkey, however, the title was taken back by the 62nd government. He died of liver cancer in Istanbul on October 12, 2015. Following the religious funeral service at Levent Mosque, he was interred in the Zincirlikuyu Cemetery.
