= Yaşam Kavgası =

- Directed by: Halit Refiğ
- Starring: Fatma Girik, Can Gürzap, and Ahmet Mekin
- Release date: 1978
- Country: Turkey
- Language: Turkish

Yaşam Kavgası is a 1978 Turkish drama film, directed by Halit Refiğ and starring Fatma Girik, Can Gürzap, and Ahmet Mekin.
