= Necla Nazır =

Turkish retired singer and actress (born 1956)

- Born: 16 April 1956 (age 69); Xanthi, Greece
- Occupation(s): Actress, singer
- Years active: 1973–2008
- Partner: Ferdi Tayfur (1976–2007)
- Children: 1

Necla Nazır (born 16 April 1956) is a Turkish retired singer and actress.

Nazır spent her childhood in Eyüpsultan and stopped her education after finishing middle school. While she was working in a factory, in 1972 she took part in an acting contest organized by Ses magazine and finished first. She started her career at the age of 16 and became one of the prominent actresses of the Cinema of Turkey. She later married fellow actor and singer Ferdi Tayfur, with whom she appeared in a number of movies. She also released an album through Tayfur's help. She retired from acting in 2008, after which she presented a Sancaktepe Sunni Islamic Menzil Community Naqshbandi TV Channel Semerkand TV few television programs. In 2018, she was honored with the Golden Orange Life Achievement Award.

== Filmography ==
- Hakkını Helal Et (2008) - TV series
- Sevgi Ana (2002) - TV series
- 155 Polis İmdat (1994) - TV series
- Kıvılcım (1993)
- Önce Kuşlar Öttü (1989)
- Ceylan (1989)
- O Bir Melekti (1987)
- Hayat Oyunu (Meral) (1987)
- Yarın Artık Bugündür (1987) - TV series
- Sevgili Bebeklerim (1987)
- Sen Ağlama (1987)
- Merdoğlu Ömer Bey (1986)
- İçimde Bir His Var (1986)
- Yıkılmışım Ben (1986)
- Gün Doğmadan (1986)
- Affet Allah'ım (1986)
- Her Şeyim Sensin (1985)
- Birkaç Güzel Gün İçin (1984)
- Ölmez Ağacı (1984)
- Çarıklı Milyoner (1983)
- Ve Recep ve Zehra ve Ayşe (1983)
- Çocuklar Çiçektir (1983)
- Bir Yudum Mutluluk (1982)
- Bir Damla Ateş (1981)
- Olmaz Olsun (1981)
- Ben Topraktan Bir Canım (1980)
- Adak (1980)
- Durdurun Dünyayı (1980)
- Yoksul (1979)
- Fadile (1979)
- İnsan Sevince (1979)
- Düzen (1978)
- Yadeller (1978)
- Batan Güneş (1978)
- Yara (1978)
- Ayağında Kundura (1978)
- Aldırma Gönül (1978)
- Küçük Ev (1977)
- Liseli Kızlar (1977)
- Kan (1977)
- Yangın (1977)
- Baskın (1977)
- Çeşme (1976)
- Bıktım Her Gün Ölmekten (1976)
- Kan Kardeşler (1976)
- Evlilik Şirketi (1976)
- Alev (1976)
- Bıktım Bu Hayattan (1976)
- Aman Karım Duymasın (1976)
- Merhaba (1976)
- Ateş Böceği (1975)
- Delisin (1975)
- Sınıfta Şenlik Var (1975)
- Köprü (1975)
- Çapkın Hırsız (1975)
- Garip Kuş (1974)
- Yatık Emine (1974)
- Gençlik Köprüsü (1974)
- Bir Ana Bir Kız (1974)
- Bir Yabancı (1974)
- Kızım Ayşe (1974)
- Bırakın Yaşayalım (1974)
- Umut Dünyası (1973)
- Istırap (Izdırap) (1973)
- Ben Doğarken Ölmüşüm (1973)

== Discography ==
Albums

- Sende… Uzadı Geceler (label: Ferdifon Müzik)
