= Fahim (film) =

2019 French film

- Directed by: Pierre-François Martin-Laval
- Written by: Pierre-François Martin-Laval; Thibault Vanhulle; Philippe Elno
- Based on: Un roi clandestin by: Fahim Mohammad; Xavier Parmentier; Sophie Le Callennec
- Produced by: Patrick Godeau
- Starring: Assad Ahmed; Gérard Depardieu; Isabelle Nanty
- Cinematography: Régis Blondeau
- Edited by: Reynald Bertrand
- Music by: Pascal Lengagne
- Production companies: Waiting For Cinema; Wild Bunch; Alicéléo; France 3 Cinéma; CN8 Productions; Delta Cinéma; Fruit d'Hommes Productions
- Distributed by: Wild Bunch Distribution
- Release dates: 23 August 2019 (Angoulême); 16 October 2019 (France)
- Running time: 107 minutes
- Country: France
- Languages: French; Bengali

Fahim is a 2019 French biographical comedy drama film directed by Pierre-François Martin-Laval. It is based on the autobiographical book by Fahim Mohammad, Xavier Parmentier and Sophie Le Callennec. The film stars Assad Ahmed, Gérard Depardieu, Mizanur Rahaman and Isabelle Nanty.

== Cast ==
- Assad Ahmed as Fahim Mohammad
- Gérard Depardieu as Sylvain Charpentier
- Isabelle Nanty as Mathilde
- Sarah Touffic Othman-Schmitt as Luna
- Victor Herroux as Louis
- Tiago Toubi as Max
- Alexandre Naud as Alex
- Pierre Gommé as Eliot
- Axel Keravec as Dufard
- Didier Flamand as Fressin
- Pierre-François Martin-Laval as Peroni
- Fahim Fazli as Jamil Kahn
- Sabrina Uddin as Mahamuda

== Release ==
It had its premiere at the Angoulême Francophone Film Festival on August 23, 2019. It was released in France by Wild Bunch Distribution on October 16, 2019.
