= İlker Ayrık =

Turkish actor

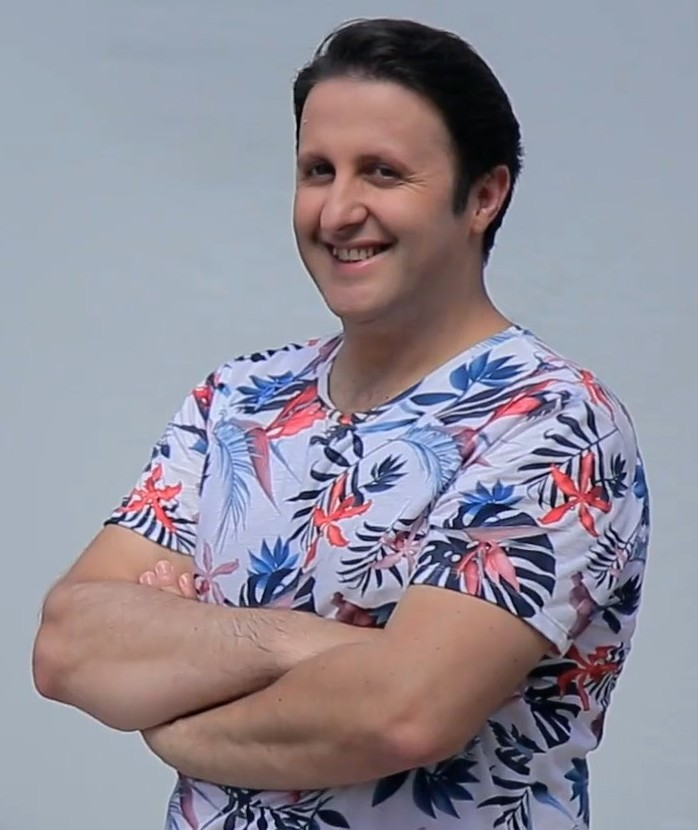
- Ayrık in 2016
- Born: 16 October 1979 (age 47); Balıkesir, Turkey
- Education: Müjdat Gezen Art Center
- Occupations: Actor, TV presenter, director
- Years active: 2000–present
- Spouse: Sanem Ayrık (m. 2009)
- Children: 2
- Awards: see list

İlker Ayrık (born 16 October 1979) is a Turkish actor, TV presenter, and director.

== Life and career ==
Ayrık was born on 16 October 1979 in Balıkesir. He stated that he dreamed of being an engineer when he was in high school, but after taking part in a theatre play at school, he gave up this dream and decided to become a stage actor. He graduated from Müjdat Gezen Art Center Conservatory's Theatre Department in 2003. After finishing school, he worked as Müjdat Gezen's assistant for 6 years. After graduating from school, Ayrık worked with MSM Oyuncuları, Müjdat Gezen Theatre, Tiyatro Ti, and Kent Oyuncuları before founding Pervasız Theatre with Aykut Taşkın in 2005.

In 2009, he played in Doa's "Yallah" music video alongside Ömür Arpacı and Aykut Taşkın. Between 2007 and 2009, he joined the Kent Oyuncuları where he was part of an adaptation of The Miser. In addition to his career on stage, Ayrık has appeared in many hit movies, TV series and advertisements since 2001. He acted alongside Kıvanç Tatlıtuğ several times in Akbank advertisements.

He is best known for her role as "Accountant Servet" in the Çakallarla Dans movie series. He played as stammering teacher in hit comedy series "Geniş Aile". He played the character of "Çağatay" in the period comedy series Seksenler, which was broadcast on TRT1 between 2012 and 2022. He played in the hit short comedy series "Ramazan Güzeldir".

He married his secondary school friend Sanem Ayrık in 2009, and they have 2 children named Ferit and Yaman from this marriage.

== Filmography ==
Film
Year	Title	Role	Notes
2002	Yılan Hikayesi	guy carrying tea maker	
2007	Son Osmanlı Yandım Ali	Yorgo	
2008	Çocuk	Oktay	
2008	Birthday Boy		Short film
2008	Gökten Üç Elma Düştü	Şoför Necmi	
2008	A.R.O.G	Tradesman	
2009	Mezuniyet	Osman	
2010	Memlekette Demokrasi Var	Uzatmalı Sıtkı	
2010	Çakallarla Dans	Muhasebeci Servet	Leading role
2012	Çakallarla Dans 2: Hastasıyız Dede	Muhasebeci Servet	Leading role
2012	Nashira Sıkıysa Yakala		
2012	Benim Annem Bir Dinazor		Voiceover
2013	Kedi Özledi	Kadir	Leading role
2014	Çakallarla Dans 3: Sıfır Sıkıntı	Muhasebeci Servet	Leading role
2015	Yapışık Kardeşler	Selim	Director, leading role
2015	Diktatör Adolf Hitler'in Hayatının Esrarengiz Yönleri		
2016	Çakallarla Dans 4	Muhasebeci Servet	Leading role
2017	Yanlış Anlama	Behçet	
2018	Çakallarla Dans 5	Muhasebeci Servet	Leading role
2022	Müstakbel Damat	Hasan	Producer, director, writer, leading role
2022	Çakallarla Dans 6	Muhasebeci Servet	Leading role
Television
Year	Title	Role	Notes
2001	Yılan Hikâyesi	guy carrying tea maker	
2001	Dadı	Hotel crew member	Episode 36
2001	Tatlı Hayat	Yavuz	Guest appearance
2002	Yedi Numara	Pickpocket	Episode 62
2002	Aslı ile Kerem	Cem	
2003	Kasabanın İncisi	Gökhan	
2004	Müjgân Bey	Tekin	
2004	Omuz Omuza	Tufan Türe	
2005	Kadın Her Zaman Haklıdır		
2005	Kısmet	Şenay	
2006	Gizli Patron		
2006	Karınca Yuvası	Mazlum	
2007	Başımın Belası	Cengiz	TV film
2007–2008	Kuzey Rüzgârı	Atilla	
2008	Babam Adam Olacak	Ayhan	
2008	Cesaretin Var mı Aşka?	Hüsnü	
2009	Haneler		Guest appearance
2009	Ramazan Güzeldir	Drummer	
2009–2011	Geniş Aile	Mürsel Koçak	Leading role
2012–2017, 2021–2022	Seksenler	Çağatay Özdemir	Leading role

== Theatre ==
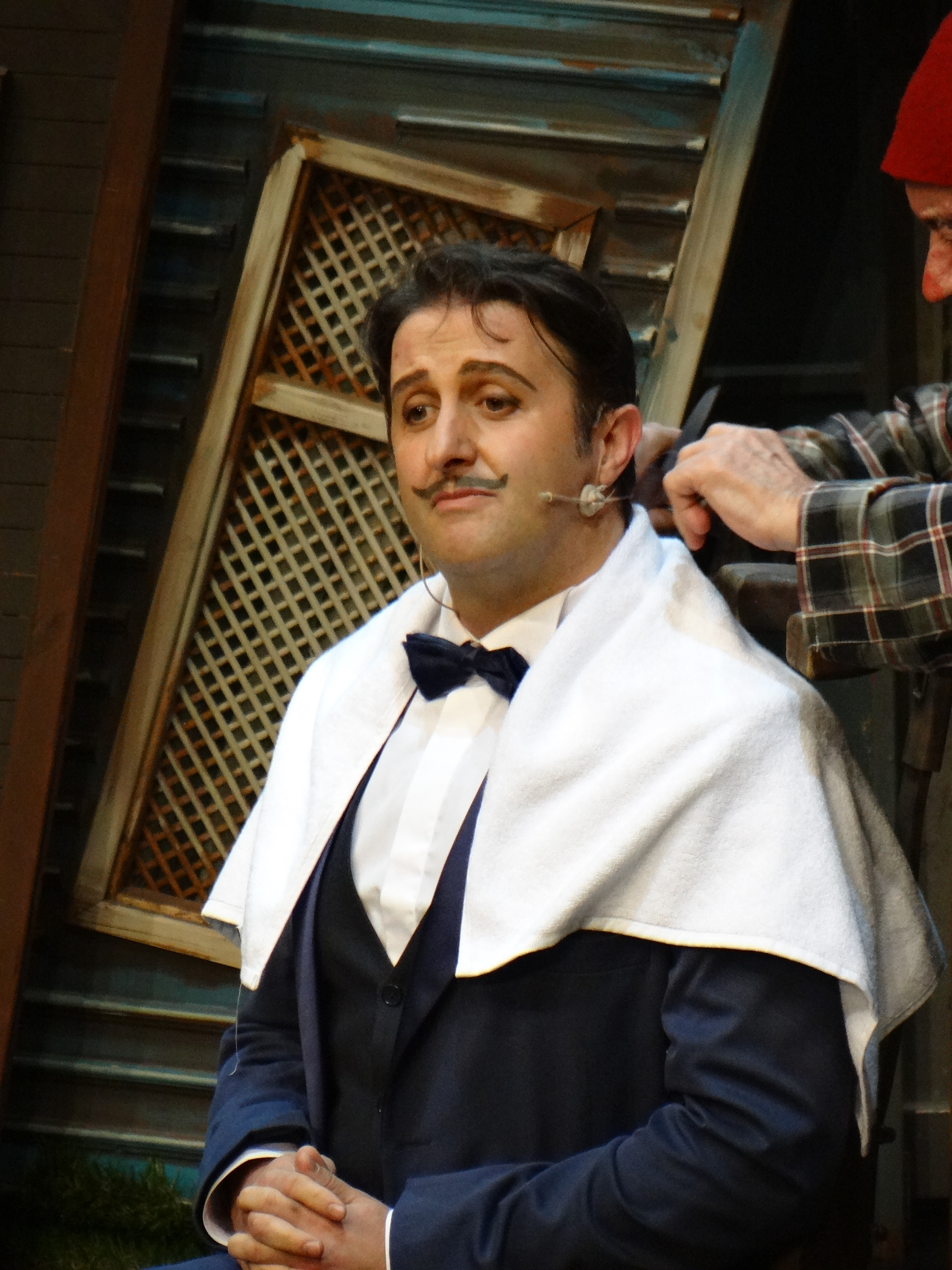
İlker Ayrık as the doctor in the play Yedi Kocalı Hürmüz (2017)

Year	Title	Role	Writer	Director	Venue
2000	The Wonderful Wizard of Oz		L. Frank Baum		MSM Oyuncuları
2000	The Cherry Orchard		Anton Chekhov		MSM Oyuncuları
2006	Uçurtmanın Kuyruğu		Savaş Dinçel		Pervasız Theatre
2008–2010	The Miser		Molière	Mehmet Birkiye	Kenter Theatre
2011	The Walworth Farce	Sean	Enda Walsh	Mehmet Birkiye	Tiyatro Gerçek
2012	Emigranci		Sławomir Mrożek	Sabahattin Mutluer	Pervasız Theatre
2016	Sevgi Müzikali		Kandemir Konduk	Müjdat Gezen	Müjdat Gezen Theatre
2017–2019	Yedi Kocalı Hürmüz	Doctor	Sadık Şendil	Müjdat Gezen	Müjdat Gezen Theatre
2017	Artiz Mektebi		Kandemir Konduk; Müjdat Gezen		Müjdat Gezen Theatre
2017	İlker Ayrık ve Acayip Tipler	narrator			Pervasız Theatre
2020	Keşanlı Ali Destanı	Keşanlı Ali	Haldun Taner	Yücel Erten	Pervasız Theatre

== Television programs ==
Year	Title	Network
2011	Extreme-G	
2012–2015	Ben Bilmem Eşim Bilir	Kanal D
2014	Çarkıfelek	Kanal D
2015–2016	İlker Ayrık İle 1-0	Kanal D
2016	Var Mısın Yok Musun	Star TV
2017	Saatli İlker Ayrık Takvimi	FOX
2018	Acayip Tipler	FOX
2018–2021	Yaparsın Aşkım	FOX
2021	İlker Ayrık'la Arazi Modu	YouTube (BaBaLa TV)
2021	İlker Ayrık'la Gerçekler Acıdır	YouTube (BaBaLa TV)
2022	Kazanan Restoran	FOX
2022	İlk Buluşma	FOX
2026	Çifte Milyon	NOW

== Awards and nominations ==
Year	Award	Category	Work	Result	Ref.
2011	[16th Sadri Alışık Theatre and Cinema Awards	Best Actor - Theatre/Comedy and Musical	Annem Yokken Çok Güleriz	Won	
2011	[16th Sadri Alışık Theatre and Cinema Awards	Best Supporting Actor - Motion Picture/Comedy Musical	Memlekette Demokrasi Var	Nominated	
2013	40th Golden Butterfly Awards	Best Male TV Presenter	Ben Bilmem Eşim Bilir	Won	
2013	40th Golden Butterfly Awards	Best Game Show	Ben Bilmem Eşim Bilir	Won	
2014	41st Golden Butterfly Awards	Best Male TV Presenter	Ben Bilmem Eşim Bilir	Won	
2015	42nd Golden Butterfly Awards	Best Game Show	Ben Bilmem Eşim Bilir	Nominated	
2015	42nd Golden Butterfly Awards	Best Male TV Presenter	Ben Bilmem Eşim Bilir	Won	
2015	2nd Mersin Palme d'Or Awards	Cinema of the Year Award		Won	
2016	Turkey Youth Awards	Best Showman	Ben Bilmem Eşim Bilir	Nominated	
2016	43rd Golden Butterfly Awards	Best Male TV Presenter	Var mısın Yok musun	Nominated	
2018	45th Golden Butterfly Awards	Best Male TV Presenter	Acayip Tipler; Yaparsın Aşkım	Nominated	
2019	46th Golden Butterfly Awards	Best Male TV Presenter	Yaparsın Aşkım	Nominated	
2020	Barrier-Free Life Foundation 10th Best of the Year Awards	Best Game Show	Yaparsın Aşkım	Won	
2020	Barrier-Free Life Foundation 10th Best of the Year Awards	Best Contest Presenter		Won	
2021	47th Golden Butterfly Awards	Best Actor in a Comedy Series	Seksenler	Nominated	
