= Kız Kolunda Damga Var =

Turkish comedy film

- Directed by: Halit Refiğ
- Starring: Fatma Girik, Sadri Alisik, and Sevda Nur
- Release date: 1967
- Country: Turkey
- Language: Turkish

Kız Kolunda Damga Var is a 1967 Turkish comedy film, directed by Halit Refiğ and starring Fatma Girik, Sadri Alisik, and Sevda Nur.
