= Treffendel =

Treffendel Trevendel (Breton)
- Commune
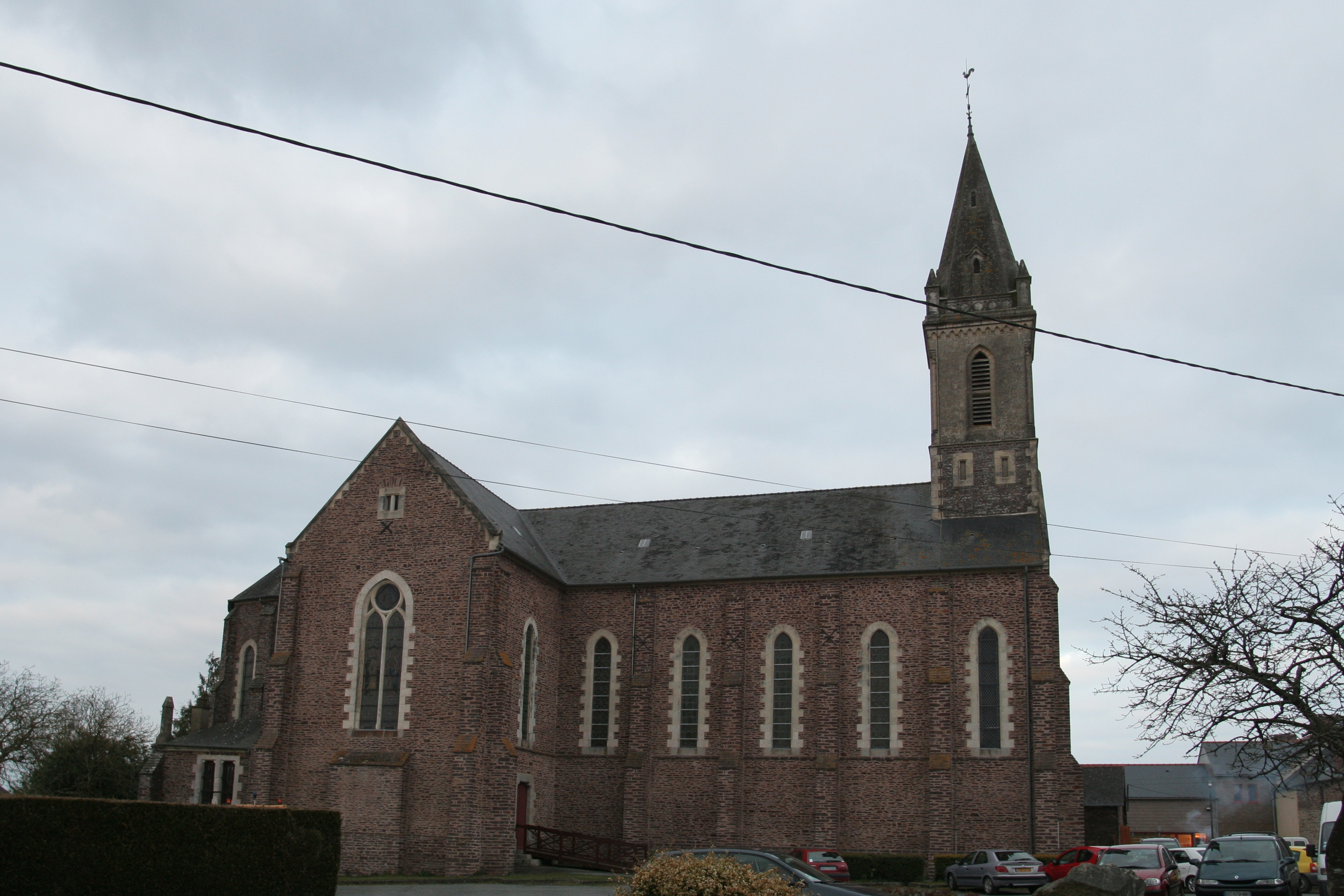
- The church in Treffendel
- Location of Treffendel
- Location within France Location within Brittany
- Coordinates: 48°02′27″N 2°00′15″W
- Country: France
- Region: Brittany
- Department: Ille-et-Vilaine
- Arrondissement: Rennes
- Canton: Montfort-sur-Meu
- Intercommunality: Brocéliande

Government
  - Mayor (2020–2026): Françoise Kerguélen
- Area^{1}: 18.98 km^{2} (7.33 sq mi)
- Highest elevation: 143 m (469 ft)
- Lowest elevation: 56 m (184 ft)
- Population (2023): 1,350
  - Density: 71.1/km^{2} (184/sq mi)
- Time zone: UTC+01:00 (CET)
  - Summer (DST): UTC+02:00 (CEST)
- INSEE/Postal code: 35340 /35380
- ^{1} French Land Register data, which excludes lakes, ponds, glaciers > 1 km^{2} (0.386 sq mi or 247 acres) and river estuaries.

Treffendel (French pronunciation: [tʁɛfɑ̃dɛl]; Breton: Trevendel) is a commune in the Ille-et-Vilaine department in Brittany in northwestern France.

== Population ==
Inhabitants of Treffendel are called Treffendelois in French.

Historical population
Year	Pop.	±% p.a.
1968	563	—
1975	577	+0.35%
1982	550	−0.68%
1990	623	+1.57%
1999	768	+2.35%
2007	1,242	+6.19%
2012	1,270	+0.45%
2017	1,257	−0.21%
2023	1,350	+1.20%
Source: INSEE

== See also ==
- Communes of the Ille-et-Vilaine department
