= Seviştiğimiz Günler =

- Directed by: Halit Refiğ
- Starring: Orhan Günsiray, Fatma Girik, and Nilüfer Aydan
- Release date: 1961
- Country: Turkey
- Language: Turkish

Seviştiğimiz Günler is a 1961 Turkish romantic drama film, directed by Halit Refiğ and starring Orhan Günsiray, Fatma Girik, and Nilüfer Aydan.
