= Postman (surname) =

Postman is a surname, and may refer to:

- Ian Postman (born 1982), South African cricketer
- Kenneth Postman (born 1955), South African cricketer
- Leo Postman (1918–2004), American psychologist
- Marc Postman (born 1958), American astronomer
- Neil Postman (1931–2003), American media theorist and cultural critic
