= Saint-Péran =

Saint-Péran Saent-Peran (Gallo) Sant-Pêran (Breton)
- Commune
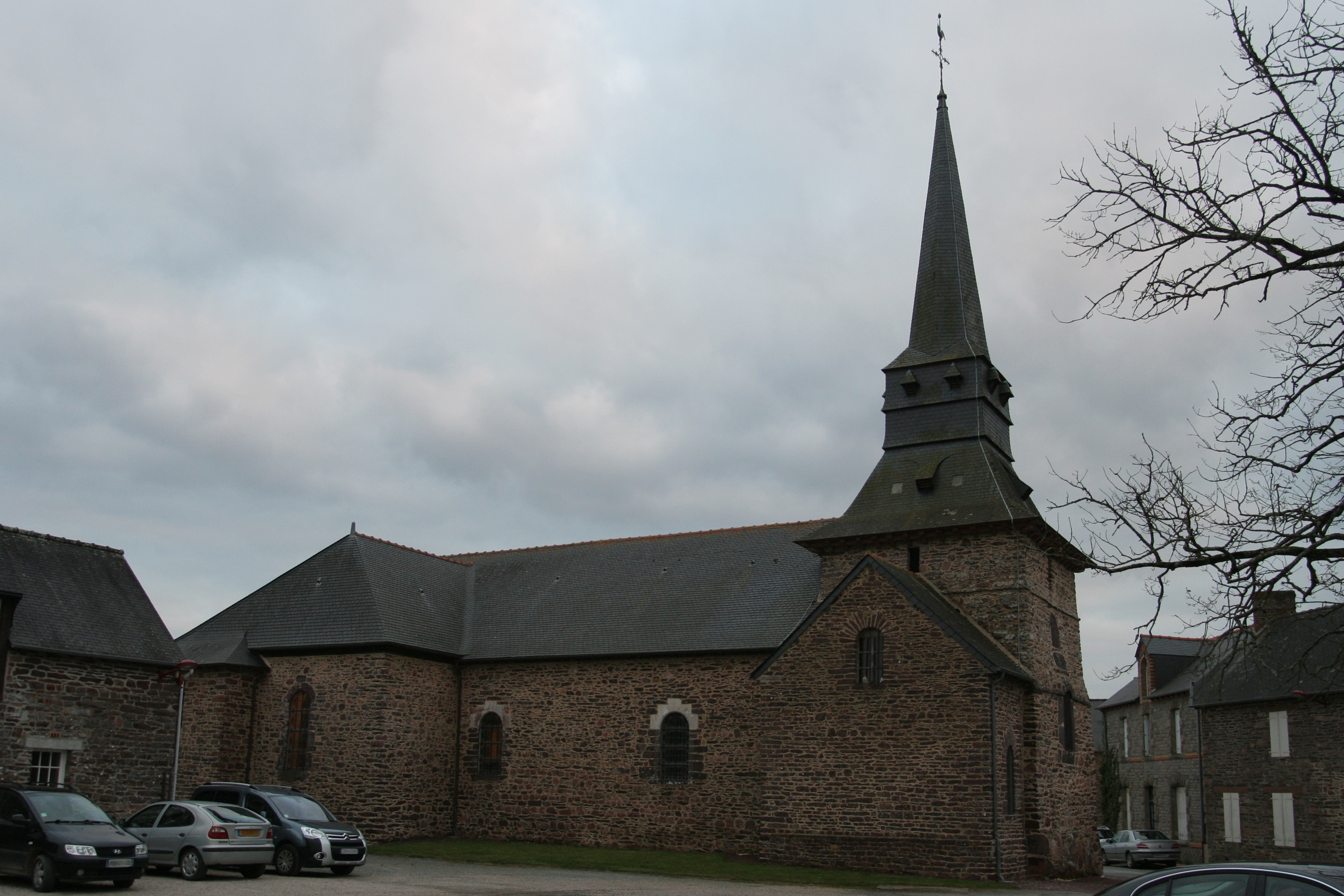
- The church of Saint-Péran
- Location of Saint-Péran
- Location within France Location within Brittany
- Coordinates: 48°03′19″N 2°03′18″W
- Country: France
- Region: Brittany
- Department: Ille-et-Vilaine
- Arrondissement: Rennes
- Canton: Montfort-sur-Meu
- Intercommunality: CC de Brocéliande

Government
  - Mayor (2020–2026): Isabelle Goven
- Area^{1}: 9.37 km^{2} (3.62 sq mi)
- Highest elevation: 160 m (520 ft)
- Lowest elevation: 84 m (276 ft)
- Population (2023): 407
  - Density: 43.4/km^{2} (113/sq mi)
- Time zone: UTC+01:00 (CET)
  - Summer (DST): UTC+02:00 (CEST)
- INSEE/Postal code: 35305 /35380
- ^{1} French Land Register data, which excludes lakes, ponds, glaciers > 1 km^{2} (0.386 sq mi or 247 acres) and river estuaries.

Saint-Péran (French pronunciation: [sɛ̃ peʁɑ̃]; Breton: Sant-Pêran; Gallo: Saent-Peran) is a commune in the Ille-et-Vilaine department in Brittany in northwestern France.

== Population ==
Inhabitants of Saint-Péran are called saint-péranais in French.

Historical population
Year	Pop.	±% p.a.
1968	209	—
1975	168	−3.07%
1982	160	−0.69%
1990	169	+0.69%
1999	196	+1.66%
2007	312	+5.98%
2012	369	+3.41%
2017	410	+2.13%
2023	407	−0.12%
Source: INSEE

== See also ==
- Communes of the Ille-et-Vilaine department
