= Metin Serezli =

Turkish actor and voice actor (1934–2013)

- Born: January 12, 1934; Istanbul, Turkey
- Died: March 10, 2013 (aged 79); Istanbul, Turkey
- Education: Istanbul University
- Occupations: Stage, movie, TV series and voice actor, theatre director
- Years active: 1958–2013
- Spouses: Nisa Serezli (m. 1957; div. 1966); Nevra Serezli (m. 1968)
- Children: 2

Metin Serezli (January 12, 1934 – March 10, 2013) was a Turkish stage, movie, TV series and voice actor as well as theatre director.

== Biography ==
Metin Serezli was born on January 12, 1934. He was educated in Istanbul University's Faculty of Law, Institute of Journalism at Faculty of Economics and Art History at Faculty of Letters.

His acting career began with amateur theatre performances at the theatre club of the university. In 1971, he established his own theatre, "Çevre Tiyatrosu".

In 1957, he married Nisa Serezli. The couple divorced in 1964. Serezli got into his second marriage on March 7, 1968, to Nevra Serezli, a theatre actress with whom he shared the stage many times. From this marriage they had two sons, Murat and Selim. Murat Serezli also became an actor.

== Death ==
Serezli died in the morning hours of March 10, 2013, at his home following lung cancer he had been suffering from for about two years. He was survived by his wife Nevra and the two sons. According to his wife, Serezli did not wish to have a memorial ceremony. He was buried at the Zincirlikuyu Cemetery following a religious funeral held at the Teşvikiye Mosque two days later.

== Awards ==
- Best Theatre Director Award (1969)

== Works ==
=== TV series ===
- Sihirli Annem (2011)
- Ay Işığı (2008)
- Palavra Aşklar (1995)
- Necip Fazıl Kısakürek (1988)
- Kavanozdaki Adam (1987)
- Olacak O Kadar (1986)

=== TV movies ===
- Yüzleşme (1996)
- Çılgin Sonbahar (1995)
- Beşten Yediye (1994)
- Özgürlüğün Bedeli (1977)

=== Movies ===
- Son (2001)
- Darbe (1990)
- Nefret (1984)
- Metres (1983)
- Gecelerin Kadını (1983)
- Sarışın Tehlike (1980)
- Zübük (1980)
- Talihli Amele (1980)
- Ceza (1974)
- Beddua / Günahsız Kadın (1973)
- Sisli Hatıralar Atıf (1972)
- Gümüş Gerdanlık Kemal (1972)
- Kopuk (1972)
- Falcı Kenan (1972)
- Unutulan Kadın (1971)
- Senede Bir Gün (1971)
- Son Hıçkırık (1971)
- Bütün Anneler Melektir (1971)
- Melek mi Şeytan mı? / Asrın Kadını (1971)
- On Küçük Şeytan (1971)
- Aşk Uğruna (1971)
- Hayat Sevince Güzel (1971)
- Sürgünden Geliyorum (1971)
- Ömrümce Unutamadım- Ömrümce Aradım (1971)
- Ayşecik ve Sihirli Cüceler Rüyalar Ülkesinde (1971)
- Ayşecik Sana Tapıyorum (1970)
- Yavrum (1970)
- Seven Ne Yapmaz (1970)
- Şoför Nebahat (1970)
- Dağlar Kızı Reyhan (1969)
- Yaralı Kalp (1969)
- Ayşecik'le Ömercik (1969)
- Kuduz Recep (1967)
- Damgalı Kadın (1966)
- Bozuk Düzen (1965)
- Güzel Bir Gün İçin (1965)
- Sensiz Yıllar (1960)
- Ayşe'nin Çilesi (1958)
- Son Saadet (1958)

=== Dubbing ===
- Sihirli Annem (2003-2006)
- Tatar Ranmazan Sürgünde (1992)
- Hanımın Çiftliği (1990)
- Kan Çiöeği (1989)
- Tutsak (1987)
- Bir Günah Gibi (1987)
- Savunma (1986)
- Hayat Köprüsü (1986)
- Arzu (1985)
- Çaresizim (1984)
- Lodos Zühtü (1984)
- Atla Gell Şaban (1984)
- En Büyük Yumruk (1983)
- Kelepçe (1982)
- Arkadaşım (1982)
- Şabancık (1981)
- Herhangibir Kdın (1981)
- Gırgıriyede Şenlik Var (1981)
- Gerzek Şaban (1980)
- İstanbul 1979 (1979)
- Kanun Gücü (1979)
- Bekçiler Kralı (1979)
- Şahit (1978)
- İnsanları Seveceksin (1978)
- Dost Bildiklerim (1978)
- Derdim Dünyadan Büyük (1978)
- Cafer'in Çilesi (1978)
- İstasyon (1977)
- Çırılçıplak (1977)
- Liseli Kızlar (977)
- Hatasız Kul Olmaz (1977)
- Güneşli Bataklık (1977)
- Cemil Dönüyor (1977)
- Baba Ocağı (1977)
- Adalet (1977)
- Şoför (1976)
- Çağrı (1976)
- Silahlara Veda (1976)
- Mağlup Edilmeyenler (1976)
- Kolombo Şakir (1976)
- Hınç (1976)
- Evlatlık / Çıngar (1976)
- Darbe (1976)
- Baş Belası (1976)
- Zımbala Behçet / Behçet 76 (1975)
- Biraraya Gelemeyiz (1975)
- Önce Sevi Sonra Öldür (1971)
- Önce Sevi Sonra Vur (1971)
- Umutsuzlar (1971)
