= Fahim Mohammad =

French-Bangladeshi chess player

Personal information
- Born: July 26, 2000 (age 25) Dhaka, Bangladesh

Chess career
- Country: Bangladesh (until 2012); France (since 2012)
- Title: FIDE Master (2017)
- Peak rating: 2383 (May 2018)

Fahim Mohammad (born 26 July 2000) is a French-Bangladeshi chess player. He is a FIDE master since 2017. His highest rating was 2383 (in June 2018).

== Personal life ==
He was born in Dhaka, Bangladesh in 2000 and moved to France in 2008 with his father. The family sought political asylum, which was initially rejected by the French authorities. Meanwhile, Fahim had started playing chess at the chess club in Créteil. In 2012, he became national chess champion in the under-12 category. He continued to excel in chess, and by 2016, his Elo rating had risen to 2276, placing him among the top 150 players in the world in the under-16 category.

== Popular culture ==
Fahim's life story was told in a 2014 book by Sophie Le Callennec and Xavier Parmentier. The book has been translated in multiple languages, including in English under the title A King in Hiding. The book has also been turned into a film called Fahim. Directed by Pierre-François Martin-Laval and starring Gerard Depardieu, the movie is released in 2019.
