= Postman (1984 film) =

- Postacı
- Directed by: Memduh Ün
- Written by: Umur Bugay
- Produced by: Memduh Ün
- Starring: Kemal Sunal; Fatma Girik
- Music by: Cahit Berkay
- Production company: Uğur Film
- Release date: 1984
- Running time: 83 minutes
- Country: Turkey
- Language: Turkish

Postman is a 1984 Turkish comedy film directed by Memduh Ün. In the movie Kemal Sunal and Fatma Girik shared the lead roles.

== Plot ==
Adem works as a postman in one of the suburbs of Istanbul and lives in an old house with his elderly mother. He wants to marry a girl named Sevtap. However, Sevtap's older brother Latif opposes this marriage. Latif, who has been working abroad for many years, is accustomed to a certain level of German culture, but still adheres to old traditions. In order to get married, Sevtap informs her brother and asks for permission. However, the reply by telegram is negative. A cunning thing comes to Adem's mind and tells Sevtap to read the telegram differently to her father. Thereupon, he informs his father that his brother gave permission. Thus, they begin the preparations for the wedding. But unexpectedly, his older brother Latif takes leave in Turkey and the lie is revealed. After that, everything gets mixed up.
