= Oya Başar =

Turkish actress (born 1956)

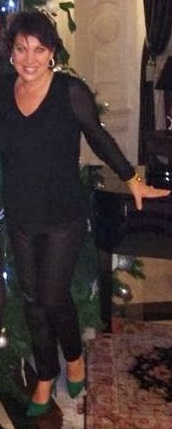
- Born: 11 February 1956 (age 70); Istanbul, Turkey
- Occupations: Actress, comedian
- Years active: 1964–present
- Spouses: Levent Kırca (m. 1985; div. 2000): (m. 2001; div. 2005)
- Children: 2

Oya Başar (born 11 February 1956) is a Turkish actress.

== Early life and career ==
At the age of 8, Başar joined the Istanbul City Theatres. After finishing her education in Istanbul, she took part in various plays. She then worked for Devekuşu Cabaret, Istanbul Theatre and Ali Poyrazoğlu Theatre. She then made her television debut, before meeting Levent Kırca and founding a theatre company with him. Her breakthrough came with the 1986 sketch series Olacak O Kadar, which she produced, directed, and acted in together with her husband for years. She played in popular comedy series "Benim Annem Bir Melek" alongside Tarık Ünlüoğlu who her ex-bride's father. In 2007, she was diagnosed with breast cancer and took a break from acting but later recovered. She then joined Şehir Theatres and appeared in the Yedi Kocalı Hürmüz musical. Başar continues her career in cinema and television.

== Personal life ==
Her maternal family is of Kurdish origin. After Ottoman Empire collapsed, her paternal family is of Turkish origin who immigrated from Thessaloniki. Başar married actor Levent Kırca in 1985. Together they had two children, Umut Kırca and Ayşe Kırca. The couple divorced in 2000, but remarried in 2001 before divorcing again in 2005. Levent Kırca died in 2015.

Başar does not use social media and has stated that she doesn't take what is written on these media into consideration.

== Filmography ==
Film
Year	Title	Role	Notes
1966	Oduncunun Çocukları	Nurse	
1974	Canavar Cafer	Journalist	
1976	Analar Ölmez	Teacher	
1976	Bitmeyen Şarkı	Nebahat	
1976	Bulunmaz Uşak		
1976	Kaybolan Saadet	Sevim	
1976	Lüküs Hayat	Servant	
1976	Mahallede Şenlik Var		
1976	Zühtü (I)	Döndü	
1977	Kördüğüm	Emine	
1977	Ne Zaman Geleceksin		
1977	Sen ve Ben		
1977	Vahşi Sevgili	Fadime's sister	
1978	Neşeli Günler		Voice over
1979	Çilekeş	Suna	
1982	Berduşlar	Nesrin	
1982	Gözüm Gibi Sevdim	Ayşe	
2001	Son	Necla Fidan	
2002	Şeytan Bunun Neresinde		
2015	Yusuf Yusuf	Kadriye	
2016	El Değmemiş Aşk		
Television
Year	Title	Role	Notes
1974	Sokak Şarkıcıları		
1986–2005	Olacak O Kadar	Nebalet	
2002	Ah Yaşamak Var Ya!	Hatun	
2004	Kendini Bırak Gitsin		
2006	Sev Kardeşim	Meryem	Supporting role
2008–2010	Benim Annem Bir Melek	Neriman Turuncu	Leading role
2011–2013	Alemin Kıralı	Asalet	Leading role
2014–2015	Roman Havası	Zarife Hoyrat	Leading role
2015–2017	O Hayat Benim	Sultan	Supporting role
2018	Meleklerin Aşkı	Rukiye İnançlı Efe	Leading role
2022	Çok Güzel Hareketler 2	Herself	guest presenter
2023	Yaz Şarkısı	Emine Yıldırım	Supporting role

== Theatre ==
- Kadın ile Memur - BKM
- Yedi Kocalı Hürmüz - Istanbul City Theatre
- Üç Baba Hasan - Oya Başar Levent Kırca Theatre
- Seferi Ramazan Beyin Nafile Dünyası - Oya Başar Levent Kırca Theatre
- Gereği Düşünüldü - Oya Başar Levent Kırca Theatre
- Morfin - Ali Poyrazoğlu Theatre
- Haneler - Devekuşu Cabaret
