= Fahim Fazli =

Afghan-born American film actor

- Born: May 30, 1966 (age 60); Kabul, Afghanistan
- Occupations: Actor, author
- Years active: 2004–present

Fahim Fazli (Pashto, Dari: فهیم فاضلی; born May 30, 1966) is an Afghan American actor and author.

== Biography ==
Fazli was born into a Pashtun family in Kabul, Afghanistan. He left Afghanistan and settled in California, United States in the 1980s due to the Soviet-Afghan War.

He returned to Afghanistan as an interpreter and as a cultural advisor during tours with the U.S. Marines in 2009 and 2010. After returning, he wrote a memoir, Fahim Speaks that was released in early 2012.

== Filmography ==
=== Film ===
Key
†	Denotes films that have not yet been released.

Year	Title	Role	Notes
1999	Three Kings	Refugee	
2007	Charlie Wilson’s War	Villager	
2008	Iron Man	Omar	
2008	Eagle Eye	Al Kohei	
2009	Red Sands	Goat herder	
2009	Hired Gun	Abdul-Aziz	
2009	Welcome to A'Stan	Jamalia	
2009	Anti-Narcotics	Jalali	
2009	G.I. Joe: The Rise of Cobra	Camel handler	Uncredited
2009	After Action Review	Jamalia	
2011	We Will Rock You	Shopkeeper	Uncredited
2012	Argo	Komiteh subordinate	
2012	Big Bad Bugs	Enemy soldier	
2013	Blood Shot	Terrorist #2	
2014	Fort Bliss	Afghan driver	
2014	American Sniper	Messianic tribal leader	
2015	Aloha	Afghan tribesman	
2015	Rock the Kasbah	Tariq	
2018	12 Strong	Khaled	
2018	American Warfighter	Bear V.O.	
2018	Saint Judy	Taliban leader	
2019	Fahim	Jamil Kahn	
2019	The Outpost	Taliban fighter	Uncredited
2020	I Am Fear	Rashid	
2023	Ghosted	Mosque Hammam	
2025	Thunderbolts*	Agent Wild	
2025	Superman	Jarhanpurian Villager	

=== Television ===
Year	Title	Role	Notes
2004	Homeland Security	Karzai Bodyguard	Television film
2004	NYPD 2069	Voices	Television film
2006	The Path to 9/11	Voices	Television film
2006	A.K.A.	Chef	Television film
2008	The Unit	Auctioneer	Episode: "Shadow Riders"
2011	Outsourced	Inmate #1	Episode: "Guess Who's Coming to Delhi"
2011	Deadliest Warrior	Saddam Hussein	Episode: "Saddam Hussein vs. Pol Pot"
2011	Louie	Afghan local	Episode: "Duckling"
2012	NCIS: Los Angeles	Iranian soldier	Episode: "Descent"
2015	Jimmy Kimmel Live!	Uber driver	Episode: "Mila Kunis/Bob Odenkirk/Charli XCX"
2015	The Brink	Warlord	2 episodes
2015	Homeland	Video Jihadist	Episode: "Separation Anxiety"
2019	Barry	Afghan villager	3 episodes
2020	68 Whiskey	Warlord	3 episodes
2026	Nurse the Dead	Mr. Hamid	

=== Video games ===
Year	Title	Role	Notes
2012	Call of Duty: Black Ops II	Additional voices	
