= Japon İşi =

- Directed by: Kartal Tibet
- Produced by: Yahya Kılıç
- Starring: Kemal Sunal; Sümer Tilmaç; Necdet Yakın; Reha Yurdakul; Fatma Girik; Asuman Arsan
- Music by: Cahit Berkay
- Release date: 1987
- Country: Turkey
- Language: Turkish

Japon İşi is a 1987 Turkish science fiction-comedy film, directed by Kartal Tibet and written by Erdoğan Tünaş, starring Kemal Sunal.

== Plot ==
Veysel loves a singer named Başak but she doesn't love him back. One day Veysel saves the life of a Japanese tourist. Later, back in Japan, the latter sends to Veysel a gift: it is a robot, which looks identical to Veysel's crush Başak.

== Selected cast ==
- Kemal Sunal as Veysel
- Fatma Girik as Başak & Japanese Robot
- Sümer Tilmaç as Dilaver
