= Zübük =

1981 Turkish comedy film

- Directed by: Kartal Tibet
- Written by: Aziz Nesin
- Produced by: Türker İnanoğlu
- Starring: Kemal Sunal; Nevra Serezli; Metin Serezli
- Music by: Esin Engin
- Distributed by: Erler Film
- Release date: 13 June 1981
- Running time: 89 minutes
- Country: Turkey
- Language: Turkish

Zübük (lit. stupid) is a 1980 Turkish comedy film directed by Kartal Tibet. The character was created by humorist Aziz Nesin.

== Cast ==
- Kemal Sunal - İprahim Zübükzade / Zeybekzade Kara Yusuf Efe
- Nevra Serezli - Yektane
- Kadir Savun - The Father of Yektane, the Oppositionist Kadir Efendi
- Osman Alyanak - Motelci Satılmış
- Ali Şen - Sabri Ağa
- Bülent Kayabaş - İri Nuri
- Metin Serezli - Journalist Yaşar
- Memduh Ün - Deputy
- Nubar Terziyan - Bedri Hodja
- Bilge Zobu - Governor Vahit Atılgan
- Osman F. Seden - Speaker of the Assembly
