= Perran Kutman =

Turkish actress (born 1949)

- Born: Perran Kanat; 30 November 1949 (age 76); Istanbul, Turkey
- Years active: 1967–present
- Spouses: Hüseyin Kutman (m. 1973; div. 1978) Koral Sarıtaş (m. 1980)

Perran Kutman (born Perran Kanat on 30 November 1949) is a Turkish actress who usually appears in comedic roles.

== Career ==
She went to the Istanbul Municipal Conservatory and started her professional acting career in 1967 at the Ulvi Uraz Theatre. She participated in several plays such as with Nisa Serezli in 1969, Sezer Sezin in 1973, Miyatro in 1980 until her final play Artiz Mektebi in 1987.

Kutman became interested in the film industry or 'Yeşilçam' as it was widely known at the time, and made her film debut in 1971 opposite Müjdat Gezen in Kaynanam Tatilde. She then appeared in a number of successful films, including Köyden İndim Şehire, Salak Milyoner, Hababam Sınıfı and Gırgıriye.

She starred in the comedy series Perihan Abla (Sister Perihan), one of the most watched shows in the history of Turkish television. Kutman had major successes in other series like Kızlar Yurdu, Şehnaz Tango, Bir Kadın Bir Erkek, Üzgünüm Leyla and Hayat Bilgisi

== Personal life ==
She was married to actor Hüseyin Kutman whose surname she took. After they divorced, she married the musician Koral Sarıtaş.
