= Ahmet Fehim =

Turkish actor and film director

- Born: 1856
- Occupation: Actor

Ahmet Fehim (1856, in Istanbul – 2 August 1930, in Istanbul) was an actor who worked in the Ottoman Empire and later in Turkey.

== Filmography ==
=== Film ===
Year	Title	Note
1919	Binnaz	
1919	Mürebbiye	
1916	Himmet Aga'nin Izdivaci	
1919	Binnaz	
1919	Mürebbiye	
1919	Mürebbiye	
