= Fatma Girik =

Turkish actress and politician (1942–2022)

- Born: 12 December 1942; Istanbul, Turkey
- Died: 24 January 2022 (aged 79); Istanbul, Turkey
- Education: Istanbul Girls High School
- Occupations: Actress, politician
- Years active: 1954–2022
- Political party: Social Democratic Populist Party
- Partner: Memduh Ün
- Children: 1 (adopted)

Fatma Girik (12 December 1942 – 24 January 2022) was a Turkish actress and politician. She was an icon for the golden age in Turkish cinematography and is regarded as one of the four most important actresses in Turkish cinema.

== Biography ==
Girik was born in Istanbul on 12 December 1942. She graduated from Cağaloğlu Girls High School in the city. Her first appearance in front of the camera was as a walking lady in Günahkar Baba (Sinful Father) by Arşavir Alyanak.

With Cüneyt Arkın, she played in Sevişmek Yasak, Kolsuz Kahraman, Köroğlu, Vatan ve Namık Kemal, Büyük Yemin, Satın Alınan Koca, Murat ile Nazlı, Gönülden yaralılar, Önce Vatan, Gelincik.

After a stint in small parts, she landed the leading role in Leke (The Stain) by Seyfi Havaeri in 1958. Three years later, she became a respected movie star with her leading role in Ölüm Peşimizde (Death is Chasing Us) by Memduh Ün. She went on to star in over 180 films. Later on, she ventured into politics, becoming the mayor of the district of Şişli in Istanbul between 1989 and 1994.

Girik died in Istanbul from multi-organ failure due to pneumonia caused by COVID-19 on 24 January 2022, at the age of 79.

== Filmography ==
=== Film ===
Year	Title	Role	Nots
1955	Günahkar Baba	Walking Lady	
1956	Sazlı Damın Kahpesi	Konsomatris	
1956	Yetimler Ahı	Watcher of Güreş	
1957	Kurt Mustafa	Ayşe's friend	
1957	Bir Serseri		
1957	Memiş İş başında		
1957	Leke: Öksüz Yavru		
1958	Murada Ereceğiz	Nazlı	
1958	İstiklal Uğrunda		
1958	Memiş Gangsterler Arasında		
1958	Gönülden Ağlayanlar		
1959	Seher Yıldızı	Seher	
1959	Günah Bende		
1959	Talihsizler	Zeynep	
1959	Sevdalı Gelin		
1959	Ömrümün Tek Gecesi		
1959	Eceline Susamışlar		
1959	Çakır Emine'm		
1959	Bağrıyanık		
1960	Vatan ve Namus	Perihan	
1960	Üsküdar İskelesi	Leyla	
1960	Telli Kurşun		
1960	Ölüm Peşimizde	Zehra	
1960	Kaldırım Çocuğu Kopuk		
1960	Fakir Şarkıcı		
1960	Civanmert	Nuran	
1960	Cici Kâtibem	Ruhsar	
1960	Aşk Hırsızı		
1960	Aliii	Fatma	
1960	Çapkın Hırsız		
1961	Seviştiğimiz Günler	Lale	
1961	İki Damla Gözyaşı		
1961	Duvaksız Gelin		
1961	Boş Yuva		
1961	Avare Mustafa	Aynur	
1961	Mahalleye Gelen Gelin	Belgin Arsev	
1962	Sokak Kızı	Fıstık	
1962	Küçük Beyefendi	Türkân	
1962	Kısmetin En Güzeli	Fatma	
1962	Günahsız Aşıklar		
1962	Fosforlu Oyuna Gelmez		
1962	Fatoş'un Bebekleri	Fatoş	
1962	Erkeklik Öldü Mü Atıf Bey?	Fatma	
1962	Çöpçatan	Leyla	
1962	Belalı Torun	Kâmuran, Canan	
1962	Cengiz Han'ın Hazineleri	Çavdar Tarlası	
1963	Zoraki Milyoner		Guest star
1963	Zifaf Gecesi		
1963	Yavaş Gel Güzelim	Fatoş Efeler	
1963	Yaralı Aslan	Leyla	
1963	Katır Tırnağı		
1963	Hop dedik	Leyla Seven	
1963	Bulunmaz Uşak	Fatma	
1963	Bir Hizmetçi Kızın Hatıra Defteri	Zeynep Çileli, Kent	
1963	Bire On Vardı		
1963	Bazıları Dayak Sever	Fatoş	
1963	Barut Fıçısı	Fatma	
1963	Badem Şekeri	Nilüfer Tütüneken	
1963	Kiralık Koca		
1964	Tophaneli Osman	Hizmetçi Fatma	
1964	Tatlı Sert		
1964	Öpüşmek Yasak	Oya Selamet	
1964	Öp Annenin Elini	Aynur Akay	
1964	Muhteşem Serseri	Sahte Prenses Zuhal	
1964	Köye Giden Gelin		
1964	Koçum Benim		
1964	Kırk Küçük Anne	Fatoş, Fatma	
1964	Kimse Fatma Gibi Öpemez	Fatma Erdinç	
1964	Keşanlı Ali Destanı	Zeliha, Zilha, Nevvare	
1964	Halk Çocuğu	Suna, Fatoş	
1964	Galatalı Fatma	Galatalı Fatma	
1964	Fatoş'un Fendi Tayfur'u Yendi	Fatoş	
1964	Beş Şeker Kız	Şükran Deniz	
1964	Varan Bir		
1964	Hizmetçi Dediğin Böyle Olur		
1964	Kanun Karşısında		
1965	Yıldız Tepe	Sevgi	
1965	Üç Kardeşe Bir Gelin	Fatoş	
1965	Sevişmek Yasak		
1965	Severek Ölenler (Kartalların Öcü)	Güner	
1965	Seveceksen Yiğit Sev		
1965	Şenol Birol Gool		
1965	Şeker Hafiye	Fatma Aksoy	
1965	Şeker Gibi Kızlar	Belgin Işıl, Hülya	
1965	Kumarbaz		
1965	Korkunç İntikam		
1965	Hırsız	Selma Türker, Güner	
1966	Bir Garip Adam		
1966	Altın Şehir		
1966	Yiğitler Ölmezmiş		
1966	Seni Bekleyeceğim		
1966	Ölüm Temizler		
1966	Kucaktan Kucağa	Selma	
1966	Kolsuz Kahraman	Bela Çiçeği	
1966	Karakolda Ayna Var	Ferhunde Demirçiçek, Mualla	
1966	Koca Yusuf		
1966	Hedef Ankara		
1966	Fakir Çocuklar		
1966	Fabrikanın Şoförü		
1966	Ben Bir Sokak Kadınıyım	Funda	
1966	Bana Bela Derler		
1966	Avare Kız		
1966	Aşkın Kanunu		
1966	Allahaısmarladık Yavrum		
1966	Namusum İçin		
1967	Zilli Nazife	Nazife	
1967	Ya Sev Ya Öldür	Feride	
1967	Yaprak Dökümü	Leyla	
1967	Son Gece	Maria	
1967	Ömre Bedel Kız		
1967	Kız Kolunda Damga Var		
1967	Kiralık Kadın		
1967	Karakolda Ayna Var		
1967	Hırsız Prenses		
1967	Dolmuş Şoförü		
1967	Ayşecik (Canım Annem)		
1967	Ağa Düşen Kadın		
1967	Sürtüğün Kızı		
1968	Vuruldum Bir Kıza		
1968	Öksüz		
1968	Nilgün	Nilgün	
1968	Köroğlu	Hüsnübala	
1968	Ezo Gelin	Ezo Gelin	
1968	Çöl Kartalı Şeyh Ahmet		
1968	Ana Hakkı Ödenmez		
1969	Vatan ve Namık Kemal	Zekiye	
1969	Menekşe Gözler	Serap	
1969	Erkek Fatma	Fatma	
1969	Büyük Yemin	Iraz	
1969	Boş Beşik	Fatma	
1970	Şoför Nebahat		
1970	Meçhul Kadın	Nermin	
1970	Ham Meyva		
1970	Duyduk Duymayın Demeyin		
1970	Yarın Son Gündür		
1971	Solan Bir Yaprak Gibi		
1971	Satın Alınan Koca		
1971	Önce Sev Sonra Öldür		
1971	Mualla		
1971	Mahşere Kadar	Fatma	
1971	Kerem ile Aslı	Aslı	
1971	İki Ruhlu Kadın	Selma	
1971	Acı	Zeliha	
1971	1972	Namus	Zeynep
1971	1972	Murat ile Nazlı	Nazlı
Evlat	1972		
1973	Toprak Ana		
1973	Kızgın Toprak		
1973	Kambur	Azize	
1973	Gönülden Yaralılar	Zeynep	
1973	Dağdan İnme	Elif	
1974	Önce Vatan		
1974	Kuma	Hanım	
1974	Kara Peçe	Fatoş	
1975	Ağrı Dağı Efsanesi	Gülbahar	
1977	Ölmeyen Şarkı		
1977	Meryem ve Oğulları	Meryem	
1977	Hatasız Kul Olmaz		
1977	İntikam Meleği (Kadın Hamlet)	Hamlet	
1978	Yaşam Kavgası	Emine	
1978	Gelincik		
1981	Kanlı Nigar	Kanlı Nigar	
1982	Kaçak	Fatma	
1982	Gülsüm Ana		
1984	Postacı	Sevtap	
1984	Nefret		
1985	Yılanların Öcü	Irazca	
1987	Japon İşi	Başak Billurses	
2005	Büyülü Fener		
2005	Sinema Bir Mucizedir		

=== TV series ===
Year	Title	Role	Nots
2000	Benim İçin Ağlama		
2001	Bize Ne Oldu		
2003	Gurbet Kadını	Zeyno Ana	
2005	Sinema Bir Mucizedir / Büyülü Fener		
2006	Hasret		
2007	Oğlum İçin		
2009	Altın Kızlar		
2012	Babalar ve Evlatlar		

== Awards ==
- 2nd Antalya Golden Orange Film Festival 1965, Keşanlı Ali Destanı, Best Actress
- 4th Antalya Golden Orange Film Festival 1967, Sürtüğün Kızı, Best Actress
- 1st Adana Golden Boll Film Festival 1969, Ezo Gelin, Best Actress
- 2nd Adana Golden Boll Film Festival 1970, Boş Beşik, Best Actress
- 3rd Adana Golden Boll Film Festival 1971, Acı, Best Actress
- 35th Antalya Golden Orange Film Festival 1998, Sürtüğün Kızı, Lifetime honorary award
