= Nevra Serezli =

Turkish actress and voice actress (born 1944)

- Born: Nevra Şirvan; 9 August 1944 (age 82); Ankara, Turkey
- Education: Robert College
- Occupations: Film, stage, television and voice actress
- Years active: 1965–present
- Notable work: Zübük (1980), Kılıbık (1983), Hisseli Harikalar Kumpanyası (1988), Sihirli Annem (2003–2011), Altın Kızlar (2009)
- Spouse: Metin Serezli (m. 1968; died 2013)
- Children: 2
- Parent(s): Mehmet Abdülkadir Süreyya Şirvan; Ulya Şirvan

Nevra Serezli (born 9 August 1944) is a Turkish film, stage, television and voice actress. Serezli was married to the prominent actor Metin Serezli from 1968 until his death in 2013. Their son, Murat Serezli, is also an actor in Turkey.

== Early life and marriage ==
Nevra Serezli was born in 1944, in Ankara, Turkey. Her father, Mehmet Abdülkadir Süreyya Şirvan, was a businessman. Her paternal grandfather was from Şirvan, Azerbaijan. Her mother, Ulya Şirvan, was an ethnic Circassian. Before she turned one year old, her parents moved from Ankara to the yalı of her mother's family in Bebek, Istanbul. Nevra Serezli spent a vast majority of her childhood in Istanbul where she attended the American College for Girls. She lived in the neighbourhoods of Bebek, Arnavutköy, Teşvikiye and Kavacık, respectively. Nevra Serezli has a younger sister.

On 7 March 1968, she married the eminent actor and director Metin Serezli, whom she had met in 1966 and got engaged to in 1967. The couple had two sons, Murat and Selim, and two grandchildren. Metin Serezli died of lung cancer on 10 March 2013. He was buried at the Zincirlikuyu Cemetery following a religious funeral held at the Teşvikiye Mosque two days later.

== Career ==
Following her graduation from Robert College, she went on to study theatre. In 1965, she started working as a professional stage actress at the Dormen Theatre. Two years later, she appeared at the Ankara Art Theatre. Between 1971 and 1978, she performed in numerous plays with Altan Erbulak and Metin Serezli. In 1984, she registered with Devekuşu Kabare Tiyatrosu (Ostrich Cabaret Theatre) as an actress. She served at the Devekuşu Kabare until 1989. After reprising her duties at the Dormen Theatre in 1990, she joined the theatrical assembly called Tiyatro İstanbul. She gave lessons at the Language and Culture Centre (LCC).

Whilst a student at American College for Girls, she was spotted by college coaches with her role in the musical My Fair Lady. She took lessons from Müşfik Kenter, Melih Cevdet, Haldun Taner and Haldun Dormen. At the age of 22, she played in Cengiz Han'ın Bisikleti at the Dormen Theatre. She participated in theatre festivals in Italy and England.

Nevra Serezli's first film appearance was in the 1966 film Kara Tren and she went on to appear in the comedy films Ne Olacak Şimdi? (1979), Zübük (1980), Kılıbık (1983), Atla Gel Şaban (1984), Aşık Oldum (1985) and Şendul Şaban (1985).

She provided the Turkish voice of a character in the U.S. film Of Mice and Men. She has also starred in the films Unutulmayanlar (2006) and Senin Hikâyen (2013), amongst others. In 2015, she was cast as Peyker in Şebnem Burcuoğlu's adaptation of Kocan Kadar Konuş (2015).

Serezli's television work includes appearances in Ahududu (1974), Kavanozdaki Adam (1987), Sonradan Görmeler (1994–1996), Yerim Seni (1997), Vay Anam Vay (2001), Anne Babamla Evlensene (2005), Sevgili Dünürüm (2007), Altın Kızlar (2009), Başrolde Aşk (2011), Salih Kuşu (2013), Bebek İşi (2013) and Diğer Yarım (2014) before starring as Süreyya Üstün in the Star TV series Gönül İşleri in 2015.

She portrayed Dudu for five seasons in the Turkish television series Sihirli Annem from 2003 to 2011.

=== Stage career ===
Nevra Serezli's stage work includes appearances in Pierre Barillet and Jean-Pierre Gredy's Çetin Ceviz (1996–1996; Tiyatro İstanbul) and Acaba Hangisi (1988–1999; Tiyatro İstanbul), Refik Erduran's Cengiz Han'ın Bisikleti (Dormen Theatre), Turgut Özakman's Paramparça (Dormen Theatre) and Deliler (1984–1989, Devekuşu Kabare Tiyatrosu), Richard Alfieri's Six Dance Lessons in Six Weeks (Tiyatro İstanbul), A. R. Gurney's Sylvia (1999–2000; Tiyatro İstanbul), Jacques Deval's Tovaritch (Şahane Züğürtler), Lerner and Loewe's My Fair Lady, Aşk Münir Özkul Theatre, Hisseli Harikalar Kumpanyası (Şan Tiyatrosu), Işıklar Neden Karardı? (Çevre Tiyatrosu), Çılgın Sonbahar, Çıplak Ayaklı Kontes (Dormen Theatre), Durdurun Dünyayı İnecek Var, Geceye Selam, Gönül Hırsızı (Tiyatro İstanbul), Olur Böyle Vakalar (Çevre Tiyatrosu), Sait Hop Sait, Şen Sazın Bülbülleri and Yolun Yarısı (1990).

== Filmography ==
=== Film ===
Year	Film	Role	Notes
1966	Kara Tren	Kibar Ana	
1976	Ah Ne Güzel Nane Şekeri	Meloş	Voice of Alev Sururi
1976	Aman Karım Duymasın	Nurten	
1976	Bülbül Ailesi	Nevin	
1976	Saffet Beni Affet	Fahriye Başaran	
1976	İntikam Meleği: Kadın Hamlet	Theatre player	
1977	Özgürlüğün Bedeli		Television film
1979	Ne Olacak Şimdi?	Özden	
1979	Şark Bülbülü	Fethi Bey's sister	Voice of Ayşen Gruda
1980	Gerzek Şaban	Lale	Voice of Ülkü Özen
1980	Renkli Dünya	Meral	
1980	Zübük	Yektane	
1983	Dönme Dolap	Lamia	
1983	Kılıbık	Mihrimah	
1983	Metres	Müzeyyen	
1984	Atla Gel Şaban	Niyazi's wife Zehra	
1985	Aşık Oldum	Güzin "Güziş" Bostancı	
1985	Şendul Şaban	Necla	
1989	Ekran Aşıkları		
1994	Çılgın Sonbahar		Television film
1994	Şahane Züğürtler	Tatiana	Television film
2006	Unutulmayanlar	Leyla	
2013	Senin Hikâyen	Meral	
2015	Kocan Kadar Konuş	Peyker	
2016	Kocan Kadar Konuş: Diriliş	Peyker	
2022	İşte Bu Benim Masalım	Aleyna's grandmother Esin	

=== Television ===
Year	Film	Role	Notes
1974	Ahududu		
1977	Şıpsevdi	Eleni	
1987	Kavanozdaki Adam	İnci	
1988	Güler Misin Ağlar Mısın	Nevra	
1988	Hisseli Harikalar Kumpanyası	Süheyla Deniz	Musical television series
1988	Önce Canan		
1994–1996	Sonradan Görmeler	Şükran Partal	
1997	Yerim Seni		
1999	Kadınlar Kulübü		
2000	Melek Karım	Melek	
2001	Vay Anam Vay	Kibar Ana	
2002	Anne Babamla Evlensene	Leman	
2003	Mühürlü Güller		Guest
2003–2011	Sihirli Annem	Dudu	
2007	Sevgili Dünürüm	Güneş	
2009	Altın Kızlar	Gönül	
2011	Başrolde Aşk	Gönül Hanım	
2013	Bebek İşi	Suzan Candan Anne	
2013	Salih Kuşu	Zakkum	
2014	Diğer Yarım	Zeynep	
2015	Gönül İşleri	Süreyya Üstün	
2026	Tuzlu Kahve	Sitare Kutaygil	
