= Müjdat Gezen =

Turkish theatre actor and writer (born 1943)

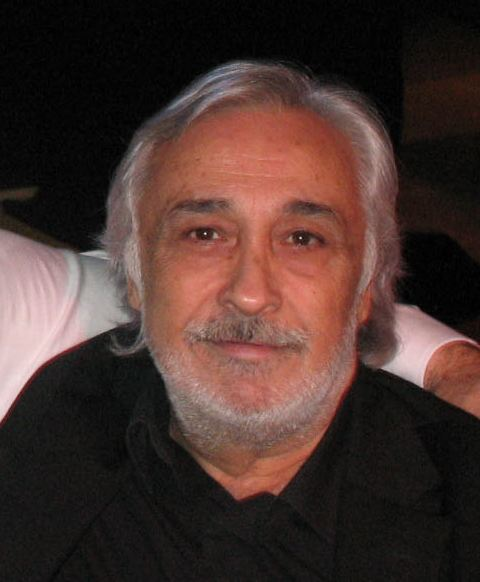
- Born: 29 October 1943 (age 81); Fatih, Istanbul, Turkey
- Occupation(s): Actor, writer, poet
- Years active: 1963–present
- Spouses: Gün İrk (1968–1980); Leyla Turgut (m. 1988)

Müjdat Gezen (born October 1943) is a Turkish theatre actor and writer.

== Private life ==
He was born on October 1943 in Istanbul. He studied in Vefa High School where he met Uğur Dündar and Kemal Sunal, who became lifelong friends. After graduation in 1960, he continued in the theatre section of İstanbul Municipality Conservatory. He is married and father of Elif Gezen.

== Milestones in his career ==
He was interested in poetry and theatre during his high school years. In 1960 he chose theatre as his profession in İstanbul Municipality theatre. In the following years he served in various private theatres. In 1962 he performed in his first film. He played in hit gypsy comedy films "Gırgıriye" and spin off series "Cennet Mahallesi". He wrote his first book in 1975. In the aftermath of the Turkish military coup of 1980, he was in prison for about twenty days and his book about the poet Nazim Hikmet was banned in Turkey. In 1982 he founded a publishing company. Between 1986-88 he wrote in Cumhuriyet newspaper as a columnist. In 1991 he founded an art company named after him; Müjdat Gezen Sanat Merkezi (MSM for short) which offers training in various stage arts such as theatre and music. He founded the Müjdat Gezen theatre company in 1998. In 1987, Gezen created the film Homoti, a low-budget LGBTQ+ version of E.T. the Extraterrestrial, which has since become a cult film. In 2007 he was appointed as the UNICEF Goodwill ambassador in Turkey. In 2011 together with Uğur Dündar he founded a Television School.

== Legal prosecution ==
He was being prosecuted for insulting the president Recep Tayyip Erdoğan for saying "know your place" referring to Erdoğan during a TV Show moderated by Uğur Dündar in 2018. He defended himself mentioning it couldn't be an insult, because the words are the same Erdogan used, while "know your place" is not listed as an insult in a dictionary as well.

== Books ==
The following are some of the books written by Müjdat Gezen

- Güle Güle Dünya Ben Burada kalıyorum ("Bye bye World, I stay here")
- Tanıdıklarım ("My Acquaintances")
- Kuzucuk ("Lambkin")
- Fıkracık ("Anectodes")
- Oyuculuk Eğitimi ("Stage Training")
- Ben Çocukken ("When I was a kid")
- Arkadaşım Maske ("My friend the Mask")
- Sınıf Bunadı ("The class goes senile")
- Aptal Hamdi Zor Durumda ("Hamdi the Stupid in bad")
- Aptal Hamdi Avustralya'da ("Hamdi the Stupid in Australia")
- Çizgilerle Nazım Hikmet ("Outline of Nazım Hikmet")
- Neden Dersen ("If you ask why")
- Oyunculuğun Felsefesi ("The philosophy of stage art")
- Aptal Hamdi Bizi Güldürüyor ("Hamdi the Stupid amuses us")
- Toplu Oyunlar ("Collective plays")
- Komikler Ağlamaz ("Comedians don't cry")
- Naftalin Bozulmuşsa ("If the Naphthalene spoils")
- Büyüyünce Ne olacan ("What will you be when you grow up")
- Çocuk Adam ("Undergrown man")
- Meşhur Yenikapı Cinayeti ("Infamous Yenikapı Murder")
- Salak Oğlum (My stupid son")
- Gırgıriye ("Jamboree")
- Babam ("My Father")
- Artiz Mektebi ("School of Actors")
- Yapabilirsin ("You can do it")
