= List of Turkish films of the 1990s =

A list of films produced in Turkey in the 1990s:

== 1990s ==
Title	Director	Cast	Genre	Notes
1990
Berdel	Atıf Yılmaz		Drama	
Benim Sinemalarım	Füruzan, Gülsün Karamustafa		Drama	
Hasan Boğuldu	Orhan Aksoy		Drama	
Journey of Hope	Xavier Koller	Nur Sürer, Necmettin Cobanoglu		
Karartma geceleri	Yusuf Kurçenli		based on novel	
Bütün kapılar kapalıydı	Memduh Ün		Drama	
Piyano piyano bacaksız	Tunç Başaran		Comedy, Drama, Family	
Aşk filmlerinin unutulmaz yönetmeni	Yavuz Tugrul		Comedy, Drama	
Abuk Sabuk Bir Film	Şerif Gören		Comedy, Drama, Fantasy	
Ölürayak	Aydın Bağardı			
Oğulcan	Cüneyt Arkın			
1991
Suyun Öte Yanı	Tomris Giritlioğlu			
Kara Sevdalı Bulut	Muammer Özer			
Uzun İnce Bir Yol	Tunç Başaran			
Mem-ü zin	Ümit Elçi			
Çıplak	Ali Özgentürk			
Gizli yüz	Ömer Kavur			
Bir Kadın	Ümit Efekan			
1992
Cazibe hanımın gündüz düşleri	Irfan Tözüm			
İki Kadın	Yavuz Özkan		Drama	
Gölge Oyunu	Yavuz Turgul			
Düş gezginleri	Atıf Yılmaz			
1993
Yaz Yağmuru	Tomris Giritlioğlu			
Amerikalı	Şerif Gören		Based on a novel	
Berlin in Berlin	Sinan Çetin		Drama	Entered into the 18th Moscow International Film Festival
Tersine dünya	Ersin Pertan			
1994
Bir sonbahar hikayesi	Yavuz Özkan			
Batık aşklar müzesi	Adnan Azar		Drama, Romance	
C Blok	Zeki Demirkubuz			
Yolcu	Başar Sabuncu		based on play	
Çözülmeler	Yusuf Kurçenli			
The Trace	Yeşim Ustaoğlu			Entered into the 19th Moscow International Film Festival
Tarzan of Manisa	Orhan Oğuz			
1995
Bir kadının anatomisi	Yavuz Özkan		Drama	
Böcek	Umut Elçi			
Bay E	Sinan Çetin			
1996
80. Adım	Tomris Giritlioğlu			
Aşk üzerine söylenmemiş herşey	Ömer Kavur, Erden Kıral			
Eşkiya	Yavuz Tugrul		Action, Crime, Drama, Thriller	
Yer çekimli aşklar	Orhan Oğuz, Ali Özgentürk			
İstanbul Kanatlarımın Altında	Mustafa Altıoklar			
Cémile	İsmet Elçi		Drama	
Tabutta rövaşata				
1997
Bir erkeğin anatomisi	Yavuz Özkan		Drama	
Ağır roman	Mustafa Altıoklar		Police, Murder	
Akrebin Yolculuğu	Ömer Kavur		Romance	Screened at the 1997 Cannes Film Festival
Hamam	Ferzan Özpetek			
Sawdust Tales/Usta Beni Öldürsene	Barış Pirhasan		Drama	
Mektup	Ali Özgentürk			
Masumiyet	Zeki Demirkubuz		Drama	
Nihavend Mucize	Atıf Yılmaz		Comedy, Fantasy	
1998
Sen de Gitme	Tunç Başaran		Drama	
Cumhuriyet	Ziya Öztan		History	
Kaçıklık diploması	Tunç Başaran			
Karışık pizza	Umur Turagay		Comedy, Crime, Thriller	
1999
Salkım Hanımın Taneleri	Tomris Giritlioğlu		Drama	
Hayal Kurma Oyunları	Yavuz Özkan		Drama	
Duruşma	Yalçın Yelence		Family, Comedy, Romance	
Propaganda	Sinan Çetin		Comedy	
Kaç Para Kaç	Reha Erdem		Drama	
Kayıkçı	Biket İlhan		Romance	
Mayıs sıkıntısı	Nuri Bilge Ceylan		Family, Cinema, Immigration, Alienation, Rural Life	
Üçüncü sayfa	Zeki Demirkubuz	Başak Köklükaya, Ruhi Sarı	Drama	
Harem Suare	Ferzan Özpetek		Drama, History	Screened at the 1999 Cannes Film Festival
Asansör	Mustafa Altıoklar		Drama	
Eylül Fırtınası	Atıf Yılmaz		Drama	
Nilgün	Ümit Efekan			
Güneşe Yolculuk	Yeşim Ustaoğlu			Entered into the 49th Berlin International Film Festival
