= İsmet Ergün =

Artist (born 1950)

İsmet Ergün (born 1950) is a Berlin artist and stage designer of Turkish provenance. Alongside her theatre work she has worked in the world of cinema as an art director and as a production designer. The short film "Bende Sıra" ("It's my turn") which she directed, and for which she herself wrote the screenplay, was singled out for commendation at the 2007 Locarno Film Festival: it also won the "Best German Film 2007" at the Berlin "Interfilm" festival later the same year.

== Life ==
=== Early years ===
İsmet Ergün was born in Konya, a substantial city in central southern Turkey. Since 1972 she has lived in Berlin. She attended the Berlin University of the Arts as a "guest student" in what was then West Berlin before moving on to a four-year teaching traineeship, undertaken between 1976 and 1980. For the next six years she worked as a teacher, still in West Berlin, though she also had contacts beyond the wall in the eastern half of the city. In 1988 she returned to the Berlin University of the Arts as a "guest student", complementing her studies with work as an actress in the Berlin immigrant theatre scene, appearing with Kemal Sunal in the Turkish language comedy film Polizei ("Police"). Between 1988 and 1991 Ergün trained as an artist and stage set designer with Andrej Woron, before embarking on a period of more formal study at the Berlin Arts Academy.

=== Artistic career ===
During this period (1990-1992) Ergün's first theatre work was as a direction and costume assistant for performances at the Teatr Kreatur in Berlin. She also undertook costume work for a World Aids Day production directed by Tom Fecht on the space outside the west front of Cologne Cathedral. Perhaps even more important in the context of her career development was work with Andrej Woron on costumes and masks for a theatre rework of The Blue Angel produced by Peter Zadek and Jérôme Savary at the Berlin Theater des Westens.

From 1994 until 1997 she took over equipment and costume management for a succession of television productions from Terre des hommes. In 1996 she significantly expanded her theatre work, this time with her involvement in a production of The Threepenny Opera at Bremen.

Between 1997 and 1999 Ergün's principal professional job was as art director for Sinan Çetin, the man who had created "Berlin in Berlin". Projects involving Ergün included his surreal comedy "Propaganda" (1999) and those parts of Kanak Attack (1999) filmed in Turkey. She also worked with Çetin on the Turkish television production "Evdeki yabanci" (1999).

In 2000 she worked on the first of a number of collaborations with the German-Turkish film maker Neco Celik. She was the production designer for his film Urban Guerillas (2003). In 2005 Ergün produced the stage sets for a theatre productions by Yüksel Yolcu of The Rose of Stamboul at the Neuköllner Opera (theatre in Berlin).

Her short film "Bende Sıra" ("It's my turn") appeared to draw on her earlier experience as a teacher of young children. It was premiered at the 2007 Locarno Film Festival, where it won the "Silver Leopard (Eastman Kodak) Award". A succession of further awards followed for Bende Sira.

Alongside film and theatre work, İsmet Ergün's paintings have featured in exhibitions in Germany and Turkey since the late 1980s.

=== Surveillance ===
Reports appeared in Germany's Der Spiegel and Turkey's Hürriyet in August/September 2008 indicating that İsmet Ergün had collaborated with the East German Ministry for State Security during the 1980s. The reports were based on research into the copious Stasi archives which had become accessible to researchers in the aftermath of reunification.

In 2008 İsmet Ergün defended her work for the Stasi during the 1980s to a Turkish newspaper

"Ben hiçbir ülke hakkında istihbaratta bulunmadım. Hiçbir ülkeyi zor duruma sokacak bilgiler vermedim. O zamanlar birçok arkadaşım gibi ben de sol görüşlüydüm. Faşizmin hem doğu hem batı için de tehlikeli olduğuna inanıyordum. Benim verdiğim bilgiler Nazilerle ilgili bilgilerdi. Onun dışında bilgi vermedim" dedi."

"I did not have secret information on any country. None of the information I provided would have created difficulties for any country. Like many of my friends back then I was on the political left. I believed fascism was dangerous, both for the east and for the west. None of the information I gave out went beyond that."

Sources which implicitly endorse the view that the 1981 attempt to assassinate the Pope was masterminded by the KGB and undertaken by a Turkish extremist only with active hands-on participation of East German and Bulgarian security services place Ergün's recruitment as a Stasi collaborator in the context of a wider attempt to recruit politically committed West Germans of Turkish provenance to the East German political cause and disseminate an acceptance in the west that the would-be assassin had acted without any Soviet-bloc involvement. It must be acknowledged that this back story is not one that goes entirely unchallenged, however. In 1982 İsmet Ergün crossed into East Germany to visit a friend. While she was in her friend's apartment a uniformed official knocked on the door to tell her that her car was illegally parked. She accompanied the official outside to resolve the matter. It turned out that the two Stasi officers waiting for her had no interest in any alleged parking offence. But they did request a meeting.

Records show that Ergün signed an agreement to work for the Stasi on 12 August 1983. She is identified in the files as "IM Isa". As the Spiegel report points out, "Isa" is both an Arabic word for Jesus and the name of the hotel near St. Peter's Square in Rome where Mehmet Ali Ağca, the Pope's would-be assassin had stayed while preparing his assassination attempt. The Stasi were keen to establish precise connections between Ağca and the Turkish nationalist Grey Wolves organization. Ergün, as a committed left winger, saw the Grey Wolves as political enemies. With help from fellow left-wing activists, she was able to obtain and provide reports, with photographs, on Grey Wolf members in Berlin. Information she provided enabled to Stasi to establish that Ağca had stayed in the same West Berlin hotel as Grey Wolf members before he traveled on to Rome, which was precisely the connection her handlers had been hoping to receive from her.

From the available information it appears that her later work, undertaken between 1983 and 1989, involved passing on to her East German handlers information about various politically active individuals and groups in West Germany's Turkish community. After 1990 German police questioned her about her reports for the security services of the by now defunct East German state. She stated that the information she had provided had concerned Nazis. Journalists reviewing her 1,500 page Stasi file later reported finding nothing about Nazis in it, but she was reporting on members of the German Turkish community from both the nationalist and left wing ends of the political spectrum. The files also showed periodic payments made to her of 1,000 Marks.
