= 1999 Shanghai International Film Festival =

Chinese film festival

The 4th Shanghai International Film Festival was held between October 22 and October 31, 1999. Like the previous year, the Film Festival was divided into four activities:

- Golden Cup International Film Competition
- International Film Panorama
- International Film and TV Market
- Retrospectives with Seminar

338 films were entered.

The Turkish film Propaganda was named the winner of the Golden Goblet.

== Jury ==
- Wu Yigong, director (China)
- Paolo Virzì, director (Italy)
- Yasuo Furuhata, director (Japan)
- Carole Bouquet, actress (France)
- Park Kwang-su, director (South Korea)
- Stanislav Rostotsky, director (Russia)
- Zheng Dongtian, director (China)

== In competition ==
Title	Director	Country
Art Museum by the Zoo	Lee Jeong-Hyang	South Korea
Back to Life	Pascal Baeumler	France
Beastie Girl	Johannes Frabrick	Austria
Dancing Soul	Lucia Rikaki	Greece
Genghis Khan	Fu Sai, Mai Lisi	People's Republic of China
Icespeed	Hu Xueyang	People's Republic of China
Laugh, So That The Photo Will Be Beautiful	Sherif Arafa	Egypt
The Lunatics' Ball	Michael Thorp	New Zealand
A Midsummer Night's Dream	Michael Hoffman	United States of America
The New Voyage	Yoji Yamada	Japan
The Prompter	Hidle Heier	Norway
Propaganda	Sinan Çetin	Turkey
Rhapsody of Spring	Teng Wenji	People's Republic of China
The Trunk	João Batista de Andrade	Brazil
Under the Sun	Colin Nutley	Sweden
The Wedding Cow	Tomi Streiff	Germany
With Fire and Sword	Jerzy Hoffman	Poland
A Woman of the North	Frans Weisz	France/Italy
Women...and Women	Saad Chraibi	Morocco

== Awards ==
=== Golden Goblet ===
- Best Film- Propaganda (Turkey)
  - Silver Cup for Best Film- The Prompter (Norway)
- Best Director- Yoji Yamada (for The New Voyage) (Japan)
- Best Actor- Ahmad Zaki for Laugh, So the Photo Will Be Beautiful (Egypt)
- Best Actress- Ai Liya for Genghis Khan (China)
- Best Music- Beastie Girl (Austria)
- Best Technology- A Midsummer Night's Dream (USA)

=== Special Jury Award ===
- The Lunatics' Ball (director, Michael Thorp) (New Zealand)
