= Hanım (film) =

- Directed by: Halit Refiğ
- Written by: Halit Refiğ; Nezihe Araz
- Produced by: Cengiz Ergun
- Starring: Yıldız Kenter; Eşref Kolçak; Fatoş Sezer; Faruk Dilaver; Cem Özer
- Cinematography: Çetin Tunca
- Edited by: Nevzat Dişiaçık
- Music by: Adnan Saygun; Cemal Reşit Rey
- Production company: Odak Film
- Release dates: October 1989 (Antalya Golden Orange Film Festival); 5 January 1990 (Turkey)
- Running time: 101 minutes
- Country: Turkey
- Language: Turkish

Hanım is a 1989 Turkish drama film directed and co-written by Halit Refiğ. Yıldız Kenter stars as an elderly widow, who has recently been diagnosed with terminal cancer, trying to find someone to take care of her cat Hanım. It premiered at the 26th Antalya Golden Orange Film Festival, where it was selected as the second runner-up of Best Film award and Refiğ won the Best Director award, and was theatrically released in Turkey on January 5, 1990.

== Synopsis ==
Mrs. Olcay, an elderly piano teacher residing in an ancient mansion, faces loneliness in a rapidly changing Istanbul. Her husband, a naval officer, died years ago, and her daughter remains distant. Her only companions are veteran steamboat captain Necip, her young student Canan, and her cat, Hanım. When Mrs. Olcay learns that she has uterine cancer, the fear of imminent death grips her. Yet, her greatest concern lies in Hanım's fate after her death. As she seeks a new owner for her beloved cat, she witnesses the apathy of those around her.

== Cast ==
- Yıldız Kenter as Olcay
- Eşref Kolçak as Necip
- Fatoş Sezer as Ülkü
- Faruk Dilaver as Kemal
- Cem Özer as Ender
- Orhan Çağman as Poyraz
- Ani İpekkaya as Siranuş
- Pamira Bezmen as Canan
- Ekrem Dümer as Dr. Suavi
- Müge Ergun as İnci
- Ferdi Atuner as Agah
- Çağrı Nakipoğlu as Selçuk
