= Kenter Theatre =

- Kenter Tiyatrosu
- Location within Istanbul
- Address: Harbiye Halaskargazi Cad. 9 Şişli, Istanbul; Turkey
- Coordinates: 41.04883°N 28.98730°E
- Owner: Yıldız Kenter and Müşfik Kenter
- Capacity: 303 seats
- Type: Theatre

Construction
- Opened: 1968; 58 years ago

Kenter Theatre (Turkish: Kenter Tiyatrosu) is a theatre located in Istanbul, Turkey established by Yıldız Kenter and Müşfik Kenter of the Kenter acting dynasty in 1968.

Kenter Theatre is situated on the Halaskargazi Avenue in Harbiye quarter of Şişli district in Istanbul, Turkey. It was established by the siblings, actress Yıldız Kenter and actor Müşfik Kenter, in 1968. It was renovated several times in the past, did not, however, change its original outlook. The theatre has a seating capacity of 303.

== Productions ==
- Evdeki Yabancı by Nuran Devres,
- Yarın Cumartesi by Robin Hawdon,
- Kapıcı (The Caretaker) by Harold Pinter,
- Baharın Sesi,
- Aptal Kız (Auprès de ma blonde) by Marcel Achard,
- Nalınlar by Necati Cumalı,
- Mary-Mary ( (Mary, Mary) by Jean Kerr,
- Gülerek Giriniz (Enter Laughing) by Joseph Stein,
- Martı (The Seagull) by Kenward Elmslie,
- Derya Gülü by Necati Cumalı,
- Pembe Kadın by Hidayet Sayın,
- Fadik Kız by Orhan Asena,
- Ver Elini Dünya by Brian Friel,
- Mikadonun Çöpleri (The Mikado) by W. S. Gilbert,
- Kırk Kırat (Forty Carats) by Jay Presson Allen,
- Üç Kız Kardeş (Three Sisters) by Anton Chekhov,
- İçerdekiler by Melih Cevdet Anday,
- Kim Kimi Kimle by Alan Ayckbourn,
- İkinci Sokak (The Prisoner of Second Avenue) by Neil Simon,
- Katır Tırnağı (La Peau de Vache) by Pierre Barillet & Jean-Pierre Gredy,
- Yasak Elma,
- Gece Mevsimi (The Night Season) by Rebecca Lenkiewicz,
- Anna Karanina (Anna Karenina) by Leo Tolstoy,
- Ben Anadolu by Güngör Dilmen,
- Kuyruk,
- Nasrettin Hoca Bir Gün by Ali Meriç.
