= Saliha Scheinhardt =

Turkish-German writer

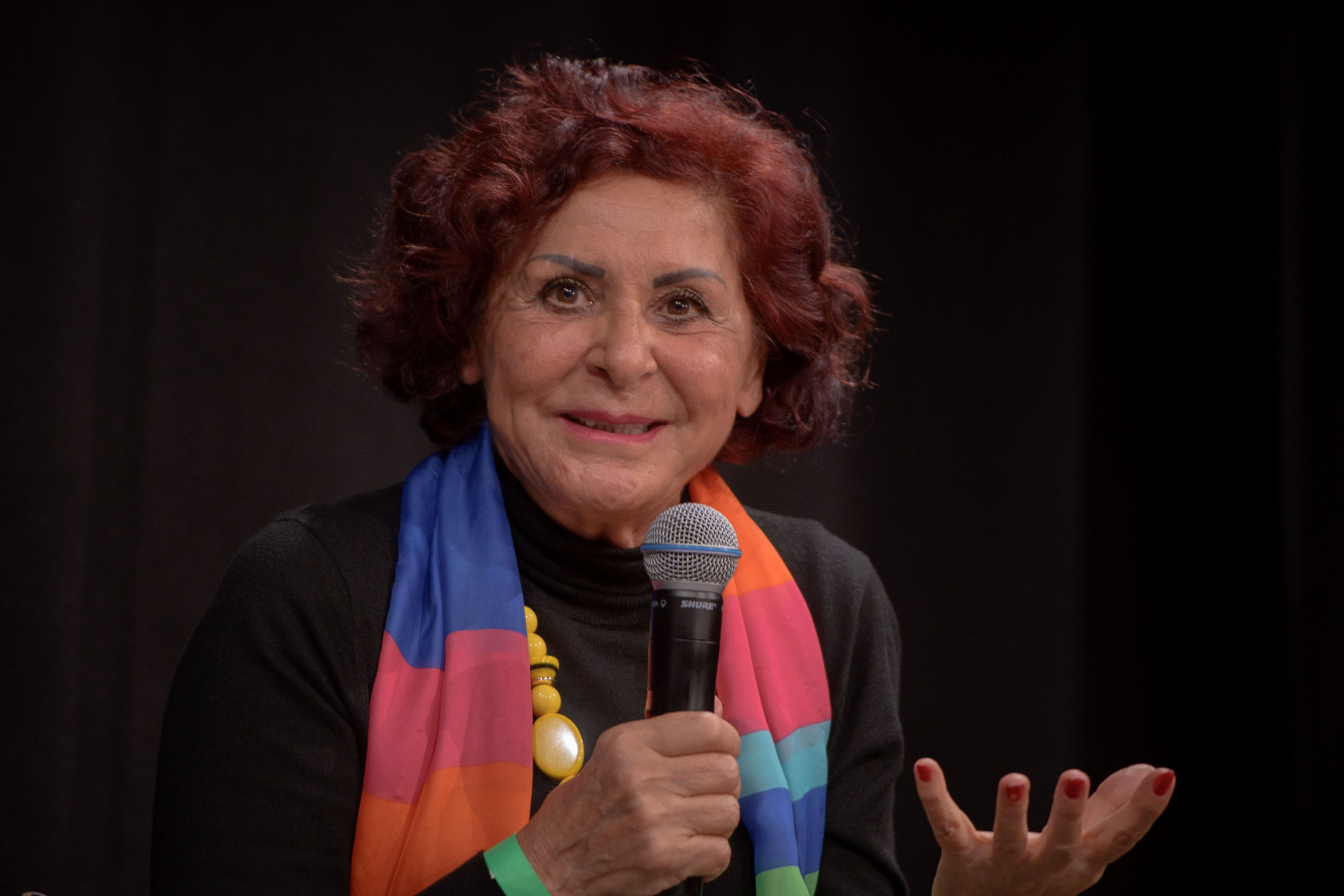
- Scheinhardt in 2021
- Born: 23 April 1946 (age 80); Konya, Turkey
- Education: University of Karlsruhe (1985, PhD)
- Occupations: Writer and university lecturer
- Notable work: Frauen, die sterben, ohne dass sie gelebt hätten (1983)

Saliha Scheinhardt (born 23 April 1946) is a Turkish-German writer and lecturer. Born in Turkey, she emigrated to West Germany in 1967, where she completed her doctorate and became a university lecturer. She was the first Turkish migrant woman writer in the German language, and has written several novels about oppressed people and groups, particularly Turkish women migrants.

== Early life, family and move to Germany ==
Scheinhardt was born in Konya, Turkey, in 1946. She married a German man at age 17 against the wishes of her family, and emigrated with him to West Germany in 1967. She commenced a teaching degree in 1971 at the Pädagogische Hochschule in Göttingen and then worked at Hauptschulen as a teacher. In 1979, she took a role as a scientific assistant at the Pädagogische Hochschule in Neuss. In 1985 she completed her doctorate on the impacts of Islam on the Turkish diaspora at the University of Karlsruhe, and later became a university lecturer.

In 1992 Scheinhardt said that her son was a soldier in the German army. She has personally experienced challenges as a Turkish woman migrant in Germany, and was once attacked with tear gas during a reading. She considers Germany to be her "linguistic and intellectual home", and as of 2000 had not allowed her works to be translated into Turkish due to concerns about censorship. In 2006 however her first novel was translated into Turkish.

== Literary career ==
Scheinhardt was the first Turkish migrant woman to write German language works, and her works have been commercially successful. Her works are often in the form of a fictional biography or case history. A common theme in her writing is minority women struggling to settle in a home, and many of her novels were influenced by casework she undertook during her doctoral studies.

Her early novels Frauen, die sterben, ohne dass sie gelebt hätten (1983) and Drei Zypressen (1984) (translating to "Women who die without having lived" and "Three cypresses" respectively) both featured Turkish women struggling to settle in Germany while also dealing with the challenges of living in Islamic families. Und die Frauen weinten Blut (1985) (translating to "And the women wept blood") was about Turkish village women moving to urban slums from where they hope to move to Germany. Academic response to her early work was mixed; for example Heidrun Suhr praised the accuracy and "strong impression" left by Scheinhardt's first two novels, but was concerned that they could increase prejudice towards Islamic families and treated Turkish women as stereotypical victims. More recently, scholars have said that her works are more complex than these comments suggest. In 2006, Frauen, die sterben, ohne dass sie gelebt hätten was published in a Turkish language version (with some modifications) as Pusuda Kin.

In Sie zerrissen die Nacht (1993) (translating to "They demolished the night") she tells the story of a Kurdish woman and her family who try to find a home in Turkey and then Germany, suffering from violence and persecution in each place. Die Stadt und das Mädchen ("The city and the girl"), published the same year, is a semi-autobiographical novel about a woman who returns to her homeland Turkey from Germany and is struck by the oppression of Turkish women. Valerie Weinstein of the University of Nevada notes that it addresses issues such as "gender, power, narrative, economic relations, tourism, and the relationships between Germans and Turks". It followed an earlier semi-autobiographical work, Träne für Träne werde ich heimzahlen: Kindheit in Anatolien ("I'll pay back tear for tear: childhood in Anatolia") published in 1987.

Scheinhardt has continued to publish novels into the 21st century, such as Lebensstürme (2000) and Töchter des Euphrat (2005). Weinstein identifies that Scheinhardt's later works have a tendency to be written in non-linear and fragmented style, unlike her earlier works which tended to be told chronologically. In 2017, a collection of letters between Scheinhardt and author Aziz Nesin over the period 1980 to 1994 was published. The two wrote to each other in the Turkish language, discussing and supporting each other's work, and Nesin (who could not read German) often tried to encourage Scheinhardt to write in her native language despite her reluctance to do so.

== Awards and adaptations ==
In 1985 she received the Offenbach Literature Prize, and in 1993 she received the Alfred-Müller-Felsenburg-Preis. In 1995 she received a medal from the city of Seligenstadt. Her book Frauen, die sterben, ohne dass sie gelebt hätten was the basis for the film Abschied vom falschen Paradies (1989) directed by Tevfik Başer. In 1991, following the release of the film, she republished the novel with an additional epilogue with a more hopeful outcome for the main character.

== Selected works ==
- Frauen, die sterben, ohne dass sie gelebt hätten (1983)
- Drei Zypressen (1984)
- Und die Frauen weinten Blut (1985)
- Die religiöse Lage in der Türkei (1986)
- Träne für Träne werde ich heimzahlen: Kindheit in Anatolien (1987)
- Von der Erde bis zum Himmel Liebe (1988)
- Liebe, meine Gier, die mich friẞt (1992)
- Sie zerrissen die Nacht (1993)
- Die Stadt und das Mädchen (1993)
- Mondscheinspiele (1996)
- Lebensstürme (2000)
- Töchter des Euphrat (2005)
- Schmerzensklänge (2008)
- Wahnliebe (2015)
- Aziz Nesin Saliha Scheinhardt mektuplaşmaları : bozkır fırtınası (in Turkish, with Aziz Nesin, 2017)
