= Eşref Kolçak =

Turkish-Russian actor (1927–2019)

- Born: 28 January 1927; Russia
- Died: 26 May 2019 (aged 92); Gemlik, Bursa, Turkey
- Occupation: Actor
- Years active: 1942–2019
- Spouse: Özcan Kolçak (m. 1954; died 2010)
- Children: Harun Kolçak

Eşref Kolçak (28 January 1927 – 26 May 2019) was a Turkish-Russian actor.

== Biography ==
Eşref Kolçak was born in Russia. His father was Harun Kolçakoğlu, and his mother was of Russian descent, his family moved to Turkey, Erzurum when he was 5 years old. At the age of 14, his family moved to Istanbul. He studied at the Sultan Ahmet Arts Institute. In 1944, he appeared in his first play at the Atilla Review. In 1947, he made his film debut and went on to appear in over 180 films and series. Kolçak won a Golden Orange in 2000 for his performance in Güle Güle. He was the father of musician Harun Kolçak, who died of prostate cancer on 19 July 2017.

== Filmography ==
- New York'ta Beş Minare (2010)
- Kollama (2010)
- Yalan Dünya (2007)
- Tutkunum Sana (2006)
- Kınalı Kuzular: Nişanlıya Verilen Söz (2006)
- Zeynep (2005)
- Kimsesiz Zaman Tasvirleri (2004)
- Kayıp Aşklar (2004)
- Yadigar (2004)
- Yağmur Zamanı (2004)
- Çanakkale: Son Kale (2003)
- Umutların Ötesi (2003)
- Kınalı Kar (2002)
- Yeşil Işık (2001)
- Aşk Hırsızı (2000)
- Ağaçlar Ayakta Ölür (2000)
- Güle Güle (1999)
- Sırılsıklam (1998)
- Affet Bizi Hocam (1998)
- İntizar (1997)
- Bir Umut (1997)
- Hüzün Çiçeği (1996)
- Sahte Dünyalar (1995)
- Çiçek Taksi (1995)
- Kanayan Yara - Bosna Mavi Karanlık (1994)
- Rüyalara Gelin (1993)
- Berlin in Berlin (1993)
- Zirvedekiler (1993)
- Hüdayi Yolu / Aziz Mahmud Hüdai Hz. (1993)
- Yağmur Beklerken (1992)
- Polis (1992)
- Aile Bağları (1991)
- Köroğlu (1991)
- Vurguna İnmek (1990)
- Yuva (1990)
- Kanun Savaşçıları (1989)
- Meçhul Tohum (1988)
- Yaşamak (1988)
- Hanım (1988) - Necip
- Benim Olsaydın (1987)
- Bomba (1987)
- Çakırcalı Mehmet Efe (1987)
- Yavrumu Kurtarın (1987)
- Çatallı Köy (1987)
- Kuruluş / Osmancık (1987)
- Dikenli Yol (1986)
- Yarın Ağlayacağım / Erkekler de Ağlar (1986)
- Çalıkuşu (1986)
- Altar (1985)
- Domdom Kurşunu (1985)
- Yaranamadım (1985)
- Suçlu Gençlik (1985)
- Kahreden Gençlik (1985)
- Feryat (1983)
- Kahır (1983)
- Esir (1983)
- İkimiz De Sevdik (1983)
- Küçük Ağa (1983)
- Dört Yanım Cehennem (1982)
- Kelepçe (film) (1982)
- Öğretmen Kemal (1981)
- Takip (1981)
- Unutulmayanlar (1981) -
- Önce Hayaller Ölür (1981)
- Fırat (1979)
- Hayat Harcadın Beni (1979)
- Süpermen Dönüyor (1979)
- Ölüm Görevi (1978)
- Kaybolan Yıllar (1978)
- Görünmeyen Düşman (1978)
- Denizin Kanı (1978)
- Akrep Yuvası (1977)
- Şeref Sözü (1977)
- Silah Arkadaşları (1977)
- Lanet / İlenç (1977)
- Yuvanın Bekçileri (1977)
- Hain (1977)
- Hedefteki Adam (1977)
- Yıkılmayan Adam (1977)
- Bedia (1977) - Halil
- Tek Başına (1976)
- Kader Bu (1976)
- Mikrop (1976)
- Örgüt (1976)
- Seni Sevmekle Suçluyum (1976)
- Bizim Düğün Ne Zaman (1976)
- Gurbetçiler Dönüyor (1976)
- Şafakta Buluşalım (1975)
- Cemil (1975)
- Kanlı Sevda (1974)
- Kalleş (1974)
- Alo Polis (1974)
- Eski Kurtlar (1974)
- Şehitler (1974)
- Kurt Kapanı (1973)
- Soğukkanlılar (1973)
- Topal (1973)
- Vahşet (1973)
- Bu Toprağın Kızı (1973)
- Cezanı Çekeceksin (1972)
- Son Duanı Et (1972)
- Silahlar Affetmez (1971)
- Üç Öfkeli Adam (1971)
- Kartallar (1971)
- Bela Çiçekleri (1970)
- Bu Yumruk Sana (1970)
- Ölüm Pazarı (1970)
- Günahını Kanlarıyla Ödediler (1969)
- Beyaz Mendilim (1969)
- Emmioğlu (1969)
- Eşkiya Aşkı (1969)
- Satılık Gelin (1969)
- Şeytanın Oyunu (1969)
- Kardeş Kurşunu (1969)
- Mekansız Kurtlar (1968)
- Cehennemde Boş Yer Yok (1968)
- Kurşun Yolu (1968)
- Bir Mahkum Kaçtı (1968)
- Kızgın Adam (1968)
- Dertli Pınar (1968)
- Kara Kartal (1967)
- Kocadağlı (1967)
- İslamoğlu (1966)
- Kanlı Pazar (1966)
- Kıran Kırana (1966)
- Namus Borcu (1966)
- Ölüm Busesi (1966)
- Dalgacı Mahmut (1965)
- Düşman Kardeşler (1965)
- Kanunsuzlar (1965)
- Yumruk Yumruğa (1965)
- Filinta Kadri (1964)
- Yalnız Efe (1964)
- Erkek Ali (1964)
- Yarın Bizimdir (1963)
- Korkusuz Kabadayı (1963)
- Gecelerin Hakimi (1963)
- Rüzgarlı Tepe (1963)
- Öksüz Hasan (1963)
- Hancının Kızı (1963)
- Beyoğlu Piliçleri (1963)
- Başımı Belaya Sokma (1963)
- Çıkar Yol (1962)
- Dağlar Bulutlu Efem (1962)
- Bardaktaki Adam (1962)
- Aşk Bekliyor (1962)
- Boşver Doktor (1962)
- Beş Kardeştiler (1962)
- Kurşun Yağmuru (1962)
- Silah Arkadaşları (1962)
- Çöpçatan (1962)
- Ümitler Kırılınca (1962)
- Düğün Alayı (1961)
- Kaderin Önüne Geçilmez (1961)
- Şoför Ahmet (1961)
- Ayşecik Şeytan Çekici (1960)
- Gece Kuşu (1960)
- Namus Uğruna (1960)
- Beklenen Bomba (1959)
- Dağlar Şahini Yörük Efe (1959)
- Düşman Yolları Kesti (1959)
- Hayatım Sana Feda (1959)
- Unutulmayan Aşk / Zeynebim (1959)
- Civan Ali (1958)
- Kumpanya (1958)
- Ninni Talihsiz Yetime (1958)
- Sokak Çocuğu (1958)
- Bir Şoförün Gizli Defteri (1958)
- Kin (1957)
- Ceylan Emine (1957)
- Öksüz Ayşe (1957)
- Yangın (1956)
- Zeynep'ın İntikamı (1956)
- Şehir Yıldızları (1956)
- Yetim Yavrular (1955)
- Kanlarıyla Ödediler (1955)
- Çılgınlar Cehennemi (1954)
- Gülnaz Sultan (1954)
- Ölüme Giden Yol (1954)
- Çalsın Sazlar Oynasın Kızlar / Oyna Kızım Oyna (1954)
- Affet Beni Allahım (1953)
- Fedakar Ana (1949)
