= Fathers & Sons (1992 film) =

- Directed by: Paul Mones
- Written by: Paul Mones
- Produced by: Jon Kilik
- Starring: Jeff Goldblum; Rory Cochrane; Rosanna Arquette; Famke Janssen; Natasha Gregson Wagner; Paul Hipp; Michael Imperioli; Ellen Greene; Samuel L. Jackson
- Cinematography: Ron Fortunato
- Edited by: Janice Keuhnelian
- Music by: Mason Daring
- Production company: Addis/Wechsler
- Distributed by: Pacific Films
- Release dates: January 24, 1992 (Sundance); November 6, 1992 (United States)
- Running time: 109 minutes
- Country: United States
- Language: English
- Budget: $1.5 million

Fathers & Sons is a 1992 American crime drama film written and directed by Paul Mones and starring Jeff Goldblum, Rory Cochrane, Rosanna Arquette, Natasha Gregson Wagner and Famke Janssen (in her film debut). The film is about the connection between a father and son complicated by the foibles of a serial killer and the interactions of a psychic.

The film premiered at the 1992 Sundance Film Festival, and also won the Audience Award at the Deauville Film Festival. The film was entered into the 18th Moscow International Film Festival.

== Plot ==
Max Fish is a failed, reclusive film director who has moved to the small New Jersey seaside town of Belmar from New York City with his wife and son, Ed. When his wife dies, he is left to raise his son on his own. Max opens up a bookstore and becomes involved in marathon running. He also participates in a local theater production of a Don Quixote play. However, he is struggling in his parental role, as Ed is becoming increasingly involved in drug usage, sex, and gang violence. Max also battles his own alcohol addiction as well as guilt over his wife's death.

The chasm between father and son seems to be growing despite Max's best efforts. During Max's morning jogs, he routinely passes by a psychic. The psychic tells him that one night a serial killer will attack Ed on the beach. Ed continues to ignore the advice of his father and seems increasingly beyond hope of redemption in the eyes of society, but when he prevents the murder of a rival gang member, he shows potential for betterment. A serial killer, dubbed the "Shore Killer", does indeed descend on the town as the psychic predicted, but Max ends up saving his son before the killer can strike.

== Cast ==
- Jeff Goldblum as Max Fish
- Rory Cochrane as Ed Fish
- Mitchell Marchand as Smiley
- Famke Janssen as Kyle Christian
- Natasha Gregson Wagner as Lisa
- Erika Alexander as Venell
- Rocky Carroll as Flo
- Paul Hipp as Doogy
- Michael Imperioli as Johnny
- Ellen Greene as Judy
- Samuel L. Jackson as Marshall
- Joie Lee as Lois
- Rosanna Arquette as Miss Athena
- Michael Disend as Shore Killer
- Margaret T. Barker as Old Lady

== Release ==
Fathers & Sons premiered at the 1992 Sundance Film Festival. It received a limited theatrical release on November 6, 1992.

== Critical reception ==
In a negative review, Rita Kempley of The Washington Post called the film a "goopy bonding movie." Marjorie Baumgarten of The Austin Chronicle was more positive, writing "Though its screenplay is at times too preciously poetic (borrowing the title Fathers and Sons from Turgenev's great novel gives you some idea of this movie's ambitions), it also manages to make palpable some of the unspoken distances and connections between people." Baumgarten praised the cast, but critiqued the script and the subplot about the Shore Killer. Janet Maslin of The New York Times also criticized the serial killer plot line, but wrote the film "really rises to the subject of substance abuse, with a sequence that crosscuts Ed's drug experimentation with Max's efforts to resist drinking", and "Mr. Goldblum brings gentleness and intensity to a character who might otherwise be entirely insufferable".
