= Yavrum =

- Ayşecik Yavrum, 'Karataşlı Emine'
- Directed by: Orhan Aksoy
- Written by: Hamdi Değirmencioğlu
- Story by: İnci Aral
- Produced by: Nahit Ataman
- Starring: Zeynep Değirmencioğlu; Semra Sar; Metin Serezli
- Cinematography: Cahit Engin
- Edited by: Özdemir Arıtan
- Music by: Abdullah Nail Bayşu
- Production company: Arzu Film
- Release date: 1970
- Running time: 97 minutes
- Country: Türkiye
- Language: Turkish

Yavrum (Turkish = My little one) is a 1970 Turkish drama film directed by Orhan Aksoy and written by Hamdi Değirmencioğlu. The film was co-produced by Nahit Ataman and Ertem Eğilmez. The full original title of the film as it is mentioned in the Turkish film history is Ayşecik Yavrum, 'Karataşlı Emine'.

== Plot ==
Emine is pregnant, when her husband Ali joins the army. Since Ali has no relatives in the village, he asks Emine to go back to her father's village, until he returns from the military service. Emine who does not want to be a burden to anyone in the absence of her husband, prefers to stay in the village relying on the job that Midwife Nazife has found for her. In this way, Emine believes that she can more easily endure her husband's absence.

The job that Midwife Nazife has found for Emine is actually a trap. Hosts Handan and Cemal are aimed at stealing Emine's baby by compromising with Midwife Nazife. In this way, Handan wants to take money from her father who is longing for grandchildren, and to make him forgive herself and her husband Cemal who is a losing gambler. After Emine gives birth to her baby named Ayşe, Ebe Nazife and Handan send Emine to visit her sick husband in the army and kidnap Ayşe. Bad news awaits Emine, when she comes back. Midwife Nazife tells Emine that Ayşe is dead. When Ali cannot hear from Emine for a long time, Ali decides to go home on sick leave and receives the bitter news.

Growing up as the daughter of a wealthy family, years later Ayşe is now a young girl. A surprise awaits Ayşe, when she goes on vacation to her friend's farm.

== Cast ==
The film, starring Zeynep Değirmencioğlu, Semra Sar, and Metin Serezli, has a cast featuring the actors and actresses of Turkish cinema: Suzan Avcı, Önder Somer, Mürüvvet Sim, Handan Adalı, Cevat Kurtuluş, Nubar Terziyan, Osman Alyanak, and Münir Özkul. Zeynep Değirmencioğlu, who made an impact on Turkish cinema with the child character Ayşecik, once again appears before the audience as the character Ayşe in this film. Semra Sar as Emine and Metin Serezli as Ali play Ayşe's biological parents, while Suzan Avcı as Handan and Önder Somer as Cemal play her step-parents. And Münir Özkul is in the role of the protective grandfather of Ayşe.

Cast and dubbing crew
Actor/actress	Role	Voice artist	Actor/actress	Role	Voice artist
Zeynep Değirmencioğlu	Ayşe	Nursam Alçam	Nezihe Güler	Oya's mother	No
Semra Sar	Emine	Jeyan Mahfi Tözüm	Osman Alyanak	Photographer	No
Metin Serezli	Ali	No	Muammer Gözalan	Lawyer	Erdoğan Esenboğa
Suzan Avcı	Handan	Alev Koral	Gani Dede	Durmuş Baba	Ünal Gürel
Önder Somer	Cemal	Hayri Esen	Ahmet Turgutlu	Captain	No
Mürüvvet Sim	Nanny	No	Yusuf Sezer	Postman	No
Handan Adalı	Midwife Nazife	Suna Pekuysal	Hüseyin Salıcı	Judge	Timuçin Caymaz
Ayşe Emel Mesçi	Oya	No	Ali Demir	Army doctor	No
Cevat Kurtuluş	chauffeur	Erdoğan Esenboğa	Zeki Sezer (oyuncu)	Doctor in Adana	Erdoğan Esenboğa
Nubar Terziyan	Gardener	Rıza Tüzün	Nermin Özses	Catton labourer	Ayşegül Devrim
Faik Coşkun	Doctor	Timuçin Caymaz	and Münir Özkul	Grandfather	No

== Production ==
The film was co-produced by Nahit Ataman and Ertem Eğilmez. Part of the film was shot in Çukurova, another part in Antalya, and some scenes at the Adana railway station.

== Themes ==
The film is named after the character Emine who desperately and hysterically adopts a black stone in place of her baby Ayşe, when she is unexpectedly told about her death. The black stone embodies the metaphor of motherly-love and sorrow 'fulfilling' the absence of the baby. The drama becomes an exciting study of fate and motherly-love with alternating scenes of loss and hope, of sorrow and joy, as the audience knows from the very beginning that Ayşe is actually alive.
