= Zeynep Değirmencioğlu =

Turkish actress (born 1954)

- Born: 12 September 1954 (age 71); Istanbul, Turkey
- Occupation: Actress
- Years active: 1956–1974
- Spouse: Serkan Acar (m. 1975; died 2013)
- Children: 2

Zeynep Değirmencioğlu (born 12 September 1954) is a Turkish actress.

== Biography ==
She was born in Istanbul in 1954. She made her first appearance as a one-year-old baby in "Papatya" and established herself as a childstar with appearances in films like "Duvaklı Göl" and "Fırtına". In 1960 she acted in "Ayşecik". The persona of Ayşecik, a sweet, naive girl became her signature role. In the following years she would act in many films where she would play the Ayşecik persona in different settings. Although she appeared in more mature films, she is known as the most famous child actor in Turkish cinema. She retired from acting in 1974 with Macera Yolu (Adventure Road) as adult themed fare began to dominate the Turkish film industry and general audience fare moved to television.

After retiring from acting, she became a businesswoman. She is widow of Serkan Acar and has two children.

== Filmography ==
- Papatya (1956)
- Ölümden De Acı (1958)
- Funda (1958)
- Duvaklı Göl (1958)
- Ömrüm Böyle Geçti (1959)
- Ayşecik Şeytan Çekici (1960)
- Ayşecik (1960)
- Altın Kalpler (1961)
- Ayşecik Yavru Melek (1962)
- Ayşecik Ateş Parçası (1962)
- Ayşecik Fakir Prenses (1963)
- Ayşecik Canımın İçi (1963)
- Öksüz Kız (1964)
- Ayşecik Cimcime Hanım (1964)
- Ayşecik Çıtı Pıtı Kız (1964)
- Ayşecik Boş Beşik (1965)
- İki Yavrucak (1965)
- Sokak Kızı (1966)
- Çalıkuşu (1966)
- Zehirli Çiçek (1967)
- Merhamet (1967)
- Ayşecik Canım Annem (1967)
- Yüzbaşının Kızı (1968)
- Yuvana Dön Baba (1968)
- Ayşecik Yuvanın Bekçileri (1969)
- Sevgili Babam (1969)
- Ayşecik'le Ömercik (1969)
- Fakir Kızın Romanı (1969)
- Yavrum (1970)
- Ayşecik Sana Tapıyorum (1970)
- Pamuk Prenses Ve 7 Cüceler (1970)
- Ayşecik Ve Sihirli Cüceler Rüyalar Ülkesinde (1971)
- Hayat Sevince Güzel (1971)
- Ayşecik Bahar Çiçeği (1971)
- Sinderella Kül Kedisi (1971)
- Hayat Mı Bu (1972)
- Gelinlik Kızlar (1972)
- İlk Aşk (1972)
- Anneler Günü (1973)
- Öksüzler (1973)
- Özleyiş (1973)
- Kara Sevda (1973)
- Yayla Kızı (1974)
- Macera Yolu (1974)
