= Badi Uzzaman =

Pakistani British actor (1939–2011)

Mohammed Badi Uzzaman Azmi (Urdu:بدی الزمان) (8 March 1939 – 14 June 2011), better known as Badi Uzzaman, was a Pakistani-British television and film actor. According to The Guardian, Uzzaman was perhaps best known for his role as a hospital patient in the 1986 television series, The Singing Detective, opposite actor Michael Gambon. He later appeared in numerous television roles during his career, often as a supporting character, including Torchwood, Inspector Morse, Coronation Street, Cracker, The Bill and Casualty.

Uzzaman was born on 8 March 1939, in Phulpur, Azamgarh, British India. His father worked for the railway industry, so he moved to the city of Abbottabad in present-day Pakistan. He continued to move with his family depending on his father's job postings, which included time in both Quetta and Lahore. Uzzaman graduated from Government College, Abbottabad, in 1959, where he studied English and Urdu.

Uzzaman began his career as a radio presenter in Pakistan. He switched to acting, appearing in roles in Pakistan Television Corporation (PTV) dramas following the state-owned channel's launch in 1964.

In 1984, Uzzaman was cast in Malia, a Pakistani film about a traveling fair with a strong, underlying theme against the martial law rule of General Muhammad Zia-ul-Haq. In the film, Uzzaman played five different characters. The film was sharply rebuked by Zia's government, and had to be completed in London. Uzzaman left Pakistan and was granted political asylum in the United Kingdom soon after Malia's release. He became a British citizen.

At the age of 72, Uzzaman died of a lung infection on 14 June 2011.

== Partial filmography ==
- Intekhab (1978)
- Mehman (1978)
- Teesra Kinara (1980) - Haleem Hafazi
- My Beautiful Laundrette (1985) - Dealer
- Christmas Present (1985) - Mr. Amir Mehrban
- Personal Services (1987) - Mr. Patel
- Sammy and Rosie Get Laid (1987) - Ghost
- Cry Freedom (1987) - Mortician's assistant
- Bellman and True (1987) - Shopkeeper
- Karachi (1989) - Family father
- Lebewohl, Fremde (1991) - Badi
- K2 (1991) - Ibrahim
- Immaculate Conception (1992) - Dadaji's Retainer
- Son of the Pink Panther (1993) - Wasim
- Bhaji on the Beach (1993) - Uncle
- Brothers in Trouble (1995) - Old Ram
- My Son the Fanatic (1997) - Man in mosque
- You're Dead (1999) - Dr. Chandra
- Mad Cows (1999) - Indian shopkeeper
- Kevin & Perry Go Large (2000) - Shopkeeper
- The Fourth Angel (2001) - Dr. Mackay
- All or Nothing (2002) - Passenger #1
- Cross My Heart (2003) - Vikram
- The Baby Juice Express (2004) - Singh
- Yasmin (2004) - Hassan
- Red Mercury (2005) - Mr. Mulley
- Eastern Promises (2007) - Chemist
- In Your Dreams (2008) - Kung fu waiter
- Caught in the Act (2008) - Mr. Patel
- Another Year (2010) - Mr. Gupta
- Forget Me Not (2010) - Shopkeeper
