= The Bloody Farm =

1953 film

- Directed by: Faruk Kenç
- Written by: Faruk Kenç
- Produced by: Faruk Kenç
- Cinematography: İlhan Arakon; Enver Burçkin
- Music by: Sadi Yaver Ataman
- Production company: Istanbul Film
- Release date: 19 March 1953
- Country: Turkey
- Language: Turkish

The Bloody Farm (Turkish: Kanlı Çiftlik) is a 1953 Turkish drama film directed by Faruk Kenç.

== Cast ==
- Belgin Doruk
- Mahir Özerdem
- Bülent Ufuk
- Vedat Karaokçu
- Mine Coskun
- Zeki Alpan
- Ali Üstüntas
- Zihni Rona
- Aliye Rona
- Necmi Büken
- Cemal Karakas
- Kadir Savun
- Cahit Irgat as Berküren

== Bibliography ==
- Mustafa Gökmen. Eski İstanbul sinemaları. İstanbul Kitaplığı Yayınları, 1991.
