= İslamoğlu =

İslamoğlu is a Turkish surname. It may refer to:

- Cem Islamoglu (born 1980), German footballer of Turkish descent,
- Halime İslamoğlu (born 1993), Turkish female handball player,
- Mustafa İslamoğlu (born 1960), Turkish theologian, poet, writer,
