= Mehmet Galip Bey =

Ottoman senator and statesman

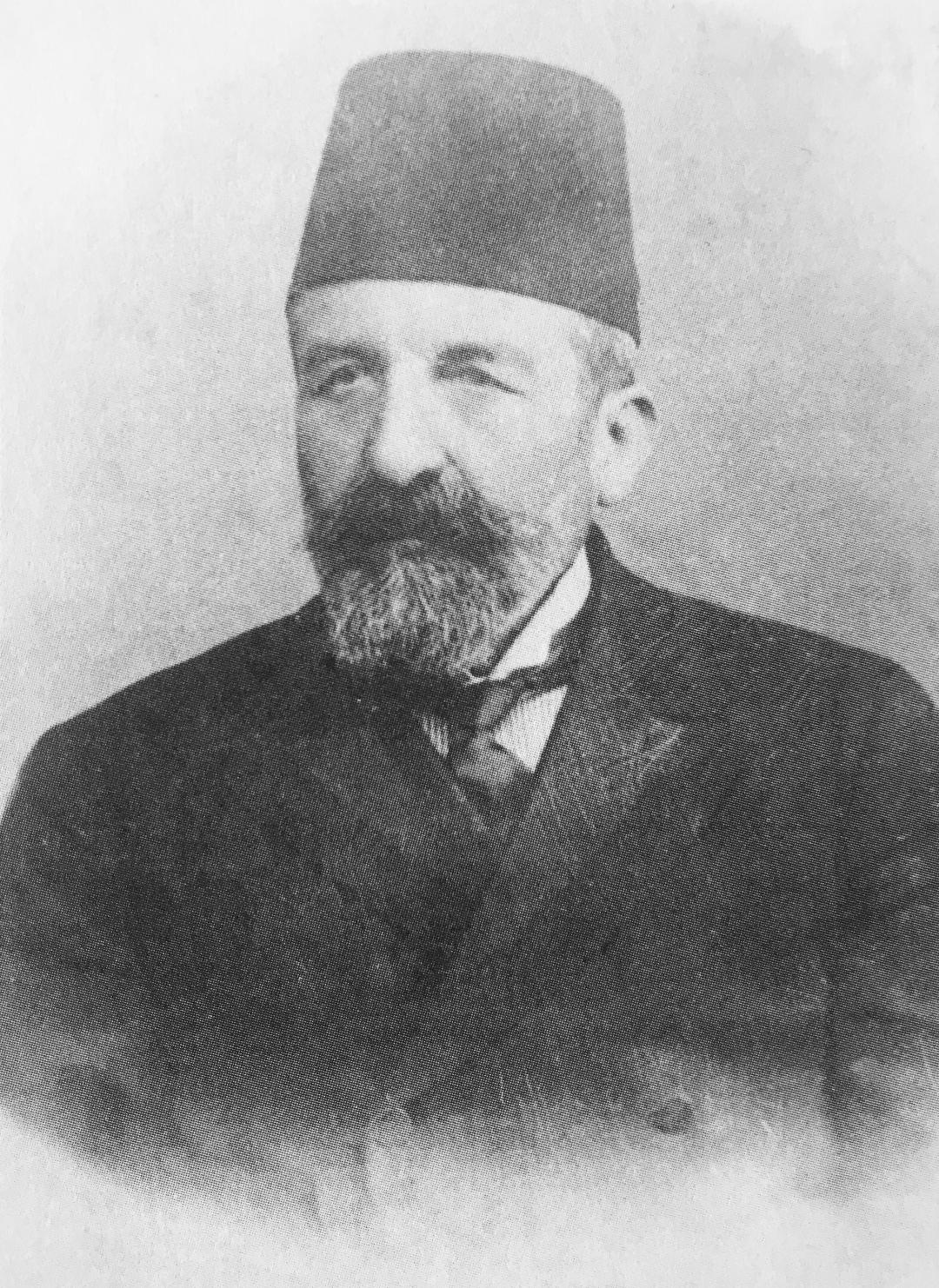

Senator of the Ottoman Empire
- In office 1908–1915

Personal details
- Born: 1854 Niğde, Ottoman Empire (now Niğde, Turkey)
- Died: 1915 (aged 60–61) Ottoman Empire

Mehmet Galip Bey (1854–1915) was an Ottoman statesman who served as a Senator of the Ottoman Empire from 1908 till his death in 1915.

Mehmet Galip Bey was born in Niğde in 1854. He is the son of Mehmet Said Efendi. He took lessons from private teachers. He learned Arabic, Persian and French. At the age of sixteen, he was appointed as assistant director of Muş tahrirat. He remained in this post for only one year. He resigned a year later and returned to Istanbul. He entered the Finance Letter Office. In 1873, he was appointed to the Directorate of Landscaping of the Süleymaniye Sanjak. While he was a letterman in the Danube Vilayet, he had to return to Istanbul due to the war. He was appointed as a member of the Bidayet Court in 1880. He served as a Member, Prosecutor, and Chief of the Bidayet Court in Konya, Istanbul, Thessaloniki, Adana, Baghdad, Sivas and Ankara. He worked as an Inspector of the Judiciary in Manastır, Kosovo. He became a member of the Committee of Union and Progress. He wrote poems under a pseudonym for the magazines Meşveret and Şûrâ-yı Ümmet, which were published in Paris, and Neyir-i Perakende, which was published in Manastır. After the re-declaration of the Constitutional Monarchy, he was appointed as a member of the Ottoman Senate on 27 December 1908. He held this role up until his death in 1915.

He had six children. His third child, diplomat Ahmet Naci, married British-born Olga Cynthia (whose name was changed to Nadide Kenter after she obtained Turkish citizenship). Yıldız Kenter and Müşfik Kenter were born from this marriage.

Galip Bey was admitted to the Macedonia Risorta lodge operating in Thessaloniki on 8 October 1908, and was a dedicated freemason.
