= Alfred-Müller-Felsenburg-Preis =

Prize

Alfred-Müller-Felsenburg-Preis is a prize awarded in recognition of critical literature writings, created by Hans-Werner Gey in 1988.

== Winners ==
Year	Recipitent	Notes
1988	Fritz Nagel
1989	Nevzat Yalçın
1990	Ilse Bintig
1991	Heinz Nattkämper
1992	Christof Wackernagel
1993	Saliha Scheinhardt
1994	Carlo Ross
1995	Mutter Marie Therese Linssen (Mechernich, postum)
1996	Michael Klaus
1997	Hans Steinacker (Witten)
1998	Stefanie Gercke (Hamburg)
1999	Vera Lebert-Hinze (Hilchenbach)
2000	Otti Pfeiffer and Arthur Japin
2001	Peter Schütze and Anna Maria Sigmand
2002	Edith Linvers and Martin Bormann
2003	Christoph Rösner and Liselotte Funcke
2004	Petra Holtmann and Horst Kniese
2005	Angelika Schröder and Hans Claßen
2006	Annette Gonserowski and Hermann Multhaupt
2007	Linde Rotta (Leipzig) and Alfred Müller-Felsenburg
2008	No price awarded because of Alfred Müller-Felsenburg's death
2009	Paul Alfred Kleinert (Berlin) and Sándor Tatár (Budapest)
2010	Horst W. Nägele (Dänemark)
2011	Martin Cern and Kirsten Niesler
2012	Thorsten Trelenberg
