= Drumroll (film) =

1993 film

- Film poster
- Directed by: Sergei Ovcharov
- Written by: Sergei Ovcharov
- Starring: Aleksandr Polovtsev
- Cinematography: Aleksandr Ustinov
- Release date: 12 February 1993 (Berlin)
- Running time: 97 minutes
- Country: Russia
- Language: Russian

Drumroll (Russian: Барабаниада) is a 1993 Russian comedy film directed by Sergei Ovcharov. It was entered into the 18th Moscow International Film Festival where it won the Special Silver St. George and the Prix of Ecumenical Jury. The picture also won the Special Jury Prize at Kinotavr.

== Plot ==
One winter, at a funeral the specter of one of the deceased presents a large drum of Stradivarius as a gift to a drummer playing in the ensemble. Over time the drum begins to behave as an independent creature, and the drummer can no longer part with it. Because of the nightly playing on the drum he is forced to leave the hostel where he lived and go on a journey.

Having crossed several borders of newly formed post-Soviet states, the drummer after contact with customs officers is left without property, with the exception of the drum. Noticing that at the subway many people give money to beggars he also starts to stand there with the drum, but all the money he earned is taken away by young people in athletic wear, and when they arrange a shootout, all the rest is taken by a policeman. The drummer goes to a diner although he has no money; The waitress mistakenly covers the drum with a tablecloth, as a result of which the food comes from other people's plates to the drummer. On the street, he notices a pie with the help of which he is enticed by a young woman who feeds the drummer and leaves him at home, and provides a mat to the drum next to the door.

The next day the drummer tries to compose music, but his mundane girlfriend is immersed in everyday life and arranges a washing machine inside the drum. He escapes from her and settles in a huge dumping ground where the homeless live. He lives right inside the drum. From time to time there are police raids in the dump, and once a delegation of French homeless comes accompanied by officials. The homeless of the two differing countries exchange wisdom, sit at a festive table and give each other presents. The drummer plays on his drum, and his black French colleague plays along with him. At parting, the man offers the drummer to visit him.

Soon the drummer is issued a foreign passport and he flies abroad. He returns with a large load of purchases, but he is robbed right at the airport. He again turns out to be homeless and sleeps on the street in winter. In a fit of anger he breaks the drum into small pieces.

The film ends with a mockumentary newsreel telling how ancient people made the first drums from dinosaur skins.

== Cast ==
- Aleksandr Polovtsev
- Andrey Urgant as Conductor at Funeral
- Viktor Semyonovsky (as V. Semyonovsky)
- S. Zharov
- S. Zapryagayev
- Yuri Kostygin (as Yu. Kostygin)
- Yuri Makarov
- Vladimir Maslov (as V. Maslov)
