= Ayşecik ve Sihirli Cüceler Rüyalar Ülkesinde =

- Directed by: Tunç Başaran
- Written by: Hamdi Değirmencioğlu
- Based on: The Wonderful Wizard of Oz by L. Frank Baum
- Produced by: Özdemir Birsel
- Starring: Zeynep Değirmencioğlu; Süleyman Turan; Metin Serezli; Suna Selen; Ali Şen; Cemal Konca
- Cinematography: Rafet Şiriner, Mustafa Yılmaz
- Music by: Torgut Ören
- Distributed by: Renkli
- Release date: 1971
- Running time: 100 minutes (bootleg copies run 88 minutes with an obvious break in the material)
- Country: Turkey
- Language: Turkish

Ayşecik ve Sihirli Cüceler Rüyalar Ülkesinde (Little Ayşe and the Magic Dwarfs in the Land of Dreams) is a 1971 film by Turkish film director Tunç Başaran, an uncredited and very close adaptation by Hamdi Değirmencioğlu of L. Frank Baum's 1900 novel The Wonderful Wizard of Oz. The film was produced by Özdemir Birsel for Hisar (Citadel) Film. It is one of nearly forty films featuring Zeynep Değirmencioğlu as Ayşecik, many of which, like this one, were uncredited adaptations of famous stories, for example, Sinderella Külkedisi (Cinderella) (Süreyya Duru, 1971), Hayat Sevince Güzel [literally, "Loving makes life beautiful"] (Pollyanna) (Temel Gürsu, 1971), and Pamuk Prenses ve 7 Cüceler (Snow White) (Ertem Göreç, 1970).

== Plot summary ==
A little girl named Ayşecik lives with her parents on a farm, where they often feed the chickens or harvest crops. One day, however, there is a terrible tornado. She rushes back to the house because her dog is locked inside. But at that moment, strong winds blow the cottage off its foundation and into the sky. When the house lands, she opens the front door and peeks outside. Given a protective kiss and a pair of silver shoes by the Northern Sorceress and promised aid by seven munchkins, she sets out to find the Great Wizard. Through the grasslands and forests, she encounters Korkuluk (the Scarecrow) and in the forest she meets Teneke Koruadam (the Tin Woodman), and Korkak Aslan (the Cowardly Lion). Keşkin Zeka demands that they kill the Wicked Witch (Kötü Cadı) of the South (Suna Selen) in order to receive their wishes. But Ayşecik and Korkak Aslan are imprisoned in the witch's jail-house after their friends are destroyed by her army of soldiers. Ayşecik comes into the jail-house, carrying a heavy, tin bucket but the sets it down as the wicked witch orders her to wash the floor. The girl trips over a string and her left shoe lands on the floor, the wicked witch picks up the shoe and teases Ayşecik. Ayesecik picks up her bucket of water and throws it at her, the witch screams as her servants run away but then she begins to tremble, then she finally evaporates into thin air. The witch's former subjects willingly restore Korkuluk and Teneke Koruadam. Back at the Emerald City, Keşkin Zeka admits to being a fraud, delivers trinkets to Ayşecik's friends, and accidentally leaves her behind in his balloon escape, so they set off on their journey again, meeting again the china dolls, the hammer-wielding cavemen (loosely based on Baum's Hammerheads) and then start to dance, then, after the Good Sorceress tells her how to use her shoes, Ayşecik bids farewell to her friends, taps her heels, and ends up home. Interestingly, for the first time in any adaptation of The Wizard of Oz, we see the reaction of the young heroine's friends after she leaves.

== Production ==
Zeynep Değirmencioğlu was 17 years old when she played Ayşecik, the same age as Judy Garland was when she played Dorothy in The Wizard of Oz (1939), which this film is based on. In the book, Dorothy is said to be between the ages of 10-12.

The name of the leading character was changed from Dorothy to Ayşecik. This was to capitalize and cash in on Değirmencioğlu's status in Turkish pop culture with her signature and title role of Ayşecik in the Ayşecik film franchise. Throughout her career, Değirmencioğlu was often type cast in this girl next door mold and often played the character of Ayşecik in different prototypes.

Ayşe's dogs name is Boncuk (changed from Toto), which is a very common name for pets in Turkey. The name itself means "bead" in Turkish. Over the years, English speaking audiences misinterpreted his name as "Banju".

== See also ==
- The Wizard of Oz adaptations
