= Yıldız Kenter =

Turkish actress and lecturer (1928–2019)

- Born: Ayşe Yıldız Kenter; 11 October 1928; Istanbul, Turkey
- Died: 17 November 2019 (aged 91); Istanbul, Turkey
- Resting place: Aşiyan Asri Cemetery
- Education: Ankara State Conservatory
- Occupation: Actress
- Years active: 1949–2019
- Spouses: Nihat Akçan (m. 1951; div. 1958) Şükran Güngör (m. 1965; died 2002)
- Children: 1
- Relatives: Müşfik Kenter (brother); Ali Mahmut Kenter; Selma Kenter

Ayşe Yıldız Kenter (11 October 1928 – 17 November 2019) was a Turkish actress and lecturer who was of English descent from her maternal side. Kenter was also a UNICEF Goodwill Ambassador.

== Early years ==
Ayşe Yıldız Kenter was born to diplomat Ahmet Naci Kenter and his wife Nadide, née Olga Cynthia, in Istanbul on 11 October 1928. Her mother was naturalized after her marriage to Ahmet Naci and moved to Turkey, changing her given name to Nadide. Kenter's paternal grandfather was Mehmet Galip Bey.

== Acting career ==
Kenter graduated from Ankara State Conservatory. She worked for eleven years at the Ankara State Theatre. She obtained a fellowship from the Rockefeller Foundation, and went to the United States, where she attended American Theatre Wing, Neighborhood Playhouse School of the Theatre and Actors Studio to study advanced drama education. After returning home, she was appointed instructor at the Ankara State Conservatory. On 1959, she resigned from her post at the State Theatre.

After working one year with Muhsin Ertuğrul, she co-founded the "Kent Theatre Company" with her brother Müşfik Kenter and husband Şükran Güngör. In later years, she conducted studies on "Changing Education Methods" and "Acting Methods" in the U.S. and United Kingdom.

The construction of the Kenter Theatre building in Istanbul was completed in 1968. She played in English and Turkish language in the Soviet Union, United States, United Kingdom, Germany, the Netherlands, Denmark, Canada, Yugoslavia and Cyprus.

She staged and played more than hundred works of foreign playwrights such as Shakespeare, Chekhov, Brecht, Ionesco, Pinter, Albee, Tennessee Williams, Alan Ayckbourn, Arthur Miller, Brian Friel, Neil Simon, Athol Fugard, Sergei Kokovkin and also of Turkish dramatists like Melih Cevdet Anday, Necati Cumalı, Güner Sümer, Adalet Ağaoğlu, Zeki Özturanlı, Güngör Dilmen, Muzaffer İzgü.

She served 37 years as a professor of stage acting.

== Personal life ==
In 1951, Yıldız Kenter married Nihat Akçan, the brother of singer Nesrin Sipahi. A year later, she gave birth to a daughter. This marriage lasted seven years. Her second marriage in 1965 was to Şükran Güngör who died in 2002.

Yıldız Kenter died at the age of 91 on 17 November 2019 in intensive care, at a private hospital in Istanbul. She was interred at the Aşiyan Asri Cemetery following a memorial ceremony held at the Kenter Theatre and the religious funeral service at Afet Yolal Mosque in Levent. She is survived by her two daughters.

== Awards and honors ==
On 1962, Kenter was honored with the "Woman of the Year Award" for her service in theatre. She received three times the Golden Orange Award for "Best Supporting Actress". In 1984, the Italian Cultural Institute in Rome awarded her the "Adelaide Ristori Prize". For her role in the Turkish drama movie Hanım, she received the "Best Actress Award" at the "1989 Bastia Film Festival" in Corsica. The Lions Clubs International honored her in 1991 for her service to theatre art with the "Melvin Jones Award". She received twice the "Ulvi Uraz Best Actress Award" and three times the " Avni Dilligil Award" in the same category. The 1World Women Organization of Finland" named her one of the "Most Successful 100 Women of the Century". In 1995, Kenter was awarded the "Honor" title by the Ministry of Culture for her contribution to the theatre art. The same year, she received the "Brotherhood and Peace Award of Mevlana". In 1996, the "Tabloid Journalists Association" (Turkish: Magazin Gazetecikeri Derneği) awarded her the "Best Actress Prize" for her role as "Jülide" in the theatre play "Ramiz ile Jülide" ("Ramiz and Jülide"). She received the "Lifelong Achievement in Theatre Award" of the International Istanbul Festival in 1997, bestowed by Dame Diana Rigg. In 1998, she was named the "Best Actress of the Year" by Ankara Culture Society, she received the "Lifelong Achievement in Theatre Prize of Muhsin Ertuğrul" and she was honored with the "Presidential Grand Culture and Arts Award". The next year, she received the "Best Actress Prize" of "Afife Jale Drama Awards" for her role as Madame Arcadina in The Seagull.

== Filmography ==
Television
Year	Title	Role	Notes
1987-1991	Uğurlugiller	Nebahat Uğurlugil	Leading Role
1993-1996	Yaz Evi	Selma	Leading Role
2002	Aşk ve Gurur	Süreyya Hanım	Leading Role
2004	Pako'ya Mektuplar		Guest
2005	Saklambaç	Meliha Hanım	Supporting Role
2007	Kısmetim Otel	Nebile Kısmetim	Leading Role
Cinema
Year	Title	Role	Notes
1951	Vatan İçin	Büyükanne	Supporting Role
1964	Ağaçlar Ayakta Ölür	Büyükanne	Leading Role
1966	İsyancılar		Leading Role
1966	Pembe Kadın	Pembe	Leading Role
1967	Yaşlı Gözler	Ümran	Leading Role
1971	Anneler ve Kızları	Fatma	Leading Role
1971	Elmacı Kadın	Fatma/Gündoğdu Bacı	Leading Role
1972	Fatma Bacı	Fatma Bacı	Leading Role
1973	Ablam		Leading Role
1974	Bir Ana Bir Kız	Zeynep	Leading Role
1974	Kartal Yuvası	Makbule	Leading Role
1974	Kızım Ayşe	Huriye Bacı	Leading Role
1983	Zulüm	Ayşe	Leading Role
1989	Hanım	Olcay Hanım	Leading Role
2000	Güle Güle	Zarife	Leading Role
2001	Büyük Adam Küçük Aşk	Müzeyyen Hanım	Leading Role
2005	Sen Ne Dilersen	Dadı Mimi	Leading Role
2007	Beyaz Melek	Melek	Leading Role

Awards
Preceded by established	Golden Orange Award for Best Supporting Actress; 1964 for Ağaçlar Ayakta Ölür	Succeeded by Aliye Rona
Preceded by Aliye Rona	Golden Orange Award for Best Supporting Actress; 1966 for İsyancılar	Succeeded by Aliye Rona
Preceded by Semra Sar	Golden Orange Award for Best Supporting Actress; 1974 for Kızım Ayşe	Succeeded by Seden Kızıltunç
