= Whatever You Wish =

Sen Ne Dilersen
- DVD cover
- Directed by: Cem Başeskioğlu
- Written by: Cem Başeskioğlu
- Produced by: Kara Film
- Starring: Işık Yenersu; Işın Karaca; Fikret Kuşkan; Yıldız Kenter
- Cinematography: Gökhan Atılmış
- Music by: Cafer İşleyen; Selim Bölükbaşı
- Release date: 2005
- Running time: 93 minutes
- Country: Turkey
- Languages: Turkish some Greek

Sen Ne Dilersen (International English title:Whatever You Wish) is a drama movie directed by Cem Başekioğlu. It was the director's debut full-length movie, as well as Işın Karaca's debut leading role, a Turkish pop singer. Famous actors like Fikret Kuşkan and Yıldız Kenter starred in the film. Leading lady "Eleni" who is portrayed by Işık Yenersu, a well-known actress in Turkey, has cancer in the film. Işık Yenersu has also suffered from cancer in real life during the production of the film.

The movie tells a thirty-year story of a Greek family who lives in Turkey.

== Cast ==
- Işık Yenersu (Eleni)
- Fikret Kuşkan (Musa)
- Işın Karaca (Marika)
- Zeynep Eronat (Eftimiya)
- Yıldız Kenter (Mimi)
- Güler Ökten (Anastasia)
- Ahmet Mümtaz Taylan (Zülfikar)
- Haldun Boysan (Rıfkı)
- Okan Yalabık (Stavro)
- Ayçin İnci (Rosa's daughter)
- Begüm Birgören (young Eleni)
- Evrim Solmaz (young Eftimiya)
- Ali Taygun (Apostos)
- Hasan Yalnızoğlu (angel)
- Asuman Krause (angel)

Other (uncredited):

- Aytaç Arman
- Anta Toros (Rosa)
- Cem Özer
- Leman Çıdamlı
- Ebru Karanfilci (Sümbül)
- Ayşin Zeren (angel)
- Yakup Yavru (doctor)
- Özden Özgürdal (verger)
- Ayşe Merve

== Awards ==
Year	Award ceremony	Category	Winner
2006	Adana Altın Koza Film Festival	Best Supporting Actress	Zeynep Eronat
2006	Ankara International Film Festival	Best Supporting Actress	Zeynep Eronat
2006	Ankara International Film Festival	New hoping writer	Cem Başeskioğlu
