= Müşfik Kenter =

Turkish stage and voice actor (1932-2012)

- Born: 8 September 1932; Istanbul, Turkey
- Died: 15 August 2012 (aged 79); Istanbul, Turkey
- Education: Ankara State Conservatory
- Occupations: Actor, voice-over artist
- Years active: 1960–2012
- Spouse(s): Oya Kenter (?–1963); Esin Şerbetçi (1963–?); Mehlika Kenter; Gülsüm Kamu; Kadriye Demirel (1976–2012)
- Children: 4
- Relatives: Yıldız Kenter (sister); Ali Mahmut Kenter (brother); Selma Kenter (sister)

Müşfik Galip Kenter (9 September 1932 – 15 August 2012) was a Turkish theatre and voice actor. He was of English descent from his maternal side.

== Biography ==
Müşfik Kenter was born to diplomat Ahmet Naci Kenter and his wife Nadide, née Olga Cynthia, in Istanbul on 11 October 1928. His mother was naturalized after her marriage to Ahmet Naci and moved to Turkey, changing her given name to Nadide. Kenter's paternal grandfather was Mehmet Galip Bey.

On 14 August 2012, local news outlets reported that Kenter had been admitted to the intensive care unit at F.N. Hospital and diagnosed with pulmonary infection due to lung cancer. On the same day, the assertions were denied by Kenter's wife, Kadriye Kenter (née Demirel), who said that he was having routine checkups.

He died on 15 August 2012 at the age of 79 in Istanbul. In further reports, it was revealed that he had been diagnosed with cancer in early June 2012. This followed the death of his disabled son Mahmut, a son from his first marriage with Esin Şerbetçi, who died at the age of 46 on 27 May 2012 due to respiratory problems.

== Filmography ==
Year	Original Title	Role	Notes
1960	Dişi Kurt		
1961	Sessiz harp		
1964	Dişi Örümcek		
1965	Murtaza		
1965	Şeytanın Kurbanları		
1965	Sevmek Zamanı		
1966	Bozuk Düzen		Awarded Best Supporting Actor at 3rd Antalya Golden Orange Film Festival
1966	O Kadın		
1971	Üç Arkadaş		
1982	Seni Kalbime Gömdüm		
1987	Hayallerim ve Aşkım		
1987	Rumuz Goncagül		
1990	Piano Piano Bacaksız		Narrator
1991	Lebewohl, Fremde	Deniz	German production, directed by Tevfik Başer
1994	Moon Time		
2000	Dar Alanda Kısa Paslaşmalar		English title: Offside
2007	Amerikalılar Karadeniz'de 2		
