= Cem Özer =

Turkish actor

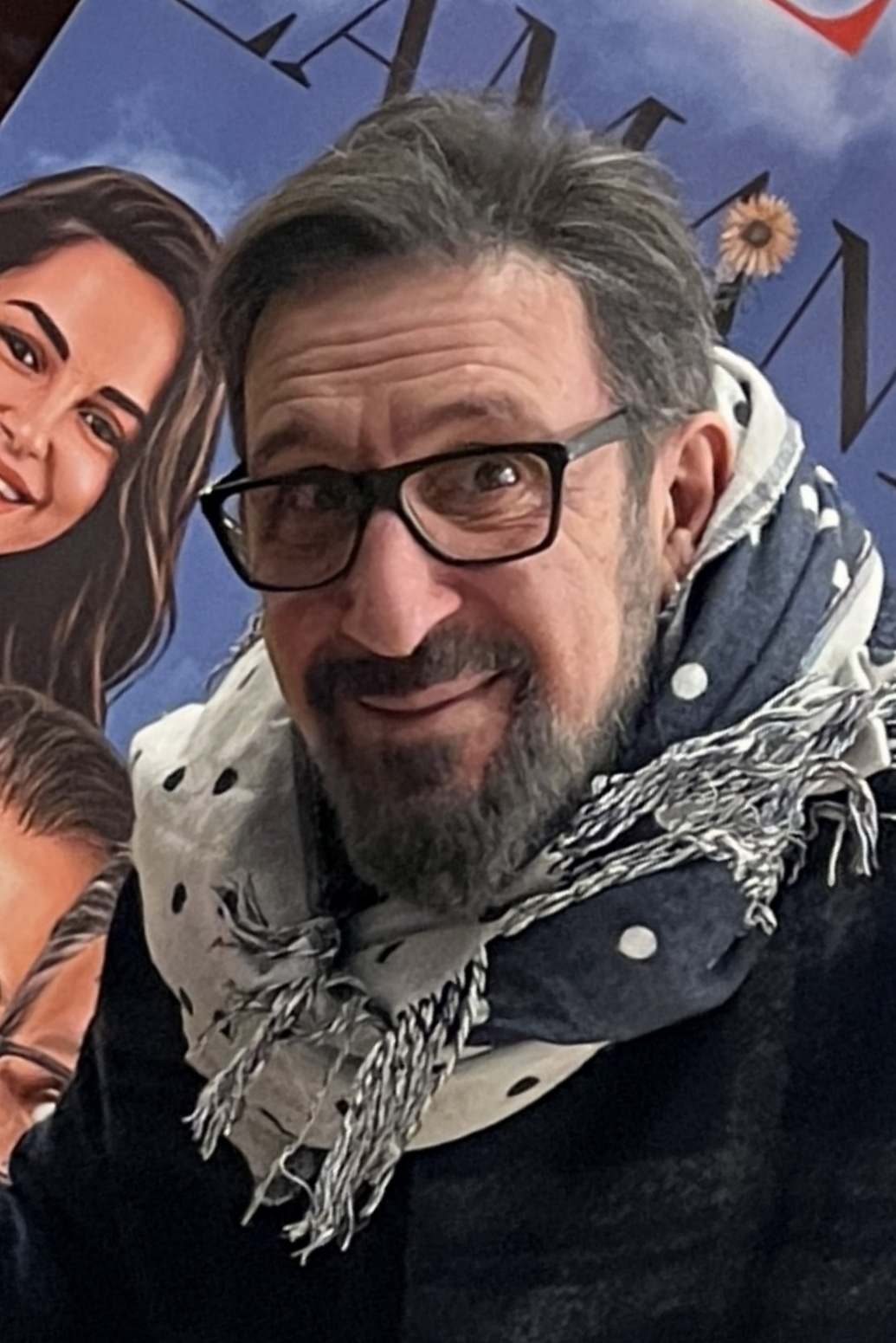
- Born: 5 October 1959 (age 66); Istanbul, Turkey
- Occupation: Actor
- Years active: 1976–present
- Spouses: Sebla Pekcan (m. 1984–1989) Selin Dilmen (m. 1989–1991) Esin Maraşlıoğlu (m. 1994–1999) Nurgül Yeşilçay (m. 2004–2010) Pınar Dura (m. 2017)
- Children: 2

Cem Özer (born 5 October 1959) is a Turkish actor. He appeared in more than thirty films since 1976.

== Books ==
- Yastıkaltı Hikayeleri, Neden Kitap Publishing, (ISBN 975-254-057-0)
- A! Cem'i Yazılar, Parantez Publishing, March 1997, (ISBN 975-7939-42-0)
- Yirmidört Saat (Film scenario), 1976

== Filmography ==
- O Hayat Benim – (2016–2017) – Kenan
- Sen Benimsin – 2015 – Kudret
- Buyur Burdan Kaç – 2013 – Istanbul Theater "director"
- Acayip Hikayeler – 2012
- Kadri'nin Götürdüğü Yere Git – 2009
- Sıcak – 2008
- Adem'in Trenleri – 2007
- Bir İhtimal Daha Var – 2006
- Sen Ne Dilersen – 2005
- Masum Değiliz – 2005
- 3. Tür – 2004
- Melekler Adası – 2004
- Neredesin Firuze – 2003
- Şıh Senem – 2003
- 90-60-90 – 2001
- Ölüm Peşimizde – 2000
- Aşkın Dağlarda Gezer – 1999
- Asansör – 1999
- Karışık Pizza – 1998
- Usta Beni Öldürsene – 1996
- Berlin in Berlin – 1993
- Varyemez – 1991
- Anılar – 1989
- Zirvenin Bedeli – 1989
- Hanım – 1988
- Umutların Ötesi – 1988
- Vurmayın – 1987
- Menekşeler Mavidir – 1987
- Güldürme Beni – 1986
- Dayak Cennetten Çıkma – 1986
- Hababam Sınıfı Güle Güle - 1981
- Yirmidört Saat – 1976
