= The Bloody Money =

- Directed by: Orhon M. Arıburnu
- Written by: Orhon M. Arıburnu; Safa Önal
- Produced by: Naci Duru
- Cinematography: Turgud Ören
- Production company: Duru Film
- Release date: 12 March 1953
- Country: Turkey
- Language: Turkish

The Bloody Money (Turkish: Kanlı Para) is a 1953 Turkish adventure film directed by Orhon M. Ariburnu and starring Ayhan Isik and Nedret Güvenç.

== Cast ==
- Ayhan Isik
- Nedret Güvenç
- Orhon M. Ariburnu
- Aliye Rona
- Lale Oraloglu
- Refik Kemal Arduman
- Tevhid Bilge
- Adil Güldürür
- Hüseyin Kemal Gürmen
- Muharrem Gürses
- Atif Kaptan
- Sadri Karan
- Mücap Ofluoglu
- Necmi Oy
- Salih Tozan
- Kadri Ögelman

== Bibliography ==
- Giovanni Scognamillo & Metin Demirhan. Fantastik Türk sineması. Kabalcı Yayınevi, 1999.
