= Aliye Rona =

Turkish actress (1921–1996)

- Born: Aliye Dilligil; 14 October 1920; Daraa, French Mandate for Syria and the Lebanon
- Died: 27 August 1996 (aged 75); Istanbul, Turkey
- Occupation: Actress
- Years active: 1936–1996
- Spouse: Zihni Rona

Aliye Rona (née Dilligil; 14 October 1920 – 27 August 1996) was a Turkish film actress starring in more than 130 movies, mostly of drama and romance genre, from 1947 until her death.

She was born in Daraa, French Mandate for Syria and the Lebanon (today southwestern Syria). After acting in theater, she transferred to cinema in 1947.

Aliye Rona, who was sister of Avni Dilligil, actor, screenwriter and film director, and had a marriage with the actor Zihni Rona, died on 29 August 1996 in Istanbul.

== Filmography ==
- Acı Zafer (1996) (The Bitter Glory)
- Berlin in Berlin (1993)
- Üçüncü Göz (1988) (The Third Eye)
- Alın Yazım (1986) (My Destiny)
- Keriz (1985) (The Simpleton)
- Parmak Damgasi (1985) TV mini-series (The Fingerprint)
- Şabaniye (1984) .... Hatice
- Su (1981) (Water)
- Yılani Öldürseler (1981) .... The grandmother (Killing The Snake)
- Garibin Çilesi Ölünce Biter (1979) (Suffering Of The Poor Ends With Death)
- Kılıç Bey (1978)
- Tatli Nigar (1978)
- Şıpsevdi (1977) (mini) TV mini-series (The Susceptible)
- Kara Çarsaflı Gelin (1975) .... Zara (The Dark-Veiled Bride)
- Kuma (1974) .... Ali's mother (The Fellow Wife)
- Sokaklardan Bir Kız (1974)
- Dikiz Aynası (1973)
- Ablam (1973) ... a.k.a. My Older Sister (International: English title: literal title)
- Gelin (1973) .... Veli's mother ... a.k.a. The Bride
- Bir Garip Yolcu (1972) .... Murat's mother ... a.k.a. A Strange Passenger (International: English title: literal title)
- Cemo (1972)
- Hazreti Ibrahim (1972)
- Kadersizler (1972)
- Ustura Behçet (1972)
- Ankara Ekspresi (1971)
- Çirkin ve Cesur (1971)
- Gelin Kız (1971)
- Hasret (1971)
- Öldüren Şehir (1971)... a.k.a. The Fatal City (International: English title: literal title)
- Sezercik Yavrum Benim (1971)
- Tanrı Şahidimdir (1971)
- Üvey Ana (1971) ... a.k.a. The Stepmother (International: English title: literal title)
- Adım Kan Soyadım Silah (1970)
- Bülbül Yuvası (1970)
- Hippi Perihan (1970)
- Kader Bağlayınca (1970)
- Meçhul Kadın (1970)
- Yaban Gülü (1970)
- Zeyno (1970) .... Hatçe
- Alageyik (1969)
- Anadolu Soygunu (1969)
- Ask Mabudesi (1969)
- Bataklı Damin Kızı Aysel (1969)
- Bir Şarkısın Sen (1969)
- Boş Beşik (1969)
- Buruk Acı (1969) .... Fehiman Burgaç
- Çakircalı Mehmet Efe (1969)
- Ebu Müslim Horasani (1969)
- Iki Günahsiz Kız: İki Hikayeli Film (1969)
- Kanlı Aşk (1969)
- Kapicinin Kızı (1969)
- Sana Dönmeyeceğim (1969)
- Yalniz Adam (1969)
- Aci Yıllar (1968)
- Affet Beni Allahım (1968)
- Çatallı Köy (1968)
- Derebeyi (1968)
- Eşkiya Halil (1968)
- Kader Böyle İstedi (1968)
- Kanun Namına (1968)
- Kezban (1968)
- Kinali Yapıncak (1968)
- Kuyu (1968)
- Talihsiz Meryem (1968)
- Allah'a Adanan Toprak (1967)
- Azap Yolu (1967)
- Dokuzuncu Hariciye Koğuşu (1967) ... a.k.a. Ninth External Ward (International: English title)
- Dördü de Seviyordu (1967)
- Kanunsuz Toprak (1967)
- Kara Duvaklı Gelin (1967)
- Kelepçeli Melek (1967)
- Mühür Gözlüm (1967)
- The Road That Has No End (1967) ... a.k.a. Bitmeyen Yol (Turkey: Turkish title)
- Son Gece (1967)
- Şoförün Kızı (1966) ... a.k.a. The Driver's Daughter (International: English title)
- Anadolu Kanunu (1966) ... a.k.a. Anatolian Law (International: English title)
- Analarin Günahi (1966)
- Çalıkuşu (1966) ... a.k.a. Firecrest (UK: literal English title)
- Garibim Çalıkuşu (1966)
- Kucaktan Kucağa (1966)
- Nikahsizlar (1966)
- Zalimler (1966)
- Veda Busesi (1965) ... a.k.a. Farewell Kiss (International: English title)
- Hepimiz Kardeşiz (1965)
- Akrep Kuyruğu (1965) ... a.k.a. The Tail of the Scorpion (International: English title)
- Garip Bir İzdivaç (1965) ... a.k.a. A Strange Wedding (International: English title)
- Konuşan Gözler (1965)
- Korkusuzlar (1965/I) ... a.k.a. The Fearless Ones (International: English title)
- Muradın Türküsü (1965)
- Son Kuşlar (1965) ... a.k.a. The Last Birds (International: English title)
- Üçünüzü de Mıhlarım (1965)
- Uzakta Kal Sevgilim (1965)
- Yasak Cennet (1965) ... a.k.a. Forbidden Heaven (International: English title)
- Yıldızların Altında (1965) ... a.k.a. Under the Stars (International: English title)
- Yıldız Tepe (1965)
- Uçurumdaki Kadın (1964)
- Mualla (1964)
- Dullar Tercih Edilir (1964)
- Erkekler ağlamaz (1964) ... a.k.a. Men Don't Cry (International: English title)
- Lekeli Aşk (1964)
- Mor Defter (1964) ... a.k.a. The Purple Notebook (International: English title)
- Plajda Sevişelim (1964)
- Poyraz Osman (1964)
- Şeytanın Uşaklari (1964) ... a.k.a. Devil's Servants (International: English title)
- Yüz Karası (1964)
- Kiralık Koca (1963)
- Ask Tomurcukları (1963) ... a.k.a. The Love Buds (International: English title)
- Büyük Yemin (1963) ... a.k.a. The Big Oath (International: English title)
- CilalI Ibo Kızlar Pansiyonunda (1963)
- Allah Seviniz Dedi (1962)
- Yılanların Öcü (1962) .... Irazca ... a.k.a. Revenge of the Snakes (International: English title)
- Beş Kardeştiler (1962)
- Mağrur Kadın (1962) ... a.k.a. The Arrogant Woman (International: English title)
- Küçük Hanımefendi (1961)
- Aşkın Saatı Gelince (1961)
- Liman Yosmasi (1961) ... a.k.a. The Harbour Coquette (International: English title)
- Seni Kaybedersem (1961) ... a.k.a. If I Lose You... (International: English title)
- Ayşecik - Şeytan Çekici (1960) ... a.k.a. Aysecik: Bright Kid (UK: literal English title)
- Kırık Kalpler (1960) ... a.k.a. The Broken Hearts (International: English title)
- Serseri (1959) ... a.k.a. The Vagabond (International: English title)
- Fakir Kızın Kısmeti (1956)
- Bozkurt Obasi (1954)
- Kanlı Para (1953) ... a.k.a. The Bloody Money (International: English title)
- Köroğlu-Türkan Sultan (1953)
- Mahallenin Namusu (1953)
- Efelerin Efesi (1952)
- Bergama Sevdaları (1952)
- Kanlı Çiftlik (1952) ... a.k.a. The Bloody Farm (International: English title)
- Kanlı Döşek (1949) ... a.k.a. The Bloody Bed (International: English title)
- Şehitler Kalesi (1949) ... a.k.a. The Castle of the Martyrs (International: English title)
- Zehirli Şüphe (1949)
- Silik Çehreler (1948) ... a.k.a. The Dim Faces (International: English title)
- Kerim 'in Çilesi (1947)

Awards
| Preceded by Yıldız Kenter | Golden Orange Award for Best Supporting Actress; 1965 for Hepimiz Kardeşiz | Succeeded by Yıldız Kenter |
| Preceded by Yıldız Kenter | Golden Orange Award for Best Supporting Actress; 1967 for Zalimler; 1968 for Son Gece | Succeeded by Muazzez Arçay |
