= 18th Moscow International Film Festival =

Film festival

- Location: Moscow, Russia
- Founded: 1959
- Awards: Grand Prix
- Festival date: 1–12 July 1993
- Website: Website

The 18th Moscow International Film Festival was held from 1 to 12 July 1993. The Golden St. George was awarded to the French-Belarusian film Me Ivan, You Abraham directed by Yolande Zauberman.

== Jury ==
- Claude Lelouch (France – President of the Jury)
- Gila Almagor (Israel)
- Jacek Bromski (Poland)
- Pavel Lungin (Russia)
- Tilda Swinton (Great Britain)

== Films in competition ==
The following films were selected for the main competition:

English title	Original title	Director(s)	Production country
Drumroll	Barabaniada	Sergei Ovcharov	Russia, France
Berlin in Berlin	Berlin in Berlin	Sinan Çetin	Turkey, Germany
Gangsters	Gangsters	Massimo Guglielmi	Italy
The Voice in the Wilderness	Dzayn barbaro...	Vigen Chaldranyan	Armenia
Grandpa Ge	Grandpa Ge	Gang Han	China
Children of Iron Gods	Deti chugunnykh bogov	Tamás Tóth	Russia
Jonah Who Lived in the Whale	Jona che visse nella balena	Roberto Faenza	Italy, France
Bat Wings	Flaggermusvinger	Emil Stang Lund	Norway
The Inheritance or Fuckoffguysgoodday	Dědictví aneb Kurvahošigutntag	Věra Chytilová	Czech Republic
Les Pots cassés	Les Pots cassés	François Bouvier	Canada
Fathers & Sons	Fathers & Sons	Paul Mones	United States
Ripa Hits the Skids	Ripa ruostuu	Christian Lindblad	Finland, Germany
Roja	Roja	Mani Ratnam	India
Absent Without Leave	Absent Without Leave	John Laing	New Zealand
Stalingrad	Stalingrad	Joseph Vilsmaier	Germany, Sweden
Shadows in a Conflict	Sombras en una batalla	Mario Camus	Spain
The Three Best Things in Life	De drie beste dingen in het leven	Ger Poppelaars	Netherlands
A Bachelor's Life Abroad	Kawalerskie życie na obczyźnie	Andrzej Barański	Poland
Cronos	Cronos	Guillermo del Toro	Mexico
Chaplin	Chaplin	Richard Attenborough	Great Britain, United States
I Will Survive	Saleolilatda	Sam-yuk Yoon	South Korea
Me Ivan, You Abraham	Moi ivan, toi Abraham	Yolande Zauberman	France, Belarus

== Awards ==
- Golden St. George: Me Ivan, You Abraham by Yolande Zauberman
- Special Silver St. George: Drumroll by Sergei Ovcharov
- Prizes:
  - Best Actor: Lee Deok-hwa for I Will Survive
  - Best Actress: Hülya Avşar for Berlin in Berlin
- Diploma for the Direction: Emil Stang Lund for Bat Wings
- Diploma for the Script: Gilles Desjardins for Les Pots cassés
- Prix of Ecumenical Jury:
  - Drumroll by Sergei Ovcharov
  - Jonah Who Lived in the Whale by Roberto Faenza
