= Adam and the Devil =

2007 film

- Directed by: Barış Pirhasan
- Starring: Nurgül Yeşilçay; Cem Özer
- Release date: 2 March 2007
- Running time: 100 minutes
- Country: Turkey
- Language: Turkish

Adam and the Devil (Turkish: Adem'in Trenleri) is a 2007 Turkish drama film directed by Barış Pirhasan.

== Cast ==
- Nurgül Yeşilçay - Hacer
- Cem Özer - Hasan Hoca
- Derya Alabora - Sükran
- Asuman Dabak - Münevver
- Hakan Bilgin - Resat
- Ümit Çırak - Musa
