= Lebewohl, Fremde =

1991 film

- Directed by: Tevfik Başer
- Written by: Tevfik Başer
- Produced by: Tevfik Başer
- Starring: Grażyna Szapołowska; Müşfik Kenter
- Cinematography: Hans-Günther Bücking
- Edited by: Helga Borsche
- Release date: May 1991
- Running time: 100 minutes
- Country: Germany
- Language: German

Lebewohl, Fremde is a 1991 German drama film directed by Tevfik Başer. It was screened in the Un Certain Regard section at the 1991 Cannes Film Festival.

== Cast ==
- Grażyna Szapołowska as Karin
- Müşfik Kenter as Deniz
- Gustav-Peter Wöhler as Claus
- Badi Uzzaman as Badi
- Ayub Khan Din as Sehrat
- Werner Eichhorn as Bischoff
- Charlie Rinn as Löffelholz
- Uta Prelle as Tochter von Löffelholz
- Julia Lindig as Kellnerin
- Achim Schülke as Pastor Abdoulaye
- Abdoulaye Diop as Afrikaner
- Dieter Ohlendiek as Kommissar
- Dagmar Cassens as Kassiererin
- Szoka Duzar as Frau von Deniz
