= Farewell to False Paradise =

1989 film

- Directed by: Tevfik Başer
- Written by: Tevfik Başer; Cornelius Bischoff
- Based on: Abschied vom falschen Paradies by Saliha Scheinhardt
- Produced by: Ottokar Runze
- Starring: Zuhal Olcay; Ruth Olafsdottir
- Cinematography: Izzet Akay
- Edited by: Renate Merck
- Music by: Claus Bantzer
- Distributed by: Pari Films
- Release dates: 11 May 1989 (West Germany); 7 March 1990 (France)
- Running time: 92 minutes
- Country: West Germany
- Language: German

Farewell to False Paradise (German: Abschied vom falschen Paradies) is a 1989 German drama film, directed by Tevfik Başer. The film won one award and was nominated for another at the 1989 German Film Awards.

== Plot ==
Elif, the widow of a Turkish migrant worker in Germany, has been sentenced to six years in prison for killing her husband. She is sent to a prison in Hamburg which at first serves as a dark setting of claustrophobia, punishment, and isolation. Her perception then changes as she encounters female solidarity which contrasts with her previous domestic life under patriarchal restrictions as a Muslim-Turkish wife. Having escaped her restrictive life by killing her husband, Elif begins to view the prison as a kind of paradise where she is able to develop a new female identity. While imprisoned, she learns to speak German, cuts her long hair, sheds her traditional headscarf, and gradually adopts the style of a Westernized woman who wears jeans and sneakers. As time goes on, Elif’s prison sentence gets reduced on account of good behavior and she is set to be released. She fears that she will be sent back to Turkey for another murder trial or may get killed by her brother-in-law for revenge, so she attempts to commit suicide.

== Cast ==
- Zuhal Olcay as Elif
- Brigitte Janner as Marianne
- Ruth Olafsdottir as Gabriella
- Barbara Morawiecz as Nora
- Eva-Maria Kurz as Anna
- Celik Bilge as Elif's brother

== Awards ==
At the 1989 German Film Awards, the film won the Film Award in Gold for Outstanding Achievement, which went Zuhal Olcay. The film was also nominated for Outstanding Feature Film.
