= Nurgül Yeşilçay =

Turkish actress

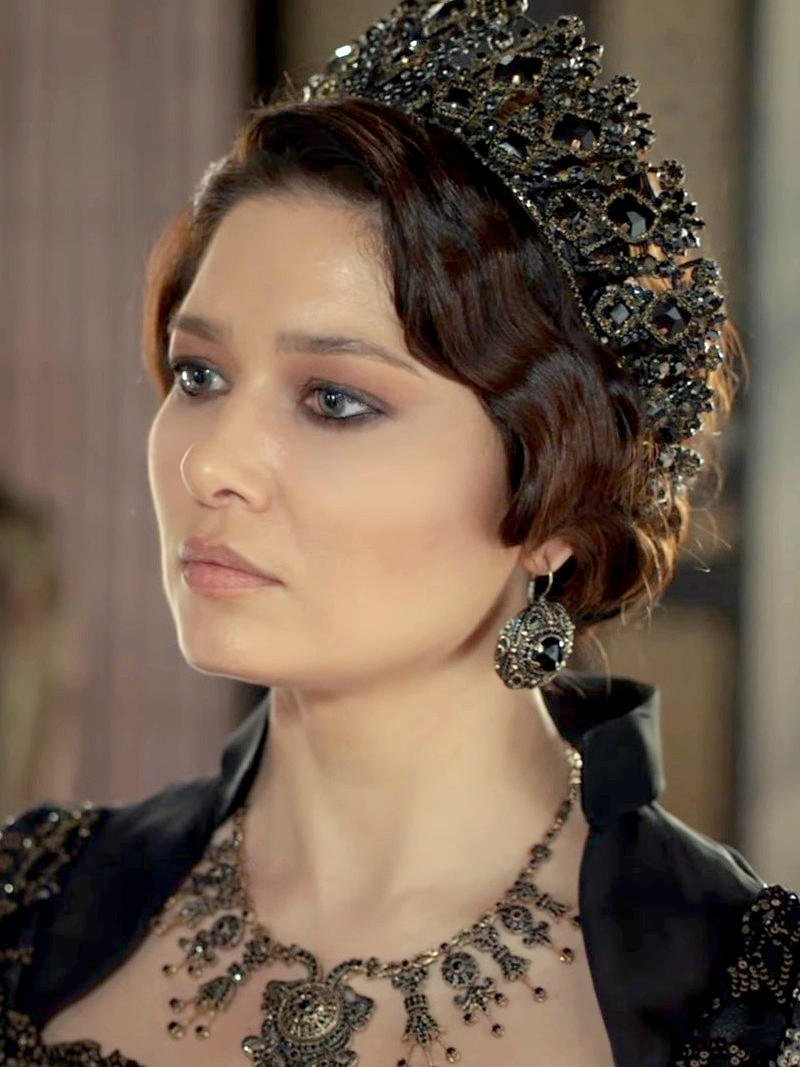
- Yeşilçay as Kösem Sultan in Muhteşem Yüzyıl: Kösem (2017)
- Born: 26 March 1976 (age 50); Afyonkarahisar, Turkey
- Education: Drama
- Alma mater: Anadolu University
- Occupation: Actress
- Years active: 1995–present
- Spouse: Cem Özer (m. 2004; div. 2010)
- Children: 1
- Awards: Golden Boll Award for Best Actress (2005); Golden Orange Award for Best Actress (2008); Distinctive International Arab Festivals Awards (2017)

Nurgül Yeşilçay (born 26 March 1976) is a Turkish actress.

== Biography ==
Nurgül Yeşilçay was born in Afyonkarahisar in 1976. She studied drama at the State Conservatoire of Anadolu University in Eskişehir. Since her graduation, she has performed several major roles for the stage, including Ophelia in Hamlet and Blanche DuBois in A Streetcar Named Desire.

Theatre aside, Yeşilçay rose to prominence as the lead in, among others, three record-breaking Turkish television dramas. She worked her first role with veteran actors Şener Şen, Türkan Şoray in İkinci Bahar. Her film Edge of Heaven won the prize for best screenplay at the 60th Cannes Film Festival in 2007. She won the "Best Actress" award at the 45th Antalya Golden Orange Film Festival with the film Vicdan. Also, she had hit comedy roles including 7 Kocalı Hürmüz, Belalı Baldız, Mahalleden Arkadaşlar, İşler Güçler.

== Filmography ==
Films
Year	Title	Role	Notes
1998	Herşey Çok Güzel Olacak	Nurse	Her first cinematic role
2001	Şellale	Nergis	
2002	Mumya Firarda	Fatıma	
2003	Asmalı Konak: Hayat	Bahar Karadağ	
2004	Anlat İstanbul	Uyuyan Güzel Saliha	
2005	Eğreti Gelin	Kostak Emine	
2007	Adem'in Trenleri	Hacer	
2007	The Edge of Heaven	Ayten Öztürk	
2008	Vicdan	Aydanur	
2009	7 Kocalı Hürmüz	Hürmüz	
2011	Çınar Ağacı	Sonay	
2013	Aşk Kırmızı	Nazlıgül	
2013	Şanzelize Hırsızı	Nadya	Short film
2014	Gece	Süsen	
2014	Pek Yakında	Nurse	
2015	Köstebekgiller: Perili Orman	Köstepem	Voice
2016	İkinci Şans	Yasemin	
2022	Kim Bu Aile?	Menekşe	
2022	Mahalleden Arkadaşlar	İlknur	
Web series
Year	Title	Role	Notes
2021	Vahşi Şeyler	Şule	Leading role
Television series
Year	Title	Role	Notes
1998–2001	İkinci Bahar	Gülsüm Percons Meriç	Her first TV role
2001	90-60-90	Deniz	
2002–2003	Asmalı Konak	Bahar Karadağ	
1995–2007	Reyting Hamdi	Nurgül	Guest
2004–2005	Melekler Adası	Şerbet, Ayşe	
2005–2006	Belalı Baldız	Arzu Parlak	
2006–2008	Ezo Gelin	Ezo Gündoğdu	
2010–2011	Aşk ve Ceza	Yasemin	
2011–2012	Sensiz Olmaz	Feryal	
2012	Sultan	Sultan	
2013	İşler Güçler	Nurgül Yeşilçay	Guest
2013	Galip Derviş	Şeyda Sönmez	Guest
2013	Bebek İşi	Candan (Anne)	Leading role
2014	Cinayet	Zehra Kaya	Leading role
2014–2016	Paramparça	Gülseren Gürpınar	Leading role
2016–2017	Muhteşem Yüzyıl: Kösem	Kösem Sultan	Leading role
2018–2019	Gülperi	Gülperi Çetin	Leading role
2020–2021	Kefaret	Zeynep Gökmen	Leading role
2022	Son Nefesime Kadar	Mihri Özbayden	Leading role
2023	Veda Mektubu	Alanur Yıldız	Leading role
2026	Ömür Usta	Ömür Uçar	Leading role

== Theater ==
- Aşk Gibi, 2002
- Sen Olmasaydın, 2006 (together with Cem Özer)
- Geleceğin Starı, 2018 (judge) Star TV
- Bir Barda Bir Gece

== Awards ==
Awards and nominations
Year	Award	Category	Result
2001	Journalists Association Magazine	Best Actress	Won
2002	Journalists Association Magazine	Best Actress	Won
2005	Golden Boll Award	Best Actress	Won
2007	Sadri Alışık Acting Awards	Best Actress	Won
2007	Contemporary Screen Actors Guild Awards	Best Actress	Won
2008	Siyad Awards	Best Actress	Won
2008	Golden Orange Award	Best Actress	Won
2014	Golden Okra Award	Best Female Character	Won
2015	Sadri Alışık Acting Awards	Best Performance by an Actress in a Motion Picture - Drama	Won
2017	Distinctive International Arab Festivals Awards	Best Actress	Won
2022	Next Generation Indie Film Awards	Best Actress in a Feature Film	Won
2024	Yıldız Technical University	Honorary Award	Won
2025	Best of Rumeli Awards	Rumelian Women's Art Value	Won

Awards
Preceded by not held	Golden Boll Award for Best Actress; 2005 for Eğreti Gelin	Succeeded by Feride Çetin
Preceded by Özgü Namal	Golden Orange Award for Best Actress; 2008 for Vicdan	Succeeded by Nergis Öztürk
