= Rory Cochrane =

American actor

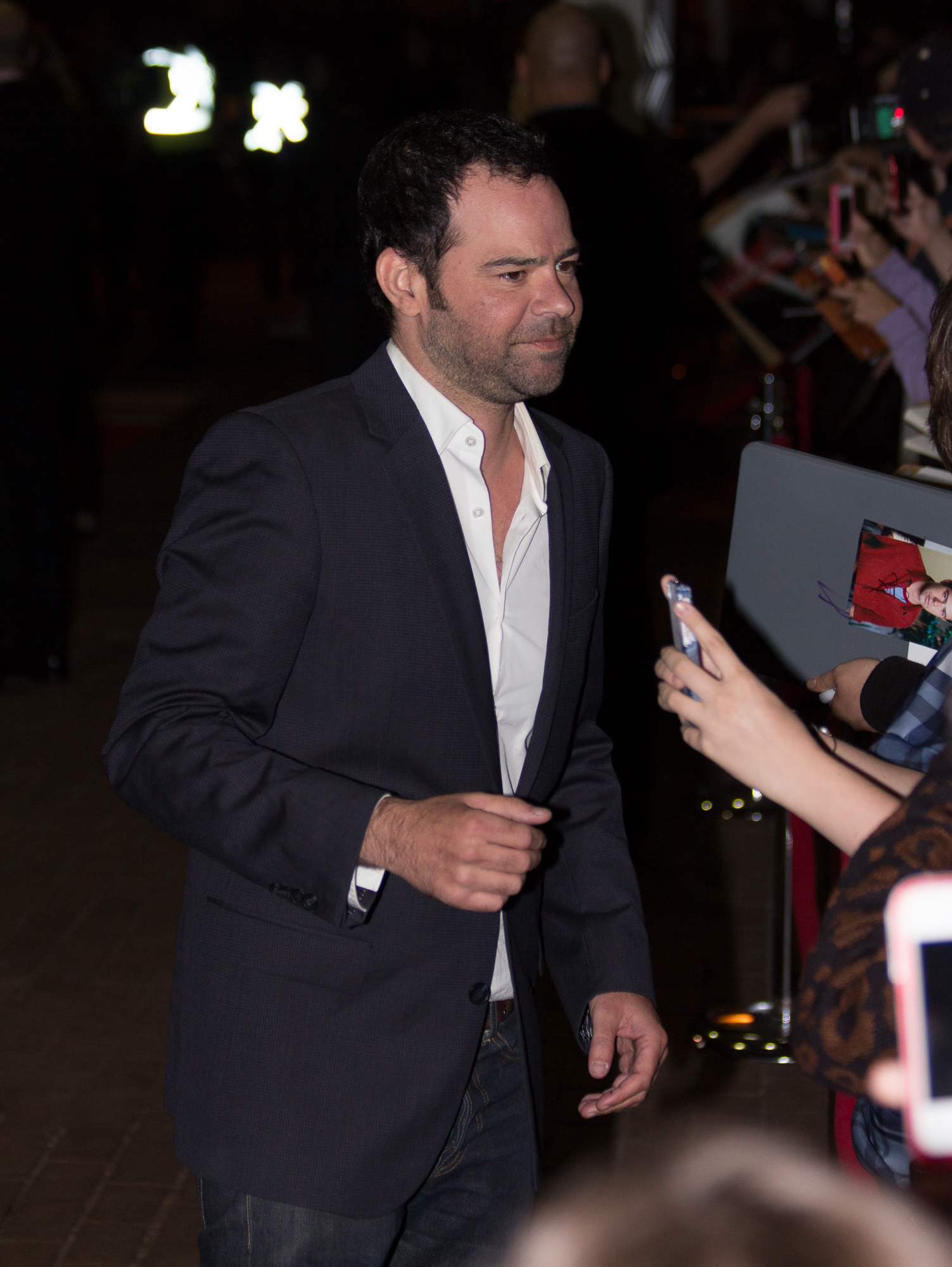
- Cochrane in 2013
- Born: February 28, 1972 (age 54); Syracuse, New York, U.S.
- Occupation: Actor
- Years active: 1991–present

Rory Cochrane (born February 28, 1972) is an American actor. He is known for playing Ron Slater in Dazed and Confused, Lucas in Empire Records, Lee Schatz in Argo, Freck in A Scanner Darkly, and Tim Speedle in CSI: Miami.

== Career ==
Cochrane's first roles included a part in a docudrama about drugs on Saturday Night with Connie Chung (1989) and an appearance in an episode of H.E.L.P. (1990). He then made his film debut (with about fifteen seconds' screen time) in A Kiss Before Dying, followed by his first substantial role as Jeff Goldblum's son in Fathers & Sons.

Cochrane's breakout role came when he was cast as stoner Ron Slater in 1993's Dazed and Confused. Cochrane followed up with a well-received performance as the psychotic Billy Mack in the Renée Zellweger action comedy Love and a .45 in 1994. Cochrane appeared in the comedy Empire Records (1995) which was a box office bomb, but prominent film critic Roger Ebert praised his performance as a highlight of the film.

Cochrane had a supporting part in the 2002 action-drama Hart's War starring Bruce Willis. He also appeared in the Richard Linklater film A Scanner Darkly (2006).

Cochrane played the role of CSI Tim Speedle in CSI: Miami seasons 1–3. Cochrane also reprised his role in the season 6 episode "Bang, Bang, Your Debt", as a hallucination to Eric Delko.

In 2015, Cochrane had a supporting role as Boston mobster Stephen Flemmi in the true-crime film Black Mass, which starred Johnny Depp.

== Filmography ==
=== Film ===
Year	Title	Role	Notes
1991	A Kiss Before Dying	Chico	
1992	Fathers & Sons	Ed	
1993	Dazed and Confused	Ron Slater	
1994	Love and a .45	Billy Mack Black	
1995	Empire Records	Lucas	
1995	The Low Life	John	
1997	Dogtown	Curtis Lasky	
1997	Right at your Door	Brad	
1998	The Adventures of Sebastian Cole	"Chi-Town"	
1999	Flawless	"Pogo"	
1999	Black and White	Chris O'Brien	
2000	Sunset Strip	Felix	
2000	The Prime Gig	Joel	
2001	Southlander	Chance	
2002	Hart's War	Sergeant Carl S. Webb	
2006	Right at Your Door	Brad	
2006	A Scanner Darkly	Charles Freck	
2009	Public Enemies	FBI Agent Carter Baum	
2010	Passion Play	Rickey	
2011	Bringing Up Bobby	Walt	
2012	Argo	Lee Schatz	Hollywood Film Festival Award for Ensemble of the Year; Screen Actors Guild Award for Outstanding Performance by a Cast in a Motion Picture; Nominated—Phoenix Film Critics Society Award for Best Cast; Nominated—San Diego Film Critics Society Award for Best Cast
2013	Parkland	Earl Rose, The Coroner	
2013	Oculus	Alan Russell	
2015	Black Mass	Stevie "The Rifleman" Flemmi	
2016	Soy Nero	Sergeant McCloud	
2017	The Most Hated Woman in America	Gary Karr	
2017	Hostiles	Master Sergeant Thomas Metz	
2018	The Outsider	Anthony Panetti	
2018	White Boy Rick	FBI Agent Frank Byrd	
2021	Encounter	Shepard West	
2021	Antlers	Dan Lecroy	
2022	Tyson's Run	Bobby Hollerman	
2023	Boston Strangler	Detective DeLine	
2024	King Ivory	Beatty	

=== Television ===
Year	Title	Role	Notes
1990	H.E.L.P.	Second Kid	Episode: "Fire Down Below"
1997	The Last Don	Dante Clericuzio	3 episodes
2002	CSI: Crime Scene Investigation	CSI Level 3 Tim Speedle	Episode: "Cross-Jurisdictions"
2002–2007	CSI: Miami	CSI Level 3 Tim Speedle	50 episodes
2007	The Company	Yevgeny Tsipin	6 episodes
2009	24	Greg Seaton	7 episodes
2019	Reprisal	Burt	6 episodes
2022	Winning Time: The Rise of the Lakers Dynasty	Jerry Tarkanian	2 Episodes
2024	Yellowstone	Detective Dillard	4 episodes
TBA	The Murder of JonBenét Ramsey	John Eller	Upcoming series

=== Video games ===
Year	Title	Role	Notes
2004	CSI: Miami	CSI Level 3 Tim Speedle	Voice role
