= Tunç Başaran =

Turkish filmmaker and actor (1938–2019)

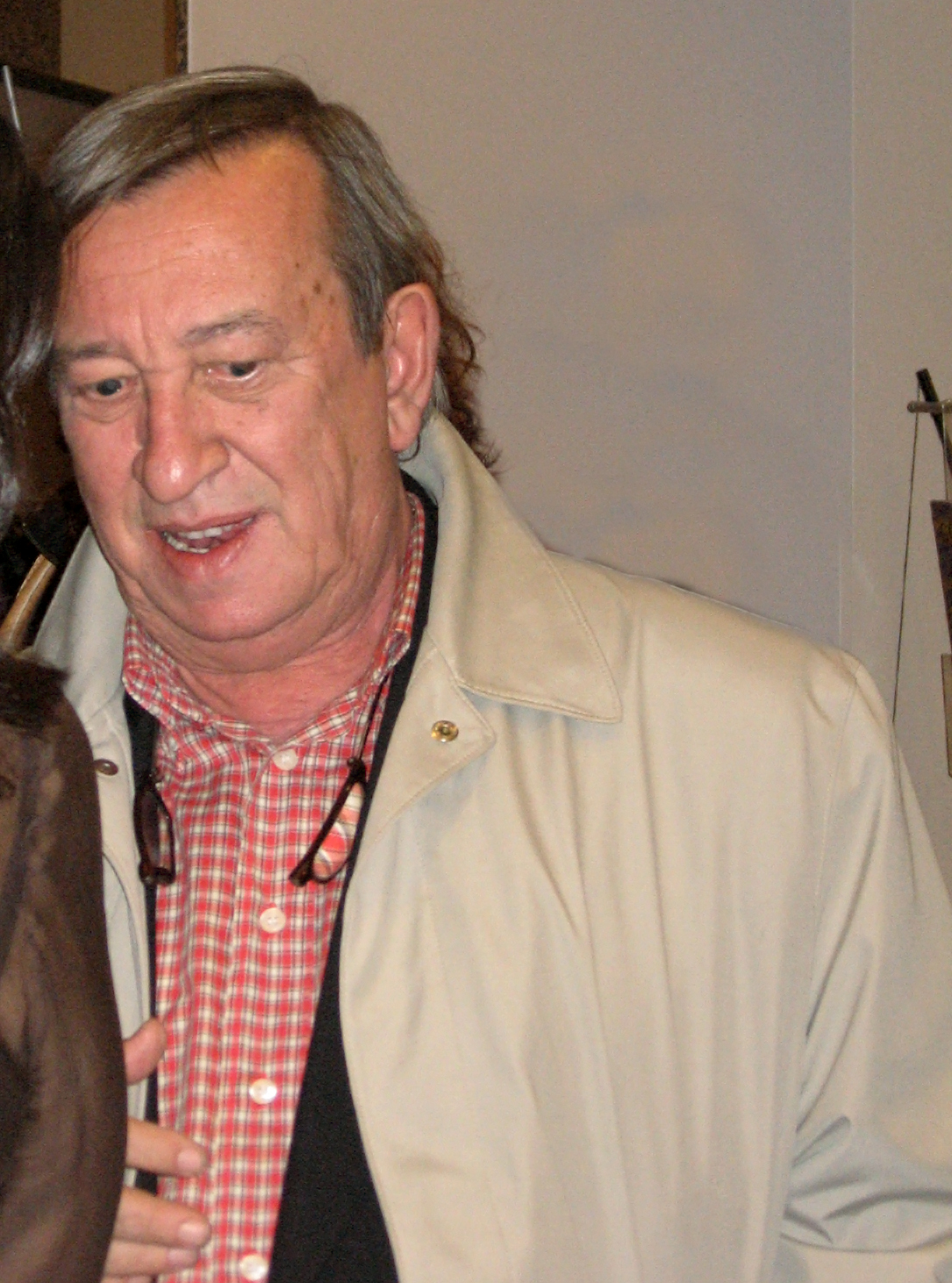
Tunç Başaran at the opening ceremony of the 2008 Istanbul International Film Festival

Tunç Başaran (October 1, 1938 – December 18, 2019) was a Turkish screenwriter, film director, film producer and actor.

== Biography ==
After attending the Faculty of Literature for a while he left school and started working as a script writer for the director Memduh Ün. He then continued to be the assistant of Memduh Ün for a long time. Meanwhile, he also worked as assistant for such directors as Ömer Lütfi Akad, Halit Refiğ, Atıf Yılmaz, and Ertem Göreç. In 1964 he directed his first feature Survival. By 1962, he had directed about 40 films. After 1972, he switched to commercials. He directed Don't Let Them Shoot The Kite in 1989. He served on the advisory board of the Istanbul International Film Festival.

== Filmography ==
=== Director ===
- On Korkusuz Adam (1964) ... a.k.a. Ten Fearless Men (International: English title)
- Kara Memed (1964)
- Hayat Kavgası (1964) ... a.k.a. The Struggle to Live
- On Korkusuz Kadın (1965) ... a.k.a. Ten Fearless Women (International: English title)
- Murtaza (1965)
- Konyakçı (1965)
- Horasan'ın Üç Atlısı (1965)
- Vatan Kurtaran Aslan (1966)
- Kanunsuz Yol (1966)
- Fatih'in Fedaisi (1966)
- Kara Davut (1967)
- Elveda (1967)
- Büyük Kin (1967)
- Gönüllü Kahramanlar (1968)
- Tarkan (1969)
- Hazreti Ali (1969)
- Allah'in Aslanı Ali (1969)
- Acı İle Karışık (1969)
- Üç Kral Serseri (1970)
- Küçük Hanımın Şoförü (1970)
- Gönül Meyhanesi (1970)
- Gölgedeki Adam (1970)
- Cafer Bey (1970)
- On Küçük Şeytan (1971)
- Korkusuz Kaptan Swing (1971) ... a.k.a. Courageous Captain Swing (USA: literal English title)
- Ayşecik ve Sihirli Cüceler Rüyalar Ülkesinde (1971) ... a.k.a. Ayşecik and the Bewitched Dwarfs in Dreamland ... a.k.a. Ayşecik in the Land of the Magic Dwarfs (USA: literal English title) ... a.k.a. The Turkish Wizard of Oz (USA: video box title)

... a.k.a. Turkish Wizard of Oz (USA: bootleg title)

- Gece List of Turkish films of 1972
- Şehvet (1972)
- Demir Yumruk: Devler Geliyor (1973) ... a.k.a. Iron Fist: The Giants Are Coming (USA: literal English title)
- Biri ve Diğerleri (1987) ... a.k.a. One and the Others
- Uçurtmayı Vurmasınlar (1989) ... a.k.a. Don't Let Them Shoot the Kite (International: English title: festival title)
- Piyano Piyano Bacaksız (1990) ... a.k.a. Piano Piano Kid (USA) ... a.k.a. Softly, Softly Little One
- Uzun İnce Bir Yol (1991) ... a.k.a. A Long Narrow Path
- Sen de Gitme (1995) ... a.k.a. Don't Leave Triandfilis

... a.k.a. Ne pars pas, Triandfilis (France) ... a.k.a. Please Don't Go

- Azmi (1995) (mini) TV Series
- Kaçıklık Diplomasi (1998)
- Abuzer Kadayıf (2000)
- Üç Kişilik Aşk (2004) (TV)
- Teberik Şanssız (2004)
- Büyülü Fener (2005)
- Sinema Bir Mucizedir (2005)

=== Screenwriter ===
- Kara Memed (1964)
- Kanunsuz Yol (1966)
- Büyük Kin (1967)
- Gönüllü Kahramanlar (1968)
- Acı İle Karışık (1969)
- Üç Kral Serseri (1970)
- Gönül Meyhanesi (1970)
- Cafer Bey (1970)
- Şehvet (1972)
- Demir Yumruk: Devler Geliyor (1973) ... a.k.a. Iron Fist: The Giants Are Coming (USA: literal English title)
- Uçurtmayı Vurmasınlar (1989) ... a.k.a. Don't Let Them Shoot the Kite (International: English title: festival title)
- Piyano Piyano Bacaksız (1990) ... a.k.a. Piano Piano Kid (USA) ... a.k.a. Softly, Softly Little One
- Uzun İnce Bir Yol (1991) ... a.k.a. A Long Narrow Path
- Kaçıklık Diplomasi (1998)

=== Actor ===
- Beş Kardeştiler (1962)
- Rıfat Diye Biri (1962) ... a.k.a. A Person Named Rıfat (International: English title)
- Bire On Vardı (1963)

=== Producer ===
- Uçurtmayı Vurmasınlar (1989) ... a.k.a. Don't Let Them Shoot the Kite (International: English title: festival title)

== Bibliography ==
- Turksinemasi.com - Biography of Tunç Başaran
- Sinematurk.com - Filmography of Tunç Başaran

Awards
Preceded by not held	Golden Boll Award for Best Director; 1992 for Piano Piano Bacaksız shared with Yusuf Kurçenli	Succeeded by Memduh Ün
Preceded by Kadir Sözen	Golden Boll Award for Best Director; 1996 for Sen de Gitme	Succeeded by Zeki Demirkubuz
Preceded by Canan Gerede	Golden Orange Award for Best Director; 1996 for Sen de Gitme	Succeeded by Ferzan Özpetek
