= Fatoş Sezer =

Turkish actress

- Born: 31 January 1958; Gölcük, Kocaeli, Turkey
- Died: 1 June 2011 (aged 53); Şişli, Istanbul, Turkey
- Years active: 1984–2009
- Spouse: Mehmet Ulusoy (m. 1986; div. 1994)

Fatoş Sezer (31 January 1958 – 1 June 2011) was a Turkish actress.

== Life and career ==
Fatoş Sezer was born in 1958 in Gölcük as the youngest of three children in her family. Her parents were Polish immigrants who had escaped to Turkey during World War II. Sezer's father died when she was 6 years old; her mother died four years later. She married her first husband at the age of 17. In 1980, she began modelling and in the same year started to take acting, dance and custom designing lessons at Bilsak Theatre. She made her cinematic debut four years later with a role in Gönlüm ve Ben. She then started a relationship with stage actor Beklan Algan, before moving to Paris to continue her studies. She studied French language and literature at the College of Sorbonne. In 1986, Sezer married director Mehmet Ulusoy in Paris. She then joined the crew of Theatre de Liberte, founded by Ulusoy.

In the second half of 1980s, Sezer was cast in a number of movies directed by Halit Refiğ. With her role in Refiğ'is 1987 movie Kurtar Beni, she was awarded as the Best Supporting Actress at the 25th Antalya Golden Orange Film Festival. In early 1990s, she again shifted her attention towards theatre and appeared in plays directed by her husband Mehmet Ulusoy. In 1994, she divorced Mehmet Ulusoy and began a relationship with Hüsrev Gerede's son Selçuk Gerede. Towards the end of her career, Sezer took part in different television productions and worked as an art director for magazines such as Rugby Türkiye and Auto Türkiye.

Fatoş Sezer died at the age of 53 after suffering a heart attack in her sleep on 1 June 2011 at her house in Kurtuluş. The next day her funeral was held at Şişli Mosque and her body was buried at Edirnekapı Sakızağacı Cemetery.
