= Serkan Acar =

Turkish footballer

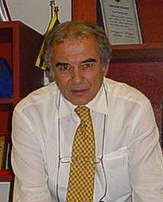

Personal information
- Full name: Serkan Acar
- Date of birth: August 31, 1948
- Place of birth: Istanbul, Turkey
- Date of death: April 18, 2013 (aged 64)
- Place of death: Istanbul, Turkey
- Positions: Defender; midfielder

Senior career*
Years	Team	Apps	(Gls)
1967–1978	Fenerbahçe	295	(13)
Total		295	(13)
- * Club domestic league appearances and goals

Serkan Acar (August 31, 1948, in Istanbul – April 18, 2013, in Istanbul) was a Turkish football player of Fenerbahçe. He played as a defender and sometimes as a midfielder. He was the general manager of Fenerbahçe S.K.

He started his career with Fenerbahçe S.K. and played there for 11 years between 1967 and 1978. He scored 13 goals in 295 matches and won 1967-68, 1969–70, 1973–74, 1974–75 and 1977-78 Turkish League also won 1973-74 Turkish Cup.
