= Cem Islamoglu =

German footballer (born 1980)

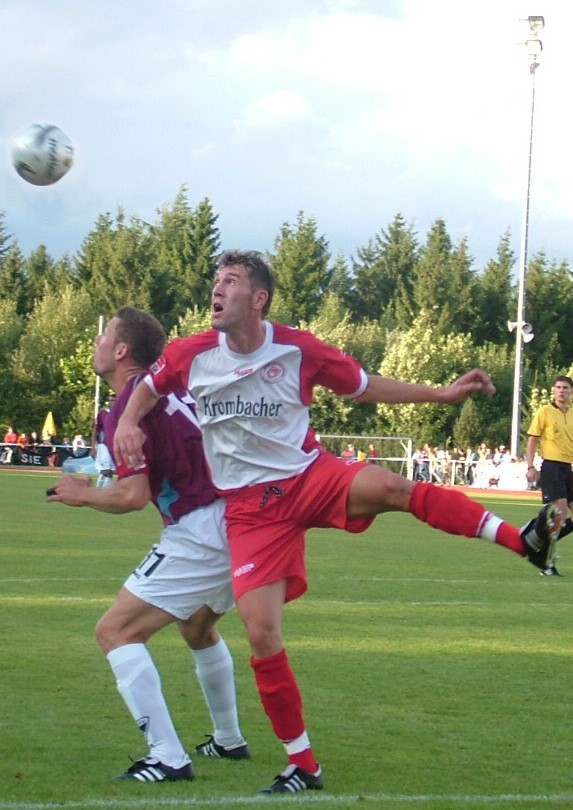
- Islamoglu playing for Sportfreunde Siegen

Personal information
- Date of birth: 4 September 1980 (age 46)
- Place of birth: Haiger, West Germany
- Height: 1.94 m (6 ft 4 in)
- Position: Centre-back

Youth career
- –2000: Sportfreunde Siegen

Senior career*
Years	Team	Apps	(Gls)
2000–2008	Sportfreunde Siegen	183	(7)
2008–2010	SV Elversberg	51	(1)
2010–2013	Darmstadt 98	74	(1)
2013–2015	Waldhof Mannheim		

Managerial career
- 2016–2017: Südwest Ludwigshafen
- * Club domestic league appearances and goals

Cem Islamoglu (born 4 September 1980) is a German former professional footballer who played as a centre-back.

He was the manager of SV Südwest Ludwigshafen from 2016 to 2017. He later managed Enosis Mannheim.
