= Piano Piano Kid =

1991 film

- Film poster
- Directed by: Tunç Başaran
- Written by: Tunç Başaran
- Starring: Rutkay Aziz
- Release date: 25 October 1991
- Running time: 81 minutes
- Country: Turkey
- Language: Turkish

Piano Piano Kid (Turkish: Piano Piano Bacaksız) is a 1991 Turkish drama film directed by Tunç Başaran. The film was selected as the Turkish entry for the Best Foreign Language Film at the 65th Academy Awards, but was not accepted as a nominee.

== Cast ==
- Rutkay Aziz as Kerim
- Emin Sivas as Kemal
- Serap Aksoy as Kamile
- Yaman Okay as Hizir
- Aysegul Ünsa as Feriha

== See also ==
- List of submissions to the 65th Academy Awards for Best Foreign Language Film
- List of Turkish submissions for the Academy Award for Best Foreign Language Film
