= Lucia Rikaki =

Lucia Rikaki (Greek: Λουκία Ρικάκη; 14 July 1961, Piraeus – 28 December 2011, Athens) was a Greek film director, documentarist, writer and producer. From 1979 to 1981 Rikaki studied art history, graphic design, cinema and photography at the Dartington College of Arts in Devon, England. In 1984 she founded "Orama Films" producing art films, TV programmes and theatrical plays. In 1995 she created "104 Art Theater Stage", and "The Comedy Club" the only stand-up comedy venue to date in Greece. She is best known for her documentaries about socially sensitive issues such as immigration, education and the lives of the disabled in Greece.

== Filmography ==
=== Feature films ===
- 2007 You Hurt my heart an essay collective film 47
- 2006 Hold me 35MM 94’ www.holdme.gr http://kratiseme.blogspot.com/
- 2001 Comedy Nights the film 35MM 94’
- 1999 Dancing Soul 35MM 94’ Bronze Award Worldfest Houston 2000
- 1994 Quartet in 4 movements 35MM music by Z.Preisner 109’ best selling European film in Greece
- 1991 A Trip to Australia 35MM 90’ SVT, TV2, AVRO, CINEPAQ

=== Feature documentaries ===
- 2009 Sing Along 68min
- 2008 Meant to leave 52 min
- 2006 Does humor travel 52 min
- 2006 Commons what we hold in common 54 min
- 2004 The Other 35MM 75min/52min
- 2003 The Aegean in the words of the poets 35MM 61min award for best script Ministry of Culture
- 2002 Tonight at the Comedy Club 128’
- 2002 Words of silence 35MM www.wordsofsilence.gr Award for best Greek documentary Kalamata Film Festival 2002/ Szolnok Intl Film Festival Hungarian Film Association Award 2003

=== Short documentaries ===
- 2008 Small things that matter 30min
- 2002 Culture games 30min
- 2002 Bookreading - a game in schools 30’
- 2001 Greek illustrators 26min
- 2000 Falsified Expectations 30min on puberty and utopia
- 1992 In the Traces of the Argonauts 60’ shot in Georgia
- 1990 European House 60’ shot in Berlin
- 1989 Maria Farantouri - Leo Brouwer the film 30’
- 1993 Prelude to Africa 25’ shot in Africa
- 1986 The Path 20’ shot in India
- 1984 The Journey of Dionysos 60’ documentaries on theater https://web.archive.org/web/20131009215129/http://luciarikaki.gr/theatre_GR.htm
- 1997 Memory Land 60’ on actors and acting methods
- 1996 SurrealEros 120’ the acclaimed original theater performance
- 1993 Quartet 60’ by Heiner Muller performed by Attis
- 1988 Medea Material 60’ by Heiner Muller performed by Attis
- 1987 Ancient Drama Contemporary Views 54’ various artists
- 1987 20th Century Dance 60’ various artists
- 1985 Bacchae 90’ performed by Attis theater company

=== Shorts ===
- 2009 Yes the Tied House 6min
- 2007 Our Own Pleasures 8min
- 2002 Window of time 3’
- 2000 Now we Travel 5’ Microcinema Award
- 2000 Embracing the Tree 9’ ARTE Award Lille
- 1999 Open a door for Nicola 8’ for the BBC
- 1982 Suzie’s Walk 4’
- 1984-88 14 documentary shorts films on contemporary arts and artists

=== Theatre ===
- 1995 Orgia by Pasolini directed by Lucia RikaKi
- 1996 SurrealEros written, translated and directed by Lucia Rikaki
- 1997 Musica II by Marguerite Duras translated and directed by Lucia Rikaki
- 1998 The blossom of the sea written and directed by Lucia Rikaki
- 1998 Ulysses Dialogues adapted and directed by Lucia Rikaki for the Athens Concert Hall
- 1995-2004 Comedy Nights at the only Comedy Club in Greece created by L.Rikaki
