= Propaganda (1999 film) =

- Theatrical poster
- Directed by: Sinan Çetin
- Written by: Sinan Çetin; Gülin Tokat
- Produced by: Sinan Çetin; Cemil Çetin; Susa Kohlstedt
- Starring: Kemal Sunal; Metin Akpınar; Meltem Cumbul; Rafet El Roman; Sinan Çetin
- Cinematography: Rebekka Haas
- Music by: Sezen Aksu; Nejat Özer; Yavuz Çetin; Erkan Oğur
- Production company: Plato Film
- Release date: January 5, 1999
- Running time: 120 mins
- Country: Turkey
- Language: Turkish

Propaganda is a 1999 Turkish comedy drama film written, directed and produced Sinan Çetin. The film, which is a darkly surreal comedy set in a sleepy village in the southeast Turkey in 1948, starred popular comedy actor Kemal Sunal, who died a year later in 2000. It was shown in competition at the 18th Istanbul International Film Festival and the 4th Shanghai International Film Festival, where it won the Golden Goblet, and went on general release across Turkey on January 5, 1999.

== Production ==
The film was shot on location in Hatay, Turkey.

== Synopsis ==
Based on a true story set in 1948, customs officer Mehti is faced with the duty of formally setting up the border between Turkey and Syria, dividing his hometown. He is unaware of the pain that will imminently unfold, as families, languages, cultures and lovers are both ripped apart and clash head on in a village once united.

== Cast ==
- Kemal Sunal as Mehdi
- Metin Akpınar as Rahim
- Meltem Cumbul as Filiz
- Rafet El Roman as Âdem
- Meral Orhonsay as Şahane
- Ali Sunal as Mahmut
- Nazmiye Oral as Azamet
- Müge Oruçkaptan as Nazmiye
- Berfi Dicle as Melek
- Kenan Baydemir as Hamdi
- Nail Kırmızıgül as Kopuk Yaşar
- Turgay Aydın as Cemil
- Cem Safran as Abuzer
- Zaven Çiğdemoğlu as Deli Selami
- Baycan Baybur as Komiser Muavini
- Ayşegül Yurdakul as Köylü Kadın
- Cengiz Deveci as Belediye Başkanı
- Özcan Pehlivan as Asker
- Bahar Uçan as Şadiye
- Sultan Yılmaz as Rahim'in Annesi
- Ahmet Tok as Genç Köylü
- Üzeyir Tok as Selcuk
- Turgut Giray as Cemil
- Sinan Çetin as Sheakespeare

== Release ==
=== Festival screenings ===
- 4th Shanghai International Film Festival (October 22–31, 1999)
- 18th Istanbul International Film Festival

== Reception ==
=== Awards ===
- Won: 4th Shanghai International Film Festival Golden Goblet
- Won: Bogey Award
