= Tevfik Başer =

Turkish-German film director

- Born: 12 January 1951 (age 75); Çankırı, Turkey
- Occupations: Film director, screenwriter
- Years active: 1983-1991

Tevfik Başer (born 12 January 1951) is a Turkish-German film director and screenwriter. His film Lebewohl, Fremde was screened in the Un Certain Regard section at the 1991 Cannes Film Festival.

== Filmography ==
- Zwischen Gott und Erde (1983)
- 40 Quadratmeter Deutschland (1986)
- Abschied vom falschen Paradies (1989)
- Lebewohl, Fremde (1991)
