= Berlin in Berlin =

1993 film

- Film poster
- Directed by: Sinan Çetin
- Written by: Ümit Ünal; Sinan Çetin
- Produced by: Sinan Çetin
- Starring: Hülya Avşar
- Cinematography: Rebekka Haas
- Release date: July 1993
- Running time: 99 minutes
- Country: Turkey
- Languages: Turkish; German

Berlin in Berlin is a 1993 Turkish drama film directed by Sinan Çetin. It was entered into the 18th Moscow International Film Festival where Hülya Avşar won the award for Best Actress.

== Cast ==
- Hülya Avşar as Dilber
- Cem Özer as Muertuez
- Armin Block as Thomas
- Aliye Rona as Ugu
- Eşref Kolçak as Ekber
- Nilüfer Aydan as Zehra
- Clemens-Maria Haas as Olaf
- Zafer Ergin as Mehmet
- Emrah Aydemir as Yueksel
- Volkan Akabali as Yuecel
