= Paul Mones =

American lawyer and author

Paul Mones is an American lawyer and author. Mones specializes in representing victims of child sexual abuse against institutions like the Boy Scouts of America and the Catholic Church. He has also defended children accused of killing a parent. He is the author of the books When a Child Kills: Abused Children Who Kill Their Parents and Stalking Justice: The Dramatic True Story of the Detective Who First Used DNA Testing to Catch a Serial Killer.

== Early life ==
Paul Mones received his BA from the State University of New York at Buffalo and completed his JD at the University of North Carolina Law School. After law school he became a staff lawyer for West Virginia Legal Services. He became the director of a juvenile justice program in Morgantown, West Virginia. He has practiced law in Portland, Oregon, and in Los Angeles.

== Legal career ==
During the 1980s and 1990s, Mones was described as the only lawyer in the United States specializing on the defense of sexually abused and physically abused children accused of killing their parents. Between 1981 and 1993, Mones defended or acted as a consultant on more than two hundred parricide cases. Mones’ advocacy work also extended to developing public service announcements about child abuse with organizations like the NBA.

In 2010 in Portland, Oregon, Mones won a $19.9 million verdict against the Boy Scouts of America filed by a former scout who had been sexually abused by his Scout leader in the mid- 1980s. This verdict resulted in the release of the Perversion Files that had been maintained by the Boy Scouts for about ninety years. The files, which were released for the period 1965 through 1985, detailed the sexual abuse of scouts by their adult leaders. The case was a part of Mones’ current practice representing victims of child sexual abuse against trusted authority figures in public and religious organizations.

Mones has also been quoted as an expert on child's rights advocacy and sexual abuse cases. Interviews with Mones about his work have appeared in segments for television news shows such as CNN, Frontline, Oprah, 60 Minutes, and 20/20.

== Writing ==
In 1985, Mones authored the study The Relationship Between Parricide and Child Abuse: An Overview, on the relationship between parricide and child abuse. In his work, Mones argued that his case studies that the primary reason teens killed their parents was because they believed no one would help end their abuse, and that the abuse was likely to escalate into their own demise.

In 1991 Mones authored the book When a Child Kills: Abused Children Who Kill Their Parents (Pocket Books: ISBN 067167420X). In his book he claimed that most American runaway children leave home to escape parental abuse, and that most of the cases of children killing their parents in the US are the result of child abuse. Mones also wrote of cases in which abused children would deny the abuse even after the homicide because of shame and embarrassment.

In 1996, Mones wrote Stalking Justice: The Dramatic True Story of the Detective Who First Used DNA Testing to Catch a Serial Killer (Pocket Books: ISBN 067170348X), a true crime story concerning the first time DNA was used in rape-murder case in the United States. Kirkus Reviews wrote of the book that, "Mones brings to his story gritty, specific descriptions of high-tech forensics that will fascinate true-crime buffs and mystery fans alike. Novelistic suspense, strong characterization, plus state-of- the-art crime-solving add up to a natural for summer reading lists."

Mones has also been a contributor to The Huffington Post and the American Bar Association Journal.

== Recognition ==
In 1993 Mones received the Livingston Hall Juvenile Justice Award from the American Bar Association.
