= Sinan Çetin =

Turkish film director, producer, and actor (born 1953)

- Born: 1 March 1953 (age 73); Bahçesaray, Van Province, Turkey
- Education: Hacettepe University
- Occupations: Film director; producer; publisher
- Children: 4
- Awards: Golden Orange award for Best Director /1985)

Sinan Çetin (born 1 March 1953) is a Turkish film director, actor and producer. He won the best director award at the 12th Dhaka International Film Festival.

== Biography ==
Çetin was born as one of the eight children of a customs officer. He is of maternal Azeri and paternal Georgian descent. He studied art history at Hacettepe University. Çetin has produced films, television series and commercials. He is best known for his 1999 film Propaganda, a critically acclaimed libertarian comedy about post-World War II eastern Turkey. Çetin both directed and produced this film. His 1993 film Berlin in Berlin was entered into the 18th Moscow International Film Festival.

Çetin manages and owns the film production company Plato Film Productions. He opened the company in 1986 and it has been expanding ever since. It is one of the most commercially successful Production Companies in Turkey. He is currently working on his 13th feature film named Çanakkale Çocukları. The film will star actors such as Haluk Bilginer, Oktay Kaynarca, Yavuz Bingöl, and Sinan Çetin's two sons Rafael Cemo Çetin and Orfeo Çetin.

== Filmography ==
=== Films ===
- 1982 - Çiçek Abbas (director)
- 1982 - Çirkinler de Sever (director)
- 1985 - 14 Numara (director)
- 1986 - Prenses Gökyüzü (director)
- 1993 - Berlin in Berlin (director)
- 1995 - Bay E (director)
- 1999 - Propaganda (director)
- 2001 - Komser Şekspir (director)
- 2002 - Banka (director)
- 2004 - Okul (producer)
- 2004 - Romantik (director)
- 2005 - Pardon (producer)
- 2005 - Şans Kapıyı Kırınca (actor)
- 2008 - Mutlu Ol! Bu bir emirdir (writer & director)
- 2010 - Kağıt (director)

=== Television ===
- 2004 - Avrupa Yakası
- 2006 - Sahte Prenses

=== Documentary ===
- 1977 - Baskın
- 1977 - Halı Türküsü

Awards
Preceded by Atıf Yılmaz	Golden Orange Award for Best Director; 1985 for 14 Numara	Succeeded by Atıf Yılmaz
