= Vladimir Suslov =

Russian architect (1857–1921)

Vladimir Vasilyevich Suslov
- Владимир Васильевич Суслов
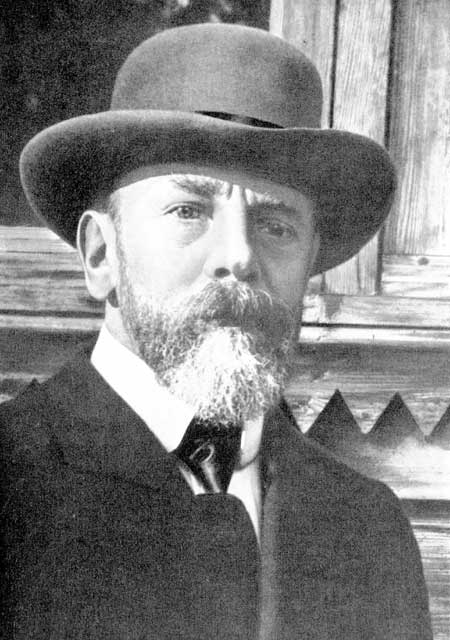
- Born: July 13, 1857; Moscow
- Died: August, 1921; Khvalynsk
- Occupation(s): Architect, archaeologist, restorer

Vladimir Vasilyevich Suslov (Russian: Владимир Васильевич Суслов; 13 July 1857, Moscow – August 1921, Khvalynsk) was a Russian architect, archaeologist, architectural historian and restorer.

== Life and work ==
His father was an icon painter and he spent most of childhood in Palekh. He graduated from the Moscow School of Painting, Sculpture and Architecture in 1878, with a small silver medal. He then entered the Imperial Academy of Arts, graduating as an artist, first class, in 1882. During his time there, he received several medals for his architectural designs. From 1883 to 1887, on behalf of the Academy, he was engaged in preserving ancient monuments throughout the Russian North, in major cities as well as rural areas.

He performed major studies linking the wooden architecture of that area with similar structures in Sweden and Norway. For comparative studies of stone architecture, he traveled to Germany, France and Italy. In 1886, for a project involving baths in the Pompeiian style, he was named an Academician of Architecture by the Russian Geographical Society. His extensive collection of drawings, figures and statistical materials was presented to the Academy in the early 1900s. Many of the archaeological objects that he collected were placed with the Russian Museum of His Imperial Majesty Alexander III.

He also published compilations entitled Essays on the History of Old Russian Architecture, Materials on the architecture of Novgorod and Pskov, Old Ladoga (in collaboration with Nikolai Brandenburg) and Monuments of Old Russian Architecture.

In the years 1889 to 1891, he was mostly involved with restorative work; notably at the Cathedral of the Transfiguration in Pereslavl-Zalessky and in the Mirozhsky Monastery. From 1893 to 1900, he could be found at the Cathedral of St. Sophia, Novgorod, where he discovered hidden paintings and mosaics as well as the original throne.

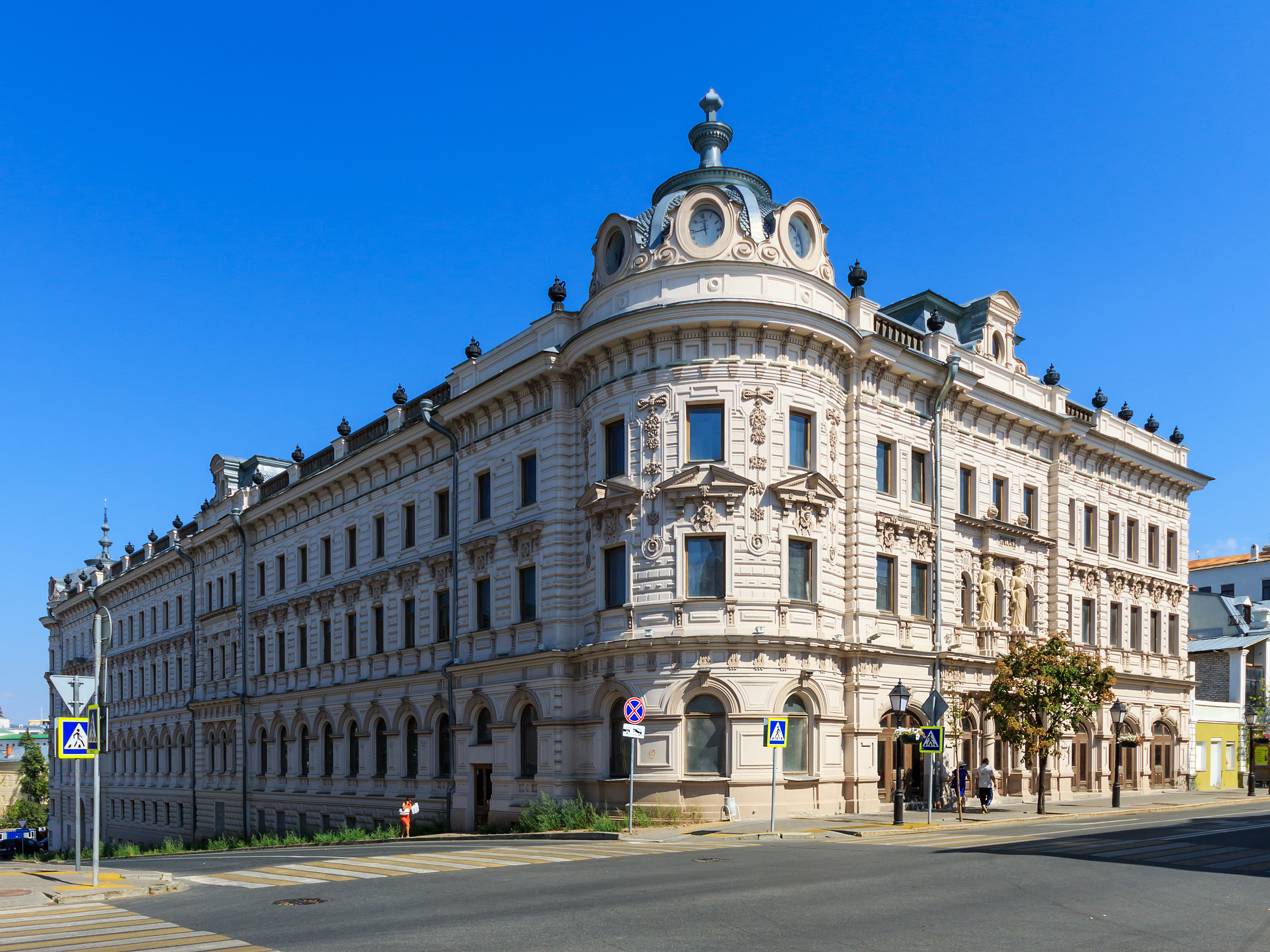
Alexandrovsky Passage, Kazan; a project designed together with Nikolai Pozdeyev.

His practical works included construction of The Russian Monument at San Stefano in San Stefano, commemorating soldiers killed in the Russo-Turkish War; a makeshift pavilion at the All-Russia Exhibition 1896; a church devoted to Seraphim of Sarov in Fedino, and several private cottages.

In the early part of the 20th century, he served in the Office of the Institutions of Empress Maria, as an honorary member of the Council of Children's Shelters, in the Council of Professors at the Academy and as a member of the Imperial Russian Archaeological Society as well as being the founder of the Society for the Renaissance of Artistic Russia (OBXP).

After the Revolution, he served as head of the architectural section of the Monument Protection Department of the People's Commissariat of the RFSFR. He died, most likely of natural causes, during the Russian Civil War, after having fled Moscow.
