= Dekaton =

Dekaton or Decatum (Ancient Greek: Δέκατον) may refer to:

- Dekaton (Bithynia), settlement in ancient Bithynia, now in Asiatic Turkey
- Dekaton (Thrace), settlement in ancient Thrace, now in European Turkey
