= Henaton =

Coordinates: 40°58′33″N 28°49′51″E

Henaton was a town of ancient Thrace, inhabited during Byzantine times.

Its site is located north of Yeşilköy in European Turkey.
