= Dekaton (Thrace) =

Town in ancient Thrace

Coordinates: 40°58′28″N 28°48′39″E

Dekaton (Ancient Greek: Δέκατον, Latin: Decatum) was a town of ancient Thrace.

Its site is located north of Yeşilköy in European Turkey.
