= Treaty of San Stefano =

1878 peace ending the Russo-Turkish War

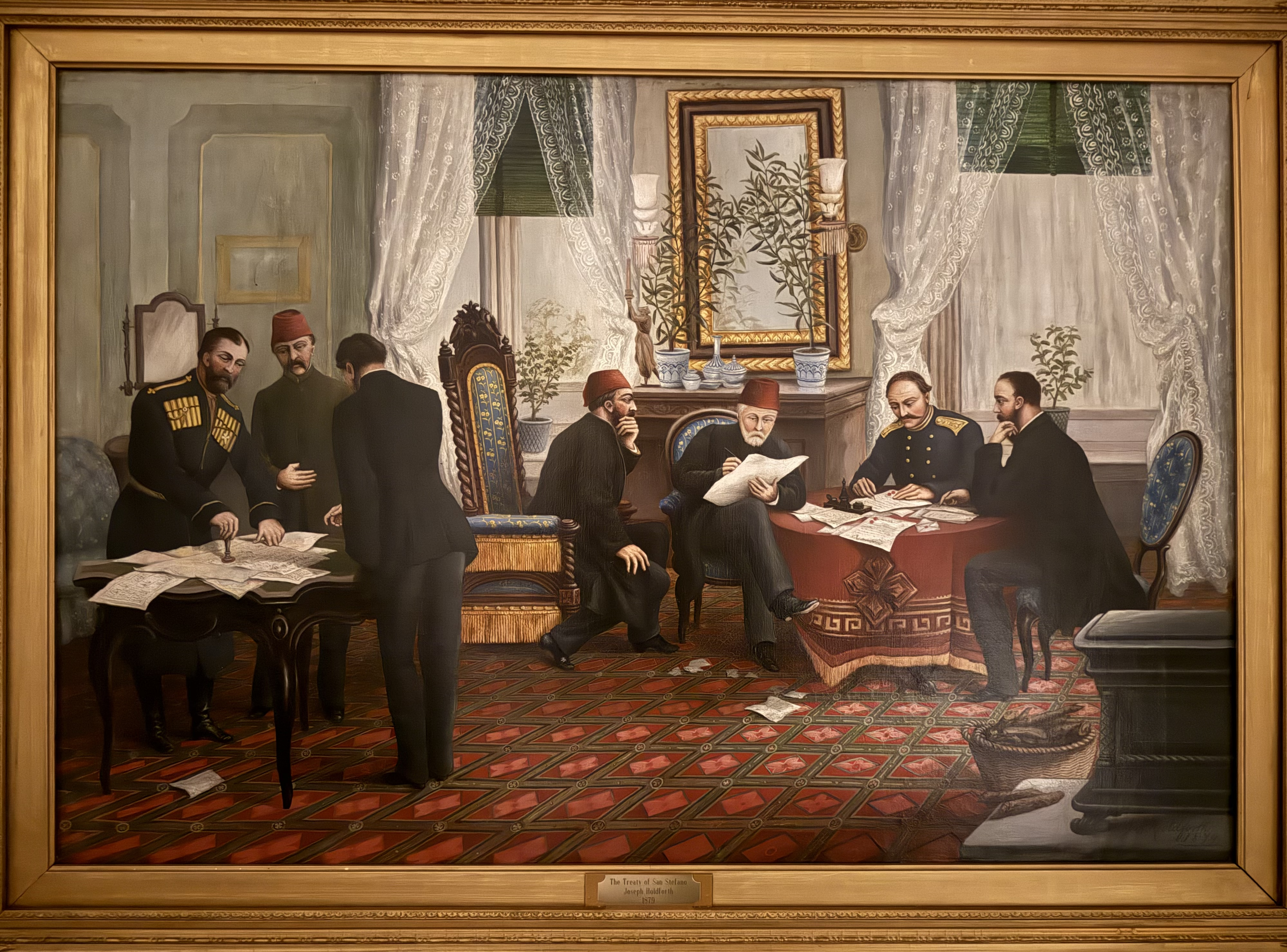
- The signing of the treaty of San Stefano
- Type: Bilateral treaty
- Signed: 3 March 1878
- Location: San Stefano, Ottoman Empire
- Original signatories: Ottoman Empire; Russia

The 1878 Treaty of San Stefano (Russian: Сан-Стефанский мир; Peace of San-Stefano, Сан-Стефанский мирный договор; Peace treaty of San-Stefano, Turkish: Ayastefanos Muahedesi or Ayastefanos Antlaşması) was a treaty between the Russian and Ottoman empires at the conclusion of the Russo-Turkish War of 1877–1878. It was signed at San Stefano, then a village west of Constantinople (present-day Istanbul), on 3 March [O.S. 19 February] 1878 by Count Nicholas Pavlovich Ignatiev and Aleksandr Nelidov on behalf of the Russian Empire and by Foreign Minister Saffet Pasha and Ambassador to Germany Sadullah Pasha on behalf of the Ottoman Empire.

According to the official Russian position, by signing the treaty, Russia had never intended anything more than a temporary rough draft, so as to enable a final settlement with the other Great Powers.

The treaty provided for the establishment of an autonomous Principality of Bulgaria following almost 500 years of Ottoman rule in the Bulgarian lands. Bulgarians celebrate the day the treaty was signed, 3 March [O.S. 19 February] 1878, as Liberation Day. However, the enlarged Bulgaria envisioned by the treaty alarmed neighboring states as well as France and the United Kingdom. As a result, the enlargement was never implemented, being superseded by the Treaty of Berlin following the Congress of the same name that took place three months later.

== Effects ==
=== On Bulgaria ===
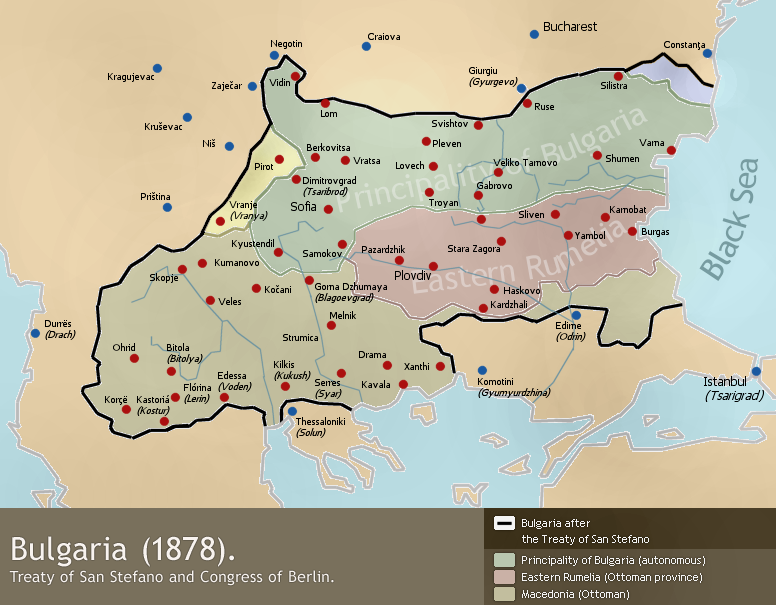
Borders of Bulgaria according to the Preliminary Treaty of San Stefano and the Treaty of Berlin.

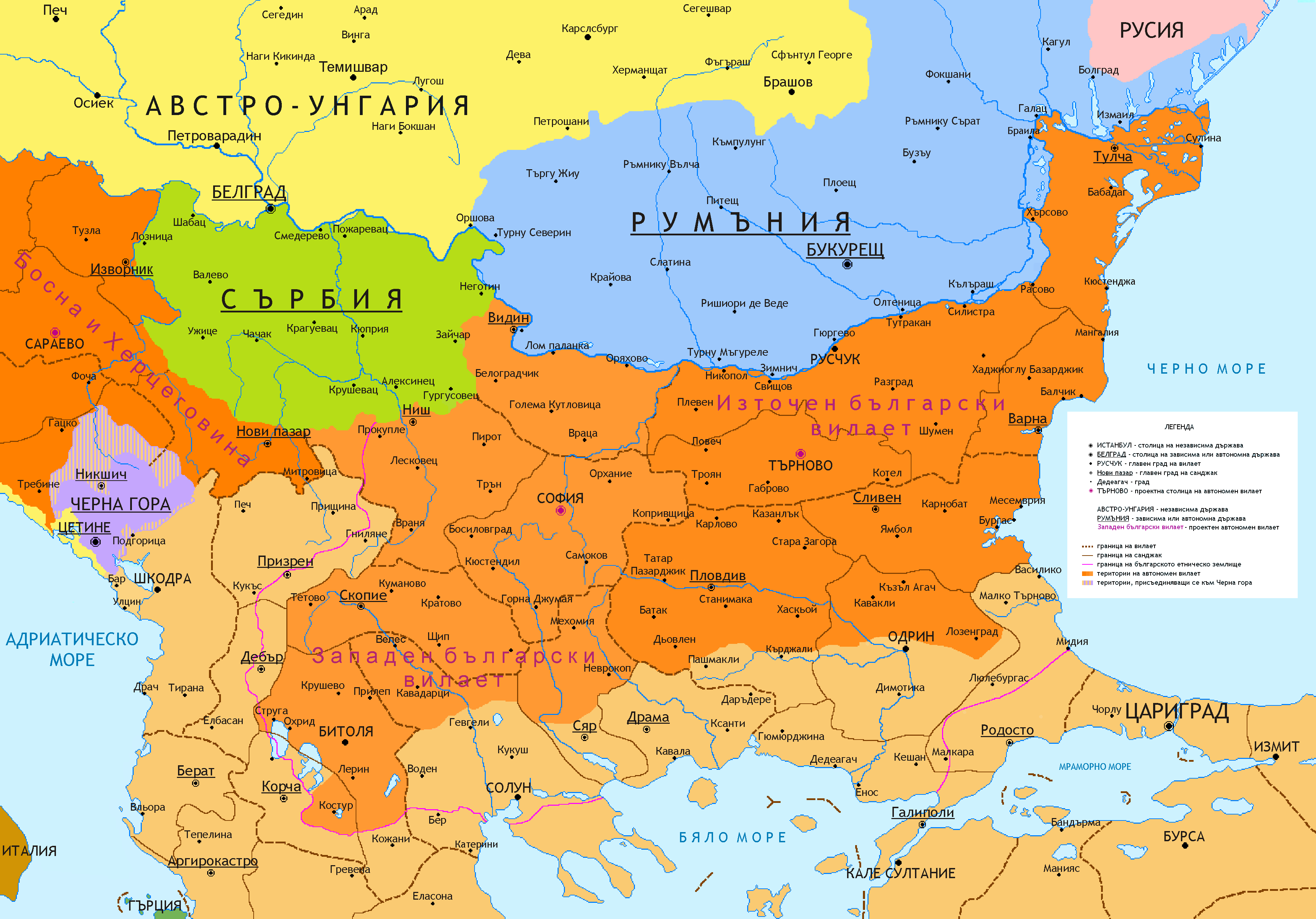
Bulgaria after the Conference of Constantinople, 1876

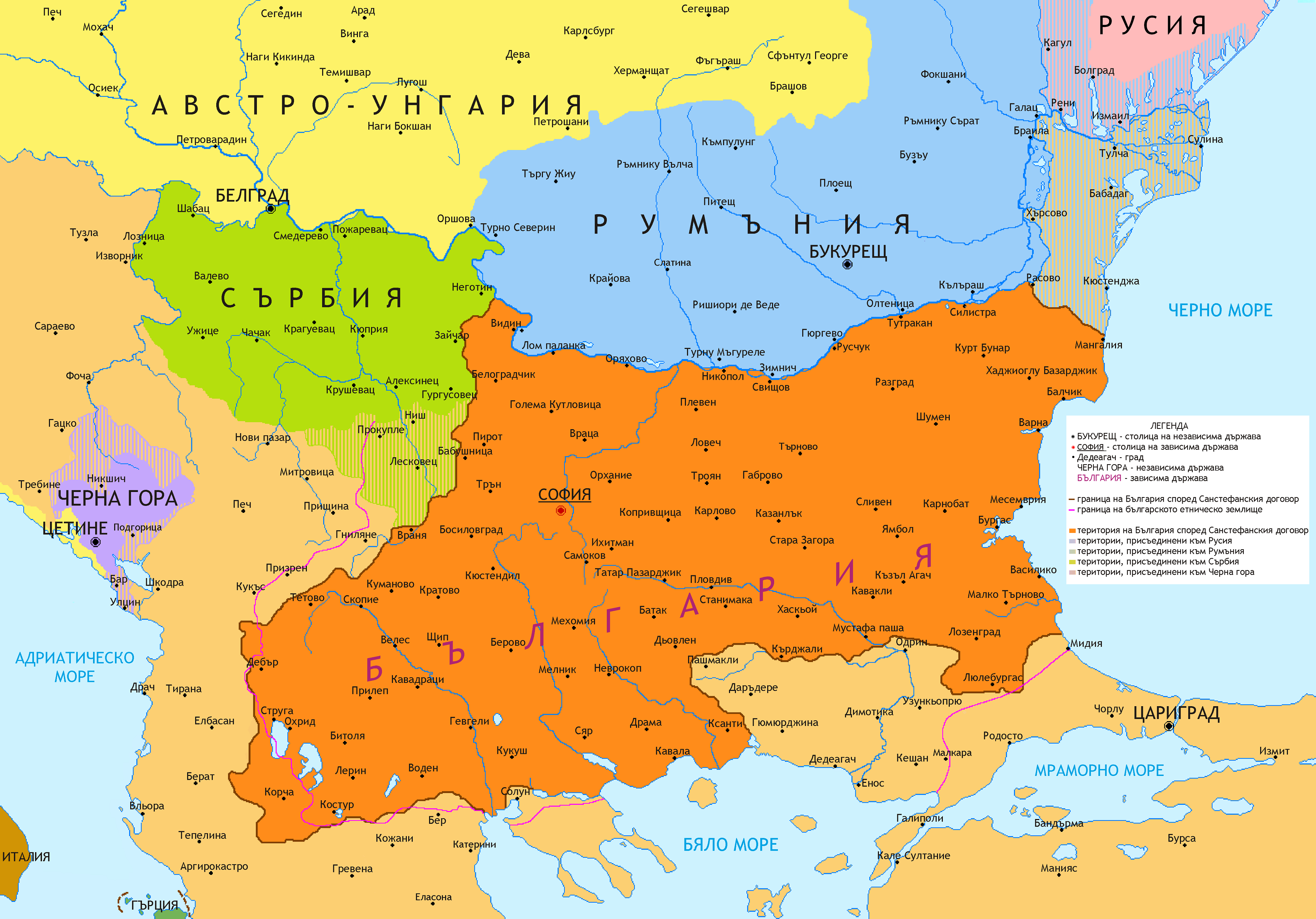
Bulgaria after the Treaty of San Stefano, 1878

The treaty established the autonomous self-governing Principality of Bulgaria, with a Christian government and the right to keep an army. Though still de jure tributary to the Ottomans, the Principality de facto functioned as an independent nation. Its territory included the plain between the Danube and the Balkan mountain range (Stara Planina), the region of Sofia, Pirot and Vranje in the Morava valley, Northern Thrace, parts of Eastern Thrace and nearly all of Macedonia (Article 6).

Bulgaria would thus have had direct access to the Mediterranean. This carried the potential of Russian ships eventually using Bulgarian Mediterranean ports as naval bases, which the other Great Powers greatly disliked.

A prince elected by the people, approved by the Ottoman Empire, and recognized by the Great Powers was to take the helm of the country (Article 7). A council of Bulgarian noblemen was to draft a constitution (also Article 7). (They produced the Tarnovo Constitution.) Ottoman troops were to withdraw from Bulgaria, while Russian troops would remain for two more years (Article 8).

According to Philip Roeder, the Treaty of San Stefano "transformed" Bulgarian nationalism, turning it from a disunited movement into a united one.

=== Montenegro, Serbia, and Romania ===
Under the treaty, Montenegro more than doubled its territory, acquiring formerly Ottoman-controlled areas including the cities of Nikšić, Podgorica, and Bar (Article 1), and the Ottoman Empire recognized its independence (Article 2).

Serbia gained the cities of Niš and Leskovac in Moravian Serbia and became independent (Article 3).

Turkey recognized the independence of Romania (Article 5) while the latter gained Northern Dobruja from Russia (to which it was transferred from the Ottoman Empire) and ceded Southern Bessarabia in a forced exchange.

=== On Russia and the Ottoman Empire ===
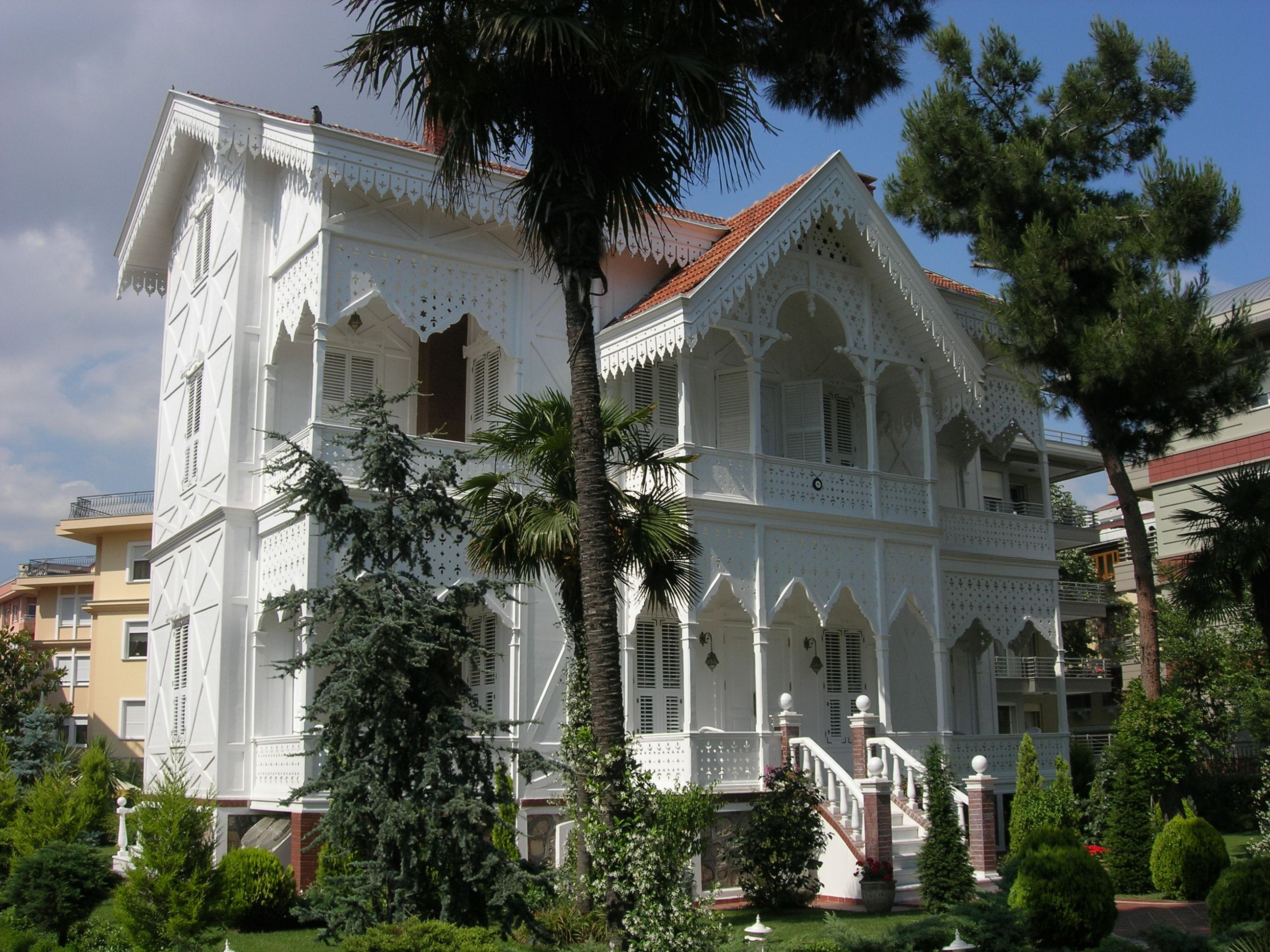
The Treaty was signed in this house of the Simenoğlu (Simeonoglou) family in Yeşilköy.

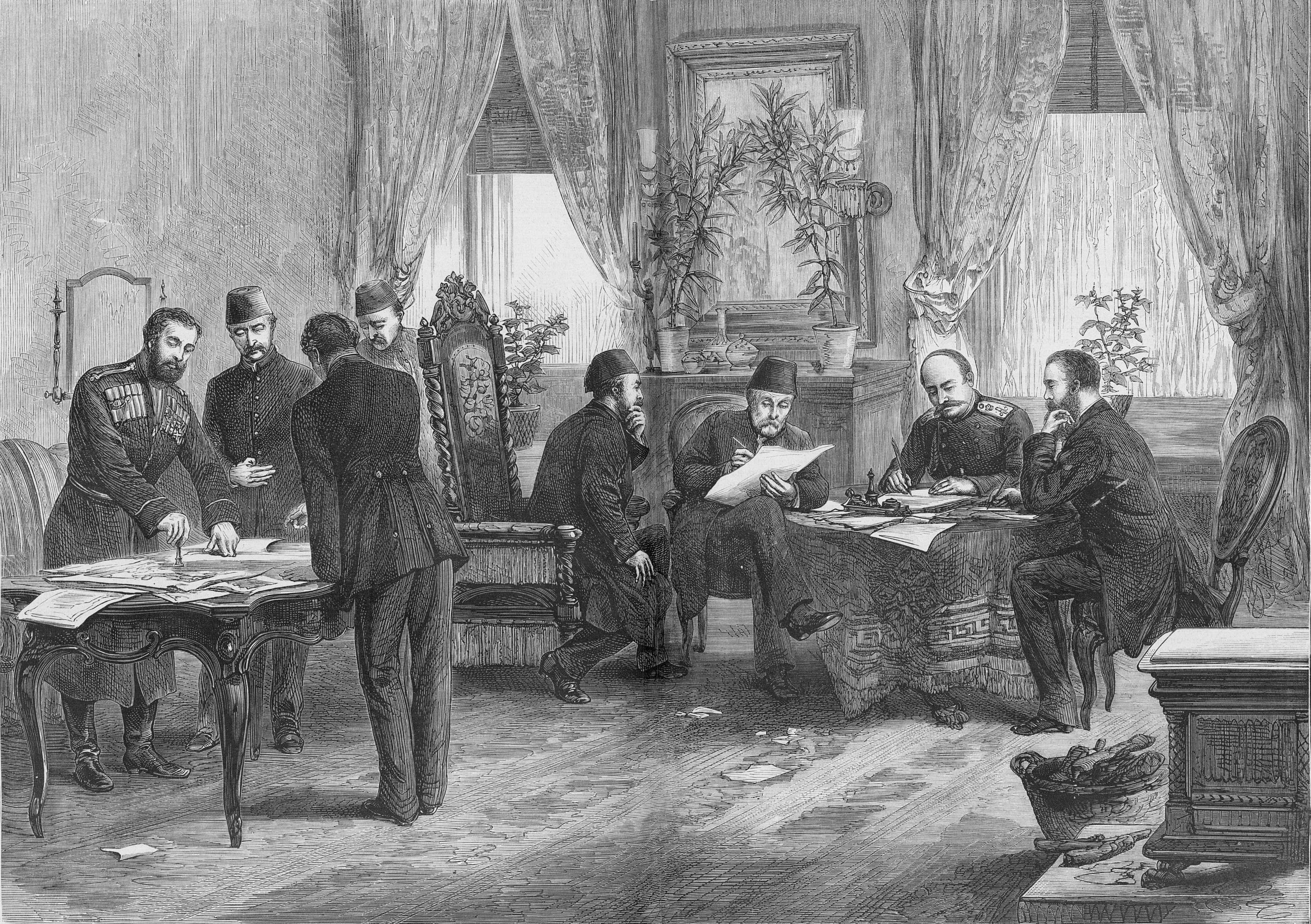
1878 Woodblock Print "Signing The Treaty of Peace Between Russia and Turkey At San Stefano, Near Constantinople."

In exchange for war reparations, the Sublime Porte ceded Armenian and Georgian territories in the Caucasus to Russia, including Ardahan, Artvin, Batum, Kars, Olti, Beyazit, and Alashkert. Additionally, it ceded Northern Dobruja, which Russia handed to Romania in exchange for Southern Bessarabia (Article 19).

Article 21 allowed the population living in areas conquered by Russia to sell property and immigrate to Turkey. The Treaty of Berlin kept a similar provision. Many Adjarians left Adjara at this time.

=== On other regions ===
The Vilayet of Bosnia (Bosnia and Herzegovina) was supposed to become an autonomous province (Article 14). Crete, Epirus and Thessaly were to receive a limited form of local self-government (Article 15), while the Ottomans vouched for their earlier-given promises to handle reforms in Armenia in order to protect the Armenians from abuse (Article 16). The Straits—the Bosporus and the Dardanelles—were declared open to all neutral ships in war and peacetime (Article 24).

The Circassians of the newly liberated Balkan territories, who had been settled there in 1864 following the Circassian genocide and had committed several atrocities against the Christian population of the region during the war, were to be expelled. This way, the Circassian minority in Dobruja disappeared.

== Reaction ==
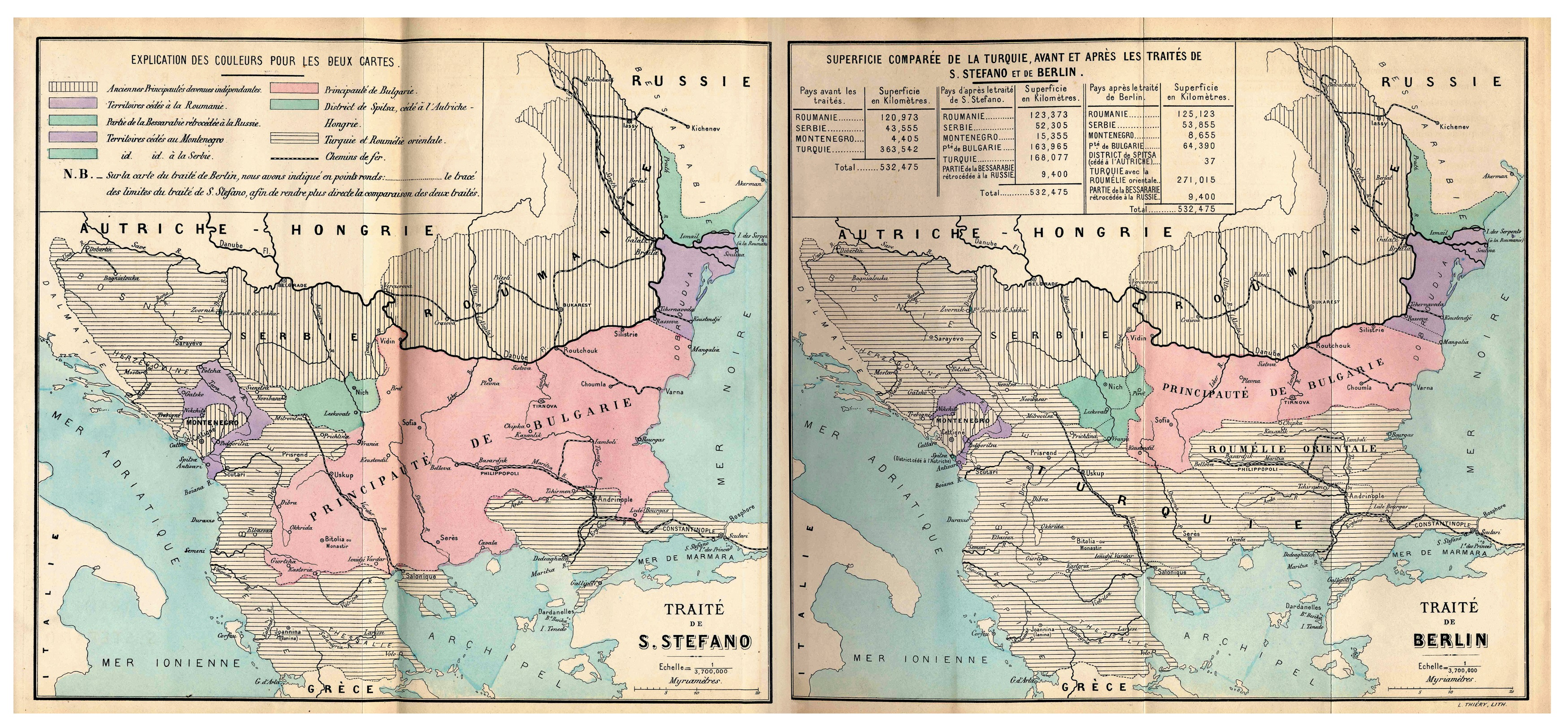
Maps of the region after the Treaty of San Stefano and the Congress of Berlin of 1878

The Great Powers, especially British Prime Minister Benjamin Disraeli, were unhappy with this extension of Russian power, and Serbia feared that the establishment of Greater Bulgaria would harm its interests in the former and remaining Ottoman territories. These reasons prompted the Great Powers to obtain a revision of the treaty at the Congress of Berlin, and substitute it with the Treaty of Berlin.

Romania, which had contributed significantly to the Russian victory in the war, was extremely disappointed by the treaty, and the Romanian public perceived some of its stipulations as Russia breaking the Russo-Romanian pre-war treaties that guaranteed the integrity of Romanian territory.

Austria-Hungary was disappointed with the treaty as it failed to expand its influence in Bosnia and Herzegovina.

The Albanians, whose provinces were controlled by the Ottoman Empire, objected to the significant loss of their territory to Serbia, Bulgaria, and Montenegro and realized they would have to organize nationally to attract the assistance of foreign powers seeking to neutralize Russia's influence in the region. The implications of the treaty led to the formation of the League of Prizren.

In the "Salisbury Circular" of 1 April 1878, the British Foreign Secretary Robert Cecil, made clear his and his government's objections to the Treaty of San Stefano and the favorable position in which it left Russia.

According to British historian A. J. P. Taylor, writing in 1954:

"If the treaty of San Stefano had been maintained, both the Ottoman Empire and Austria-Hungary might have survived to the present day. The British, except for Beaconsfield [Disraeli] in his wilder moments, had expected less and were therefore less disappointed. Salisbury wrote at the end of 1878 'We shall set up a rickety sort of Turkish rule again south of the Balkans. But it is a mere respite. There is no vitality left in them.'"

Since 1990, a number of historians, publicists and journalists in Bulgaria have subjected the Treaty of San Stefano and the entire policy of the Russian Empire on the Eastern question in the 19th century to critical re-evaluation. They argue that the liberation of the Bulgarians was used only as a stepping stone for the subjugation of "Turkish Slavs" and an eventual claim to Constantinople.

== Gallery ==
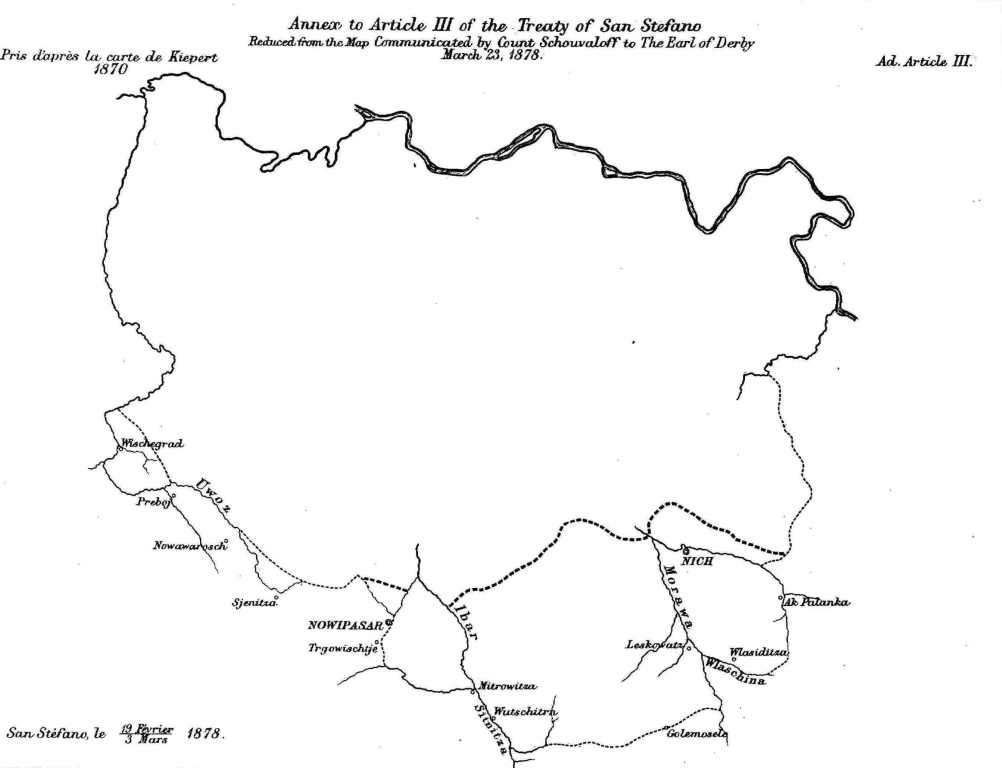
Annex to the Treaty of San Stefano, showing the change of Serbia's borders.

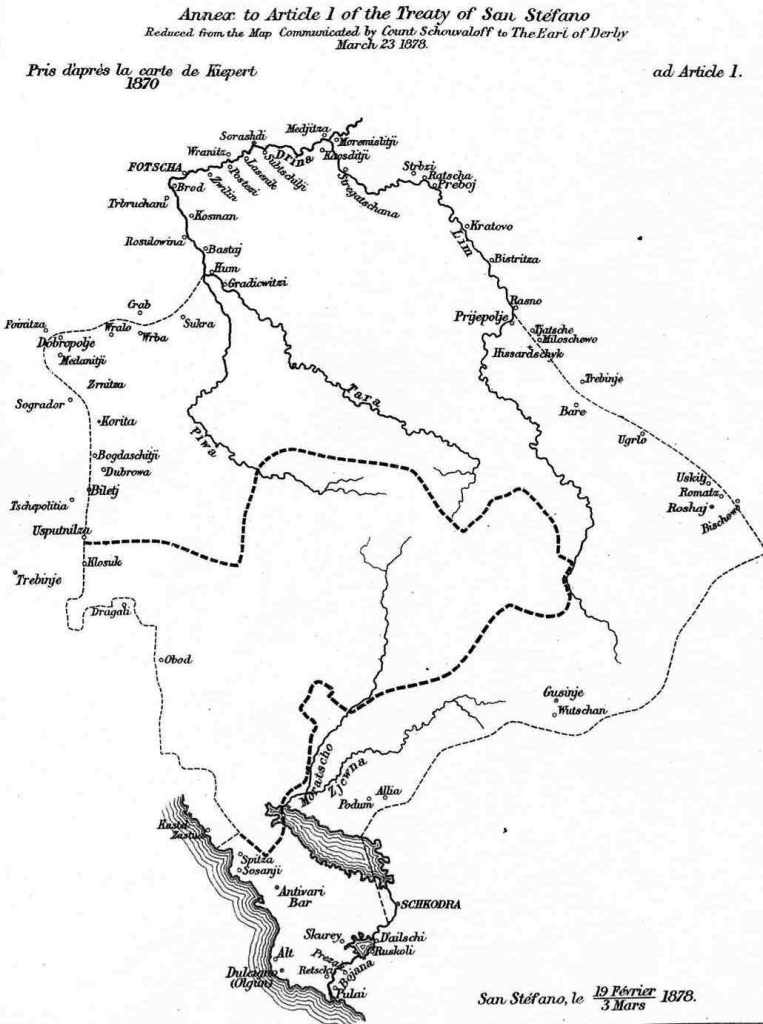
Annex to the Treaty of San Stefano, showing the change of Montenegro's borders.

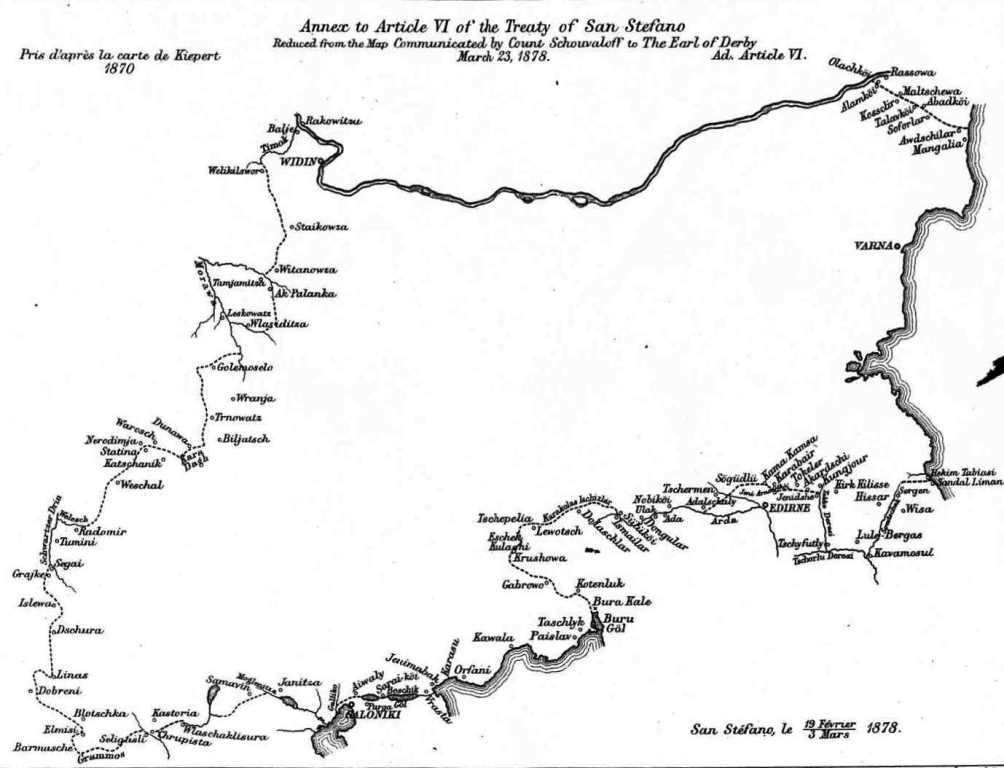
Annex to the Treaty of San Stefano, showing the borders of the new Principality of Bulgaria.

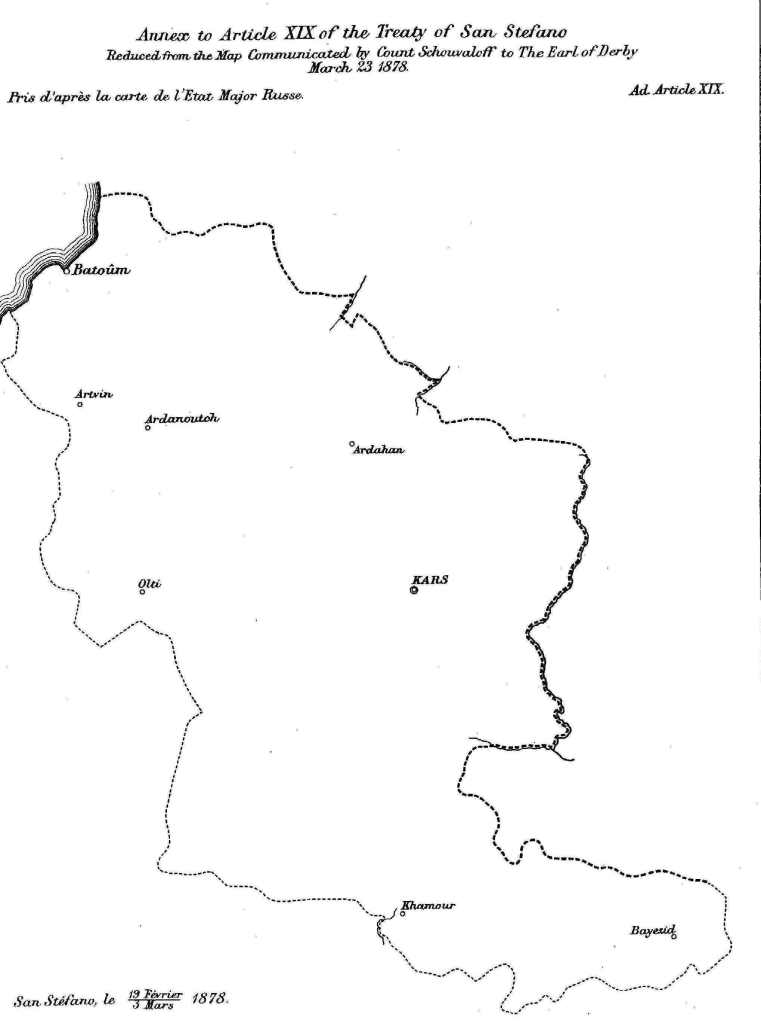
Annex to the Treaty of San Stefano, showing the change of the border between the Russian and the Ottoman Empire in the Caucasus.

== In popular culture ==
The circumstances leading to the signing of the Treaty of San Stefano are depicted in Boris Akunin's historical novel The Turkish Gambit. Akunin in general sticks to known historical facts, though he attributes some acts to fictional characters such as his recurrent protagonist Erast Fandorin.

== See also ==
- Treaty of Berlin (1878)
- Bulgarian irredentism
- History of Bulgaria
- The Russian Monument at San Stefano
- Demolition of the Monument at San Stefano
