= Russian Monument at San Stefano =

Former building in the Ottoman Empire (1898–1914)

Coordinates: 40°57′44″N 28°48′38″E

- Храм-усыпальница русских воинов
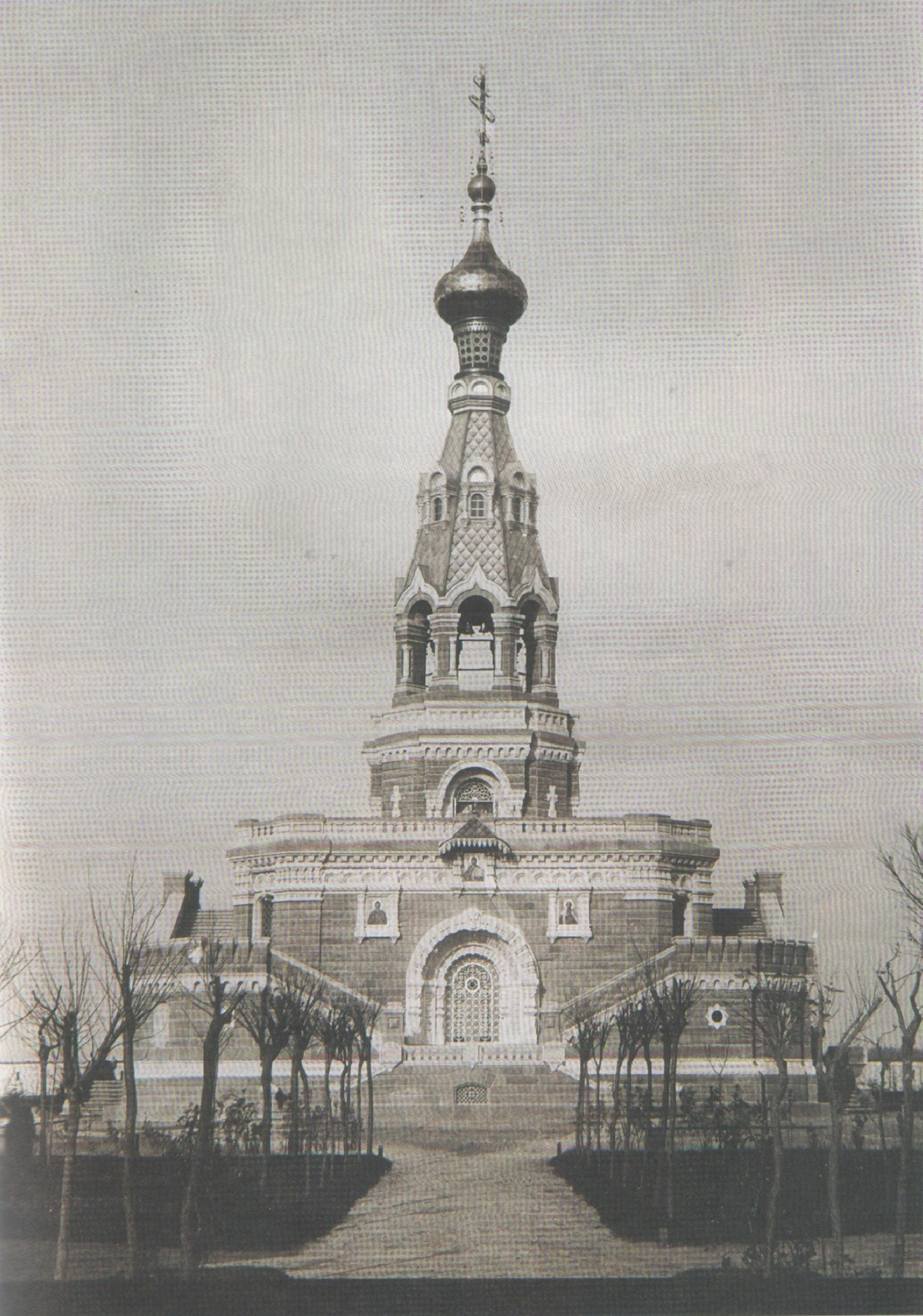
- Interactive map of the Russian Monument at San Stefano area

General information
- Architectural style: Russian Revival architecture
- Location: San Stefano, Ottoman Empire (present-day Yeşilköy, Turkey)
- Year built: 1895-1898
- Demolished: 14 November 1914
- Owner: Russian Orthodoxy

Technical details
- Material: Granite and white French stone
- Grounds: six acres

Design and construction
- Architect: Vladimir Suslov?

The Russian Monument at San Stefano (Russian: Храм-усыпальница русских воинов, lit. 'Temple Mausoleum of Russian Soldiers', Turkish: Ayastefanos Rus Abidesi) was a mausoleum and memorial with a chapel built by the Russian Empire in the village of San Stefano (now Yeşilköy, a neighborhood of Istanbul) between 1895 and 1898 to honor Russian soldiers who died in the Russo-Turkish War of 1877-1878. In 1914, during World War I, the Ottoman Empire declared Jihad against Russia, and Ismail Enver Pasha ordered the monument's demolition. This event was famously captured on film by Fuat Uzkınay in "Demolition of the Monument at San Stefano", the oldest known Turkish-made film.

== History ==
=== Construction & Architecture ===
The Russian Monument at San Stefano was built to honor the Russian soldiers who died in the Russo-Turkish War of 1877-1878. Covering six acres, it stood on a hill overlooking San Stefano (now Yeşilköy, a neighborhood of Istanbul) and combined elements of Orthodox church architecture with a militaristic commemorative style. Its construction began in 1895, being completed in 1898. The structure featured a crenelated wall. It was built from grey rough-dressed granite, accented with white French stone. At its base lied a charnel house where the remains of 5,000 Russian soldiers were interred. Above this, a chapel was crowned with a campanile and a towering spire. The main entrance was adorned with a painting of Christ, flanked by images of Vladimir the Great and Alexander Nevsky. While its exact designer remains uncertain, Russian sources attribute the monument to Vladimir Sulsov, whereas Turkish records mention an architect named "Bozarov".

=== Demolition & Film ===
On November 14, 1914, as the Ottoman Empire entered World War I and declared Jihad against Russia, Ismail Enver Pasha, as part of the Committee of Union and Progress (CUP), commanded the demolition of the monument, viewing it as an unwelcome reminder of a past defeat; the Ottoman army carried out the destruction with dynamite.

26-year-old Fuat Uzkinay was assigned to film the demolition using a camera from Vienna by the CUP, beginning his filmmaking career. The film, "Demolition of the Monument at San Stefano", supposedly documented the church before, during, and after its destruction, but no copies, only a few photographs, of the event remain, leading some researchers to question whether it was ever actually made or if only photographs existed. The last known copy is believed to have been lost around 1941, Despite this uncertainty, the film is considered the first Turkish film and was later embraced in the 1940s as the foundation of a national cinema in the Republican narrative.

== Gallery ==
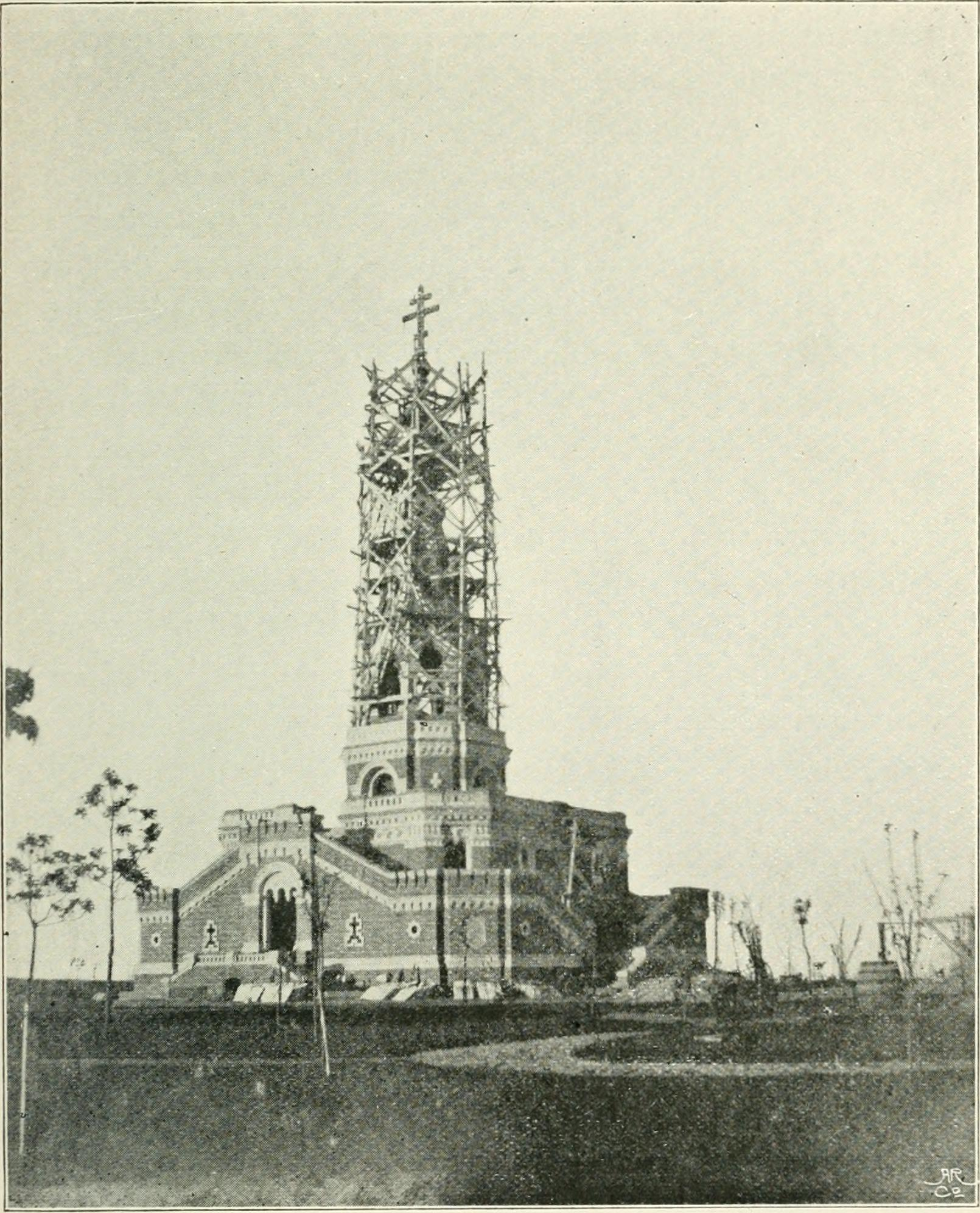
The monument during its construction

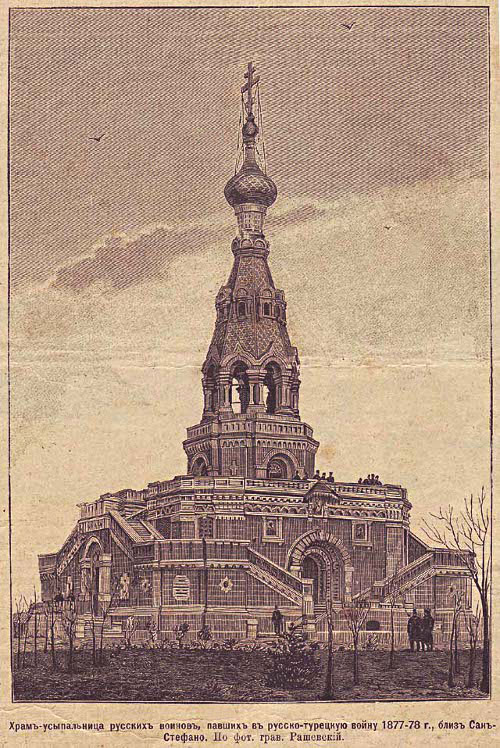
Side view of the monument

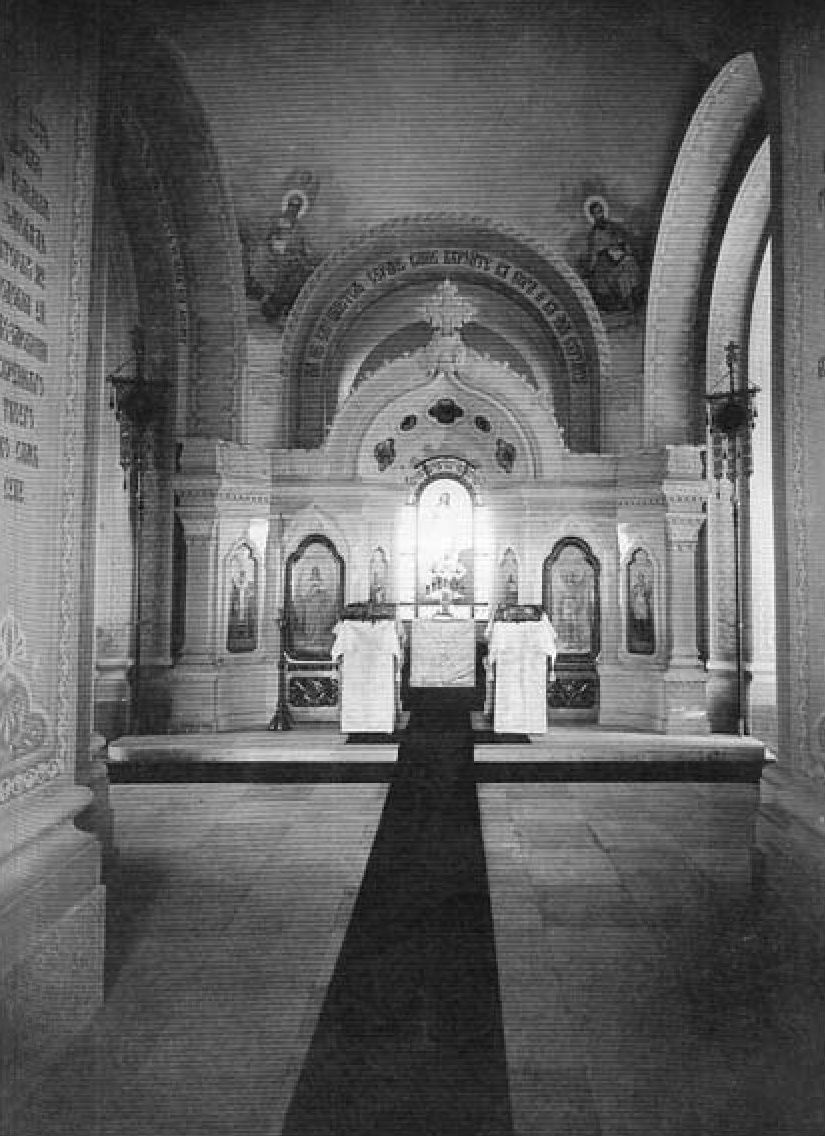
Inside the monument's chapel

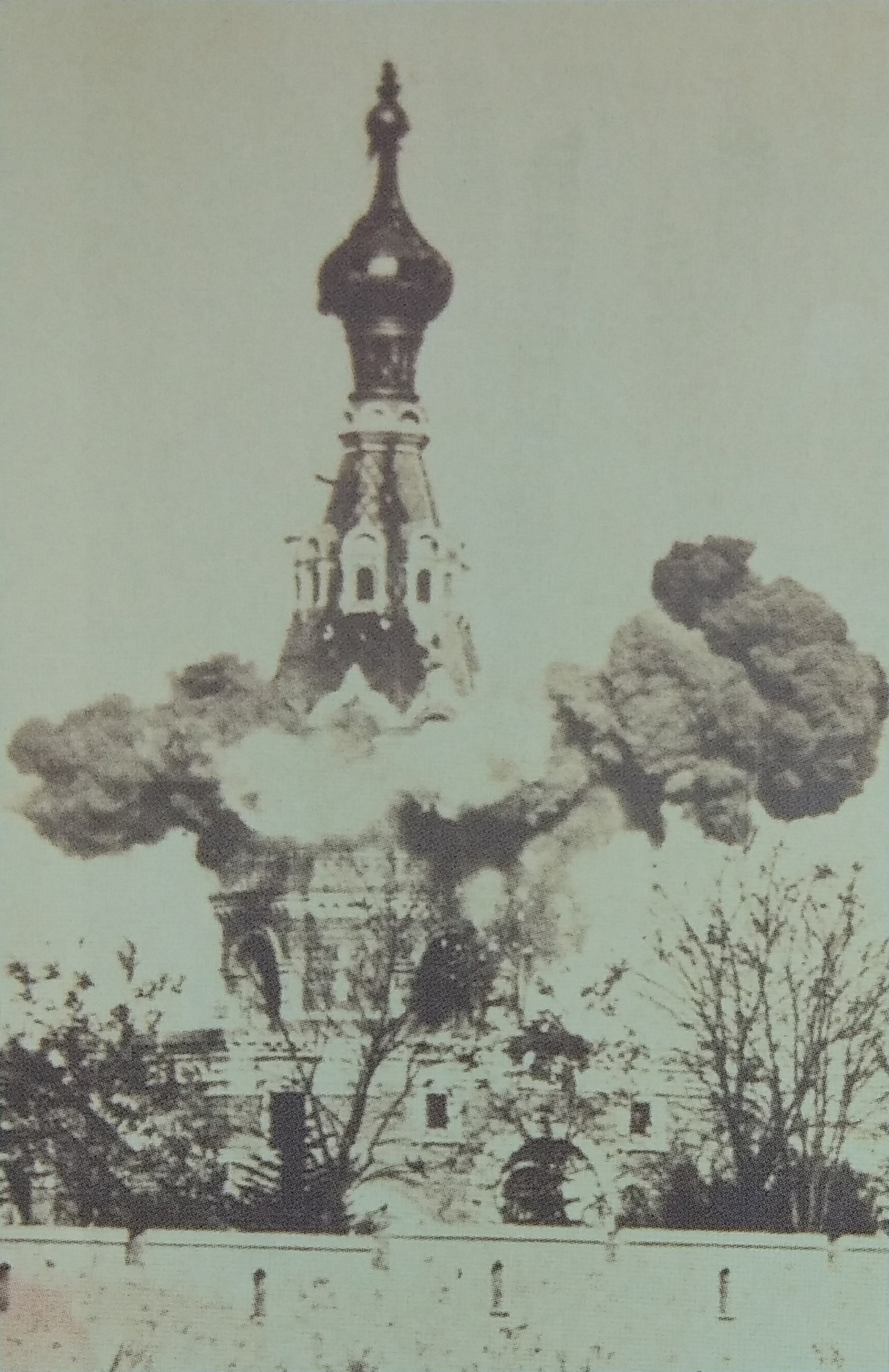
The bell tower being dynamited

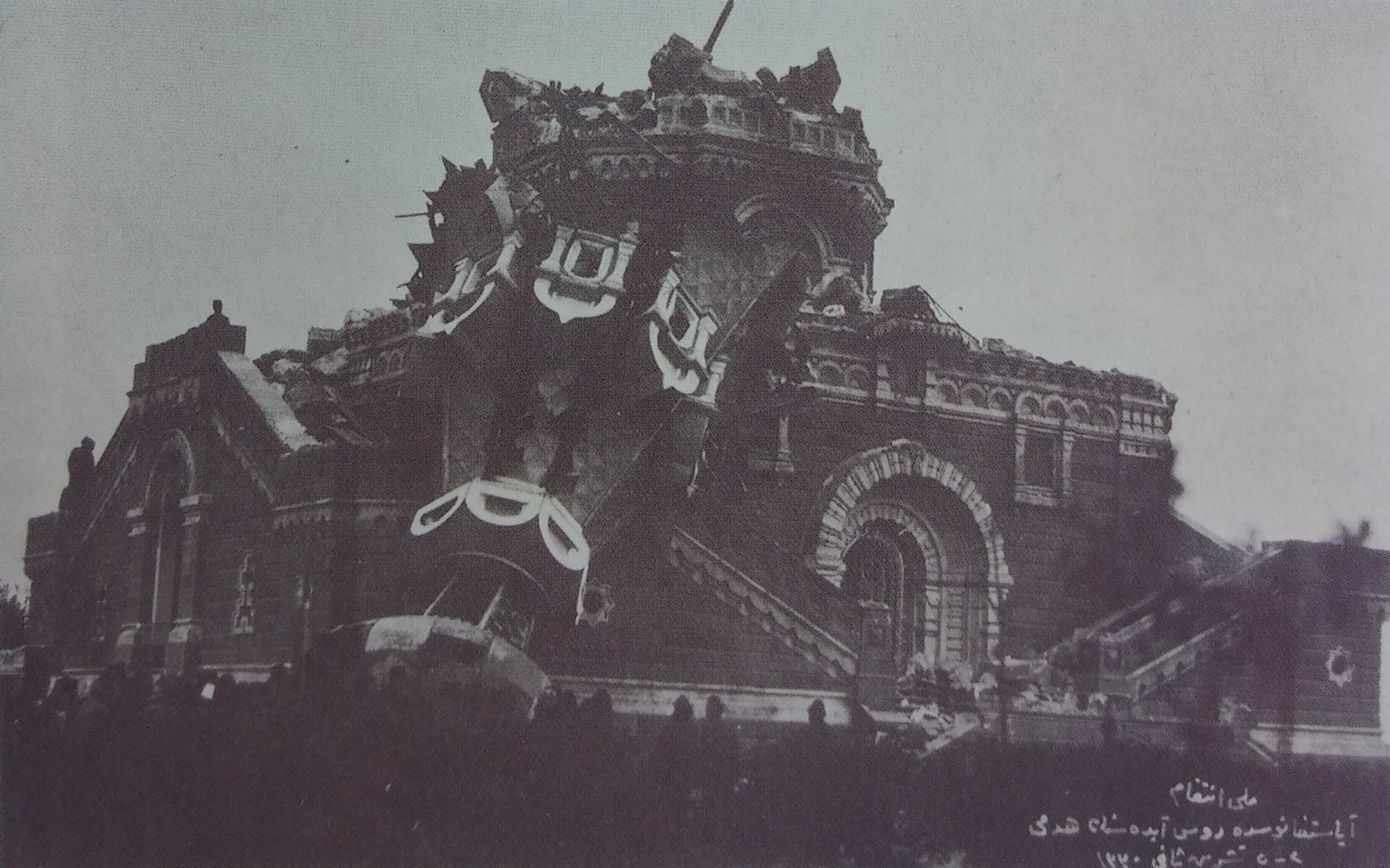
After the tower was blown up

The monument's cross in the National Historical Museum, Sofia, Bulgaria

== See also ==
- Russo-Turkish War of 1877-1878
- Treaty of San Stefano
- Demolition of the Monument at San Stefano
