= Demolition of the Monument at San Stefano =

1914 film by Fuat Uzkınay

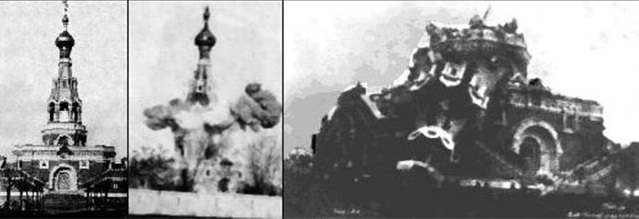
- Directed by: Fuat Uzkınay
- Produced by: Ottoman Army
- Release date: 14 November 1914

Demolition of the Monument at San Stefano (Turkish: Ayastefanos'taki Rus Abidesinin Yıkılışı, Ottoman Turkish: مسقوف هيكلنك تخريبى, romanized: Moskof Heykelinin Tahrîbi, lit. 'Ruination of the Muscovite Monument') is a 1914 Turkish documentary film directed by former army officer Fuat Uzkınay. It is the oldest known Turkish-made film.

The subject of the documentary was the demolition of the Russian Monument at San Stefano (present-day Yeşilköy, Istanbul) after the Russo-Turkish War (1877–1878), which ended with the Treaty of San Stefano (following the Congress of Berlin in 1878 it was superseded by the Treaty of Berlin). The reason for the monument's demolition was the declaration of war between the Ottoman Empire and Russian Empire in 1914, during World War I and thus the demolition of the monument was ordered by Enver Pasha.

The last surviving copy of the film is believed to have been lost around 1941 and no known copies exist today in archives. Only a number of photos of the event have survived.
