= Dadian family =

Ottoman Armenian family

The Dadian family (Western Armenian: Դադյաններ; Turkish: Dadyan ailesi) was an Ottoman Armenian family that was famous for their industrial activities within the Ottoman Empire. Besides being prominent factory owners (the family had a monopoly on the empire's gunpowder industry for more than a century), members of the family also served as political advisers. The Dadians were also well acquainted with Ottoman banking.

Ohannes Dadian was the director of the gunpowder factory in 1845.
