= Fuat Uzkınay =

Turkish filmmaker (1888–1956)

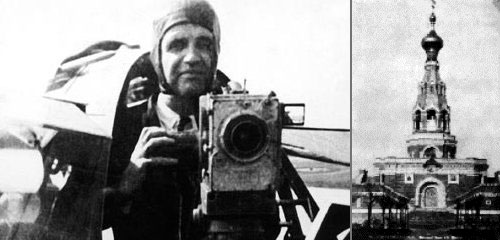
Fuat Uzkınay and the Russian Monument at San Stefano

Fuat Uzkınay (1888–29 March 1956) was the first Turkish filmmaker.

After finishing Istanbul Highschool, he took physics and chemistry classes at Istanbul University. While he started to work at a high school as a principal, there was a growing interest in cinema among the Ottomans. Uzkınay started to give lessons at his school in order to make his students familiar with cinema. Despite the fact that numerous cinemas existed in Istanbul, Uzkınay campaigned for the building of a Turkish-owned cinema, which opened on 19 March 1914. The name, "The National Cinema", would change later to "Ali Efendi sineması". Meanwhile, he learned to use the projector from Sigmund Weinberg, who was the first man to introduce the cinema to the Ottomans.

While in the army, on 14 November 1914 he made the documentary film "Ayastefanos'taki Rus Abidesinin Yıkılışı", depicting the destruction of the Russian Monument at Ayastefanos. This 150mt. film is known as the first documentary film of the Turkish Cinema. One year later, he founded, on the order of General Enver Paşa, the "Central Army Cinema Department". Sigmund Weinberg was the Chairman of the department and Uzkınay was his assistant. One year later, Uzkınay succeeded Weinberg in that position.

He received education in Germany on film production. He completed his first movie "Himmet Ağa'nın İzdivacı" in 1918, despite many difficulties he encountered. In 1954, he retired from the Turkish army and died in 1956 at his home in Istanbul.

== Filmography (Director) ==
- Victory of İzmir - İzmir Zaferi / İstiklal - 1942
- At the road of Victory - Zafer Yollarında - 1923
- The marriage of Himmet - Himmet Ağa'nın İzdivacı - 1918
- Leblebici Horhor Ağa - 1916
- Ayastefanos'taki Rus Abidesinin Yıkılışı- The destruction of Russian Monumental at Ayestefanos - 1914

== Filmography (Producer) ==
- Bican Efendi Mektep Hocası - 1921
- Bican Efendi'nin Rüyası - 1921
- Binnaz - 1919
- Mürebbiye - 1919
- Himmet Ağa'nın İzdivacı - 1918
- Bican Efendi Vekilharç - 1917

== Filmography (D.O.P.) ==
- Boğaziçi Esrarı / Nur Baba - 1922
- Bican Efendi Mektep Hocası - 1921
- Bican Efendi'nin Rüyası - 1921
- Binnaz - 1919
- Mürebbiye - 1919
- Tombul Aşığın Dört Sevgilisi - 1919
- Himmet Ağa'nın İzdivacı - 1918
- Bican Efendi Vekilharç - 1917
- Ayastefanos'taki Rus Abidesinin Yıkılışı - 1914

== Filmography (Screenplay) ==
- Zafer Yollarında - 1923

== See also ==
- Cinema of Turkey
