= Fedino =

Fedino Федино
- Village
- Location within Ivanovo Oblast Location within Russia
- Coordinates: 56°53′N 40°41′E
- Country: Russia
- Region: Ivanovo Oblast
- District: Teykovsky District
- Time zone: UTC+3:00

Fedino (Russian: Федино) is a rural locality (a village) in Teykovsky District, Ivanovo Oblast, Russia. Population: 17 (2010 census);

== Geography ==
This rural locality is located 11 kilometres (6.8 mi) from Teykovo (the district's administrative centre), 20 kilometres (12 mi) from Ivanovo (capital of Ivanovo Oblast) and 226 kilometres (140 mi) from Moscow. Berlovo is the nearest rural locality.
