= Dekaton (Bithynia) =

Town in ancient Bithynia

Coordinates: 40°43′16″N 30°05′51″E

Dekaton (Ancient Greek: Δέκατον) was a settlement and station of ancient Bithynia on the road east of Nicomedia, 10 Roman miles east of Nicomedia, whence the name.

Its site is located nearly 10 Roman miles east of Nicomedia in Asiatic Turkey.
