= Yeşilköy =

Neighbourhood in the district of Bakırköy, Istanbul, Turkey

Yeşilköy San Stefano
- Neighbourhood
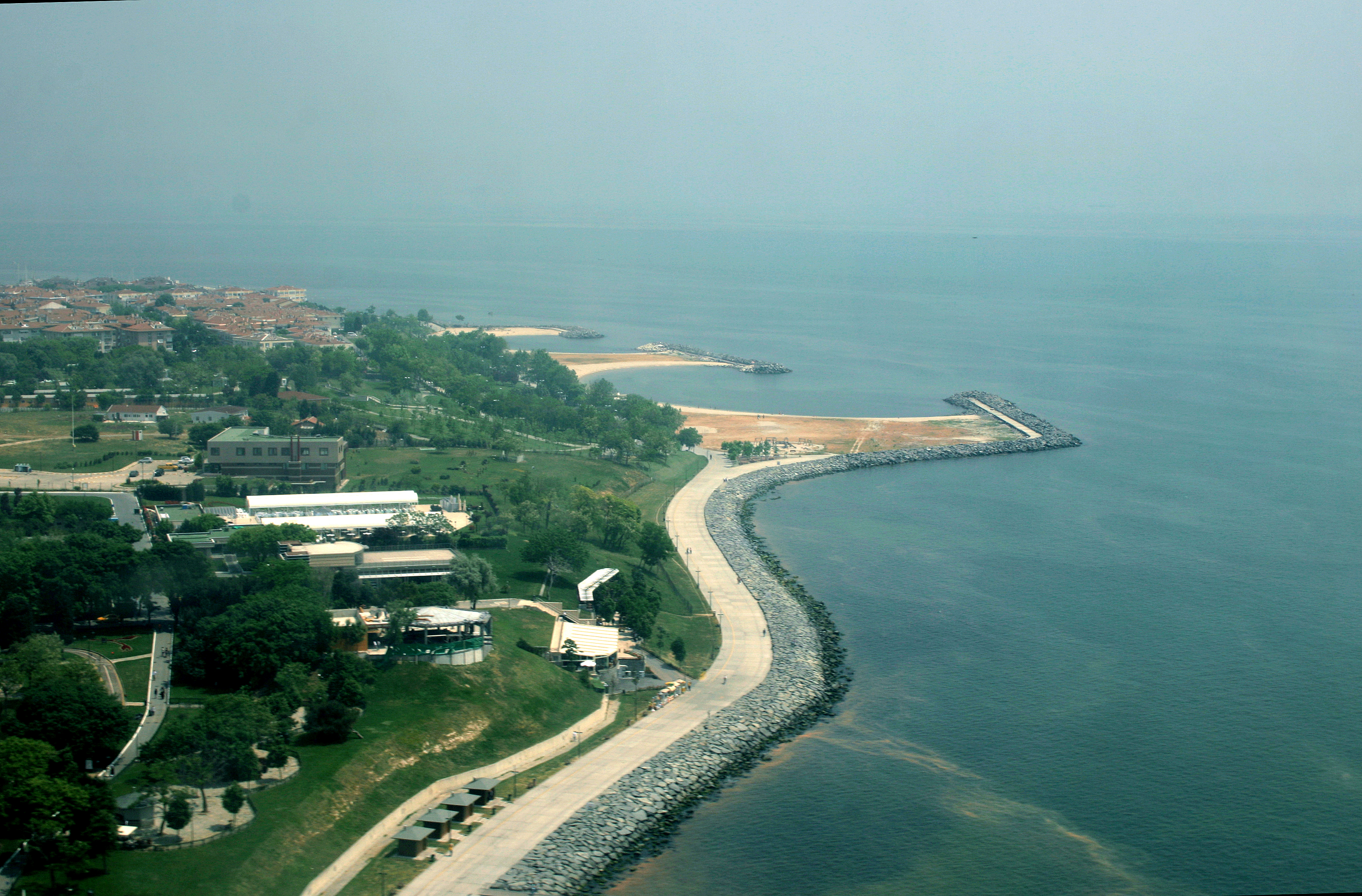
- Aerial view of the Yeşilköy (San Stefano) seafront

- Location within Turkey Location within Istanbul
- Coordinates: 40°57′34″N 28°49′31″E
- Country: Turkey
- Province: Istanbul
- District: Bakırköy
- Population (2022): 25,039
- Time zone: UTC+3 (TRT)

Yeşilköy (Turkish pronunciation: [jeˈʃilcœj]; meaning "Green Village" is an affluent neighbourhood (Turkish: mahalle) in the municipality and district of Bakırköy, Istanbul Province, Turkey. Its population is 25,039 (2022). on the Marmara Sea about 11 kilometres (7 mi) west of Istanbul's historic city centre. Prior to the rapid increase of Istanbul's population in the 1970s, Yeşilköy was a secluded village and sea resort.

== Location ==
The mahalle is located along the Marmara Sea about 11 kilometres west of Istanbul's historical center. It is bordered by the districts of Yeşilyurt to the east, Ataköy to the northeast, Florya to the west, and the district of Küçükçekmece to the north. The western part of the district is called Çiroz.

== Etymology ==
The original name, San Stefano, in use until 1926, derives from a legend: in the early 13th century, the ship carrying Saint Stephen's relics to Rome from Constantinople, sacked by the crusaders of the Fourth Crusade, was forced to stop here because of a storm. The relics were taken to a church until the sea calmed, and this gave the name to the church and to the place. In 1926, the village was named Yeşilköy which means "Green Village" in Turkish. It is believed that the writer Halit Ziya Uşakligil who lived there at the time gave this new name to the village.

== History ==
In 1203, the beach of Agios Stefanos had been the site of disembarkation of the Latin army of the Fourth Crusade, which would conquer Constantinople the following year.

In the 19th century, the whole village was owned by the prominent Armenian Dadian family.

During the Crimean War, French forces were stationed here and built one of the three historic lighthouses of Istanbul still in use. San Stefano was where in 1878 the Russian forces halted their advance towards Constantinople at the end of the Russo-Turkish War and was the location where the Treaty of San Stefano was signed between the Russian and Turkish Empires. In 1909, the decision to send Sultan Abdülhamid II into exile to Thessaloniki was taken by the members of the Committee of Union and Progress at the yacht club of San Stefano.

On 10 July 1894, San Stefano – as with the whole Marmara region of Constantinople – was hit by a strong earthquake, followed by a tsunami. The sea receded 100 metres from the shore and the following tsunami created giant waves which devastated the coast. The boathouse, the docks and large wooden structures were damaged, many houses were destroyed or damaged and also the train track was severely damaged by the quake.

San Stefano was where the first aviation facilities were built in the Ottoman Empire in 1912 and an aviation school was set up and later developed by German officers to train pilots for the Ottoman Aviation Squadrons.

In 1912, during the Balkan Wars, thousands of soldiers suffering from cholera were brought here, and about 3,000 of them died and were buried near the train station.

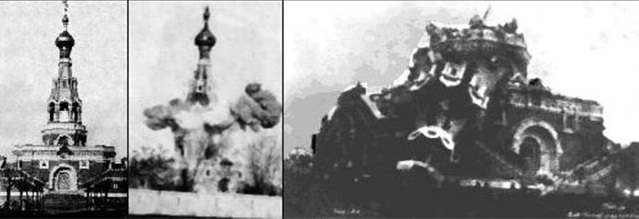
The demolition of the Russian Monument at San Stefano in November 1914

Shortly after the Ottomans' entry into the First World War as Germany's ally, on 14 November 1914, a monument erected here in 1898 to commemorate the Russian soldiers who died in 1878, was blown up by the Ottoman military as a propaganda event; the demolition is thought to have been filmed by the first Turkish filmmaker Fuat Uzkınay and thus is officially deemed to be the birth of Turkish cinema. During the bombings of Istanbul, the area was affected several times by the British bombs.

== Society ==
=== Demographics ===
Beginning in the late 1800s, San Stefano was a favourite coastal resort and hunting place for Constantinople's upper classes. Until the beginning of the 20th century, the village had a predominantly Christian population. It had a mixed population, composed of Turks, Greeks (now almost completely gone), Armenians and Levantines (Italian and French people, now mostly gone). The legacy of its once cosmopolitan character is present: an Italian mission, an Italian Catholic church and cemetery, an Armenian Apostolic Church and a few Greek churches still exist in the area, with the Armenians and Italians of the district still frequenting their churches. The Kurds and the Assyrians, faithful of the Syriac Orthodox Church, who have emigrated to Istanbul since the second half of the 20th century from eastern and southeastern Turkey, are relatively more recent newcomers. In 2015, the Syriac Orthodox community got permission to build a Syriac Orthodox Church in this part of the city, for their 15,000 members in Istanbul, where not only the large majority of Turkey's Assyrians live, but also the majority of Istanbul's Assyrians. On 3 August 2019, in the presence of the Patriarch of the Syriac Church, of Patriarch Bartholomew and of Istanbul Mayor Ekrem İmamoğlu, President Erdoğan laid in Yeşilköy the first stone of the Mor Ephrem Syriac Orthodox Church, the first church erected in Turkey since the foundation of the republic. The area chosen for the construction is a part of the ground of the ancient Levantine cemetery. The church was finished in 2023 and was inaugurated by Erdoğan on 8 October 2023.

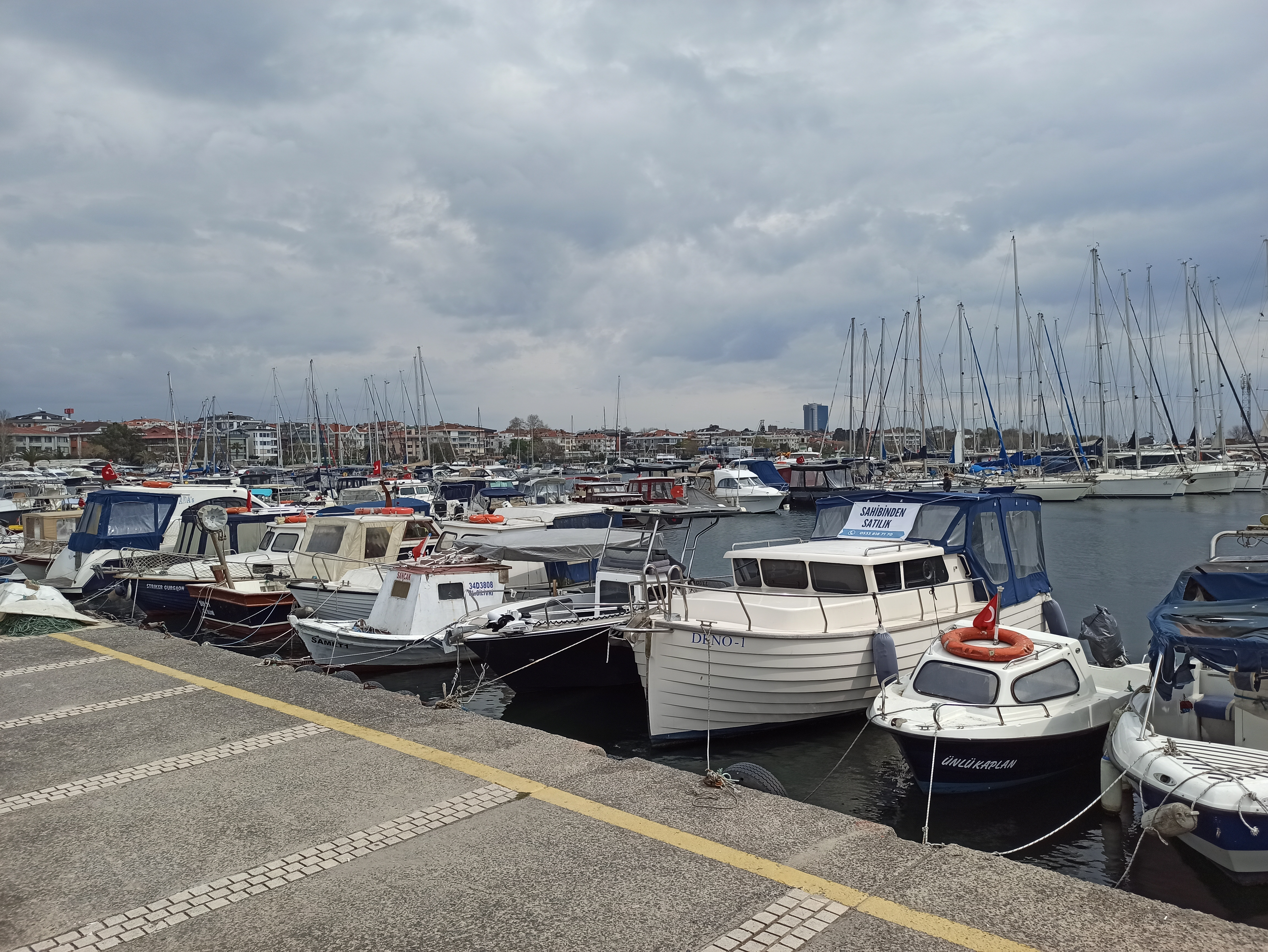
The Marina of Yeşilköy

=== Religious traditions ===
In the Greek Orthodox Church of Aghios Stephanos on 26 December each year (Saint's Day), the ceremony named Thysias (Ancient Greek: Θυσίας) is celebrated. Several previously bought sheep are sacrificed in the church garden and the meat is distributed to the poor and needy. The ceremony is attended by Greeks from Yeşilköy (including several emigrants) and other districts of Istanbul. The ceremony commemorates the forced landing of the ship carrying the Saint's bones at the village. The crew, bound for Rome and forced to land due to a storm, kept the relics for 10-12 days under a tent erected at the future church, and during this time the villagers fed the sailors by slaughtering sheep from their flocks.

== Landmarks ==
=== Secular landmarks ===
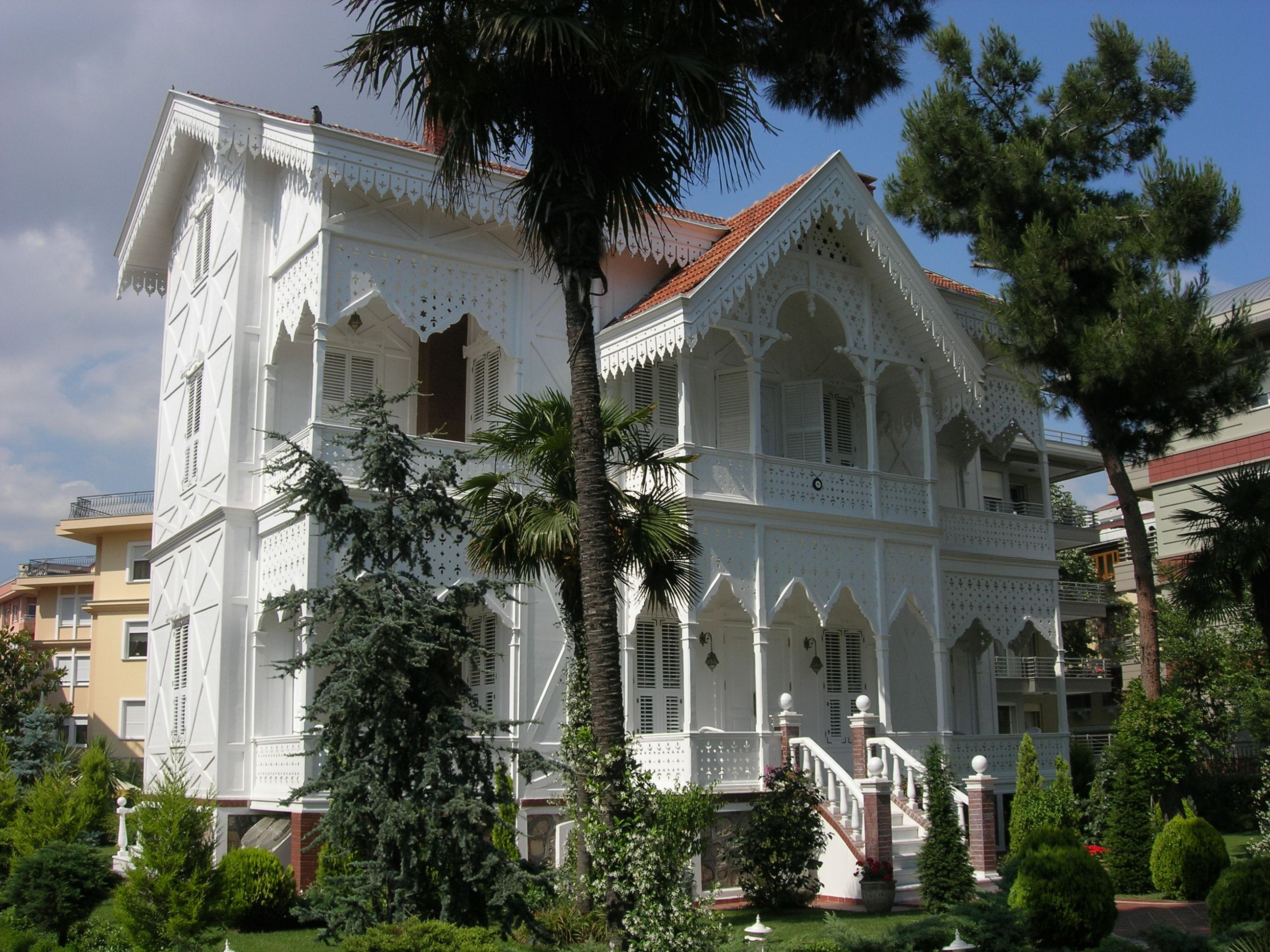
The Treaty of San Stefano was signed in this house of the Simenoğlu (Simeonoglou) family. Note the nazar, or eye-like charm, on the upper balcony.

Yeşilköy retains some remarkable examples of Art Nouveau wooden houses, built in the late 19th and early 20th century. Among them:

==== Crespin House ====
The house, which is one of the oldest residences in Yeşilköy, is now a boutique hotel serving mainly foreign tourists. The objects decorating the lobby do not come from the Crespins, but from the collection of the current owners. Edouard Crespin's father, one of Yeşilköy's best-known personalities, came to Bursa as Consul representing the King of France during the reign of Mahmud II. When he retired, he stayed in Bursa and started the silk trade. His son Edouard Crespin settled in Yeşilköy and built the house, located at Istanbul Caddesi 29.

==== Semprini Houses ====
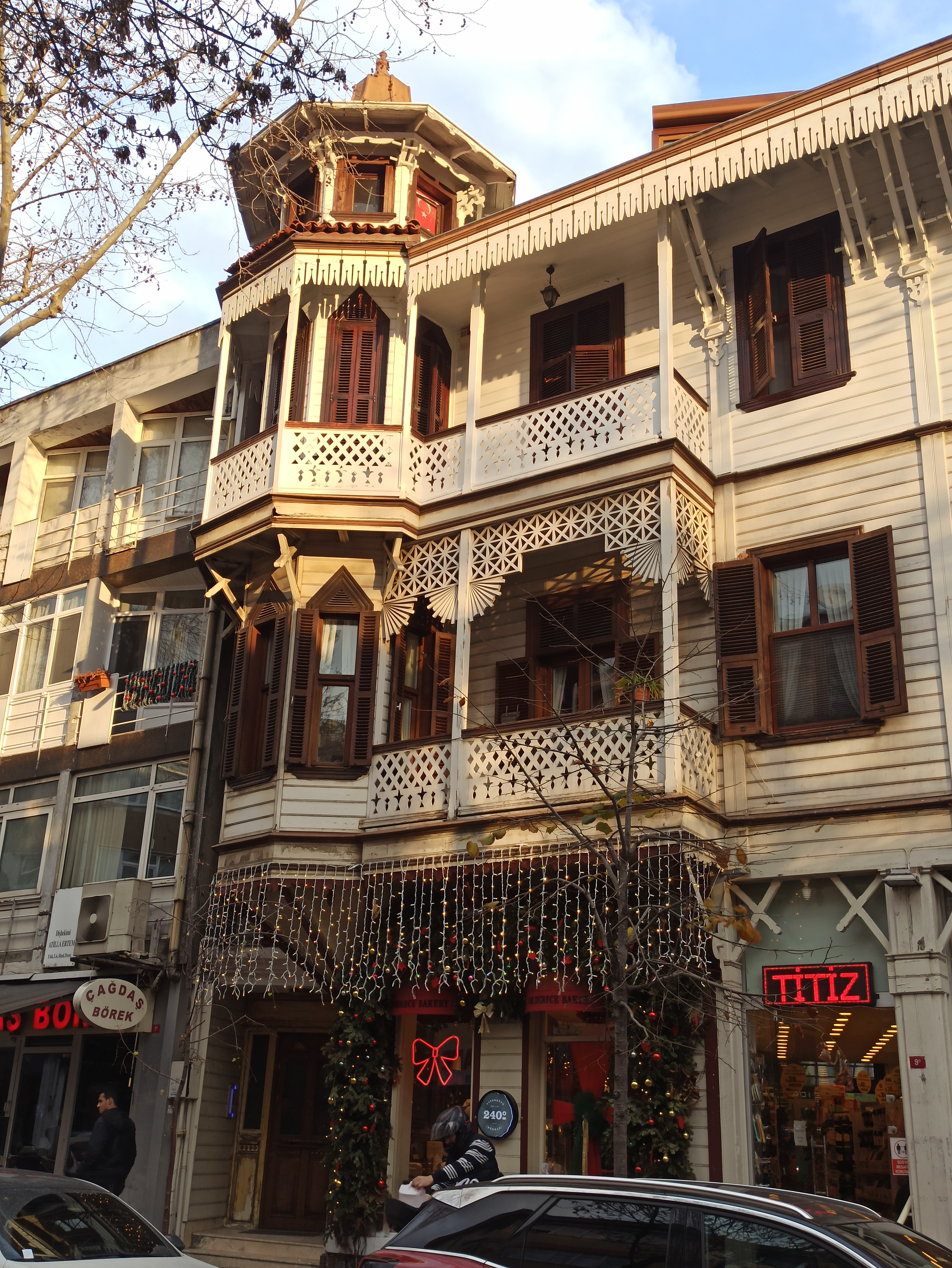
Detail of the Semprini Houses along Istasyon Caddesi

Among the historical buildings in Yeşilköy are three townhouses built in 1900 on Istasyon Caddesi by Guglielmo Semprini, a famous Levantine architect of Italian origin, who designed many works in Istanbul, and is best known for the Grand Hotel de Londres in Tepebaşı, Taksim.

=== Religious landmarks ===
The district contains a mosque and four notable churches (Greek Orthodox, Armenian, Roman Catholic and Syriac). The first three churches are dedicated to St Stephen, the last to St Ephrem. Moreover, the quarter hosts also one of the few Ayazma still in use in Istanbul.

==== Mecidiye Mosque ====
The mosque, the first built in the locality, is the Mecidiye cami (dedicated to the Order of the Medjidie, an Ottoman order) and was built to the design of the Ottoman architect Mimar Kemaleddin in the years between the end of the reign of Mehmed V and the beginning of the Republic.

==== Agios Stephanos Greek Orthodox Church ====
The church, possibly built where important personalities in Yeşilköy's history have been buried, is located on Mirasyedi Sokak. The current structure, which bears parts of the first church built in the Byzantine period on its façade, was built in 1845. Its exterior dimensions are 22.31 x 13.75 metres, while its height is about 10.5 metres. The church has a basilica plan with three naves. The bell tower was built later. The small icons in the upper part of the iconostasis contain episodes from the life of Jesus Christ, while the larger ones in the lower part contain, from left to right, depictions of St. Stephen, Mary and the Infant Jesus, Jesus Christ and John the Baptist.

==== Surp Stepanos Armenian Church ====
The church, located on Inci Ciceǧi Sokak, was built in 1844 under the leadership of Bogos Bey, a member of the Dadyan family, and still serves Yeşilköy's large Armenian community today. The gate to the complex, which is separated from the street by a high wall, is noteworthy. In the 1870s, a school, still active today, was built next to the church.

==== Santo Stefano Roman Catholic Church ====
The church, the construction of which was started in 1865 according to the design of architect Pietro Vitalis, and finished in 1886, is located on Cumbuṣ Sokak. The first building collapsed in the earthquake of 1894, and was replaced by a new temple. The wooden ceiling was made with Austrian craftsmen and materials. On the façade there are three noteworthy statues from France. Also worth seeing is the painting on the altar depicting the stoning of St. Stephen. During the Marmara earthquake of 1894, the living quarters at the back of the church were damaged and rebuilt. The lower floor of the building in which the restaurant is located, directly opposite the church, was used by the financial affairs office of the Russian army during the 1877 war.

==== Saint Ephrem Orthodox-Syriac Church ====
In Yeşilköy on 3 August 2019, in the presence of the Patriarch of the Syriac Church, Patriarch Bartholomew and Mayor of Istanbul Ekrem İmamoğlu, President Erdoğan laid the foundation stone of the first Syriac church to be erected in Turkey since the founding of the republic. The area chosen for the construction is a part of the land of the ancient Levantine cemetery. The church was completed in 2023.

==== Aghiasma of Aghia Fotini ====
In the vicinity of the Greek church, there is also an aghiasma, i.e. a Greek Orthodox sacred spring, dating back to the Byzantine period and dedicated to Aghia Fotini, located in the basement of a house and freely accessible from the street, which is a covered pedestrian pathway hosting several restaurants.

=== Religious buildings gallery ===
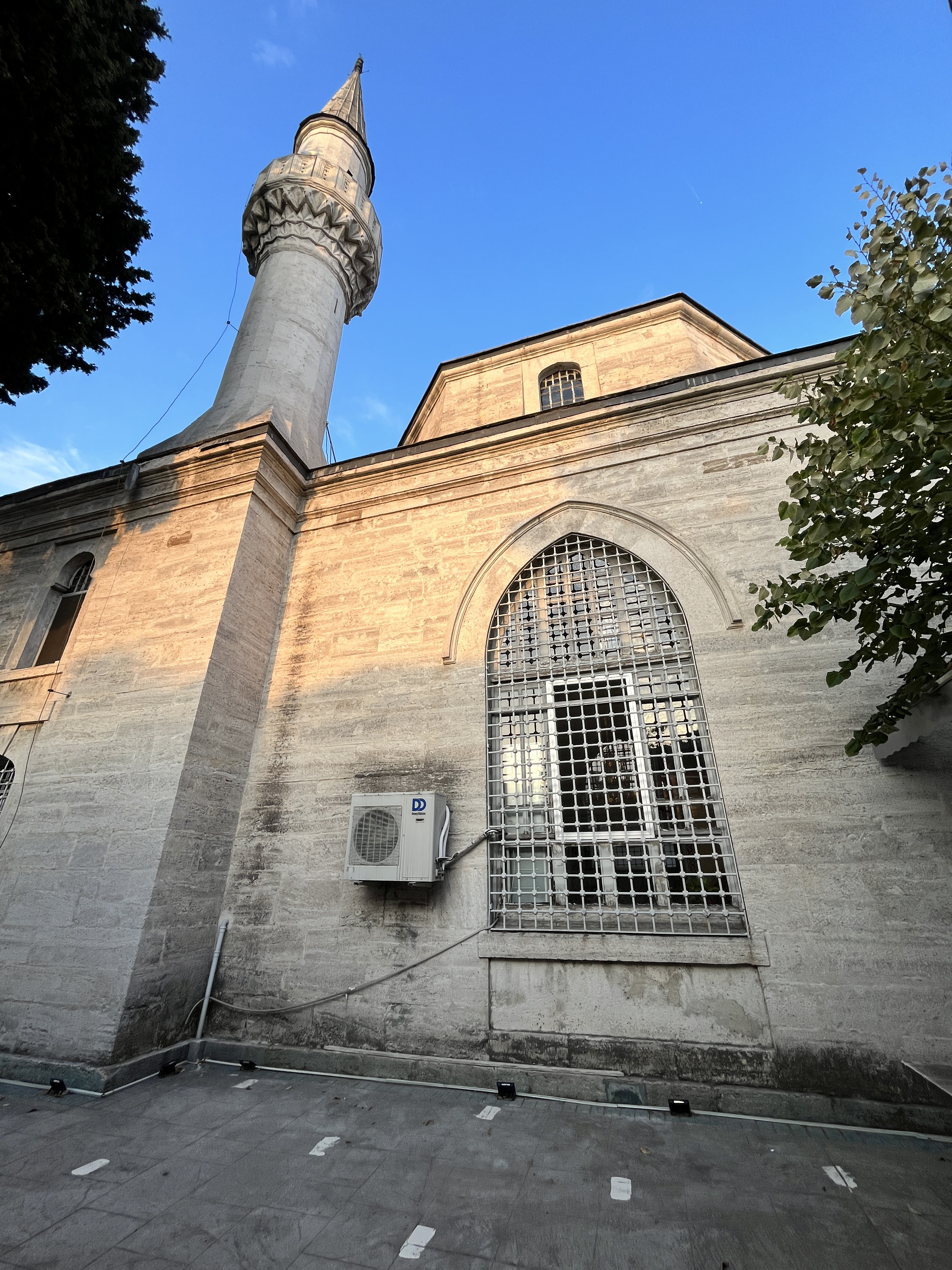
Mecidiye Mosque

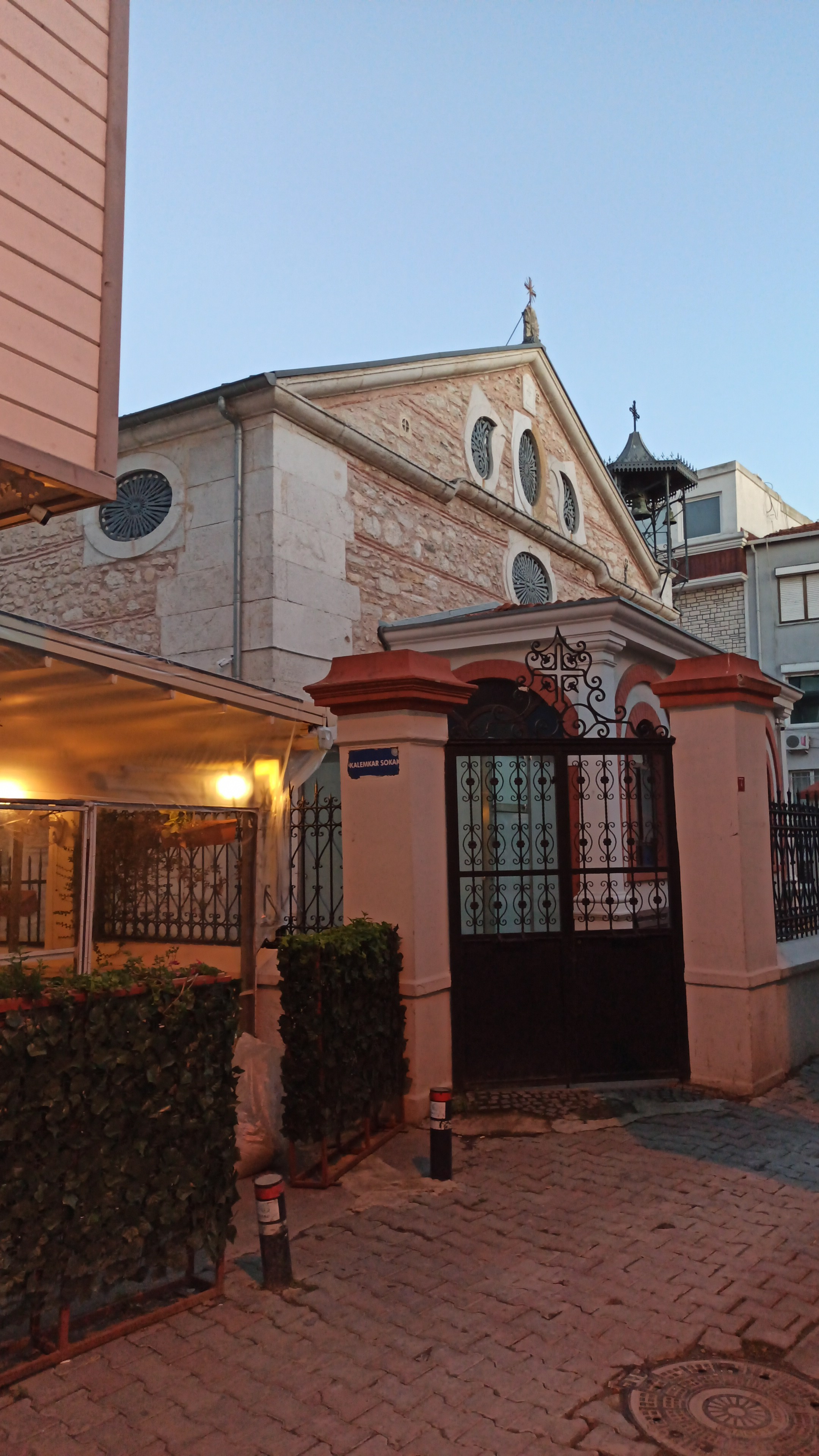
Agios Stephanos Greek Orthodox church

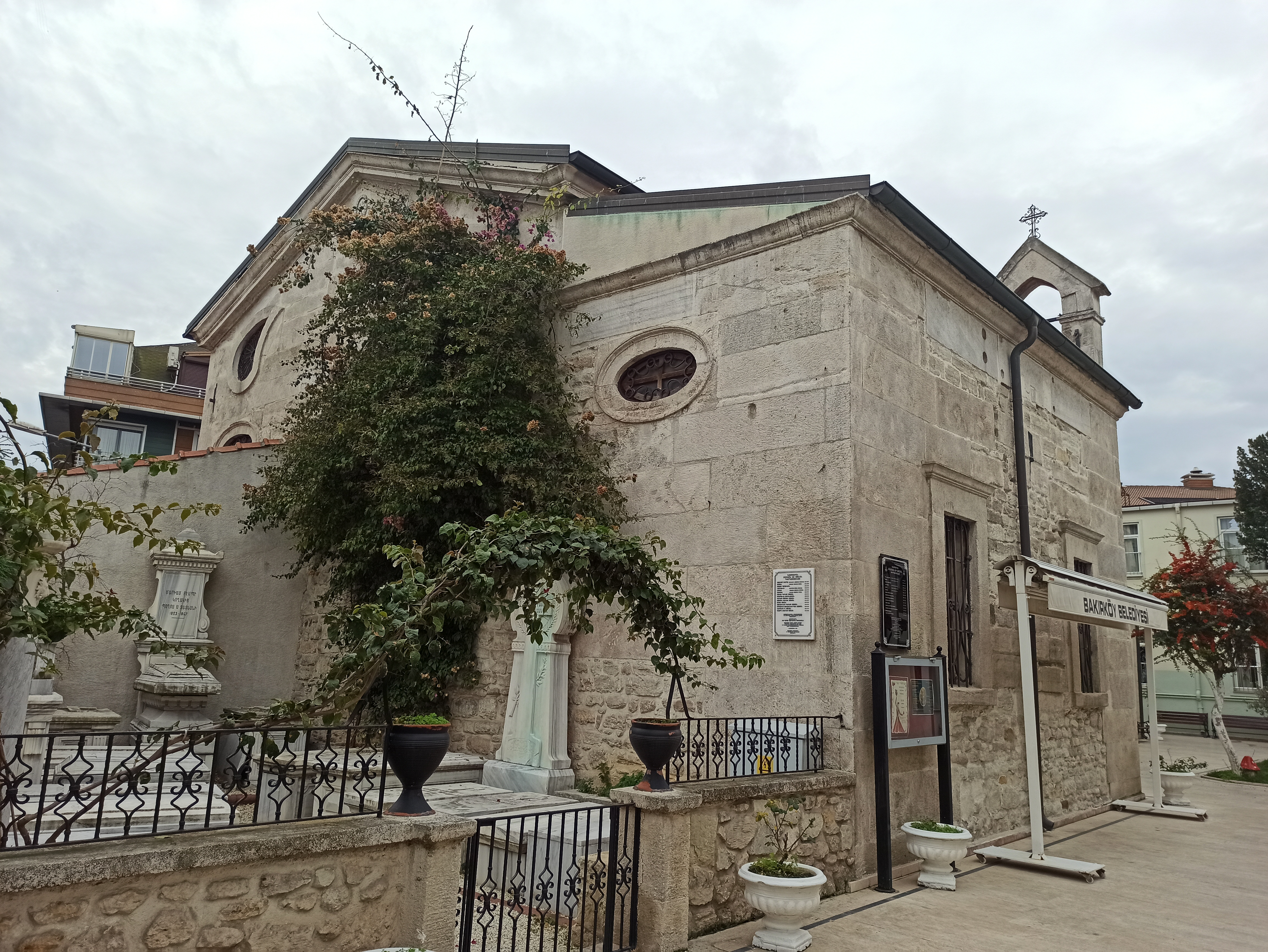
Surp Stepanos Armenian church

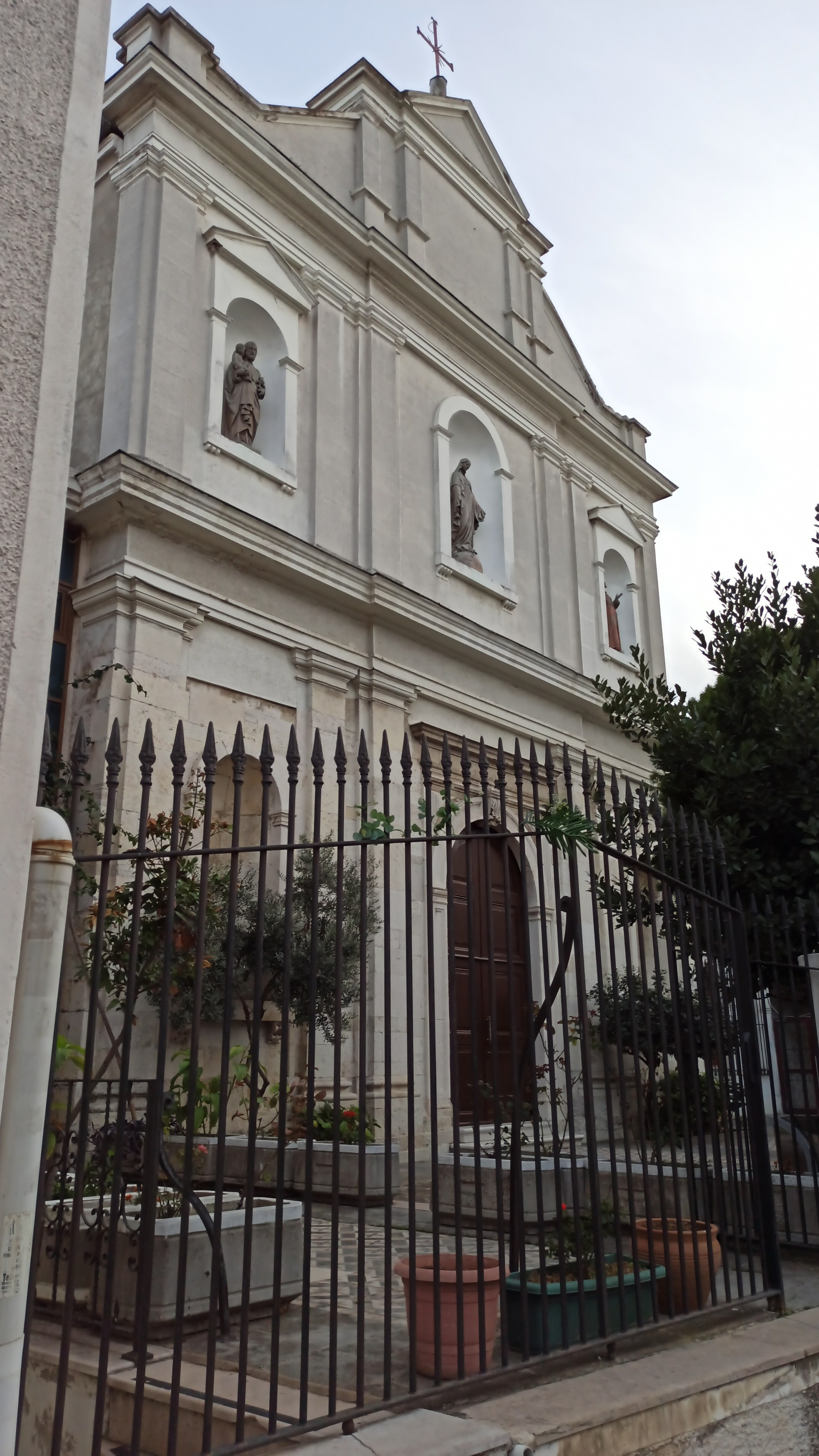
Santo Stefano Roman Catholic church

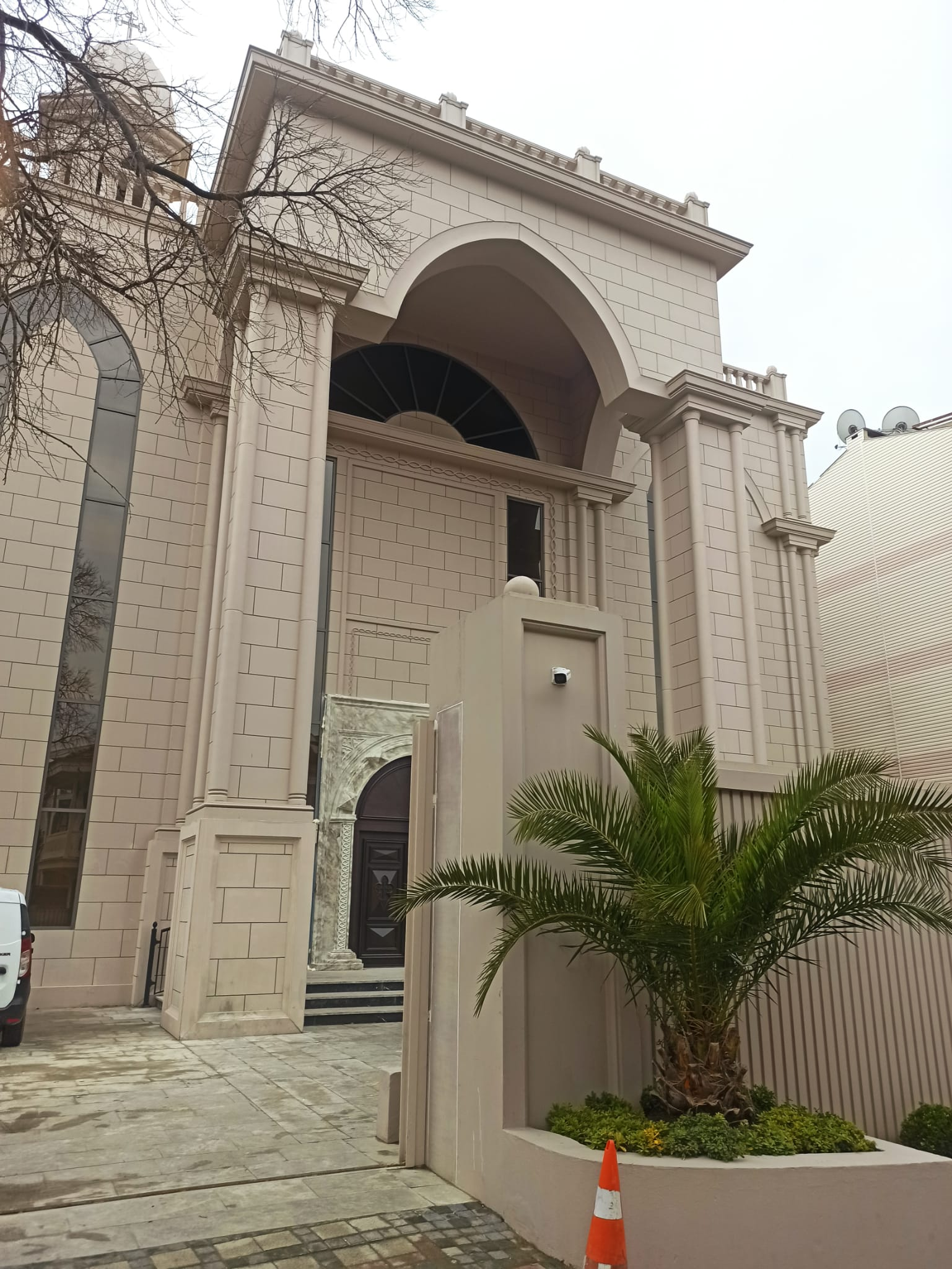
St. Efrem Syrian Orthodox church

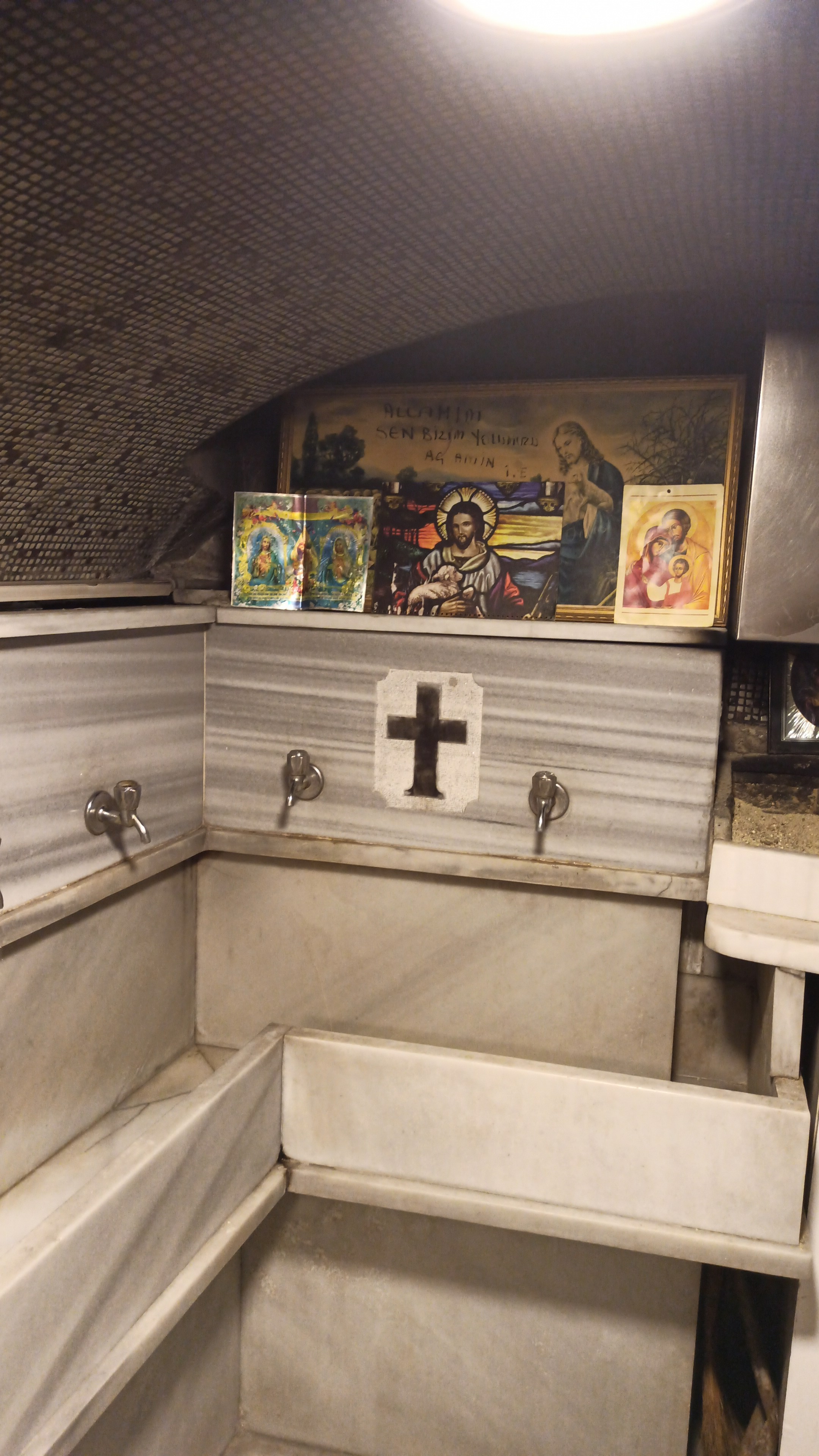
Aghiasma of Agia Photini

== Transportation ==
Yeşilköy has a station for the Marmaray commuter railway between Gebze and Halkalı. The first station, servicing the suburban railway line (Banliyö Treni) to Sirkeci, was built in 1871, and contributed to the neighbourhood's boom as a popular resort. The quarter is connected to the center of the city and to the nearby neighborhoods by bus. The Dolmuş lines which connected Yeşilköy with the center and Bakirköy have been discontinued after the entry into service of Marmaray.

Istanbul Atatürk International Airport, formerly known as the Yeşilköy Airport, is located in this district.

== Economy ==
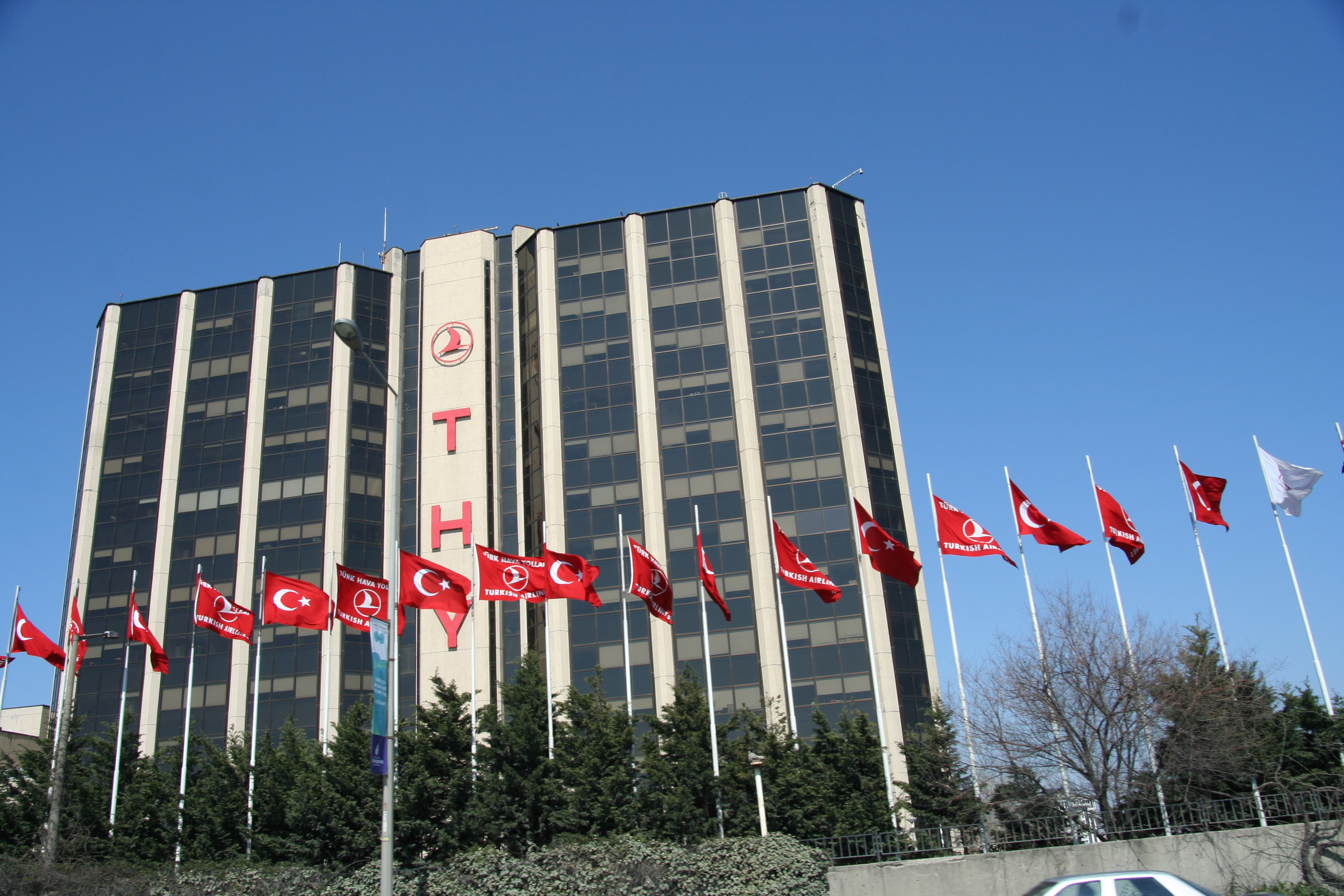
Turkish Airlines headquarters

The headquarters of Turkish Airlines are on the property of the airport. MyCargo Airlines (formerly ACT Airlines) has its head office in Level 4, Building A3 of the Istanbul World Trade Center (İstanbul Dünya Ticaret Merkezi) in Yeşilköy. Borajet also had its head office in Yeşilköy. When Bestair existed, its head office was in Yeşilköy.

Yeşilköy has a Marina - the Yeşilköy Burnu Marina - and sandy beaches.

== Culture ==
On the waterfront, a small museum dedicated to the village and its minorities was opened in 2012.

== Honour ==
San Stefano Peak on Rugged Island in the South Shetland Islands, Antarctica is named after the settlement, in connection with the Treaty of San Stefano.

== Images of Yeşilköy ==
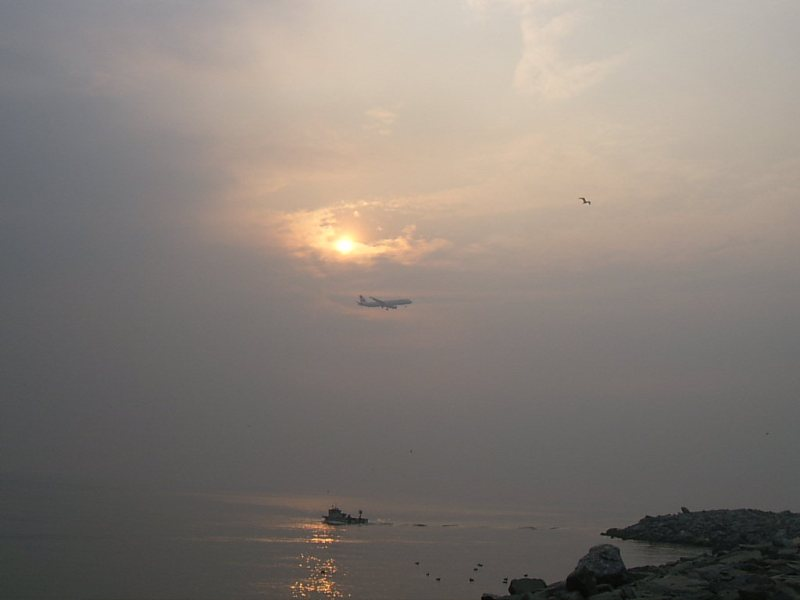
View of the Marmara Sea from Yeşilköy

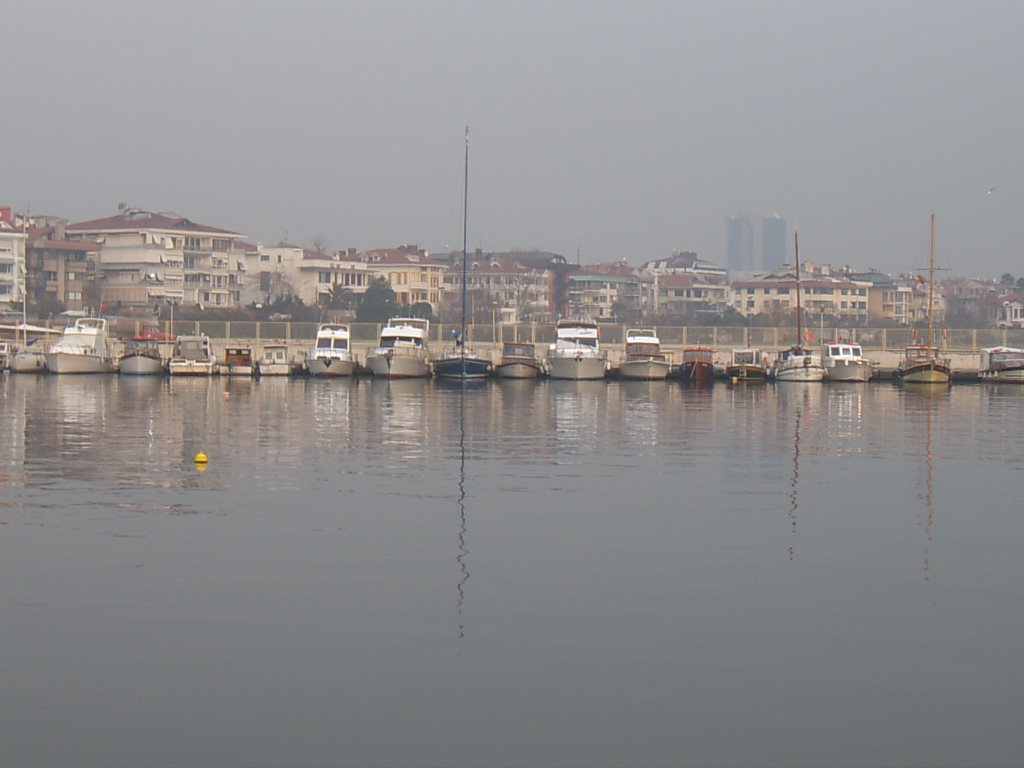
Yeşilköy Marina

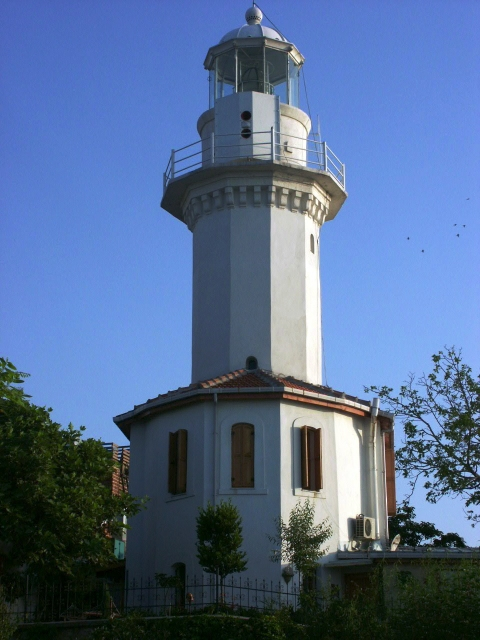
Yeşilköy Lighthouse (now in Yeşilyurt)

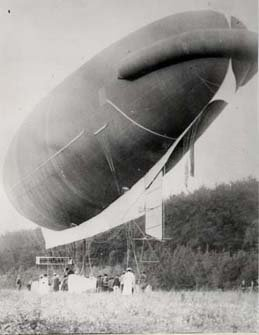
Yeşilköy Air Base in 1911

== Sources ==
- Tuna, Turgay (2004). Ayastefanos'tan Yeşilköy'e (in Turkish).
- Turgay Tuna; Aliye Gümüş; Nalan Güneş; Busra Göktaş (2013). Yeşilköy (in Turkish). Istanbul: Boyut. ISBN 978-975-23-1077-3.

Marmaray Yeşilköy
