= Ömer the Tourist in Star Trek =

- Theatrical Poster
- Directed by: Hulki Saner
- Written by: Ferdi Merter; George Clayton Johnson (uncredited)
- Produced by: Hulki Saner
- Starring: Sadri Alışık; Kayhan Yıldızoğlu; Cemil Şahbaz; Elif Pektaş; Ferdi Merter; Erol Amaç; Füsun Olgaç; Şule Tınaz; Oytun Şenal; Necip Koçak; Nermin Altınses
- Cinematography: Çetin Gürtop; Özdemir Öğüt
- Release date: 1973
- Running time: 70 minutes
- Country: Turkey
- Language: Turkish

Ömer the Tourist in Star Trek (Turkish: Turist Ömer Uzay Yolunda) (also known as Turkish Star Trek) is a 1973 Turkish cult comedy-drama science fiction film produced and directed by Hulki Saner. The film features Sadri Alışık as Ömer the Tourist, a rural vagrant "tourist" living in Istanbul who is beamed aboard the Starship Enterprise. It is the last film in the Ömer the Tourist franchise. As a Turksploitation film, the film is a low-budget Turkish adaptation of Star Trek and uses unauthorized footage from it.

It draws most of its plot and dialogue from the Star Trek episode "The Man Trap", involving a shapeshifting creature who kills for salt, with smaller amounts of content from other episodes. Ömer the Tourist finds himself on an alien planet and later the Enterprise (Turkish: Atılgan, "Enterprising") when the character Profesör Crater needs someone to blame for the killings.

The film is a product of Turkey's cultural climate at the time. Ömer the Tourist represents a stereotypical lower-class individual who nevertheless manages to confuse and outwit higher-class, educated individuals—in this case, the ship's crew. The film also includes many distinctly Turkish stylistic elements.

== Background and analysis ==
The film is the eighth and final in a series of films featuring Alışık as Ömer the Tourist. The plot and dialogue are almost verbatim from "The Man Trap", with borrowings from "What Are Little Girls Made Of?" and "I, Mudd" (a collection of androids), "Arena" (Kirk battles a Gorn-like creature), and "Amok Time" (Kirk and Spak are forced to fight each other), as well as the unauthorized use of special effects footage from the series, a defining feature of Turksploitation films. It also features meat-eating flowers borrowed from The Little Shop of Horrors. Although unofficial and part of another franchise, it is the first movie taking place in the Star Trek universe, filmed six years before the official motion picture.

While Star Trek was created in 1966, it was not shown in Turkey until 1973, when the state owned Turkish Radio and Television Corporation (TRT), which held a monopoly on Turkish television at the time, began broadcasting it. By the next year, it attained enough popularity that director Hulki Saner decided to set the final installment of the Turist Ömer series in the Star Trek universe.

Early 1970s Turkey was also one of the largest film producers in the world, yet there was still a high demand for American films. At the time, it was often prohibitively expensive to screen major imported films anywhere but in urban cinemas. For this reason, cheaper Turkish remakes were produced for screening elsewhere in the country.

=== Ömer the Tourist ===
Ömer the Tourist, played by Sadri Alışık, first appeared in Turist Ömer (1964) as a poor, rural character who had recently moved to Istanbul. He finds himself effectively a "tourist" in the city's urban environment. In later films Ömer is introduced to high society, travels to Germany as a migrant worker, and later travels to Arabia, Africa, and Spain. His travels allow him to comment on the strange peoples and customs he encounters. Moreover, his depiction as a rude, unkempt vagrant and bum satirises the class assumptions of tourism, which are based on affluent, capitalist, Western travelers.

=== Character and cultural analysis ===
Spak speaking directly to the camera

The movie makes frequent use of distinctly Turkish stylistic elements, such as the actors facing the camera instead of each other when speaking, the use of the ruins of Ephesus for the set of an alien planet, (Note: These two decisions were primarily budget-related or due to similarly restrictive conditions of production. Using front-facing shots instead of switching between different shots saved time and money. Additionally, Istanbul lacked large-scale studio facilities.) and Ömer the Tourist constantly using urban Istanbul slang and local reference points that cause friction with the crew of the Enterprise. This friction is particularly evident with Spak (Spock), whose sense of Vulcan rationality is challenged by Ömer's behaviour, prompting him to label Ömer an "illogical creature". By the end of the film, however, both characters have adopted some of each other's characteristics. For instance, Spock playfully uses the slang phrase "Zit!" while pulling his hand back from a handshake with Ömer. Meanwhile, Ömer gains pointed ears and similar Vulcan abilities.

Film scholars Iain Robert Smith and Savaş Arslan draw a parallel between the characters of Ömer the Tourist and Spak and those of Karagöz and Hacivat in the eponymous Turkish shadow play. While this framing could be seen as simply upholding Orientalist (and Occidentalist) stereotypes, Smith argues that Ömer/Karagöz connects with the audience by giving them a sense of power against higher-class individuals like Spak/Hacivat.

Arslan notes that the character of Ömer the Tourist exists across multiple textual worlds: textually, as the main character of the film; intertextually, as someone who carries his identity intact both over a series of films and into the world of Star Trek; and extratextually, where he represents the audience's perception of the TV series. As an example of the latter, Arslan cites Ömer's response to Spock: "The monster is dead, but you live. Everybody is afraid of you" after the monster has been killed, as a deliberate extratextual reference from the perspective of a Turkish audience who jokingly fear Spock's pointed ears.

Author Özlem Tuğçe Kaymaz highlights scenes that exemplify Turkey's patriarchal culture at that time. For example, in the first scene showing Ömer the Tourist, he is forced into a shotgun wedding. In another scene, he remarks that a female crew member is "not a space girl, [but] her mother's daughter.", (Note: Turkish: "O uzay kızı değil, anasının kızı." Note that Turkish uses the same word kız for both girl and daughter.) showing how he treats women as objects of desire. At the same time, Kaymaz argues, the film's male characters are also shown to be vulnerable to women and femininity, with the monster taking the form of several different women across the film. These traits exemplify the film's status as what she calls "local fiction", a potentially distinct subgenre which blends science fiction and satire.

Author and historian Jörg Matthias Determann says that while the movie can hardly be considered Islamic science fiction, he notes several scenes involving and making fun of religion, including the scene at the start of the film where Ömer prays to be rescued from his shotgun wedding and is transported to the planet.

=== Copyright ===
The film is also notable for its complete flouting of Star Trek's copyright, which Smith calls "one of the most significant contextual factors" surrounding it. At the time, Turkey did not conceptualize copyright and plagiarism the same way the Western world did, despite having signed the 1952 Berne Convention, which was rarely enforced. Eva Hemmungs Wirten argues that international copyright treaties serve the interests of those "who can be seen as exporters/producers of assets deemed intellectual property, and not the interests of the importers/consumers of the same assets". For 1970s Turkey, a net importer of such assets, the cultural climate in which Ömer the Tourist in Star Trek was created did not encourage the expansion of copyright to imported media.

== Plot ==
- (character names and spellings taken from the film's credits)

The Enterprise visits planet M-113, where Doktor McCoy's old girlfriend Nancy, and her husband Profesör Crater, harbor a secret. "Nancy" is really a shapeshifting creature who kills for salt. When Nancy kills several crewmen, Profesör Crater pulls Ömer, on the point of being forced into a shotgun wedding, from his time zone, reasoning that Kaptan Kirk and Mr. Spak will blame him for the murders of the crewmen. Ömer beams aboard the Enterprise (Atılgan, 'Enterprising'), creating havoc, especially irritating Mr. Spak. During the course of the movie, Kirk battles androids, a Gorn-like creature and even Mr. Spak, after Nancy assumes the shape of Ti-Pau, a Vulcan. The creature is killed by Kirk, Spak and McCoy. Ömer gains Vulcan abilities from Spak, which he uses to get himself out of his shotgun wedding.

== Cast ==
Per film billing order, and with spellings taken from the credits (certain descriptive names translated):

- Sadri Alışık as Ömer
- Erol Amaç as Mr. Spak
- Cemil Şahbaz as Kaptan Kirk
- Ferdi Merter as Doktor McCoy
- Kayhan Yıldızoğlu as Profesör Crater
- Elif Pektaş as Jenice
- Şule Tınaz as Nancy Crater
- Oytun Şenal as Green
- Füsun Olgaç as Uhura
- Nevhilal as Mary
- Necip Koçak as Darnell
- Nermin Altınses as Ti-Pau
- Yılmaz Şahin as Scoty
- Nuri Uğur as Sulu
- Yılmaz Suiller as Black man
- Neslihan Özgür as Crewmember
- Sönmez Yıkılmaz as Hercules
- Yadigar Kırmızıgül as Monster
- Kazım Oğuz as Joe

== See also ==
- 1973 in film
