= Alışık =

Alışık is a Turkish surname. Notable people with the surname include:

- Kerem Alışık (born 1960), Turkish actor and television presenter
- Sadri Alışık (1925–1995), Turkish actor
