= I Am the Guilty One =

1953 film by Semih Evin

- Directed by: Semih Evin
- Written by: Semih Evin
- Produced by: Semih Evin
- Cinematography: Coni Kurtesoglu
- Production company: Seneka Film
- Release date: 1953
- Country: Turkey
- Language: Turkish

I Am the Guilty One (Turkish: Suçlu benim) is a 1953 Turkish drama film directed by Semih Evin and starring Zeynep Sirmali, Sadri Alisik and Kemal Edige.

== Cast ==
- Zeynep Sirmali
- Sadri Alisik
- Kemal Edige
- Settar Körmükçü
- Hayri Esen
- Muazzez Arçay
- Feridun Çölgeçen
- Melih Kaya
- Çetin Yilmaz

== Bibliography ==
- Türker İnanoğlu. 5555 afişle Türk Sineması. Kabalcı, 2004.
