= Kerem Alışık =

Turkish actor and television presenter (born 1960)

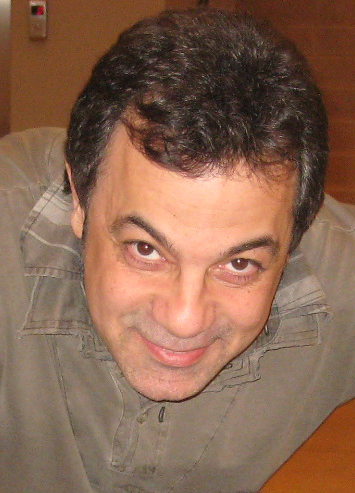
- Born: İsmail Kerem Alışık; 5 June 1960 (age 65); Istanbul, Turkey
- Occupations: Actor, television presenters
- Years active: 1988–present
- Spouse: Sibel Turnagöl (m. 1988; div. 1993)
- Children: 1
- Parents: Sadri Alışık (father); Çolpan İlhan (mother)
- Relatives: Attilâ İlhan (uncle)

İsmail Kerem Alışık (born 5 June 1960) is a Turkish actor and television presenter. He is the only son of famous actors of Turkish cinema Sadri Alışık and Çolpan İlhan. His uncle is famous writer Attilâ İlhan. Between 1988 and 1993, he was married to actress Sibel Turnagöl. He has appeared in many Turkish series and movies. He played his father's iconic role Turist Ömer in franchise film Arif V 216 again. Also, Mert Fırat portrayed his father Sadri Alışık in film Arif v 216. He is known for his directorship and production of Savaş Ay and the film The Belly Dancer (Dansöz). Most recently he portrayed as Fatin Rüştü Zorlu on the historical series Ben Onu Çok Sevdim.

== Filmography ==
TV series
Year	Title	Role	Network
1996–1997	Fırtınalar	Ferit Demiröz	Star TV
1997–1998	Oyun Bitti	Demir Filibe	Star TV
2000	Zehirli Çiçek	Orhan	Show TV
2000	Baykuşların Saltanatı		TRT1
2001	Böyle mi Olacaktı	Kadir Arıkan	ATV
2007	Kartallar Yüksek Uçar		FOX
2013–2014	Ben Onu Çok Sevdim	Fatin Rüştü Zorlu	ATV
2015	Kara Kutu	Başkomiser Tekin	Kanal D
2017–2018	Endless Love	Ayhan	Star TV
2018–2021	Bir Zamanlar Çukurova	Ali Rahmet Fekeli	ATV
2022–	Sipahi	Yıldırım Bozok	Show TV
TV programs
Year	Title	Notes	Network
2021–2022	Seneye Bu Zamanlar	presenter	TRT1
Film
Year	Title	Role	
1988	Ah Nalan Ah	Kemal	
2000	Dansöz	Zorro	
2004	Hoşgeldin Hayat	Serhat	
2004	Hababam Sınıfı Askerde	Sabit	
2008	Saddam'ın Askerleri: Kara Güneş		
2011	72. Koğuş	Berbat	
2015	Şartlı Tahliye	Raif	
2018	Arif V 216	Ömer	
2023	49	Ekrem Başkan	
