= Ege Aydan =

Turkish actor

- Born: 15 June 1958 (age 67); Ankara, Turkey
- Occupation: Actor
- Years active: 1974–present
- Height: 1.86 m (6 ft 1 in)
- Spouses: İpek Aydan (divorced) Sevilay Yılmaz (m. 2015)
- Children: 1
- Relatives: Efe Aydan (brother)

Ege Aydan (born 15 June 1958) is a Turkish actor. He has appeared in more than thirty films since 1974.

== Selected filmography ==
Film
Year	Title	Role	Notes
1996	Istanbul Beneath My Wings	Hezarfen Ahmet Çelebi	
2001	The Waterfall	Sami	
2008	Son Ders	Caner	
2014	Fakat Müzeyyen Bu Derin Bir Tutku	Burak	
2021	Anatolian Leopard (Anadolu Leoparı)	Nevzat	

TV
Year	Title	Role	Notes
1989	Kaynanalar	Timuçin Hakmen	
2010–2012	Behzat Ç. Bir Ankara Polisiyesi	Şevket	
