= Belly dancer (disambiguation) =

A belly dancer is one who performs belly dance.

The phrase may also refer to:

- "Belly Dancer" (Bananza), a single by R&B singer Akon
- "Belly Dancer" (Kardinal Offishall song), a hip hop song
- The Belly Dancer, a 2001 Turkish drama film
- "Belly Dancer", a song by Joe Satriani from the album Strange Beautiful Music
