= Turksploitation =

Turkish adaptations of Hollywood films

Turksploitation (a portmanteau of "Turkey" and "exploitation") is a tongue-in-cheek label given to a great number of Turkish low-budget exploitation films that are either remakes of, or use unauthorized footage from, popular foreign films (particularly Hollywood movies) and television series, produced mainly in the 1970s and 1980s.

Der Spiegel labeled these films the "most sympathetic and anarchical subgenre of exploitation film". Filmed on a shoestring budget with often comically simple special effects and no regard for copyright, Turksploitation films substituted exuberant inventiveness and zany plots for technical and acting skill, although noted Turkish actors did feature in some of these productions.

The original soundtracks of the original film or of other Hollywood films were often reused. On occasion whole segments of the original film, such as special effects shots, were copied into the adaptation.

== List of Turksploitation films ==
Noted examples of Turksploitation films include:

- 3 Dev Adam ("3 Giant Men"), 1973. Features heroes Captain America and El Santo (a Mexican wrestler), a villainous Spider-Man and reuses the soundtracks of James Bond movies.
- Altın Çocuk ("Golden Boy"), 1966. This Turkish version of the James Bond film series was followed by two sequels.
- Ayşecik ve Sihirli Cüceler Rüyalar Ülkesinde ("Little Ayşe and the Magic Dwarves in the Land of Dreams"), 1971. Based on The Wizard of Oz, it featured child star Zeynep Değirmencioğlu.
- Badi ("Buddy"), colloquially "Turkish E.T.". Based on E.T., the theatrical release poster also features the Starship Enterprise.
- Bedmen - Yarasa Adam, 1973. Based on the 1960s Batman U.S. TV series.
- Cellat ("Executioner"), based on Death Wish.
- Çöl ("Desert"), referred to as "Turkish Jaws" due to a scene two-thirds of the way into the film that resembles Jaws and even uses the theme from the film, but has nothing to do with Jaws.
- Dünyayı Kurtaran Adam ("The Man Who Saved The World"), colloquially "Turkish Star Wars", 1982. A science fantasy martial arts superhero film, combining elements from Hollywood science fiction and Hong Kong action films. Includes footage from Star Wars and reuses the soundtracks of Star Wars, Battlestar Galactica, Planet of the Apes, Moonraker and Flash Gordon, as well as the theme music of Indiana Jones.
- Drakula İstanbul'da, an adaptation of Bram Stoker's Dracula set in Istanbul.
- Homoti, colloquially "Turkish E.T. 2", or "The Other Turkish E.T.". It is unrelated to Badi.
- Kara Şimşek ("Black Lightning"), based on Rocky.
- Karateci Kız ("Karate Girl"), 1973. A martial arts action film.
- Kelepçe, 1982. Based on Dirty Harry and featuring Cüneyt Arkın.
- Korkusuz ("Rampage"), colloquially "Turkish Rambo", 1986. Based on Rambo: First Blood Part II and one of the few Turksploitation productions available on DVD.
- Ölüm Savaşçısı ("Death Warrior"), a 1984 film belonging to the ninja exploitation genre.
- Ramo, based on Rambo.
- Şeytan ("Satan"), 1974. A scene-by-scene remake of The Exorcist, even reusing the original soundtrack.
- Sokakların Kanunu, based on Death Wish 2.
- Süpermen Dönüyor ("Superman Returns"), based on Superman.
- Turist Ömer Uzay Yolunda ("Ömer the Tourist in Star Trek"), 1973. Based on an episode of the TV series, this first film adaptation of Star Trek preceded the official Star Trek: The Motion Picture by six years.
- Vahşi Kan ("Wild Blood"), based on First Blood.

== See also ==
- Blaxploitation
- Bruceploitation
