= Istanbul Beneath My Wings =

Istanbul Beneath My Wings (İstanbul Kanatlarımın Altında)
- Directed by: Mustafa Altıoklar
- Written by: Mustafa Altıoklar
- Produced by: Üstün Karabol; Nida Karabol Akdeniz
- Starring: Ege Aydan; Okan Bayülgen; Beatriz Rico; Haluk Bilginer; Savaş Ay; Burak Sergen; Zuhal Olcay
- Cinematography: Uğur İçbak
- Music by: Tuluyhan Uğurlu
- Release date: 15 March 1996
- Running time: 120 minutes
- Country: Turkey
- Language: Turkish

Istanbul Beneath My Wings (Original Turkish title: İstanbul Kanatlarımın Altında) is a 1996 Turkish film, written and directed by Mustafa Altıoklar. It is a dramatization of Hezârfen Ahmet Çelebi's reported flight across the Bosphorus from Galata.

== Plot ==
The film takes place in the 17th century. Hezârfen Ahmet Çelebi and Lagâri Hasan Çelebi are researching bird flight. The new Sultan Murat IV resists the domination of his mother, the Valide Kösem Sultan and tries to enforce strict law and order in the empire. Meanwhile, a Venetian ship that has been captured by Algerian pirates is brought into Istanbul. One of those on the ship is a girl with a manuscript showing how to fly, the latter of which comes into Hezârfen's possession. However, this manuscript can't be deciphered by anyone.

Hezârfen and Hasan are caught examining a dead body (which is against the law) and sent to be executed. At the intervention of the Sultan, they are sent for a court trial. Hasan tries to justify the research and experiments by claiming that they could be used as a weapon to defeat the enemies of the Ottomans. Murat forbids experiments on dead human bodies but gives his blessing to the duo's research on flying, hoping for a new army of flying soldiers that could get past ground level barriers like walls and the sea, and drop bombs. To go about their task, Hezârfen and Hasan tell Murat of the undecipherable script and ask him to release the girl from the dungeon.

The script belongs to Leonardo da Vinci and they realise that he too had the same idea of flying with wings, but the text is coded so they are unable to read it. Hezârfen and the girl (whose name turns out to be Francesca/Françeska) fall in love. After witnessing some fireworks, Hasan tries experimenting with rockets and during a grand launch, manages to reach a reasonable altitude before bailing out and landing in the water below. When some drinks are accidentally spilt on the manuscript, the coded text becomes visible and Hezârfen uses his own ideas and that of Da Vinci's to build a flying machine consisting of artificial wings. The conservative Şeyh-ül İslam who is against Hezârfen tries to turn the Sultan against him. He succeeds when the Sultan bans Hezârfen from flying and orders his arrest. Hezârfen (with Françeska) manages to escape with the help of Evliya Çelebi to the Galata Tower and launches his flying machine across the Bosporus.

== Cast ==
- Ege Aydan as Hezârfen Ahmet Çelebi
- Okan Bayülgen as Lagari Hasan Çelebi
- Beatriz Rico as Françeska
- Burak Sergen as Sultan Murat IV
- Savaş Ay as Bekri Mustafa
- Zuhal Olcay as Kösem Sultan
- Haluk Bilginer as Evliya Çelebi
- Tuncel Kurtiz as Topal Recep Paşa
- Giovanni Scognamillo as Antonio Ağa
- Ayton Sert as Hekimbaşı
- Berke Hürcan as Musa Çelebi
- Nazan Kesal as Fahişe
- Altan Günbay as Meyhaneci Agop
- Akasya Asıltürkmen as Leyla Hazer
- Cüneyt Çalışkur as Şeyh-ül İslam

== Awards ==
Burak Sergen was awarded "Most Promising New Actor" at the 8th Ankara Film Festival. The film also won awards for "Best Music" (Tuluyhan Uğurlu) and "Best Cinematography" (Uğur İçbak) at the 18th SİYAD awards.

== Bibliography ==
- Türker İnanoğlu, 5555 Afişle Türk Sineması. İstanbul: Kabalcı, 2004.
- Agâh Özgüç, Ansiklopedik Türk Filmleri Sözlüğü. İstanbul: Horizon International Yayınları, 2012.
- Agâh Özgüç, Türk Filmleri Sözlüğü 1917–2009. İstanbul: T. C. Kültür ve Turizm Bakanlığı ve SESAM, 2009.
- Deniz Yavuz, Türkiye Sinemasının 22 Yılı (1990-2011). İstanbul: Antrakt Sinema Kitaplığı, 2013.
