= Attilâ İlhan =

Turkish poet, novelist, essayist, journalist and reviewer (1925–2005)

- Born: Attilâ Hamdi İlhan; 15 June 1925; Menemen, Turkey
- Died: 10 October 2005 (aged 80); Istanbul, Turkey
- Occupation: Author
- Relatives: Çolpan İlhan (sister); Kerem Alışık (nephew)
- Writing career
- Period: 1957–2005
- Website: www.tilahan.org

Attilâ İlhan (15 June 1925 – 10 October 2005) was a Turkish poet, novelist, essayist, journalist and reviewer.

== Early life and education ==
Attilâ İlhan was born in Menemen in İzmir Province, Turkey on 15 June 1925. He received most of his primary education in İzmir. However, because of his father's job, he completed his junior high school education in different cities. Aged 16 and enrolled in İzmir Atatürk High School, he got into trouble for sending a poem by Nazım Hikmet, a famous dissident communist Turkish poet, to a girl he was in love with. He was arrested and taken into custody for three weeks. He was also dismissed from school and jailed for two months. After his imprisonment, İlhan was forbidden from attending any schools in Turkey, thus interrupting his education.

Following a favourable court decision in 1941, he received permission to continue his education again and enrolled in Istanbul Işık High School. During the last year of his high school education, his uncle sent one of his poems to CHP Poetry Competition without telling Attilâ. The poem, Cebbaroğlu Mehemmed, won the second prize among many poems written by famous poets. He graduated from high school in 1942 and enrolled in Istanbul University's law school. However, he left midway through his legal education to pursue his own endeavours and published his first poetry book, Duvar (The Wall).

== Years in Paris ==
In his second year at Istanbul University, he went to Paris in order to take part in supporting Nazım Hikmet. His observations of the French and their culture were to influence many of his works.

After returning to Turkey, he repeatedly ran into trouble with the police. Interrogations in Sansaryan Han influenced his works based on death, thriller, etc. Although this atmosphere of tension was not in his first poems, the poet published poems in which he remembered or criticized his old days, especially in his books such as Bela Çiçeği. He was detained several times.

Attilâ İlhan stated that the nickname "Captain" was given to him by his friends after he grew a beard for a while during his years in Paris. The poem "The Captain", consisting of five parts, was effective in the treatment of the nickname.

== Return to Istanbul ==
In 1973, he took on the investment of Bilgi Publishing House and moved to Ankara. He wrote Hyena Share and Rubbing Salt in the Wound in Ankara. The writer, who stayed in Ankara until 1981, settled in Istanbul after publishing his novel Fena Halde Leman (Terribly Leman). His journalism adventure in Istanbul came to the fore with Milliyet (2 March 1982 - 15 November 1987) and Gelişim Publications. Attilâ İlhan, who wrote for Güneş newspaper for a while, continued to write for Meydan newspaper between 1993 and 1996. He continued his columns in Cumhuriyet newspaper from 1996 to 2005. With the start of television broadcasts in Turkey in the 1970s and their distribution to large audiences, Attilâ İlhan also returned to writing scripts.

Headlines on Eight Columns, Eagles Fly High and Tomorrow is Today were the TV series that were watched with admiration by the public.

By the time his first novel, The Man on the Street, was published, he had written 10 novels. These do not cause light on any day. Attilâ İlhan explains the reason for this in an interview: "... there are many other novels. But why were they not published? There was a very detailed reason. Because we know that the writers' first novels describe their experiences. That is not novelism either. They keep a diary." (Think, June 1996).

While other writers of the period who started their novel adventure mostly dealt with local and travel events and people, Attilâ İlhan worked in a structure that dealt with the city people and the recent economic and social aspects of Turkey. He not only reflected the big cities of Turkey such as Istanbul and Izmir, the lifestyle of his period, and the appearance of their economic and social heroes, but also examined how Western culture reflected on Turkey, its positive and negative situations, within a structure that overlapped with the characters he drew and the cities in Europe. .

== Istanbul–Paris–Izmir triangle ==
He returned to Paris again in 1951 because of an official investigation about an article in Gerçek newspaper. In this period he learned to speak French and studied Marxist philosophy. In the 1950s Attilâ İlhan spent his days along an Istanbul–Paris–İzmir triangle and during this period he became popular in Turkey. After returning to Turkey, he resumed studying law. However, in his last year at law school, he left university and took up a journalistic career. His relationship with the cinema also started in this year. He began writing movie reviews and critiques in Vatan newspaper.

== Artistic versatility ==
After completing his military service in Erzurum in 1957, İlhan returned to Istanbul and concentrated on cinema. He wrote screenplays for nearly 15 movies under the pen name Ali Kaptanoğlu. However, cinema didn't meet his expectations and he returned to Paris in 1960. During this period, he analyzed the development of socialism and television. The unexpected death of his father caused him to return to his hometown of İzmir, where he would remain for the next eight years. During this period, he served as the editorial writer and editor-in-chief of the Democratic İzmir newspaper. During the same years, he also wrote poetry books, Yasak Sevişmek and Bıçağın Ucu of the Aynanın İçindekiler series.

== Political views ==
Attilâ İlhan was a Kemalist and socialist. In his later life, he appeared on television programs where he discussed literary and social issues. Although he was a devoted communist, he never espoused Stalinism and he always took a nationalistic point of view within communism. He was also an intellectual figure in Turkey where his ideas influenced the public. In his series of books entitled Hangi …, he questioned the imitative intellectualism which dominated the cultural and political life of Turkey.

== Personal life ==
He married in 1968 and remained so for 15 years. He was the brother of famous Turkish actress Çolpan İlhan, wife of the late Sadri Alışık, himself a famous actor.

== Death ==
Attilâ İlhan had his first heart attack in 1985. İlhan's cardiological problems continued after this date, and his health condition deteriorated further from 2004 onwards. He was 80 years old when he died of his second heart attack at his home in Istanbul on October 10, 2005[1].

He was deemed worthy of the 2003 Sertel Democracy Award. He won the 1946 CHP Poetry Competition Second Place, the 1974 Turkish Language Association Poetry Award with the Detainee's Diary and the 1974 Yunus Nadi Novel Gift with Hyena Payı. The Attilâ İlhan Science, Art and Culture Foundation, which was established in 2007 after his death, continues its work.

== List of works ==
=== Poems ===
- Duvar (The Wall)
- Sisler Bulvarı (Boulevard of Mists)
- Yağmur Kaçağı (Escapee from Rain)
- Ben Sana Mecburum (Compelled to You)
- Bela Çiçeği (Trouble Flower)
- Yasak Sevişmek ( Forbidden Love)
- Tutuklunun Günlüğü (A Prisoner's Diary)
- Böyle Bir Sevmek (Loving Like This)
- Elde Var Hüzün (Grief Remains)
- Korkunun Krallığı (Kingdom of Fear)
- Ayrılık Sevdaya Dahil (Parting is in Love)
- Allende Allende
- Pia

=== Novels ===
- Sokaktaki Adam (The Man on the Street)
- Zenciler Birbirine Benzemez (Black Men Don't Look Alike)
- Kurtlar Sofrası (Feast of Wolves)
- Bıçağın Ucu (Tip of the Knife)
- Sırtlan Payı (Hyena's Share)
- Yaraya Tuz Basmak (Salting the Wound)
- Dersaadet'te Sabah Ezanları (Morning Adhans in the Abode of Felicity (Istanbul))
- O Karanlıkta Biz (Us in That Darkness)
- Fena Halde Leman (Desperately Leman)
- Haco Hanım Vay (Haco Hanım Wow)
- Allah'ın Süngüleri "Reis Paşa" (Bayonets of God "Reis Pasha")

=== Essays ===
- Abbas Yolcu
- Yanlış Kadınlar Yanlış Erkekler (Wrong Women Wrong Men)
- Hangi Sol (Which Left)
- Hangi Sağ (Which Right)
- Hangi Batı (Which West)
- Hangi Seks (Which Sex)
- Hangi Atatürk (Which Atatürk)
- Hangi Edebiyat (Which Literature)
- Hangi Laiklik (Which Laisism)
- Hangi Küreselleşme (Which Globalization)
- Gerçekçilik Savaşı (War of Reality)
- İkinci Yeni Savaşı (War of the Second New)
- Faşizmin Ayak Sesleri (Footsteps of Fascism)
- Batının Deli Gömleği (The Straitjacket of the West)
- Sağım Solum Sobe (My Right my Left, Sobe!)
- Ulusal Kültür Savaşı (National Culture War)
- Sosyalizm Asıl Şimdi (Socialism Now)
- Aydınlar Savaşı (War of Intellectuals)
- Kadınlar Savaşı (War of Women)
- Bir Sap Kırmızı Karanfil (A Red Carnation Stalk)
- Ufkun Arkasını Görebilmek (To See Beyond the Horizon)

=== Short stories ===
- Yengecin Kıskacı (Crab's Pincer)

=== Translations ===
- "Kanton'da İsyan" (The Conquerors by André Malraux)
- "Umut" (Man's Hope by André Malraux)
- "Basel'in Çanları" (The Bells of Basel by Louis Aragon)
