= Akasya Asıltürkmen =

Turkish actress

- Born: 14 April 1977 (age 48); Istanbul
- Occupations: Acting coach, actress, teacher of voice and diction
- Years active: 1996–present
- Spouse: Serdar Özerman (m. 2016; div. 2019)
- Children: 1

Akasya Asıltürkmen (born 14 April 1977) is a Turkish acting coach, film, stage, television and voice actress. She studied Theatre at Mimar Sinan Fine Arts University in Istanbul. Asıltürkmen is of mixed Circassian, Georgian, Laz and Turkish origin.

== Filmography ==
=== Film ===
Year	Title	Role	Notes
1996	İstanbul Kanatlarımın Altında	Hezarfen Ahmet's sister	
1999	Renkli - Türkçe		
2000	Dedelerimi Evlendirirken		Television film
2000	Çilekli Pasta		Television film
2000	Offside		
2005	Pamuk Prenses 2	Füsun	
2006	Keloğlan Kara Prens'e Karşı	Taşkız	
2006	Araf	Eda	
2009	İpsiz Recep	Marika	
2009	Balıkçının Ölümü	Young girl	Short film
2010	Bana Bunlarla Gel		
2015	Enkaz	Nisa	Post-production

=== Television ===
Year	Title	Role	Notes
2001	Nasıl Evde Kaldım	Feza	Mini-series
2002	Vaka-i Zaptiye	Lebibe	
2003	Lise Defteri	Ayça	
2004	Dayı	Müge	
2004	Çınaraltı	Esin	
2005	Saklambaç	Bağdegül	
2006	Felek Ne Demek	Zekiye	
2011	Başrolde Aşk	Eda	

=== Stage ===
Year	Title	Role	Notes
2002	Twelfth Night		Semaver Kumpanya
2004	Süleyman ve Öbürsüler		Semaver Kumpanya
2009	Fesleğen Çıkmazı		Istanbul State Theatre
2009	Meteor		Tekin Akmansoy Tiyatrosu
2010	A Midsummer Night's Dream		Tiyatro Kedi
2011	Star-Spangled Gir		Tiyatro Şenay
2013	Kırmızı Yorgunları	Betty-Jessica	
2015	Romeo'yu Beklerken		
2015	İnternette Tanışan Son Çift		
