= Kaynanalar =

- Created by: Tekin Akmansoy; Arzu Akmansoy
- Starring: Tekin Akmansoy; Leman Çıdamlı; Defne Yalnız; Sevda Aydan; Ege Aydan; Münir Caner; Sermin Hürmeriç; Sezai Aydın
- No. of seasons: 14
- No. of episodes: 314

Original release
- Network: TRT 1 (1974-1988), (2000-2002), (2005); Kanal D (1997-1999)
- Release: May 19, 1974 – January 24, 2005

Kaynanalar, which started in 1974, is the first and longest-running Turkish sit-com (and also first and longest-running Turkish TV series), lasting 30 years.

== Cast ==
- Tekin Akmansoy - Nuri Kantar
- Leman Çıdamlı - Nuriye Kantar
- Defne Yalnız - Döndü
- Sevda Aydan - Tijen Hakmen
- Ege Aydan - Timuçin Hakmen
- Münir Caner - Katip Kerim
- Sermin Hürmeriç - Nur Hakmen
- Haşim Hekimoğlu - Timur Hakmen
- Gültekin Gülkan - Şerafettin
