= Ömer the Tourist (film) =

- Directed by: Hulki Saner
- Starring: Sadri Alışık; Vahi Öz
- Release date: 1964
- Running time: 1h 30min
- Country: Turkey
- Language: Turkish

Ömer the Tourist (Turkish: Turist Ömer) is a 1964 Turkish comedy film directed by Hulki Saner.

== Plot ==
Turist Ömer, a poor man, gets a job handing out fake money for an advertisement. By mistake, he takes a bag of real money from thieves. He spends it helping his friends while the thieves chase him.

== Cast ==
- Sadri Alışık - Turist Ömer
- Vahi Öz - Ruknettin Yakar
- Mualla Sürer - Bedia Yanar
- Çolpan İlhan
- Kartal Tibet
- Tuncel Kurtiz
