= Lagâri Hasan Çelebi =

Ottoman aviator

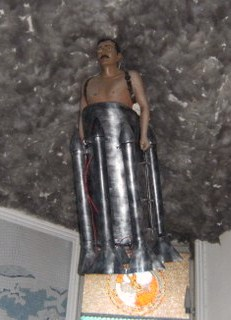
- A modern artistic depiction of Lagâri Hasan Çelebi
- Occupation: Engineer
- Known for: First ever crewed rocket flight
- Relatives: Hezârfen Ahmed Çelebi (brother)

Lagâri Hasan Çelebi was an Ottoman scientist, engineer and aviator who, according to the account written by traveller Evliya Çelebi, made a successful crewed rocket flight.

== Account ==
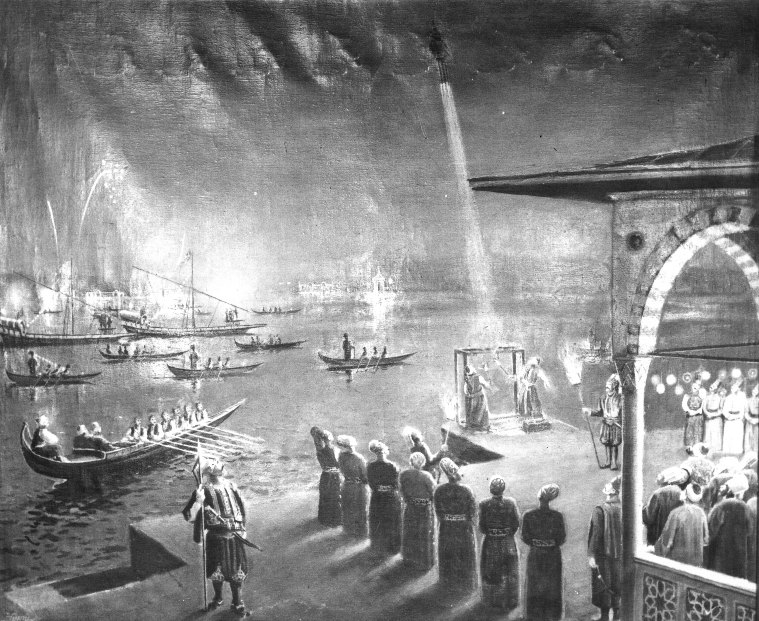
A modern artistic depiction of Lagâri Hasan Çelebi's legendary rocket flight

Evliya Çelebi reported that in 1633, Lagari Hasan Çelebi blasted off from Sarayburnu, (the promontory below the Topkapı Palace in Istanbul) in a 7-winged rocket propelled by 50 okka (64 kilograms or 141 pounds) of gunpowder. The flight was said to have been undertaken at the time of the birth of Sultan Murad IV's daughter. As Evliya Celebi wrote, Lagari proclaimed before launching his craft "O my sultan! Be blessed; I am going to talk to Jesus!"; after ascending in the rocket, he landed in the sea, swimming ashore and joking "O my sultan! Jesus sends his regards to you!"; he was rewarded by the Sultan with silver and the rank of sipahi in the Ottoman army.

Evliya Çelebi also mentioned another aviation pioneer, Hezârfen Ahmed Çelebi, making a flight by glider a year earlier.

== Popular culture ==
Istanbul Beneath My Wings is a 1996 film about the lives of Lagari Hasan Çelebi, his brother and fellow aviator Hezârfen Ahmed Çelebi, and Ottoman society in the early 17th century as witnessed and narrated by Evliya Çelebi.

The legend was addressed in an experiment by the television show MythBusters, on November 11, 2009, in the episode "Crash and Burn"; however, the team noted that Evliya Çelebi had not sufficiently specified the alleged design used by Lagâri Hasan and said that it would have been "extremely difficult" for a 17th-century figure, unequipped with modern steel alloys and welding, to land safely or even achieve thrust at all. Although the re-imagined rocket rose, it exploded midflight. However, a 4-winged rocket was used in MythBusters while Celebi was purported to have used a 7-winged rocket.

== See also ==
- Hezârfen Ahmed Çelebi
- Wan Hu
