= Çolpan İlhan =

Turkish actress (1936–2014)

- Born: 8 August 1936; İzmir, Turkey
- Died: 25 July 2014 (aged 77); Istanbul, Turkey
- Resting place: Zincirlikuyu Cemetery; 41°4′30″N 29°0′30″E
- Education: Kandilli High School for Girls; State Academy for Fine Arts
- Occupation: Actress
- Years active: 1957–2007
- Spouse: Sadri Alışık (m. 1959; died 1995)
- Children: Kerem Alışık
- Relatives: Attilâ İlhan (brother)
- Awards: Golden Orange Lifetime Achievement Award (2003)

Çolpan İlhan (8 August 1936 – 25 July 2014) was a Turkish cinema and theatre actress. In 1998 she was awarded the title of State Artist of Turkey. She acted in more than 300 films and theater plays.

== First years ==
İlhan received her secondary education at Istanbul Kandilli High School for Girls. Later she studied theater at İstanbul Municipal Drama School and painting at State Academy of Istanbul for Fine Arts. With her fellow students from the Academy, she later formed an amateur theater group called "Akademi Tiyatrosu (Academy Theater)" and prepared plays and dramas.

== Artistic career ==
In 1957, she acted in her first film called Kamelyalı Kadın, which was an adaptation to the movies of The Lady of the Camellias. The same year, she acted in her first professional play Sevgili Gölge (Dear Shadow) with Münir Özkul and Uğur Başaran at Küçük Sahne (Little Scene) Theater. She acted for 3 years in this theater until its disbandment in the same year. She later performed "Tersine Dönen Şemsiye (Inside-out Umbrella)" with Müfit Ofluoğlu and Sabahattin Kudret Aksal at Oda (Chamber) Theater. Later, she acted with Kent Oyuncuları (City Performers) in the play of Güner Sümer called "Yarın Cumartesi (Tomorrow is Saturday)". She also acted at Kenterler Theater in plays such as "Baharın Sesi (The Sound of Spring)", "Nalınlar (The Pattens)" and "Aptal Kız (The Foolish Girl)". After a while, she made a break in theater with the birth of her only child. Starting from the mid-1960s, she has returned to her acting career with movies and took part in around 300 Turkish films. She played in the movies until the end of 1970s all in the leading roles and then left the cinema industry and concentrated on fashion designing.

== State Artist of Turkey ==
In 1998, she was given the title of "State Artist of Turkey" by the Turkish Ministry of Culture.

== Personal life ==
She was the sister of famous poet and writer Attila İlhan, and the wife of Sadri Alışık, one of the most famous actors of the cinema of Turkey, with whom she stayed married from 1959 until his death in 1995. They had one child, Kerem Alışık, who is also an actor.

She died of a heart attack on 25 July 2014 at her home in Istanbul. She rests besides her husband at the Zincirlikuyu Cemetery, in Istanbul.

== Legacy ==
İlhan was the founder of the Sadri Alışık Cultural Center.

== Selected filmography ==
- Kamelyalı Kadın (1957)
- Ak Altın (1957) - Halime
- Yaşamak Hakkımdır (1958)
- Bir Şoförün Gizli Defteri (1958)
- Asi Evlat (1958)
- Hayatım Sana Feda (1959)
- Zümrüt (1959) - Feride
- Yalnızlar Rıhtımı (1959) - Kontes Güner
- Şeytan Mayası (1959)
- Kalpaklılar (1959) - Mujgan
- Cumbadan Rumbaya (1961)
- Aşkın Saati Gelince (1961)
- There Is Still Room in Hell (1961)
- Allah Cezanı Versin Osman Bey (1961)
- Sepetçioğlu (1961)
- Avare Mustafa (1961) - Hülya
- Sonbahar Yaprakları (1962)
- İkimize Bir Dünya (1962)
- Ver Elini İstanbul (1962)
- Sehirdeki yabanci (1962) - (voice, uncredited)
- Zorla Evlendik (1963) - Nilüfer Sim
- Temem Bilakis (1963)
- Korkusuz Kabadayı (1963) - Alev
- Kamil Abi (1963) - Gülizar
- Bütün Suçumuz Sevmek (1963)
- Barut Fıçısı (1963)
- Ömer the Tourist (1964)
- Şu Kızların Elinden (1964)
- Ahtapotun Kolları (1964)
- Şaka ile Karışık (1965) - Zühre
- Ekmekçi Kadın (1965)
- Seven Kadın Unutmaz (1965)
- Turist Ömer Dümenciler Kralı (1965)
- Zennube (1965) - Necla
- Yankesicinin Aşkı (1965)
- Tamirci Parçası (1965)
- Komşunun Tavuğu (1965)
- Kolejli Kizin Aski (1965)
- Kocamın Nişanlısı (1965)
- Bir Garip Adam (1965)
- Berduş Milyoner (1965)
- Sokak Kızı (1966)
- Zehirli Hayat (1966)
- Turist Ömer Almanya'da (1966)
- Siyah Gül (1966)
- Namus Kanla Yazılır (1966) - Nevin
- Kıskanç Kadın (1966)
- Kenar Mahalle (1966)
- Kaderin Cilvesi (1966) - Ayse
- İdam Mahkumu (1966)
- El Kızı (1966)
- Boyacı (1966)
- Allahaısmarladık (1966)
- Yıkılan Gurur (1967)
- Sinekli Bakkal (1967) - Emine
- Marko Paşa (1967)
- Akşamcı (1967)
- Ağlayan Kadın (1967)
- Ağır Suç (1967)
- Hicran Gecesi (1968) - Sevda
- Cemile (1968)
- Turist Ömer Arabistan'da (1969)
- Sonbahar Rüzgarları (1969) - Kemal's insane wife
- Kaldırım Çiçeği (1969)
- İnleyen Nağmeler (1969)
- İki yetime (1969)
- Günahini ödeyen adam (1969)
- Galatalı Fatma (1969)
- Talihsiz Yavru Fatoş (1970)
- Sezercik yavrum benim (1971)
- Gümüs gerdanlik (1972) - Selma
- Osman Babadan ne hakem (1974) - Zarife Babadan
- Ayyas (1974)
- Aşk-ı Memnu (1974, TV Mini-Series) - Mlle. de Courton
- Seni Kalbime Gömdüm (1982)
- Kiz babasi (1986) - Esnaf
- İlk Aşk (1997, TV Series)
- Ağaçlar Ayakta Ölür (2000, TV Movie)
- The Belly Dancer (2001) - Kobra
- Tatlı Hayat (2001, TV Series) - Feraye
- Green Light (2002)
- Yanık Koza (2005) - Esmanur Çelebi (final appearance)

== See also ==
- Cinema of Turkey
