= Dünyayı Kurtaran Adam =

1982 film by Çetin İnanç

- Turkish theatrical poster
- Directed by: Çetin İnanç
- Written by: Cüneyt Arkın
- Produced by: Mehmet Karahafiz; Tim Ubels
- Starring: Cüneyt Arkın; Aytekin Akkaya; Füsun Uçar; Hüseyin Peyda; Hikmet Taşdemir; Necla Fide
- Narrated by: Muhip Arcıman
- Cinematography: Çetin Gürtop
- Edited by: Necdet Tok
- Music by: Kunt Tulgar
- Production company: Anıt Film
- Distributed by: Anıt Ticaret
- Release date: November 1, 1982 (Turkey)
- Running time: 91 minutes
- Country: Turkey
- Language: Turkish
- Budget: TL 50,000,000
- Box office: TL 25,000,000

Dünyayı Kurtaran Adam (English: The Man Who Saves The World) is a 1982 Turkish science fantasy martial arts superhero adventure film directed by Çetin İnanç, and starring actor/martial artist Cüneyt Arkın. It was first released in November 1982 by Anıt Ticaret in Turkey, and later in 2005 by BijouFlix Releasing in the United States.

The film is popularly known outside Turkey as Turkish Star Wars because it incorporates footage, music, and sound effects from Star Wars and other science fiction and adventure films without authorization. The film, part of a wave of low-budget Turksploitation superhero films produced during the 1970s to early 1980s, combines science fiction themes with martial arts fantasy action, having more in common with 1970s Hong Kong martial arts films from Golden Harvest than with Star Wars.

The film was panned by film critics and has often been described as one of the worst films ever made.

== Plot ==
Murat and Ali crash land on an alien desert planet following a battle (shown by using footage from Star Wars and newsreel clips of Soviet and American rocket launches). While hiking across the desert, they speculate that the planet is inhabited only by women. Ali uses his "irresistible" wolf-whistling to lure in the imagined women, attracting the attention of a group of skeletons on horseback, which they defeat in hand-to-hand combat.

The Sorcerer appears and captures the heroes, bringing them to a gladiatorial arena. A robot resembling Robby the Robot is also shown. He tells them he is a 1,000-year-old wizard from Earth. He had tried to defeat Earth's forces but had been repelled by a "shield of concentrated human brain molecules" (depicted with footage of the Death Star). The only way he can bypass it is to use a human brain against it.

The heroes escape and hide in a cave full of refugees who fled the Sorcerer's tyrannical rule. Murat develops a romantic connection with the only woman there (Uçar), who looks after the children. (The implied romance is shown through many long eye contacts and smiles from the girl, but nothing more.) A group of Zombies and Mummies invade the cave and infect several children, their blood used to renew the Sorcerer's immortality. The three flee the cave and find a local bar (footage of the Mos Eisley cantina lifted directly from Star Wars). The two men get into a brawl, when the Sorcerer suddenly appears and captures them again.

The Sorcerer separates the men and tries to convince them to join him. He sends his queen to seduce Ali, while he orders his robot to bring Murat before him. He offers Murat the chance to rule over the cosmos if he joins him. He possesses the power of Earth's ancestry in the form of a golden brain, and all he needs to conquer Earth is a real human brain. After Murat declines, the Sorcerer shows that he has the woman and child in captivity. Enraged, Murat fights the Sorcerer's monsters and skeleton guardians. A group of monsters attack Ali when he is about to kiss the queen. He defeats the monsters and joins Murat's fight. They are both knocked out by laser-armed guards and unsuccessfully tortured by the Sorcerer, who pits Murat against a giant monster in the arena. Murat defeats the monster and flees, taking the woman and the child with him. Ali is left in captivity.

Murat finds out about a sword made by "the 13th clan," who melted a mountain thousands of "space years" ago. Murat later finds this sword, shaped like a lightning bolt, in a cave defended by two golden ninjas. He takes the sword after dispatching the guards in an uncharacteristically short fight. Renewed by the sword's power, Murat goes to free his friend from the Sorcerer's dungeon. However, Ali becomes envious of the sword, knocks out Murat, and takes both the sword and the golden brain. The Sorcerer manipulates Ali into handing over the artifacts and uses them to trap him, Murat, the woman, and the child. Ali is killed in a foolish attempt to escape.

Grief-stricken, Murat melts down the golden sword and brain and forge them into a pair of gauntlets and boots. Equipped with magical gloves and super-jumping boots, he searches for the Sorcerer to avenge his friend's death. After fighting through numerous monsters and skeletons, he comes face-to-face with his nemesis and karate chops him in half. He then leaves the planet for Earth in a ship that resembles the Millennium Falcon.

== Cast ==
- Cüneyt Arkın as Murat
- Aytekin Akkaya as Ali
- Füsun Uçar as Wiseman's daughter
- Hüseyin Peyda as Wiseman
- Necla Fide as Queen
- Hikmet Taşdemir as Wizard
- Mehmet Uğur as Creature #1
- Kadir Kök as Creature #2
- Aydın Haberdar as Creature #3
- Yadigar Ejder as Creature #4
- Mustafa Basalan as Wiseman's son (uncredited)
- Sönmez Yıkılmaz as Robot creature (uncredited)
- Nihat Yiğit as Beating Man At The Bar (uncredited)

Directed by Çetin İnanç and written by Cüneyt Arkın, a well-known Turkish actor whose works span the last five decades, the film also starred Arkın in the leading role. Other actors include Aytekin Akkaya who later starred in the Italian film Sopravvissuti della città morta, as well as Hüseyin Peyda and Füsun Uçar both of whom remained in Turkey.

== Production ==
Director Çetin İnanç had begun his career making erotic films; after the 1980 military coup and the censorship laws that followed, he moved into action films, and his habit of completing a film in about ten days earned him the nickname "jet director". Films such as Dünyayı Kurtaran Adam were made partly because few Western blockbusters reached Turkish screens at the time. According to Utku Uluer of the Turkish cinema website Sinematik Yeşilçam, it was too expensive to bring American releases to small cinemas across rural Anatolia, and film-makers who lacked the time and money for their own effects borrowed footage and soundtracks from Hollywood films instead.

The Star Wars footage was spliced in without authorization and in a different aspect ratio from the rest of the film, and further gaps were filled with stock footage of the Soviet space programme and newsreel clips of NASA rocket launches. The new scenes were shot in the rock landscape of Cappadocia in central Anatolia. Cüneyt Arkın, one of the biggest film stars in Turkey at the time, was a qualified doctor and a trained martial artist, so the film relies on hand-to-hand combat in place of lightsaber duels.

== Soundtrack ==
The musical soundtrack is entirely lifted from popular movies. The main theme used is "The Raiders March", composed by John Williams, from the 1981 film Raiders of the Lost Ark. Other scenes incorporated the music of Moonraker, Ben-Hur, Flash Gordon, Giorgio Moroder's version of Battlestar Galactica, Planet of the Apes, Silent Running, Moses and Disney's The Black Hole. In the scene where Cüneyt Arkın and Aytekin Akkaya find the graves of old civilizations, the director selected Johann Sebastian Bach's Toccata to play. Music from Star Wars' Academy Award winning John Williams score appears, but less extensively than footage from the film.

== Reception ==
Despite initial negative reviews for its incoherent storyline, poor performances, and use of footage and music from other films, the film has since gained a significant cult following over the years and is considered to be one of the worst films ever made. Louis Proyect of Rec Arts Movie Reviews called the film "classic midnight movie fun." Phil Hall of Film Threat gave the film a perfect 5 stars, calling it "jaw-droppingly insane ... a film that makes criticism moot."

David Elroy Goldweber has criticized the "Turkish Star Wars" fan title. He notes that, while the film has science fiction themes, it is more of a martial arts fantasy film that has much more in common with 1970s Hong Kong martial arts films from Golden Harvest than it does with Star Wars. BBC News notes that Dünyayı Kurtaran Adam was part of a wave of low-budget Turkish superhero films produced during the 1970s to early 1980s.

== Sequel ==
After many attempts to gather the original actors in the film to create a sequel to The Man Who Saved the World, a follow-up, The Son of the Man Who Saved the World (Dünyayı Kurtaran Adam'ın Oğlu), commonly known as Turks in Space, was shot in 2006.

The sequel was released on 15 December 2006. Some fans expressed their disapproval that the special effects were not similar to the original film, where all the space scenes were ripped directly from science fiction titles of the time, such as Star Wars, the Star Trek series, and Battlestar Galactica. Famous actors from Turkey, such as Mehmet Ali Erbil took part, and Kartal Tibet directed.

=== Alternate sequel ===
Çetin İnanç proposed his own ideas for a much grander sequel, involving the creation of "zombie ninja space warriors," the abduction of the Turkish and American presidents by aliens, and a journey to a planet that is on the other side of a black hole. According to İnanç, it is a story that "pits God against the Devil in an epic war for Earth."

== Revivals ==
Foleyvision, an Austin, Texas-based comedy troupe who showed films replacing the original soundtrack with new dialogue, music, and sound-effects live in the theatre, used Dünyayı Kurtaran Adam as one of their performances in 2004, providing what troupe leader Buzz Moran said was "the first English translation of this film ever in the world." During the introduction to the show, Moran stated that the translator had told them that "It doesn't make any more sense in Turkish."

Filmusik, a Portland, Oregon-based collaborative performance group, similarly screened Turkish Star Wars with live voiceovers, music, and sound effects in late 2012.

== Restoration ==
In 2016, film historian Ed Glaser purchased the only known surviving 35mm print of the film from a retired projectionist. As a result, the film received a 2K scan whose quality far surpassed any previously available copy (until then, the film had only been available in versions sourced from a poor quality videotape). Glaser's restoration went on to receive a limited theatrical release in the United Kingdom in 2018. This restoration received a limited Blu-ray release from Big Bosphorus Media, being sold from 1 to 31 October 2021.

== See also ==
- Mockbuster
- List of cult films
- List of 20th century films considered the worst
