= The Belly Dancer =

2001 film by Savaş Ay

- DVD cover
- Directed by: Savaş Ay
- Written by: Savaş Ay
- Starring: Çolpan İlhan; Savaş Ay; Kerem Alışık; Nilüfer Açıkalın; İlknur Soydaş; Beyaz; Fedon; Sivga; Mustafa Altıoklar; Nuran; Panter Emel; Fikret Kuşkan; Sadri Alışık
- Release date: April 6, 2001
- Running time: 114 minutes
- Country: Turkey
- Language: Turkish

The Belly Dancer (Turkish: Dansöz) is a 2001 Turkish drama film directed and written by Savaş Ay.

== Cast ==
- Çolpan İlhan as Kobra
- Savaş Ay as Necmi
- Kerem Alışık as Zorro
- Nilüfer Açıkalın as Emira
- İlknur Soydaş as Kanarya Hayriye
- Beyaz as Taxi Driver
- Fedon as Gypsy chief 2
- Sivga as Neptün
- Mustafa Altıoklar as Gypsy chief 1
- Nuran Sultan as Zarife
- Panter Emel as Dekora
- Fikret Kuşkan as Jesus Christ
- Sadri Alışık as Tolgay
