= Leman Çıdamlı =

Turkish actress (1932–2012)

- Born: 1 January 1932; Turkey
- Died: 18 December 2012 (aged 80); Turkey
- Occupations: Television, stage and film actress
- Years active: 1974–2005
- Known for: Nuriye Kantar on Kaynanalar
- Children: 1

Leman Çıdamlı (1 January 1932 – 18 December 2012) was a Turkish television, stage and film actress mostly known for her role as "Nuriye Kantar" on the 1980s-aired Kaynanalar TV series and its remakes. She is the mother of actress Ayşegül Çıdamlı.

== Death ==
She was diagnosed with lung cancer and was treated for six months. She died on 18 December 2012, aged 80. Her spouse had died ten days before. She was interred next to her husband's grave.

== Filmography ==
- Aşk Oyunu (2005)
- Sen Ne Dilersen (2005)
- Cennet Mahallesi (2004) - Suna
- Büyükannenin Konağı (2003) - Grandmother
- Şöhretler Kebapçısı (2003)
- Bedel (2000) - Meryem
- Yasemince (1997) - Zehra
- Gülşen Abi (1994) - Naciye
- Nasreddin Hoca (1993)
- Çılgın Aşıklar (1993)
- Mahallenin Muhtarları (1992) - Seher
- Varyemez (1991) - Melek
- Zehir Hafiye (1989) - Aunt of Zeynep
- Bıçkın (1988) - Grandmother of Osman
- Kaynanalar (1988) - Nuriye Kantar
- Aşkın Gözü Kördür (1987)
- Perihan Abla (1986)
- Kahkaha Marketi (1986) - Middleman Cemile
- Bizim Kız (1977) - voice of Toto Karaca
- Bülbül Ailesi (1976) - Asiye
- Kaynanalar (1975) - Nuriye Kantar
- Nöri Gantar Ailesi (1975) - Nuriye Kantar
- Kanlı Deniz (1974) - wife of Tonyalı
- Köyden İndim Şehire (1974) - wife of Ali Rıza
- Kaynanalar (1974) - Nuriye Kantar
