= Çetin İnanç =

Turkish film director

Çetin İnanç (Born in Ankara on 12 September 1941) is a Turkish film director. His films include Dünyayı Kurtaran Adam (1982), also known as the "Turkish Star Wars".

== Life and career ==
Inanç initially pursued a career in Law, but later abandoned this. He began his cinema career as the assistant of Turkish director Atıf Yılmaz. In 1967 he made his first movie Çelik Bilek based on an Italian comics character. He quickly moved into producing erotica, but was dissuaded from that path as military took over in Turkey and passed several censorship laws against adult movies. His erotic films include Bal Badem (1978), starring Zerrin Egeliler, one of the most famous Turkish actresses of the 1970s.

Inanç's next venture was action movies, including Dünyayı Kurtaran Adam (English: "The Man Who Saved The World"), a low-budget space saga dubbed the "Turkish Star Wars".

== Filmography ==
- Killing Canilere Karşı - 1967
- Çelik Bilek - 1967
- Kral Kim - 1968
- Kızıl Maske - 1968
- Asi Kabadayı - 1969
- Asrın Kralı - 1969
- Demir Pençe - 1969
- Demir Pençe Casuslar Savaşı - 1969
- Devlerin Öcü - 1969
- Garibanlar Mahallesi - 1969
- Hedefte Vuruşanlar - 1969
- Ölüm Şart Oldu - 1970
- Altın Tabancalı Ajan - 1970
- Hoş Memo - 1970
- Püsküllü Bela - 1970
- Kanıma Kan İsterim - 1970
- Kiralık Katiller - 1970
- Kralların Kaderi Değişmez - 1970
- Çeko - 1970
- Cehennemde Şenlik Var - 1970
- Ölüm Çemberi - 1970
- Kara Memed - 1971
- Allah Benimle - 1971
- Avare Kalbim - 1971
- Zehir Hafiye - 1971
- Ölüm Bana Vız Gelir - 1971
- Şerefimle Yaşarım - 1971
- Cemo İle Cemile - 1971
- Hedefte İmzam Var - 1971
- Kinova - 1971
- Bombala Oski Bombala - 1972
- Kamçılı Kadın - 1972
- Kan Dökmez Remzi - 1972
- Kara Şeytan - 1972
- Tophaneli Murat - 1972
- Fosforlu Melek - 1972
- Görevimiz Tehlike - 1972
- Çapkın Hafiye - 1972
- Ölüm Benden Korksun
- Üç Silahşörler - 1972
- Üç Silahşörlerin İntikamı - 1972
- Affedilmeyenler - 1972
- Beddua / Günahsız Kadın - 1973
- Bilal-i Habeşi - 1973
- Dağ Kurdu - 1973
- Destan - 1973
- Kader Çıkmazı - 1973
- Kara Haydar - 1973
- Maceraya Bayılırım - 1973
- Mağrur Ve Cesur - 1973
- Sevginin Bedeli - 1973
- Yunus Emre Destanı - 1973
- Bahriyeli Kemal - 1974
- Karaların Ali - 1974
- Reşo: Vatan İçin - 1974
- Yolsuzlar - 1974
- İntikam - 1974
- Şehitler - 1974
- Ah Ne Adem Dilli Badem - 1975
- Bana Beş Avrat Yetmez - 1975
- Halime'nin Kızları - 1975
- Kral Benim - 1975
- Sefer Seferde - 1975
- Seveceksen Sev Artık - 1975
- Sıra Sende Yosma - 1975
- Çapkınım Hovardayım - 1975
- Şipşak Basarım - 1975
- Cezanı Çekeceksin - 1976
- Eden Bulur - 1976
- Gurbetçiler Dönüyor - 1976
- Günah - 1976
- Kader Bu - 1976
- Kanundan Kaçamazsın - 1976
- Kaybolan Saadet - 1976
- Kayıkçının Küreği - 1976
- Korkunç Şüphe - 1976
- Kıvrıl Fakat Kırılma - 1976
- Sokak Kadını - 1976
- Yumurtanın Sarısı - 1976
- Söyleyin Anama Ağlamasın - 1976
- Yalan - 1976
- İşler Karıştı / Zühtü - 1976
- Akdeniz Kartalı - 1976
- Aşk Dönemeci - 1976
- Enayiler Kralı - 1976
- Garip - 1977
- Gönül Ferman Dinlemez - 1977
- Son Gülen Tam Güler - 1977
- Vur Gözünün Üstüne - 1977
- Yaşamak Güzel Şey - 1977
- Çifte Nikah - 1977
- Aşkın Kanunu - 1978
- Aşkın Sıcaklığı - 1978
- Bir Daha Affetmem - 1978
- El Bebek Gül Bebek - 1978
- Ilık Dudaklar - 1978
- Kalp Kalbe Karşıdır - 1978
- Ya Şundadır Ya Bunda - 1978
- Yüz Karası - 1978
- Ne Olacak Şimdi - 1978
- Zor Oyunu Bozar - 1978
- Seven Unutmaz - 1978
- Çıldırtan Kadın / Sevmek mi Öl... - 1978
- Ölüm Yarışı - 1979
- Afferin Çocuğa - 1979
- Bal Badem - 1979
- Hayat Kadını / Sürtük - 1979
- Püsküllü Bela / Dilberim Kıyma... - 1979
- Seven Sevene - 1979
- Aşk Pınarı - 1981
- Hamaylı Boynundayım - 1981
- Kara Bahtım - 1981
- Seviyorum Allahım - 1981
- Su - 1981
- Dört Yanım Cehennem - 1982
- Bizim Mahalle - 1982
- Kelepçe - 1982
- Kimsesizler - 1982
- Gırgır Ali - 1982
- Son Savaşçı - 1982
- Dünyayı Kurtaran Adam - 1982
- Ölümsüz - 1982
- Ölüme Son Adım - 1983
- Çöl - 1983
- En Büyük Yumruk - 1983
- Erkekçe - 1983
- İdamlık - 1983
- Vahşi Kan - 1983
- İntikam Benim - 1983
- Aç Kartallar - 1984
- Ölüm Savaşçısı - 1984
- Yetim Emrah - 1984
- Dev Kanı - 1984
- Deli Fişek - 1984
- Kara Şimşek 1 - 1985
- Kaplanlar - 1985
- Bin Defa Ölürüm - 1985
- Son Darbe - 1985
- Asi Kabadayı - 1986
- Korkusuz - 1986
- Ölüm Vuruşu - 1986
- İntikamcı - 1986
- 11 Ayın Sultanı Ramazan - 1987
- Polis - 1992 (TV series)
- Kumarbaz - 1993 (TV series)
- Merhamet - 1993 (TV series)
- Şişeler - 1993 (TV series)
- Uyuşturucu - 1994 (TV series)
- Kızım Osman - 1998 (TV series)
