= Turist Ömer =

Character in Turkish comedy films

Turist Ömer or Ömer the Tourist is a recurring character in a series of comic films made in Turkey between 1964 and 1973. The character was played by Sadri Alışık.

Turist Ömer first appeared as a supporting character in a 1963 film by Hulki Saner, Helal Olsun Ali Abi. He was a friend of the protagonist in that film. The character was liked so much by the people that a whole series of feature films was produced with him as the lead character.

== Movies ==
- Turist Ömer (Ömer the Tourist, 1964)
- Ayşecik - Cimcime Hanım (Ayşecik: Naughty Lady, 1964)
- Turist Ömer dümenciler kralı (1965)
- Turist Ömer Almanya'da (Ömer the Tourist in Germany, 1966)
- Turist Ömer Arabistan'da (1969)
- Turist Ömer Yamyamlar Arasında (1970)
- Turist Ömer Boğa Güreşçisi (1971)
- Turist Ömer Uzay Yolunda (Ömer the Tourist in Star Trek, 1973), comedic reworking of The Man Trap, this film is colloquially known as the Turkish Star Trek
