= Savaş Ay =

Turkish newspaper and television journalist (1954–2013)

- Born: 26 March 1954; Gaziantep, Turkey
- Died: 9 November 2013 (aged 59); Istanbul, Turkey
- Education: Marmara Academy of Commerce
- Occupations: Newspaper and television journalist, director, producer, actor, screenwriter, photographer
- Years active: 1974–2013

Savaş Ay (26 March 1954 – 9 November 2013) was a Turkish newspaper and television journalist, director, screenwriter, producer, photographer, and actor best known for his panel discussion television series A Takımı (The A-Team).

== Biography ==
Savaş Ay was born on March 26, 1954 in Gaziantep, the son of actor Turan Ay and his actress wife Şükran. After graduating from Marmara Academy of Commerce, he began a journalism career in 1974 at the business and economics daily Dünya. He later was with the newspapers Tercüman, Vatan, Milliyet, Sabah and the news agency Akajans. Ay's very popular panel discussion television series A Takımı, which debuted in 1993, aired on channels like ATV, TGRT, Kanal D, Kanal 6, Show TV, Flash TV, Star TV and Kanal 1.

Savaş Ay interviewed as one of the last two journalists and took the last photo of the 17-year-old Erdal Eren in the prison before his execution. Eren was arrested after the 1980 Turkish coup d'état due to an alleged murder, tortured in the prison, and hanged despite being underage.

In the 1996 movie İstanbul Kanatlarımın Altında ("Istanbul Beneath My Wings"), he depicted a wine drinker in a supporting role. In 2001, he directed the movie Dansöz ("The Belly Dancer"), he wrote the screenplay of and played also in, which gained no success. In the 2007 comedy movie Maskeli Beşler: Irak ("The Masked Gang: Iraq"), he played himself in the television studio of "The A-Team".

Savaş Ay suffered from throat cancer for years. Due to disorder of his voice, he was not able to continue his television shows in his final years. He died on 9 November 2013 in a hospital at Samatya, Istanbul, where he had been treated since 24 September 2013. He was survived by his singer son Ulaş Can Ay and daughter Sanem Dolun Ay.
