= Hulki Saner =

Turkish film director, screenwriter and producer

- Born: 14 February 1923; Istanbul, Ottoman Empire
- Died: 20 July 2005 (aged 82); Istanbul, Turkey
- Occupation: Producer
- Years active: 1957–1987

Hulki Saner (14 February 1923 – 20 July 2005) was a Turkish film director, screenwriter and producer. He contributed to more than one hundred films from 1957 to 1987 and is known for directing the Turist Ömer film series.
