= Rampage (1986 film) =

- 2009 promotional poster for the US DVD release by Dark Maze Studios.
- Directed by: Çetin Inanç
- Written by: Cagdas Agirdas; Çetin Inanç (scenario)
- Produced by: Mehmet Karahafız; Ed Glaser (English version)
- Starring: Serdar Kebapçılar; Filiz Taçbaş; Hüseyin Peyda
- Cinematography: Dinçer Önal
- Edited by: Necdet Tok
- Music by: Jake Kaufman (English version)
- Distributed by: Anıt Ticaret
- Release date: 6 July 1986 (Turkey)
- Running time: 74 minutes
- Country: Turkey
- Language: Turkish

Rampage (Turkish: Korkusuz, lit. 'Fearless') is a 1986 Turkish cult action film, written and directed by Çetin Inanç, featuring bodybuilder Serdar Kebapçılar as a Turkish commando who must infiltrate and capture a group of terrorists living in the mountains. The film is the second of two films, along with Wild Blood (Turkish: Vahşi Kan; 1983) also written and directed by Çetin İnanç, commonly known as Turkish Rambo because of plot and stylistic similarities copied from George P. Cosmatos’s Rambo: First Blood Part II (1985). It is also available in an English dubbed U.S. theatrical release produced by Ed Glaser.

== Plot ==
Serdar, a highly trained Turkish commando, is dispatched on a covert mission to infiltrate a terrorist organization operating out of a remote mountain stronghold. The group has stolen a sensitive military disk containing top-secret intelligence, posing a significant threat to national security. During the operation, Serdar’s unit is ambushed and killed, leaving him to be captured and subjected to brutal torture by the insurgents. Upon escaping, he launches a retaliatory one-man assault against the camp. Armed with a rocket launcher and explosive-tipped arrows, Serdar dismantles the terrorist infrastructure and eliminates the enemy forces to successfully retrieve the stolen disk.

== Cast ==
=== Original Turkish cast ===
- Serdar Kebapçılar as Serdar
- Osman Betin as Osman
- Yılmaz Kurt as Terrorist #3
- Tuğrul Meteer as Captain Ömer
- Hüseyin Peyda as Ziya
- Filiz Taçbaş as Girl
- Sümer Tilmaç as Sait / Major Fuat
- Mehmet Uğur as Terrorist #2
- Sami Hazinses as Kid's Father
- Mehmet Samsa as Terrorist #1

=== English dub voice cast ===
- Andy Dallas as Sait
- Peter A. Davis as Ziya & Terrorist #3
- Steve Glaser as Sergeant & Kid's Father
- Eric W. Sizemore as Serdar, Osman & Captain Omer
- Jennifer Zahn as Girl
- Meagan Benz as Meagan Rachelle
- Alex Mitchell
- Al Morrison

== DVD release ==
The film was released on DVD on April 24, 2009, by Dark Maze Studios; But it was discontinued on June 12, 2013.
