= Hezârfen Ahmed Çelebi =

Purported Ottoman aviator

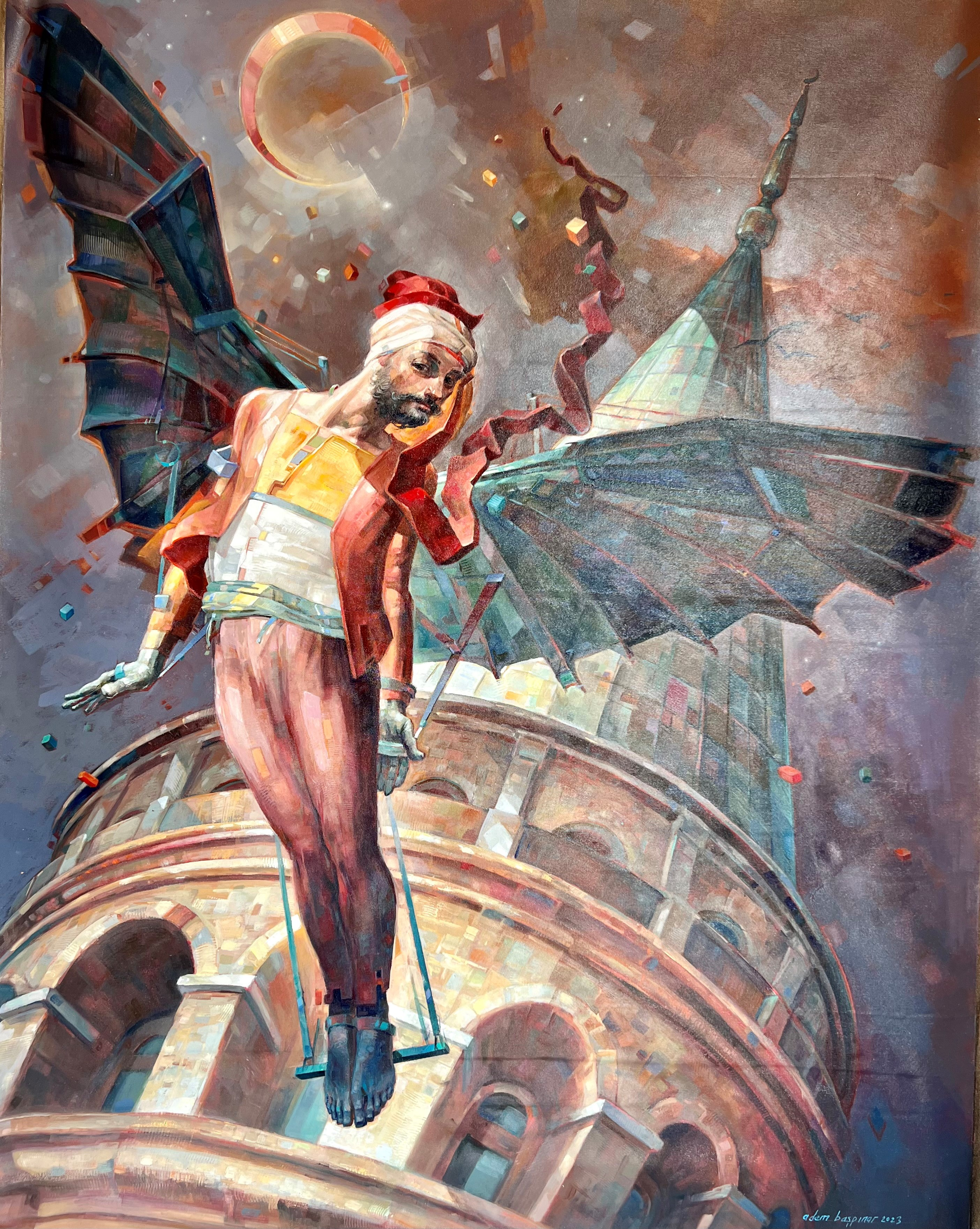
- Modern image depicting the first intercontinental flight by Ahmed Çelebi
- Born: Ahmed; 1609; Constantinople, Ottoman Empire
- Died: 1640 (aged 30–31); Ottoman Algeria
- Occupation: Scientist
- Known for: first sustained unpowered flight
- Relatives: Lagâri Hasan Çelebi (brother)

Hezârfen Ahmed Çelebi (Ottoman Turkish: هزارفنّ أحمد چلبی,, lit. 'Polymath Ahmed the wise'; 1609 – 1640) was an Ottoman scientist, inventor, chemist, astronomer, physician, Andalusi musician, and poet from Constantinople, reported in the writings of traveler Evliya Çelebi to have achieved sustained unpowered flight. Evliya's account is the only known source for his life.

== Etymology of name ==
The title "Hezârfen", given by Evliyâ Çelebi to Ahmed Çelebi, is from Persian هزار hezār meaning -a thousand- + فنّ fann meaning -science together making it together Ahmed having talents in "a thousand of sciences (polymath).

== Non-powered flight ==
Flight path, as described by Evliya Çelebi

The 17th century writings of Evliyâ Çelebi relate this story of Hezârfen Ahmed Çelebi, during the reign of Murad IV (1623–1640):

First, he practiced by flying over the pulpit of Okmeydanı eight or nine times with eagle wings, using the force of the wind. Then, as Sultan Murad Khan (Murad IV) was watching from the Sinan Pasha mansion at Sarayburnu, he flew from the very top of the Galata Tower (in contemporary Karaköy) and landed in the Doğancılar Square in Üsküdar, with the help of the south-west wind. Murad Khan then rewarded him for his feat with a sack of gold coins, saying: "This man is uncanny: he is capable of doing anything he wishes. It is not right to surround oneself with such people". True to his word, he then exiled Ahmed to Algeria, where the scientist remained until his death.

— Evliyâ Çelebi

== Legacy ==
- One of 4 airports in Istanbul is named the "Hezarfen Airfield".
- A 1996 feature-length film, "Istanbul Beneath My Wings" (İstanbul Kanatlarımın Altında) concerns the lives of Hezârfen Ahmet Çelebi, his brother and purported rocket aviator Lagari Hasan Çelebi (per the same single source, Çelebi, as the above story), and Ottoman society in the early 17th century, as witnessed and narrated by Evliya Çelebi.
- The Turkish children’s TV show “Little Hezarfen” (Küçük Hezarfen) is about Hezârfen Ahmet Çelebi's childhood, though the events that occur within the show are likely fictitious and/or exaggerated. A main theme within the show, however, is Hezarfen's desire to build wings that allow him to fly.
- Also featured in Turkish series "Magnificent Century: Kosem" in episode 41.

== See also ==
- Lagâri Hasan Çelebi
- Abbas ibn Firnas
