= Sadri Alışık =

Turkish actor (1925–1995)

- Born: Mehmet Sadrettin Alışık; 5 April 1925; Istanbul, Turkey
- Died: 18 March 1995 (aged 69); Istanbul, Turkey
- Resting place: Zincirlikuyu Cemetery; 41°4′30″N 29°0′30″E
- Occupations: Actor; director; comedian; writer
- Years active: 1942–1995
- Spouse: Çolpan İlhan (m. 1959)
- Children: Kerem Alışık

Sadri Alışık (born Mehmet Sadrettin Alışık; 5 April 1925 – 18 March 1995) was a Turkish stage and movie actor, and one of the most loved comedians in Turkey. He was the husband of Çolpan İlhan.

== Biography ==
He was a prolific actor, appearing in popular cinema and television. His movies often depicted poor, uneducated people of society, who were nevertheless happy and yet still believed in love. His most notable works were filmed during the 1960s and 1970s. His series of comedic movies titled "Turist Ömer" were also popular. He also had a leading role in the widely viewed Turkish television series, "Kartallar Yüksek Uçar".

Sadri Alışık and his cinema partner Ayhan Işık studied at picture department of Fine Art State Academy. He was also very interested in poetry and published his poems in a book called "Bir Ömürlük İstanbul" or Istanbul of a Lifetime.

He died on 18 March 1995. He was laid to rest at the Zincirlikuyu Cemetery in Istanbul.

== Legacy ==
A cultural center was established in Istanbul by his wife, Çolpan İlhan, after his death, under the name Sadri Alışık Kültür Merkezi (Sadri Alışık Culture Center). The same Cultural Center organizes Sadri Alışık Cinema and Theatre Awards every year. Several academic theses on Sadri Alışık's career have been published in Turkish. 2 master's degree theses on Sadri Alışık have been published in 2008. 3 other master's degree theses exists on the movie character Alışık played and usually associated with, Turist Ömer (Ömer the Tourist) as well as an academic article by Tamer Bayrak.

On April 5, 2021, Google celebrated his 96th birthday with a Google Doodle.
